= Robert Dudley Oliver =

Royal Navy Admiral (1766–1850)

Admiral Robert Dudley Oliver
- Born: 31 October 1766
- Died: 1 September 1850 (aged 83); Dalkey, Ireland
- Military career
- Allegiance: United Kingdom
- Branch: Royal Navy
- Service years: 1779–1814
- Rank: Admiral
- Conflicts: American Revolutionary War; Battle of St. Kitts; Battle of the Saintes; French Revolutionary Wars; Capture of Revolutionnaire; Napoleonic Wars; Capture of Rhin; War of 1812

Admiral Robert Dudley Oliver (31 October 1766 – 1 September 1850) was a senior officer of the British Royal Navy during the early nineteenth century, who served in the American Revolutionary War, the French Revolutionary Wars and the Napoleonic Wars with distinction, seeing action several times during his career, particularly with the fleet in the Caribbean during 1782. After briefly serving in the War of 1812 off the coast of Virginia, Oliver retired from the Navy, settling near Dublin, where he was an active member of religious societies until his death in 1850.

== Life ==
Oliver was born in 1766 and entered the Navy aged 13, joining HMS Prince George in 1779 as a shipmate of the young Prince William. Prince George was the flagship of Rear-Admiral Robert Digby, and in 1781 was sent to the coast of North America during the American Revolutionary War. Oliver remained in the Americas aboard Prince George until the end of the war seeing action at the Battle of St. Kitts and the large Battle of the Saintes in 1782, at which Prince George was heavily engaged.

Oliver was not employed in the interwar years, but in 1790 he was promoted to lieutenant during the Spanish Armament and remained in service in the frigate HMS Active in the North Sea. In 1794 he moved to the frigate HMS Artois under Captain Edmund Nagle that formed part of the squadron under Commodore Sir John Borlase Warren. Artois was heavily engaged at the action of 21 October 1794, when the French frigate Révolutionnaire was captured. In recognition of his service in the battle, Oliver was promoted to commander, serving first on the sloop HMS Hazard off Ireland and then in the guardship HMS Nonsuch in the Humber in 1796.

In February 1798, Oliver was promoted to post captain and took command of the small frigate HMS Nemesis, escorting a convoy to Quebec. The following year he took command of the larger frigate HMS Mermaid operating in the Mediterranean and in 1802 he convoyed General Lord Hutchinson back to Britain. During the Peace of Amiens he was unemployed, but he returned to sea in 1803 as captain of the frigate HMS Melpomene, operating off the French coast until 1805, when he was sent to the Spanish coast to join the fleet under Vice-Admiral Lord Nelson at Cádiz. Melpomene was not engaged at the Battle of Trafalgar, but assisted in the aftermath of the battle by towing damaged prizes away from the battle site.

In recognition of his assistance at Trafalgar, Oliver was given command of the ship of the line HMS Mars, whose captain, George Duff had been killed in the battle. Mars joined the blockade of the French Atlantic coast, and in July 1806 successfully chased down and captured the French frigate Rhin following Lamellerie's expedition. In September 1806, Oliver was placed in reserve, returning to service in May 1810 aboard HMS Valiant, ordered to operate off the coast of the United States. Following the outbreak of the War of 1812, Valiant was detached to Virginia, operating along the coastline against local shipping. In 1814, Oliver resigned his command and returned to Britain.

He never served at sea again, although he continued to be promoted in rank on the Navy list, becoming a full admiral in 1841. He lived with his wife Mary, daughter of Sir Charles Saxton whom he married in 1805, and their five sons and one daughter in the town of Dalkey, near Dublin in Ireland. Oliver spent his time in retirement as an active member of various religious societies in Dublin, including the local Bible Society. He died at his home in September 1850, 36 years after his retirement from the Navy.

His youngest son was Lieutenant-Colonel James Hewitt Oliver (d.1902, aged 79).
