= Harnage (disambiguation) =

Harnage is a village in England.

Harnage may also refer to:

- Harnage baronets
- Sir George Harnage, 1st Baronet (1767–1836), British businessman
- Phil Harnage, American screenwriter
- Blake Harnage (born 1988), American songwriter and composer
