= Action of 21 October 1794 =

Minor naval engagement during the French Revolutionary Wars

- Part of the French Revolutionary Wars
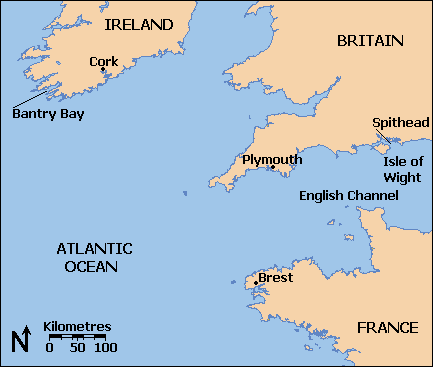
- Map of the region, the approximate location of the action marked in red
Date	21 October 1794
Location	Off Ushant, Atlantic Ocean
Result	British victory

Belligerents
Great Britain	France

Commanders and leaders
Edward Pellew	Antoine Thévenard

Strength
4 frigates	1 frigate

Casualties and losses
3 killed 5 wounded	8 killed 5 wounded 1 frigate captured

The action of 21 October 1794 was a minor naval engagement between Great Britain and France fought off the Breton coast of France during the second year of the French Revolutionary Wars. French frigates had been raiding British Atlantic trade routes with considerable success since the outbreak of the war, and in response the Admiralty had formed a frigate squadron to patrol the French Channel and Atlantic coasts in search of French raiders. On 13 October 1794, the large, modern and powerful 40-gun French frigate Révolutionnaire under the command of Captain Antoine René Thévenard sailed from Le Havre for a raiding cruise against British trade routes in the Atlantic. Eight days later, while rounding the Breton headland of Ushant about 25–30 nautical miles (56 km) out to sea, Révolutionnaire encountered the British frigate squadron, commanded by Commodore Sir Edward Pellew, which had secured a number of victories over French raiding frigates during the previous two years.

Pellew ordered his ships to give chase, as Thévenard fled towards the French coast before the British numerical supremacy. One British ship was faster than the others, the 38-gun HMS Artois under Captain Edmund Nagle cutting Révolutionnaire off from the shore and bringing the larger French ship to action. For 45 minutes Artois battled Révolutionnaire until support arrived, at which point the French frigate's crew surrendered their ship in defiance of their captain's orders. Casualties and damage were light on both sides, and Révolutionnaire was rapidly commissioned into the Royal Navy, joining the squadron that had captured her and subsequently capturing the French frigate Unité at the action of 13 April 1796.

== Background ==
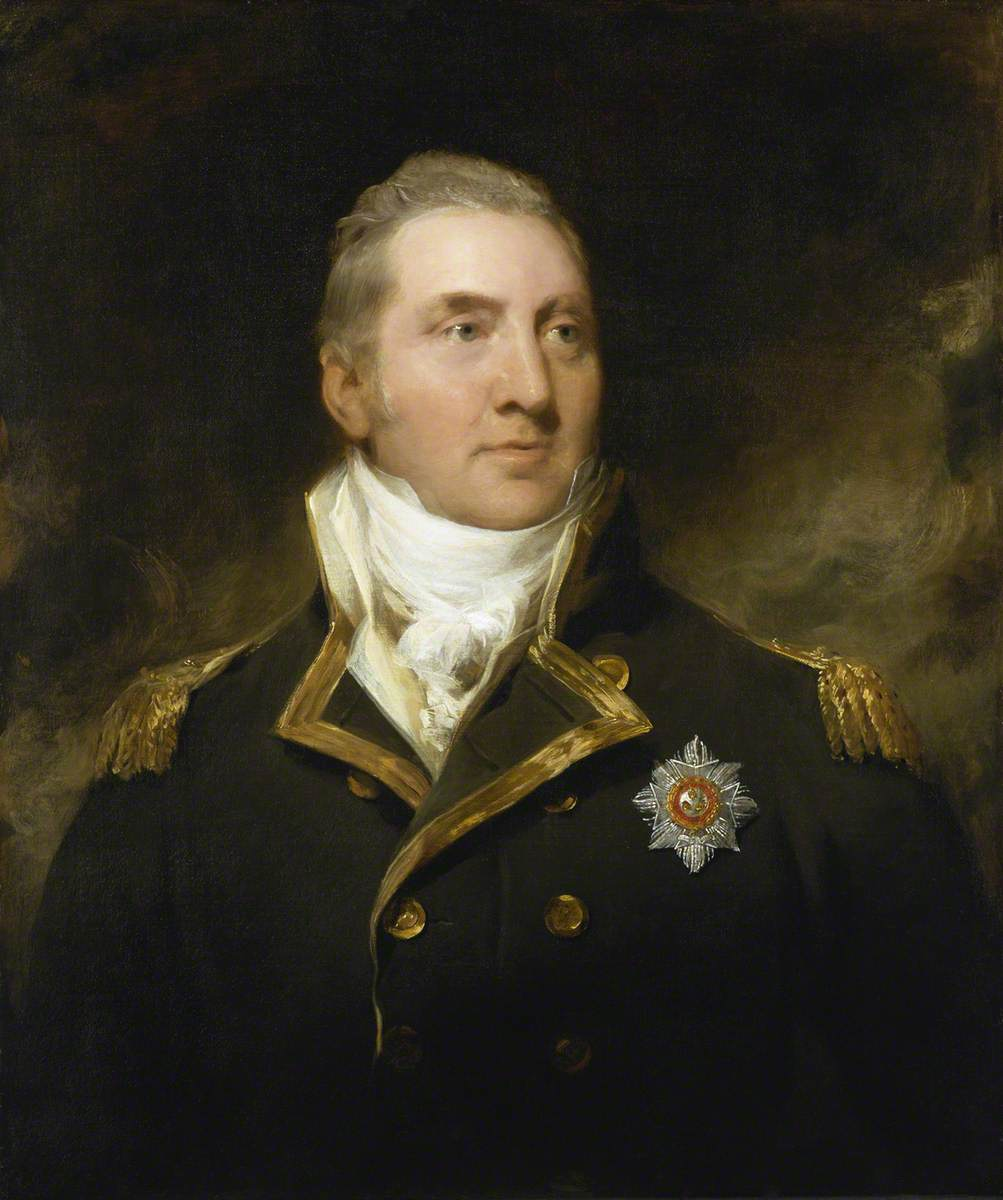
Portrait of Sir Edward Pellew by Thomas Lawrence, c.1797

Following the French Republic's declaration of war on Great Britain in February 1793, the French Navy immediately launched squadrons, individual cruisers and privateers against British trade routes in the Eastern Atlantic. The French Atlantic fleet, based at the fortified port of Brest in Brittany, was in a state of political turmoil during the early years of the war, suffering a mutiny in August 1793, and then defeat at the battle of Glorious First of June in 1794. In spite of these difficulties, the independent raiders caused considerable damage to British commerce, and in response the Admiralty ordered a squadron of frigates from the Channel Fleet to cruise the French coastline in search of these raiders. This force, known as the flying squadron and initially commanded by Sir John Borlase Warren, achieved a number of successes in the first year of the war, most notably in the action of 23 April 1794, when a French frigate squadron was destroyed.

By the autumn of 1794, the squadron was under the command of Commodore Sir Edward Pellew in the frigate HMS Arethusa, accompanied by HMS Artois under Captain Edmund Nagle, HMS Diamond under Captain Sir Sidney Smith and HMS Galatea under Captain Richard Goodwin Keats. All four ships had specially selected crews and equipment and the squadron formed the elite force of the Channel Fleet's light warships. Pellew led his squadron out of Cawsand Bay on 19 October with the intention of cruising off the entrance to Brest and intercepting shipping entering or leaving the port. The French fleet, its principal squadrons blockaded in Brest, continued to send raiders to sea. One such ship, was the large newly commissioned 40-gun frigate Révolutionnaire under Captain Antoine René Thévenard with a hastily assembled and disaffected crew and a main battery of 18–pounder cannon, which departed from the Channel port of Le Havre on 13 October, sailing westwards towards the Atlantic.

== Battle ==
On 21 October, eight days after leaving Le Havre, and between 25–30 nautical miles (56 km) off the island of Ushant at the tip of the Breton Peninsula, Révolutionnaire was discovered at dawn by Pellew's squadron. Pellew immediately ordered his ships to give chase while Thévenard turned away in an effort to reach the shoreline before the larger British squadron could overwhelm his ship. Pellew's squadron was however to windward of the French ship, thus cutting it off from the relative safety of the shore and instead Révolutionnaire swung southeast in an effort to outdistance the British squadron and pull ahead of Pellew's ships in the hazy weather.

One British frigate, Nagle's Artois, was however faster than the others. Artois was a strong modern frigate with a main battery of 9–pounder cannon and 32–pounder carronades on the quarterdeck, and Nagle was able to bring his frigate alongside the slightly larger French vessel. For forty minutes the two frigates traded broadsides, Nagle's fire damaging the French ship's rigging and slowing Révolutionnaire enough that the rest of Pellew's squadron could come up. Captain Smith's Diamond was the first to reach the combat, Smith ranging his ship up below Thévenard's stern and firing two warning shots to indicate that unless the French ship surrendered he would fire a devastating raking broadside into the French ship's stern. Arethusa and Galatea were close behind Diamond, and although Thévenard wished to continue the engagement, his men refused and the French captain was forced to surrender. At the point Révolutionnaire surrendered, breakers from the waves striking the Saints Rocks could be seen dead ahead.

=== Combatant summary ===
In this table, "Guns" refers to all cannon carried by the ship, including the maindeck guns which were taken into consideration when calculating its rate, as well as any carronades carried aboard. Broadside weight records the combined weight of shot which could be fired in a single simultaneous discharge of an entire broadside.

Ship	Commander	Navy	Guns	Tons	Broadside weight	Complement	Casualties		
Ship	Commander	Navy	Guns	Tons	Broadside weight	Complement	Killed	Wounded	Total
HMS Artois	Captain Edmund Nagle		44	996bm	370 pounds (170 kg)	281	3	5	8
Révolutionnaire	Captain Antoine René Thévenard	France official	44	1148bm	403 pounds (183 kg)	351	8	5	13
Source: Clowes, p. 487

== Aftermath ==
Casualties were light on both sides; Révolutionnaire lost five men killed and four wounded, including Thévenard who had suffered minor wounds, while Artois was the only British ship engaged, losing two sailors and a lieutenant of Royal Marines killed and five men wounded. Pellew's squadron brought Révolutionnaire back to Falmouth immediately, having discovered an outbreak of small pox among the prisoners of war taken from the French frigate. Subsequently, the light damage the ship had suffered enabled the Royal Navy to rapidly purchase and commission the frigate as the 38-gun HMS Révolutionnaire under the command of Captain Francis Cole and attach the ship to Pellew's squadron. Eighteen months later, Révolutionnaire fought and captured the French frigate Unité at the action of 12 April 1796, and remained in the Royal Navy throughout the following 21 years of warfare. The arrival of Révolutionnaire in Britain caused a stir among naval architects as the frigate was significantly larger than those produced in Britain at the time. The ship was extensively planned and modelled and a ship was commissioned for the Royal Navy to the design of Révolutionnaire, although severe delays at the shipyards meant that HMS Forte, as the ship was eventually named, was not launched until 1814.

In reward for his action against Révolutionnaire, Nagle was made a Knight Bachelor, and First Lieutenant Robert Dudley Oliver was promoted to commander. Pellew, in his report on the action, stated that "the cripped state of the Enemy allows me the Opportunity of saying, that her Resiliance could have been of no Avail, had the Artois been alone", but historian William James was more reserved, noting in 1827 that the ships "would have been a well matched pair of combatants, had the Artois been alone." The prize money was extensive: part payment of £10,000 (£1,150,216 as of 2025) was made in January 1795, the reward shared between the entire squadron. Pellew, who had been knighted the previous year following the action of 18 June 1793, was reported to be unhappy that Nagle had been honoured for his part in this action and complained to the Admiralty about the condition and speed of Arethusa, requesting a faster vessel. The following year he would receive command of the 44-gun razee HMS Indefatigable as a result.

== Bibliography ==
- Brenton, Edward Pelham (1837) [1825]. The Naval History of Great Britain, Vol. I. London: C. Rice. "edward pelham brenton."
- Clowes, William Laird (1997) [1900]. The Royal Navy, A History from the Earliest Times to 1900, Volume IV. London: Chatham Publishing. ISBN 1-86176-013-2.
- Henderson CBE, James (1994) [1970]. The Frigates. Leo Cooper. ISBN 0-85052-432-6.
- James, William (2002) [1827]. The Naval History of Great Britain, Volume 1, 1793–1796. London: Conway Maritime Press. ISBN 0-85177-905-0.
- Woodman, Richard (2001). The Sea Warriors. Constable Publishers. ISBN 1-84119-183-3.
