= Campaign Castle, Barbados =

Town in Barbados

Campaign Castle is a town located in the province of Saint George, Barbados. Campaign Castle is located 11km east of Bridgetown. It is surrounded by Boarded Hall, Watts Village, Dash Valley and Monroe Village.
