= Church View, Saint George, Barbados =

Village in Barbados

Coordinates: 13°11′N 59°30′W

Church View is a village located in the province of Saint George, Barbados. Church View is located about 15km from Bridgetown. It is surrounded by Boarded Hall, Pothouse and Gall Hill.
