= Edmund Nagle =

Irish Royal Navy Admiral (1757–1830)

Admiral Sir Edmund Nagle KCB
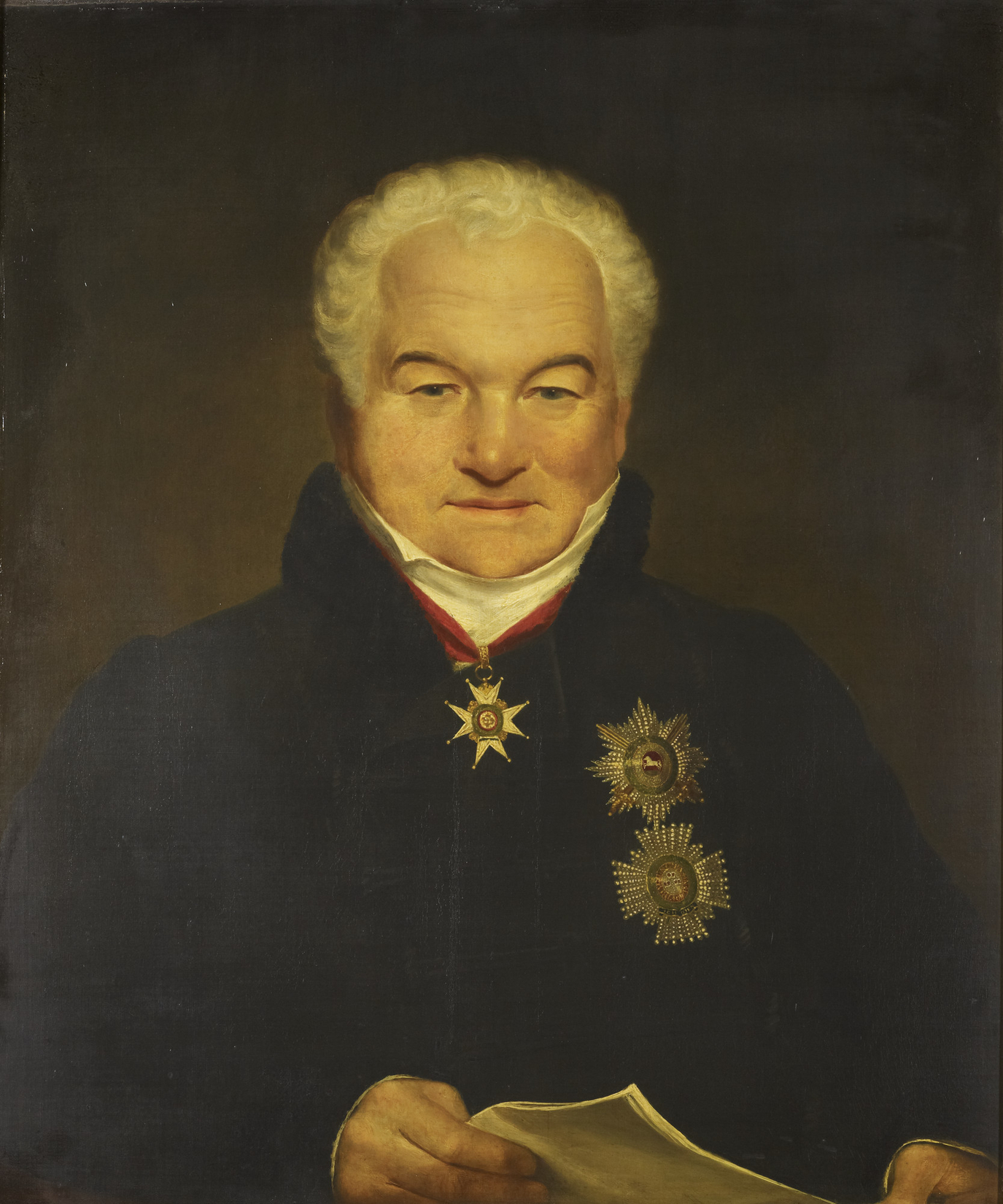
- Sir Edward Nagle by William Corden the Elder
- Born: 1757; Bloomfield, County Cork
- Died: 14 March 1830 (aged 72–73); East Molesey, Surrey
- Military career
- Allegiance: United Kingdom
- Branch: Royal Navy
- Service years: 1770–1830
- Rank: Admiral
- Commands: Leith Station; Guernsey Station
- Conflicts: American Revolutionary War; French Revolutionary Wars; Action of 21 October 1794; Napoleonic Wars
- Awards: Knight Commander of the Order of the Bath

Admiral Sir Edmund Nagle, KCB (1757 – 14 March 1830) was an Irish officer in the Royal Navy during the late eighteenth and nineteenth centuries who is best known for his capture of the French frigate Révolutionnaire at the action of 21 October 1794 and his close association with George IV as a courtier from 1820 to his own death. He served as Commander-in-Chief at Leith, and on the Coast of Scotland and Commander-in-Chief on the Guernsey Station.

== Life ==
Edmund Nagle was born in 1757 at Bloomfield, County Cork in the Kingdom of Ireland. His father, Edmund Nagle Sr. died when his son was only six and Nagle was raised by relatives including the politician and philosopher Edmund Burke. In 1770, Nagle entered the Royal Navy in the frigate Juno and was present at the British occupation of the Falkland Islands the following year. He served in the American Revolutionary War without seeing extensive action, on Greenwich, Syren, Polecat, and Warwick until he was captured in 1782 when commanding the small brig Racoon. He was recaptured in September by Warwick, and at the end of the war entered the reserve after briefly commanding Hound and Grana.

Nagle returned to active service in 1793 at the outbreak of the French Revolutionary Wars and commanded first Active and then Artois with a detached squadron of frigates from the Channel Fleet commanded by Commodore Sir Edward Pellew. It was with this force that Artois was cruising off the French Channel coast when the French frigate Révolutionnaire was discovered. The squadron gave chase, Nagle catching the larger French ship and fighting her until support arrived. Révolutionnaire surrendered, and in 1794 Nagle was made a Knight Bachelor for his service in capturing her. He remained in command of Artois until 1797, when the frigate was wrecked on the French coast in pursuit of an enemy ship.

In 1798, Nagle married a wealthy widow, Mary Blackman (née Harnage) formerly the wife of John Lucie Blackman, father of Sir George Harnage, 1st Baronet of the Harnage baronets, and effectively retired from the sea. He had minor commands on board Majestic and Juste and in 1803 took command of the Sea Fencibles, a coastal fencible force, based at Shoreham-by-Sea. There he met Prince George, the naval officer striking up a close friendship with the playboy prince. Nagle, who was described by Burke as having "a spirited and pleasing simplicity in his manner", was often the butt of the prince's jokes, but the relationship bore dividends as Nagle was promoted rapidly, becoming a rear-admiral in 1805 and a vice-admiral in 1810 with spells of service at Guernsey and Leith. In 1813, after a very brief tenure as absentee Governor of Newfoundland, Nagle was made an official aide-de-camp to the Prince. He became a Knight Commander of the Order of the Bath in 1815 and a full admiral in 1819.

In 1820, when Prince George became King George IV, Nagle was appointed Groom of the Bedchamber, and moved into the King's Royal residences, although also maintaining an estate at East Molesey in Surrey. He remained close to the King until his death at his private estate, just three months before the King also died. After the passage of the Slave Compensation Act 1837, Nagle was listed as a mortgagee of his stepson George Blackman's slave plantation Boarded Hall, and so was issued compensation despite being deceased.
