= William the Elder =

William the Elder may refer to:

- William Corden the Elder (1795–1867), English portrait painter and miniaturist
- William Goode, the elder (1762–1816), English evangelical Anglican clergyman
- William Holl the Elder (1771–1838), English engraver
- William Macready the elder (1755–1829), Irish actor-manager
- William Morgan (of Tredegar, elder) (1700–1731), Welsh Whig politician
- William Pitt the Elder (1708–1778), British statesman
- William Theed the elder (1764–1817), English sculptor and painter
