= Artois-class frigate =

- Design of the class

Class overview
- Name: Artois class
- Operators: Royal Navy; Royal Netherlands Navy
- Preceded by: Pallas class
- Succeeded by: Alcmene class
- Completed: 9
- Lost: 5

General characteristics
- Type: Frigate
- Tons burthen: 983 70/94 bm (as designed)
- Length: 146 ft 0 in (44.5 m) (gundeck); 121 ft 7.125 in (37.1 m) (keel)
- Beam: 39 ft 0 in (11.9 m)
- Depth of hold: 13 ft 9 in (4.19 m)
- Sail plan: Full-rigged ship
- Complement: 270 (altered later to 315)
- Armament: Upper deck: 28 × 18-pounder guns; Quarterdeck: 2 × 9-pounder guns; 12 × 32-pounder carronades; Forecastle: 2 × 9-pounder guns; 2 × 32-pounder carronades

The Artois class were a series of nine frigates built to a 1793 design by Sir John Henslow, which served in the Royal Navy during the French Revolutionary and Napoleonic Wars.

Seven of these ships were built by contract with commercial builders, while the remaining pair (Tamar and Clyde) were dockyard-built – the latter built using "fir" (pitch pine) instead of the normal oak.

They were armed with a main battery of 28 eighteen-pounder cannon on their upper deck, the main gun deck of a frigate. Besides this battery, they also carried two 9-pounders together with twelve 32-pounder carronades on the quarterdeck, and another two 9-pounders together with two 32-pounder carronades on the forecastle.

== Ships in class ==
Ship name	Builder	Ordered	Laid down	Launched	Commissioned	Fate	Ref.
HMS Artois	John & William Wells, Rotherhithe	28 March 1793	March 1793	3 January 1794	December 1793	Wrecked on the Ballieu rocks off Brittany on 31 July 1797	
HMS Diana	Randall & Co, Rotherhithe	28 March 1793	March 1793	3 March 1794	April 1794	Sold to new Dutch Navy on 7 March 1815; burnt in fire at Willemsoord, Den Helder on 16 January 1839	
HMS Apollo	Perry & Hankey, Blackwall	28 March 1793	March 1793	18 March 1794	August 1794	Wrecked on the Haak sands off the Dutch coast on 7 January 1799	
HMS Diamond	William Barnard, Deptford	28 March 1793	April 1793	17 March 1794	April 1794	Broken up at Sheerness Dockyard in June 1812	
HMS Seahorse	Marmaduke Stalkart, Rotherhithe	14 February 1793	March 1793	11 June 1794	July 1794	Broken up at Plymouth Dockyard in July 1819	
HMS Jason	John Dudman, Deptford	1 April 1793	April 1793	3 April 1794	May 1794	Wrecked on rocks off Brittany on 13 October 1798	
HMS Tamar	Chatham Royal Dockyard	4 February 1795	June 1795	26 March 1796	April 1796	Broken up in January 1810 at Chatham Dockyard.	
HMS Clyde	Chatham Royal Dockyard	4 February 1795	June 1795	26 March 1796	April 1796	Sold to be broken up August 1814.	
HMS Ethalion	Joseph Graham, Harwich	30 April 1795	October 1795	14 March 1797	April 1797	Wrecked on the Penmarcks on 25 December 1799	
