= Bulkeley, Saint George, Barbados =

Town in Barbados

Coordinates: 13.123°N 59.548°W

Bulkeley is a town located in the province of Saint George, Barbados.
