= Gun Hill Signal Station =

Coordinates: 13.1432°N 59.5574°W

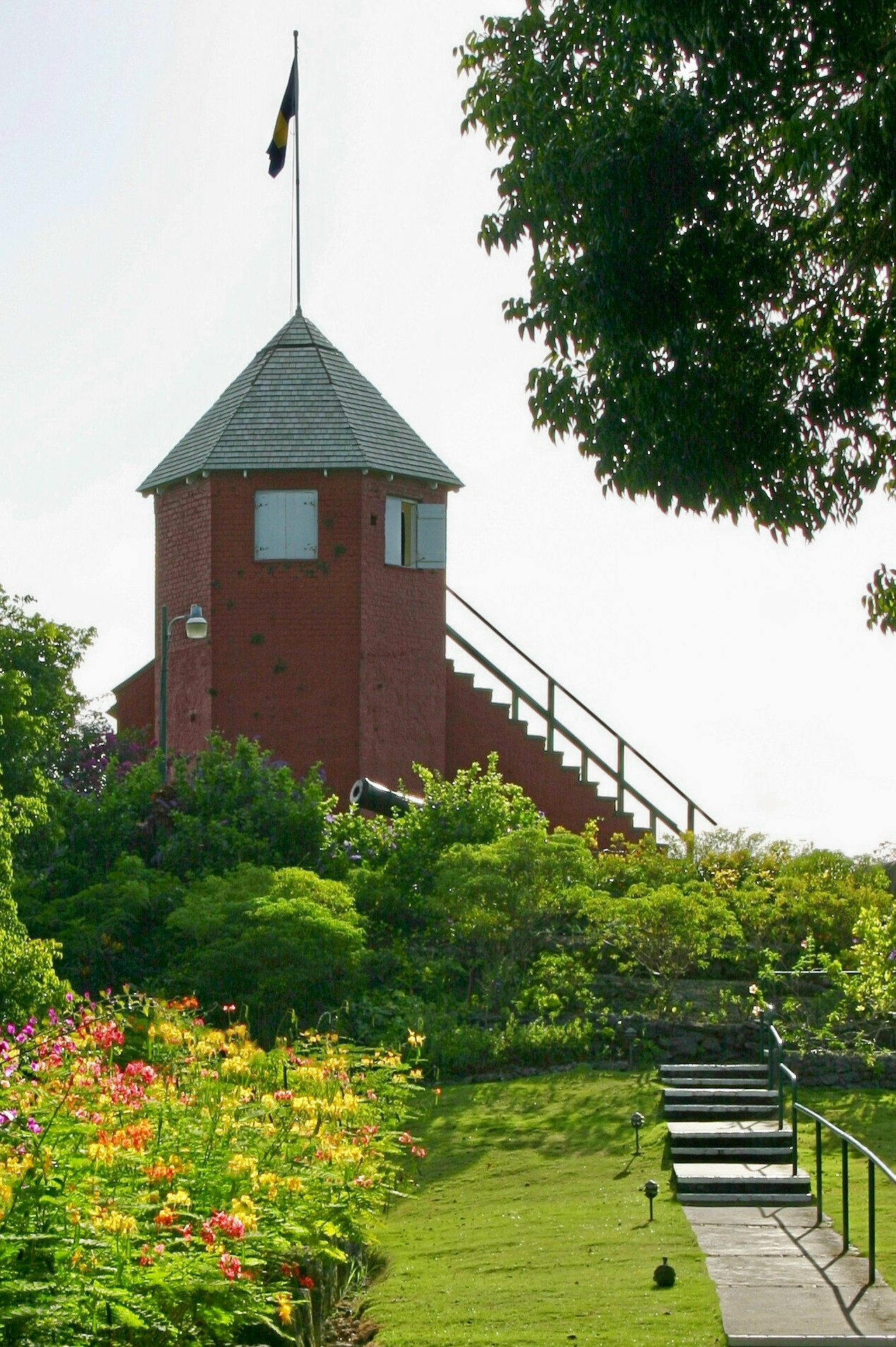
Entrance to Gun Hill Signal Station

Gun Hill Signal Station, St. George is the largest and most important of the military outposts in Barbados, with military associations from at least 1697. In the Militia Act of that year, when it was known as Briggs Hill, it was named as one of the four points where guns were to be placed to give alarm in the event of an invasion, so it is likely that the name Gun Hill goes back nearly 300 years.

When the signal stations were established in 1818–1819, it became the key link in the chain, passing signals from Highgate East to Moncrieffe on the cliffs of the St. John/St. Philip border, and north to the Cotton Tower, Grenade Hall, and Dover Fort (and vice versa). But Gun Hill was also the typical 'Hill Station' of the tropics, used as a convalescent station for the troops, and for evacuation of the Garrison in times of epidemics of yellow fever and once (in 1854) of cholera. There was only a small barrack, and mass evacuations went under canvas.

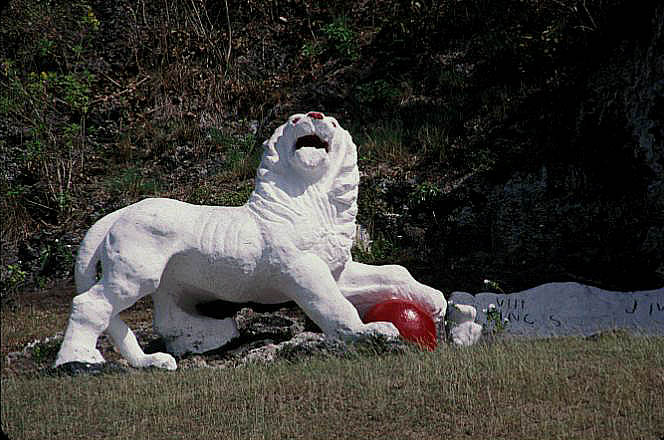
Lion sculpture

After the decline of the signal stations, the Gun Hill buildings fell into complete disrepair. They include the station with its prominent tower, a kitchen, magazine, sentry box, and ruined barracks. On the hillside below is a well-known sculpture of a lion. In 1981, the Barbados National Trust leased the station from the government and restored it with the help of a government grant.
