= HMS Artois (1794) =

Frigate of the Royal Navy, commissioned 1794 and wrecked 1797

- Design of HMS Artois

History

Great Britain
- Name: HMS Artois
- Ordered: 28 March 1793
- Cost: £20,757
- Laid down: March 1793
- Launched: 3 January 1794
- Commissioned: December 1793
- Fate: Wrecked off Île de Ré, 31 July 1797

General characteristics
- Class & type: Artois-class frigate
- Tons burthen: 9965/94 (bm)
- Length: 146 ft 3 in (44.6 m) (gundeck); 121 ft 9 3/4 in (37.1 m) (keel)
- Beam: 39 ft 2 1/2 in (12 m)
- Draught: 10 ft (3 m) (forwards); 15 ft 6 in (4.7 m) (aft)
- Depth of hold: 13 ft 9 in (4.2 m)
- Propulsion: Sails
- Complement: 270
- Armament: Gundeck: 28 × 18-pounder guns; QD: 2 × 9-pounder guns + 12 × 32-pounder carronades; Fc: 2 × 9-pounder guns + 2 × 32-pounder carronades

HMS Artois was a Artois-class frigate of the Royal Navy, designed by Sir John Henslow and launched in 1794 at Rotherhithe as the lead ship of her class. A fifth-rate ship, she served for the majority of her career in the English Channel under the command of Edmund Nagle in the squadrons of Edward Pellew and John Borlase Warren, notably taking part in the action of 21 October 1794 where she captured the 44-gun frigate La Révolutionnaire almost singlehandedly. She participated in a number of other actions and events including the attempted invasion of France in 1795. Artois continued to serve actively on the coast of France in blockade and patrolling roles, taking a large number of ships as prizes, until she was wrecked with no loss of life off Île de Ré on 31 July 1797 while attempting to reconnoitre the harbour of La Rochelle.

== Construction ==
Artois was a fifth-rate 38-gun, 18-pounder, Artois-class frigate designed by Sir John Henslow. She and her class were ordered soon after the start of the French Revolutionary War to provide an influx of modern warships for the Royal Navy. Artois was the name-ship of her class and the first to be laid down; of the nine ships of the class seven, including Artois, were built of oak while the final two were built of fir. Artois was an improvement on the 18-pounder frigates of the American Revolutionary War which were found to be too small and that their battery placement made them unstable at sea. To counter this, Artois and her contemporaries built in the 1790s were lengthened forwards to make them faster and more stable. The extra space provided by this expansion made the ships faster but did not stop the issue of violent pitching, which would not be fixed until HMS Active was launched as an improvement to the Artois-class in 1799. Despite this, the class would go on to gain a reputation as 'crack frigates'. They were perfect for their assigned role as frigates on blockade duties, being large enough to fight any French frigate sent to attack them while on station but also fast enough and weatherly enough to be able to stay at their posts no matter the weather type.

Artois was ordered on 28 March 1793 to be built at Rotherhithe by John and William Wells of Wells & Co. She was laid down in the same month and launched on 3 January 1794 with the following dimensions: 146 feet 3 inches (44.6 m) along the gun deck, 121 feet 9 3/4 inches (37.1 m) at the keel, with a beam of 39 feet 2 1/2 inches (12 m) and a depth in the hold of 13 feet 9 inches (4.2 m). She measured 9965/94 tons burthen. The fitting out process for Artois was completed at Deptford on 30 March. In January 1794 Captain Lord Charles Fitzgerald of Artois requested to the Admiralty that a bridle port, a square porthole in the bow that a gun could be placed in, be fitted to assist in chasing ships, however it was deemed unfeasible to fit one on a ship designed without it. On 19 November eight 32-pound carronades were added to the Artois-class ships by Admiralty Order, leading some to describe them as 44-gun frigates in the future. On 20 June 1796 another Admiralty Order saw the ship's crew complement increase from 270 to 284.

== Service ==
=== 1794 ===
Artois was commissioned under Captain Lord Charles Fitzgerald in December 1793 to serve on the Cork Station. After this Captain Edmund Nagle took command of Artois, but was absent at the beginning of her service, with two temporary captains standing in for him. In April 1794 Artois served at the siege of Bastia under the command of Captain Thomas Byam Martin, where the ships of Admiral Lord Hood's Mediterranean Fleet starved the French garrison out of Bastia. Artois then moved to the English Channel where she was to serve in the Brest blockade squadron of Commodore John Borlase Warren; for a brief period of time she was then commanded by Commander George Byng before Nagle returned to take command of Artois. (Note: Marshall describes Artois as a 44-gun frigate here.) She would spend the majority of her career stationed with the squadron in and around Audierne Bay.

==== Le Volontaire ====
'If they run, why we'll follow, and run them ashore,
And if they won't fight us, what can we do more?'

— Ballad relating to the destruction of Le Volontaire.

On 23 August Artois took part in the destruction of the 36-gun frigate Le Volontaire on the Penmarks. The frigate was discovered early in the morning by Warren's squadron comprising Artois and the frigates HMS Arethusa, HMS Diamond, HMS Flora, HMS Diana, and HMS Santa Margarita. (Note: Marshall and the London Gazette report describe the destroyed frigate as la Felicité of 40 guns, but the actual la Félicité was of 32 guns and was not captured until 1809.) The British ships had left Falmouth on 7 August with the intent of hunting a squadron of French frigates known to be around the Isles of Scilly, but found Le Volontaire off Brittany instead. Le Volontaire was forced by the squadron to anchor off the coast to avoid wrecking, and the British ships attacked her to such a degree that she was forced to cut her cables in an attempt to change her positioning. In doing so La Volontaire was driven ashore and after her pumps failed to remove the incoming water her crew abandoned her. The frigate was unrecoverable and stayed there in its disabled state. The same British ships then discovered the 12-gun brig L'Alerte and 18-gun corvette Espion in the nearby Audierne Bay. The two French ships ran themselves aground under the cover of three batteries of guns. They were then boarded by boats from the squadron and fifty-two prisoners were brought off them; the ships also had a large number of men with injuries that made them unmovable, which meant that the British were not able to destroy the ships, instead leaving them and the wounded where they had grounded. The following night the French succeeded in rescuing Espion, but L'Alerte was lost. On 26 August the ships Queen and Donna Maria were recaptured by the squadron in the same area. The squadron continued its patrols, taking the cutter La Quartidi on 7 September and recapturing the Swedish brig Haesingeland on 16 September.

==== La Révolutionnaire ====
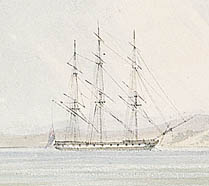
HMS Révolutionnaire, captured by Artois on 21 October 1794

By October Artois was serving in the squadron of Edward Pellew. On 21 October the squadron, comprising Artois, Arethusa, Diamond, and the frigate HMS Galatea, encountered the French 44-gun frigate La Révolutionnaire sailing off Ushant. (Note: See Action of 21 October 1794.) The squadron chased La Révolutionnaire which looked to avoid the force, but the superior sailing qualities of Artois allowed her to sail ahead of the rest of the squadron and come up with La Révolutionnaire before she could escape. The squadron then cut La Révolutionnaire off from the coast which she might have sailed towards for assistance, forcing the French frigate to engage Artois. The two frigates fought an engagement of forty minutes in which eight Frenchmen and three Britons were killed, including the lieutenant of marines. Diamond approached the action next and came up behind La Révolutionnaire, threatening to fire into her stern. La Révolutionnaire surrendered to Artois upon the approach of the rest of Pellew's squadron, as the frigate had been launched only a few weeks previously; the raw crew refused to continue fighting and forced the captain to surrender. (Note: The captured crew of La Révolutionnaire were sent to at first Portchester Castle and then Norman Cross Prison before mostly being exchanged in May 1799.) Pellew reported that the intervention of the rest of the squadron had been unnecessary, and that Artois would have succeeded even if she had been completely unsupported. The French frigate was bought into the navy as HMS Révolutionnaire; Captain Nagle was knighted for his conduct against her and his first lieutenant, Robert Dudley Oliver, was promoted to commander.

=== 1795 ===
After this Artois returned to the command of Commodore Warren and his squadron. On 18 February 1795 the squadron of Artois, Galatea, Arethusa, and Warren's frigate HMS Pomone encountered a French convoy of twenty ships protected by the frigate Néréide off Oléron. The squadron pursued the convoy up the Pertuis d'Antioche towards Île-d'Aix; while the tide forced the British to halt the attack before they reached Aix, they captured one ship, three brigs, two luggers, one sloop, and an 8-gun schooner. As well as this ten brigs and a lugger were destroyed; the convoy had been carrying food and clothing for the French military. The squadron was very busy in February and March, and including those taken on 18 February the squadron took the ships Le Pierre, Le Petit Jean, Le Deux Freres, La Liberte, Le Adelaide, L'Aimable, La Coureause, L'Aimable Madelaine, La Pacquebot de Cayenne, and La Biche between 13 February and 2 March. A strange sail was sighted on 15 April by the squadron, and the signal to give chase given; Artois caught her first, proving it to be the 26-gun corvette Le Jean Bart. On 16 April Artois and Galatea similarly took the 16-gun sloop Expedition, which had previously been a British packet ship, and the ship Maria Francis Fidilla off Rochefort, and Artois on her own captured two sloops with cargoes of fish.

Between June and October she participated in the failed French émigré invasion of France at Quiberon. As such Artois was present in the fleet at the Battle of Groix on 23 June, where she shared in the capture of the three French ships-of-the-line Alexander, Formidable, and Tigre, despite not participating directly in the action that occurred when the British and French fleets came upon one another while on separate missions. The British fleet under Lord Bridport had been convoying the invasion force to France, and Artois was part of a force of three ships-of-the-line and six frigates under Warren guarding the fifty-ship convoy conveying the Comte de Puisaye's émigré force of 2,500 men. The troops were successfully landed on 27 June and Warren's squadron went on to occupy Île d'Yeu, but after a series of reversals against French revolutionary soldiers the entire force was evacuated to England, with Artois and the other ships providing covering fire to the escaping Royalists.

=== 1796 ===
After the failure of this enterprise, Artois returned to her usual duties of blockade and patrols; on 6 March 1796 the ship Sultana was captured, and a day later Nancy also. On 20 March she was sailing with the frigates HMS Anson, Pomone, and Galatea off Pointe du Raz when they discovered a French convoy of seventy ships. The convoy was guarded by the frigates Prosperine, Unite, Coquille, and Tamise, and the corvette Cigogne. Artois and Pomone quickly took four of the convoy ships; one ship and three brigs. These were Illier, Don de Dieu, Paul Edward, and Felicite. The convoy turned away from the squadron, and as the British ships drew closer the French brought their warships together and passed the British in line as they went in the other direction, exchanging fire and heavily damaging Galatea. The British then began a concerted effort to follow the convoy and break through its ranks in a line of battle as it fled towards Brest but failed to bring it to action again, only taking the 28-gun armed store ship Etoile which had been at the rear of the convoy. (Note: Winfield describes Etoile as a frigate instead of an armed store ship.) The four French frigates and the corvette all escaped under the cover of night, while the majority of the convoy took shelter under the protection of some coastal gun batteries. Commodore Warren in Pomone was criticised for not doing more to press his advantage against the convoy, in all taking only six of the ships. The squadron took the ships La Marie, L'Union, La Bonne, and a brig between 7 and 13 April. Finding continued success, Artois took Pacific on 14 May, Lodoiska on 22 May, and Fantasie on 25 May, and the chasse-marées Charlotte and Veronique on 16 August.

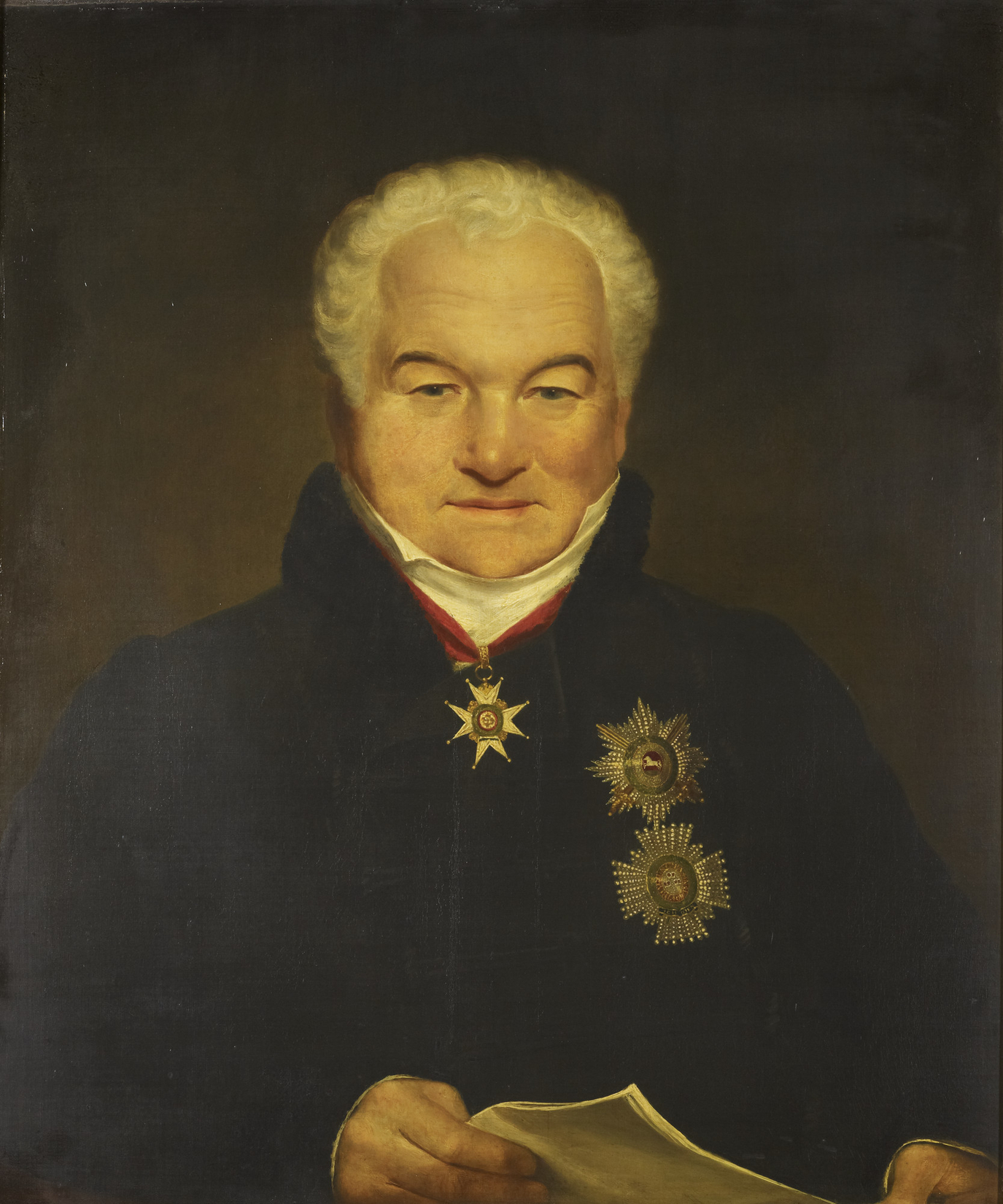
Sir Edmund Nagle, who commanded Artois for almost all her service

==== Andromaque ====
On 22 August Artois was in company with the same squadron of ships and the brig-sloop HMS Sylph off the mouth of the river Gironde, when the French frigate Andromaque came into sight attempting to enter the river. Andromaque had been cruising in a squadron with two other frigates and a corvette, but had left their company after springing a leak. Galatea was closest to the enemy and began a chase of it, followed by Pomone and Anson, while Artois and Sylph were sent to investigate the appearance of two other strange sails. The chase continued through the night, and by 4 a.m. on 23 August Galatea and Andromaque were only one mile offshore. At day break Artois and Sylph came into sight, having ascertained that the strange sails were neutral American merchants, and at 5:30 a.m. Andromaque attempted to make her escape from the squadron, but at 6 a.m. she ran herself aground close to Arcachon, losing all her masts. Artois, Galatea, and Sylph sent their boats in to take control of the unresisting frigate; before they reached it many of the ship's crew jumped into the rough seas rather than be captured, while the rest were able to walk from the stranded frigate to the coast once the tide had gone out. In the evening of 23 August boats from Sylph set fire to Andromaque which then exploded.

On 2 November Artois and Warren's squadron were in company with the fleet of Lord Bridport when she took the 12-gun privateer Le Franklin off Ushant after a chase alongside the frigate HMS Thalia. In December Artois began a string of successes, taking a brig and the chasse-marées Le Providence and La Maria Theresa on 11 December, a Spanish brig on 14 December, and another Spanish brig Divina Pastora on 17 December.

=== 1797 ===
The activity of Artois's squadron continued into 1797, taking Le Jean Amie on 15 February, Nordzee on 16 March, and recapturing the whaler Mary on 25 April. On 16 July a French convoy of fourteen ships guarded by the frigate La Calliope and two corvettes was discovered and chased by Warren's squadron, comprising the same ships as last noted and the cutter Dolly. The corvettes succeeded in escaping into Audierne Bay, but La Calliope was unable to run from the squadron and was made to engage it. In order to escape destruction La Calliope cut away her masts and ran herself aground on the Penmarks early in the morning of 17 July. To stop the French from removing the stores from La Calliope, Anson and Sylph bombarded the stranded ship while Artois and Pomone watched from further out to sea. La Calliope broke up on the rocks on 18 July.

== Fate ==
On 31 July 1797 Artois was wrecked on a sandbank near the Ballieu rocks on the north-west coast of Île de Ré. She had been attempting to reconnoitre the harbour of La Rochelle; the entire crew was saved by Sylph. (Note: Artois may have been chasing a French frigate at the time of her grounding.) The pilot and master of Artois were condemned for their negligence in causing the wreck.

== Prizes ==
Vessels captured or destroyed for which Artois's crew received full or partial credit
Date	Ship	Nationality	Type	Fate	Ref.
23 August 1794	Le Volontaire	French	36-gun frigate	Destroyed	
23 August 1794	L'Alerte	French	12-gun brig	Destroyed	
26 August 1794	Queen	British	Merchant vessel	Recaptured	
26 August 1794	Donna Maria	Spanish	Merchant vessel	Recaptured	
7 September 1794	Le Quartidi	French	Cutter	Captured	
16 September 1794	Haesingeland	Swedish	Merchant vessel	Recaptured	
21 October 1794	La Révolutionnaire	French	44-gun frigate	Captured	
18 February 1795	Not recorded	French	Merchant brig	Destroyed	
18 February 1795	Not recorded	French	Merchant brig	Destroyed	
18 February 1795	Not recorded	French	Merchant brig	Destroyed	
18 February 1795	Not recorded	French	Merchant brig	Destroyed	
18 February 1795	Not recorded	French	Merchant brig	Destroyed	
18 February 1795	Not recorded	French	Merchant brig	Destroyed	
18 February 1795	Not recorded	French	Merchant brig	Destroyed	
18 February 1795	Not recorded	French	Merchant brig	Destroyed	
18 February 1795	Not recorded	French	Merchant brig	Destroyed	
18 February 1795	Not recorded	French	Merchant brig	Destroyed	
18 February 1795	Not recorded	French	Lugger	Destroyed	
13 February-2 March 1795	Le Pierre	French	Merchant vessel	Captured	
13 February-2 March 1795	Le Petit Jean	French	Merchant vessel	Captured	
13 February-2 March 1795	Le Deux Freres	French	Merchant vessel	Captured	
13 February-2 March 1795	La Liberte	French	Merchant vessel	Captured	
13 February-2 March 1795	Le Adelaide	French	Merchant vessel	Captured	
13 February-2 March 1795	L'Aimable	French	Merchant vessel	Captured	
13 February-2 March 1795	La Coureause	French	Merchant vessel	Captured	
13 February-2 March 1795	L'Aimable Madelaine	French	Merchant vessel	Captured	
13 February-2 March 1795	La Pacquebot de Cayenne	French	Merchant vessel	Captured	
13 February-2 March 1795	La Biche	French	Merchant vessel	Captured	
15 April 1795	Le Jean Bart	French	26-gun corvette	Captured	
16 April 1795	Expedition	French	16-gun sloop	Captured	
16 April 1795	Maria Francis Fidilla	Spanish	Merchant vessel	Captured	
16 April 1795	Not recorded	French	Merchant sloop	Captured	
16 April 1795	Not recorded	French	Merchant sloop	Captured	
23 June 1795	Alexander	French	74-gun ship-of-the-line	Captured	
23 June 1795	Tigre	French	74-gun ship-of-the-line	Captured	
23 June 1795	Formidable	French	74-gun ship-of-the-line	Captured	
6 March 1796	Sultana	French	Merchant vessel	Captured	
7 March 1796	Nancy	French	Merchant vessel	Captured	
20 March 1796	L'Etoile	French	28-gun armed store ship	Captured	
20 March 1796	Illier	French	Merchant vessel	Captured	
20 March 1796	Don de Dieu	French	Merchant brig	Captured	
20 March 1796	Paul Edward	French	Merchant brig	Captured	
20 March 1796	Felicite	French	Merchant brig	Captured	
20 March 1796	Not recorded	French	Merchant vessel	Captured	
7–13 April 1796	La Marie	French	Merchant vessel	Captured	
7–13 April 1796	L'Union	French	Merchant vessel	Captured	
7–13 April 1796	La Bonne	French	Merchant vessel	Captured	
7–13 April 1796	Not recorded	French	Merchant brig	Captured	
14 May 1796	Pacific	French	Merchant vessel	Captured	
22 May 1796	Lodoiska	French	Merchant vessel	Captured	
25 May 1796	Fantasie	French	Merchant vessel	Captured	
16 August 1796	Charlotte	French	Chasse-marée	Captured	
16 August 1796	Veronique	French	Chasse-marée	Captured	
23 August 1796	Andromaque	French	32-gun frigate	Destroyed	
2 November 1796	Le Franklin	French	12-gun privateer	Captured	
11 December 1796	Le Providence	French	Chasse-marée	Captured	
11 December 1796	La Maria Theresa	French	Chasse-marée	Captured	
14 December 1796	Not recorded	Spanish	Merchant brig	Captured	
17 December 1796	Divina Pastora	Spanish	Merchant brig	Captured	
15 February 1797	Le Jean Amie	French	Merchant vessel	Captured	
16 March 1797	Nordzee	Dutch	Merchant vessel	Captured	
25 April 1797	Mary	British	Whaler	Recaptured	
17 July 1797	La Calliope	French	28-gun frigate	Destroyed	
