= Lumsden baronets =

Extinct baronetcy in the Baronetage of the United Kingdom

The Lumsden Baronetcy, of Auchindour in the County of Aberdeen, was a title in the Baronetage of the United Kingdom. It was created on 9 August 1821 for Sir Harry Niven-Lumsden. He had already been knighted in 1816. Lumsden had no legitimate surviving male issue and the title became extinct on his early death in December 1821, having held the title for only four months.

== Lumsden baronets, of Auchindour (1821) ==
- Sir Harry Niven Lumsden, 1st Baronet (died 15 December 1821)

Baronetage of the United Kingdom
Preceded by Kerrison baronets	Lumsden baronets of Auchindour; 9 August 1821	Succeeded by Fremantle baronets
