= HMS Arethusa (1781) =

Frigate of the Royal Navy

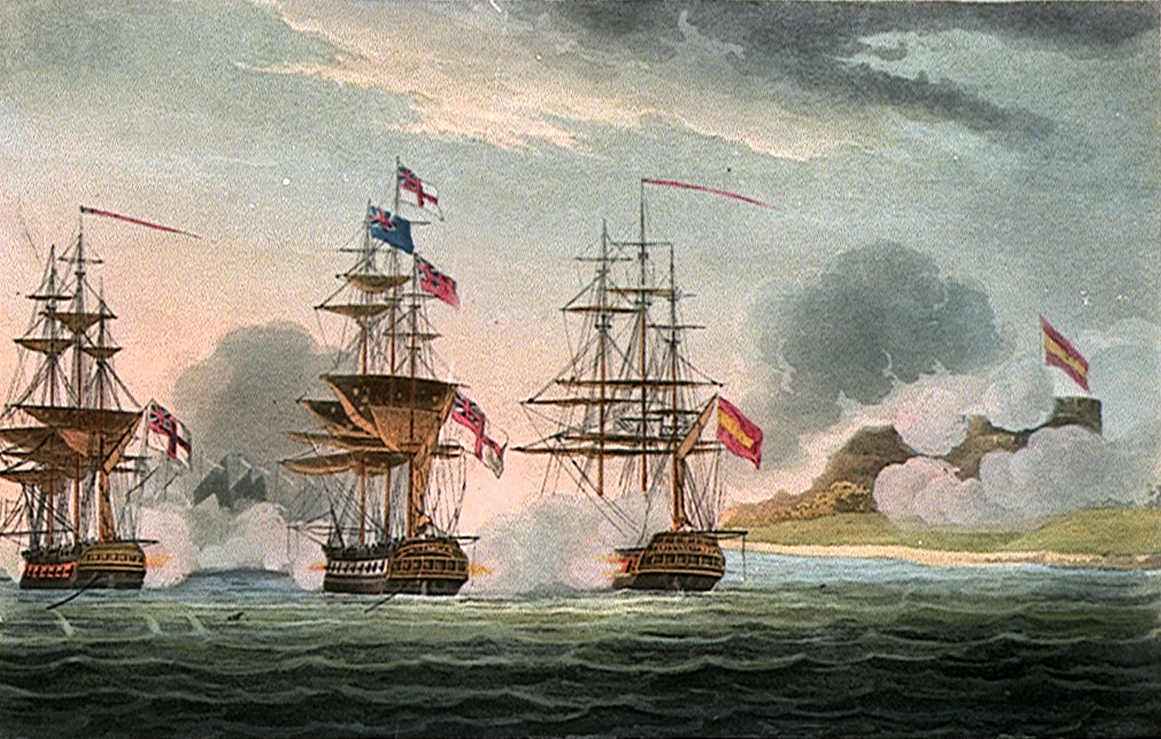
- Anson (left) and Arethusa (centre) capture Pomona in 1806

History

Great Britain
- Name: HMS Arethusa
- Ordered: 1779
- Laid down: 1779
- Launched: 10 April 1781
- Commissioned: 1 June 1781
- Honours and awards: Naval General Service Medal with clasp "Curacoa 1 Jany. 1807"
- Fate: Broken up, 1815

General characteristics
- Class & type: 38-gun Minerva-class fifth-rate frigate
- Tons burthen: 948 bm
- Length: 141 ft 2 in (43.03 m)
- Beam: 39 ft 0 in (11.89 m)
- Depth of hold: 13 ft 9 in (4.19 m)
- Sail plan: Full-rigged ship
- Complement: 280
- Armament: UD: 28 × 18-pounder guns; QD: 8 × 9-pounder guns + 6 × 18-pounder carronades; Fc: 2 × 9-pounder guns 4 × 18-pounder carronades

HMS Arethusa was a 38-gun Minerva-class fifth-rate frigate of the Royal Navy built at Bristol in 1781. She served in three wars and made a number of notable captures before she was broken up in 1815.

== American Revolutionary War ==
In February 1782, Arethusa captured the French ship Tartare, of fourteen 6-pounder guns. Tartare was the former British privateer Tartar, which the French ships Aimable and Diligente had captured in September 1780. The Royal Navy took Tartare into service as True Briton. (Note: Lloyds List reported that Tartar was the former British cutter True Briton.)

On 20 August 1782, Arethusa recaptured the former British warship Thorn. She was armed with 18 guns and carrying a crew of 71 men. She was also carrying a cargo of 10,000 pounds (4,500 kg) of indigo and eight hogsheads of tobacco.

== French Revolutionary Wars ==
Arethusa was assigned to the British Western Frigate Squadron under Commodore John Borlase Warren. The squadron consisted of Flora, Captain Sir John Warren, Arethusa, Captain Sir Edward Pellew (later Lord Exmouth), Melampus, Captain Thomas Wells, Concorde, Sir Richard Strachan, and Nymphe, Captain George Murray. These were all 36-gun ships, apart from Nymphe and Arethusa with 38.

The Western Frigate Squadron engaged a French squadron off the Île de Batz on 23 April 1794. The squadron had sighted four strange sail which, upon closure, were identified as three French frigates and a corvette. The French squadron included the new French frigate Pomone which, at 44 guns, was the most powerful ship in action that day. Flora and Arethusa were the first to close with Pomone and Babet, the corvette of 20 guns. The opening shots were fired just before 6 a.m. For about forty-five minutes, the four ships manoeuvred against one another without any severe damage being done. Then Flora lost her mainmast and was forced to drop astern. With Flora out of action, Pellew ordered Arethusa to close with the corvette. Arethusa's carronades quickly destroyed her resistance. Leaving Babet to be finished by Melampus, Arethusa then engaged Pomone, coming to within pistol range at 8.30 a.m. and raking her repeatedly. Within twenty-five minutes one of the finest new French frigates was a ruin, her main and mizzen masts shot away and a fire burning on her aft deck. Just after 9 a.m., Pomone struck her colors.

Melampus and Arethusa captured Babet. The action had cost Babet some 30 to 40 of her crew killed and wounded. Arethusa also captured Pomone which had between eighty and a hundred dead or wounded out of her 350-man complement. Arethusa had three men killed and five wounded, a tribute to her superior gunnery. The captured vessels were brought her into Portsmouth, arriving on 30 April. The Royal Navy took Babet and Pomone into service under their existing names. Additionally Concorde captured Engageante in this action. Engageante suffered 30 to 40 men killed and wounded. Concorde lost one man killed and 12 wounded. Heavy mast damage to both vessels delayed their return to Portsmouth. Engageante was taken into British service as a hospital ship.

Some four months later, on 23 August, Arethusa and Flora sent their boats into Audierne Bay. There they attacked two French corvettes, Alerte and Espion, driving them ashore. The British took 52 prisoners.

On 21 October, the British frigate Artois captured Révolutionnaire at the action of 21 October 1794. Artois shared the prize money with the other frigates in her squadron, Arethusa, Diamond, and Galatea. (Note: The preliminary payment was £10,000, yielding each of the captains some £312.)

On 31 January 1795 Arethusa was part of a squadron under Captain Sir John Borlase Warren that captured the Dutch East India ship Ostenhuyson.

Later that year Arethusa, under the command of Captain Mark Robinson, was one of the Royal Navy vessels under Borlase Warren's command that participated in the unsuccessful Quiberon Expedition.

Arethusa was part of a fleet under the command of Rear Admiral Sir Henry Harvey, commander-in-chief for the Navy in the Leeward Islands, aboard Prince of Wales, that in February 1797 captured the Spanish-held Caribbean island of Trinidad. The flotilla sailed from Carriacou on 15 February and arrived off Port of Spain the next day. At Port of Spain they found a Spanish squadron consisting of four ships of the line and a frigate, all under the command of Rear-Admiral Don Sebastian Ruiz de Apodaca. Harvey sent Favourite and some of the other smaller ships to protect the transports and anchored his own ships of the line opposite the Spanish squadron. At 2am on 17 February the British discovered that four of the five Spanish vessels were on fire; they were able to capture the 74-gun San Domaso but the others were destroyed. (Note: The five Spanish ships were San Vincente (Captain Don Geronimo Mendoza; 84 guns), Gallardo (Captain Don Gabriel Sororido; 74 guns), Arrogante (Captain Don Raphael Benasa; 74 guns), San Damaso (Don Tores Jordan; 74 guns), and Santa Cecilia (Captain Don Manuel Urtesabel; 36 guns).) Later that morning General Sir Ralph Abercrombie landed the troops. Captain Wolley of Arethusa superintended the landing. The Governor of Trinidad, José Maria Chacón, surrendered the next day. The flotilla shared in the allocation of £40,000 for the proceeds of the ships taken at Trinidad and of the property found on the island.

On 17 April, Arethusa, along with 60 other warships and transports, appeared off the Spanish colonial port city of San Juan, Puerto Rico. The fleet landed a 7,000-man invasion force of Royal Marines, German mercenaries, and black militia troops from the island of Tobago, commanded by General Sir Ralph Abercromby (also spelled "Abercrombie"). However, the resolute Spanish defense forced the British to withdraw after two weeks.

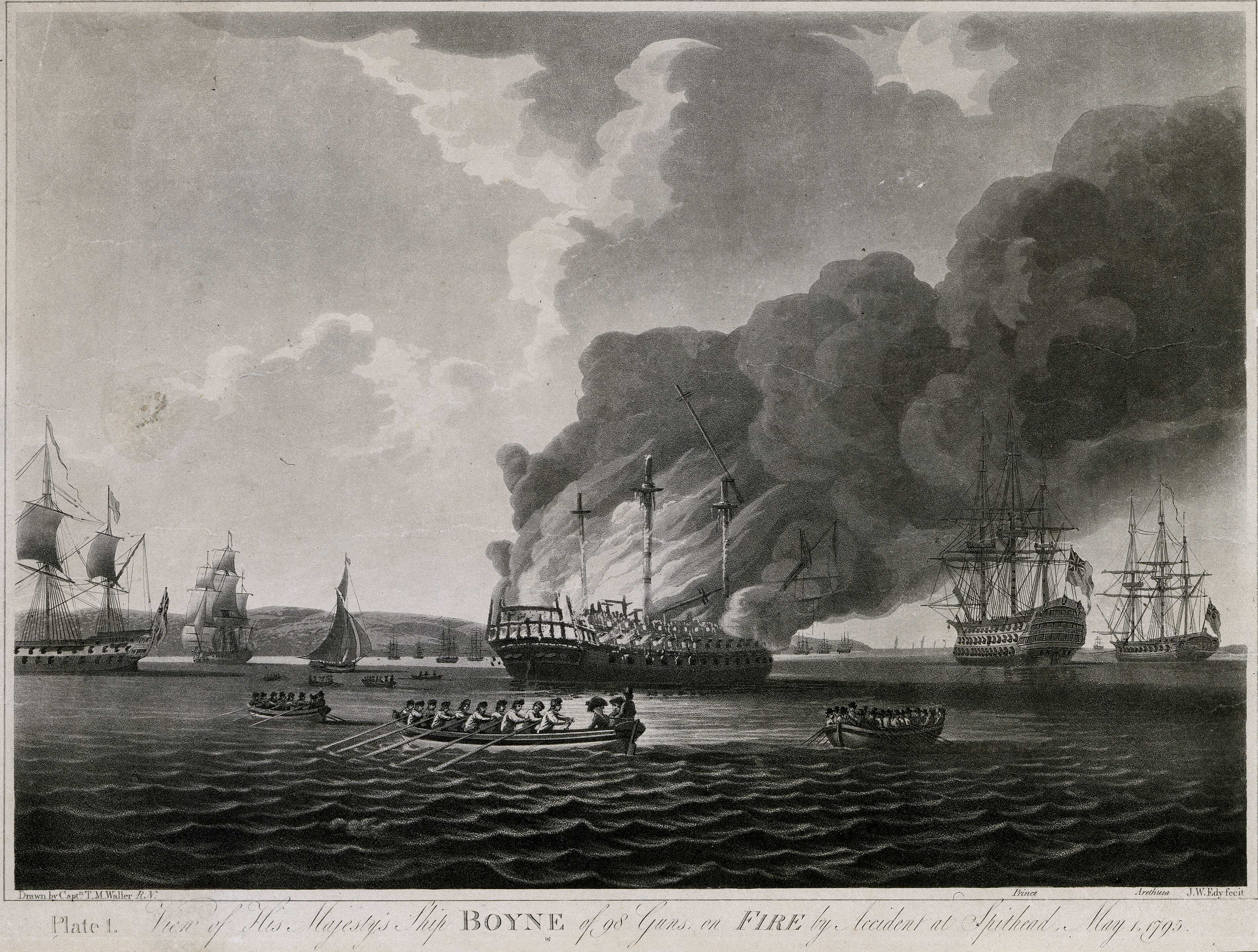
Arethusa (here on the far right at Spithead) witnessed the destruction of Boyne by an accidental fire, 1 May 1795

At daybreak on 10 August, Arethusa, commanded by Captain Thomas Wolley, was in the Atlantic Ocean at 30°49′N 55°50′W when she sighted three ships to windward. At 7:30 a.m. one of the ships bore down to within half gunshot, and opened fire. She proved to be the French 514-ton corvette Gaieté, commanded by Enseigne de vaisseau Jean-François Guignier. Having taken on a ship almost twice her size, mounting forty-four 18-pounder guns, there could only be one outcome, and the French ship was captured within half an hour, having sustained considerable damage to her sails and rigging, and lost two seamen killed and eight wounded. Arethusa lost one seaman killed, and the captain's clerk and two seamen wounded. The Royal Navy took Gaieté into service as Gaiete.

On 22 August 1798 a force of 1,100 French soldiers landed in County Mayo to support a major rebellion in Ireland and the militias across the whole of the south of England were mobilized. On 30 August Arethusa arrived at Portsmouth from the coast of France and immediately sailed for Southampton River to embark the Dorset and Devon Militias

In May 1799 Arethusa came upon seven enemy vessels which made to engage her, but then turned away when she sailed towards them in "a spirited style". Arethusa captured one, an armed ship, which was carrying sundries from Saint-Domingue. Spitfire took the prize into Plymouth on the 23rd while Arethusa sailed off in search of the other six.

== Napoleonic Wars ==
On 12 December 1805, Arethusa, Boadicea and Wasp left Cork, escorting a convoy of 23 merchant vessels. Four days later the convoy encountered a French squadron consisting of five ships of the line and four sailing frigates, as well as nine other vessels that were too far away for assessment. A letter writer to the Naval Chronicle, describing the encounter, surmised that the distant vessels were the Africa squadron that had been escorted by Lark and that they had captured. On this occasion, the British warships and six merchant vessels went one way and the rest went another way. The French chased the warships and the six for a day, ignored the 17, and eventually gave up their pursuit. Boadicea then shadowed the French while Wasp went back to French and Spanish coasts to alert the British warships there. Arethusa and her six charges encountered the French squadron again the next day, but after a desultory pursuit the French sailed off.

During the action of 23 August 1806, Arethusa and Anson captured the Spanish frigate Pomona, (Note: The capture gave her the unusual distinction of having captured both a French and a Spanish frigate named after the Roman goddess of plenty.) as well as destroying a shore battery and defeating a fleet of gunboats. The captured frigate was taken into the Royal Navy as HMS Cuba.

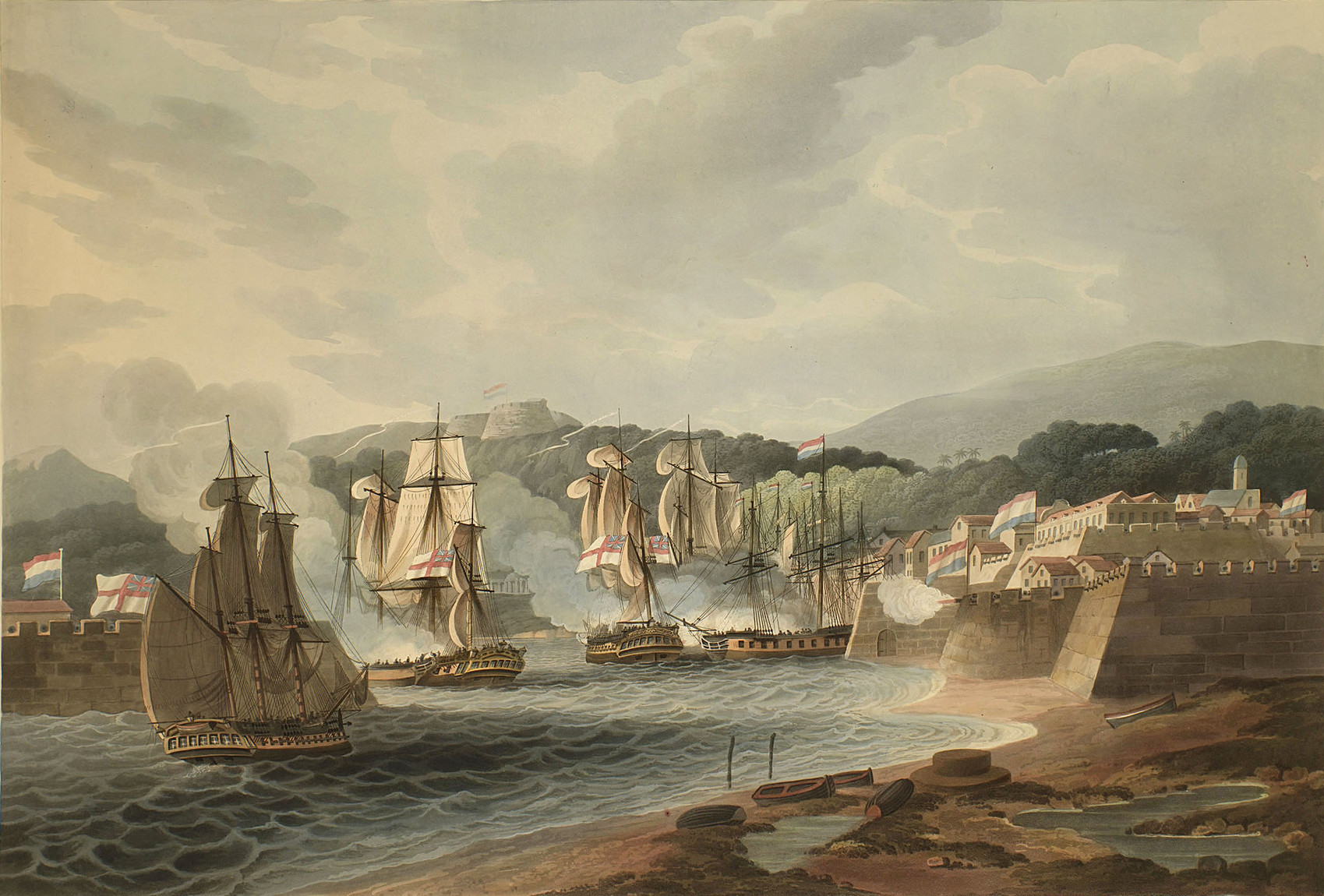
The capture of Curaçao on 1 January 1807

On 1 January 1807 Arethusa, Latona, Anson, Fisgard, and Morne Fortunee captured Curaçao. The Dutch resisted and Arethusa lost two men killed and five wounded; in all, the British lost three killed and 14 wounded. On the ships alone, the Dutch lost six men killed, including Commandant Cornelius J. Evertz, who commanded the Dutch naval force in Curaçao and seven wounded, of whom one died later. With the colony, the British captured the frigate Kenau Hasselar, the sloop Suriname (a former Royal Naval sloop), and two naval schooners. In 1847 the Admiralty authorized the issue of the Naval General Service Medal with clasp "Curacoa 1 Jany. 1807" to any surviving claimants from the action; 65 medals were issued.

On 29 November 1808, Arethusa was some eight or nine leagues (39 or 43 km) north west of Alderney when she sighted and gave chase to a lugger making for the coast of France. After four hours Arethusa captured her quarry, which turned out to be the privateer Général Ernouf, of Calais, but eight days out of Cherbourg without having made any captures. She was armed with 16 guns and had a crew of 58 men under the command of Jacques Antoine de Boulogne. Boulogne had some 15 years experience of successful cruising against British trade, all without ever having been captured. Captain Robert Mends, in his letter, was fulsome in his praise of Général Ernouf, recommending that the Royal Navy acquire her.

On 4 April 1809, HMS Amethyst, HMS Emerald, and Arethusa encountered the newly built French frigate Niémen. Amethyst and Emerald gave chase, with Emerald falling behind. Amethyst caught up the next day. Amethyst and Niémen engaged each other in a bitter battle. Arethusa arrived on the scene that evening, firing a couple of broadsides at the badly damaged French ship. Either at this point, or the next morning, Niémen surrendered. The Royal Navy took her into service as Niemen.

Between 26 and 27 February, Arethusa and Resistance captured four vessels off the coast of Spain: the 1-gun Mouche No. 4, Etiennette, Charsier, master, (Note: St Etiennnett, a lugger of 501/74 tons (bm), and her cargo were auctioned at Plymouth on 9 June 1809.) Nancy, Subibelle, master, (Note: Nancy, a lugger of 591/72 tons (bm), and her cargo were auctioned at Plymouth on 9 June 1809.) and a chasse-maree of unknown name. Arethusa shared in the proceeds of the capture of Mouche No. 4, which was under the command of M. Sorrel. A boat under the command of Lieutenant Joseph William Bazalgette of Resistance, captured Mouche on 26 February 1809 in an action that resulted in the death of the lieutenant de vaiseau commanding her.

In May 1811 Arethusa sailed to Cape Verde as escort to a convoy East Indiamen bound for the India and China. Captain Cofffin's orders were to separate from the convoy at Cape Verde, sail to Goree, and then cruise the coast of West Africa as far as the Island of Saint Thomas and back to Cape Verde, then returning to Spithead. While cruising the coast Arethusa was to examine bays and creeks looking for vessels engaged in the slave trade. In late June Arethusa grounded on a sunken rock off Factory Island in the Isles de Los. Her launch reached Freetown, Sierra Leone on 1 July, and Tigress and Myrtle sailed to her assistance, joined a few days later by Protector. On 7 July Arethusa, making six feet of water per hour, set sail for Freetown, together with Tigress Myrtle, and Protector, and Arethusa's two prizes, the American schooner Hawke and Harriet. They arrived at Freetown on 9 July. The court at Freetown condemned both Hawke and Harriet, though Harriet was later restored to her owners. Arethusa was repaired at Freetown but cut her mission short and arrived back at Plymouth on 12 September for further repair and refitting. (Note: In 1811 the future author Frederick Chamier served as a midshipman on Arethusa while she was engaged in anti-slave trade duties. Later, he drew on his experiences in his autobiography and novels.)

== Fate ==
Arethusa was broken up in 1815.
