= HMS Polecat =

Brig of the Royal Navy

History

Great Britain
- Name: HMS Polecat
- Namesake: Polecat
- Acquired: 1782 by purchase
- Captured: 1782

General characteristics
- Tons burthen: 100 (bm)
- Propulsion: Sails
- Armament: Pennsylvania: 10 guns; Royal Navy: 14 guns

HMS Polecat was the Pennsylvania privateer Navarro, Captain William Keeler, which HMS Orpheus captured in March 1782. Between her commissioning on 18 July 1781 under Captain Woolman Sutton and her capture, Navarro captured two British vessels and recaptured one American vessel. One vessel that Navarro captured was Rebecca, M'Fadzean, master, which was sailing from Jamaica to London when Navarro captured Rebecca at 44°00′N 26°50′W, north of the Azores. (Note: Rebecca, M'Fadz'n, master, Clark & Co., owner, of 280 tons (bm), had been launched in 1775 at Philadelphia.)

The Royal Navy purchased Navarre at Boston for £1097 3s 5d and took her into service as the 14-gun brig-sloop HMS Polecat. She was initially under the command of Lieutenant Edmund Nagle, but Lieutenant the Honourable Patrick Napier succeeded him. Two French frigates chased her off the coast of Virginia on 31 July 1782; Émeraude effected the actual capture. Polecat was taken into York River, Virginia about 13 August. Her subsequent disposition is unknown.
