= Brighton, Barbados =

Town in the parish of Saint George, Barbados

Coordinates: 13.123°N 59.530°W

Brighton is a town located in the Parish of Saint George, Barbados.
