= Kerrison baronets =

Extinct baronetcy in the Baronetage of the United Kingdom

The Kerrison Baronetcy, of Hoxne and Brome in the County of Suffolk, was a title in the Baronetage of the United Kingdom. It was created on 8 August 1821 for the soldier and politician Edward Kerrison who served in the Peninsular War and commanded the 7th Light Dragoons at the Battle of Waterloo. He was succeeded by his son, the second Baronet who sat as member of parliament for Eye. The title became extinct on his death in 1886.

== Kerrison baronets, of Hoxne Hall (1821) ==
- Sir Edward Kerrison, 1st Baronet (1776–1853)
- Sir Edward Clarence Kerrison, 2nd Baronet (1821–1886)

Baronetage of the United Kingdom
Preceded by Harnage baronets	Kerrison baronets of Hoxne Hall; 8 August 1821	Succeeded by Lumsden baronets
