= Lion (1809 ship) =

UK merchant ship (1809–1813)

History

Spain
- Launched: 1802
- Fate: Transferred to British ownership c.1809

United Kingdom
- Name: Lion
- Owner: Elvine & Co.
- Acquired: c.1809
- Fate: Wrecked 1813

General characteristics
- Tons burthen: 607, or 617, or 618, or 620 (bm)
- Complement: 45
- Armament: 1809:20 × 6&9&12*18-pounder cannons + 4 swivel guns; 1810:8 × 9-pounder guns + 4 × 18 + 4 × 12 + 4 × 9–pounder carronades

Lion was launched in 1803 in Turkey, or 1802 in Spain. British owners acquired her in 1809, probably by purchase of a prize. She was a merchantman and letter of marque. She captured an American privateer in a notable single-ship action in 1813, some months before Lion was wrecked in 1813.

== Career ==
By one account, Lion was built as a frigate for the British government as a present to the Turks. Plans changed and she was sold to private interests.

Lion first appeared in the registers in 1810. The Register of Shipping (RS) gave her origin as Turkey and her launch year as 1803. (By 1813, RS no longer had an origin for Lyon.) Lloyd's Register (LR) gave her origin as Spain, and her launch year as 1802.

Year	Master	Owner	Trade	Source
1810	Thompson	Alwyn	Plymouth	RS
1810	Thompson	Elvine & Co.	London–Brazils	LR

Captain James Thompson acquired a letter of marque on 22 September 1809. Lion sailed for the Brazils on 30 July 1809. She had to put back, but sailed again on 2 November.

Lion was reported to have sailed from Deal on 27 January 1813 bound for a cruise in the China Sea.

On 22 March 1813, Lion captured the American privateer schooner Matilda off Pernambuco in a severe single-ship action. Matilda, of Philadelphia, was armed with 12 guns and had a crew of 50 men. She had been cruising for 52 days and had taken one prize. Lion suffered two men killed and Captain Thompson and eight men wounded. Matilda lost her captain, first lieutenant, and four men killed, and her second lieutenant and 21 men wounded. By one account, some of Matilda's crew were killed after she had struck.

American records show Matilda, H. Rantin, master, with 11 guns and 104 men. She captured one schooner and one brig. The brig Ranger, John Heard, master, that she captured resisted and lost her master. Ranger, of six guns, had been sailing from Santo Domingo to London with a cargo of coffee and logwood. The capture took place at 29°N 64°W. The schooner Single-Cap, which Matilda had taken arrived at Philadelphia on 22 October 1812.

The American records showed Lion with 28 guns and 120 men. At least one account described Lion as a man-of-war. Another report stated that the action took place off San Salvador and that Matida had approached Lyon under the mistaken impression that Lyon was the weaker ship.

Apparently Captain Rantin of Matilda had succeeded in boarding Lion as her British crew had fled below. However, a heavy sea parted the two vessels and the rest of Matilda's crew were unable to follow. Lion's crew rallied and over-powered the American boarders. Lion then approached Matilda, which struck.

The British landed the surviving American crew at Bahia. William, Davis, master, then sailed for New York as a cartel. The British put a prize crew on Matilda. By one account, the American privateer Argus recaptured Matilda. Another account states that the American vessel that recaptured Matilda was the USS Argus Then HMS Revolutionnaire recaptured Matilda on 25 July near Ushant. Matilda arrived at Plymouth on 29 July.

Also on 29 July, the sloop Constitution, of Liverpool, came into Scilly. By one account, the United States privateer Yankee Doodle had captured Constitution, but Lion had recaptured Constitution at Grand Sierra (Serra Grande), on the coast of Brazil. Lloyd's List gave the name of Constitution's captor as Yankee, the date of capture as 4 March, and the locus as off the coast of Africa. It described her as a cutter, and reported that Constitution had been sent into Serra. There Matilda, a prize to Lion, had taken possessions of Constitution on 9 June. As Constitution approached Scilly, two French privateer luggers chased her in.

Lion, Thompson, master, was last listed in LR in 1813 with Elvine & Co., owners, and trade London–Malta.

== Fate ==
LL reported on 8 October 1813, that in mid-July the privateer Lion, Thompson, master, had wrecked between Pernambuco and Bahia, Brazil. Her crew was saved.

== Court case ==
The sequence of captures and recaptures gave rise to a court case over head money due to Lion and Revolutionnaire. On 16 December 1813 the court ruled that head money for 80 men was due to Lion and 15 to Revolutionnaire. The recaptures did not extinguish the military character of the vessel. The court found that Matilda had had 81 men on board, of whom five were killed and 24 wounded. Lion had landed 24, and a surgeon, at Pernambuco. She landed 47 at Salvador where the US consul gave a receipt for the 24 men landed at Pernambuco. The four remaining men of her crew were officers and were released on parole.
