= Saint George, Barbados =

Saint George
- Parish
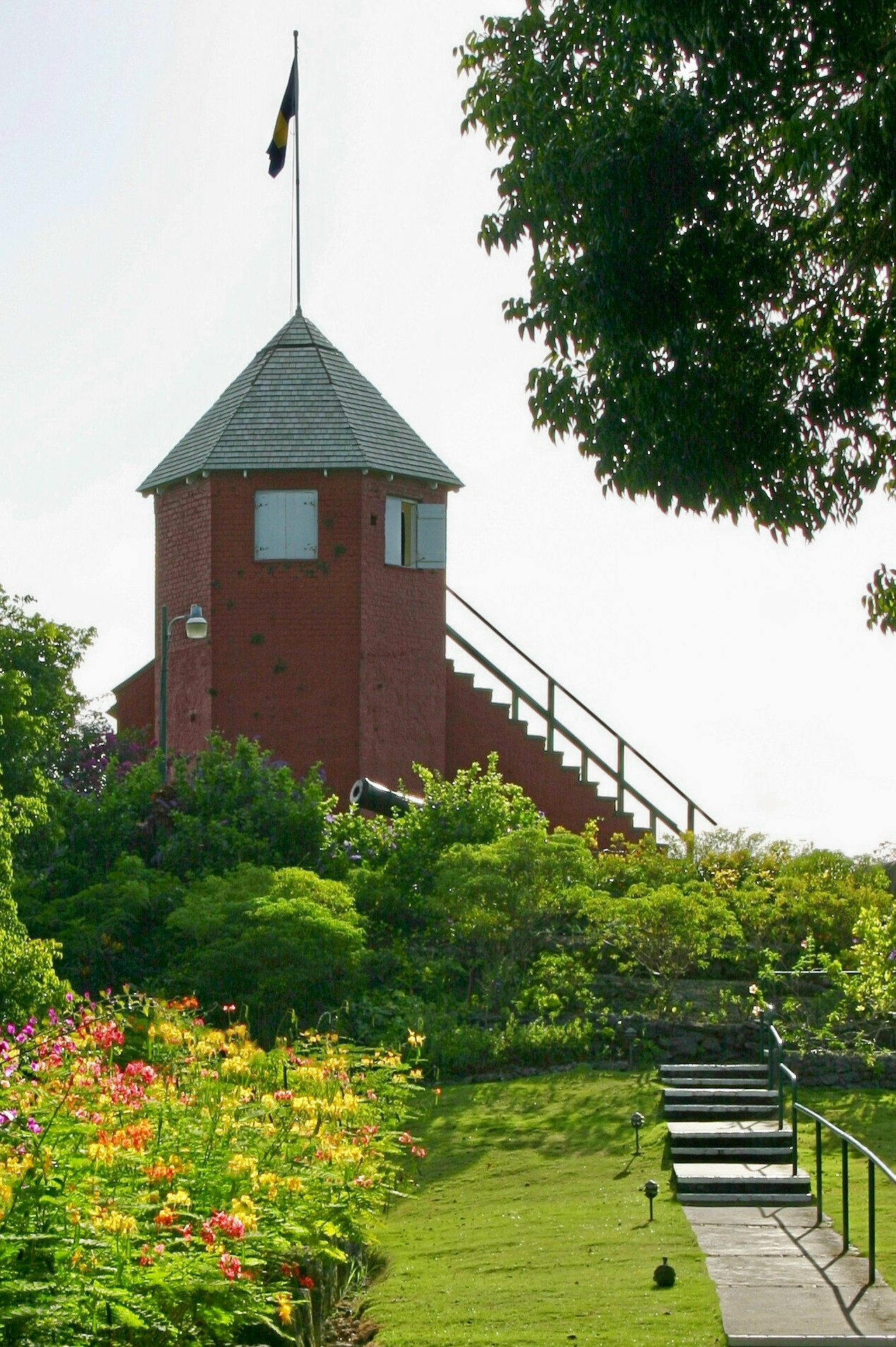

- Map of Barbados showing Saint George
- Coordinates: 13°08′N 59°32′W
- Country: Barbados
- Largest city: The Glebe

Government
  - Type: Parliamentary democracy
  - Parliamentary seats: 2

Area
  - Total: 44 km^{2} (17 sq mi)

Population (2020)
  - Total: 21,940
  - Density: 500/km^{2} (1,300/sq mi)
- ISO 3166 code: BB-03

St. George is a parish of Barbados. It is one of two landlocked parishes, the other being Saint Thomas to the north. It borders six of the eleven other parishes. Covering an area of approximately 45 km^{2} (17 sq mi), it housed around 21,940 residents as per the 2020 official statistics. The area remains predominantly rural, with small villages, agricultural land, and key historical sites, including the Gun Hill Signal Station, which dates back to 1818.

== Geography ==
Saint George is one of the eleven parish of Barbados. It is one of two land-locked parishes, the other being Saint Thomas to the north. Covering an area of approximately 45 km^{2} (17 sq mi), It borders six of the eleven other parishes. Unlike the coastal parishes, Saint George lacks the characteristic beaches and cliffs found along the Barbadian shoreline. The parish features some significant natural formations and key historical sites, including the Gun Hill Signal Station, which dates back to 1818, and one of the six signal stations in Barbados.

=== Populated places ===
The parish contains the following towns, villages, localities, settlements, communities and hamlets:

- Airy Hill
- Applewhaites
- Applewhaites Tenantry
- Ashbury
- Astoria
- Bairds
- Bairds Village
- Belair
- Boarded Hall
- Bournes Village
- Brighton
- Bulkeley
- Bulkeley Close
- Buttals
- Buttals Plantation
- Byde Mill
- Campaign Castle
- Carmichael
- Carmichael Heights
- Carmichael Road
- Charles Rowe Bridge
- Church View
- Constant
- Constant Heights
- Constant Main Road
- Constant New Road
- Constant Plantation
- Constant Road
- Constant Terrace
- Cottage
- Dash Valley
- Drax Hall
- Drax Hall Crescent
- Drax Hall Gardens
- Drax Hall Greens
- Drax Hall Heights
- Drax Hall Hope
- Drax Hall Jump
- Drax Hall Terrace
- Drax Hall Woods
- Eastlyn
- Eastlyn Hill
- Ellerton
- Ellerton Crescent
- Ellerton Gardens
- Ellerton Heights
- Ellerton Terrace
- Ellesmere
- Fair View
- Flat Rock
- Foster Hall
- Francia
- Francia Plantation
- Free Hill
- Frenches
- Golden Ridge
- Good Intent
- Groves
- Groves Corner
- Gun Hill
- Hanson
- Hanson Heights
- Hanson Hill
- Hilbury
- Jordans
- Locust Hall
- Locust Hall Heights
- Lower Brighton
- Lower Burney
- Market Hill
- Mayfield
- Melverton
- Moonshine Hall
- Mount
- Mount Hill
- Newbury
- Old Post Office Road
- Paradise Village
- Parish Land
- Prerogative
- Prospect
- Retreat Wood
- Roach Village
- Rock Hall
- Rowans
- Rowans Hill
- Saint Helens
- Saint Judes
- Saint Judes Village
- Salisbury
- Salters
- South District
- Stepney Village
- Superlative
- Sweet Vale
- Taitt Hill
- The Glebe
- The Valley
- Thorpes Cottage
- Todds
- Todds Village
- Turnpike
- Uplands Factory
- Upper Brighton
- Walkers
- Walkers Heights
- Walkers Terrace
- Watts Village
- Waverley Cot
- Workmans
- Workmans Terrace

=== Parishes bordering Saint George ===
- Christ Church – South
- Saint John – Northeast
- Saint Joseph – North
- Saint Michael – West
- Saint Philip – East
- Saint Thomas – Northwest

== Demographics ==
The parish housed around 21,940 residents as per 2021 population estimate, increasing from 19,767 in 2010. The region has a high human development index. Transportation within Saint George parish primarily relies on its road network.

== Politics ==
Saint George covers two geographical constituencies for the House of Assembly:

- Saint George North
- Saint George South
