= Bairds, Barbados =

Town in Barbados

Coordinates: 13°09′N 59°32′W

Bairds, Saint George, Barbados is a town in the province of Saint George, Barbados. Bairds is surrounded by Four Cross Roads, Welchman Hall, Bathsheba, Oistins and Bridgetown. The Sir Grantley Adams International Airport is about 10km from Bairds. The closest historic site in Barbados is Bridgetown which is also the capital of Barbados.
