= Newbury, Barbados =

Populated place in Barbados

Coordinates: 13°09′N 59°33′W

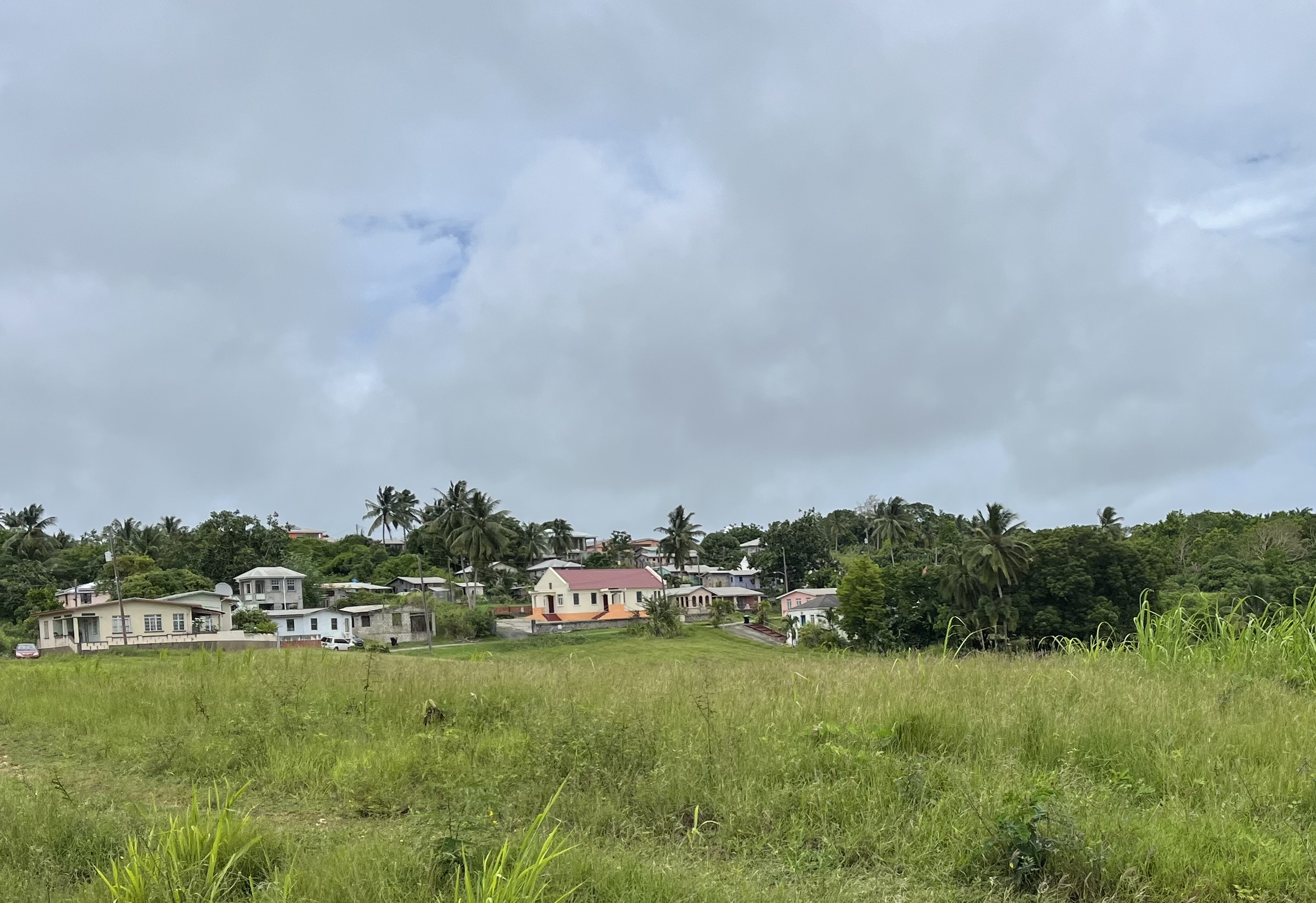
Newbury, Barbados

Newbury previously (Newbir in 1783) is a town located in the parish of Saint George, Barbados. The town is located about 8km North-East of Bridgetown.
