= John Lucie Blackman =

British soldier

John Lucie Blackman (4 October 1793 – 18 June 1815) was a British soldier who fought in the Peninsular War, and is notable for being one of the 47,000 casualties of the Battle of Waterloo, where he died on 18 June 1815, at age 21.

== Early life ==
Blackman was born on 4 October 1793 at Bridewell Hospital Chapel, London. He was the son of George Blackman, who would later change his name to Harnage on his elevation to the peerage and Mary Harnage, daughter of Lieutenant Colonel Henry Harnage. His parents were cousins and Blackman was christened on 30 October 1793 at Bridewell Hospital Chapel, London. He was educated at Westminster school until 1808, whereafter he joined the British Army.

== Military career ==
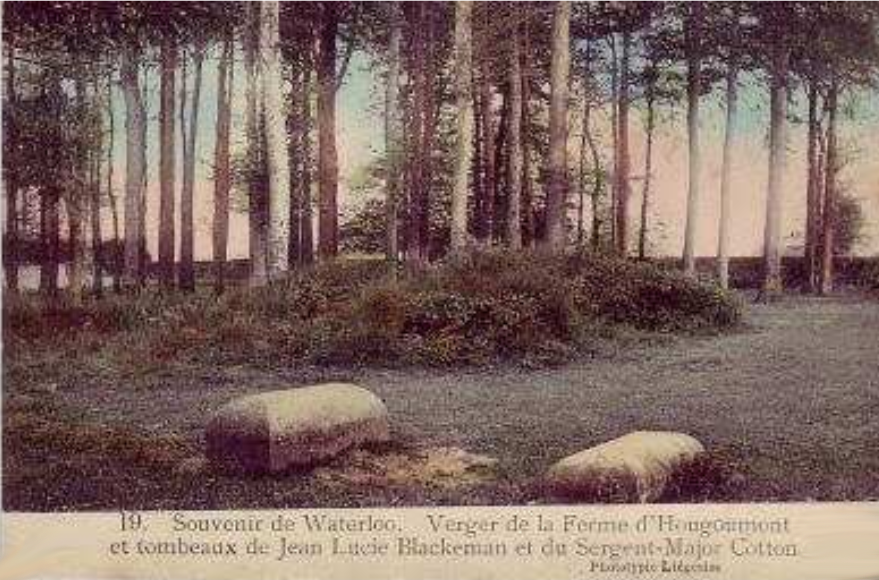
Graves of John Lucie Blackman and Sergeant-Major Edward Cotton at Hougoumont

Having joined the Coldstream Guards as an ensign by purchase on 10 April 1810, he arrived in Spain in early 1812 as part of Sir Arthur Wellesley's army. He fought at the Battle of Salamanca in 1812 and was present at the Siege of Burgos from 19 September to 21 October the same year. He marched into France in 1813, where he took part in the Battle of Vitoria on 21 June 1813 and the subsequent Siege of San Sebastián from July until September.

Blackman was promoted to lieutenant on 22 January 1814 and during the Hundred Days took part in conflicts including the Battle of Quatre Bras on 16 June 1815.

== Death and legacy ==
Blackman spent the day of the Battle of Waterloo defending the Château of Hougoumont against the French. As the last of the enemy fled the field, a musket bull struck him in the temple, killing him instantly.

Although the grounds of Château Hougoumont contain a stone marking Blackman's grave, his remains were moved to the Waterloo monument in Brussels Cemetery in 1889.

Blackman's name is inscribed on one of the panels in the Guards Chapel, Wellington Barracks, London.
