= HMS Deux Amis =

History

France
- Name: Deux Amis
- Namesake: Two friends
- Launched: 1796
- Captured: December 1796

Great Britain
- Name: HMS Deux Amis
- Acquired: By capture December 1796
- Fate: Wrecked 23 May 1799

General characteristics
- Type: Schooner
- Tons burthen: 220 (bm)
- Complement: 80 at capture; 27 in British service
- Armament: 14 guns at capture; 6 × 3-pounder guns in 1798

HMS Deux Amis was the French privateer schooner Deux Amis, launched in 1796. The British captured her in December 1796 and the Royal Navy took her into service under her existing name. She made one capture before wrecking in May 1799.

== Capture, career, and fate ==
In December 1796, Apollo and Polyphemus were off the Irish coast when they captured the 14-gun French privateer schooner Deux Amis, reportedly of "100 tons" bm and 80 men.

Deux Amis arrived at Cork on 1 January 1797 and was registered on 16 March. Master J. Watson commissioned her in February. She underwent fitting at Portsmouth from May to September 1798.

Master Samuel Willson took command in May 1798. In November Deux Amis captured the Spanish snow African Packet. African Packet was carrying silver, which Willson placed in the hands of the firm of Marsh and Creed, London, for onward transfer to the Registry of the High Court of Admiralty.

Deux Amis wrecked on the night of 23–24 May 1799 on the back of the Isle of Wight; her passengers and crew were saved. She was sailing from Jersey to Portsmouth when on the night of the 23rd she struck a sunken rock at Grange Chine. She had as passengers Lieutenants d'Auvergne and Lemprière, and Matthew Gosset, Viscount of Jersey. (Note: Lieutenant d'Auvergne may have been Lieutenant Corbet James d'Auvergne, half-brother to Commodore Philippe d'Auvergne, who commanded a small squadron of Royal Navy vessels stationed at Jersey. Lieutenant Corbet d'Auvergne later in 1799 commanded the hired armed brig Aristocrat operating out of Jersey. Lieutenant Lemprière may have been George Lemprière, who went on to command the schooner Redbridge in 1800.)

Deux Amis left Jersey on 23 May 1799 and at 3:30 in the morning she hit a rock. Despite efforts to save her, water entered the ship faster than the pumps could remove it. After the passengers left in a boat, Willson decided to run her ashore, which he did. As a result, there were no casualties. While Deux Amis was in distress at sea, local fishing boats came to help; once she ran ashore, the local populace gave priority to plundering rather than rescue. When Captain Green of the North Hants militia heard what was happening, he and his officers sent a strong detachment to enforce order.
