= Harnage baronets =

Extinct baronetcy in the Baronetage of the United Kingdom

The Harnage Baronetcy, of Belswardyne in the County of Shropshire, was a title in the Baronetage of the United Kingdom. It was created on 28 July 1821 for George Harnage, a captain in the Royal Navy. Born George Blackman, he was the son of John Lucie Blackman, a London merchant and the member of an old London and West Indies family, and his wife Mary, who after his death married Admiral Edmund Nagle. Mary was the daughter of Sir Henry Harnage, of Belswardyne, Shropshire. In 1821, on his elevation to the peerage, George Blackman assumed the surname of Harnage in lieu of his patronymic so that he could inherit the ancestral Harnage home, Belleswardine House in Shropshire. The Harnages were an old Shropshire family and had been settled at Belswardyne since 1542. The title became extinct on the death of the third Baronet on 13 January 1888, from heart disease.

Escutcheon of the Harnage baronets

== Harnage baronets, of Belswardyne (1821) ==
- George Harnage, 1st Baronet (1767–1836)
- Sir George Harnage, 2nd Baronet (1792–1866)
- Sir Henry George Harnage, 3rd Baronet (1827–1888)

Baronetage of the United Kingdom
Preceded by Phillipps baronets	Harnage baronets of Belswardyne; 28 July 1821	Succeeded by Kerrison baronets
