= William Corden the Elder =

English painter

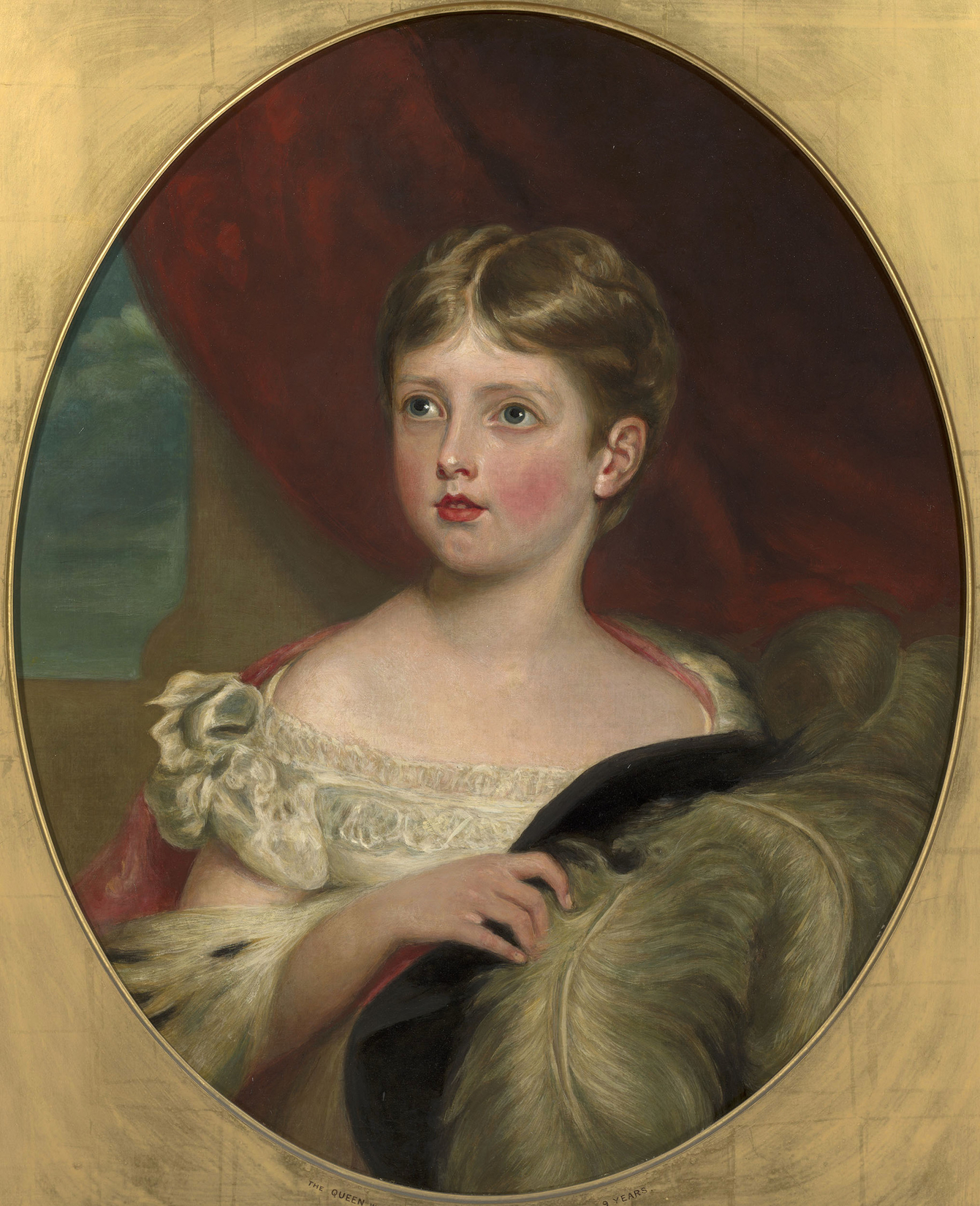
Queen Victoria when Princess by William Corden the Elder

William Corden the Elder (21 January 1795 – 18 June 1867) was an English portrait painter and miniaturist known for his commissions from the Royal Family in the mid nineteenth century.

== Biography ==
William Corden was born in Ashbourne, Derbyshire on 21 January 1795, the son of Robert Corden and his wife Sarah. He was apprenticed at the Royal Crown Derby pottery under Robert Bloor and is reputed to have been among the painters decorating the famous Rockingham Pottery dessert service made for William IV which was first used at Queen Victoria's coronation celebrations. He married Esther Simpson in Derby on 25 September 1816; he rented an artist's studio at 51 Oxford Street, London and exhibited at the Royal Academy. By 1831, William had moved his family to Windsor living first at 17, Brunswick Terrace, New Windsor and then Vine Cottage in Old Windsor. William and Esther had nine children, eight born in Derby and the last in Windsor, including William (1819–1900) known as William Corden the Younger who followed in his father's footsteps as a portrait painter.

William Corden the Elder painted an oil portrait in 1829 of Sir Edmund Nagle (1757–1830) for George IV and a watercolour of Queen Victoria on the East Terrace at Windsor Castle in 1838, one of the earliest paintings of Queen Victoria; both of these paintings are in the Royal Collection. In 1844 William accepted a commission from Prince Albert to travel to Coburg to paint full size reproductions of family portraits there and took his son William with him to assist. There are over 50 paintings by William Corden listed in the Royal Collection but it is not always evident which were painted by the father and which by the son.

Esther died in Windsor in 1855 and William moved back to the midlands. He married Betsy Wood Mannin at Radford, Nottingham in 1859 and they lived at Arkwright Street, Nottingham. William died in Nottingham on 18 June 1867 age 72.
