= George Harnage =

English businessman

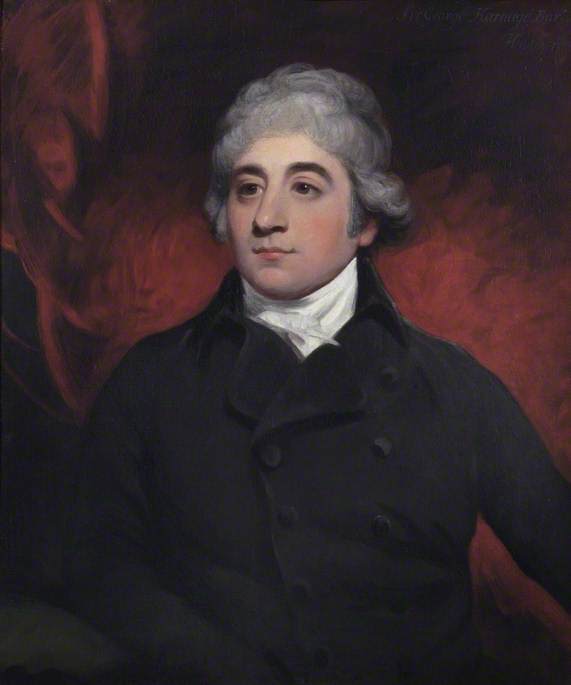
Sir George Harnage portrait by John Hoppner

Sir George Harnage, 1st Baronet (1767–1836) was an English businessman and a director of the Bank of England. He was born George Blackman and changed his name in 1821 so that he could inherit the ancestral home of his wife, Mary (née Harnage).

== Career ==
For many years he was a director of the Bank of England and a West India merchant. Following his bankruptcy on 15 November 1823, his sudden appearance in The London Gazette "was like a thunderbolt to the mercantile world, where his credit had so long stood unimpeached."

His place of business in Chatham Place, Blackfriars, London and his "elegant residence" in Harley Street, which contained one of the first libraries in London, were both sold. He also lost his plantation, Boarded Hall, on Barbados. There is a painting of Harnage by John Hoppner in the Bank of England Museum, London.

== Family ==
Harnage was the son of John Lucie Blackman (d. 1797) a plantation owner in the West Indies and Mary Harnage. Her father, Henry Harnage (1739-1826) of Belswardyne in Shropshire had served as major of the 62nd Foot Regiment, under General John Burgoyne and was severely wounded at the Battle of Freeman's Farm on 19 September 1777 during the American Revolutionary War.

=== Issue ===
His son, John Lucie Blackman, was killed at the Battle of Waterloo on 18 June 1815 while his eldest son George became a commander in the Royal Navy during the Napoleonic Wars and inherited his father's title. The third son, Henry (b. 7 November 1794) took holy orders while a fourth, Edward, was born on 18 October 1798.

== See also ==
- Harnage baronets

Baronetage of the United Kingdom
New creation	Baronet (of Belswardyne); 1821–1836	Succeeded by George Harnage
