= Boarded Hall, Barbados =

Populated place in Barbados

Coordinates: 13°06′29″N 59°32′31″W

Boarded Hall is a small locality in the parish of Christ Church, Barbados. It is located about 6 kilometres (3.7 mi) from the Grantley Adams International Airport.

It takes its name from a sugar plantation owned by the Blackman family. The estate was the ancestral home of Sir George Harnage, 1st Baronet who lost the plantation to bankruptcy in 1823.
