= HMS Révolutionnaire =

Frigate of the Royal Navy

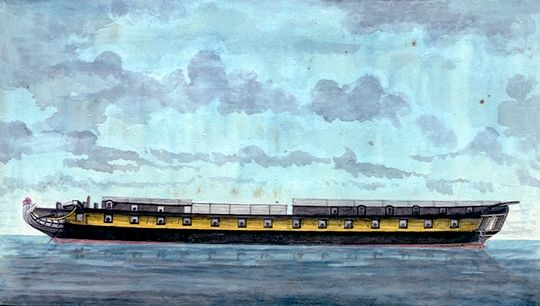
- Hull of HMS Revolutionnaire

History

France
- Name: Révolutionnaire
- Ordered: 3 July 1793
- Builder: Le Havre
- Laid down: October 1793
- Launched: 28 May 1794
- Commissioned: August 1794
- In service: July 1794
- Captured: 22 October 1794

Great Britain
- Name: HMS Révolutionnaire
- Acquired: 22 October 1794
- Honours and awards: Naval General Service Medal with clasps: "23rd June 1795"; "4 Novr. 1805"; "St. Sebastian"
- Fate: Broken up in 1822.

General characteristics
- Displacement: 1311 tonneaux
- Tons burthen: 700 port tonneaux; 114768/94 (bm)
- Length: 157 ft 2 in (47.9 m) (overall); 1,316 ft 9 7/8 in (401.4 m) (keel)
- Beam: 40 ft 5 1/2 in (12.3 m)
- Draught: 5.5 metres
- Depth of hold: 12 ft 6 in (3.8 m)
- Propulsion: Sails
- Sail plan: Full-rigged ship
- Complement: British service: 280 men (later 315).
- Armament: French service: UD: 28 × 18-pounder guns; QD and Fc: 12 × 8-pounder guns + 4 × 42-pounders (presumably carronades); British service: UD: 28 × 18-pounder guns; QD: 8 × 9-pounder guns + 6 × 32-pounder carronades; Fc: 2 × 9-pounder guns + 2 × 32-pounder carrondes; Between 1803 and 1812 32-pounder carronades replaced the 18-pounder guns on the Upper deck.

Révolutionnaire (or Revolutionaire), was a 40-gun Seine-class frigate of the French Navy, launched in May 1794. The British captured her in October 1794 and she went on to serve with the Royal Navy until she was broken up in 1822. During this service Revolutionnaire took part in numerous actions, including three for which the Admiralty would in 1847 award clasps to the Naval General Service Medal, and captured several privateers and merchant vessels.

== French service ==
On 21 October 1794 the 38-gun frigate Artois captured Révolutionnaire. Artois was part of a four-frigate squadron that encountered Revolutionnaire at daybreak about eight to ten leagues west of Ushant. She had been out of Le Havre eight days on her first cruise and was sailing to Brest. Artois outpaced the rest of the squadron and engaged Revolutionnaire, which surrendered after 40 minutes as the rest of the British squadron approached. The British had three men killed and five wounded. The French lost eight men killed and five wounded, including the captain, Citizen Antoine René Thévenard. (Note: Henderson reports that the crew forced the surrender against the wished of Révolutionnaire's officers and attributes this to the French Navy not yet having returned to pre-Revolutionary discipline.) Artois shared the prize money with the other frigates, Arethusa, Diamond, and Galatea. (Note: The preliminary payment was £10,000, yielding each of the captains some £312.)

== British service: French Revolutionary Wars ==
The Royal Navy commissioned Revolutionnaire in April 1795 under Captain Francis Cole. On 23 June Revolutionnaire participated in the Battle of Groix. After the battle, she towed Alexander, which the French had captured the previous November and which the British had just recaptured, back to Plymouth. In 1847 the Admiralty issued the Naval General Service Medal with clasp "23 June 1795" to all surviving claimants from the action.

In 1796 Revolutionaire was in the squadron commanded by Captain Sir Edward Pellew in Indefatigable. The squadron captured or sank a number of merchant vessels between 11 and 21 March.

- Favorite Sultana, laden with salt—captured;
- Friends, brig, laden with flour—captured;
- Brig of unknown name, in ballast—sunk;
- Chasse maree of unknown name, empty—sunk;
- Providence, chasse maree, laden with wine and brandy—captured;
- Brig of unknown name, laden with empty casks—sunk;
- Four Marys, brig, in Ballast—captured;
- Aimable Justine, brig, in ballast—captured;
- Nouvelle Union, brig, in ballast—captured.

The vessels sharing in the prize money were: Indefatigable, Concorde, Revolutionaire, Amazon, Argo, and the hired armed luggers Dolly and Duke of York.

On 12 April 1796 Revolutionaire captured the French frigate Unité. Unité, under the command of Citizen Charles-Alexandre Léon Durand Linois, struck after Revolutionnaire's second broadside. Revolutionnaire had no casualties because the French had fired high, aiming for her rigging; the British fired into their quarry with the result that Unité suffered nine men killed and 11 wounded. (Note: Henderson reports that in this case too the crew forced the surrender against the wished of her officers.) Among the prisoners were the wife of Admiral Jean-Amable Lelarge, as well as one of his sons, who served as an officer on Unité. Pellew had them released on parole and ordered the captured ship to be commanded to England by Edward Ellicott, first lieutenant of the Revolutionnaire, who was cited by Captain Cole "for his very particular attention in keeping sight of the chase, and for his steady and manly conduct when close engaged." In July there was an initial distribution of prize money for the capture of Unité and Virginie (captured by Indefatigable) of £20,000. Revolutionnaire and Indefatigable shared this with Amazon, Concorde and Argo. The Royal Navy took Unité into service under her existing name. (Note: The initial distribution probably yielded each of the five British captains £1000.)

On 1 October 1796, Revolutionnaire, Indefatigable, Amazon, and Phoebe shared in the capture of Vrow Delenea Maria.

Later that month, after the Battle of Tory Island, the French frigates Loire and Sémillante escaped into Black Sod Bay, where they hoped to hide until they had a clear passage back to France. However, late on 15 October, a British frigate squadron under James Newman Newman rounded the southern headland of the bay, forcing the French ships to flee to the north. Pressing on sail in pursuit, Newman ordered Revolutionaire to focus on Sémillante whilst he pursued Loire in Mermaid, accompanied by the brig Kangaroo under Commander Edward Brace. Loire and Sémillante separated to divide their pursuers; Mermaid and Kangaroo lost track of Loire in the early evening, and Sémillante evaded Revolutionaire after dark. Mermaid and Kangaroo eventually found Loire but after an inconclusive fight that left the British unable to pursue, Loire broke off the engagement and escaped.

Captain Cole died on 18 April 1798. His replacement was Captain Thomas Twysden.

Revolutionnaire shared with Boadicea, Pique and the hired armed cutter Nimrod in the capture of Anna Christiana on 17 May 1798.

On 30 May 1799 Revolutionnaire captured the French privateer Victoire after an eight-hour chase that lasted into the evening. Victoire was armed with sixteen 9-pounder guns and had a crew of 160 men. She was nine days out of Bayonne on a three-month cruise but had captured nothing. (Note: Victoire was a 300-ton ("of load") privateer brig from Bayonne commissioned in 1799. She cruised under a Captain Damborgez, or Dambouyer, with 12 officers and 100 to 103 men, with 18 guns. On her preceding cruise, she had captured the British privateer Lord Hawke.)

Revolutionnaire was in company with Dryad and Diamond when Revolutionaire captured the French letter of marque brig Hyppolite on 29 May. She was sailing from Cayenne to Nantes.

On 7 July 1799, the same three British ships also captured the French privateer Determiné. Determiné was pierced for 24 guns and was armed with 18 brass 12- and 9-pounder guns. She had a crew of 163 men when she was captured. Then on 19 September, Revolutionnaire and Dryad captured Cères, another French letter of marque, en route from Bordeaux to the Caribbean.

On 11 October Revolutionnaire chased a strange sail in a heavy gale for nine and a half hours over a distance of 114 miles (i.e., a rate of 12 miles per hour). (Note: Rouvier gives a date of 1 October.) When captured, the quarry turned out to be Bordelais (or Bourdelaise), of Bordeaux. She was pierced for 26 guns but carried sixteen 12-pounder guns and eight 36-pounder carronades. She had a crew of 202 men. She had been cruising from Passage for 19 days during which time she had captured two vessels, an American ship carrying a cargo of tobacco, and a Portuguese ship sailing from Cork with provisions. Twysden, in an attempt to interest the Admiralty in purchasing her, described Bordelais as "a most beautiful new Ship, well calculated for His Majesty's Service; was the largest, and esteemed the fastest sailing Privateer out of France." (Note: It is common in accounts of captures for the captor to describe his prize as a remarkably fast sailer, which raises the question of how it is that the captor captured his quarry. In this case it seems that Revolutionnaire and Bordelais were both among the fastest ships afloat, with other sources citing an even faster average speed around 14.3 miles per hour for a chase of 129 miles over nine hours; it is also claimed that they had the same builder, who had stated at a dinner celebrating Bordelais's first privateering voyage, that only Revolutionnaire could catch her.) The Admiralty took her into service as HMS Bordelais. Four hundred French prisoners from Aréthuse and Bourdelaise landed at Plymouth on 24 November.

On 4 March 1800 Revolutionnaire captured the French privateer ship Coureur. Coureur was armed with ten 6-pounder guns and four carronades. She had a crew of 158 men. On 28 February she had captured "His Majesty's Ship Princess Royal", which had been sailing for Tortola. (Note: It is not clear what ship Princess Royal was, as the only Royal Navy vessel by that name was Princess Royal, a 98-gun ship of the line. There was, however, a British letter of marque by that name that is a candidate.) Twysden was pleased to discover that her captain and most of her crew were prisoners aboard the privateer. Coureur was new, copper-bottomed and on her first cruise. Apparently, she also sailed "delightfully". The Royal Navy took her into service as Trompeuse, there already being a Coureur in service and Trompeuse having been lost in May, shortly after the capture of Coureur.

On 19 April 1800, Revolutionnaire and Dryad arrived in Milford Haven in a distressed state. Dryad had been on a cruise out of Cork and was on her way home when on 2 April, with her rigging much damaged by hurricanes, when she had encountered Revolutionnaire, which had lost her rudder. Dryad escorted Revolutionnaire to Cork, but when they were no more than an hour out of the port, the winds blew them towards Plymouth. On 16 April they were close to the rocks at Waterford when Dryad succeeded in getting a cable on to Revolutionnaire. Unfortunately, the cable broke and Dryad pulled away, expecting Revolutionnaire to wreck on the rocks. However, providentially, the wind shifted and pushed her away from shore. On 19 April both vessels succeeded in safely reaching Milford Haven.

On 16 February 1801, Revolutionnaire captured the French privateer Moucheron, of Bordeaux. Moucheron was armed with sixteen 6 and 12-pounder guns, and had a crew of 130 men. She was 20 days out of Passage and had capture the British brig William, of London, which had been sailing from St. Michael's with a cargo of fruit. The Royal Navy took her into service as Moucheron.

In May Lloyd's List reported that the French privateer Braave had captured Nimble, Nuttell, master, as she was sailing from Demerara to Liverpool. HMS Révolutionnaire recaptured Nimble and Marina, another vessel that Braave had also taken.

In October 1801 Revolutionnaire was under the temporary command of Commander Murray. In May 1802, shortly after the Peace of Amiens, Thomas Bladen Capel was appointed captain of Révolutionnaire. He sailed her from Spithead to the Mediterranean where he joined Phoebe as her captain.

== British service: Napoleonic Wars ==
Revolutionnaire was recommissioned in April 1803 under the command of Captain Walter Lock. On 20 May 1803, Revolutionnaire captured the French dogger Grand Adrian (or Grand Adrien). Two days later Revolutionnaire and Nemesis captured Alexander. The next day Revolutionnaire captured Windboud.

Lock then sailed Revolutionnaire to Gibraltar on 5 June. Eight days later, Revolutionnaire captured the French merchant vessel Hirondelle. (Note: The advance payment of prize money was £860. A second advance was £6944. As captain, Lock would have received one-quarter of the money, or £1951, or somewhere between four and eight years' salary. The able and ordinary seamen, landsmen and boys would have shared a quarter also, though not equally.) In August, Captain Robert Hall took command for the Channel. On 16 October 1803, Revolutionnaire captured the French sloop Sophia, of eight men. Then on 1 December Revolutionnaire captured the French schooners Ceres, and her crew of 76 men, and Marian, in ballast. As the size of her crew makes clear, Ceres was a privateer. Two days later Revolutionnaire recaptured the American brig Tartar. In December, Revolutionnaire returned to Britain from the West Indies.

In April 1804 Revolutionnaire was recommissioned under Captain the Honourable Henry Hotham. By November she was off the coast of the United States and stopped in at Norfolk, Virginia. Then she sailed up to New York where she picked up $750,000 in gold to take back to Britain. Hotham would have received a commission of about 1% of the value for carrying the money. In January 1805, she was driven ashore on Long Island, New York, United States.

On 1 and 4 July 1805, vessels in a squadron captured Harmony and Rachael. Revolutionnaire was one of the 39 vessels that shared in the prize money. (Note: So many vessels shared that when the prize money was paid some ten years later, a captain's share was £6 11s. A seaman's share was 3d.)

On 4 November 1805, Revolutionnaire, participated in the Battle of Cape Ortegal. She and Phoenix captured Scipion, which the Royal Navy commissioned as HMS Scipion. In the battle, Revolutionnaire lost two men killed and six wounded. Revolutionnaire shared in the prize money for Formidable, Duguay Trouin and Mont Blanc, as well as Scipion. In 1847 the Admiralty awarded the Naval General Service Medal with clasp "4 Novr. 1805" to all surviving claimants form the battle.

In February 1806 Captain Charles Fielding took command as Revolutionnaire served in the Channel.

Revolutionnaire shared with Hero, Iris, and Confiance in the proceeds from the recapture on 11 January 1807 of the schooner Monarch. On 25 September she shared with Pomone in the capture of the Danish ship Resolution.

Then between October 1811 and December 1812 she underwent a major overhaul at Plymouth. She was recommissioned in October 1812 under Captain John Woolcombe (or Woollcombe). At some point Revolutionnaire sailed to North America.

Revolutionnaire recaptured Ajax, M'Kay, master, and sent her into Plymouth, where she arrived on 12 May 2013. Ajax had been sailing from Aberdeen to St Croix when the American privateer General Tompkins, of fourteen 18-pounder guns and 109 men, had captured her on 31 March.

On 25 July 1813, Revolutionnaire captured the American privateer schooner Matilda, of 190 tons. She was pierced for 18 guns but carried 11. Lion had captured Matilda in a severe action off the coast of Brazil, but the American privateer Argus, or by other accounts, the USS Argus had recaptured her. Matilda reached Plymouth on 29 July.

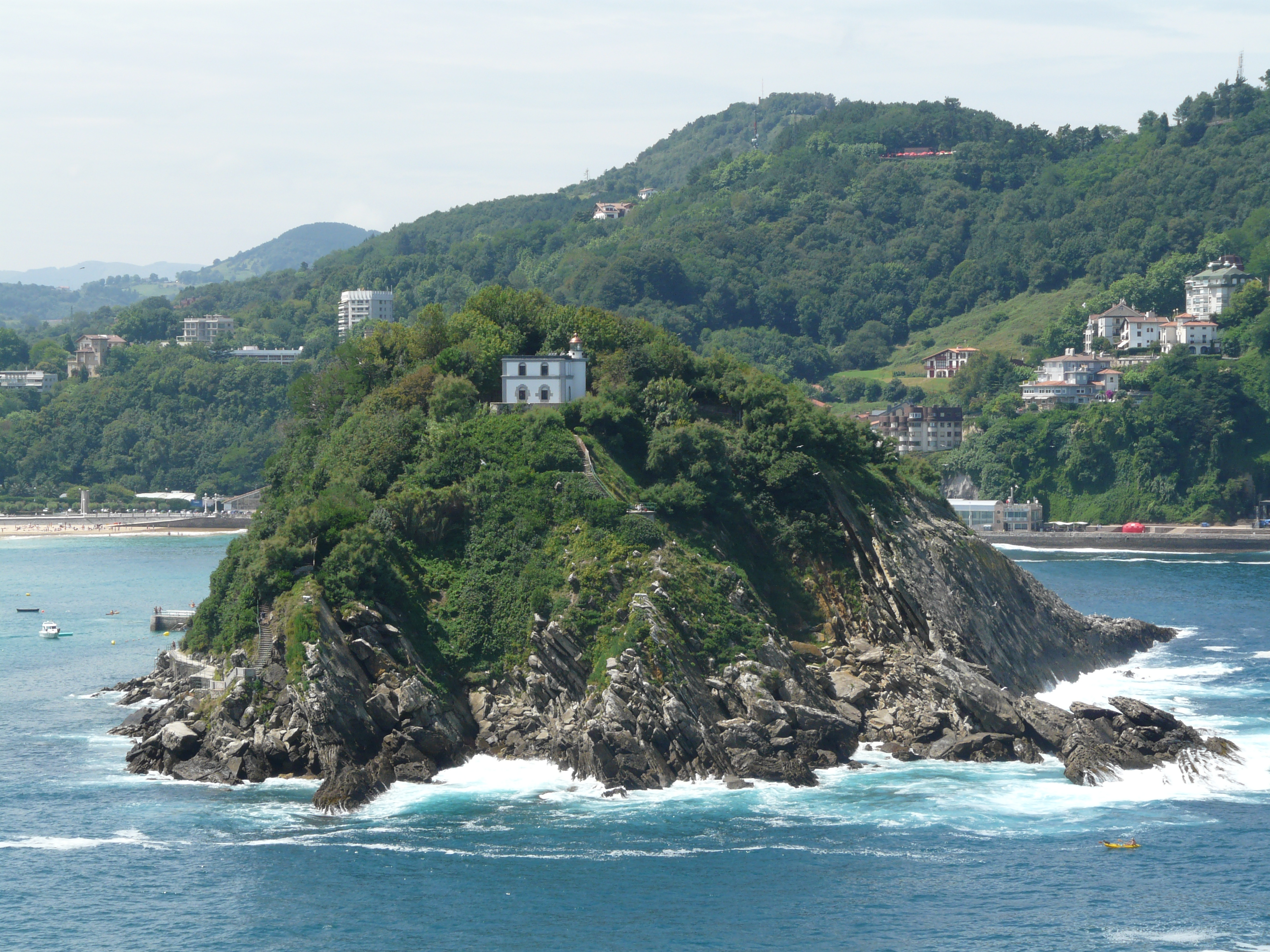
Santa Clara Island, San Sebastian

Already by August 1813, Revolutionnaire was part of a squadron under the command of Captain Sir George Collier. On 27 August the boats of the squadron made a successful attack on the island of Santa Clara, at the mouth of the harbour of Saint Sebastian. Revolutionnaire suffered no casualties. She then provided seamen to man a battery of 24-pounder guns from Surveillante hauled up to the top of the island. The battery then silenced the enemy's guns. In 1847 the Admiralty awarded the Naval General Service Medal with clasp "St. Sebastian" to all claimants from Collier's naval operations in the region in August and September.

On 20 October Revolutionnaire captured Fire Fly. Then on 5 November Revolutionnaire recaptured the Gaditana.

On the last day of 1813, Revolutionnaire sailed with a convoy for the East Indies. She and Zebra were in Simon's Bay on 28 July 1816 where they were stranded and almost destroyed by a terrible hurricane. On 6 October she reached St. Helena and on 13 October she sailed for Britain.

== Post-war and fate ==
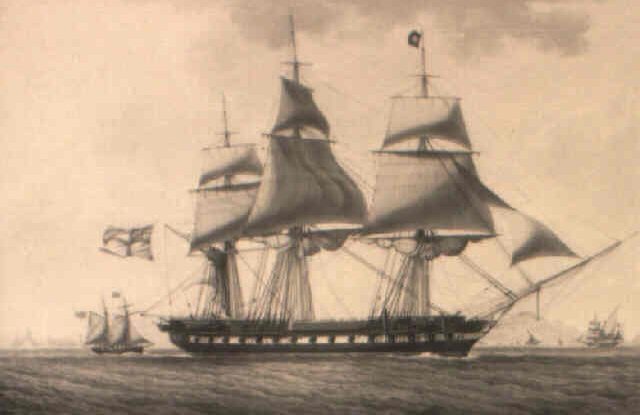
Portrait of Révolutionnaire in 1820, by Antoine Roux.

In early 1817 Revolutionnaire underwent repairs at Plymouth. She was then fitted for sea between August 1818 and January 1819. She was commissioned under Captain Fleetwood Pellew Revolutionnaire in August 1818 for the Mediterranean. (Note: In 1794 Fleetwood Pellew had brought back to England, in Revolutionnaire, the official letter by his father, Edward Pellew, announcing the details of her capture.)

At midnight or so on 16 December Vengeur, which was carrying the king of Naples, was under full sail when she ran into the side of Revolutionnaire. Fortunately the impact was oblique, not perpendicular, or Revolutionnaire would have been sunk. As it was, both vessels were badly damaged and had to put into the Bay of Baia for repairs.

On 18 May 1821 Revolutionnaire captured two piratical gun-boats, with bounty money for the crews being paid in 1834. Pellew remained in command until 1822.

Revolutionnaire was briefly under the command of Captain Henry Duncan, but was broken up on 4 October 1822.

== Miscellany ==
- The English composer William Beale served as a midshipman between 1799 and 1801, before deciding instead to pursue music as a career. Apparently, while a midshipman, he almost drowned in Cork harbour.
- In 1821 Arthur Fleming Morrell, British naval officer and later explorer and colonial administrator of Ascension Island, was first lieutenant aboard Revolutionnaire under Captain the Hon. Fleetwood Pellew.

== Gallery ==
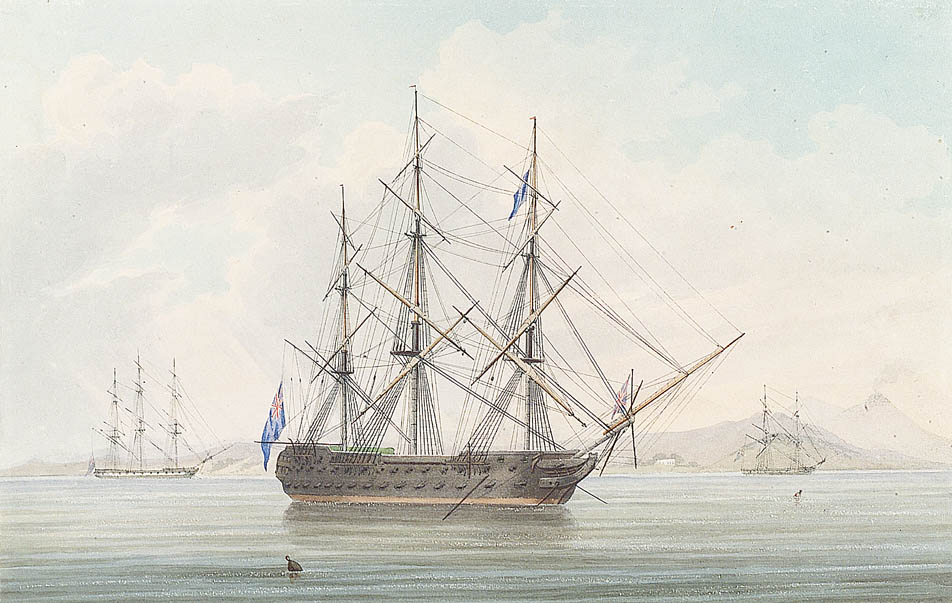
Left to right: HMS Revolutionnaire, HMS Rochefort and HMS Race Horse during the internment of Sir Thomas Freemantle on 22 December 1819, at Baia Bay, Naples
