= Alexis Grassin =

French privateer

Alexis Grassin (Nantes, 1 April 1776 – 24 June 1823) was a highly successful French privateer, who operated during the French Revolutionary and Napoleonic Wars.

== Career ==
Born to Michel-Antoine Grassin, a naval surgeon, and Anne Denis, Alexis Grassin captained the privateer Général Ernouf, a 14-gun brig with 115 men. In early 1806, Grassin captured Clio after an action of half an hour; Clio had escaped French naval cruisers shortly before she ran into Général Ernouf Between 1 July 1806 and 30 September 1807, he captured the merchantmen Elisabeth, Tabago, Adventure, Culmore, Mermaid, Swallow, and Argus, for a total value of 663 000 francs. Furthermore, on 14 September 1807, he captured the schooner HMS Barbara. He was made a Knight of the Legion of Honour, in recognition of the deed.

In September he made a brief cruise on the privateer Revanche before returning to Général Ernouf.

On 17 October 1807, Grassin captured the British slave ship Elizabeth, a brig of fourteen 6-pounder guns, a crew of 24 men, and a cargo of 176 "Negroes" (slaves).

Grassin then transferred to Diligent, a 6-gun brig of 185 tons.> On 11 September 1808, he captured the American merchantman Brutus, Edwards, master, of and for New York; the capture was contested, as Brutus had departed in June 1807 to retrieve British goods at Madras, which was legal according to a decree of 21 November 1806, and had only become illegal since 17 December 1807; however, an Imperial decree validated the capture.

On 16 June 1809, Grassin departed Guadeloupe on Dame Ernouf, arriving at Lorient on 28 July. Dame Ernouf was armed en guerre but laden with sugar, cotton, and coffee, and furthermore ferried Geneviève Miloent, wife of Jean Augustin Ernouf, governor of Guadeloupe, along with her handmaid and three slaves. During the voyage, he captured the Spanish schooner Antilope, the American brig Hanna and ship Joseph, and the British ships Swift and Diana.

In August 1809, Dame Ernouf was decommissioned in Nantes, only to be recommissioned under the name Diligent. On Diligent, Grassin captured six ships by July 1811. On 23 August 1812, he captured the British schooner HMS Whiting, and on 8 September 1812, the 10-gun brig HMS Laura. In late December, Diligent arrived in Saint-Nazaire from Philadelphia, laden with despatches from the French ambassador to the USA.

Grassin retired at the Bourbon Restoration. He had married Catherine Daguzeau.
