= Dame Ernouf (1807 privateer) =

History

France
- Name: Dame Ernouf
- Namesake: Geneviève Miloent, wife of Jean Augustin Ernouf, governor of Guadeloupe
- Renamed: Diligent (1810)

General characteristics
- Complement: Dame Ernouf:130; Diligent:97-120
- Armament: Dame Ernouf:10 guns, later 6 to increase her speed; Diligent:2 × 12-pounder guns + 16 × 24-pounder carronades

Dame Ernouf first appears under that name in 1807. Her origins are currently obscure. She served as a privateer first under that name, and then under the name Diligent. As Diligent she not only capture several merchantmen but also two British Royal Navy vessels: a schooner and a brig. She continued to capture prizes until the end of 1813 and then disappears from online records.

== Origins ==
By one source Dame Ernouf was the privateer brig Barbara, of 185 tons (bm), that the French privateer General Ernouf had captured on 15 September 1807 and had taken into Guadeloupe. However, the vessel that General Ernouf captured was the British Royal Navy schooner HMS Barbara, an Adonis class schooner of 110 tons (bm), that her captor took into Cayenne. She became the French privateer Pératy, which the Royal Navy recaptured her in 1808.

== Dame Ernouf ==
Dame Ernouf was commissioned in Guadeloupe in late 1807 under Alexis Grassin who had earlier captained Général Ernouf. Under Grassin she was based in Lorient and later in Nantes, from August 1808 to July 1809.

On 11 September 1808, Dame Ernouf captured Brutus, of and for New York, Edwards, master. Brutus was returning from Bengal when she was captured. Her captors sent her into Cayenne where she arrived on 5 October; Brutus was condemned there. (Note: A week after HMS Reindeer, Franchise, Aurora, Daedalus, and Pert captured the town and port of Samana, on 18 November they captured two French 5-gun privateer schooners. One was Guerrière, Louis Telin, master, with a crew of 110 men; the other was Exchange with a crew of 104. The British also took three merchant vessels: the schooner Diana and a brig, both laden with fish, and the sloop Brutus, laden with coffee.) Dame Ernouf was recommissioned in Nantes in April 1809.

On 17 June Dame Ernouf left Guadeloupe, carrying Madame Ernouf back to France for her health. Dame Ernouf arrived at Lorient on 28 July. On this voyage she captured several British merchant vessels: schooner Antelope and brig Hanna, and the ships Joseph, Swifise [sic], and Diana. Lloyd's List describes Antelope as a Spanish schooner that Dame Ernouf, of six guns, captured on 17 June as Antelope was sailing from St Thomas's to Martinique.

A report from Paris dated 1 March 1810 stated that Dame Ernouf had recently arrived at Bordeaux with three prizes, a ship carrying sugar, coffee, and indigo, a brig with cotton, and a ship with oil and cod.

On 24 July 1810 Dame Ernouf captured two Spanish vessels, one sailing in ballast from London to Caracas, and the other carrying ironmongery from Bristol to Cadiz. Dame Ernouf sank the first and sent the second into Brest.

The next day the West Indiaman Starling, Coulson, master, was returning to London from Martinique and St Lucia when she encountered Dame Ernouf, of 18 guns and 130 men, nine days into a cruise from Brest. Dame Ernouf captured Starling, but three days later, on 28 July, HMS Seine recaptured Starling off Brest.

Dame Ernouf was decommissioned in Nantes; she was soon recommissioned as a privateer under the name Diligent.

== Diligent ==
Diligent made several successful cruises under Grassin. From June 1811 to December 1812, Diligent operated from Nantes under Alexis Grassin

On Diligent, Grassin had captured six ships by July 1811. On 23 August 1812, he captured the schooner HMS Whiting, and on 8 September the 10-gun brig HMS Laura.

In late December, Diligent arrived in Saint-Nazaire from Philadelphia, laden with despatches from the French ambassador to the USA.

Diligent was last mentioned in French records as being at Saint-Nazaire in December 1812. However, on 24 December 1813 Lloyd's List reported that Derwent had recaptured Racehorse, which the French privateer Diligent, of 14 guns and 120 men, had captured. Racehorse had been sailing from Newfoundland to Teignmouth when captured. (Note: Racehorse, of 123 tons (bm), had been launched at Teignmouth in 1802.)

The same report stated that Diligent had captured seven other vessels, and then had captured the Portuguese brig Rio de Mandego as the brig was sailing from Liverpool to Cape Verde. Diligent put the crews from the vessels she had captured on board Rio de Mandego, which arrived at Plymouth on 21 December.
