= Dame Ernouf =

At least three French privateers during the Napoleonic Wars were named Dame Ernouf, for Geneviève Miloent, wife of Jean Augustin Ernouf, governor of Guadeloupe:

- Dame Ernouf (1805–1805), was a 200-ton brig with a crew of about 100 men and armed with sixteen 6-pounder guns. She was under Captain Vilac. HMS Curieux captured her on 8 February 1805 and the Royal Navy took her into service as HMS Seaforth. Seaforth foundered later that year.
- Dame Ernouf (1806–1806), was a privateer of 150 men and 17 guns. HMS Heureux captured her on 30 March 1806.
- Dame Ernouf (1807 privateer) became the privateer Diligent and was last mentioned in December 1813

== See also ==
- Général Ernouf (ship)
