= Adventure (1802 ship) =

UK slave ship 1802–1804

History

United Kingdom
- Name: Adventure
- Owner: 1802:Charles Watt & Thomas Edwards; 1806:Samuel Newton, Thomas Hayes, & Thomas Graham
- Builder: Liverpool
- Launched: 1802
- Captured: 1806

General characteristics
- Tons burthen: 105, or 135 (bm)
- Sail plan: Schooner
- Complement: 1803:30; 1804:20
- Armament: 1803:10 × 4-pounder guns + 2 × 9-pounder carronades; 1804:10 × 4-pounder guns
- Notes: Two decks and three masts

Adventure was launched at Liverpool in 1802. She made three voyages as a slave ship in the triangular trade in enslaved people. A French privateer captured her in 1806 on her fourth voyage.

== Career ==
Adventure first appeared in Lloyd's Register (LR) in 1803 with C. Watts, master, Watts &co., owner, and trade Liverpool–Africa.

1st enslaving voyage (1803): Captain Charles Watt sailed from Liverpool on 11 January 1803, bound for West Central Africa and St Helena. Adventure arrived at St Thomas, in the Danish West Indies on 9 July, where she landed 136 slaves. She sailed from there on 1 August and arrived back at Liverpool on 26 September. She had left with 16 crew members and suffered four deaths on her voyage.

2nd enslaving voyage (1803–1804): Captain Charles Watt acquired a letter of marque on 11 November 1803. Adventure sailed from Liverpool on 9 December 1803 and arrived at St Thomas on 14 June, where she landed 131 slaves. She sailed from there on 24 July and arrived back at Liverpool on 15 September. She had left with 29 crew members and suffered three deaths on her voyage.

3rd enslaving voyage (1804–1806): Captain Joseph Tyack acquired a letter of marque on 10 October 1804. Adventure sailed from Liverpool 27 November 1804. she gathered her slaves at the Congo River and took them to Suriname where she landed 136 slaves. She sailed on 1 December and arrived back at Liverpool on 13 February 1806. She had left Liverpool with 20 crew members and suffered six crew deaths on her voyage.

4th enslaving voyage (1806–loss): Captain John Brown sailed from Liverpool on 28 July 1806. Adventure acquired captives, and sailed for the West Indies.

== Fate ==
The French captured her before she could land her captives. A French privateer captured her on 24 December windward of Barbados, and sent her into Guadeloupe. It is estimated that she landed 160 slaves. She had left Liverpool with a crew of 21 men.

Adventure's captor was the privateer Général Ernouf, under the command of Alexis Grassin. She and her cargo were sold for 228,199 francs.

In 1806, 33 British enslaving ships were lost. Of these, 11 were lost in the Middle Passage, sailing from Africa to the West Indies. During the period 1793 to 1807, war, rather than maritime hazards or resistance by the captives, was the greatest cause of vessel losses among British slave vessels.
