= Britannia (1802 ship) =

UK merchant ship (1802–1806)

History

United Kingdom
- Name: Britannia
- Namesake: Britannia
- Owner: Fletcher & Co.; 1805:Poole & Co.; 1806:France and Co.
- Launched: 1802
- Fate: Destroyed by explosion 11 February 1806

General characteristics
- Tons burthen: 455, or 460, or 465(bm)
- Propulsion: Sails
- Complement: 35
- Armament: 20 × 9-pounder guns

Britannia was a merchant vessel launched at Kingston-upon-Hull in 1802. She repelled the attack of a French privateer in a notable single-ship action in 1804. An accidental explosion in Cork harbour in 1806 destroyed her and killed most of her crew.

== Career ==
Britannia entered Lloyd's Register in 1803 with master M. Leavy, owner Fletcher, and trade Liverpool-Jamaica.

Captain Matthew Leavy received a letter of marque on 2 June 1803.

Single-ship action: Britannia was on her way to Jamaica from Madeira when on 1 July 1804 she encountered Général Ernouf, which did not engage. Four days later the two again sighted each other, and again the French vessel did not engage. However, one month later, on 5 August, Général Ernouf encountered Britannia about 200 miles west of Antigua.

This time, sensing an easy capture as her quarry appeared unready, General Ernouf came alongside and attempted to board. The two vessels exchanged both cannon and small arms fire, with Britannia twice repulsing boarding attempts. After the engagement left both vessels with severely damaged masts and rigging, Général Ernouf withdrew, with Britannia in pursuit; however, Britannia lost her attacker in the dark after night fell. Britannia had one man killed (a passenger who had volunteered his services), and four wounded, Leavy among them.

In his description of the engagement, Leavy mentioned that the desertion of four men at Madeira and the illness of two had left him short-handed and unable fully to man his guns. He later found out that General Ernouf, out of Basse-Terre, was armed with four 24-pounder guns and twelve 18-pounder carronades, and had a crew of 170-180 men.

In 1805, Britannia changed owners and her trade appeared as Liverpool-Madeira.

In 1806, Britannia's ownership changed again, and her trade became Liverpool-Jamaica.

Loss: on 11 February 1806 Britannia exploded in the Cove at Cork. No nearby ships suffered any damage, but on Britannia 12 people died; one of the people killed was a woman passenger. Two crew members and the ship's papers were saved. Captain Leavy was on shore at the time. The Register of Shipping (2006) had the notation "LOST" against her name.

A crew member caused the explosion by carrying a candle while retrieving powder from the ship's magazine. The explosion destroyed Britannia's aft, sinking her in the man-of-war roads. The government of the day moved her to a location where she would not impede larger vessels, but her wreckage continued to be a hazard to smaller vessels, especially as a sand bar formed around her. In 1889 the Harbour Department contracted for her complete removal. The contractor found two guns, part of her cargo, including machinery, and ingots of pig iron that made up her ballast.
