= Hired armed cutter Duke of York =

History

United Kingdom
- Name: Duke of York
- Commissioned: 23 June 1803
- Decommissioned: 24 September 1810

General characteristics
- Type: Cutter
- Tons burthen: 8227/94 (bm)
- Armament: 8 × 4-pounder guns

His Majesty's hired armed cutter Duke of York served the British Royal Navy from 23 June 1803 to 24 September 1810.

== Career ==
In July 1803 she sent into Portsmouth the American vessel Eagle, from New York bound for Amsterdam, and Galatea, which had been sailing from Bordeaux to Bremen. In August she sent in Young Jane, from Roxburgh for France. The next month Duke of York sent Syren, Desrege, master, into Falmouth. Syren had been sailing from Barcelona to Guernsey.

In October 1804, Duke of York brought into Cowes 200 casks of spirits that she had retrieved off the Needles.

In 1807 Duke of York was under the command of Lieutenant A. Mott. On 15 October, under the command of Lieutenant J. Forbes and while in company with the revenue cutters Fox and Seagull, she captured the French privateer Friedland. (Prize money was due to be paid in 1809.)

In March 1810 she sent Hanna, Bantzen, master, sailing from Trequeir, into Weymouth.

In May Lieutenant Alexander Francis Elphinstone replaced Lieutenant Richard Bankes in command of Duke of York. Bankes transferred to take command of the gun-brig HMS Forward on the Leith station. (Note: Elphinstone had been serving in the Russian Navy when war broke out between England and Russia. He had resigned from the Russian Navy and had been court-martialed and sentenced to die. He had escaped and had made his way back to England.) (Note: Ships, their Captains, their Stations, and year built: 778.Forward (GBg).14[guns].Richard Bankes.Spithead.1805)

Steel's Navy List reported that Duke of York in 1811 was under the command of Lieutenant T. Banks in Guernsey. This is after she was reported returned to her owners, but another source still has her listed as under commission under Lieutenant T Banks as late as 1813-14 on page 187, yet Lieutenant R Bankes appears on page 181 with HMS Forward.
