= French ship Éole (1799) =

French ship (1799-1820)

History

France
- Name: Éole
- Namesake: Aeolus
- Builder: Bordeaux
- Commissioned: As a privateer in 1797
- Recommissioned: In the French Navy September 1799
- Fate: Captured 1799

Great Britain
- Name: HMS Nimrod
- Acquired: 1799 by capture
- Fate: Sold 1811

United Kingdom
- Name: Nimrod
- Owner: John Soady Rains
- Acquired: 1811 by purchase
- Fate: Last listed in Lloyd's Register in 1820.

General characteristics
- Displacement: 300 (tons; French)
- Tons burthen: 341, 342, 345, or 395, or 398 by calc. (Note: Winfield reports that the British Admiralty's dimensions and burthen for Nimrod are identical with those for Galgo. Galgo also was captured in 1799 and the information for her may have been accidentally copied to Nimrod.) (bm)
- Length: 30.9 m (101 ft)
- Beam: 8.85 m (29 ft 0 in)
- Complement: French service:125; HMS: Originally:86; 1804:121; Whaler:36
- Armament: French service; French records:16 guns; British records:16 × 8-pounder guns + 2 × 36-pounder Obusier de vaisseau; HMS: Originally:16 × 18-pounder carronades + 2 × 6-pounder chase guns; 1804:16 × 24-pounder carronades + 2 × 6-pounder chase guns; Whaler: 1812: 14 ×12-pounder guns; 1814:12 ×12-pounder guns
- Armour: Timber

Éole was an 18-gun corvette of the French Navy, launched, captured, and later commissioned in the Royal Navy in 1799 as HMS Nimrod after her capture by HMS Solebay. She was then "the finest and most handsome ship-sloop in the British navy". She was sold in 1811. Nimrod made three whaling voyages between 1811 and 1819. On her first she captured several American whalers. Nimrod was last listed in 1820.

== Capture ==
Built in Bordeaux as a privateer corvette, Éole was requisitioned and brought into service in the French Navy in September 1799, and commissioned in Rochefort. HMS Solebay captured her at Saint Domingue on 23 November 1799. (Note: The London Gazette mentions of her capture and of the prize money due for the capture mangle her name. The notice of her capture refers to her as Ealan. The prize money notice refers to her as Elan.) She was one of a squadron of four French vessels, all four of which Solebay captured that day. Éole was described as being of 300 tons, carrying 16 guns, and having a crew of 125 men. She was coming from Cape François and was believed to be sailing to Jacquemel.

The Vice admiralty court at Jamaica condemned her. The Royal Navy then took her into service as HMS Nimrod.

== HMS Nimrod ==
At some point between 28 February and 20 May 1800, Nimrod captured the Spanish felucca Victoria, which was sailing from Tobasco to Jamaica with a cargo of specie, logwood, and cochineal. It is not clear who her commander was while she was in the Caribbean.

Between 21 May and 8 August, Nimrod, Crescent, and Meleager captured two Spanish vessels: a Spanish felucca that was sailing from Havanah to Vera Cruz, and a xebec sailing from Campeachy to Havana. Nimrod and Crescent also captured or detained three other Spanish vessels: a felucca carrying wax, a xebec carrying hides and leather, and a schooner sailing from Saint Domingo to Curacoa carrying mahogany.

Nimrod arrived at Plymouth on 26 January 1801 where she underwent fitting. (Note: Some records suggest that Lieutenant Marsh (acting) commissioned her. It is worth noting that at this time Lieutenant William Marsh was captain of the hired armed cutter Nimrod. The similarity of the names of contemporaneous commanders and vessels raises the possibility of a misattribution.) Commander John Edwards commissioned her for Channel service.

Between June and July 1803 Nimrod underwent refitting, while Commander Terrence O'Neill commissioned her on 7 June. He had 24-pounder carronades replace her 18-pounders, and had her complement increased from 86 to 121 men. He then served on the Mount's Bays station where he also had the brig-sloop Seagull, and two Revenue cutters under his command.

In late November Nimrod detained and sent into Portsmouth Diana, Bunting, master, which had been sailing from Lisbon to Amsterdam. Diana arrived in Plymouth on 19 November. A few days later Nimrod detained and sent into Plymouth Hindemann, of Bremen, which had been sailing from Bordeaux to Embden. Hiindeman arrived in Plymouth on 22 November. In July 1804 the development of debilitating sea-sickness forced O'Neill to resign his commission. (Note: On 14 October he was appointed commander of the Kinsale district of the Sea Fencibles.)

Nimrod sailed for the Leeward Islands in November 1804. Nimrod recaptured a brig that the French privateer Dame Ernouf had captured before herself falling prey to HMS Curieux.

In January 1805 Nimrod recaptured the American ship Ardent, which had been carrying coffee and logwood when a French privateer had captured her.

Commander Thomas Orde took command in 1805, but died that same year. Commander Thomas John Cochrane assumed command in September but left in January 1806 to take command of Jason. Between 25 October 1805 and 15 January 1806 Commander Frank Collier commanded Nimrod.

Commander John Haswell assumed command on 6 August 1806.

At some point Commander Hugh Cameron commanded Nimrod. On 4 August 1807 the merchants of Essequibo and Demerara presented Cameron with a sword worth 100 guineas in recognition of his services in the protection of the colony and its trade.

Commander Joseph Spear assumed command of Nimrod in 1807. At some point Spear and Nimrod captured the Spanish packet Firmeza, which had been sailing from Cadiz to Cartagena, Colombia.

On 27 July 1807, Nimrod captured the French privateer schooner Nouvelle Enterprise some 20 leagues east of Barbados. Nouvelle Enterprise, of Guadeloupe, was armed with a 12-pounder gun and four carronades, and had a crew of 55 men under the command of Captain Francis Penaud. (Note: A first-class share of the prize money was worth £47 7s 6d; a fifth-class share, that of a seaman, was worth 7s 8¼d.) The Royal Navy took her into service as HMS Venturer.

From April to mid-June 1808 Nimrod and Cherub cruised in company, and agreed to share any prizes they captured. Around 9 May Cherub captured the privateer schooner Vaillante, Dubois, master, which was armed with swivel guns and small arms. (Note: A brief mention in the London Gazette credits the capture to both Cherub and Nimrod, and describes Vaillante as being armed with one gun.) Her crew abandoned her and escaped ashore, leaving behind one man who was sick and who died the next day. Cherub and Nimrod then used the schooner as a tender. On 17 May Nimrod captured a Spanish schooner carrying hides, cocoa, and indigo. She was Esther, sailing from La Guayra to Teneriffe. Lastly, on 22 May, Cherub and Nimrod jointly captured a Spanish letter of marque brig after a brief exchange of fire when the British sent in a boarding party in boats after her crew had run her ashore. She was armed with two guns and four howitzers but her crew abandoned her before the boarding party arrived. She had been carrying a cargo of cocoa from Cumano to Barcelona when the British intercepted her. The British were able to retrieve her, though not without difficulty. Nimrod then took the prizes into St Thomas. There the estimates were that the brig's cargo was worth about $20,000, and the Spanish schooner about $1200. (Note: In April 1808 John Augustine Waller was appointed surgeon aboard Nimrod. He kept a diary, which provides a full and fascinating account of the period during which Nimrod and Cherub sailed in company. A brief report in the London Gazette of a letter from Tucker misnames Nimrod as the cutter Nimble. Other than that it provides few details, some of which are wrong.)

Nimrod, Circe, and Cygnet shared in the proceeds of the American schooner Minerva, forwarded from Saint Christoper.

In the second half of 1808, Commander Nevinson de Courcy, late of Fawn, took command of Nimrod and sailed her back to Britain.

Disposal: Nimrod was laid up at Deptford in May 1809. The "Principal Officers and Commissioners of His Majesty's Navy" offered "Nimrod Brig, of 345 Tons" for sale at Deptford on 21 February 1811. She sold there on that date.

== Whaler ==
John Soady Rains either purchased her, or purchased her from her purchasers. In either case, she then made three whaling voyages for him between September 1811 and 3 October 1819. She entered Lloyd's Register in 1811.

=== 1st whaling voyage ===
Nimrod, William Perry, master, left Britain on 26 September 1811 with destination the Galapagos, However, she was reported to have been chased into port on 1 November by a French privateer. She sailed from Falmouth on 13 November for the South Seas.

In June 1812 Nimrod was at Post Office Bay in the Galapagos. On 18 December 1812 Rains received a letter of marque on behalf of Perry and Nimrod. On 8 December she was at 8°0′N 22°0′W. She was reported at the Galapagos on 22 April 1813 with 1300 barrels.

Around March 1813, Nimrod captured the American vessel Barclay, of New Bedford. Barclay had separated from the Spanish guarda costa Cuenia on 21 March.

Nimrod was at St Helena on 25 June 1813 with two US prizes, one of which was the whaler Walker. She may also have captured a third American whaler that she had sent to St. Helena. Nimrod was reported on 9 November to have returned home with the US prize Walker. (Note: Walker, launched 1801 at New Bedford, Stephen West, master, was captured on 23 March 1813.) By 20 November Nimrod, James Allan Day, master, had completed her voyage.

The story of the capture and fate of the two prizes, Barclay and Walker, is complex, with various inconsistent accounts. American records report that in March 1813 Captain David Porter and the USS Essex captured the Peruvian warship Nereyda. Nereyda had captured two American whalers, Walker and Barclay, only to have Nimrod take Walker. Nereyda had sent Barclay to Callao, where Porter was able to recapture her before she could enter port. He sent a disarmed Nereyda back to the Peruvian authorities as a gesture of good will. He searched for Nimrod and Walker, but was unable to find them. (Note: Barclay, Gideon Randall, master, completed her voyage, returning to New Bedford in March 1814 with 1800 barrels of whale oil. Built in 1793, she continued to hunt whales through 1857, and was finally broken up in 1859.)

=== 2nd whaling voyage ===
James Allan Day sailed Nimrod from Britain on 10 May 1814 for the Brazil Banks. (Note: The Brazil Banks are the edge of the continental shelf to the east and south of latitude 16°S of the coast of South America.) He sailed under a letter of marque dated 23 March.

In 1813, the British East India Company (EIC) had lost its monopoly on the trade between India and Britain. British ships were then free to sail to India or the Indian Ocean under a licence from the EIC. Nimrod's owners applied for a licence on 25 Julyand received the licence on 8 August.

Nimrod was reported to have been off Payta Head on 13 December 1815 with 500 barrels. On 23 April 1816 Nimrod was off the coast of Peru with 1500 barrels of oil. In December 1816 the stroke of a whale drowned Day, the Mate, and a boat crew. Nimrod then put into Rio de Janeiro in distress. On 3 February 1817 Nimrod was off Cape Clear under jury masts, main top mast, and bowsprit. Under the command of Captain Thomas she returned to Britain on 26 March 1817.

=== 3rd whaling voyage ===
Nimrod left Britain on 8 July 1817 under the command of Captain Folger (or O. Tolger). In January 1818 she was reported to have 150 barrels of whale oil and a new master, Easton. She returned to Britain on 3 October 1819 with 500 casks of whale oil, and another master, Gulliver.

== Fate ==
Nimrod was last listed in Lloyd's Register and the Register of Shipping in the volumes for 1820.
