= British Tar (1797 ship) =

History

Great Britain
- Name: British Tar
- Owner: Preston Edgar, Philip Masey, John Farquharson, James Curtis, John Oldham, and Thomas Wilmot (1805: all of Bristol)
- Builder: Plymouth (probably Massachusetts)
- Launched: 1797
- Fate: Captured 1805

France
- Name: Revanche
- Acquired: July 1807 by purchase of a prize
- Captured: December 1808

General characteristics
- Tons burthen: 230, or 232 (bm)
- Complement: 1805:30, or 35; 1807:200; 1808:44
- Armament: 1805:12 × 6-pounder guns; 1807:1 × 12-pounder + 6 × 4-pounder guns; 1808:6 × 12-pounder guns

British Tar was built in 1797 in Plymouth (probably Plymouth, Massachusetts). She never enters Lloyd's Register under that name, suggesting that she may have been an American vessel that only came to Bristol, and was renamed, shortly before she sailed from Bristol in 1805. In 1805 she made a slave trading voyage during which the French captured her. She became the privateer Revanche, out of Guadeloupe. Revanche fought an inconclusive single-ship action in 1806 with HMS Curieux. The British captured Revanche in 1808.

== Slaver ==
British Tar appears in the Bristol Presentments for 1805 and 1806, but not before or later. Captain James Gordon received a letter of marque on 14 November 1805.

British Tar, Gordon, master, sailed from Bristol on 30 December 1805, bound for West Africa. She was reported "well" in the River Gambia on 13 May 1806 and was expected to leave in a few days. A second report has her "all well" at Goree on 26 July, and expected to sail for the West Indies on 26 July. However, the next report has a privateer of ten guns and 70 men capturing British Tar, of Bristol, on 18 July and taking her into Guadeloupe.

== French privateer Revanche ==
The French commissioned British Tar as the privateer Revanche in Guadeloupe in September 1807 under Captain Alexis Grassin. She made a second cruise between November 1807 and January 1808 under Captain Vidal.

On 3 December 1807 Revanche encountered HMS Curieux. Rather than fleeing, Revanche, which was more heavily armed than Curieux (British records), or less heavily armed (French records), decided to give battle. The ensuing engagement was sanguinary but inconclusive. Revanche suffered two men killed and 13 wounded; Curieux seven killed and 14 wounded.

== Fate ==
Revanche made a third cruise in 1808. On 5 December 1808 HMS Belette captured Revanche, of six 12-pounder guns and 44 men, and described as a letter of marque brig. Revanche was taking provisions from Bordeaux to Guadeloupe when she encountered Belette. Captain Sanders described Revanche as having been "a very successful Privateer all this War, and was intended for a Cruizer in those Seas." Belette sent Revanche into Antigua.

British Tar was still listed in Lloyd's Register and the Register of Shipping until at least 1812, but with long stale data.
