= HMS Curieux (1804) =

Brig-sloop of the Royal Navy

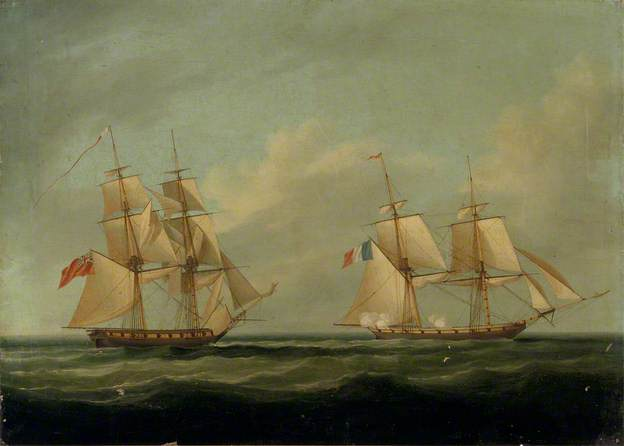
- A painting by Francis Sartorius Jr. depicting HMS Curieux capturing Dame Ernouf on 8 February 1805

History

France
- Name: Curieux
- Builder: Enterprise Ethéart, Saint Malo (Constructeur:François-Timothée Pestel)
- Laid down: October 1799
- Launched: 20 September 1800
- Captured: 4 February 1804

United Kingdom
- Name: HMS Curieux
- Acquired: 4 February 1804
- Fate: Wrecked, 22 September 1809

General characteristics
- Type: Corvette
- Displacement: 290 tons (French)
- Tons burthen: 3295/94 (bm) (Note: This tonnage is not consistent with the recorded dimensions below. The burthen per the dimensions is 33371/94.)
- Length: 97 ft 0 in (29.57 m) (overall); 77 ft 3 in (23.55 m) (keel) (Note: This keel length is not consistent with the burthen above.)
- Beam: 28 ft 6 in (8.69 m)
- Depth of hold: 13 ft 0 in (3.96 m)
- Complement: French service: 94; British service: 67
- Armament: French service: 16 × 6-pounder guns; British service: 8 × 6-pounder guns + 10 × 24-pounder carronades

HMS Curieux was a French corvette launched in September 1800 at Saint-Malo to a design by François Pestel, and carrying sixteen 6-pounder guns. She was commissioned under Capitaine de frégate Joseph-Marie-Emmanuel Cordier. The British captured her in 1804 in a cutting-out action at Martinique. In her five-year British career Curieux captured several French privateers and engaged in two notable single-ship actions, also against privateers. In the first she captured Dame Ernouf; in the second, she took heavy casualties in an indecisive action with Revanche. In 1809 Curieux hit a rock; all her crew were saved but they had to set fire to her to prevent her recapture.

== Design ==
Curieux was a prototype, and the only vessel of her class. Construction on the subsequent Curieux-class brigs started in 1803.

== Capture ==
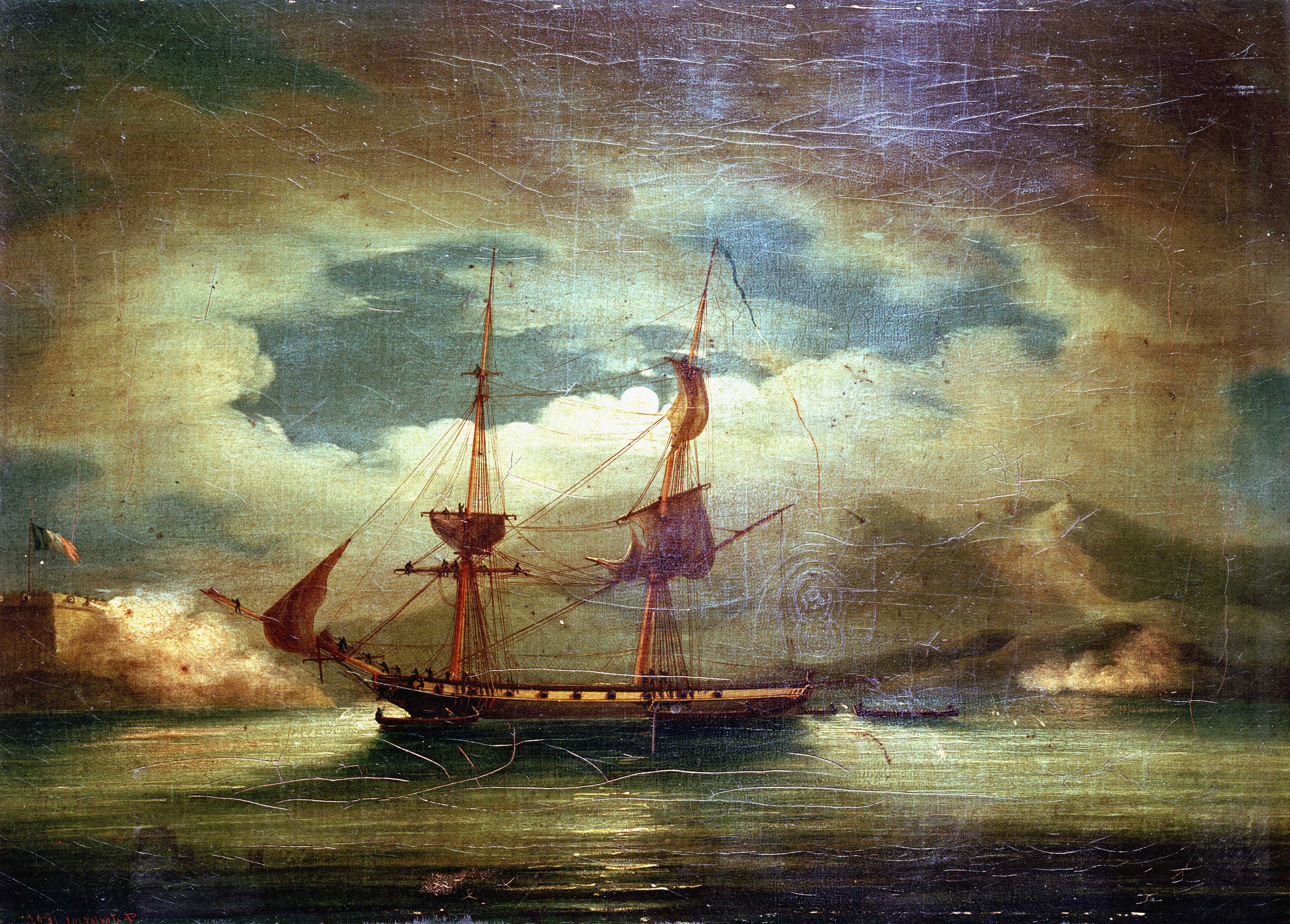
Cutting out Curieux at Martinique on 3 February 1804

On 4 February 1804, HMS Centaur sent four boats and 72 men under Lieutenant Robert Carthew Reynolds to cut her out at Fort Royal harbour, Martinique. The British suffered nine wounded, two of whom, including Reynolds, later died. The French suffered ten dead and 30 wounded, many mortally. Cordier, wounded, fell into a boat and escaped. The British sent Curieux under a flag of truce to Fort Royal to hand the wounded over to their countrymen.

The Royal Navy took her into service as HMS Curieux, a brig-sloop. Reynolds commissioned her but he had been severely wounded in the action and though he lingered for a while, died in September.

Reynold's successor was George Edmund Byron Bettesworth, who had been a lieutenant on Centaur and part of the cutting out expedition. Curieux's first lieutenant was John George Boss who had been a midshipman on Centaur and also in the cutting out expedition.

In June 1804, Curieux recaptured the English brig Albion, which was carrying a cargo of coal. Then, on 15 July, she captured the French privateer schooner Elizabeth of six guns. That same day she captured the schooner Betsey, which was sailing in ballast.

In September Curieux recaptured the English brig Princess Royal, which was carrying government stores. Then in January 1805 Curieux recaptured an American ship, from St. Domingo, that was carrying coffee. The American had been the prize of a French privateer.

== Curieux and Dame Ernouf ==
Then on 8 February 1805, Curieux chased the French privateer Dame Ernouf (or Madame Ernouf) for twelve hours before she able to bring her to action. After forty minutes of hard fighting Dame Ernouf, which had a crew almost double in size relative to that of Curieux, maneuvered to attempt a boarding. Bettesworth anticipated this and put his helm a-starboard, catching his opponent's jib-boom so that he could rake the French vessel. Unable to fight back, Dame Ernouff struck. The action cost Curieux five men killed and four wounded, including Bettesworth, who took a hit in his head from a musket ball. Dame Ernouf had 30 men killed and 41 wounded. She carried 16 French long 6-pounder guns and had a crew of 120. This was the same armament as Curieux carried, but in a smaller vessel. Bettesworth opined that she had fought so gallantly because her captain was also a part-owner. She was 20 days out of Guadaloupe and had taken one brig, which, however, Nimrod had recaptured. The British took Dame Ernouf into service as Seaforth, but she capsized and foundered in a gale on 30 September 1805. There were only two survivors.

On 25 February Curieux, under Bettesworth, captured a Spanish launch, name unknown, which she took into Tortola. (Note: The prize netted each ordinary seaman on Curieux £10 5s 14d. This represented more than six months' wages.)

Lieutenant Boss was on leave at the time of the action but later took over as acting commander while Bettesworth recuperated. At Cumana Gut, Boss cut out several schooners and later took a brig from St. Eustatia. Curieux and the schooner Tobago cooperated in capturing two merchantmen lying for protection under the batteries at Barcelona, on the coast of Caraccas.

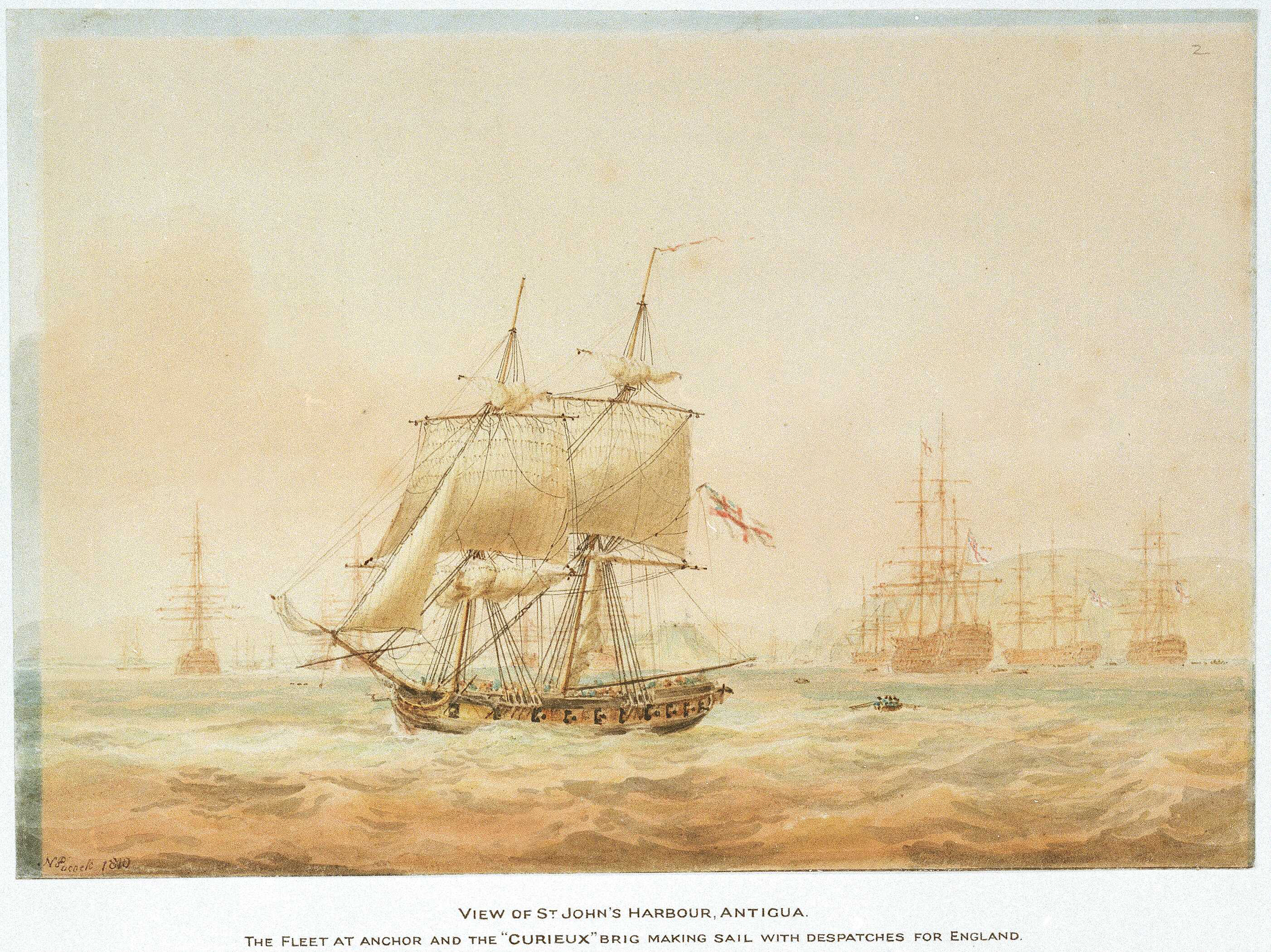
View of St John's Harbour, Antigua; the fleet at anchor and the brig Curieux making sail with dispatches for England (12 June 1805)

On 7 July, Curieux arrived in Plymouth with dispatches from Lord Nelson. On her way, she had spotted Admiral Villeneuve's Franco-Spanish squadron on its way back to Europe from the West Indies and alerted the Admiralty. Rear-Admiral Sir Robert Calder, with 15 ships of the line, intercepted Villeneuve on 22 July, but the subsequent Battle of Cape Finisterre was indecisive, with the British capturing only two enemy ships.

James Johnstone took command of Curieux in July 1805. After refitting she sailed for the Lisbon station. On 25 November 1805 Curieux captured the Spanish privateer Brilliano, under the command of Don Joseph Advis, some 13 leagues (63 km) west of Cape Selleiro. She was a lugger of five carriage guns and a crew of 35 men. Brilliano, which had been out five days from Port Carrel and two days before Cureux captured her, had taken the English brig Mary, sailing from Lynn to Lisbon with a cargo of coal. Brilliano had also taken the brig Nymphe, which had been sailing from Newfoundland with a cargo of fish for Viana. The next day Curieux apparently captured San Josef el Brilliant. (Note: This may have been the same vessel as the Brilliano.)

On 5 February 1806, two years after her own capture, Curieux captured the 6-gun privateer Baltidore (alias Fenix) and her crew of 47 men. The capture occurred 27 leagues west of Lisbon after a chase of four hours. Baltidore had been out of Ferrol one month, during which time she had captured Good Intent, which had been sailing from Lisbon for London. About a month earlier, on 3 January, Mercury had recaptured Good Intent, which had been part of a convoy that Mercury had been escorting from Newfoundland to Portugal.

== Curieux and Revanche ==
In March 1806 John Sheriff took over as captain of Curieux. On 3 December 1807, off Barbados, Curieux, now armed with eight 6-pounders and ten 18-pounder carronades, engaged the 25-gun privateer Revanche, commanded by Captain Vidal. Revanche, which had been the slaver British Tar, was the more heavily armed (chiefly English 9-pounders, and one long French 18-pounder upon a traversing carriage on the forecastle) and had a crew of 200 men. Revanche nearly disabled Curieux, while killing Sheriff. Lieutenant Thomas Muir wanted to board Revanche, but too few crewmen were willing to follow him. The two vessels broke off the action and Revanche escaped. Curieux, whose shrouds and back-stays were shot away, and whose two topmasts and jib-boom had been damaged, was unable to pursue.

In addition to the loss of her captain, Curieux had suffered another seven dead and 14 wounded. Revanche, according to a paragraph in the Moniteur, lost two men killed and 13 wounded. Curieux, as soon as her crew had partially repaired her, made sail and anchored the next day in Carlisle Bay, Barbados. A subsequent court martial into why Muir had not taken or destroyed the enemy vessel mildly rebuked Muir for not having hove-to repair his vessel's damage once it became obvious that Curieux was in no condition to overtake Revanche.

== Further service ==
In February 1808 Commander Thomas Tucker assumed command, to be succeeded by Commander Andrew Hodge. Lieutenant Henry George Moysey, possibly acting, then took command. Under his command Curieux was engaged in the blockade of Guadeloupe, where she cut out a privateer from St. Anne's Bay, Jamaica.

On 18 February 1809, Latona captured the French frigate Felicité. Curieux shared in the prize money, together with all the other vessels that been associated in the blockade of the Saintes.

== Loss ==
On 22 September 1809, at about 3:30am, Curieux struck a rock off Petit-Terre off the Îles des Saintes. The rock was 30 yards (27 m) from the beach in 11 feet (3.4 m) of water. At first light, Hazard came to her assistance and her guns and stores were removed. Hazard then winched Curieux off a quarter of a cable but she slipped back and ran directly onto the reef. There she bilged. All her crew was saved but the British burned her to prevent her recapture. A court martial board found Lieutenant John Felton, the officer of the watch, guilty of negligence and dismissed him from the service. Moysey died the next month of yellow fever. (Note: One of Curieux's officers at the time was Lieutenant Provo Wallis, who went on to establish a record in the Royal Navy for length of service.)

== Post script ==
On 30 August 1860, the Prince of Wales was visiting Sherbrooke, where he met John Felton, who had emigrated to Canada after being dismissed the service. The Prince of Wales exercised his royal prerogative and restored Felton to his erstwhile rank in the Navy.
