= HMS Venturer (1807) =

History

France
- Name: Nouvelle Enterprise
- Builder: Livorno
- Launched: 1807
- Captured: 1807

United Kingdom
- Name: HMS Venturer
- Acquired: 1807 by capture
- Renamed: HMS Theodosia (1808)
- Fate: Sold 1814

United Kingdom
- Name: Theodosia
- Acquired: 1814 by purchase
- Fate: Last listed in 1822

General characteristics
- Tons burthen: 126, or 128, or 129 (bm)
- Length: Overall:72 ft 0 in (21.9 m); Keel:57 ft 0 in (17.4 m)
- Beam: 20 ft 5 in (6.2 m)
- Sail plan: Schooner, later brig
- Complement: 55 (at capture)
- Armament: 1 × 12-pounder gun + 4 carronades (at capture)

HMS Venturer was launched at Livorno in 1807 as the French privateer Nouvelle Enterprise. The Royal Navy captured her in 1807 in the West Indies and initially took her into service. It renamed her Theodosia (or Theodocia) in 1808. She served in the Mediterranean until the Navy sold her in 1814. She then became the mercantile Theodosia. She traded between London and Rio de Janeiro and was last listed in 1822.

== Capture ==
On 27 July 1807, HMS Nimrod captured the French privateer schooner Nouvelle Enterprise some 20 leagues east of Barbados. Nouvelle Enterprise, of Guadeloupe, was armed with a 12-pounder gun and four carronades, and had a crew of 55 men under the command of Captain Francis Penaud. (Note: A first-class share of the prize money was worth £47 7s 6d; a fifth-class share, that of a seaman, was worth 7s 8¼d.) The Royal Navy took her into service as HMS Venturer, later renamed HMS Theodosia.

== Career ==
She was registered on 19 December 1808 as HMS Theodosia. Lieutenant Thomas Young commissioned her in 1809 for the Mediterranean.

In early September 1812 Theodosia, Lieutenant Younger, reportedly destroyed a privateer of 22 guns near Scio.

Theodosia took two prizes as well, La Pace and Betsey.

She also appeared in some memoirs. Lieutenant Young provided passage to James Silk Buckingham, and to the wife of an anonymous writer.

Theodosia returned to England and was paid off on 10 October 1814.

Disposal: The "Principal Officers and Commissioners of His Majesty's Navy" offered the "Theodosia schooner, of 128 tons," lying at Chatham, for sale on 15 December 1814. She sold on that day for £310.

== Merchantman ==
Theodosia, a brig of 129 tons (bm) and Mediterranean origin, entered Lloyd's Register (LR) in 1815.

Year	Master	Owner	Trade	Source
1815	M'Gowan	Rattenbury	London–Rio de Janeiro	LR
1820	M'Gowan	Rattenbury	London–Rio de Janeiro	LR

The Theodosia arrived in Table Bay, South Africa ex London and Rio de Janeiro on 18 November 1818 with John BROOKS, a gardener, and his wife on board.

== Fate ==
Theodosia was last listed in 1822.
