= HMS Laura (1806) =

Adonis-class schooner

History

United Kingdom
- Name: HMS Laura
- Owner: Royal Navy
- Builder: Bermuda
- Launched: 1806
- Commissioned: 1806
- Honours and awards: Naval General Service Medal with clasp "Guadaloupe"
- Captured: 8 September 1812
- Fate: Captured by France

United States
- Name: Hebe
- Acquired: 1812
- Captured: April 1813
- Fate: Recaptured by Royal Navy

General characteristics
- Class & type: Adonis-class schooner
- Tons burthen: 110 93/94 (bm)
- Length: Gundeck:68 ft 2 in (20.8 m); Keel:50 ft 5 5/8 in (15.4 m)
- Beam: 20 ft 4 in (6.2 m)
- Depth of hold: 10 ft 3 in (3.12 m)
- Complement: 35 men and boys
- Armament: 10 × 18-pounder carronades

HMS Laura was an Adonis-class schooner of the Royal Navy, launched in 1806 at Bermuda. Laura served during the Napoleonic Wars before a French privateer captured her at the beginning of the War of 1812. She was briefly an American letter of marque before the British recaptured her in 1813. Despite having recaptured her, the British did not return Laura to service.

== Adonis-class schooners ==
Laura was built at Bermuda of the pencil cedar . The Adonis-class schooners were a little larger and much better armed than the Ballahoo- and Cuckoo-class schooners that they followed. The Admiralty's intent was to improve survivability of these dispatch boats.

== Service ==
In March 1806 Laura was commissioned under Lieutenant Joseph R.R. Webb, for the Channel.

In 1807 Lieutenant Robert Yetts took command and on 28 March he sailed Laura for the Leeward Islands. On 4 August 1807, Laura was in company with the schooner Ballahoo, of four guns, when they encountered the French letter of marque brig Rhone some 16 miles north of Tobago. After a running fight of several hours, they captured Rhone after she had suffered two dead and five wounded out of her crew of 26; the British had no casualties. Rhone, under the command of Francis Goureu, was of 90 tons (bm), mounted six long 6-pounder guns, and was 10 days out from Martinique, having captured nothing.

In 1809 Lieutenant Charles Newton Hunter took command in the Leeward Islands. On 6 February 1810 Laura was present at the surrender of Guadeloupe. (Note: A first-class share of the prize money for Guadaloupe was worth £113 3s 1¼d; a sixth-class share, that of an ordinary seaman, was worth £1 9s 1¼d.) In 1847 the Admiralty the Naval General Service Medal with clasp "Guadaloupe" to all surviving claimants from the campaign.

=== Capture ===
In August 1812 Laura was escorting convoys but on 8 September she encountered the French privateer brig Diligent, under Alexis Grassin, off the Delaware River. Laura had just captured three American prizes and was in the process of taking a fourth when Diligent arrived on the scene. Hunter recalled his boat and her men from the prize and sailed to engage, even though he knew from his third prize that Diligent out-manned and outgunned Laura.

Laura's crew had been reduced to 41 men because of the need to man the prizes she had taken, and she was short of officers for the same reason. The need to guard 25 American prisoners further reduced her effective strength. At the time of the engagement, Laura carried two short 9-pounders in addition to her ten 18-pounder carronades, while Diligent normally carried 16 French 24-pounder carronades and two long 12-pounder guns. However, Diligent had stowed three of her cannon in the hold for stability in a recent gale. She also had a crew of 97 men rather than her usual 120.

The two vessels exchanged fire for an hour. Fire from Diligent wounded Hunter and the sole remaining officer, Midshipman John Griffith, and killed or wounded 13 of Laura's crew of 41. Consequently, the crew hardly resisted when the French finally were able to board. Lloyd's List reported that Laura had lost one man killed and six wounded out of her crew of 48 men, and that Diligent had lost one man killed and nine wounded out of her crew of 78 men.

Captain Grassin of Diligent took his prize to Philadelphia. One of Laura's prizes was the Rising States, which Diligent recaptured and sent into Philadelphia; Rising states arrived there on 12 September.

At his court martial at Halifax the Board acquitted Hunter for the loss of Laura. The combination of Laura's loss and the belief Diligent had also had heavy casualties of nine killed and 10 wounded provided clear evidence that Hunter had done his utmost. However, the board condemned Seaman James Cooper, who had surrendered Laura while Hunter was having his wounds dressed, to death. Later his sentence was reduced to seven years transportation.

The month before her encounter with Laura, Diligent had captured the schooner Whiting, one of the smaller Ballahoo class schooners.

== Fate ==
Laura became the American letter of marque Hebe, John Picarare (or Picarrere), master, of two guns and 15 men. (Note: Maclay says Hebe carried 12 guns, however the account of the recapture by Captain George Salt of the Unicorn confirms two guns and 15 men.) In April 1813, the British fifth-rate frigates Stag and Unicorn recaptured her as she was sailing to Bordeaux or Nantes. However, the Admiralty did not take her back into service.
