= Elizabeth (1806 ship) =

History

United Kingdom
- Name: Elizabeth
- Owner: John & Philip Hind
- Launched: 1806, Liverpool
- Fate: Captured 1807

General characteristics
- Tons burthen: 144, or 148 (bm)
- Sail plan: Snow
- Complement: 24, or 25
- Armament: 14 × 6-pounder guns, or carronades

Elizabeth was a snow launched in 1806 at Liverpool for the slave trade. Captain John Flinn left Liverpool on 19 April 1807 and gathered captives in West Africa. She was reported at Angola. Lloyd's List reported in January 1808 that Elizabeth, Flynn, master, from Africa, had been taken and sent into Guadaloupe.

On 17 October the French privateer Général Ernouf, under the command of the French privateer captain Alexis Grassin, captured Elizabeth after Elizabeth had embarked her slaves. Général-Ernouf sent her into Guadeloupe with her cargo of 176 captives. There she sold for 31,852 francs.

In 1807, 12 British slave ships were lost while engaging in the slave trade. Of these 12, six were lost in the Middle Passage between Africa and the West Indies. Because of the passage of the Slave Trade Act 1807, which ended British participation in the trans-Atlantic slave trade, 1807 was a truncated year, statistically speaking. During the period 1793 to 1807, war, rather than maritime hazards or resistance by the captives, was the greatest cause of vessel losses among British slave vessels.
