= HMS Whiting (1805) =

UK naval schooner 1805–1812

History

United Kingdom
- Name: HMS Whiting
- Ordered: 23 June 1803
- Builder: Goodrich & Co. (prime contractor), Bermuda
- Laid down: 1803
- Launched: November 1805
- Honours and awards: Naval General Service Medal with clasp "Basque Roads 1809"
- Captured: American privateer Dash 8 July 1812; released; By French privateer Diligent 22 August 1812

General characteristics
- Type: Ballahoo-class schooner
- Tons burthen: 7041/94 (bm)
- Length: 55 ft 2 in (16.8 m) (overall); 40 ft 10 1/2 in (12.5 m) (keel)
- Beam: 18 ft 0 in (5.5 m)
- Depth of hold: 9 ft 0 in (2.7 m)
- Sail plan: Schooner
- Complement: 20
- Armament: 4 × 12-pounder carronades

HMS Whiting was a Royal Navy Ballahoo-class schooner (a type of vessel often described as a Bermuda sloop) of four 12-pounder carronades and a crew of 20. The prime contractor for the vessel was Goodrich & Co., in Bermuda, and she was launched in 1805. She was a participant at the Battle of Basque Roads. A French privateer captured her at the beginning of the War of 1812, shortly after the Americans had captured and released her in the first naval incident of the war.

== Napoleonic Wars ==
In 1805 Whiting was under the command of Lieutenant John Orkney at Halifax on her way to Portsmouth for completion, which took place between 26 April and 19 May 1806. Before that, however, at end-September she captured and sent into Bermuda an American vessel from Bordeaux carrying brandy and wine.

Whiting was notorious in the Maritimes in 1805 for impressing locals. Although she had been built in Bermuda and had a Bermudian officer, Bermudians were exempted from impressment.

Whiting was commissioned in June 1806 under Lieutenant George Roach for the North Sea. However, already on 18 June Whiting, Moucheron, and the hired armed cutter John Bull arrived at Madeira. They were to join up with a squadron under Sir John Borlase Warren, and they sailed from Madeira to Join it on 21 June.

Even so, Whiting was still or again under the command of Orkney when on 29 November she captured the Spanish lugger Felicided. Orkney had also destroyed another vessel after transferring a small quantity of hides to the Felicidad.

On 7 September 1807 Whiting was part of the fleet at the Battle of Copenhagen.

In January 1808 Lieutenant Henry Wildey assumed command. (Note: For more on Henry Wildey see: O'Byrne, William R. (1849). "Wildey, Henry" . A Naval Biographical Dictionary. London: John Murray.) On 30 June Whiting was in attendance when her sister ship Capelin hit the Parquette Rock off Brest, France, and sank.

At the beginning of March 1809 Whiting joined the fleet assembling for an attack on the French fleet in the Basque Roads. William Congreve, who had arrived with a transport, fitted Whiting and the two hired armed cutters Nimrod and King George with rockets. On 11 April the three vessels took up a position near the Boyart Shoal (see Fort Boyard) while fireships made a night attack on the French ships. The next day all three, together with a number of other vessels, opened fire upon the French ships Océan, Régulus, and the frigate Indienne, as those ships lay aground. The first two eventually escaped, and the last was one of four eventually destroyed, though by her own crew some days later to avoid capture. (Note: Head money was paid in March 1819. An ordinary seaman received 13 shillings; a first-class share was worth £86 13s 2¼d.) In 1847 the Admiralty authorized the issuance of the Naval General Service Medal with clasp "Basque Roads 1809" to all surviving British participants in the battle.

On 13 April Whiting sailed for Portugal. For the next few years she sailed in the Channel, to the west, and to the coast of Spain going as far as Cadiz and Gibraltar. Wildey was promoted to commander on 3 May 1810.

Whiting sent Mountaineer, Dow, master, into Plymouth, where she arrived on 6 July 1811. Mountaineer had been sailing from London to Honduras when she ran into Whiting off Dungeness, carrying away her main mast, and for and mizzen topmast.

On 20 December 1811 Whiting left Plymouth for Padstow, to assist the gun brig Bloodhound, which had run on shore near there.

In 1812 Lieutenant Lewis Maxey assumed command of Whiting. On 1 May he sailed for the Americas.

== War of 1812 ==
Whiting did not survive the opening months of the War of 1812. Having sailed from Plymouth, she entered Hampton Roads on 8 July 1812 with despatches for the American government, and lowered her anchor. Unfortunately war had been declared about two weeks earlier. As Maxey was being rowed ashore, the Norfolk privateer Dash, under Captain Garroway, was leaving port and captured her. Dash had one large gun on a pivot and a crew of 80. Not only were a third of Whiting's crew in her boat, the rest were not at the guns as they were unaware that Britain and the United States were now at war. (Note: Later in 1812 HMS Rhodian and Variable captured Dash.)

This could have been the first naval capture of the war. However, Whiting was carrying official dispatches for the American government, which ordered her release. Instead, the first capture by either side was the British capture of USS Nautilus on 16 July.

In mid-August, the US Revenue Cutter Gallatin led Whiting out to the Hampton Roads and turned over to Maxey her crew "at the place where they were taken". The Americans then ordered Maxey to quit American waters with all possible speed.

== Fate ==
Shortly after Whiting left Hampton Roads for England, on 22 August the French 18-gun privateer brig Diligent, under Alexis Grassin, captured her. On 8 September Diligent would capture the 10-gun schooner HMS Laura.

== Post-script ==
On 21 July HMS Bloodhound came into the Chesapeake, not aware that war had broken out. The privateer Cora took possession of Bloodhound. The US Government released Bloodhound and sent her back to Plymouth with despatches.

== See also ==
- List of historical schooners
- List of ships captured in the 19th century
- List of ships captured in the 18th century
- Bibliography of 18th-19th century Royal Naval history
