= HMS Seaforth =

Brig of the Royal Navy

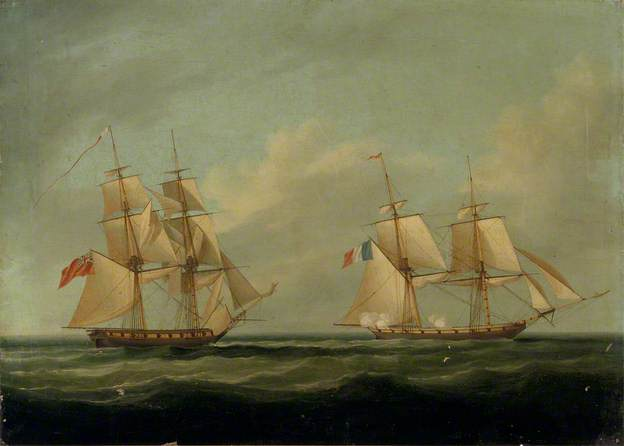
- A painting by Francis Sartorius Jr. depicting HMS Curieux capturing Dame Ernouf on 8 February 1805

History

France
- Name: Dame Ernouf
- Launched: 1805
- Captured: 8 February 1805

United Kingdom
- Name: HMS Seaforth
- Acquired: 8 February 1805 (by capture)
- Fate: Foundered, 30 September 1805

General characteristics
- Type: brig
- Tons burthen: 215 (bm)
- Complement: French service: 120; British service: 86
- Armament: French service: 16 × 6-pounder guns; British service: 4 × 6-pounder guns + 12 × 12-pounder carronades

HMS Seaforth was the French privateer Dame Ernouf, which HMS Curieux captured in 1805. The Royal Navy took her into service, but she foundered later that year.

== Capture ==
On 8 February 1805, Curieux chased the French privateer Dame Ernouf (or Madame Ernouf) for twelve hours before Curieux was able to bring her to action. After forty minutes of hard fighting the captain of Dame Ernouf, which had a crew almost twice as many crew members as Curieux, manoeuvred to attempt a boarding. Commander George Edmund Byron Bettesworth anticipated this and put his helm a-starboard, catching Dame Ernouf's jib-boom so that he could rake her. Unable to fight back, Dame Ernouff struck. The action cost Curieux five men killed and four wounded, including Bettesworth, who took a hit in his head from a musket ball. Dame Ernouf had 30 men killed and 41 wounded. She carried 16 French long 6-pounder guns and had a crew of 120. This was the same armament as Curieux carried, but in a smaller vessel. Bettesworth opined that she had fought so gallantly because her captain was also a part-owner. She was 20 days out of Guadeloupe and had taken one brig, which, however, Nimrod had recaptured.

The British took Dame Ernouf into service as HMS Seaforth, presumably naming her after Francis Mackenzie, 1st Baron Seaforth, then Governor of Barbados. The Navy commissioned her under Lieutenant George Steel (or Steele).

== Loss ==
On 30 September a squall off Antigua caught Seaforth and she foundered quickly. There were only two survivors out of her crew of 86 men.
