= Général Ernouf =

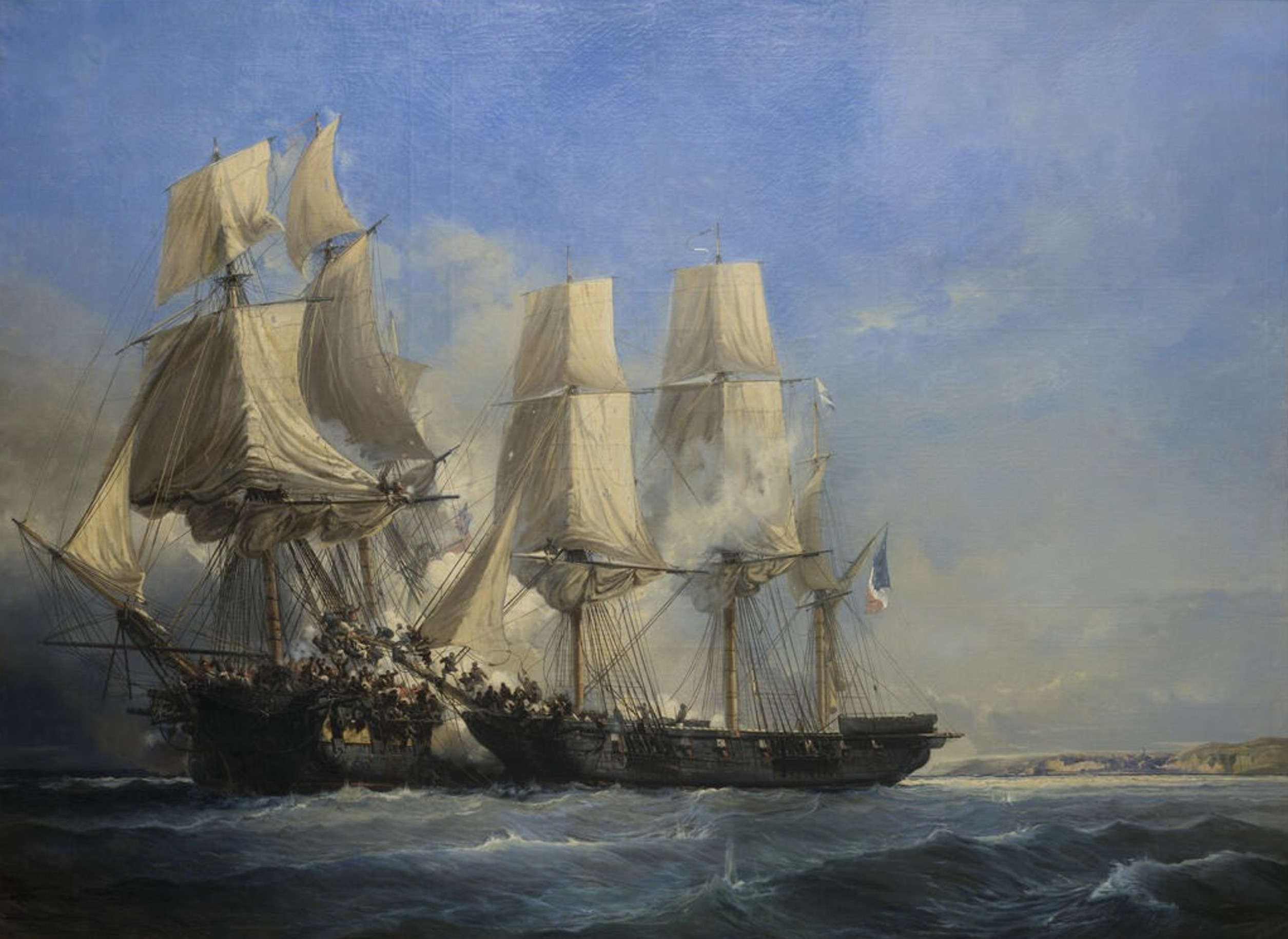
Painting of Général Ernouf (left), as HMS Lilly, being captured by the French privateer Dame Ambert on 15 July 1804

During the Napoleonic Wars, at least four French privateer ships were named Général Ernouf, for Jean Augustin Ernouf, the governor of the colony of Guadeloupe:

- Général Ernouf (General Erneuf in some British records; 1805 – 1805), was the former HMS Lilly, which the French captured in 1805. She cruised under Captains Giraud-Lapointe and Facio. She was under Giraud-Lapointe's command when she blew up during an engagement with HMS Renard.
- Général Ernouf (1805–1808), was a Danish 16-gun brig, originally under the command of the notable French privateer captain Alexis Grassin. (Note: Another source gives her origins as a Swedish vessel taken at Saint Barthélemy. This report describes Général Ernouf as being armed with 30 guns and having a crew of 200 men.) On 3 April 1806 she captured Ruckers, Soper, master, and sent her into Guadeloupe. On 9 August she captured Elizabeth, Murphy, master, as Elizabeth was sailing from Plymouth to Surinam, and sent her into Guadeloupe. On 10 October she captured the 10-gun schooner HMS Tobago. In 1807 she fought an inconclusive action with HMS Mosambique. On 15 September 1807 Général-Ernouf, under Grassin's command, captured the schooner HMS Barbara. A few days later Général-Ernouf captured the slave ship Elizabeth. In February 1808 or so, Général Ernouf captured another slave ship, Harriot, as Harriet was sailing from Africa to the West Indies, and possibly sent her into Cayenne. HMS Arethusa captured Général Ernouf on 29 November 1808.
- Général Ernouf (1809–1809). On 16 October 1809, HMS Hazard and HMS Pelorus were in company when they came upon the French privateer schooner Général Ernouf, which was moored under the guns of the battery of St. Marie on the east coast of the southern part of Guadeloupe. French accounts state that the privateer's crew scuttled her to prevent her capture; Hazard's captain, in his after-action letter, stated that he had sent in a boarding party that set fire to her.
- Général Ernouf (1810–1810), was a 6-gun brig. HMS Freya (or Freija) captured her on 18 January 1810, though the prize-money announcement describes the privateer as of unknown name.

== See also ==
- Dame Ernouf (ship)
