= HMS Barbara (1806) =

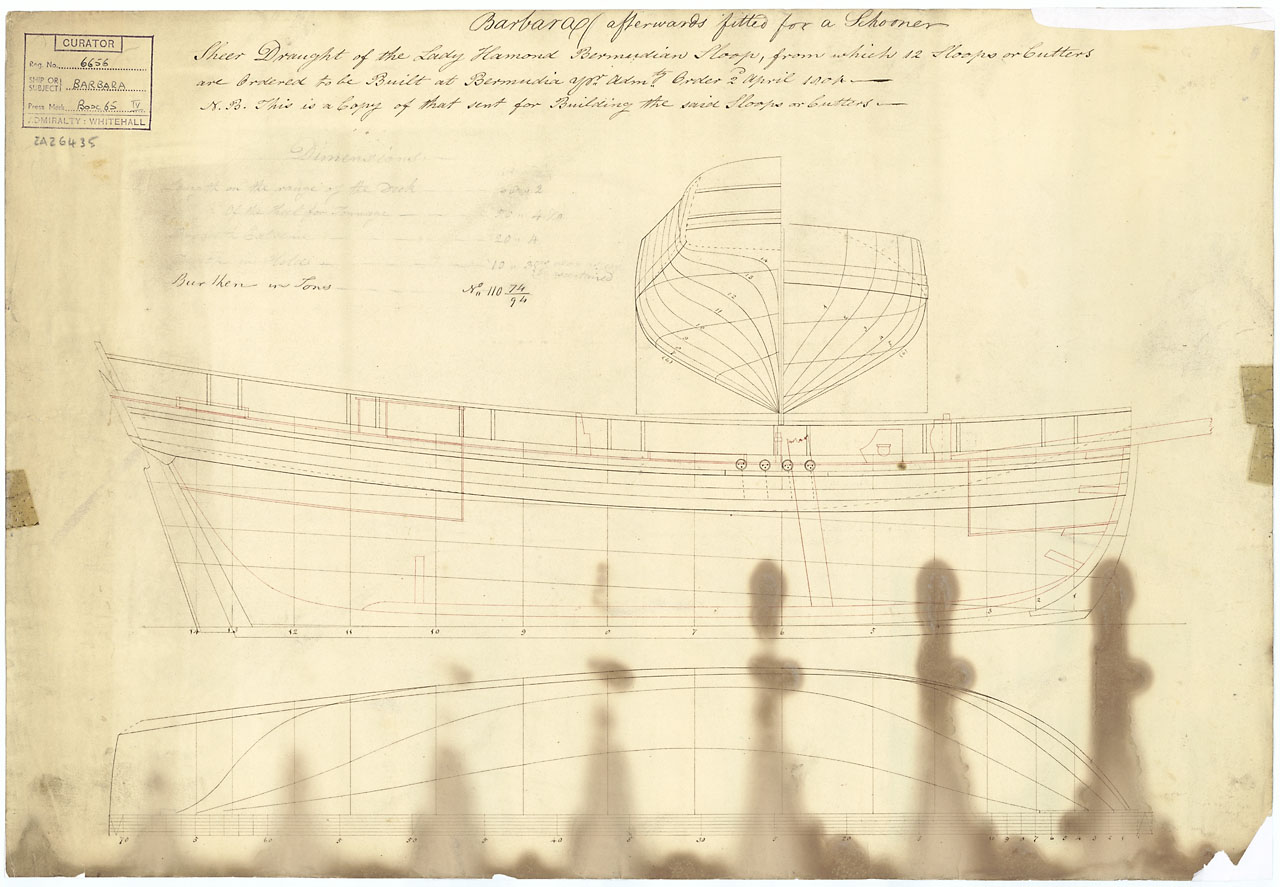
- Plan showing the body plan with half stern board ourtline, sheer lines with some inboard detail, and longitudinal half-breadth for Barbara

History

United Kingdom
- Name: HMS Barbara
- Ordered: 2 April 1804
- Builder: Bermuda
- Launched: early 1806
- Commissioned: March 1806
- Captured: September 1807

France
- Name: Pératy
- Acquired: September 1807 by capture
- Captured: July 1808

United Kingdom
- Name: HMS Barbara
- Acquired: July 1808 by capture
- Fate: Sold 9 February 1815

General characteristics
- Tons burthen: 11093/94 bm
- Length: Overall:68 ft 2 in (20.8 m); Keel:50 ft 5 5/8 in (15.4 m)
- Beam: 20 ft 4 in (6.2 m)
- Depth of hold: 10 ft 3 in (3.1 m)
- Sail plan: Full-rigged ship
- Complement: British service: 35; Privateer: 90
- Armament: Originally: 10 × 18-pounder carronades; Privateer=12 × 18-pounder carronades; Later: 8 × 18-pounder carronades + 2 × 6-pounder guns

HMS Barbara was an Adonis class schooner of the Royal Navy and launched in 1806. A French privateer captured her in 1807 and she became the French privateer Pératy. The Royal Navy recaptured her in 1808, she was paid off in June 1814 and sold in February 1815.

== Capture ==
Barbara was commissioned under the command of Lieutenant Edward A. D'Arcey. On 14 September 1807 Barbara was returning to Demerara from Devils Island when she sighted a brig making for her. When the brig did not return the recognition signals D'Arcey sailed away with the brig giving chase. Next morning the brig resumed the chase and by mid-afternoon it was apparent that Barbara could not escape. D'Arcey turned to engage his pursuer and an engagement followed; after a well-contested action of half an hour the French were able to board and capture Barbara. The British lost four men killed and six wounded, two mortally. (Note: Some French, and British records give the date of the action as 17 September. The same British source describes Barbara as a cutter and that the action took three hours. Another French source agrees on the date 15 September but states that Barbara had a crew of 45 men.)

The French brig was the privateer Général Ernouf, that was under the command of Captain Alexis Grassin. The French took Barbara into Guadeloupe, where her new owners gave her the name Pératy, intending to use her as a privateer. (Note: Demerliac also reports that a Barbara, captured on 15 September 1807, became the privateer Dame Ernouf. The Royal Navy captured Pératy and recognised her as Barbara. A British report states that her captors took Barbara into Cayenne.)

== Recapture ==
In July 1808, the master of an American brig claimed the protection of a convoy from Jamaica, that the 64-gun HMS Veteran was escorting. The American travelled with the convoy for part of its journey but 24 hours after leaving its protection, he betrayed the convoy's strength and course to the French. The French privateer cutter Pératy, under the command of M. Maurison (or Moriseau), took up position in the convoy's path, hoping to capture some of the ships. HMS Guerriere surprised and captured the privateer on 17 July after a chase lasting 24 hours. The privateer was found to be the former Barbara. The French prize crew had sailed Barbara on to Charlestown, where she had been refitted. As Pératy, she had sailed again on 10 July having been furnished with supplies and provisions for three months of raiding. Pératy was armed with twelve 18-pounder carronades and had a crew of 90 men.

A prize crew took Pératy to Halifax, Nova Scotia, where the Admiralty purchased her and took her back into service. Admiral Sir John Borlase Warren renamed her Somers, after Admiral Sir George Somers but the Admiralty over-ruled the renaming and Somers's name reverted to Barbara.

== British service ==
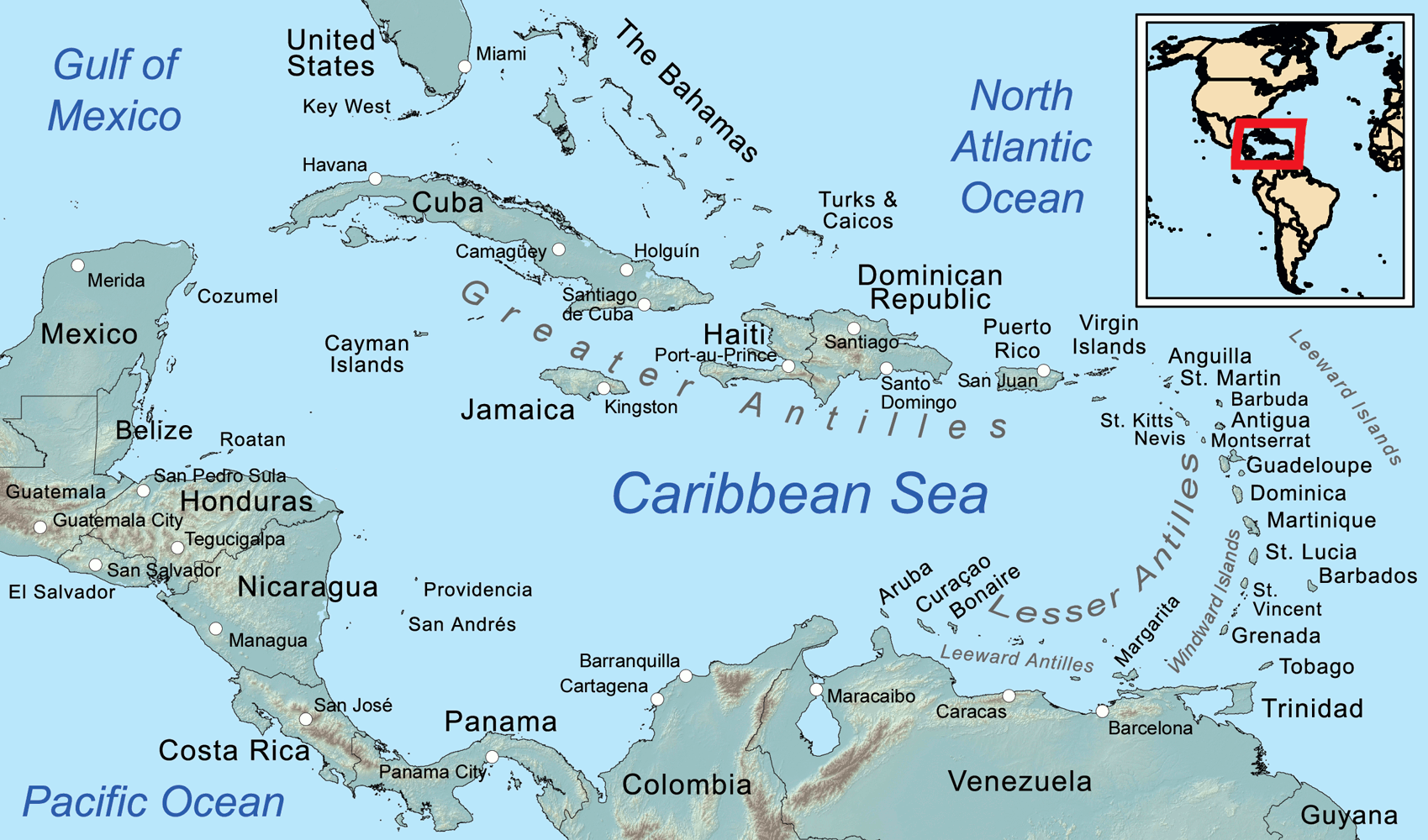
Map of the Caribbean Sea and its islands

In 1809 Lieutenant George Duncan took command and sailed Barbara on the North American station. His replacement, in 1812, was Lieutenant William Douglas, who sailed her on the Downs station. In March 1812 Lieutenant James Morgan assumed command. He spent the rest of the year cruising off the north-west coast of Ireland, and then off Boulogne.

At daybreak on 11 February 1813, Barbara found herself some 3 nmi (5.6 km; 3.5 mi) from the Boulogne pier and near an anchored French lugger. Morgan sailed towards the lugger, that carried 14 guns to capture her. The lugger immediately cut her cables and made to join six more luggers, each armed with eight to 14 guns. The French vessels opened fire, attempting to prevent Barbara's escape. Barbara returned fire and repulsed two attempts to board her. At 9:15 a.m., the French vessels, having sustained four men killed and 11 wounded, including two mortally, retreated. Barbara, though much shot up, had no casualties. The next day she drove a lugger ashore and destroyed it. Barbara shared with Musquito in the capture of Neptune on 11 February 1813. (Note: A second-class share of the prize money was worth £2 6s 6d; a sixth-class share, that of an ordinary seaman, was worth 3s 9d.)

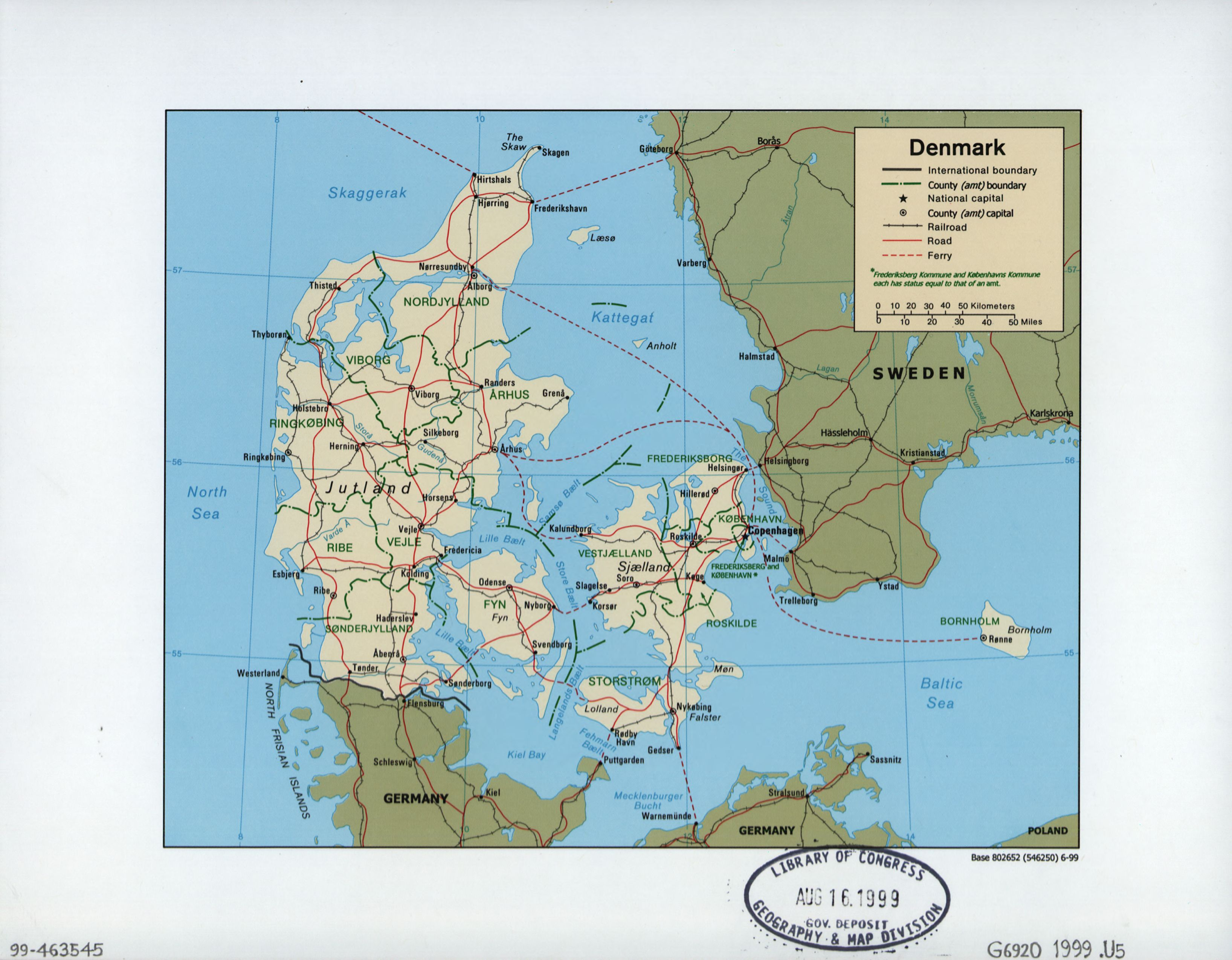
Map of Denmark and its coastline

The next month Barbara joined Rear-Admiral George Hope's squadron and with it sailed to the Baltic. This marked the start of a busy period for her. A month later, on 13 April, Barbara was at Aalborg where she cut out of the anchorage a ship of 400 long tons (410 t), two galliots and a sloop, loaded with grain for the Norwegian market. She escaped with these prizes though nine Danish gunboats pursued her, fortunately never quite getting within range of their guns. Next she moved to the entrance of the Kattegat, where she spent several months skirmishing with Danish naval vessels and flying batteries on shore. On 18 June Barbara boarded and examined a licensed Danish merchantman while being fired on by three brigs of the Danish navy and six gunboats.

On 3 July, near Fladstrand, Barbara engaged in an inconclusive engagement with the Danish praam Norge, which was supported by several other vessels. Norge, of 80 men, was armed with two 32-pounder guns and six 18-pounder carronades. The next day Barbara drove a sloop on shore near The Skaw. Later that month Barbara visited Flagstrand under a flag of truce and anchored near Norge. Her captain remarked that now that he had had the opportunity to see Barbara more closely he knew how to deal with her in the future. Morgan received permission to replace two of her 18-pounder carronades with two 6-pounder bow chasers.

The next month, on 11 August, 26 of Barbara's men in her boats landed on Great Grasholm island. There they destroyed a signal station and a battery of two guns. The Danes did not resist and so there were no casualties on either side. That same day Barbara again engaged Norge and some other vessels in another inconclusive action. Although Barbara only suffered one man wounded, she was badly damaged and had to put into Hawk roads, Gothenburg. While her crew was repairing her she took on so much water that she sank. Morgan was able to refloat her a few days later. Barbara again visited Flagstrand under a flag of truce. There he encountered an officer from Norge who reported that the last encounter with Barbara had cost Norge three men killed and six wounded.

In the early evening of 6 October, Lieutenant Richard Bankes of the gun-brig Forward received intelligence that a Danish privateer of one gun was sailing towards an anchorage about four miles from Wingo Sound, near Goteborg, that English merchantmen were wont to use. (Note: Marshall mis-spells the surname of the commander of HMS Forward) (Note: 'BANKES, Richard: promoted Lieutenant with seniority 29 Oct 1801, discharged dead on 21 Apr 1822') Forward was in company with Barbara so when Bankes set out in a boat with six or seven men, Morgan joined him in a boat with an equal handful. The British found the Dane at about 9:15 p.m. The Danish vessel was armed with a howitzer and had a crew of 25 men. The British captured the vessel, killing five Danes and wounding the captain, a lieutenant, in their attack; British losses consisted of two men killed and three wounded, including Morgan.

Three days later, Barbara was in the company of the privateer Hawke, of Hastings. (Note: This was the privateer Hawke, of 86 tons (bm), four to six 6-pounder carronades, and under the command of John Phillips, which had received her letter of marque on 27 June 1811.) Two gigs from Hawke captured the Danish privateer Aalberg and recaptured her prize near Laeso despite fire from the guns of three Danish gunboats and ten privateers. The recaptured vessel was the Prussian bark Emma.

On 23 November 1813 Barbara captured the Danish brig Wenskabet. Four days later she captured Minerva. Sometime thereafter Barbara returned to Britain. In her nine months in the Baltic she captured or destroyed 2,544 tons (bm) of shipping, and captured 136 seamen.

== Fate ==
Barbara returned to Plymouth and was paid off in June 1814. (Morgan resigned his commission in July to return to Gothenburg to salvage what he could of his affairs following the bankruptcy of his prize agents there.) Barbara was offered for sale at Woolwich on 9 February 1815, was sold on that day and fetched £610.
