= Starling (1802 ship) =

History

United Kingdom
- Name: Starling
- Namesake: Starling
- Builder: Harwich
- Launched: 1802
- Fate: Wrecked 1815
- Notes: Some sources conflate this vessel with Stirling

General characteristics
- Tons burthen: 185, or 186
- Armament: 10 × 9&6-pounder guns

Starling was built at Harwich in 1802. She traded with Smyrna for some years and then became a West Indiaman. In 1810 a French privateer captured her, but the Royal Navy recaptured her within days. After the British East India Company lost its monopoly on the trade between Britain and India, Starling started trading to the Cape of Good Hope (the Cape, or CGH). She wrecked in 1815 off the English coast as she returned from a voyage to Batavia.

== Career ==
Starling first appeared in Lloyd's Register (LR) in 1803 with W. Britton, master and owner, and trade London–Smyrna.

On 15–16 January 1806 a gale at Portsmouth resulted in some damage to vessels there, including Starling, Britten, master. Starling, Britton, master, arrived in the Downs on 22 December, having sailed from Smyrna on 13 October.

Lloyd's Register for 1810 showed Starling's master changing from Leigh to C. Coulson, her owner from Capt. & Co., to Barnes & Co., and her trade from London–Curacoa to London–Martinique.

On 25 July 1810 Starling, Coulson, master, was returning to London from Martinique and St Lucia when she encountered the French privateer Dame Ernouf, of 18 guns and 130 men, nine days into a cruise from Brest. Three days later, on 28 July, HMS Seine recaptured Starling off Brest.

Lloyd's Register for 1813 showed Stirling with R. Sharp, master, changing to W. Thorp, and then to R. Stamp. Her trade was London–Gibraltar.

On 18 January 1814 Starling, Stamp, master, was two days away from Madeira on a voyage from London to the Cape. On 24 January she put into Santa Cruz de Tenerife to repair weather damage. She sailed on the 29th for the Cape.

Lloyd's Register for 1815 showed Starling with R. Stamp, master, Sinclair & Co., owner, and trade London–CGH.

== Fate ==
On 10 February 1815 Lloyd's List reported that Starling, Stamp, master, from Batavia, and Mary Ann, Arbuthnot, master, from Madras and Île de France, both via the Cape of Good Hope and Saint Helena, had arrived in the Downs, having earlier parted from their convoy. On the 13th Starling stranded at Birling Gap, near Beachy Head. Her crew were saved. Most of her stores were saved, as were 2100 bags of coffee, and some sugar. It was expected that the ebony she was carrying would also be saved.
