= Stirling (1812 ship) =

History

United Kingdom
- Name: Stirling
- Builder: Montreal
- Launched: 1812
- Fate: Last listed 1821; possibly wrecked in 1821
- Notes: Some sources conflate this vessel with Starling

General characteristics
- Tons burthen: 383, or 394, or 397 (bm)

Stirling (or Sterling, or Starling) was built in 1812 at Montreal, Quebec. She apparently traded out of Liverpool as a West Indiaman. There is little evidence that she traded as an East Indiaman. She was last listed in 1821 and a vessel named Sterling, sailing out of Quebec, was wrecked in November 1821.

== Career ==
It is not entirely certain when Stirling first entered Lloyd's Register (LR). A Sterling, of 283 tons burthen, launched at Quebec in 1812, entered in 1813 with Greenwood, master, Burrows, owner, and trade Liverpool–St Croix. (Note: The most complete listing of vessels launched at Quebec has no Sterling being launched in 1812. The only Sterling appears in 1874. In subsequent issues of LR, her burthen becomes 383 tons. The Canadian Archives shows Stirling, of 394 tons (bm), launched at Montreal in 1812. It further notes that a letter from Lancaster dated 10 December 1812 reported that she had been re-registered.)

Lloyd's Register for 1818 showed Sterling, launched in Quebec in 1812, of 383 tons burthen, with W. Fryer, master, changing to Bathgate, and Cook & Co., owners. Her trade was Liverpool–Boston, changing to Liverpool–Calcutta.

Lloyd's Register and the Register of Shipping were only as accurate as owners chose to keep them.

It is not clear that Sterling ever sailed to India. The British East India Company (EIC), in 1813 lost its monopoly on the trade between Britain and India. Until 1833, vessels sailing to India and South East-Asia from Britain sailed under a license from the EIC unless they were under contract to the EIC. Sterling/Starling does not appear on the list in Lloyd's Register of vessels sailing under such a license.

Starling, of 383 tons burthen, built at Quebec in 1812, last appeared in the Register of Shipping (RS), in 1820. She was listed with Kennion, master and owner, and trade Liverpool–Demerara. (Note: The only Starling launched in Quebec was launched in 1854.) Sterling last appeared in Lloyd's Register in 1821 with W. Bathgate, master, Waring & Co., owners, and trade Liverpool–Calcutta. She had undergone repairs in 1818.

== Fate ==
A Sterling, Whyte, master, sailing from Quebec to Barbados, was wrecked at Quebec on 24 November during a gale.
