= HMS Forward (1805) =

Brig of the Royal Navy

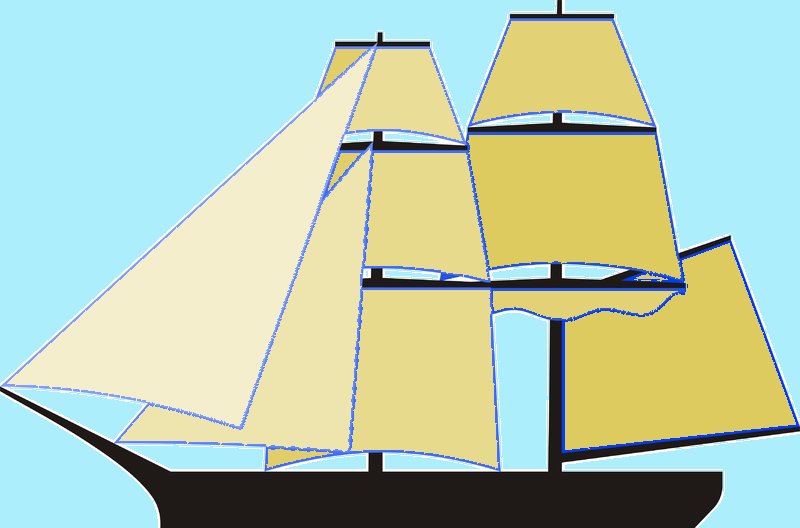
- Configuration of typical brig

History

United Kingdom
- Name: HMS Forward
- Ordered: June 1804
- Builder: Joseph Todd, Berwick
- Laid down: July 1804
- Launched: 4 January 1805
- Commissioned: November 1804
- Fate: Sold 14 December 1815

General characteristics
- Class & type: Archer-class gun-brig
- Tons burthen: 17830/94 bm
- Length: 80 ft 0 in (24.38 m) (gundeck); 65 ft 10 1/4 in (20.072 m) (gundeck)
- Beam: 22 ft 6 3/4 in (6.877 m)
- Depth of hold: 9 ft 5 in (2.87 m)
- Sail plan: Brig
- Complement: 50
- Armament: 10 × 18-pounder carronades + 2 × chase guns

HMS Forward was a 12-gun gun-brig of the Archer class of the British Royal Navy. During the Napoleonic Wars, she was primarily engaged against the Danish in the North Sea. At the end of the War of 1812, she sailed to North America, to escort a convoy comprising 230 ships. She was the last warship to depart from Florida, when the British evacuated their outpost on the Apalachicola River. As the Royal Navy returned to a peace establishment in 1815, she was surplus to requirements, paid off in September, and disposed of in December 1815.

== Service ==
In December 1804, Lieutenant Daniel Shiels commissioned Forward for the Channel.

On 7 February 1806, Forward was some six or seven leagues off Dunnose, Isle of Wight when she sighted and gave chase to a French privateer lugger. After a chase of half-an-hour and some firing, the lugger struck. She was Rancune, Captain Foliot, of Cherbourg and 12 hours out of there, having taken nothing. She was pierced for 12 guns but had only four mounted; she also carried swivel guns and small arms. Two of her crew had been wounded, one dangerously.

On 17 April 1807, forward, Lieutenant Shiels, captured the Danish ship Sylt. (Note: A seaman's share of the prize money was worth £5 9s 6d.) In 1807, Lieutenant Richard Welsh replaced Shiels, but then in 1808, Shiels returned to command.

On 23 April 1808, during the Gunboat War, Forward towed three boats from Daphne and two from Tartarus in an attack on ten laden vessels moored at Fladstrand in Denmark. Despite coming under artillery and musket fire from a fortification, the British successfully spirited away the vessels, with five men wounded in the action. On 2 July 1809, Forward, Lieutenant Shiels, captured the Danish fishing vessel De Hoop. On 26 September 1809, Forward captured Jomfrue Sinneve Christiene, L.F. Grave, master. On 1 October, Forward captured Elizabeth, Hans Olsen, master. On 5 October, Forward captured Stadt Odense, S. Pederson, master.

Circa May 1810, Lieutenant Richard Bankes transferred from the hired armed cutter Duke of York to Forward, on the Leith station. (Note: Ships, their Captains, their Stations, and year built: 778.Forward (GBg).14[guns].Richard Bankes.Spithead.1805) (Note: On Thursday the 15th [November 1810], the Sheriff of Edinburgh granted warrant for imprisoning Lieutenant RICHARD BANKES, commanding his Majesty's gun-brig Forward, till he had caution to the amount of £100, to stand trial within six months, for the crime of forcing a Sheriff Officer, and of resisting execution of a warrant issued by the Sheriff Substitute of Shetland, of which he stands accused at the instance of his Majesty's Advocate.) (Note: 'BANKES, Richard: promoted Lieutenant with seniority 29 Oct 1801, discharged dead on 21 Apr 1822') On 19 November 1811, Forward, commanded by Bankes, captured the merchant vessel Fortuna. (Note: December 26, 1812. Notice is hereby given, that Accounts of Sales of the following vessels, captured by His Majesty's gun-brig Forward, Richard Bankes, Esq, Commander, and condemned in the High Court of Admiralty, viz. Fortuna, captured 19, November 1811; Andred, captured 30th November 1811; Trende de Brodre and Karen Peders Datter, captured 19th March 1812; will be delivered into the Registry of the said Court. Thomas Maude and Sons, Agents) On 29 November, Bankes captured a Danish privateer.

In the early evening of 6 October 1813, Lieutenant Richard Bankes received intelligence that a Danish privateer of one gun was sailing towards an anchorage about four miles from Wingo Sound near Goteborg that English merchantmen were wont to use. Forward was in company with Barbara so when Bankes set out in a boat with six or seven men, Morgan joined him in a boat with an equal handful. The British found the Dane at about 9:15 pm. The Danish vessel was armed with a howitzer and had a crew of 25 men. The British succeeded in capturing the vessel, killing five Danes and wounding the captain, a lieutenant, in their attack; British losses consisted of two men killed and three wounded, including Morgan.

Forward departed Spithead anchorage on 2 December 1814 and arrived at Port Royal on 11 February 1815, having been part of a larger convoy of around 230 vessels with Swiftsure (1804) as its flagship. (Note: 'A fleet of about 230 sail, under convoy of the Swiftsure of 74 guns, Capt. Adderley... and the Forward brig, of 14 guns, Capt Banks[sic] [set sail from the Solent on 2 December 1814]... On the 1st inst. the fleet arrived off Barbados... The Forward [escorted] those [vessels destined] for this port [and arrived at Port Royal on 11 February 1815, as recorded on page 17.]') On 14 February, Forward, set sail from Port Royal, as it escorted the Boadicea and Dowson troop transports to the Mississippi. (Note: 'They proceeded on [14 February] Tuesday morning for their destination, under protection of the Forward brig, of 14 guns, Capt. Banks[sic].')

On 15 April 1815 she left Pensacola, and on 18 April, she moored at Apalachicola, Florida. Forward and two transports were the last remaining vessels in the vicinity of the British post at Prospect Bluff. On 16 May, they evacuated the last of the garrison there. Edward Nicolls, Woodbine, and the Redstick Creek leader Josiah Francis, arrived at Amelia Island, in East Florida on 7 June 1815, (Note: JUNE 10.-"It is proper your excellency [the Governor of Georgia] should know that on the 7th inst. a brig and transport arrived at Amelia Island, with col. Nichols, captain Woodbine; an Indian Chief, and his son.) where rumours circulated that the officers were seeking either to obtain British possession of Florida from Spain, or at least to arm and supply the Florida factions resisting American territorial expansion. (In fact, Nicolls had been heading to the Bahamas, and had unintentionally ended up in East Florida. (Note: A letter from Nicolls to Anthony St. John Baker, HM Chargé D'Affaires, Washington, dated 12 June 1815, written at Amelia Island, says "I had intended to write to you from the Bahamas ... but being obliged to put in here in distress.")) On 14 June she was off Fernandina. Forward arrived in Bermuda, and disembarked her passengers on 28 June. (Note: COL. NICOLLS:-It appears that this great man has left the Floridas for Bermuda, in the gun-brig Forward, accompanied by captain Woodbine; an indian chief and about 50 slave troops.) (Note: Seven Colonial Marines disembarked HMS Forward on 28 June 1815. The next day twenty seven Colonial Marines disembarked the transports Mars & Britannia on 29 June 1815, and were accommodated aboard HMS Ruby.) Edward Nicolls embarked on the Forward on 29 June 'for passage to England', and disembarked at Portsmouth on 13 August 1815. (Note: Portsmouth, Aug. 13:- The Forward, Lieut. BANKS[sic], arrived here yesterday from Pensacola, last from Bermuda, in 42 days. The Forward had [Mars and Britannia,] two transports under her convoy, with part of the marine artillery on board, from Pensacola, which she was obliged to leave up at Bermuda, to be hove down, in consequence of their being so leaky. Major Nicholls[sic], who had the command of the marine battalion serving in Florida, has come home in the Forward with an Indian Chief, who has greatly distinguished himself by assisting the British against the Americans, in that country.)

== Fate ==
In August 1815 Forward, along with Florida, Hope and Primrose were ordered to depart Portsmouth, and to sail to Woolwich, to be paid off. Ship logs for Forward were maintained up to 5 September 1815.

The "Principal Officers and Commissioners of His Majesty's Navy" offered the "Gun-brig Forward, of 179 tons", "lying at Woolwich" for sale on 14 December 1815. Forward was sold on that day for £600 for breaking up.
