= Swallow (1797 ship) =

History

Great Britain
- Name: Swallow
- Launched: 1793 in France
- Acquired: 1797 by purchase of a prize
- Fate: Unknown

General characteristics
- Tons burthen: 142, or 143 (bm)

Swallow was launched in France in 1793. After her capture circa 1797, she became a slave ship, sailing from London in the triangular trade in enslaved people. She first appeared in Lloyd's Register (LR) in 1797 with T. Wilson, master and owner, and trade Liverpool–Africa.

Captain Thomas Wilson sailed from London on 6 July 1797. In 1797, 104 vessels sailed from English ports, bound for Africa to acquire and transport enslaved people. Twelve of these vessels sailed from London.

Swallow acquired her captives at the Congo River and landed 218 captives at Grenada on 6 April 1798. She then disappears from currently available records.
