= HMS Spencer (1795) =

Sloop of the Royal Navy

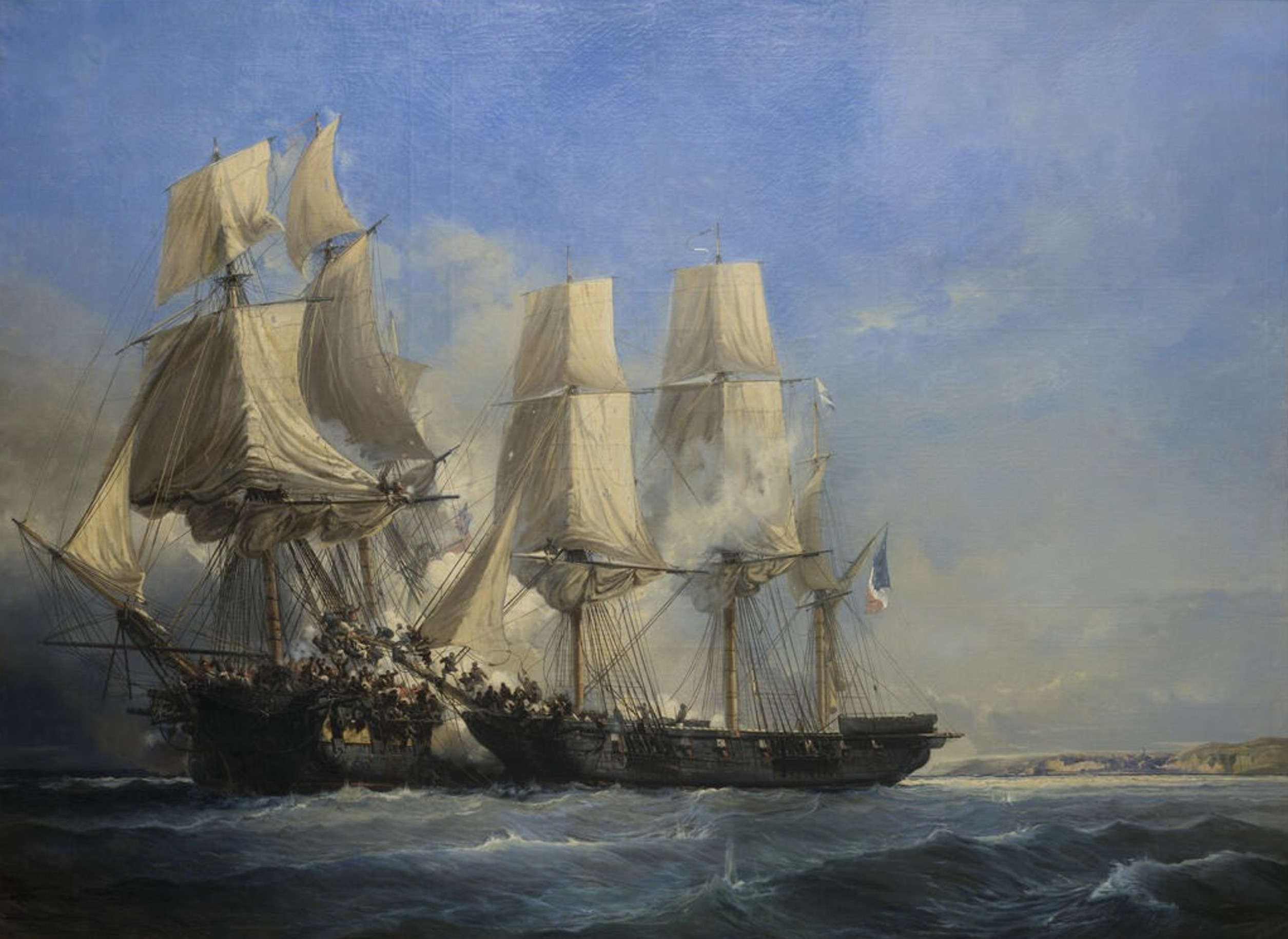
- Painting of Lilly (left) being captured by Dame Ambert on 14 July 1804

History

Great Britain
- Name: HMS Spencer
- Builder: Bermuda
- Acquired: By purchase in 1795
- Renamed: HMS Lilly in 1800
- Captured: 14 July 1804

France
- Name: Général Ernouf
- Acquired: By capture on 14 July 1804
- Fate: Destroyed by explosion in action in 1805

General characteristics
- Class & type: Brig-sloop or ship-sloop
- Tons burthen: 211 12/94 bm
- Length: 92 ft 6 in (28.2 m) (overall); 72 ft 0 in (21.9 m) (keel)
- Beam: 22 ft 11 in (7.0 m)
- Depth of hold: 12 ft 0 in (3.7 m)
- Sail plan: Three-masted sloop
- Complement: British service:121; Privateer: 129 sailors + 31 soldiers (when lost)
- Armament: British service: 14 × 12-pounder carronades + 2 × 4-pounder bow chasers; Privateer:18 × 12-pounder carronades + 2 × 4-pounder bow chasers

HMS Spencer was a 16-gun brig-sloop of the Royal Navy, which was launched as the merchantman Sir Charles Grey. The Admiralty purchased her in 1795, after having hired her from 1793 to 1794, and renamed her HMS Lilly in 1800. (Note: The spelling varies between Lily and Lilly. Colledge uses Lily. Winfield uses Lilly.) The French privateer Dame Ambert captured her in 1804 and Lilly became the privateer Général Ernouf. She blew up in 1805 while in an engagement with HMS Renard.

== Origins ==
On 11 August 1795 Captain Francis Pender arrived at Bermuda. Shortly thereafter he purchased two vessels, one of which became Bermuda and the other of which was the Sir Charles Grey, which he renamed Spencer. Sir Charles Grey had been a privateer and for a while a hired armed vessel, and was named for Charles Grey, 1st Earl Grey. Commander Thomas Hurd, of Bermuda, commissioned her, but he had been engaged in hydrographic survey work and Pender replaced him in Spencer with Lieutenant Andrew F. Evans.

== Career ==
On 4 May 1796 Spencer was sailing in company with Esperance and Bonetta when they sighted a suspicious vessel. Spencer set off in chase while shortly thereafter Esperance saw two vessels, a schooner and a sloop, and she and Bonetta set off after them. Spencer sailed south-southeast and the other two British vessels sailed southwest by west, with the result that they lost sight of each other. Spencer captured the French gun-brig Volcan, (Note: Volcan had been launched at Lorient in 1793 as a brig-rigged gunboat armed with only one 18-pounder gun. However, when the French Navy sent her overseas they armed her instead with twelve 4-pounder guns. Originally she had a crew of 38 men, later increased to 80.) while Bonetta and Esperance captured the schooner Poisson Volant.

Spencer shared with Bonetta and Esperance in the prize money for "Poisson Volant". Similarly, Esperance and Bonetta shared with Spencer in the proceeds of the capture of Volcan.

Commander J. Dunbar replaced Evans in August 1798, and remained in command until November 1798. His replacement was J. Walton.

Around September 1799, Joseph Spear was promoted to Commander and became captain of Lily, on the Halifax station. (Note: This information comes from a later biographical note and may represent anachronism .)

On 10 May 1800 the Royal Navy launched the 74-gun third rate Spencer. To avoid having two vessels with the same name, the brig-sloop Spencer became Lilly.

In May 1801 Lilly was in the Bahamas, still under Spear, and a year later she was at Halifax, on the Halifax station. The Lieutenant Governor of Nova Scotia, Sir John Wentworth, had requested that the navy station a vessel there "in the season" to interrupt the contraband trade by American vessels. Spear transferred from Lilly in 1802.

Commander William Compton replaced Spear in December 1802. In August 1803 Lilly was under the command of Randall McDonnell.

On 27 February 1804, Lilly, under Captain William Lyall, were at Halifax where Lyall had to draw a bill of exchange to pay the expenses of boats and crews serving the ship. Lilly was on her way to Bermuda when on 1 March she captured the Batavian schooner Draak near Bermuda. Draak was armed with four 4-pounder guns and one long 3-pounder gun, and had a crew of 50 men under the command of a "lieutenant of frigate" Jan Justus Dingemans. She was seven weeks out of Curaçoa but had not taken anything. Lyall reported that the engagement lasted 15 minutes and that Draak made preparations to board Lilly, but then struck. The engagement resulted in a marine on Lilly losing his arm, and in the death of two men on Draak, and one wounded. Lyall described Draak as a four-year-old Bermuda-built vessel, coppered, and a remarkably fast sailer. After Lyall, Lilly again came under Compton's command.

== Capture ==
Lily was off the coast of Georgia in the afternoon of 14 July 1804 when she sighted two vessels. She sailed towards them but by sunset was only able to determine that one was a ship and the other a smaller vessel, possibly the larger vessel's prize. In the morning the larger vessel could be seen towing the smaller. As Lilly approached, the larger vessel dropped her tow and sailed to engage Lilly.

The enemy vessel proceeded to stay by Lilly's stern and to use her long guns at ranges Lilly's carronades could not match. The fire from the enemy vessel killed Compton and so damaged Lilly's rigging that she lost her ability to manoeuvre. Seeing that the enemy vessel was preparing to board, Lieutenant Samuel Fowler, who was now in command, wanted to surrender, but the warrant officers objected. As the two vessels came alongside Lily was finally able to fire a broadside, which the French returned, and French fire killed Fowler. The British repelled several French attempts to board but eventually the French prevailed. Lilly's casualties were Compton and Fowler killed, and 16 men wounded.

The French vessel was Dame Ambert, a privateer of 16 guns. Dame Ambert had been the British packet Marlborough (or Marlboro, Duke of Marlborough, or General Marlborough), prior to her capture.

The French put their British prisoners onto a prize vessel and sent them into Hampton Roads. Once in America, a number of the British seamen deserted.

== French privateer ==
Her captors had Lilly fitted out as a privateer and renamed Général Ernouf for Jean Augustin Ernouf, governor of Guadeloupe. Giraud Lapointe took command.

On 1 July 1804 Général Ernouf encountered the British letter of marque Britannia, which was under the command of Captain D. Leavey, but did not engage. Four days later the two again sighted each other, and again the French vessel did not engage. However, one month later, on 5 August, Général Ernouf encountered Britannia, and this time, sensing an easy capture as her quarry appeared unready, came alongside and attempted to board. The two vessels exchanged both cannon and small arms fire, with Britannia twice repulsing boarding attempts. After the engagement left both vessels with severely damaged masts and rigging, Général Ernouf withdrew, with Britannia in pursuit; however, Britannia lost her attacker in the dark after night fell. Britannia had one man killed (a passenger who volunteered his services), and four wounded, Leavey among them.

On 14 August the frigate Galatea attempted to cut out Général Ernouf, which was sheltering at the Saintes near Guadeloupe where shore batteries could protect her. The attack was a debacle for the British, who failed completely in their attempt. Galatea's captain, Henry Heathcote, had been too obvious in his reconnoitering and the French were waiting for the night attack. In all, the British lost some 10 men killed, including Lieutenant Charles Hayman (the commander of the boarding party and first lieutenant of Galatea), and 55 or more wounded or captured. The French lost four killed and suffered some wounded, among them Captain Lapointe, commander of Général Ernouf, and Lieutenant Mouret, commander of the detachment of troops the French stationed aboard her in anticipation of the attack. The French also captured Galatea's barge, which the other three boats of the cutting out party could not retrieve as they made their escape.

== Destruction ==
On 20 March 1805 HMS Renard was at 21°14′N 71°30′W when she sighted a ship to the north-west. Renard gave chase and as she approached, her quarry shortened sail and made ready to engage. At 2:20 p.m., Renard opened fire. After 35 minutes, the French vessel appeared to be on fire, and ten minutes later she exploded. Renard lowered a boat and was able to rescue 55 men, all the rest of the 160 men aboard the French vessel having perished. The survivors reported that their vessel was the Général Ernouf. She had been under the command of Paul Giraud-Lapointe, and was seven days out of Basseterre. She had intended to intercept the homeward-bound Jamaica fleet. Prior to the explosion, Général Ernouf had 20-30 men killed and wounded; Renard had only nine wounded.
