= Harriot (1806 ship) =

19th century ship

History

United Kingdom
- Name: Harriot
- Builder: America
- Launched: 1803
- Acquired: Circa 1806
- Captured: 1808

General characteristics
- Tons burthen: 205 (bm)
- Armament: 4 × 4-pounder guns + 12 × 12-pounder carronades

Harriot (or Harriet) was launched in America in 1803, possibly under another name. In 1806 she made a voyage as a slave ship. In 1807 she started a second such voyage, one of the last legal such voyages, but a French privateer captured her before she could deliver to the British West Indies the slaves she had acquired.

Harriot first appeared in Lloyd's Register (LR) in 1806.

Year	Master	Owner	Trade	Source
1806	J.Woodrick	Shaw & Co.	Liverpool–Africa	LR

1st slave voyage (1806–1807): Captain John Woolrich sailed from Liverpool on 20 February 1806, bound for Lagos Onim. After having acquired her slaves, Harriot stopped in at Prince's Island. She arrived at Demerara on 3 October 1806 with 240 slaves. The 240 slaves were offered for sale on 11 October. Captain P. Stuart replaced Woolrich at some point, and she arrived at Demerara under Stuart's command. Harriot cleared outbound on 12 December and sailed from Demerara on 20 December under the command of Captain Peter Stewart. She arrived back at Liverpool on 16 February 1807. She had left Liverpool with 34 crew members and she suffered nine crew deaths on her voyage.

The Act for the abolition of the slave trade had passed Parliament in March 1807 and took effect on 1 May 1807. However, apparently Harriot had received clearance to sail before the deadline. Thus, when she sailed on 9 July, she did so legally. (The last vessel to sail legally was Kitty's Amelia, which sailed on 27 July, having received clearance to sail on 28 April.)

2nd slave voyage (1807–capture): Captain James Irwin sailed from Liverpool on 9 July 1807, bound for Loango. In February 1808 or so, the privateer Général Ernouf captured Harriot, as Harriet was sailing from Africa to the West Indies, and possibly sent her into Cayenne.

The LR volume for 1809 carried the annotation "captured" beneath her name.
