= Jean Augustin Ernouf =

French Army officer, colonial administrator and politician

Jean Auguste Ernouf
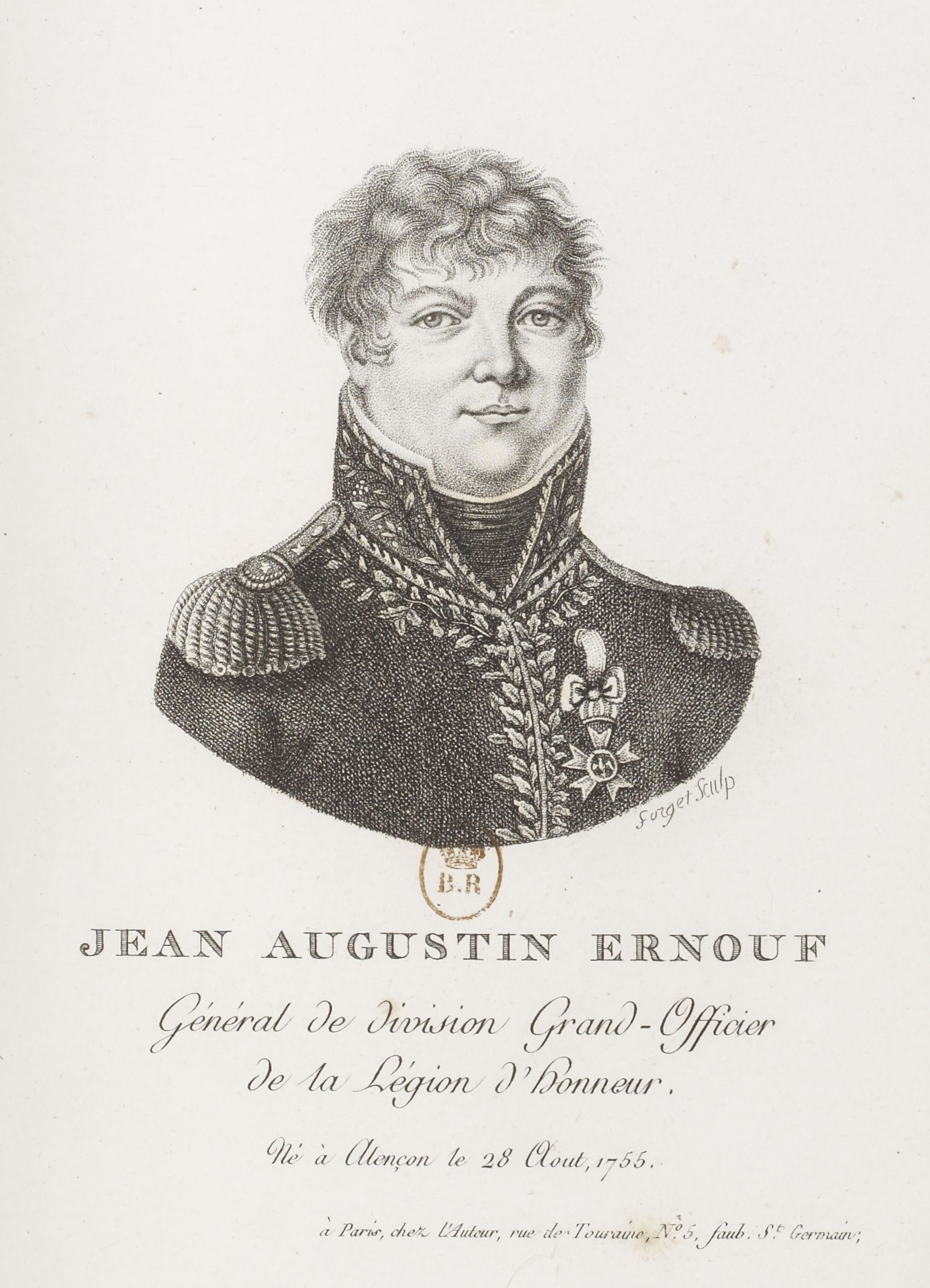
- Portrait by Constance Mayer, 1810
- Born: 29 August 1753; Alençon, Normandy
- Died: 12 September 1827 (aged 74) Paris, France
- Allegiance: Kingdom of France; French First Republic; First French Empire
- Branch: French Royal Army; French Revolutionary Army; French Imperial Army
- Service years: 1791–1823
- Rank: Divisional general
- Conflicts: War of the First Coalition; Battle of Hondshoote; Siege of Dunkirk (1793); Battle of Wattignies; Battle of Fleurus (1794); War of the Second Coalition; Battle of Ostrach; Battle of Stockach (1799); First Battle of Zurich; Second Battle of Zurich; Invasion of Guadeloupe (1810) (surrendered)
- Awards: 1804: Grand Officer, Légion d'honneur 1814: Chevalier of Saint-Louis
- Other work: 1818: Chamber of Deputies (elected by Department of the Moselle)

Divisional-General Manuel Louis Jean Augustin Ernouf (29 August 1753 – 12 September 1827) was a French Army officer, colonial administrator and politician who served in the French Revolutionary and Napoleonic Wars. He demonstrated moderate abilities as a combat commander; his real strength lay in his organizational and logistical talents. He held several posts as chief-of-staff and in military administration.

In 1791, Ernouf enlisted in the French Royal Army as a private; in September 1793, he was promoted to brigade general in the newly formed French Revolutionary Army. Ernouf and his commanding officer were accused of being counter-revolutionaries, disgraced, and then, in 1794 restored to their former ranks. In 1804, Napoleon appointed him as the governor of Guadeloupe following the restoration of direct French rule and slavery in the colony. Although he was able to reestablish order and agricultural production through brutal methods, the British invaded the colony in 1810 and after a brief engagement forced him to capitulate.

Ernouf returned to France on a prisoner exchange, but was charged with treason by Napoleon, who was enraged with the loss of Guadeloupe. Before he could be exonerated by a court, the First French Empire fell in 1814; with the Bourbon Restoration in France, he retained his honors, and received command of the III Corps in Marseille. Following the Second Bourbon Restoration, he held an administrative position in one of the occupation zones, and later he was elected to the Chamber of Deputies of France.

== Early life ==
Manuel Louis Jean Augustin Ernouf was born in Alençon, Normandy on 29 August 1753. After completing school, Ernouf joined the French Royal Army as a private. He was commissioned as a lieutenant of infantry in the 1st Battalion of Volunteers of the Orne on the 24 September 1791, and as a captain on 22 March 1792, and 5 May 1793 he became an aide-de-camp of General Barthel's Army of the North. On 30 July 1793, he was promoted to the rank of lieutenant colonel.

== Flanders campaign ==
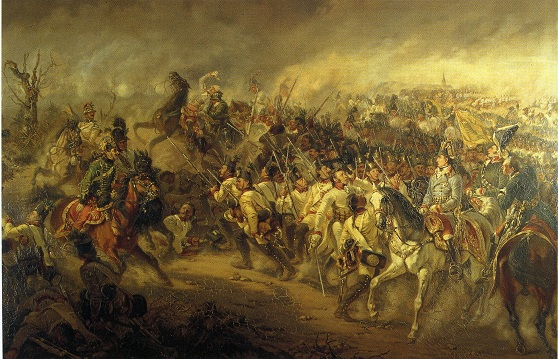
The Battle of Stockach, which Ernouf fought in

In 1793, during the War of the First Coalition, Ernouf was sent to Cassel to strengthen the French position. The Duke of York laid siege to Dunkirk and blockaded the town of Bergues, on the Belgian border, which had insufficient garrison to fend off the British. Ernouf assembled a force of a thousand men and joined Jean Nicolas Houchard; together they marched to the relief of Dunkirk. Once there, he led a column in attack on the British camp. On 5 complémentaire an I (21 September 1793), which would have been the last day of the first year of the new Republic, he was raised to the rank of brigadier general and was appointed on 9 vendémiaire an II (30 September 1793) as chief of staff to the Army of the North.

It was also by his advice that the commander-in-chief, Jean-Baptiste Jourdan, discovered Josias, Prince of Coburg's unfortunate position behind the Wattignies forest, compelled him to retreat across the Sambre and subsequently lifted the siege of Maubeuge: Ernouf's part in this action, the Battle of Hondschoote, earned him his promotion to major general on 23 frimaire an II (13 December 1793). When Jourdan did not order an aggressive pursuit, both he and Ernouf were recalled by the Committee of Public Safety in disgrace. He was suspended on suspicion of being a counter-revolutionary, but reinstated upon the end of the Reign of Terror in 1795. Upon his reinstatement, he was appointed chief of staff of the Army of the Moselle and the Army of Sambre-et-Meuse. He held several administrative posts, including a stint in which he helped to develop the topographical and geographical military maps.

== Service in Swabia and Switzerland ==
In 1798, Jourdan appointed him as chief of staff for the Army of Observation. Ernouf was with the Army of Observation when it crossed the Rhine in a violation of the Treaty of Campo Formio, resulting in the War of the Second Coalition. On 2 March, the Army was renamed Army of the Danube, and it marched to Upper Swabia, where it engaged Archduke Charles' Habsburg force at Ostrach on 21 March, and again on 25 March at Stockach. In both battles, the Habsburg manpower, superior to the French numbers by three to one and two to one respectively, overwhelmed the French lines; Jourdan, the commander of the Army, was unable to concentrate his forces sufficiently to counteract the Habsburg numbers, and withdrew to the Black Forest in late March. Ernouf took command of the Army of the Danube while Jourdan returned to Paris to request more troops. He was replaced as commander of the Army of the Danube by André Masséna, and served as Massena's chief of staff in the Swiss campaign of 1799, during which he saw action in Zurich and central Switzerland; he was again at Zurich for the French victory over Alexander Rimsky-Korsakov.

== Governor of Guadeloupe ==
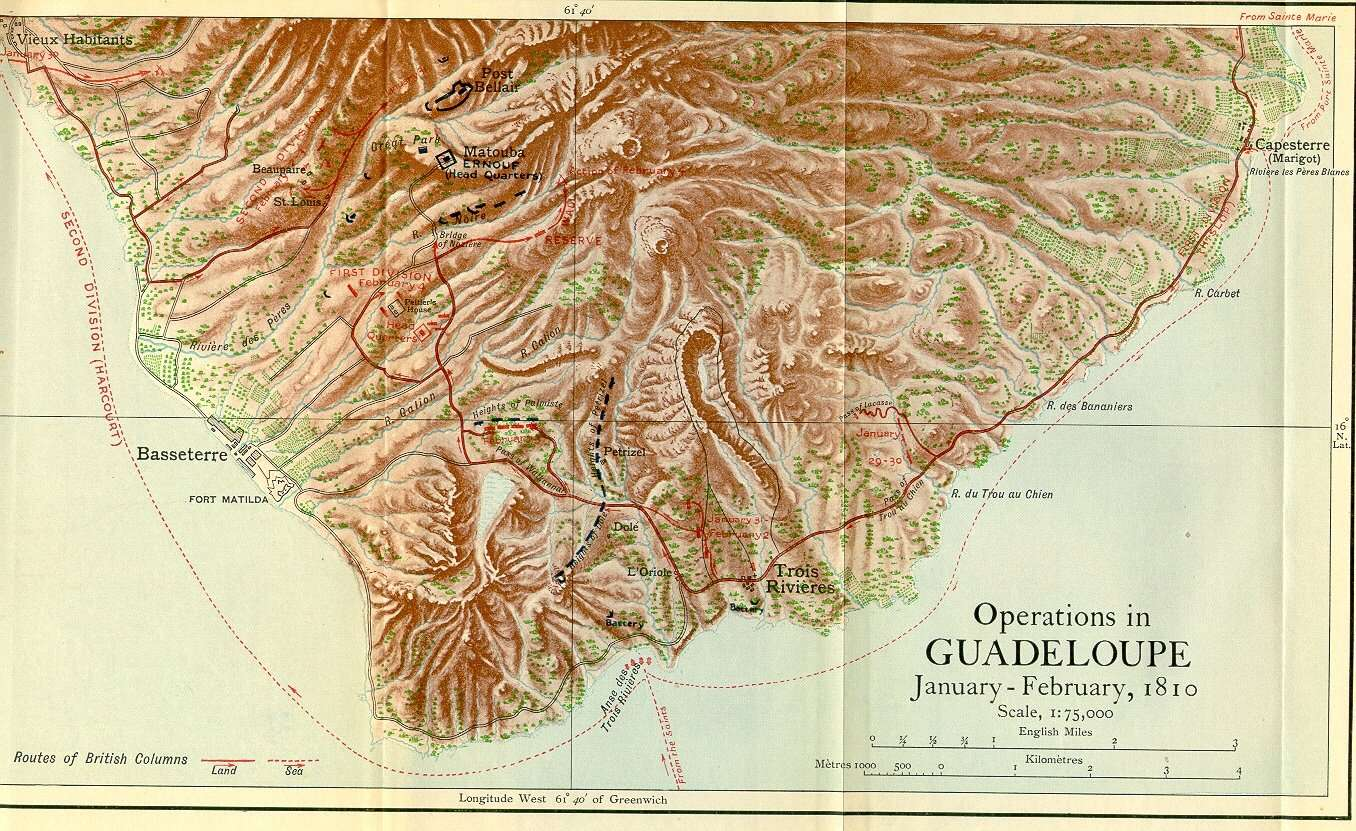
A map of the British invasion of Guadeloupe in 1810

In 1804, Ernouf became a Grand Officer of the Legion of Honor. Shortly afterward, he was sent to Guadeloupe as the new governor of the colony, charged with restoring order in the wake of an 1802 rebellion by Magloire Pélage and Louis Delgrès against the reintroduction of direct French rule and slavery. Within a year, Ernouf had fully restored slavery in Guadeloupe along with colony's productivity through waves of brutal repression. In contrast, he generously treated white planters who returned to Guadeloupe. Ernouf also ordered the occupation of the nearby Swedish colony of Saint Barthélemy, whose inhabitants traded with Haiti, which had recently gained independence from French rule as a result of the Haitian Revolution.

Ernouf's task was complicated by the British declaration of war on France in 1803, which initiated the Napoleonic Wars. To protect Guadeloupe, he ordered the construction of several coastal batteries around the colony's shores. There is evidence to suggest that he either encouraged French privateering against British and American shipping; British officers later found letters of marque allegedly signed by Ernouf to privateers. Four French privateers operating out of Guadeloupe between 1805 and 1810 were named Général Ernouf, one of which was the captured sloop-of-war HMS Lilly. In 1808, British forces captured Marie-Galante as part of the Caribbean campaign of 1803–1810. Ernouf subsequently ordered an attack against the island after hearing that disease had weakened the British garrison there. Black slaves in Marie-Galante agreed to assist the British in exchange for their freedom, and the French attack was repulsed.

The British capture of Martinique in 1809 led the French situation in Guadeloupe to become critical; due to the Royal Navy's effective blockade, the French troops and civilians on Guadeloupe were reduced to near starvation. In January 1810, the British invaded Guadeloupe; Rear-admiral Sir Alexander Cochrane oversaw the landing of 11,000 British troops under Lieutenant-general George Beckwith on the island's eastern side at Capesterre-Belle-Eau. Attacked on three sides at the end of January 1810, Ernouf's troops mounted a spirited yet brief defense and capitulated on 6 February 1810, after which he was transported to Britain. Ernouf was repatriated to France in a prisoner exchange in 1811. Angered at the loss of Guadeloupe to the British, Napoleon accused Ernouf of abuse of power, embezzlement and treason. He spent 23 months in prison while French courts debated how to proceed.

== Bourbon Restoration ==
At the Bourbon Restoration, Louis XVIII suspended the proceedings against him for lack of evidence and Ernouf entered into Bourbon service. He was created Chevalier of Saint-Louis, on 20 August of that year, and he was appointed Inspector General of Infantry. On 3 January 1815, he went in that capacity in Marseille. In March 1815, he received a command in the 1st Corps, under the general command of Charles, Duke of Angoulême.

Ernouf was on an inspection away from this command when Napoleon landed at Cannes. Upon his landing, many of the soldiers of Angoulême's army flocked to Bonaparte's banner, beginning the Hundred Days. The mere news of Napoleon's escape from Elba and the defection of some of the troops caused Charles, Duke of Angoulême, to panic and capitulate. Ernouf returned to Marseille, where he learned that André Masséna also had chosen the imperial cause, after which he left for Paris. Napoleon rescinded Ernouf's honors and titles, and dismissed him from his post in the military on 15 April 1815. After Napoleon's final defeat at the Battle of Waterloo, the second restoration of the Bourbons that summer also restored Ernouf's rights and property.

== Later life and death ==
On 3 May 1816, Louis XVIII granted him the title of Baron with the Commander's Cross of the Order of Saint Louis, which entitled him to wear a red sash (right shoulder to left hip); he automatically received a pension, and hereditary nobility was granted to the son and grandson of knights. On 11 November 1816, Enrouf received command of the III Division, located at Metz, which was occupied by Allied troops as a condition of the Second Treaty of Paris; his role was to maintain harmony between residents and the foreign soldiers.

Elected by the Moselle, in 1816, he obtained in 1818 permission to sit in the Chamber of Deputies, and left the command of the III Division when he became eligible for retirement on 22 July 1822. He died in Paris on 12 September 1827.

== Family ==
Ernouf was married to Geneviève Miloent (d. 22 November 1822). Ernouf's son, Gaspard Augustin (8 December 1777 – 25 October 1848), was also a military commander during the French Revolutionary and Napoleonic Wars. Gaspard and his wife, Adelaïde Guesdon, were the parents of the 19th century historian, Alfred Auguste Ernouf (1816–1889).

== Sources ==
=== References ===
- Adkins, Roy and Lesley. War for all the Oceans. New York. Penguin, 2008, 978-0143113928.
- Blanning, Timothy. The French Revolutionary Wars. New York: Oxford University Press, 1996. ISBN 0-340-56911-5.
- Blaufarb, Rafe (ed.). "Pierre-Louis Roederer, Speech Proposing the Creation of a Legion of Honour". Napoleon: Symbol for an Age, A Brief History with Documents. New York: Bedford/St. Martin's, 2008.
- Dodge, Theodore Ayrault. Napoleon: A History of the Art of War. vol. 3, Boston: Houghton Mifflin Co, 1904.
- (in French) Etat civil reconstitué 1798–1860: Mariages, naissances, décès. Paris: ARFIDO S.A., 2006.
- Jourdan, Jean-Baptiste. A Memoir of the operations of the army of the Danube under the command of General Jourdan, taken from the manuscripts of that officer. London: Debrett, 1799.
- Mullié, Charles (1852). "Ernouf (Gaspard-Augustin)" . Biographie des célébrités militaires des armées de terre et de mer de 1789 à 1850 (in French). Paris: Poignavant et Compagnie.
- Mullié, Charles (1852). "Ernouf (Jean-Augustin, baron)" . Biographie des célébrités militaires des armées de terre et de mer de 1789 à 1850 (in French). Paris: Poignavant et Compagnie.
- Phipps, Ramsey Weston. The Armies of the First French Republic, volume 5: The armies of the Rhine in Switzerland, Holland, Italy, Egypt and the coup d'état of Brumaire, 1797–1799. Oxford: Oxford University Press, 1939.
- Smith, Digby, The Greenhill Napoleonic Wars Data Book: Actions and Losses in Personnel, Colours, Standards and Artillery, 1792–1815. Greenhill, Pennsylvania: Stackpole, 1998, ISBN 1-85367-276-9.
- Warner, Charles Dudley (ed.). "Alfred Auguste Ernouf." Biographical Dictionary and Synopsis of Books Ancient and Modern. Akron, Ohio: Werner, 1902.

=== External links and sources ===
- "Charles Victor Emmanuel Leclerc". The Louverture Project. Archived from the original on 6 August 2016.
- "Notice no. LH 901/17". Base Léonore (in French).
