= HMS Dreadnought (1801) =

Ship of the line of the Royal Navy

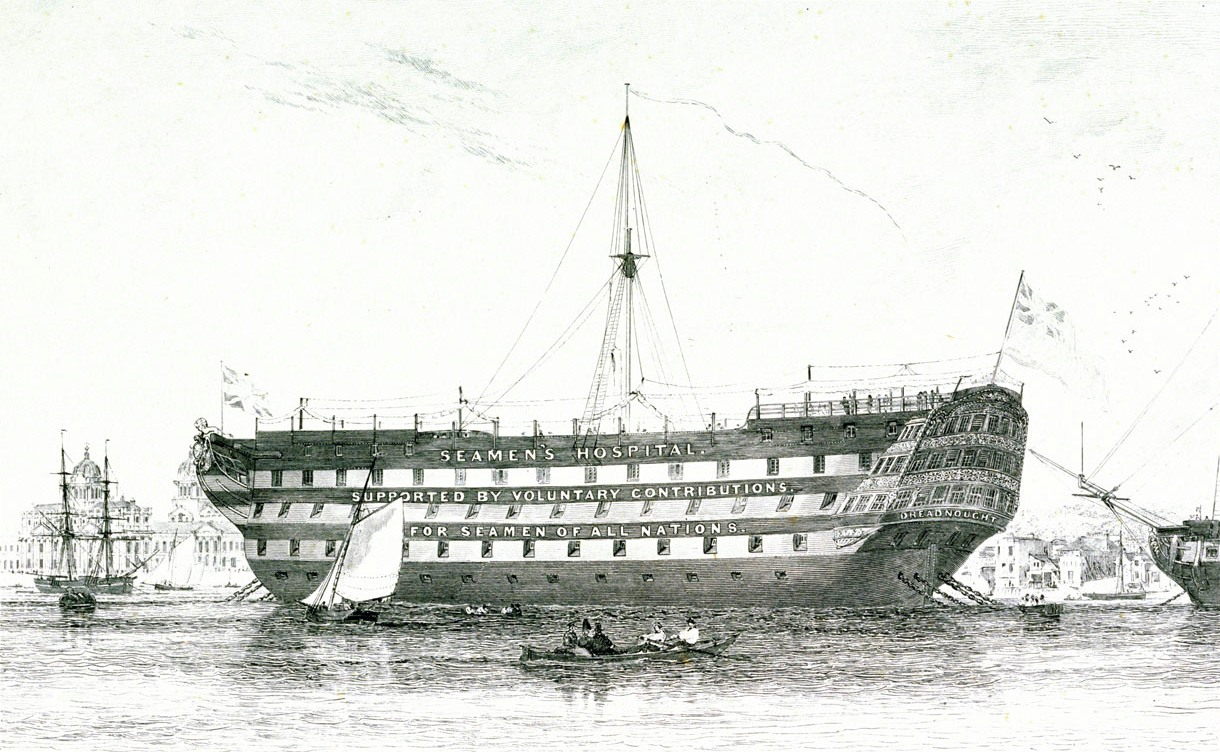
- Dreadnought as a quarantine ship, mid-1800s

History

United Kingdom
- Name: Dreadnought
- Ordered: 17 January 1788
- Builder: Portsmouth Dockyard
- Laid down: July 1788
- Launched: 13 June 1801
- Fate: Broken up, 1857
- Notes: Participated in: Battle of Trafalgar

General characteristics
- Class & type: Neptune-class ship of the line
- Tons burthen: 2,110 (bm)
- Length: 185 ft (56 m) (gundeck)
- Beam: 51 ft (16 m)
- Depth of hold: 21 ft (6.4 m)
- Propulsion: Sails
- Sail plan: Full-rigged ship
- Armament: Gundeck: 28 × 32-pounder guns; Middle gundeck: 30 × 18-pounder guns; Upper gundeck: 30 × 18-pounder guns; Quarterdeck: 8 × 12-pounder guns; Forecastle: 2 × 12-pounder guns

HMS Dreadnought was a Royal Navy 98-gun second rate. This ship of the line was launched at Portsmouth at midday on Saturday, 13 June 1801, after she had spent 13 years on the stocks. She was the first man-of-war launched since the Act of Union 1800 created the United Kingdom of Great Britain and Ireland, and at her head displayed a lion couchant on a scroll bearing the Royal arms as emblazoned on the Standard.

== Launch ==
The launch was a spectacle; it was reported that at least 10,000 people witnessed Commissioner Sir Charles Saxton break a bottle of wine over her stem, and that after the launch Sir Charles gave a most sumptuous cold collation to the nobility and officers of distinction.

After the launch, Dreadnought was brought into dock for coppering, and a great number of people went on board to view her. The following day, due to the exertions of Mr Peake, the builder, and the artificers of the dockyard, she was completely coppered in six hours and on Monday morning she went out of dock for rigging and fitting.

== Active service ==
Her first commander was Captain James Vashon. After cruising for some time in the Channel he proceeded off Cádiz and Menorca where he continued until the summer of 1802.

Her first master was Mr. Banks followed by Joseph Foss Dessiou (1769–1853), who was paid off on 15 July 1802.

In 1803, Captain Edward Brace briefly took command as flag captain to William Cornwallis, until he was relieved that same year by Captain John Child Purvis.

Purvis served under the orders of Admiral Cornwallis until he was promoted to rear-admiral in April 1804. The next commander until August was Robert Carthew Reynolds. He was superseded that month by George Reynolds, who, in turn, was replaced in December that year by Edward Rotheram, who stayed as flag captain to Admiral Cuthbert Collingwood until just before Trafalgar. The winter gale weather off the French coast badly damaged five of the major warships maintaining the blockade. Dreadnought lost most of her powder when water poured into the magazine.

In the spring of 1805, Admiral Cornwallis was replaced by an ailing Lord Gardner who allowed the close blockade to be slackened. On 30 March the French fleet escaped from Toulon and reached Cádiz on 9 April. The French and Spanish squadrons sailed separately from there and joined forces in Martinique on 26 May. On 15 May, Collingwood and his squadron of seven ships received orders from the Admiralty to sail for Barbados. Before they could depart; however, Horatio Nelson arrived from the Mediterranean Sea in pursuit of the French, and Dreadnought proceeded to Cádiz for Collingwood to command a close blockade there.

On 12 June she removed 3 sailors who claimed to be English from USS Gunboat No. 6 off Cadiz.

Early in October 1805, Captain John Conn assumed command of Dreadnought, after having brought Royal Sovereign out from England for Vice-Admiral Collingwood. Collingwood and Rotheram then moved to the newly recoppered first rate on 10 October 1805, leaving Conn in command of the now sluggish Dreadnought, with her barnacled hull badly in need of careening, but nevertheless with a well exercised ship's company, who for months having been under Collingwood's watchful eye, now contained the most efficient gun crews in the fleet.

At the Battle of Trafalgar on 21 October 1805, Dreadnought was the eighth ship in the lee division to enter the action. She started firing on San Juan Nepomuceno at two o'clock and fifteen minutes later ran her on board and forced her to surrender after her commander Commodore Cosme Damian de Churruca y Elorza had been killed in action. She then attempted to engage Principe de Asturias but the Spanish ship hauled off. During the battle Dreadnought lost seven killed and 26 wounded.

After Trafalgar, Dreadnought continued in the blockade of Cadiz. On 25 November, Thunderer detained the Ragusan ship Nemesis, which was sailing from Isle de France to Leghorn, Italy, with a cargo of spice, indigo dye, and other goods. Dreadnought shared the prize money with ten other British warships.

Dreadnought continued to patrol the Channel and the Baltic for another seven years.

In 1807, under Captain William Lechmere, she was part of the Channel Fleet. From 1808 to 1809, she was under Captain G. B. Salt, serving as the flagship of Rear-Admiral Thomas Sotheby, off Ushant.

On 9 November Dreadnought, Gibraltar, Christian VII, Milford, Naiad, Unicorn, and the hired armed cutters Nimrod and Adrian were all in sight when the Ballahoo class schooner Snapper captured the French brig Modeste.

On 7 September 1810 Snapper spotted a ship among the rocks on the west side of Ushant. She notified Dreadnought, which attempted a cutting out expedition. The British succeeded in taking the Spanish merchant brig Maria-Antonia, which had been taken by a French privateer. However, the success was bought at a cost of six dead, 31 wounded and six missing, as well as two ship's boats, as a result of an ambush by a large party of French troops with two field guns on a cliff overlooking the anchorage.

In spring 1811, Dreadnought, under Captain Samuel Hood Linzee, was in Lisbon. She then was in the Baltic at the end of the year. On 16 December 1811, a fleet of about 150 merchant ships sailed from Wingo, near Gothenburg, under the escort of a number of ships, including Dreadnought. A gale resulted in the loss of St George and Defence but Dreadnought and the other ships arrived safely.

== Fate ==
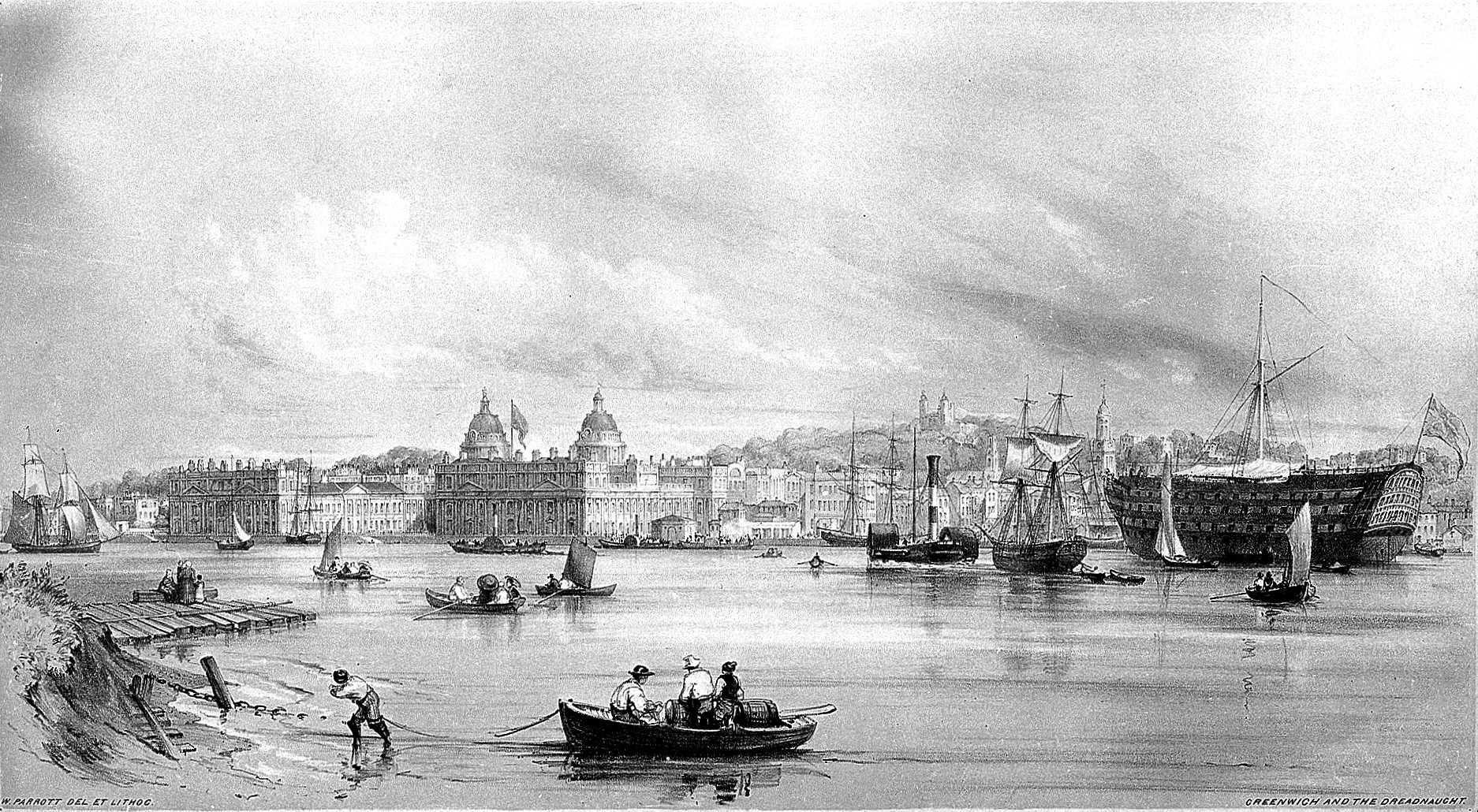
Dreadnought at Greenwich 1841 by William Parrott

Dreadnought was taken out of commission at Portsmouth in 1812. In 1827, she became a lazaretto (quarantine ship) at Milford on Sea and became the second of the ships used by the Seamen's Hospital Society, between 1831 and 1857, as a hospital ship for ex-members of the Merchant Navy or fishing fleet, and their dependents. Dreadnought was broken up in 1857.

== Land-based infirmary ==
When the Admiralty had Dreadnought broken up, it transferred the infirmary to the Caledonia, which was renamed Dreadnought. In 1870 the infirmary transferred onto land as the Seamen's Dreadnought Hospital at the Royal Greenwich Hospital. Since 1986, this has become the 'Dreadnought Unit' at St Thomas's Hospital. In addition, the Seamen's Dreadnought Hospital provided in 1919 the foundation for the UK's dedicated Hospital for Tropical Diseases. The Dreadnought (Hospital) Building at Greenwich is now part of the University of Greenwich and was redeveloped and reopened in 2018. The building hosts the Faculty of Education, Health and Human Sciences (FEHHS) and the Greenwich Students' Union along with student support services.
