= HMS Snapper (1805) =

History

United Kingdom
- Name: HMS Snapper
- Ordered: 23 June 1803
- Builder: Goodrich & Co. (prime contractor), Bermuda
- Laid down: 1803
- Launched: 1805
- Captured: By French lugger Angélique on 14 July 1811
- Fate: Unknown

General characteristics
- Type: Ballahoo-class schooner
- Tons burthen: 70 41/94 (bm)
- Length: 55 ft 2 in (16.8 m) (overall); 40 ft 10 1/2 in (12.5 m) (keel)
- Beam: 18 ft 0 in (5.5 m)
- Depth of hold: 9 ft 0 in (2.7 m)
- Sail plan: Schooner
- Complement: 20
- Armament: 4 × 12-pounder carronades

HMS Snapper was a Royal Navy Ballahoo-class schooner of four 12-pounder carronades and a crew of 20. The prime contractor for the vessel was Goodrich & Co., in Bermuda, and she was launched in 1804. She cruised for some seven years, sharing in several captures of merchant vessels and taking some herself, before a French privateer captured her.

== Service ==
In May 1804 she was commissioned under Lieutenant George Honey at Jamaica, and then on the Halifax station. In October 1806 she sailed in the Channel under Lieutenant William B. Champion. Then in May 1807 he sailed her to the Mediterranean.

On 13 April 1808 Sub-Lieutenant James Young underwent a court martial aboard Salvador del Mundo at Plymouth. One charge was conduct unbecoming an officer. Apparently he had smoked in the galley with the crew and "permitted liberties derogatory to the character of an officer". A second charge was that he had been absent without leave during a gale and had returned to the vessel intoxicated. The court martial severely reprimanded him. On 11 October the two schooners Snapper and Nonpareil were in company when Nonpareil captured the merchant schooner Belle Coquette.

In 1809 she was under Lieutenant William Jenkins. On 9 July Snapper was in company with the second rate Dreadnought, Tonnant, Gibraltar, and Minerva when they captured Goede Hoop. On 2 August the same squadron captured Carl Ludwig. On 9 November Snapper was in sight of Dreadnought, Gibraltar, Christian VII, Milford, Naiad, Unicorn, and the hired armed cutters Nimrod and Adrian when Snapper captured the French brig Modeste.

Snapper was also in company with Christian VII, Armide and Conflict when they captured the chasse maree Felicitée on 10 January 1810 and Glorieuse ten days later. On 16 February 1810 Snapper and Defiance were in company with Valiant when Valiant captured the chasse marees Heureux and Louisa. Next, on 2 June Unicorn was in sight of Valiant and the schooners Snapper and Arrow when Unicorn captured the chasse maree Marie Josef.

On 7 September 1810 Snapper spotted a ship among the rocks on the west side of Ushant. She notified Dreadnought, which attempted a cutting out expedition. The British succeeded in taking the Spanish merchant brig Maria-Antonia, which had been taken by a French privateer. However, the success was bought at a cost of six dead, 31 wounded, and six missing, as well as two ship's boats, as a result of an ambush by a large party of French troops with two field guns on a cliff overlooking the anchorage. Five days later, on 12 September, Snapper was in company with a squadron under the command of Rear Admiral Sir H.B. Neal when she captured the merchant vessel Sophie. Sophie (or Sophia), a galiot with a cargo of timber, reached Plymouth a few days later. The vessels sharing in the prize were Caledonia, Valiant, Piercer, Arrow, and the hired armed cutter Nimrod. Then, on 28 September, Snapper captured Aventura and San Nichola.

== Fate ==
Lieutenant Henry Thrakston took command of Snapper in January 1811. On 14 July the French lugger Rapace captured her off Les Sables-d'Olonne. French records agree on the date and location, but give the captor as the lugger Angélique, which was under the command of capitaine de frégate Guiné.

At daybreak Thrakston had sailed to intercept some French vessels that he thought were coasters but that turned out to be a lugger of seven guns, a brig of four guns, and four large pinnaces armed with swivel guns and manned by large numbers of men armed with small arms. A chase ensued with the vessels exchanging fire, until the wind failed and the French were able to approach using sweeps. Although Snapper had suffered no casualties, Thrakston surrendered as the pinnaces closed to board and after her rigging and sails were shot to pieces and she had lost her topmast.
