= John Conn =

Royal Navy officer (1764–1810)

Captain John Conn
- Born: c. 5 August 1764; Stoke Damerel, Devon
- Died: 10 May 1810 (aged 45); Off the coast of Bermuda
- Military career
- Allegiance: United Kingdom
- Branch: Royal Navy
- Service years: 1778–1810
- Rank: Captain
- Commands: HMS Staunch; HMS Discovery; HMS Culloden; HMS Canopus; HMS Victory; HMS Royal Sovereign; HMS Dreadnought; HMS San Josef; HMS Hibernia; HMS Swiftsure
- Conflicts: American Revolutionary War; French Revolutionary Wars; Napoleonic Wars

Captain John Conn (c. 5 August 1764 – 4 May 1810) was a senior captain in the Royal Navy, whose career, which included service at the battles of the Saintes, the Glorious First of June, Copenhagen and Trafalgar, ended in a shipboard accident before he could reap the rewards of his long service. Conn could also claim membership of Nelson's "Band of Brothers", a clique of dashing naval officers who participated in Nelson's campaigns during the French Revolutionary and Napoleonic Wars, as well as a close friendship with the admiral himself, who once said: "A better or more zealous officer than Captain Conn is not in His Majesty's service."

== Biography ==
Born to a Royal Navy warrant officer of Irish extraction, also named John Conn, he was baptised at Stoke Damerel, Devon, on 5 August 1764. Conn first went to sea in 1778, aged thirteen, aboard on his father's ship Weazel, before securing a place on Arrogant as a midshipman, and in which he saw action at the battle of the Saintes in April 1782. In 1788 he was made a lieutenant, but had to wait five years before being given a good position, using the intervening time to marry Margaret Nelson, a vicar's daughter. Serving aboard the flagship Royal Sovereign at the Glorious First of June, he came to the attention of Admiral Lord Howe. He commissioned the 12-gun gun vessel Staunch in June 1797 but left her a year later. He then further distinguished himself in October 1798 in Foudroyant at the battle of Donegal, which resulted in the destruction of a French invasion fleet headed for Ireland. He was promoted to commander on 11 August 1800 and took command of the bomb vessel Discovery. At the first battle of Copenhagen his expertise caused terrible damage to the Danish fleet. Next, he participated in Nelson's bold but disastrous attack on the French invasion force in Boulogne shortly afterwards, commanding the division of gun-boats, and gaining his commanding officer's attention and respect.

Conn received promotion to post-captain on 29 August 1802 and took command of Culloden. His nine-year-old son Henry joined him on Culloden. Conn then transferred to the French prize Canopus and joined Nelson in the Mediterranean at Nelson's request. In 1805 Conn was given temporary command of the first rate flagship Victory and his old ship Royal Sovereign whilst their commanders were on leave; his performance further contributed to his reputation as a reliable and steady officer. On 10 October he returned the Royal Sovereign to Admiral Collingwood and took command of the fast new second rate Dreadnought.

Eleven days later Conn and his crew were thrown into battle as the Franco-Spanish fleet attempted to break out of Cádiz. Situated halfway down Collingwood's division, Conn struggled to reach the action, only getting there around the time Nelson was mortally wounded in the northern division. Making up for the delay, Dreadnought tangled with the San Juan Nepomuceno, rescuing the battered Bellerophon, killing the Spanish captain Cosmé Damián Churruca and forcing his ship to surrender. Charging on from this victory, the Dreadnought engaged the Spanish flagship Principe de Asturias, mortally wounding the Spanish admiral Gravina, but being unable to defeat the enemy, which succeeded in escaping back to Cádiz. Conn even managed to rescue his prize, the San Juan Nepomuceno being one of only four captured enemy ships to survive the storm.

Following the battle, in which Dreadnought suffered 33 casualties, Conn continued in service taking over the massive 112 gun San Josef and then the 120 gun Hibernia as flag captain before moving as a commodore to the West Indies in Swiftsure in 1810. Admiral's rank and the honours which came with it were surely not far away when tragedy struck on 4 May when during the chase of a small French ship near Bermuda, Conn became over-eager, slipped and fell overboard. Swiftsure was halted and a search was conducted, but Conn had drowned before help arrived. His death was mourned in Britain and especially in the Navy where he was a popular and respected figure. Sir John Borlase Warren, an old commander and friend, expressed regret at the death of "so deserving an officer as Captain Conn."
