= Hired armed cutter Adrian =

Two vessels named His Majesty's Hired armed cutter Adrian served the British Royal Navy during the Napoleonic Wars as hired armed vessels.

== First Adrian ==
The first Adrian was the cutter Industry, of 8415/94 tons (bm). She was armed with eight 12-pounder carronades. She served under contract from 21 August 1804 to 25 August 1805. During her service she was renamed Adrian. Adrian was in company with the frigate Diamond when on 1 and 2 June 1805 Adrian captured the chasse-marées Marie and Sophie. At the time Adrian was under the command of Lieutenant Joseph Bain Bett, who apparently transferred from the hired armed cutter Rhoda. Marie was one of three chasse-marées that on 1 June he observed sailing to Brest. Adrian succeeded in first driving Marie ashore, and then capturing her. However, as the prize crew was retrieving her, a musket ball killed Adrian's mate. Marie had been carrying a cargo of wine and brandy from Bordeaux to Brest. The other two chasse-marées escaped.

Before her contract with the Navy, Industry may have been the cutter Industry, William Johns, master, of 85 tons (bm), that received a letter of marque on 20 June 1803. This Industry was armed with six 1, 1 1/2, and 2-pounder guns, and four swivel guns, and had a crew of 36 men.

== Second Adrian ==
Although the second hired armed cutter Adrian captured several enemy merchant vessels, the usual sources carry no information about the vessel herself; we have no information regarding her dimensions, size, or armament. We have the names of two of her commanders covering about three years of some five years or more years of service, but no information on the duration of her contract with the Royal Navy.

At some point in 1807 Adrian was under the command of Lieutenant John Forbes.

On 28 July 1807 Adrian was under the command of Lieutenant John Carter when she took the Danish ship Thetis, Peder Belousen, master.

On 30 January 1808 the schooner Capelin was reconnoitering the harbour at Brest when she hit the sunken Parquette Rock. Whiting, Adrian, and the cutter Entreprenante all tried to get her off, but their efforts were in vain. The vessels in attendance were able to save Capelin's crew.

On 26 October 1809, Lieutenant Charles Marsh Cumby was appointed to command Adrian, a command that he held for 10 months. While on Adrian, Cumby captured 14 merchant vessels, and "greatly annoyed the enemy's coasting trade."

On 9 November Adrian, Dreadnought, Gibraltar, Christian VII, Milford, Naiad, Unicorn, and the hired armed cutter Nimrod were all in sight when Snapper captured the French brig Modeste.

On 4 January 1810 Adrian captured Fortune.

On 24 March, the brig Julie came into Plymouth. Adrian had captured Julie as she was sailing from Nantes to Brest, on 6 March.

On 29 April, Adrian was in company with Armide and Monkey at the capture of Aimable Betzie. (Monkey, a brig, was part of the force blockading Lorient when she was wrecked on 25 December.) Daring also shared in the proceeds of the capture of Aimable Betsie.

In May 1811 Adrian apparently sailed to the West Indies. She was still listed as serving the Royal Navy in 1812–13.
