= Hired armed cutter Industry =

Two vessels named His Majesty's Hired armed cutter Industry briefly served the British Royal Navy during the Napoleonic Wars as hired armed vessels.

== The first hired armed cutter Industry (renamed Rhoda) ==
Industry was a cutter of 4588/94 tons (bm). She was armed with six 12-pounder carronades. She served under contract from 7 April 1804 to 7 December 1804. During her service she was renamed Rhoda.

However, she apparently was still in service in 1805. furthermore, the National Maritime Museum database lists her as operating in 1807.

At daylight on 12 February 1805, His Majesty's hired armed cutters Frisk and Rhoda sighted ten French gunbrigs and luggers passing through the Passage du Raz. Frisk captured the weathermost, a lugger, at 7:30 captured her about five miles from Pointe du Raz. She proved to be Gunvessel №288, armed with one 24-pounder gun, and with a complement of 25 men (20 were troops from the 44th Regiment), all under the command of enseigne de vaisseaux P. Roox. At the same time, Rhoda, under the command of Lieutenant Jos. Bain Batt, gave chase to another of the luggers. After a chase of half-an-hour, and an exchange of gunfire, Rhoda succeeded in capturing the lugger. She was Gunvessel №313, armed with one 24-pounder gun, and with a complement of 22 men (18 of them soldiers), under the command of enseigne auxiliaire Frederick Widsmann. The gunvessel had had one man killed.

Frisk and Rhoda were in company with the frigate Melampus. She succeeded in capturing two gunbrigs carrying two 24-pounder guns and one 18-pounder gun each, with a complement of 50 men each, primarily soldiers. Melampus also captured four luggers, each armed with one 18-pounder gun, and with complements of 25 men, mostly soldiers. All the above French gunvessels were part of a group of 27 sailing from Bordeaux to Brest. The cutter Nimble was also in company. The gunvessels Melampus captured were N°s 169, 174, 277, 286, 287, and 311. (Note: The share of the prize money accruing to an able seaman on Melampus, Nimble, Frisk, or Rhoda was £1 9s 7d.) (Note: These six vessels, as well as the two that Frisk and Rhoda captured all appear to be Bateaux-cannoniers (gun vessels). The two brigs were probably Batîments de 1ème Espèce (vessels of the 1st type), and the six luggers Batîments de 2ème Espèce (vessels of the 2nd type), built to two designs by Pierre-Alexandre-Laurent Forfait. Both types were designed to use 11 pairs of sweeps in addition to their sails. The brig-rigged type were designed to transport a company of infantry for an invasion force. The second type were three-masted lug-rigged vessels designed to transport an artillery piece, its caisson, and two horses.)

== The second hired armed cutter Industry (renamed Adrian) ==
Industry was a cutter of 8415/94 tons (bm). She carried eight 12-pounder carronades. She served under contract from 21 August 1804 to 25 August 1805. During her service she was renamed Adrian. Adrian was in company with the frigate Diamond when on 1 and 2 June 1805 Adrian captured the chasse-marées Marie and Sophie. Before her contract with the Navy, Industry may have been the cutter Industry, William Johns, master, of 85 tons (bm), that received a letter of marque on 20 June 1803. This Industry was armed with six 1, 1½, and 2-pounder guns, and four swivel guns, and had a crew of 36 men.

See also: HMS Industry
