= Alcalá-Galiano =

Alcalá-Galiano or Alcalá Galiano is a surname shared by several notable people:

== Paternal usage ==
- Vicente Alcalá Galiano (1757–1810), Spanish mathematician, economist, and writer
- Dionisio Alcalá Galiano (1760–1805), Spanish naval officer, cartographer, and explorer
- Antonio Alcalá Galiano (1789–1865), Spanish politician and writer; Minister of the Navy (1836) and Minister of Public Works (1865)
- Félix Alcalá-Galiano y Bermúdez (1864–1863), 6th Marquess of San Juan de Piedras Albas
- Emilio Alcalá-Galiano (1831–1914), 4th Count of Casa Valencia
- Antonio Alcalá Galiano (1842–1902)
- Álvaro Alcalá Galiano y Vildósola (1873–1936), count of Real Aprecio, Spanish painter and decorative artist
- Juan Alcalá-Galiano y Osma (1883–1936), 1st count of Romilla, Spanish politician
- Álvaro Alcalá-Galiano y Osma (1886–1936), marquis of Castel Bravo, Spanish writer, literary critic, historian, and journalist

== Maternal usage ==
- Juan Valera y Alcalá-Galiano (1824–1905), Spanish realist author, writer and political figure

== Other uses ==
- Spanish destroyer Alcalá Galiano, various Spanish Navy ships
