= Álvaro Alcalá Galiano y Vildósola =

Spanish painter (1873–1936)

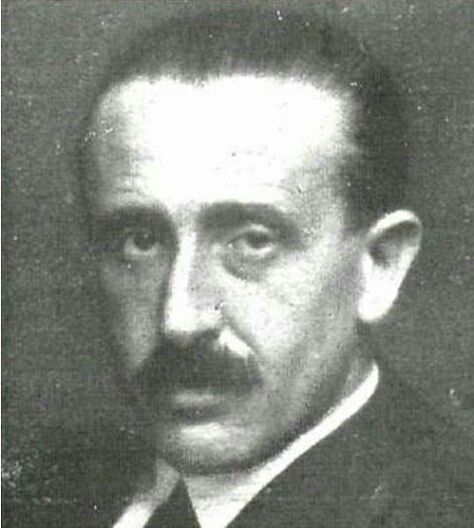
Álvaro Alcalá Galiano y Vildósola (c.1927)

Álvaro Alcalá Galiano y Vildósola, conde del Real Aprecio (21 May 1873, Bilbao - 27 November 1936, Madrid) was a Spanish painter and decorative artist.

== Biography ==
He was born to an old, aristocratic family and held several titles, including Conde de Real Aprecio, Mayordomo de Semana for King Alfonso XIII, and Maestrante of the Real Maestranza de Caballería de Zaragoza.

His first art teachers were Antonio Lecuona and Adolfo Guiard. While he was still quite young, he went to Paris with the intention of studying under Léon Bonnat. Nevertheless, his parents had the final word, so he returned to study in Madrid, in the studios of José Jiménez Aranda then, later, with Joaquín Sorolla, who considered him to be one of his best students.

In 1902, he took an extended trip to Brittany, the Netherlands, and Germany, to find subject matter for his works and expand his stylistic repertoire. He would come to focus on genre and costumbrista scenes, although he was also known for landscapes and murals.

He participated in the National Exhibition of Fine Arts on several occasions; acquiring Third Class prizes in 1897 and 1899, a Second Class prize in 1901 and, finally, a First Class prize in 1920 for his painting "La Senda" (The Path, or The Way). He was awarded a bronze medal at the Salon of 1910, and a Grand Prize at the International Exposition of Panama in 1916.

His murals may be seen at the Biscay Foral Delegation Palace, the former headquarters of the Ministry of the Navy, and the Palace of Justice, as well as several private residences.

In addition, he was one of the organizers for expositions in Bilbao and San Sebastián, and served as President of the Asociación de Pintores y Escultores Españoles. He also wrote art criticism under the pseudonym, Juan de Eguía.

In the early days of the Spanish Civil War, he was arrested by the Republican faction and executed by firing squad, during the Paracuellos massacres.

== Selected paintings ==
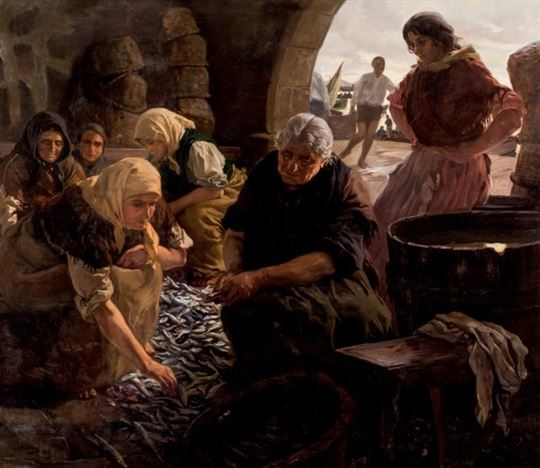
Cleaning Sardines

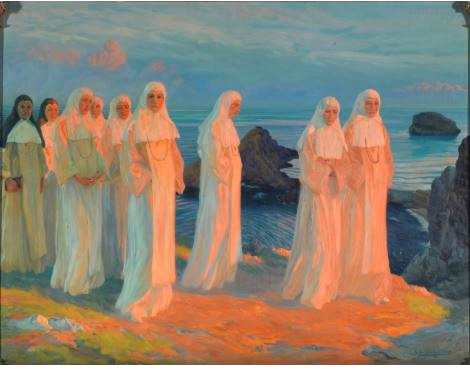
The Path

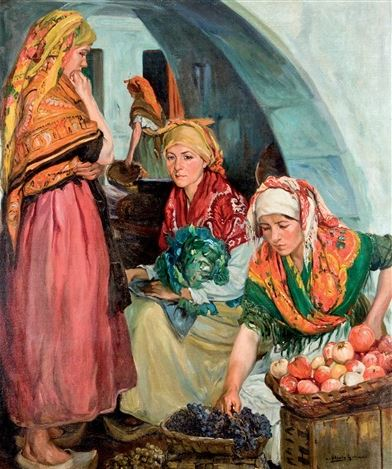
Fruit Sellers

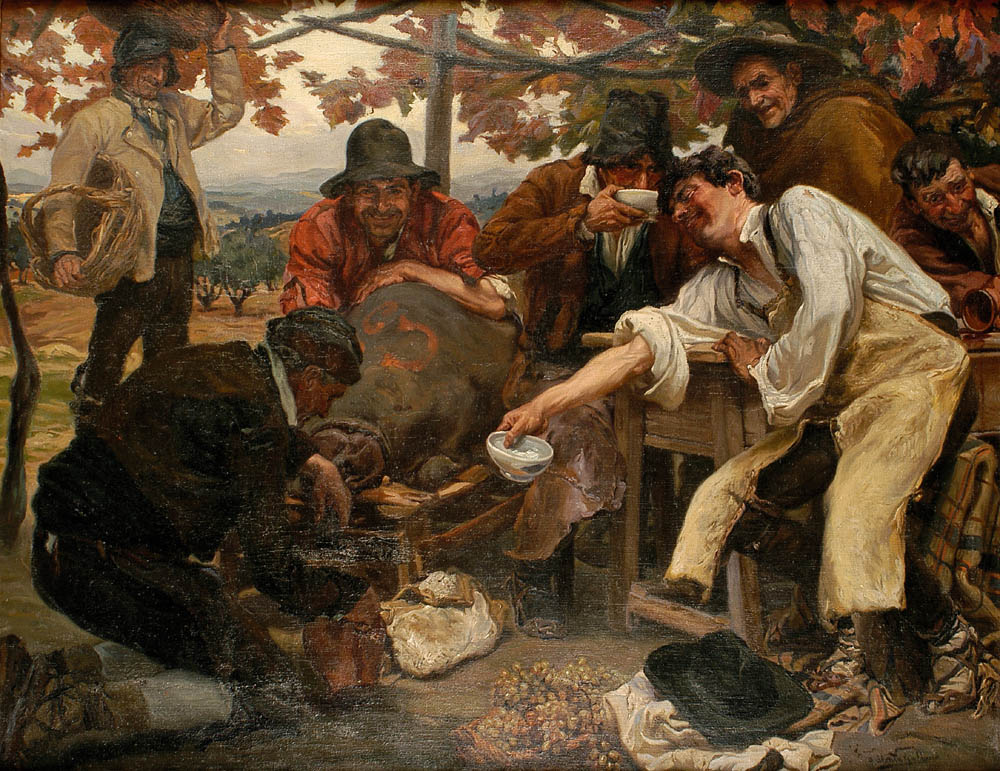
After the Grape Harvest
