= Hired armed cutter Nimrod =

During the French Revolutionary and Napoleonic Wars the British Royal Navy made use of hired armed vessels, one of which was His Majesty's hired armed cutter Nimrod. Three such vessels are recorded, but the descriptions of these vessels and the dates of their service are such that they may well represent one vessel under successive contracts. The vessel or vessels cruised, blockaded, carried despatches, and performed reconnaissance.

== The first Nimrod ==
There was a Nimrod of 7037/94 tons burthen and eight 3-pounder guns that served from 27 September 1794 to 9 April 1802. On 21 April 1798, Nimrod was among the vessels that shared in the capture of the French ship Hercule.

Nimrod shared with Révolutionnaire, Boadicea, and Pique in the capture of the Anna Christiana on 17 May. In August Nimrod captured the chasse-marée Francine with Ambuscade, commanded by Captain Henry Jenkins, and Stag.

On 1 April 1798, Nimrod and the hired armed cutter Lurcher recaptured the packet Roebuck, which the French privateer Adelaide had captured on 20 March. Nimrod and Lurcher sent Roebuck into Plymouth.

Under Lieutenant William Marsh, on 23 March 1799 Nimrod, captured the Spanish ship Golondrina. On 1 August, Nimrod arrived in Plymouth with dispatches from Vice Admiral Pole, off the Isle of Aix. Then on 25 December she helped rescue the crew of Ethalion. On 28 December 1799 she re-captured the brig Neptune. Neptune, Morgan, master, arrived at Plymouth on 6 January. In February 1800 salvage money resulting from the re-capture of Neptune was due to be paid.

Nimrod was part of Admiral Sir John Borlase Warren's squadron and so entitled to share in the proceeds from the recapture of Lancaster on 28 June 1800. She also shared in the proceeds of Vigilant, Menais, the salvage of Industry, the sale of a wreck, and the proceeds of Insolent and Ann, all taken by Captain Edward Pellew's squadron. Next Nimrod shared in the prize money from the squadron's capture of the French privateer Guêppe.

In December Nimrod recaptured Skene, Crawly, master, which had been sailing from Dublin to London when the French privateer Egyptian captured Skene. Nimrod sent Skene into Falmouth on 30 December.

== The second Nimrod ==
There was a Nimrod of 6978/94 tons burthen and six 3-pounder guns that served from 25 June 1803 to 10 October 1808. She joined the blockade of Brest on 16 July and Admiral William Cornwallis placed her inshore, after warning her to be careful as she was not strongly armed.

On 17 August Ville de Paris captured the French privateer Messager in sight of Nimrod, commanded by William Marsh. In January 1805 head and prize money from the proceeds of Messager was due to be paid. The fact that her captain was William Marsh suggests that the first and second Nimrods were the same vessel, despite the slight discrepancies in their descriptions.

== The third Nimrod ==
There was a Nimrod of 7562/94 tons burthen and six 3-pounder guns that served from 11 October 1808 to 20 May 1814.

On 1 January 1809 Nimrod was under the command of Master's Mate Edward Tapley and shared in the proceeds of the recapture of the ship Crawford by Amazon.

In April 1809 Nimrod served at the Battle of the Basque Roads. William Congreve, who had arrived with a transport, fitted Whiting, Nimrod and the other hired armed cutter, King George, with rockets. On 11 April the three vessels took up a position near the Boyard Shoal (see Fort Boyard) while fireships made a night attack on the French ships. The next day all three, together with a number of other vessels, opened fire upon Océan, Régulus, and the frigate Indienne, as those ships lay aground. The first two eventually escaped, and the last was one of four eventually destroyed, though by her own crew some days later to avoid capture. (Note: Head money was paid in March 1819. An ordinary seaman received 13 shillings; a first-class share was worth £86 13s 2¼d.) In 1847 the surviving members of the crews of all the British vessels at the battle qualified for the Naval General Service Medal with clasp "Basque Roads 1809".

On 9 November 1809 Nimrod and the hired armed cutter Adrian were among the vessels that shared in Snapper's capture of the French brig Modeste. Around the end of December, Nimrod, under the command of Jno. Tapley, recaptured the ship Elshon.

On 12 September 1810, Nimrod was under the command of William Peake when she captured Sophie. Then on 28 September Nimrod was among the vessels sharing in the capture of San Nicolas and Aventura. Next, on 13 December 1810 Nimrod was in company with Venerable and several other vessels at the capture of Goede Trouw. Lastly, on 18 December, Nimrod, and Royal Oak were in sight when Valiant captured the American schooner Polly.

On 7 January 1811 Nimrod captured Maria Francoise and sent her into Plymouth as a prize. Prize money was due to be paid in August 1811. Nimrod, Poictiers, and Caledonia shared in the capture on 22 August 1812 of the cargo of the French vessel Auguste. The British removed her cargo of wine before destroying her. On 22 November, Nimrod, under the command of Thomas Peake, captured Belisario.

On 23 December Nimrod, Thomas Peake, Master and Commander, was in company with Armide when they recaptured the English brig Sparkler, A. Brown, master. Nimrod sent Sparkler into Portland Roads. Sparkler had been sailing from Cadiz to London when captured.

In January 1813 Nimrod was escorting a convoy when the American privateer Hunter, of 16 guns and 80 men, succeeded in capturing a transport and a brig. Shortly thereafter HMS Phoebe captured Hunter and sent her into Plymouth.

On 9 March Nimrod recaptured Margaret, J. Simpson, master. The American privateer True Blooded Yankee had taken Margaret and put on board a prize crew that included a British seaman, John Wiltshire. The British tried Wiltshire for piracy and hanged him.

In January 1814, while serving in the blockade of Brest, Nimrod was present when Clarence captured the brig Henriette. This gave rise to a court case in which Clarence claimed sole prize rights and the other vessels in the blockading squadron claimed shares. The Court ruled that as a matter of principle: "When a prize is taken coming out of a blockaded port, by one of the blockading squadron stationed off the mouth of the harbour, the other ships of the squadron, although stationed at some distance, are entitled to share."

However, when the case came up for a hearing on the evidence, the court rejected the squadron's claim on the grounds that Henriette did not come out from Brest but rather was a small coaster traveling between Légué and Croisi that had taken shelter in Cannonet Bay.

On 2 July 1815 the Chasse-marée Virgen de Roden came into Falmouth. She was a prize to the cutter Nimrod. She had been sailing from Bordeaux to Brest with a cargo of wine, brandy, etc.

== Other Nimrods ==
There was also a Nimrod of 69 tons burthen, eight 3-pounder guns, and under the command of Thomas Tapley, that received a letter of marque on 15 September 1795. She may have been the same vessel as the first Nimrod above, but if so she would not have been operating simultaneously under a contract with the Royal Navy and a letter of marque.
