= Eugenio Álvarez Dumont =

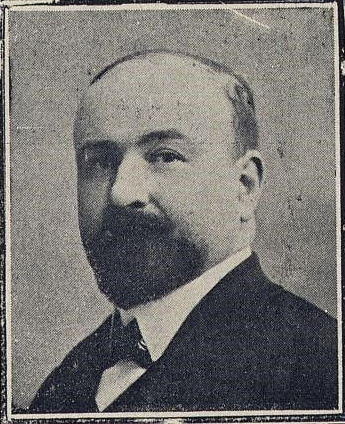
Portrait of Eugenio Álvarez Dumont, 1908

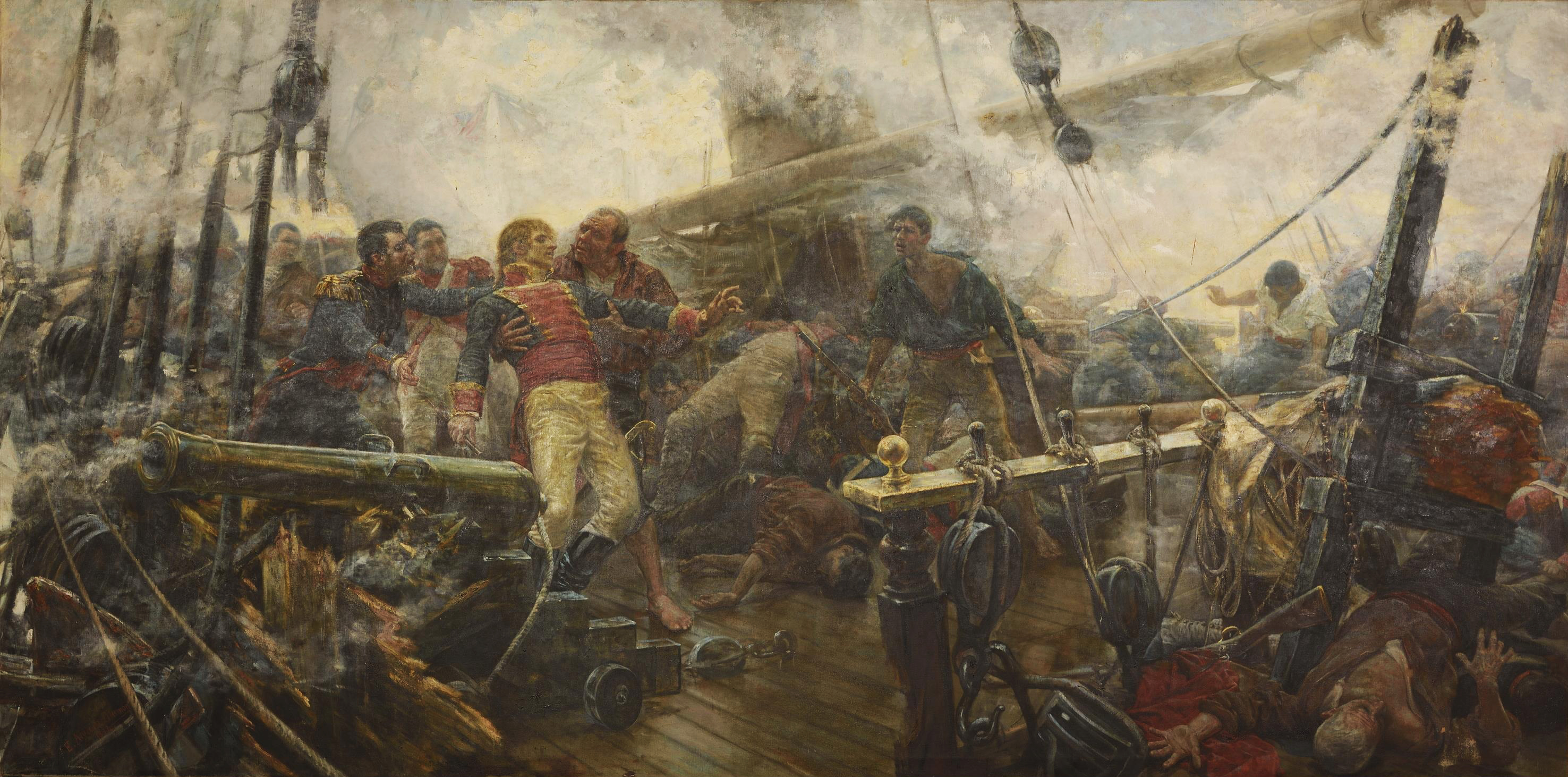
The Death of Churruca (1892)

Eugenio Álvarez Dumont (1864, Tunis - 1927, Buenos Aires) was a Spanish painter; primarily of Orientalist and costumbrista scenes, although he is best remembered as a battle painter, for his scenes from the Peninsular War. His brother, César Álvarez Dumont, was also a well known artist.

== Biography ==
He received his first artistic training at the Escuela de Bellas Artes de San Fernando in Madrid, then at the Academia de España and the Accademia Chigi in Rome. He received an honorary mention there for one of his first sketches; The Death of Churruca, which later served as the basis for one of his best known paintings. Vicente Palmaroli had a major influence on his work.

In 1898, he travelled through North Africa with his brother, producing Orientalist scenes. Later, he moved to Paris then, finally to Madrid, where he dedicated himself to teaching, at the Escuela de Artes e Industrias, and painting costumbrista scenes. He was awarded medals at the National Exhibition of Fine Arts in 1887 and 1892.

In 1906, he exhibited his works at the "IV Exposición de Arte Español", held in Buenos Aires under the sponsorship of the painter and art dealer, José Pinelo Llull (1861-1922). In 1910, he was invited to participate in an exhibition celebrating the centennial of Buenos Aires, but that showing was not as successful.

Toward the end of his life, he settled in Buenos Aires, where he did decorative paintings as well as canvases, and provided illustrations for Argentine books and magazines.
