= HMS Capelin (1804) =

History

United Kingdom
- Name: HMS Capelin
- Ordered: 23 June 1803
- Builder: Goodrich & Co. (prime contractor), Bermuda
- Laid down: 1803
- Launched: 1804
- Fate: Wrecked 30 June 1808

General characteristics
- Type: Ballahoo-class schooner
- Tons burthen: 7041/94 (bm)
- Length: 55 ft 2 in (16.8 m) (overall); 40 ft 10 1/2 in (12.5 m) (keel)
- Beam: 18 ft 0 in (5.5 m)
- Depth of hold: 9 ft 0 in (2.7 m)
- Sail plan: Schooner
- Complement: 20
- Armament: 4 × 12-pounder carronades

HMS Capelin was a Royal Navy Ballahoo-class schooner carrying four 12-pounder carronades and a crew of 20. The prime contractor for the vessel was Goodrich & Co., in Bermuda, and she was launched in 1804. Like many of her class and the related Cuckoo-class schooners, she succumbed to the perils of the sea relatively early in her career.

== Career ==
In May 1804 she was commissioned under Lieutenant Archibald McDonald (or M'Donald; acting) for the Halifax station. On 20 December 1806 he faced a court martial for his conduct after Capelin had run aground while under his command. The court decided that the charge was partly proven and so reprimanded him. It also ruled that he forfeit all seniority on the lieutenants' list. Still, McDonald was promoted to lieutenant on 22 December 1806 and commanded Capelin until February 1807. At some point, possibly in 1806, Lieutenant J. Beckett may have commanded her for a short period.

In 1807 Capelin was off Le Havre and under Lieutenant Thomas Delafons. On 11 August the ship Georgetown and the brig Robert arrived in Malta. A Spanish privateer had captured them off Sicilly, but Capelin had retaken them.

Lieutenant Josias Bray replaced Delafons and took command on 13 January 1808.

== Fate ==
On 25 January Capelin was in company with Champion and Sybille when Sybille captured the Grand Argus. Capellin was reconnoitering the harbour at Brest, France, when she hit the sunken Parquette Rock at 7 am on 30 June. Whiting, the hired armed cutter Adrian and the cutter Entreprenante all tried to get her off. However, no sooner had Entreprenante succeeded than water gushed in, causing Capelin to sink quickly, stern first. The vessels in attendance saved her crew. The subsequent court martial for the loss of Capelin reprimanded Bray for not being on deck when she approached the harbour. The court martial board also reprimanded Gunner's Mate Thomas Cole, who had been in charge of the watch, for not calling Bray when the haze had caused him to lose sight of the light at Pointe de Sainte Matthieu.
