= HMS Nonpareil (1808) =

History

United States
- Builder: Price, Baltimore
- Launched: 1801, or 1807
- Captured: 1808

United Kingdom
- Name: HMS Nonpareil
- Acquired: 1808 by purchase of a prize
- Fate: Damaged 1812 and sold 1813

General characteristics
- Tons burthen: 210 (bm)
- Length: Royal Navy:88 ft (26.8 m); At the rails:94 ft 1 in (28.7 m); Deck:89 ft 6 in (27.3 m)
- Beam: 23 ft (7.0 m), or 22 ft 10 in (7.0 m)
- Armament: 12 × 12-pounder carronades

HMS Nonpareil was launched at Baltimore in 1801 or 1807. The Navy captured her in 1808 and purchased her. Nonpareil captured a French naval brig in a severe action in 1810. The Navy sold Nonpareil in 1813 after a storm damaged her.

== Origins and capture ==
Sources differ over when Nonpareil was launched, and when she was captured. Two sources state that she was launched in 1801.

Some sources state that the British seized Nonpareil when they captured Montevideo in 1807.

Diana detained Nonpareil, Lumley, master, of Baltimore, on 4 February 1808, and sent her into Plymouth. A prize court condemned her as a blockade runner.

== Royal Navy ==
The Navy purchased Nonpareil and registered her on 7 July 1808. Lieutenant James Dickenson commissioned her in June. On 26 March 1809 he sailed her for the Spanish Coast. Then on 23 June 1810 Dickenson sailed Nonpareil for Newfoundland.

On 10 October 1808 Nonpareil and Snapper went in pursuit of a vessel leaving Corruna suspected of being a French privateer from Martinique. Nonpareil lost her in the night. Nonpareil had arrived on the 9th with a messenger, and was about to return to England, perhaps with despatches.

On 12 October Nonpareil captured the merchantman Belle Coquette. Nonpareil was in company with Snapper.

On 28 February 1809 Nonpareil captured the merchantman Natalie.

On 10 May 1810, Nonpareil took the brig Cannoniere, off the Vilaine. The action took an hour and a quarter before Cannoniere struck. Cannoniere had a crew of 61 men and was armed with three 12-pounder guns and two 24-pounder carronades. The French lost 11 men killed and eight wounded; British casualties were two wounded. (Note: In this case Cannoniere appears to be a description, not a name. The prize money notice refers to her as "Canoniere (or No.176)". If so, she may have been one of the Canonnière No.22 Class of chaloupes-canonnières. No. 176 was built at Bordeaux between July 1803 and February 1804.) Lloyd's List reported that Cannoniere had been armed with 32-pounder and three 18–pounder guns, and 10 swivel guns; she had a crew of 70 men.

Lieutenant Thomas Cowper Sherwin commanded Nonpareil from 22 October 1810 in the Channel until 1812.

Nonpareil was one of the 25 naval vessels that shared in the proceeds of the detention of Asia on 5 August 1812. (Note: A first-class share was worth £9 10s 10d; a sixth-class share, that of an ordinary seaman, was worth 2s 5d.)

== Fate ==
A storm in the Tagus on 19 December 1812 damaged Nonpareil. She was among the many vessels wrecked or damaged there. She was sold there in 1813.

The courtmartial on 24 December 1812 absolved Sherwin, his officers, and the crew of Nonpareil of any blame for her loss.
