= HMS Industry =

Several ships of the Royal Navy have been named HMS Industry.

- HMS Industry (1765), a sloop in service in 1765
- HMS Industry (1794), purchased in 1794 as a fireship, but broken up in 1795
- HMS Industry (1814), an Aid-class storeship launched in 1814, fitted in 1824 to carry shells and ammunition; in 1835 fitted as a chapel ship for the Isle of Man; broken up 1846
- HMS Industry (1854), an iron screw storeship launched and purchased in 1854, became a boom defence ship (BDS) in 1901, and was sold in 1911
- HMS Industry (1901) (Glasgow renamed 1900), launched 1901, Royal Fleet Auxiliary (RFA)-manned from 1914; as Q-ship used the names Tay and Tyne; torpedoed 1918 but reached harbour; sold 1924 for breaking up

== Hired vessels ==
- HM Irish gun vessel Industry, 78 tons (bm) and six guns, served under contract 1803 to 1809, or 1806–10
- HM hired armed cutter Industry

== See also ==
- HMS Tay and Tyne (renamed RFA Industry in 1920)
