= HMS Staunch (1797) =

Brig of the Royal Navy

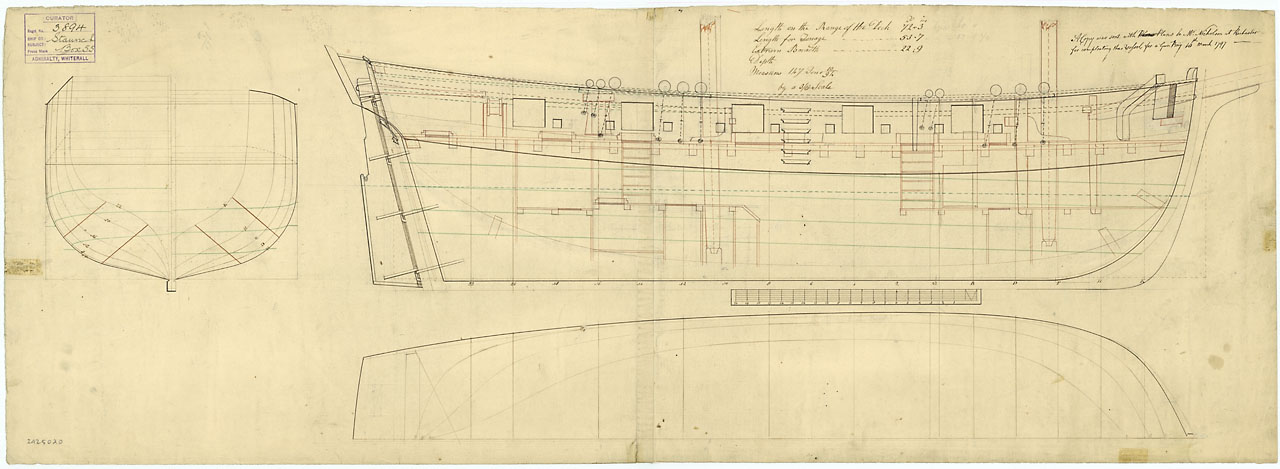
- Staunch

History

Great Britain
- Name: HMS GB No. 44
- Builder: John Nicholson, Rochester
- Launched: 1 May 1797
- Acquired: By purchase
- Commissioned: June 1797
- Renamed: HMS Staunch on 7 August 1797
- Fate: Sold 1803

General characteristics
- Type: Gun-vessel
- Tons burthen: 152 76/94 bm
- Length: 68 ft 4 in (20.8 m) (gundeck); 53 ft 11 in (16.4 m) (keel)
- Beam: 23 ft 1 in (7.0 m)
- Draught: 4 ft 8 in (1.42 m) (unladen);7 ft 10 in (2.4 m) (laden)
- Depth of hold: 9 ft 10 in (3.0 m)
- Sail plan: Brig
- Complement: 50
- Armament: 10 × 18-pounder carronades + 2 × 24-pounder chase guns

HMS Staunch was a mercantile vessel that the Royal Navy purchased in frame on the stocks at Kent. She had a brief, unremarkable career until the Navy sold her 1803.

Lieutenant John Conn commissioned her in June 1797 and she sailed on 11 June. In June 1798 Lieutenant Constantine Henvill replaced Conn. He sailed Staunch in April 1800 for the Leeward Islands. Lieutenant John Broughton took command in 1802 and remained her commander until he paid her off in February 1803. She was sold later in 1803.
