= Biscay Foral Delegation Palace =

Building in Bilbao, Spain

Coordinates: 43°15′43″N 2°55′55″W

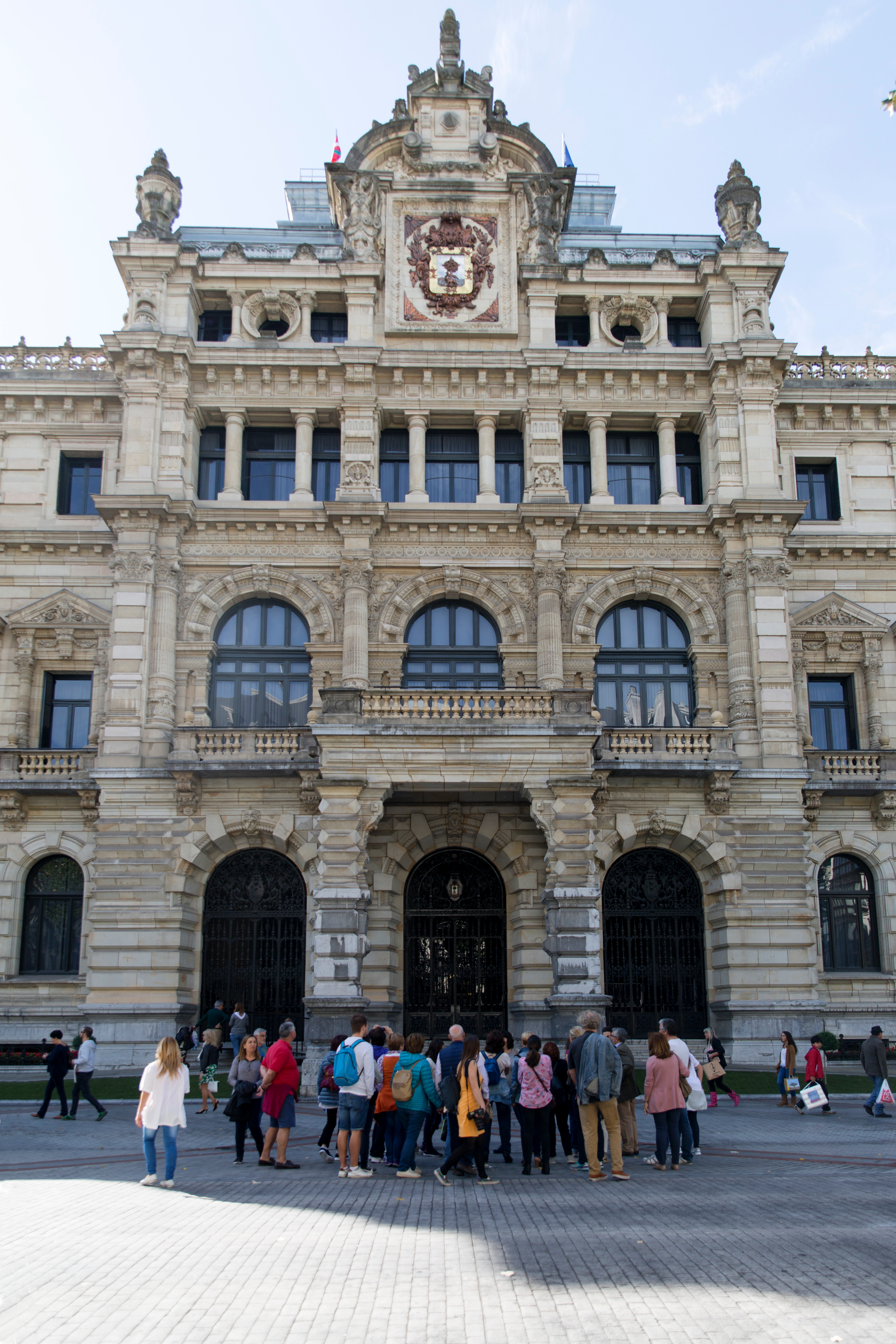
The Delegation Palace in Bilbao.

The Bizkaia Delegation Palace is an eclectic mansion in the Ensanche area of Bilbao, Spain. It's the seat of the executive branch of Government of Biscay, the legislative assembly meets in Gernika. The Biscay Palace of the Foral Deputation (also known as simply The Foral Palace), located at 25 Gran Vía, Bilbao, is a free-standing rectangular building, of solid and majestic appearance. Designed by the architect Luis Aladrén Mendivil, it is considered “a pinnacle work of Alfonsine eclecticism” in Vizcaya. It was built between 1890 and 1900 by the Gran Vía de Don Diego López de Haro avenue.

It bears resemblance to projected buildings at the end of the 19th century in its eclectic style, which is made self-evident in the use of elements of diverse historical styles and in, moreover, a great preoccupation with the composition of the facades in an ornamental way. The building consists of a basement, mezzanine, two floors, an attic, and a rooftop terrace.

The main façade on Gran Vía street stands out when one observes the advanced body from the line of the façade, which includes a covered entrance over which there are a balcony and a coat of arms. Inside, the main staircase distributes and organizes the annexes.

The ornamental riches grow as much on the exterior as the interior, for example, chair cushions knit with diamonds, where there are numerous works of art surrounded by lush furniture and pictorial ornamentation on the walls and ceilings.

It bears mentioning the so-called 'Throne Room', which houses two painted murals by José Echenaguisa Errazquin (1844-1912), a painter of international success born in Fuenterrabía, a border town in Gipuzkoa province in the Basque Country. These murals, “Juramento de los Fueros” (Swearing of the Foros) and “Pacificacion de oñacinos y gamboinos” (Peacemaking between the Oñazes and the Gamboinos), are often reproduced in textbooks and history books that discuss the Basque Country.

There are diverse pieces of art conserved in the Palace, like a pair of jars gifted by Eugenia de Montijo, wife of Napoleon III of France.

Across the street on its back, there is the Library of Biscay.

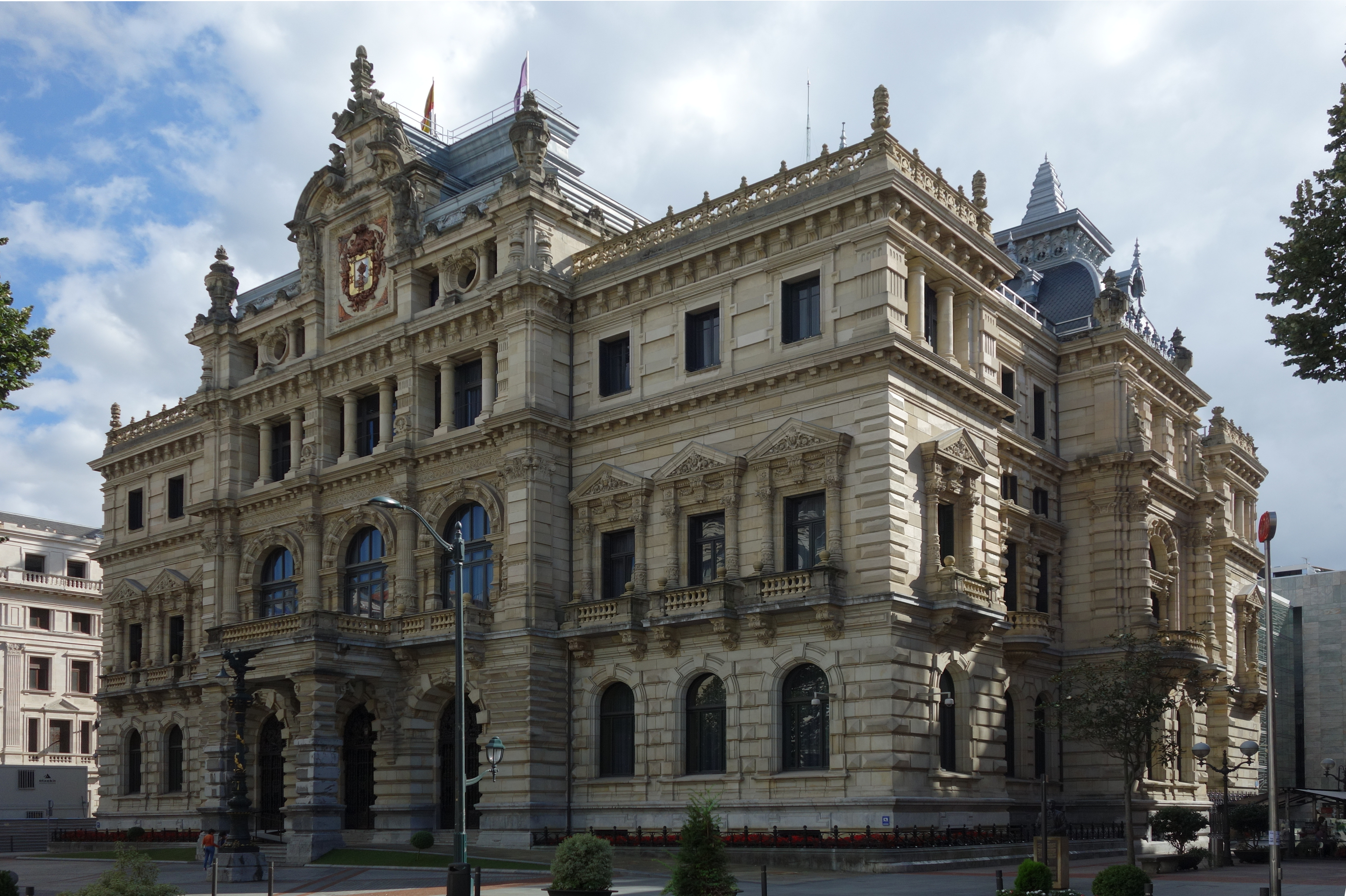
The palace of Biscay Foral Council
