= Spanish destroyer Alcalá Galiano =

Three destroyers of the Spanish Navy were named Alcalá Galiano –

- Spanish destroyer Alcalá Galiano (1925), a Churruca-class destroyer sold to Argentina, renamed ARA Juan de Garay, and decommissioned in 1960
- Spanish destroyer Alcalá Galiano (AG), a Churruca-class destroyer in service from 1931 to 1963.
- Alcalá Galiano (D24), a Lepanto-class destroyer in service from 1960 to 1988 which previously served in the United States Navy as the Fletcher-class destroyer USS Jarvis (DD-799).
