= Cosme Damián Churruca =

Spanish Navy officer and politician

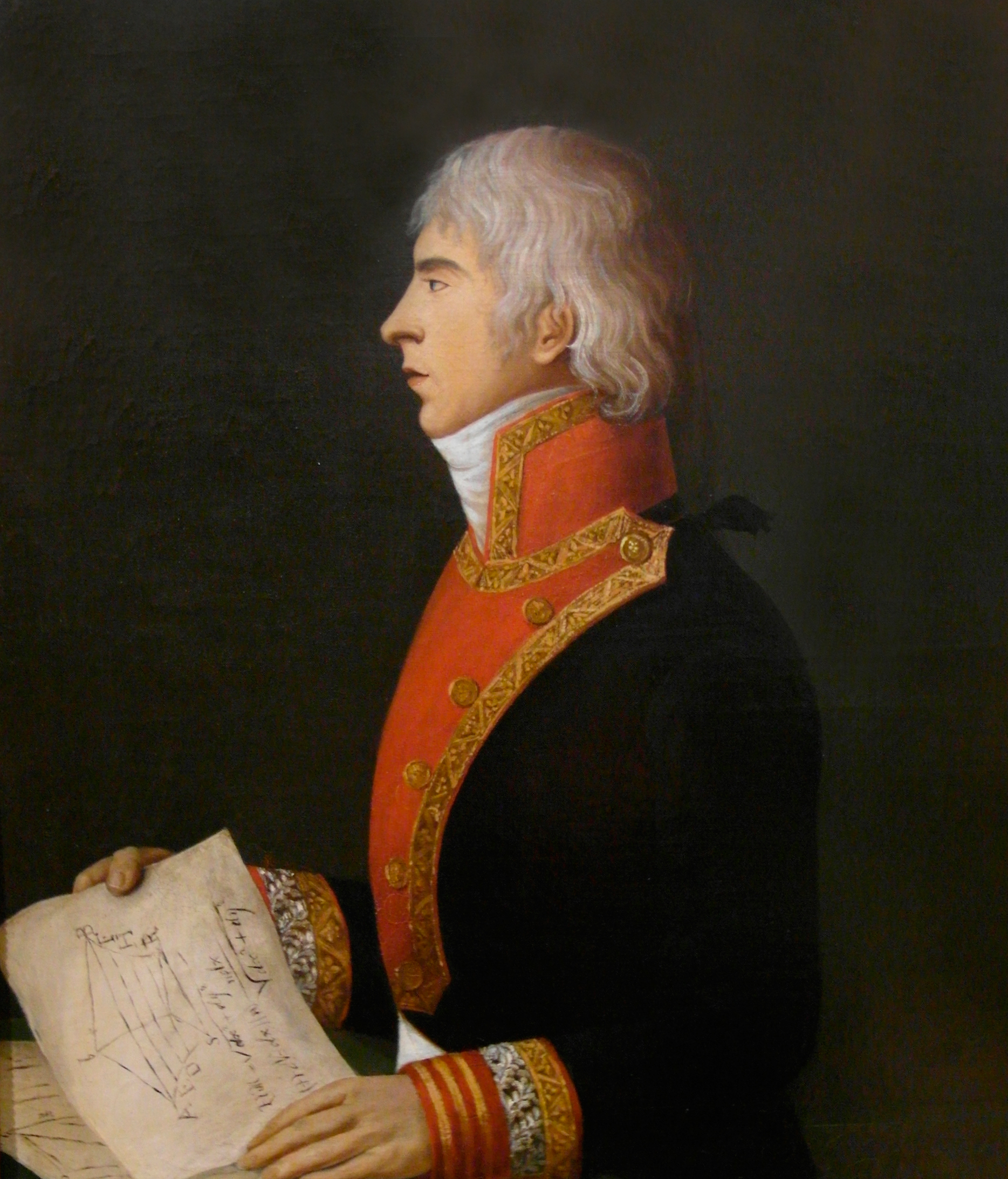
- 1848 portrait
- Born: Cosme Damián de Churruca y Elorza; 27 September 1761; Mutriku, Gipuzkoa, Spain
- Died: 21 October 1805 (aged 44) Cape Trafalgar
- Allegiance: Spain
- Branch: Spanish Navy
- Service years: 1778–1805
- Rank: Admiral
- Commands: Principe de Asturias; San Juan Nepomuceno
- Conflicts: American Revolutionary War; Great Siege of Gibraltar; Napoleonic Wars; Battle of Trafalgar †

Admiral Cosme Damián de Churruca y Elorza (27 September 1761 – 21 October 1805) was a Spanish Navy officer and politician. During the Battle of Trafalgar, he was the commanding officer of the ship of the line San Juan Nepomuceno, which he defended to his death.

== Early life ==
Churruca was born in Mutriku, the fourth son of Francisco de Churruca, the mayor of the town. He received his early years education in the Seminary of Burgos, initially thinking of becoming a priest. Then, he entered the School of Bergara where he would become member of Real Sociedad Bascongada de Amigos del País until his death. After finishing his studies, inspired by the adventures of his relative José Antonio de Gaztañeta, he joined the Naval Academy of Cádiz in 1776, and got his degree in the Naval Academy of Ferrol in 1778, being commissioned into the Spanish Navy.

In 1781, Churruca participated in the Great Siege of Gibraltar under the command of Ignacio María de Álava, earning a distinguished reputation for his services. In 1805, just a few months before his death, Churruca married María Dolores Ruiz de Apodaca, niece of Juan Ruiz de Apodaca, naval officer and viceroy of New Spain.

== Battle of Trafalgar ==
The squadron to which San Juan was assigned sailed on 13 August from the port of Ferrol. Federico Gravina had given Churruca a place of honour, the head of the vanguard. Churruca completed his mission with the highest merit and upon his arrival to Cádiz, redoubled his efforts in training his recently recruited and inexperienced civilian crew. It was at this time he married Maria de los Dolores Ruiz de Apodaca, daughter of Brigadier don Vicente, and cousin of the Duke of Venadito.

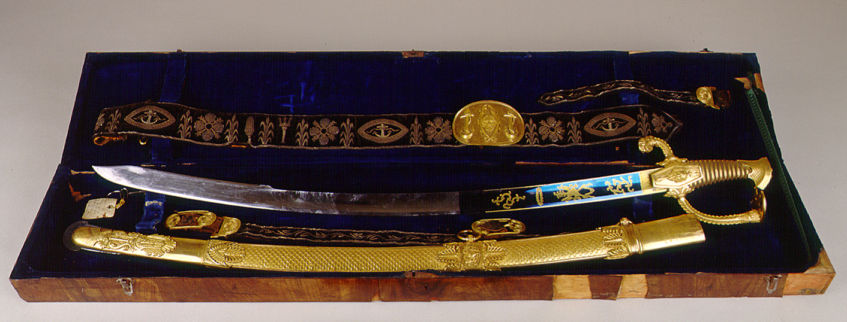
Churruca's ceremonial sabre, made by Nicolas-Noël Boutet

With the Spanish and French squadrons reunited in the port of Cádiz, they sailed on a course to Marticina, where they took the fort of Del Diamante and captured a British convoy of 16 merchantmen; in these moments Vice-admiral Pierre-Charles Villeneuve, the chief of the combined fleet, was informed of the presence of British Vice-admiral Horatio Nelson in the Antillas. Villeneuve now decided he had completed his objective, which was to draw British naval forces to the other shore of the Atlantic, so he decided to sail the combined fleet back to Ferrol. However, in the cape of Finisterre, he bumped into the squadron of Admiral Calder, where a battle ensued. The majority of the French squadron continued to Ferrol, while the remaining ships were left to fend for themselves. Their defeat was attributed by Napoelon to the indecision and poor command of Villeneuve. Napoleon, upon reading reports of the battle, stated: "The Spanish have behaved like lions, while their admiral only offered curses."

The combined fleet entered Ferrol after the battle, proceeding in continuation to La Coruña. From this port, Villeneuve set a course to Cádiz, ignoring Napoleon's order to go to Brest. Once there, despite the protests and opposing opinions of Churruca, Gravina and Alcalá-Galiano, Villeneuve abandoned the Bay of Cádiz and sailed for Cape of Trafalgar on 21 October 1805. Before sailing on 20 October, Churruca wrote to his brother:

On the San Juan in Cádiz on 11 October. Dear brother: since we left Ferrol nobody has received their pay, despite these being declared in advance and classified as soldiers’ prest. To this end they are owed four months, and they hold no hope of seeing one real in a long time; they owe us four months of salary as well, but we won’t receive a morsel, despite the hard work we are doing: Because of this I cannot thank you enough for freeing Dolores from the hardships she would suffer to pay you 1.356 reales, which I will reimburse you as soon as I can. In the meantime I have found in Ferrol a rich friend who will help Dolores as she needs, and I remain calm in having decently assured her sustenance. This is the work with which we serve the King, that in no degree can we rely on our wages... If you come to hear that my ship has been taken, know that I am dead.

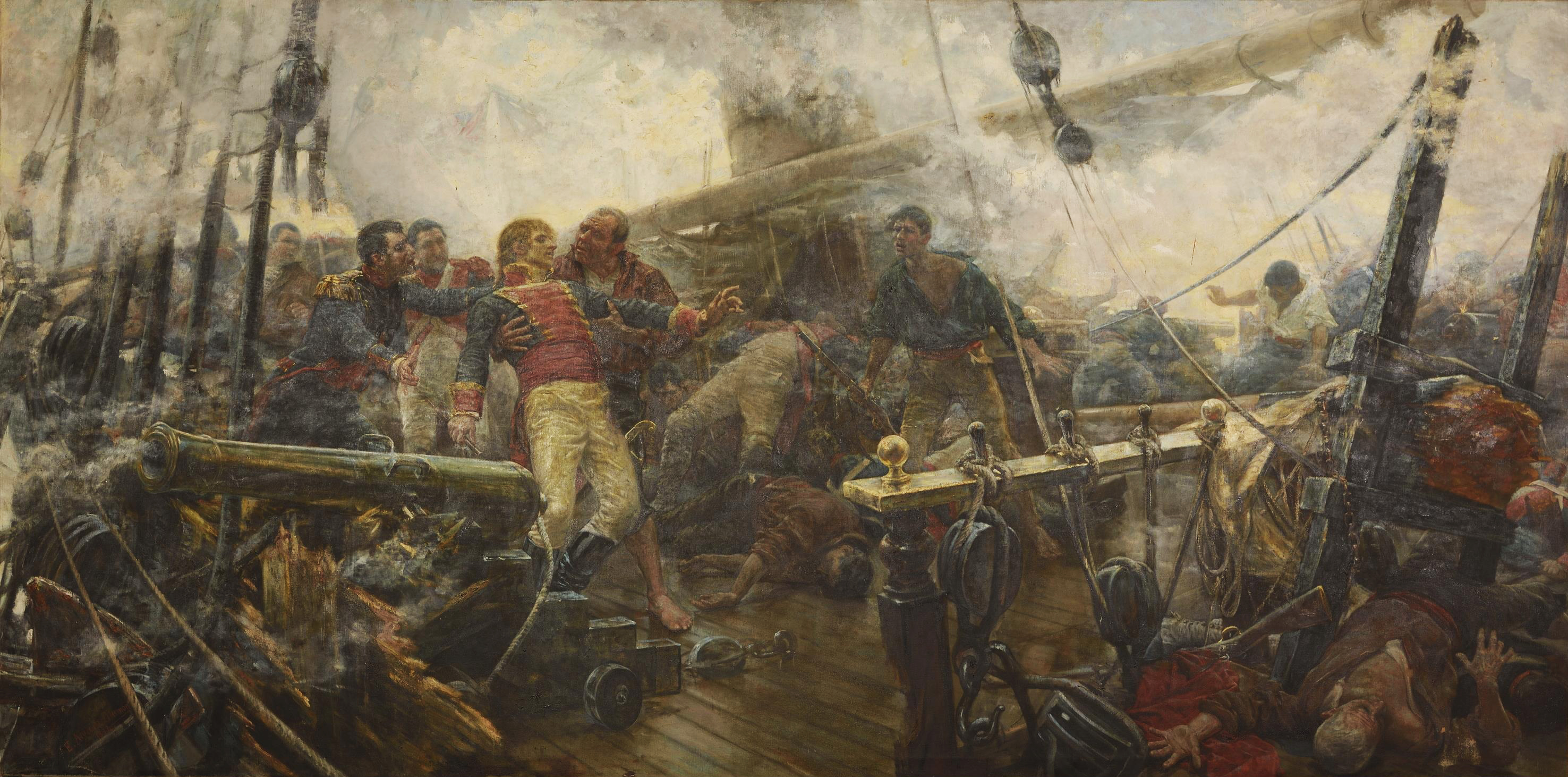
1892 painting of Churruca's death

21 October dawned, and in sight of Nelsons's fleet Churruca ordered the colours to be nailed to the mast, and ordered that they should not be taken down while he still lived. Under the command of Churruca, the San Juan Nepomuceno demonstrated military precision, daring and efficiency, despite finding itself alone against six British ships, including HMS Defiance, HMS Tonnant, HMS Bellerophon and HMS Dreadnought. Churruca died after a British cannonball tore his leg off. Unable to break the circle of fire and in order to prevent the vessel sinking with all the wounded trapped below, San Juan surrendered with over 100 dead and 150 wounded on board. His officers kept their word, and only lowered the colours after his death. The British, who captured San Juan and brought it to Gibraltar, expressed their admiration for Churruca by having his name written above San Juan's cabin in gold letters and advising those entered it to remove their hat as if he was still present.

== Legacy ==
Churruca was posthumously promoted to admiral, and in his memory his cousin received the title Count of Churruca. The events to which Churruca was a protagonist, were novelised in 1872 by Benito Pérez Galdós, in Trafalgar, the first title of his Episodios Nacionales.

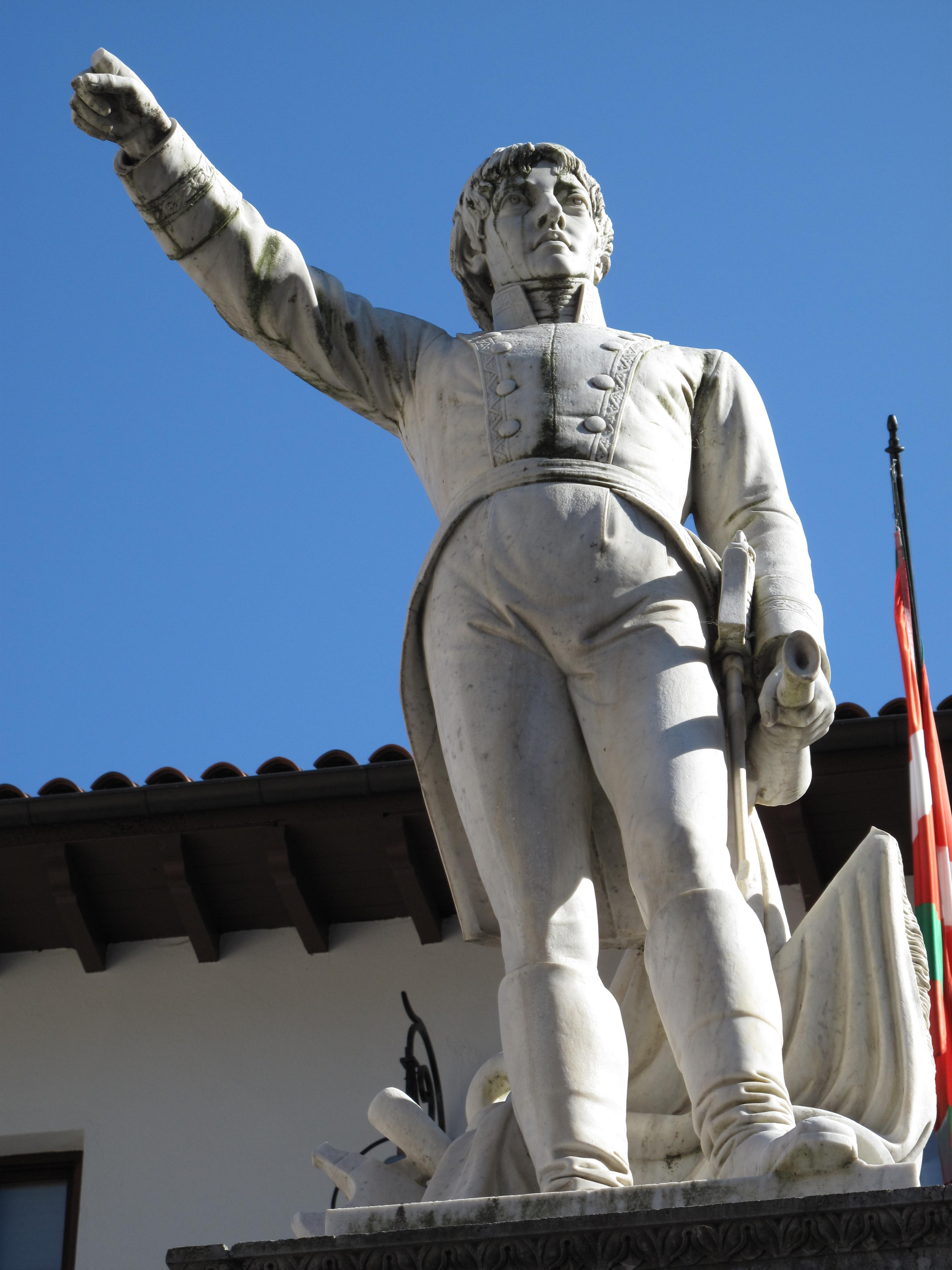
Statue of Churruca in Mutriku.

A statue in his memory stands in his native Mutriku, as well as Ferrol, where a simple monument records his death by the Academy. In San Fernando there is a stone in the third pulpit of the Panteon de Marinos Ilustres (Pantheon of Illustrious Sailors) which reads:

To the memory of Brigadier of the Navy Don Cosme Damián de Churruca, gloriously dead on the ship of his command San Juan Nepomuceno in the combat of Trafalgar. 21 October in 1805

After Trafalgar, the ship was taken to Gibraltar and entered British service, initially as HMS Berwick, before her Spanish name was restored. In honour of Churruca's courage, his cabin bore his name on a brass plate, and all who entered were required to remove their hat as a mark of respect for a gallant enemy. HMS San Juan served as a supply hulk in Gibraltar until 1815, when she was broken up.

In the 1942 Spanish film Raza, based on a semi-autobiographical script by then head of state Francisco Franco, the main characters are a family descending from Churruca.

In 1976 Spain issued a 7pta postage stamp portraying Churruca to honor him.
