= HMS Milford (1809) =

Ship of the line of the Royal Navy

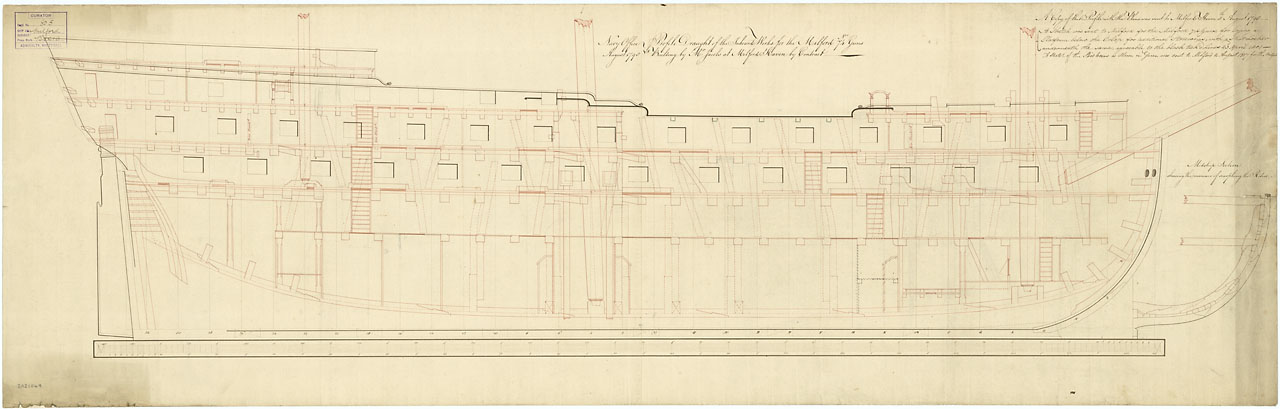
- Milford

History

United Kingdom
- Name: HMS Milford
- Ordered: 6 December 1796
- Builder: Jacobs, Milford Haven
- Laid down: June 1798
- Launched: 1 April 1809
- Fate: Broken up, 1846

General characteristics
- Class & type: 74-gun third rate ship of the line
- Tons burthen: 1919 (bm)
- Length: 181 ft (55 m) (gundeck)
- Beam: 49 ft (15 m)
- Depth of hold: 21 ft (6.4 m)
- Propulsion: Sails
- Sail plan: Full-rigged ship
- Armament: Gundeck: 28 × 32-pounder guns; Upper gundeck: 30 × 24-pounder guns; QD: 12 × 9-pounder guns; Fc: 4 × 9-pounder guns

HMS Milford was a 74-gun third rate ship of the line of the Royal Navy, launched on 1 April 1809 at Milford Haven. She was designed by Jean-Louis Barrallier as a large class 74, and was the only ship built to her draught. As a large 74, she carried 24 pdrs on her upper gun deck, instead of the 18 pdrs found on the middling and common class 74s.

Milford was placed on harbour service in 1825, and was broken up in 1846.
