= Chasse-marée =

Archaic type of decked commercial sailing vessel

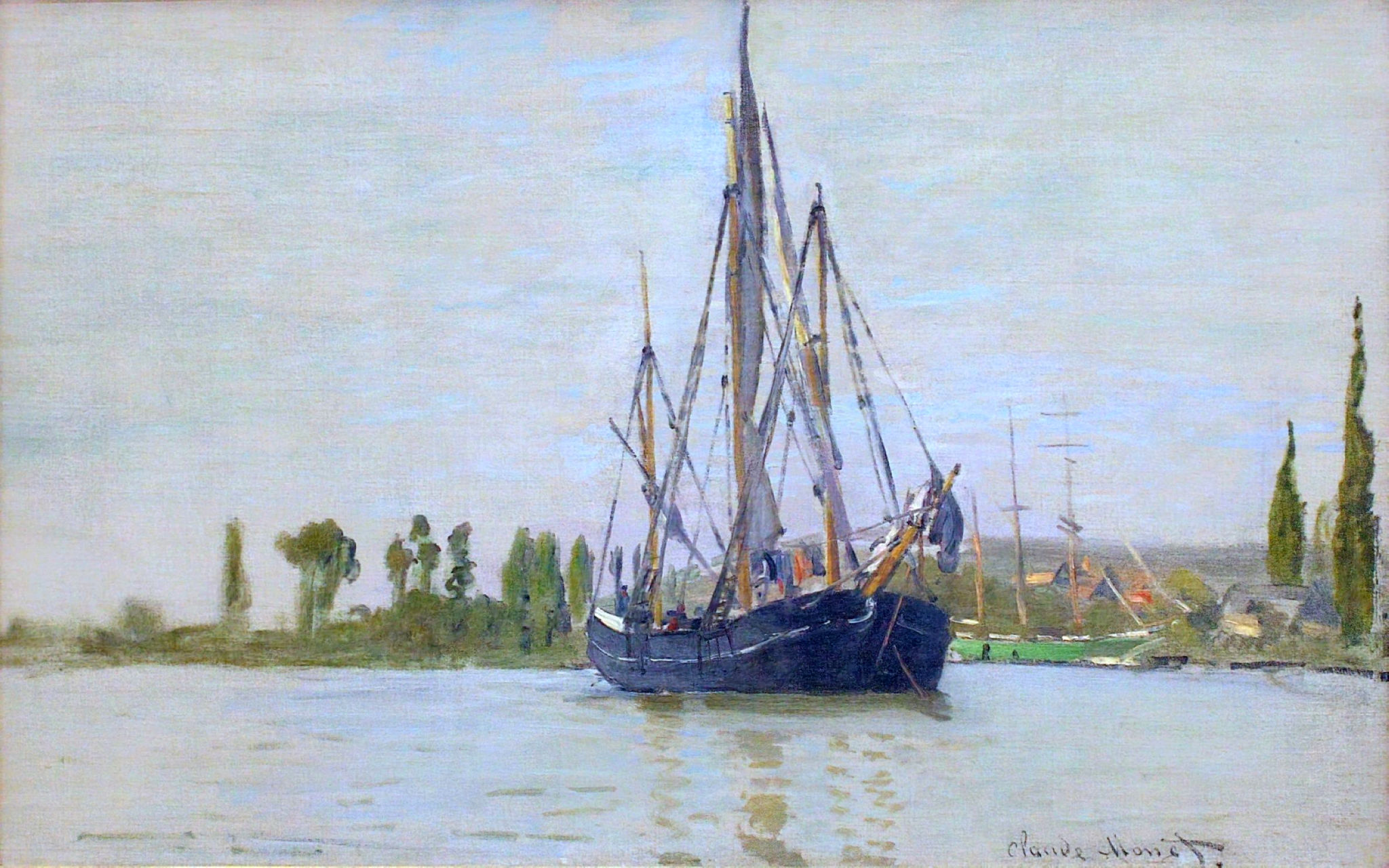
French chasse-maree at anchor, Claude Monet circa 1872

In English, a chasse-marée is a specific, archaic type of decked commercial sailing vessel. In French, un chasse-marée was 'a wholesale fishmonger', originally on the Channel coast of France and later, on the Atlantic coast as well. The fishmonger bought in the coastal ports and sold in inland markets. However, this meaning is not normally adopted into English. The name for such a trader in Britain, from 1500 to 1900 at least, was 'rippier'.

The chasse-marée name was carried over to the vehicle he used for carrying the fish, which because of the perishable nature of its load, was worked in the same urgent manner as a mail coach. Later, fast three-masted luggers were used to extend the marketing process to the purchase of fresh fish in Breton ports and on the fishing grounds. These vessels too, were known as chasse-marée. Both these meanings, particularly the latter, are used in English where, unlike the French, the plural normally takes an 's'.

== Derivation of the name ==
Une marée has the basic meaning of 'a sea tide'. Fish is a highly perishable commodity. Before the days of conservation by salting, canning or freezing, it was brought ashore as near to its market as possible. Therefore, each coastal place had its harbour or its beach on which fish were landed, originally for that community. Berths in small ports and the upper parts of beaches were accessible from the sea only towards high tide. Where estuaries allowed entry farther inland, harbours were established some way into them. Consequently, the fishermen landed their catches towards high tide; in other words the landings were half-daily events, though particularly on the morning tide. They occurred in time with la marée so the landing of fish itself came to be known also as la marée; not only the process of landing but the batch of fish too. La marée therefore, now means any of 'the tide', 'the landing of fish' or 'sea fish marketed as a fresh product'. The last is nowadays, usually taken as including shellfish.

Each of the two French words involved in the name 'chasse-marée' has a range of meanings but in this instance, they are chasser 'to impel' or 'to drive forward' and une marée, 'a landing of fresh sea fish'.

== Chasse-marée—road vehicle ==
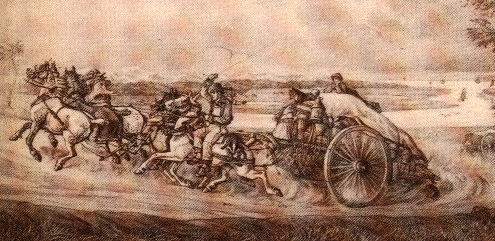
An 18th- or 19th-century lithograph

The most prolific fish such as herrings and sardines are abundant in given waters only in their season so keeping them for use out of season required salting or smoking them. This permitted their sale in inland markets too but fresh fish tasted better so long as it really was fresh. There was therefore a premium on fresh fish in this top end of the market. The medieval chasse-marée merchants catered to this originally by carrying fish in pairs of baskets on pack ponies, as far as possible, overnight. They rushed la marée (the batch from a particular landing) to market but the distance coverable before the fish deteriorated was limited. Another problem was that every lord through whose manor the road led wanted his toll so that if the road was too long, the enterprise became less economic.

Later, where the quality of the road permitted, the range might be extended by the use of charrettes (carts). When designed for this trade, with a minimum of weight put into their construction and provision for harnessing the four horses, these vehicles took the name of chasse-marée. As speed was essential, they were normally hauled by two pairs of horses. The vehicle took the form of two wheels, of a diameter large enough to minimize the slowing effect of bumps in the road. On their axle was mounted an open rectangular frame within which were slung the baskets holding the fish, packed in seaweed. More baskets were stacked above. The teams of usually fairly small horses were worked hard and changed at posting stations in the same way as those of mail coaches.

The coast supplying Paris by road was originally that which was nearest to its market, around Le Tréport and Saint-Valery-sur-Somme. At its most developed, it extended from Fécamp to Calais including such places as Dieppe, Boulogne-sur-Mer and Étaples.

== Chasse-marée—boat ==
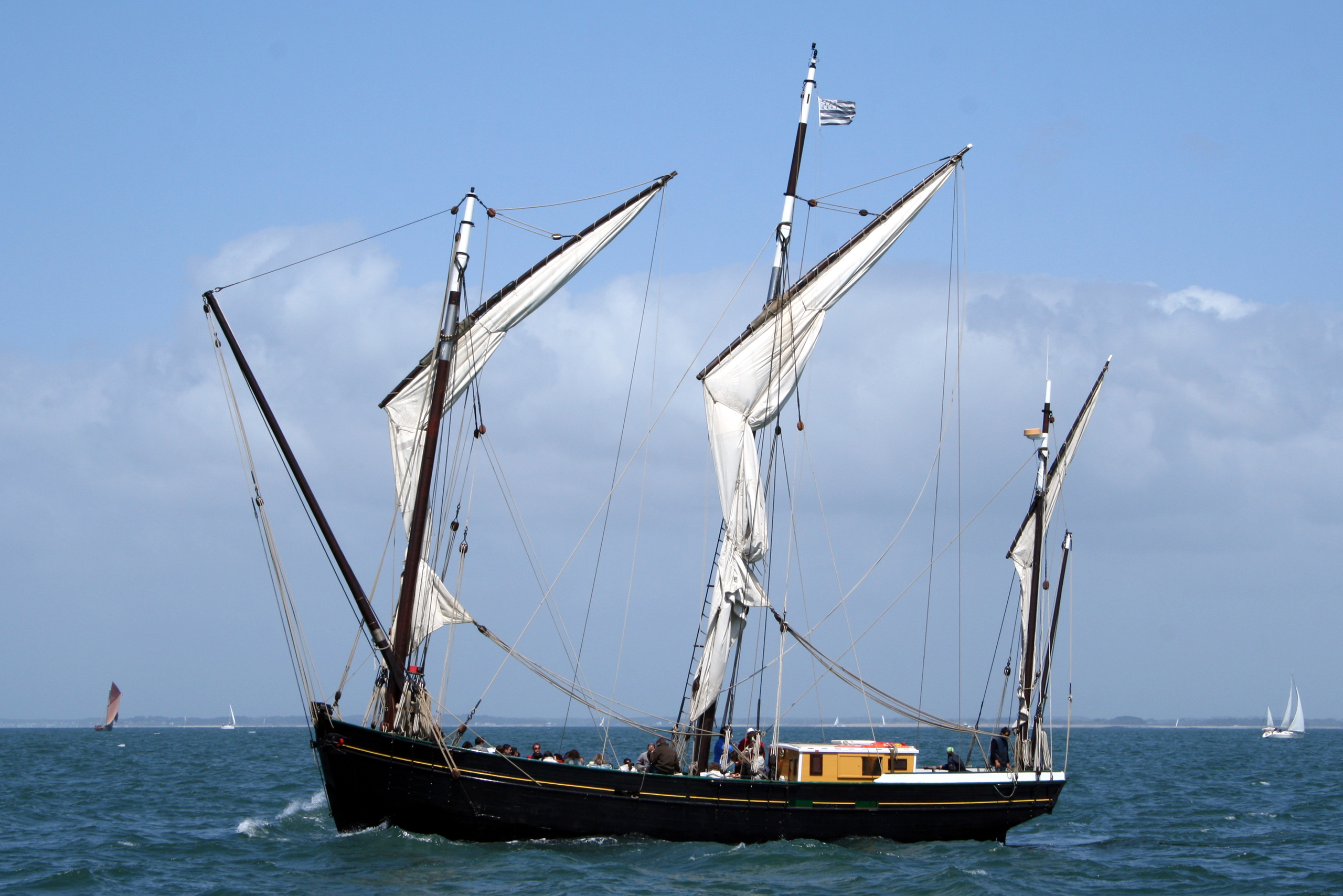
Le Corentin, a chasse-marée from Quimper. Note the three-masted lugger rig with the foremast stepped well forward and the apparent absence of headsails. The large jib has been cleared so that the bowsprit can be topped up to facilitate manoeuvring in harbour. At the after end of the vessel, the bumkin, which carries the lower block of the mizzen sheet, is similarly stowed.

On the coast of Brittany, originally in the southern part, later known as Morbihan, from the eighteenth century, fast luggers bought fish from the fishermen at sea and carried it to the Loire and Gironde for sale in the markets of Nantes and Bordeaux.

With the spread of wealth within places like Paris, the market expanded and supplies were sought from more distant coasts. In the nineteenth century, these Breton three-masted luggers began to bring fish from ports farther north on the Breton coast and from fishing boats off its coast, into the Seine estuary for sale in Rouen and for transshipment up to Paris. In such waters, a vessel without engines relied heavily on the skilful use of tides. Here, the parallel tidal meaning of marée and the catching of the tide became relevant to prosecuting the trade. It may be this which led the compiler of the Oxford English Dictionary to translate the vessel's name as 'tide-chaser'. This translation is accurate provided less-relevant meanings of the two component words are taken.

The chasse marées took return cargoes where they were available, so tended to move into the cabotage trade (coastal tramping). In particular, having taken fish south to Bordeaux, they would return with salt from Lower Charente (then known as Charente Inférieur) or from Vendée to more northerly coasts of France. Early vessels were replaced progressively by the luggers, then dundees, brigs and schooners. The rig called in French dundee is a little obscure. The Nouveau Petit Larousse Illustrée (1934) describes it only as a 'large sailing ship'. Other available dictionaries ignore it but the Mandragore II site describes it as a gaff ketch and says that the rig was used principally in lobster boats and herring drifters. The article includes an illustration showing a vessel well adapted to the chasse-marée trade, with a large sail area and strikeable bowsprit and bumkin. Apparently, the yawl rig (cotre à tapecul) used by French tunnymen was sometimes but improperly called a dundee.

== End of the trade ==
In the 1840s, when the railways reached the coasts of Picardy, Normandy and Brittany, the market changed suddenly. The railway saw to the rapid transit aspect of the trade. The chasse-marée vehicle was redundant on the main road routes but was still used more locally. The important thing then was for the fisherman to make his landing in time to catch the early morning train which took the product to the morning markets in inland towns. In order to make a living, he had to see that, with or without wind, he was ashore in time. He would therefore choose his fishing ground and the time of leaving it with a view to how the tide would carry him to the fish quay for 4 a.m. or thereabouts. Nonetheless, now that he was working to city time rather than the tide, the railway fish quay had to be accessible at all states of the tide. Over the years, the canneries took ever more of his catch so that missing the train did not represent a total loss.

The days of the chasse-marée were numbered but still the marée, in both senses, ruled the life of the longshore fishermen of the tidal French coasts. The chasse-marée boat seems to have persisted for some years by using its crew's capacity to buy on the fishing grounds and bringing the marée ashore. In that way, the vessel, designed for speed, permitted the fishing fleets to develop into working more distant waters, a process which developed further when it was possible to obtain ice and ultimately, refrigeration.

By this stage, the chasse-marée had receded into history. That process was under way when Monet painted several pictures of the boats on the lower Seine in 1872.

== Notes ==
The dictionary Le Nouveau Petit Larousse Illustrée (1934) gives the following definition: CHASSE-MARéE n: m: invar: Bâtiment côtier à trois mâts. Voiture, voiturier qui apporte la marée. That is: noun, masculine, invariable. Coastal vessel of three masts. Carriage or carrier which or who brings fresh fish.
