= HMS Pert (1804) =

Brig of the Royal Navy

History

France
- Name: Bonaparte,
- Captured: 1804

United Kingdom
- Name: HMS Pert
- Acquired: by capture 1804
- Fate: Wrecked 1807

General characteristics
- Type: Brig-sloop
- Tons burthen: 206 (Note: Although Colledge gives her burthen as 260 tons (bm), 206 tons (bm) is more consistent with the 199 tons (bm) one arrives at by calculation using the measurements both he and Winfield give.) (bm)
- Length: 84 ft 6 in (25.8 m) (overall); c.73 ft 3 in (22.3 m) (keel)
- Beam: 23 ft 0 in (7.0 m)
- Depth of hold: 11 ft 4 in (3.5 m)
- Complement: Privateer:150; Royal Navy: 70
- Armament: Privateer: 18 × 8-pounder long guns; Royal Navy: 14, or 18 × 12-pounder carronades

HMS Pert was the French privateer Bonaparte, a ship built in the United States that HMS Cyane captured in November 1804. The Royal Navy took Bonaparte into service as HMS Pert. Pert was wrecked off the coast of what is now Venezuela in October 1807.

== French privateer ==
On 21 June 1804 Bonaparte encountered the 18-gun HMS Hippomenes off Antigua. Captain Kenneth Mackenzie (or M'Kenzie) of Hippomenes took advantage of her Dutch design had disguised her as a Guinea trader. Buonaparte, of Guadeloupe, was armed with 18 long 8-pounders and a crew of 146 men under the command of Captain Paimpéni. He sighted Hippomenes and sailed to take her. The two vessels exchanged fire until Buonaparte ran into Hippomenes. Mackenzie had his crew lash the privateer's bowsprit to the mainmast and jumped on board the privateer, followed by his officers and a few men, some 18 in all. Unfortunately, the rest of the crew, a particularly poor lot, refused to follow. In the fight on the privateer, the British lost five dead and eight wounded; only nine of the original 18 managed to escape back to Hippomenes (two officers and two men remained on board Buonaparte as prisoners). The boarding party barely got back in time before the lashings gave way and the vessels parted, at which time Bonaparte sailed away. On Hippomenes his wounds rendered Mackenzie himself senseless for a while. In the engagement prior to the boarding, Buonaparte had lost five dead and 15 wounded. She then returned to Pointe-à-Pitre roads.

In about October 1804, Ceres, Bousfield, master, Penelope, Robinson, master, and Thetis, Marnley, master, were one day out of Barbados when they encountered a French privateer. An action developed in which the British merchantmen succeeded in driving off the privateer. They then gave pursuit and brought her to action again. The British succeeded in causing the privateer heavy casualties and such damage that she could not escape. However, the British did not have enough men to capture the privateer by boarding and so departed. The next day the British advised the Governor of Barbados of what had transpired. He reported that they had encountered the privateer Buonaparte, and dispatched the private man of war Barbadoes in pursuit.

On his return to England, Bousfield discovered that Marnley, of Thetis, had claimed all the credit for the repulse of Buonaparte. Bousfield wrote a letter to the Naval Chronicle, including with his letter one from Captain Painpeny (Paimpéni), of Buonaparte, that acknowledged Ceres and Bousfields's role in the action.

== Capture ==
Early in the morning of 11 November 1804, Cyane was off Marie-Galante when she encountered a French privateer brig. After a short chase and a running fight of half an hour, the brig surrendered. She had no casualties but Cyane had some men injured when a cartridge exploded on deck. The French brig was the Bonaparte, pierced for 22 guns but carrying 18. Captain George Cadogan of Cyane described Bonaparte as "a very fine Brig", but in a shattered state, having lost her foremast, bowsprit, and top-masts in an engagement with three English letters of marque three days earlier.

== Royal Navy service ==
The Royal Navy commissioned Bonaparte as HMS Pert in June 1805 under the command of Commander James Pringle. On 16 August 1806 Pert captured the schooner Catalina, Quaremberg, master. Then on 17 September Pert captured the schooner General Eaton, Robinson, master. Next, Pert shared with Jason, Hart, and Maria in the capture on 4 October, of the schooner Rebecca, Cook, master. (Note: A seaman's share of the prize money amounted to 17s 11¾d.)

On 16 February 1807 a French privateer of three guns and 70 men captured Britannia, Gibbs, master, which was sailing from London to Jamaica. The next day Pert recaptured Britannia and sent her into Barbados.

In May 1807 Commander Donald Campbell replaced Pringle.

Under Campbell's command, Pert captured four vessels in May–June:

- Brig Dorothea, Boyeson, master, 10 May
- Ship Juliana, Christensen master, 29 May
- Brig Betsey, Sounderson, master, 20 June
- Schooner Eagle, Tatein, master, 21 June

Prize money for these vessels was paid in December 1808. A second-class share was the share of a lieutenant; a fifth-class share was the share of a seaman.

Vessel	2nd class share	5th class share
Dorothea	£30 17s 9½d	£2 7s 0½d
Juliana	£8 13s 8¾d	11s 6¾d
Betsey	£4 7s 8½d	5s 3d
Eagle	£56 4s 7¼d	£3 15s 5¾d

Also in early June, on the 5th, Pert captured the schooner Caroline, Wood, master. (Note: A seaman's share of the prize money was worth 8s 4¾d.)

Then Pert and the privateer schooner Ambuscade, Captain Francis Criqui Frist, shared in the capture of the ship Commandant Von Scholten, Jelger Willems, master, on 25 June. (Note: Prize money was paid in May 1811. The share for a seaman was £2 0s 3½d.)

Pert, Maria, and Cleopatra shared in the capture of Jane, Collins, master, that same day. (Note: The share of a seaman in the prize money was 14s 8½d.)

Pert captured the schooner Johann, Benners, master, on 9 July.

On 2 August, Pert was in company with the sloop Maria when they captured the schooner Governor M'Kean.

Pert shared with Galatea in His Majesty's grant for the capture of the Danish brig Catharini, Hogens, master, on 13 October.

Latona, Circe, Galatea, Cerberus, Cygnet, Pert, and Hart, shared in His Majesty's grant for the Danish schooner Danske Patriot, Outerbridge, master, captured on 20 October. (Note: A seaman's share of the prize money was 1s 2¾d.) The vessels shared the grant for the capture as members of a squadron as on 16 October Pert was lost due to a storm.

== Fate ==
On 14 October Pert was off the coast of what is now Venezuela when she sighted a ship that she then chased. Pert caught up with her quarry off Margarita Island and captured her. The quarry turned out to be the Spanish packet Alarma, 40 days out of Ferrol and bound for the Spanish Main and Havana. Before the British could board Alarma, she sent a boat to the island of Mucana with the dispatches that she was carrying. Campbell immediately too sent a boat to the island to try to retrieve them. Campbell put the crew of Alarma into boats and sent them to Cumana under a flag of truce. While he waited for his boats to return, Campbell anchored. The weather worsened to a gale that on the morning of 16 October drove Pert on to the rocky shore of Margarita Island after her anchor cable parted. The gale pushed her onto her side, and the rocks bilged her, letting in water. The crew scrambled ashore as quickly as they could, but ten men drowned. The next morning the weather improved and Alarma rescued the survivors. Head money for the crew of Alarma, Infanzon, master, was paid in November 1810. (Note: A seaman's share was 4s 4d.)

The gale that wrecked Pert may have been part of the hurricane among the Leeward Islands that on 16 October sank Maria with the loss of her entire crew.

Pert also shared with Galatea in His Majesty's grant for the capture of the Danish brig Amalia, Dills, master, captured on 17 October.
