= Demerara (disambiguation) =

Demerara may refer to:

- Demerara, historical region in Guyana that was a Dutch colony in 17th and 18th centuries and then part of British colonies in 19th and 20th centuries
- Demerara-Essequibo, British colony created in 1812 by combining the colonies of Demerara and Essequibo
- Demerara rebellion of 1823 that took place in Demerara-Essequibo
- Demerara sugar, a natural brown sugar from Guyana
- Demerara syrup, a combination of Demerara sugar, a natural brown sugar, and water
- Demerara River, a river of Guyana
- Demerara Harbour Bridge on the Demerara River
- Demerara window, a type of window used in hot climates
- Demerara is a book written by Harriet Martineau
- HMS Demerara a mercantile schooner (previously called Anna) purchased by the British Royal Navy in 1804
- PS Demerara a paddle steamer which ran aground in 1851
- Demerara Distillers, manufacturing company in Guyana producing El Dorado Rum
- Demerara Falls tree frog (Boana cinerascens), a species of frog
- Radio Demerara, one of the oldest radio stations in Guyana
- Demerara cricket team

== See also ==
The regions of Guyana:

- Demerara-Mahaica
- Essequibo Islands-West Demerara
- Upper Demerara-Berbice
