= HMS Mosambique =

History

France
- Name: Mosambique
- Launched: 1798
- Captured: 13 March 1804

United Kingdom
- Name: HMS Mosambique
- Acquired: By capture 13 March 1804
- Honours and awards: Naval General Service Medal with clasp "Martinique"
- Fate: Sold 1810

General characteristics
- Type: schooner
- Displacement: 110 tons (French)
- Tons burthen: 112½ bm (by calculation)
- Length: 67 ft 6 in (20.6 m) (overall); 52 ft 0 in (15.8 m) (keel)
- Beam: 20 ft 2 in (6.1 m)
- Depth of hold: 8 ft 3 in (2.5 m)
- Sail plan: Schooner
- Complement: 50 (60 as privateer)
- Armament: French service: 10 × 18-pounder, or 12-pounder carronades; British service: 10 × 12-pounder carronades

HMS Mosambique was the French privateer schooner Mosambique, built in 1798, and commissioned as a privateer in 1804. The British Royal Navy captured her in 1804 and took her into service. She served in the West Indies, engaging in several indecisive single-ship actions before she captured one French privateer. She was sold there in 1810.

== Origins ==
Mosambique was built in 1798 and commissioned as a privateer in early 1804. She was cruising under the command of Captain Vallentes and provisioned for three months when captured.

== Capture ==
On the morning of 13 March 1804, Fort Diamond, the tender to Diamond Rock, was under the command of Emerald's first lieutenant, Thomas Forest. Fort Diamond weathered the Pearl Rock to bear down on a French privateer schooner, Mosambique, which had anchored close to the shore under a battery at Ceron, outside the port of Saint-Pierre, Martinique. In cooperation with Emerald and Pandour, which sent two boats each to create a diversion, Fort Diamond ran alongside the schooner, running into her at a rate of about nine knots an hour. At her approach, the schooner's crew fired a broadside and discharged some small arms before all 50 or 60 crewmen jumped overboard and swam ashore. The impact of Fort Diamond's strike broke the chain that anchored the Mosambique to shore, and the boarding party cut two cables to free her. Fort Diamond's casualties amounted to two men wounded. Mosambique turned out to be armed with ten 18-pounder carronades, though she was pierced for 14 guns. She was from Guadeloupe and under the command of Citizen Vallentes. In April 1827 head-money was distributed for the capture. (Note: A first-class share was worth £83 14s 2¼d; a fifth-class share, that of a seaman, was worth 4s 8¾d.)

The Royal Navy took her into service as HMS Mosambique.

== British service ==
The Admiralty registered Mosambique on 13 March 1804.

In January 1805, Mosambique recaptured the English sloop Experiment, which was carrying a cargo of wood. Mosambique was commissioned in 1806 under the command of Lieutenant John Campbell. That year she was returning from having escorted several vessels to Tortola to join a convoy when she encountered the French privateer Grande Decidé, of 30 guns and 250 men. The privateer tried twice to capture Mosambique, but was driven off both times. Grande Decidé eventually left after Mosambique attacked with a view to boarding, a plan that Grande Decidé's anti-boarding nets frustrated. (Note: About two years earlier, on 5 February 1804, Grande Decidé had had a similar unsuccessful encounter with the schooner Eclair. Grand Décidé was a privateer under Mathieu Goy, commissioned in Guadeloupe in January 1804.)

In 1807 Mosambique was under the command of Lieutenant John Jackson. On 31 March she recaptured Harriet, which she sent into Grenada. (Note: Harriet, Thompson, master, had been in company with Alexander on their way from Berbice and Demerara to Liverpool when on 16 March they encountered the French privateer Alerte at 26°30′N 55°00′W. Alert was armed with 20 guns and had a crew of 200 men, and succeeded in capturing both. Harriet, of 266 tons, four 4-pounder guns and six 9-pounder carrondes, had been launched at Lancaster in 1804.)

Next Mosambique fought an indecisive action with the French privateer Général Ernouf off Guadeloupe. Général Ernouf had a crew of 110 men, more than twice as many as Mosambique's 45, and 14 cannon to Mosambique's ten. Still, in the engagement General Ernouf lost some 40 men killed and wounded and was forced to break off the action, taking refuge in port, while Mosambique lost only two men.

On 29 March 1808, Cerberus, in company with Lilly, Pelican, Express, Swinger, and Mosambique, sailed from Marie-Galante to attack the island of La Désirade. They arrived on 30 March and landed seamen and marines under the command of Captain Sherriff. As the squadron approached they exchanged fire with a battery of 9-pounders covering the entrance to the harbour. The ships' guns silenced the battery and the French surrendered.

On 21 April Mosambique captured the French letter of marque brig Jean Jacques. Jean Jacques was pierced for 18 guns but carried only six long 9-pounders. She was 36 days out of Bordeaux and sailing for Guadeloupe. Captain W.H. Sherriff, of Lily, the commander of the squadron to which Mosambique belonged, reported that he was particularly pleased at the capture as the Jean Jacques had been sent out for "the express Purpose of cruising in these Seas, and, from her superior Sailing, would have proved a great Annoyance to the Trade." While Mosambique was capturing the Jean Jacques, the squadron saw a brig on fire. The squadron's boats went to the brig's assistance, extinguished the flames, and discovered that she was the Brothers of Liverpool, a prize to Jean Jacques. In the entire affair, the British had no casualties and the French suffered only one man wounded.

On 13 October Lieutenant Stephen Briggs took command of Mosambique. However, on 8 December he transferred to Grenada to take command of her.

On 20 December Admiral Alexander Cochrane appointed James Atkins, who had been Acting Master of Grenada, to the rank of Lieutenant and command of Mosambique. Under Atkins she was at the capture of Martinique. In 1847 the Admiralty authorized the issuance of the Naval General Service Medal with clasp "Martinique" to all surviving claimants from the action. The Admiralty appointed Atkins to the command of Grouper. Lieutenant Burton replaced Atkins in command of Mosambique.

== Fate ==
Mosambique was sold in 1810.
