= Shipley (1805 ship) =

1805 ship

History

United Kingdom
- Owner: 1805:Shipley Williams & Co.; 1812:George Lyall & Co.
- Builder: Whitby
- Launched: 1805
- Fate: Wrecked 19 April 1826

General characteristics
- Tons burthen: 381, 38430/94, or 388 (bm)
- Length: 107 ft 4 in (32.7 m)
- Beam: 29 ft 3 in (8.9 m)
- Complement: 1806:40; 1808:40
- Armament: 1806:18 × 12-pounder guns; 1808:22 × 12&4-pounder guns; 1810:18 × 12-pounder carronades; 1815:2 ×12-pounder + 8 × 18-pounder carronades

Shipley was a ship launched in 1805 at Whitby. A privateer captured Shipley in 1806 on what was probably her maiden voyage, but the British Royal Navy recaptured her. Between 1817 and 1823, she made four voyages transporting convicts to New South Wales. The ship was wrecked in 1826.

== Career ==
Captain John Wilson received a letter of marque for Shipley on 26 October 1805. Shipley entered the British Register of Shipping in 1806 with Wilson, master, Shipley & Co., owners, and trade Liverpool-Dominica.

Lloyd's List of 18 April 1806 reported that a 14-gun privateer had captured Shipley, but that Shipley had been recaptured and had arrived at Barbados. In February Shipley had encountered a French three-masted schooner privateer, the former HMS Demerara. Wilson and Shipley resisted for an hour and three-quarters until after he was severely wounded, as were the mate and the steward, and she had had four men killed. (The French had lost six men killed, including her second captain, and many men wounded.) The French plundered Shipley of her cargo. It was HMS Galatea that recaptured Shipley. On 25 July Shipley Williams & Co., Shipley's owners, presented Wilson with a silver cup as a token of appreciation. The cup's inscription names the French privateer as Hebe.

Captain Edward Folder (or Holder) received a letter of marque on 14 June 1808. In 1810, Shipley was still sailing between Liverpool and Dominica.

In 1812 Shipley had a new owner, Lyall, and was now a transport ship based out of London. Her master was J. Hall.

In 1816, Captain Lewis W. Moncrief assumed command of Shipley. He would remain her captain for her four voyages transporting convicts to New South Wales.

On 18 December 1816, Shipley left Portsmouth bound for Port Jackson. Almost a week earlier she had run into the transport Ocean, which had put into Portsmouth for repairs. Shipley was not much damaged. Shipley arrived at Port Jackson on 24 April 1817. She carried 125 convicts, none of whom died on the voyage. Thirty one officers and other ranks of the 46th Regiment of Foot provided the guard. Shipley left on 8 June, bound for Batavia.

Shipley left England on 19 July 1818 on her second voyage transporting convicts. She arrived at Port Jackson on 18 November. She had embarked 150 male convicts, three of whom died en route.

Shipley left for England in March 1819. She carried 226 officers and men from several regiments, as well as 23 women and 34 children.

For her third voyage transporting convicts, Shipley left the Downs on 5 June 1820. She arrived at Port Jackson on 26 September. She embarked 150 male convicts, four of whom died en route.

Between 4 and 5 November 1821, gales hit the British coasts and many vessels were damaged or lost. Shipley, at Deal, lost two anchors. Still, she left for Port Jackson two days later on her last voyage transporting convicts. She arrived at Port Jackson on 11 March 22. She had embarked male 150 convicts, of whom one died en route.

On 23–24 November 1824 gales again hit the British coasts, destroying many vessels. Shipley was at Portsmouth, bound for Valparaiso, when she was driven on shore at South Beach. She subsequently had to undergo repairs.

== Loss ==
Shipley was wrecked at Kitridge Head, Barbados. All 147 people on board were rescued. Lloyd's List reported that on 19 April 1826 the transport Shipley, from Cowes and Madeira, Abbot, master, had struck upon Cobler's Reef, drifted over, and was totally lost. However, all her crew and the troops aboard were saved.
