= Ceres (1794 Calcutta ship) =

History

Great Britain
- Name: Lutchmy
- Builder: Gabriel Gillet, Calcutta
- Launched: 1793
- Renamed: Ceres (1794)
- Fate: Last listed in 1824
- Notes: (Note: One source conflates this Ceres with Ceres.)

General characteristics
- Tons burthen: 372, or 38018/94, or 392, or 400, or 402, or 420 (bm)
- Length: 104 ft 1 in (31.7 m)
- Beam: 29 ft 6 in (9.0 m)
- Armament: 1800:2 × 6-pounder guns + 10 × 18-pounder carronades; 1805:12 × 12-pounder + 6 × 18-pounder + 2 × 24-pounder carronades
- Notes: Teak-built

Ceres was launched at Kolkata in August 1793 as Lutchmy and renamed in 1794. She sailed to England in 1798 and became a West Indiaman. She was condemned at Barbados in 1806. New owners returned her to service, first as a West Indiaman and then as an East Indiaman. She was damaged at Mauritius in 1818 and although she was listed until 1824, it is not clear that she sailed again after the damage she sustained in Mauritius.

== Origin ==
Gabriel Gillet launched Lutchmy at Calcutta in August 1793. Her sale price, completely ready for sea, was 70,000 sicca rupees (Calcutta; approx. £7,000). In 1794 she was renamed Ceres.

== Career ==
Ceres first appeared in Lloyd's Register (LR) in 1798 with Webb, master, Brockwood, owner, and trade London–Martinique. Ceres, Webb, master, sailed from Gravesend on 15 October 1798, bound for Martinico.

Year	Master	Owner	Trade	Source
1800	R.Webb	Brockwood	London–Martinique	Register of Shipping (RS)
1805	Bousfield	Rowecroft	London–Barbados	RS

=== Action ===
In September 1804 Ceres, Bousfield, master, rendezvoused with Penelope, Robinson, master, off Cork, intending to sail with the Jamaica convoy, only to find that the convoy had left. They met up with Thetis, Marnley, master, and decided to proceed to the West Indies in company. The voyage was uneventful until they were one day out of Barbados. There they encountered a French privateer. An action developed in which the British merchantmen succeeded in driving off the privateer. They then gave pursuit and brought her to action again. The British succeeded in causing the privateer heavy casualties and such damage that she could not escape. However, the British did not have enough men to capture the privateer by boarding and so departed. The next day the British advised the Governor of Barbados of what had transpired. He reported that they had encountered the privateer Buonaparte, and dispatched the private man of war Barbadoes in pursuit.

On his return to England, Bousfield discovered that Marnley, of Thetis, had claimed all the credit for the repulse of Bounaparte. Bousfield wrote a letter to the Naval Chronicle, including with his letter one from Captain Painpeny (Paimpéni), of Buonaparte, that acknowledged Ceres and Bousfields's role in the action.

Vessel	Burthen	Armament	Crew
Ceres	392	18	36
Penelope	225	16 × 6–pounder guns	22
Thetis	290	18 × 9-pounder guns	30
Buonaparte		20 × 12-pounder guns	250

=== Condemnation ===
Ceres, Bousfield, master, left Cork on 28 October 1805 in a convoy for the West Indies under escort by HMS Fisgard and Wolverine. The same night bad weather separated the convoy, which regrouped at Madeira. Fisgard collided with Ceres on 17 November off Madeira. Ceres was severely damaged and was declared a total loss on arrival at Barbados from London. A report a month later confirmed that she had been condemned. The Register of Shipping (RS), for 1806 carried the annotation "condemned" by her name.

=== Return to service ===
New owners apparently repaired Ceres and returned her to service.

Year	Master	Owner	Trade	Source
1809	S.Palmer	J.Burton	London–Jamaica	Register of Shipping (RS); small repairs 1807
1815	Smith; J.Mercer	Thompson	London–Cape of Good Hope (CGH; the Cape)	RS; small repairs 1807

In April 1807, Ceres, Palmer, master, sailed from London for Jamaica. On 18 May she sailed from Falmouth. She had put into Falmouth because she had lost the convoy she had been travelling with. She arrived at Barbados on 8 June and Jamaica on 17 June.

On her next voyage to Jamaica, Ceres, Palmer, master, had to put back after she had left Jamaica. She had returned on 21 May 1808 because of leaks.

In 1813 the EIC lost its monopoly on the trade between India and Britain. British ships were then free to sail under a license from the EIC to India, the Indian Ocean, or the East Indies.

Ceres, Herd, master, sailed from England on 5 April 1817, bound for Bombay.

On 1 March 1818 a gale hit Île de France, damaging several ships. Ceres, Heard, master, had been coming from Bengal and was driven onshore. She had cut away her mizzen mast and was leaking badly.

Year	Master	Owner	Trade	Source
1820	J.Herd	Thompson	London–CGH	RS
1820	J.Herd	Thompson	London–Île de France	LR
1824	J.Herd	Thompson	London–CGH	RS

== Fate ==
Ceres was last listed in Lloyd's Register in 1823 and in the Register of Shipping in 1824. Although she continued to be listed in the registers, it is not clear that she sailed again after the damage she had received in the gale at Mauritius.
