= HMS Maria (1805) =

1805 schooner

History

United Kingdom
- Name: HMS Maria (or Marie)
- Acquired: By capture 21 June 1805
- Commissioned: 1806
- Fate: Foundered October 1807

General characteristics
- Type: Schooner
- Tons burthen: 130 bm
- Length: 72 ft 0 in (21.95 m) (overall); c.60 ft 6 in (18.4 m) (keel)
- Beam: 20 ft 1 in (6.12 m)
- Depth of hold: 8 ft 4 in (2.54 m)
- Propulsion: Sails
- Sail plan: Schooner
- Complement: 46
- Armament: 12 × 12-pounder carronades

HMS Maria (or Marie) was the French privateer schooner Constance (or Constanza) that the Royal Navy captured in 1805 and that foundered in 1807. During her brief career in the Leeward Islands she participated in the capture of five small prizes.

== Capture ==
On 21 June 1805, Circe captured the privateer Constance in the Leeward Islands. Constance was armed with 10 guns and had a crew of 75 men. She was just out of Guadeloupe. However, she may have been the same Constance that Circe had earlier captured off the coast of Spain.

== Service ==
The Admiralty registered her on 10 November and purchased her on 2 December. The Admiralty named her Maria and she was commissioned under Lieutenant John Henderson.

On 9 June 1806 Maria was in company with a small squadron that also included Galatea, Africaine, Circe, Hippomenes, and Amelia when they captured the brig Hiram. At the time, Maria was under the command of Lieutenant James Fitzpatrick, apparently temporarily. (Note: A petty officer's share of the prize money was £1 11s 2¼d; a seaman's share was 6s 7¾d.) On 6 August, Maria was in company with Jason, Hart, and the schooner Tobago when they captured Hercules.

Cleopatra, the sloop Pert, and Maria shared in the capture of Jane, Collins, master, on 25 June 1807. (Note: The share of a seaman in the prize money was 14s 8½d.)

On 26 July 1807, His Majesty's schooners Maria, under Henderson's command, and Grouper captured the schooner Atlantic. (Note: Each ordinary seaman's share of the prize money was 15s 9¾d, or a little over two weeks' wages.) On 2 August, Maria was in company with Pert when they captured the schooner Governor M'Kean. Then on 4 October, Maria was in company with Jason, Hart, and Pert when they captured the schooner Rebecca. (Note: A seaman's share of the prize money amounted to 17s 11¾d.) However the prize money for these vessels arrived in 1809, too late to be of much use to Maria's crew.

== Fate ==
Maria was under Henderson's command when she foundered during a hurricane among the Leeward Islands on 16 October 1807. There were no survivors. On the same day a storm wrecked Pert on the coast of present-day Venezuela.
