= HMS Coureuse =

History

France
- Name: Coureuse
- Builder: New York
- Launched: Circa 1785
- Acquired: Purchased at Cayenne April 1794
- Commissioned: June 1794 at Lorient
- Captured: 26 February 1795

Great Britain
- Name: HMS Coureuse
- Acquired: 26 February 1795 by capture
- Fate: Sold April 1799

General characteristics
- Type: Schooner
- Displacement: 33 tons (French)
- Tons burthen: 5585/94 (bm), or 18 (French; "of load")
- Length: Overall: 55 ft 10 in (17.0 m); Keel: 41 ft 11 3/8 in (12.8 m)
- Beam: 15 ft 9 in (4.8 m)
- Depth of hold: 6 ft 5 in (2.0 m)
- Propulsion: Sails
- Sail plan: Schooner
- Complement: French service: 23; British service: 35
- Armament: French service: 8 × 2-pounder guns; British service: 2 × 24-pounder carronades + 12 × ½-pounder swivel guns

HMS Coureuse was a schooner launched in about 1785 at New York, that the French Navy acquired at Cayenne and armed and commissioned at Lorient in 1794. The British captured her in 1795 and the Royal Navy briefly used her as a dispatch vessel in the Mediterranean. The Admiralty sold her in 1799.

== Origins ==
The French Revolution had a positive effect on the design and construction of schooners. Coureuse provides one of the few remaining early draughts, which was taken off at Plymouth dockyard in June 1795.

The British prize court stated that she had been built in New York in 1785, and that as far as it was aware, had always borne the name Coureuse. She was built to pilot boat lines, though she may or may not have been built as a pilot boat. (Note: Cunliffe has a description, a copy of the lines, and the dimensions.)

== French service ==
Coureuse sailed out to Cayenne, and back to Lorient under the command of Lieutenant de Vaisseau Malvin (acting). (Note: Actually, the rank was "Lieutenant de vaisseau non entretenu", where "non entrentenu" means "not paid", or "without a salary". The rank was that of Lieutenant, but junior to "Lieutenant de vaisseau entretenu". In addition to not being paid, an officer "non entretenu" would wear the uniform and have authority only when on service. There was a fixed number of positions for "entretenus", which required a competitive examination, while there was an unlimited number of "non entretenus", and one could obtain the status by a simple examination or by captaining a merchantman.)

In February 1795 Coureuse, under the command of Enseigne de vaisseau Landais (acting), was escorting a convoy of three brigs and two luggers carrying clothes for the Army from Île-Tudy to Île de Groix when the convoy had the misfortune to encounter a squadron under Captain Sir John Borlase Warren in Pomone. Pomone captured all six vessels. At the time of her capture her captors described Curieuse (name latter corrected to Coureuse) as a schooner belonging to the National Convention government and carrying eight brass guns.

The frigates Artois, Galatea and Anson, and the hired armed lugger Duke of York assisted Pomone in the capture. The British latter scuttled two of the brigs of little value that they had captured from the convoy, but took the other four vessels as prizes, with Coureuse being taken into service.

== British service ==
The Royal Navy fitted Coureuse out between June and July 1795, and registered her on 22 July. She then briefly served as a dispatch vessel in the Mediterranean.

== Fate ==
Coureuse was offered for sale at Plymouth in March 1799. She was sold on 13 April for £125 to Mr. Dodds.
