= Britannia (1798 Kirkcaldy ship) =

History

Great Britain
- Name: Britannia
- Builder: Kirkcaldy
- Launched: 1798
- Captured: 1st: 16 February 1807; 2nd: 11 October 1812

General characteristics
- Tons burthen: 211 (bm)
- Armament: 1801: 2 × 4-pounder guns + 4 × 12-pounder carronades; 1808: 2 guns

Britannia was launched at Kirkcaldy in 1798. she spent her career as a West Indiaman. In 1807 a French privateer captured her, but the British Royal Navy recaptured her the next day. Finally, an American privateer captured her in October 1812.

== Career ==
Britannia entered Lloyd's Register (LR) in 1799. The entry simply gave her origin as Scotland.

Year	Master	Owner	Trade	Source
1799	A.Smith	M'Neil	Leith–Jamaica	LR
1801	A.Smith	A.Stewart	Leith–Jamaica	Register of Shipping (RS)
1806	C.Brown; D.Gibb	Hurry & Co. Dist & Co.	Greenock–Jamaica; London–Jamaica	LR
1808	Thompson	Bissett & Co.	London–Jamaica	LR

On 16 February 1807 a French privateer of three guns and 70 men captured Britannia, Gibbs, master, which was sailing from London to Jamaica. The next day HMS Pert recaptured Britannia and sent her into Barbados.

Year	Master	Owner	Trade	Source
1809	Gibbs	Bisset	London–Jamaica	RS
1811	T.Gibbs; J.Eddington	Bisset	London–Jamaica; Portsmouth	RS
1812	J.Eddington	Bisset	Portsmouth–Jamaica	RS

== Fate ==
On 3 September 1812 the United States privateer Wily Renard captured Britannia, of Portsmouth, Edington, master.

HMS Shannon encountered and subsequently captured Wily Reynard on 11 October and took her to Halifax, Nova Scotia. (Note: Wiley Reynard, of Boston, W.Lane, master, was a schooner of 22 tons (bm), one gun, and 24 men.)
