= HMS Tobago (1805) =

British schooner

United Kingdom
- Name: HMS Tobago
- Acquired: 1805 by purchase
- Fate: Captured October 1806

France
- Name: Vengeur
- Acquired: By capture 1806
- Captured: January 1809

United Kingdom
- Name: HMS Vengeur
- Acquired: By capture January 1809
- Fate: Sold 1809

General characteristics
- Tons burthen: 120, or 127 bm
- Propulsion: Sails
- Sail plan: Schooner
- Armament: Tobago: 10 guns; Vengeur: 16 guns

HMS Tobago was a schooner of unknown origin that the British Royal Navy purchased in 1805. In 1806 a French privateer captured her. The Royal Navy recaptured her in 1809 and took her into service as HMS Vengeur before selling her later that year.

== Career ==
Lieutenant Donald Campbell was appointed 20 February 1805 to command the schooner that the Royal Navy had purchased and named Tobago. Campbell participated in a successful attack made in company with Curieux on two merchantmen, lying for protection under the batteries at Barcelona, on the coast of Caraccas. Campbell left Tobago in July.

Lieutenant John Salomon (acting) assumed command of Tobago towards the close of 1805. He had commanded the prison ship Amboyna. (Note: Earlier, he had been master (acting) of Eclair. In Eclair he participated in a notable engagement in which Eclair repulsed the French privateer Grande Decide, and he led a cutting out party that succeeded in capturing a French schooner against heavy odds. Grand Décidé was a privateer under Mathieu Goy, commissioned in Guadeloupe in January 1804. She had a crew of 220 men and was armed with twenty-two 8-pounder guns.) Tobago then spent some months sailing between Grenada, Barbados, and Guadeloupe exchanging prisoners of war.

On 6 August Tobago was in company with Jason, Hart, and the schooner Maria when they captured Hercules.

=== Capture ===
Before dawn on 18 October 1806 Tobago left Dominica where she had been replenishing her water supplies. Soon after, Salmon sighted a brig, joined by a schooner and a sloop, that all made towards Tobago. Tobago prepared for action, while attempting to steer away from the probably hostile squadron. The enemy closed by 8:30, with the schooner and sloop exchanging fire with Tobago. The French attempted to board, but Tobago repulsed the attempt. She was not able to escape though, and the French schooner was able to get her jib-boom over Tobago's taffrail and rake her with small arms fire. Salmon received a shot in the head and his men took him below decks. Sub-Lieutenant Nichols Gould assumed command and continued the fight for another half-hour but then, with Tobago having lost one man killed and 15 wounded (including Salmon), was forced to strike. Her captor was the French privateer General Ernouf, of 16 guns. Général Ernouf (1805–1808), was a Danish 16-gun brig, originally under the command of the notable French privateer captain Alexis Grassin. Tabago sold for 15,300 francs at Guadeloupe.

On 24 June 1807 Salmon received promotion to the rank of Lieutenant after his release and repatriation.

=== Recapture ===
On 24 January 1809 Beagle was in the English Channel when she captured Vengeur, of 16 guns and 48 men. Vengeur was in company with Grand Napoleon, which escaped. (Note: Grand Napoléon was a privateer commissioned in Boulogne in March 1806. She under a captain Huret from January to February 1808, and later under a captain Fourmentin. HMS Helena captured her on 19 April 1810.) Vengeur herself did not surrender until Beagle came alongside, though her captain, M. Bourgnie, was wounded. Vengeur had made no captures. Vengeur was the former Tobago. (Note: Vengeur was a privateer from Boulogne, commissioned in November 1808, and probably a brig. She was of 120 tons (French; of load), 74 men, and 17 guns, under Jacques Bourgain.)

== Disposal ==
The Royal Navy took Vengeur into service as HMS Vengeur, but sold her within the year.
