= Hired armed lugger Duke of York =

Sailing vessel hired into service with the Royal Navy

History

Great Britain
- Name: Duke of York
- Acquired: 14 October 1794
- Fate: Foundered in the North Sea on 2 January 1799

General characteristics
- Tons burthen: 57 or 5744/94 (bm)
- Sail plan: Lugger
- Armament: 8 × 4-pounder guns

His Majesty's Hired armed lugger Duke of York served the Royal Navy from 14 October 1794 to 2 January 1799 when she foundered in the North Sea.

== Service with the Royal Navy ==
She may have been the lugger by the same name that on 28 October 1793 received a letter of marque. That Duke of York was described as being under the command of Richard Mowle, having a burthen of 54 tons, being armed with six 4-pounder guns and six swivels, and having a crew of 23.

On 31 January 1795, the hired armed lugger Duke of York was part of a squadron under Captain Sir John Borlase Warren that seized the Dutch East India Ship Ostenhuyson.

On 26 February, Pomone, under Captain Warren, captured a 12-gun schooner off the Île de Groix, near Lorient. The schooner was the French Convention navy, American-built, Coureuse, and she was escorting a convoy of three brigs and two luggers from Brest to Lorient. The frigates Artois and Galatea, and Duke of York assisted Pomone in the capture. The British scuttled two of the brigs that were of little value, but took the other four vessels as prizes, with Coureuse being taken into service briefly as a dispatch vessel in the Mediterranean. (Note: Chapelle reports that Coureuse only had eight guns, and 2-pounders at that.)

In 1796, Duke of York sailed with Captain Sir Edward Pellew's squadron. The squadron captured or sank a number of merchant vessels between ll and 21 March.

- Favorite Sultana, laden with salt—captured;
- Friends, brig, laden with flour—captured;
- Brig of unknown name, in ballast—sunk;
- Chasse maree of unknown name, empty—sunk;
- Providence, chasse maree, laden with wine and brandy—captured;
- Brig of unknown name, laden with empty casks—sunk;
- Four Marys, brig, in ballast—captured;
- Aimable Justine, brig, in ballast—captured;
- Nouvelle Union, brig, in ballast—captured.

The vessels sharing in the prize money were: Indefatigable, Concorde, Révolutionnaire, Amazon, Argo, the hired armed cutter Dolly, and Duke of York.

On 13 April 1796 Revolutionnaire, one of Pellew's squadron, captured the French frigate Unité. Then on 21 April Indefatigable captured the 44-gun French frigate Virginie off the Lizard. In July there was an initial distribution of prize money for the capture of Unite and Virginie of £20,000. Indefatigable shared this with Amazon, Revolutionnaire, Concorde, and Argo. Apparently Duke of York too shared in some or all of the prize money.

In December 1796 Duke of York, under the command of Mr. Benjamin Sparrow, was still cruising with Pellew's small squadron of frigates off Brest, reporting the movements of the French fleet to the admiral of the British fleet, then cruising some distance of the Ushant. Between 16–17 December Duke of York observed the French fleet assemble after its departure from Brest and on the 17th Pellew sent her to Falmouth with despatches to report the news. She arrived in Falmouth on 20 December, followed closely by Pellew in Indefatigable.

On 11 May 1797 Indefatigable, in company with Phoebe, Cleopatra, Childers, and Duke of York, captured Nouvelle Eugénie. She was a razee privateer of 16 guns and carried a crew of 120 men. She was four days out of Nantes on a 30-day cruise, but had taken no prizes. The Navy took her into service as HMS Eugenie.

In July 1797 Duke of York shared in the capture of a French privateer in the Channel. The privateer's name was not recorded, but she was armed with two guns and had a crew of 25. Duke of York had chased the French vessel into the hands of the revenue cutter Hind, which also retook a sloop the privateer had captured.

On 28 January 1798, Indefatigable and Cambrian captured the privateer Heureuse Nouvelle. She was armed with 22 guns and had a crew of 130 men. She was 36 days out of Brest and during that time had taken only one ship, a large American vessel named Providence, which had a cargo of cotton and sugar. Pellew sent Cambrian in pursuit. Duke of York also shared in the capture.

== Fate ==
On 2 January 1799, Duke of York was under the command of Master Benjamin Sparrow when she foundered in the North Sea.
