= Alexander (1806 ship) =

History

United States
- Launched: 1801
- Fate: Sold? 1806

United Kingdom
- Acquired: 1806
- Fate: Last listed 1816

General characteristics
- Tons burthen: 313, or 314, or 317 (bm)
- Complement: 1806:40; 1808:2540
- Armament: 1806:4 × 6-pounder guns + 2 × 18-pounder carronades + 10 × 12-pounder carronades; 1808:4 × 6-pounder guns + 2 × 18-pounder + 10 × 12-pounder carronades; 1809: 16 × 9&6-pounder cannons; 1811:8 × 6-pounder guns

Alexander was launched in 1801 in the United States, possibly under another name. She became a slave ship in the triangular trade in enslaved people, sailing from Liverpool. A French privateer captured her after she had landed her captives at Berbice. Alexander returned to British ownership and became a West Indiaman, and then a transport. She was last listed in 1816 but may have been sold or broken up in 1815.

== Career ==
Alexander first appeared in Lloyd's Register in 1806.

Year	Master	Owner	Trade	Source & notes
1806	R.Prince	Pickup & Co.	Liverpool–Africa	LR

Although LR gave Alexander's master's name as Prince, it was actually Pince. Captain Robert Pince acquired a letter of marque on 6 May 1806.

Captain Robert Pince sailed from Liverpool on 10 June 1806 to acquire captives in West Africa. Alexander arrived at Berbice on 20 December with 347 captives. She had left Liverpool with 42 crew members and she had suffered eight crew deaths on the voyage. She sailed for Liverpool on 17 February 1807.

The French privateer Alert, of 20 guns and 150–200 men, captured, Alexander, Pince, master, and Ann, Strahan, master, both of Liverpool, and took them into Guadeloupe. Alert also captured Harriet, Thompson, master, of Lancaster, but HMS Mosambique recaptured Harriet. In the engagement with Alerte at 26°15′N 58°10′W, Alexander suffered four men killed and Captain Pince and four men wounded before Alexander struck. After she captured Alexander, Alerte captured Harriet. Alerte was the former Otway.

By one study, in 1807, twelve British vessels involved in transporting enslaved people were lost, with none being lost while homeward bound. This study obviously missed Alexander, perhaps because Lloyd's List did not describe Alexander as a homeward-bound Guineaman. During the period 1793 to 1807, war, rather than maritime hazards or resistance by the captives, was the greatest cause of vessel losses among British enslaving vessels.

Alexander quickly returned to British ownership, though it is not entirely clear how. She may have been the "English Ship Alexander, laden with Indigo, Cotton, Copper, and Dry Wood" that the Royal Navy captured in the harbour on 21 December 1807 when the Danish island of Saint Thomas capitulated to the forces under Rear-Admiral the Honourable Sir Alexander Cochrane.

Captain Josiah Perrin acquired a letter of marque on 23 September 1808.

Year	Master	Owner	Trade	Source & notes
1808	R.Prince; Perrin	Pickup & Co.	Liverpool–Africa	LR
1809	J.Perrin	Lancaster	Liverpool–Brazil	LR
1810	T.Perrin	Lancaster	Liverpool–West Indies	RS; small repairs 1808

In the middle of March 1810, an Alexander was on shore near Rio Grande. She was on her way from Liverpool to Pernambuco. Earlier, on 11 October 1809, Alexander, of Liverpool, Pince [sic], master, had arrived at Rio de Janeiro from Liverpool.

Year	Master	Owner	Trade	Source
1811	Perrin; Surflen	Lancaster	Liverpool–Martinique; London transport	LR;
1816	Surflin	Dodd	London Transport	LR

Alexander, Surflen, master, last appeared in Lloyd's List's ship arrival and departure data as sailing from Cork on 18 January 1815, bound for Bermuda together with a number of other vessels. Alexander was last listed in 1816.

By early 1816 Captain Surflen was master of a different Alexander, sailing to India.
