= HMS Grouper =

History

United Kingdom
- Name: HMS Grouper
- Ordered: 23 June 1803
- Builder: Goodrich & Co. (prime contractor), Bermuda
- Laid down: 1803
- Launched: 1804
- Honours and awards: Naval General Service Medal with clasp "Guadaloupe"
- Fate: Wrecked 21 October 1811

General characteristics
- Type: Ballahoo-class schooner
- Tons burthen: 70 41/94 (bm)
- Length: 55 ft 2 in (16.8 m) (overall); 40 ft 10 1/2 in (12.5 m) (keel)
- Beam: 18 ft 0 in (5.5 m)
- Depth of hold: 9 ft 0 in (2.7 m)
- Sail plan: Schooner
- Complement: 20
- Armament: 4 × 12-pounder carronades

HMS Grouper was a Royal Navy Ballahoo-class schooner of four 12-pounder carronades and a crew of 20. The prime contractor for the vessel was Goodrich & Co., in Bermuda, and she was launched in 1804. Grouper was wrecked off Guadeloupe in 1811. This schooner was the only Royal Navy ship ever to use the name.

== Service ==
She was commissioned at Bermuda under Lieutenant Provo Hughes for the Leeward Islands. In 1807 her commander was Lieutenant Charles Chester Fitch. On 8 June 1807 Grouper captured the schooner Sophia. (Note: Each ordinary seaman's share of the prizemoney was 10s 10 1/4d, or a little over ten days wages.)

On 26 July 1807 His Majesty's schooners Grouper and Maria captured the schooner Atlantic. (Note: Each ordinary seaman's share of the prize money was 15s 9 3/4d, or a little over two weeks wages.)

On 12 August 1809 she came under the command of Lieutenant James Atkins. Grouper participated in the capture of Guadeloupe and its dependencies in February 1810 and was engaged in the protection of trade. In 1847 her surviving crew members would qualify for the Naval General Service Medal with clasp "Guadaloupe".

== Wreck ==
Grouper was wrecked on a reef off Guadeloupe on 21 October 1811. At 5am she struck a reef three miles northwest of Carret Island, which lies to the west of Baie-Mahault. Her crew made rafts of the wreckage and abandoned Grouper. One marine drowned but the rest of the crew survived as she went to pieces after daybreak. Some fisherman rescued Atkins from a piece of wreckage after he had been knocked about for some five hours. When rescued he was insensible from lacerations he had suffered.

The subsequent court martial on 7 February 1812 reprimanded Atkins for his want of caution in letting Grouper lie too close to land. However, the board blamed the loss on the neglect of Midshipman Angus McLeod, the officer of the watch. He had neglected to post a look-out and had continued to sail though his orders were to lay-to. McLeod was not punished as he had deserted, along with the quartermaster of the morning watch, when the survivors were landed at Pointe-à-Pitre.

In June 1812, after the injuries he sustained on Grouper, the wounds he had suffered as Acting Master on Grenada, and 12 years in the West Indies, Atkins returned to England as a passenger on Gloire. On 14 November Atkins was appointed to the 74-gun Clarence, which had been launched in April.
