= HMS Hart (1805) =

History

France
- Launched: 1789
- Renamed: Empereur (1804)
- Captured: 30 April 1805

History

United Kingdom
- Name: HMS Hart
- Namesake: Hart (deer)
- Acquired: April 1805 by capture
- Fate: Sold 1810

General characteristics
- Tons burthen: 15187/94, or 160 (bm)
- Length: Overall:68 ft 0 in (20.7 m); Keel:63 ft 9 in (19.4 m)
- Beam: 21 ft 2 in (6.5 m)
- Depth of hold: 10 ft 9 in (3.3 m)
- Sail plan: Brig
- Complement: 82 (privateer)
- Armament: Privateer: 14 × 6-pounder guns; Royal Navy: 16 × 12-pounder carronades

HMS Hart was a French schooner launched in 1789 that in 1804 was renamed Empereur and that cruised as a privateer out of Guadeloupe. The British Royal Navy captured Empereur in 1805 and took her into service. She captured numerous small merchant vessels and participated in the capture of the Danish West Indies in December 1807. The Navy sold her in 1810.

== Capture ==
On the evening of 3 April 1805 the 74-gun third-rate Eagle was cruising with a squadron when she broke away in chase of a schooner. Eagle caught up with the schooner at around midnight and captured her. The schooner was the French privateer Empereur, of 14 guns and 82 men. She was 42 days out of Guadeloupe but had captured nothing. Captain David Colby of Eagle described Empereur as "a very fine Vessel of her Description, coppered and sails well". Eagle brought her into Carlisle Bay, Barbados; the Royal Navy took her into service as HMS Hart.

== Royal Navy ==
Commander John Ellis Watt commissioned Hart in March 1806.

On 4 August Hart captured the schooner Hannah, Eldridge, master. (Note: A seaman's share was worth £1 8s 0 1/4d.)

On 6 August Hart was in company with Jason, Maria, and Tobago when they captured Hercules.

Commander William Coombe was to replace Watt in early 1807. As first lieutenant of HMS Galatea, Coombe had led the boats that on 21 January 1807 captured French corvette Lynx in a notable action. The surviving British officers received promotions. Coombe was promoted to commander but received an appointment as captain of Hart, not Lynx. Hart was a lesser vessel than Lynx and Coombe complained to the admiral of the station and then to the Admiralty. The Admiralty reversed the appointments, which led to Coombe fighting a duel with the relegated captain. Coombe commissioned HMS Heureux, the former Lynx, in April 1807. (Note: Coombe was killed in the early morning of 29 November 1808 while captain of Heureux.)

It is not clear when Coombe replaced Watt. Prize money notices are ambiguous.

On 21 September Hart, Commander William Coombe, captured the Danish brig Adventure, Colin, master.

Galatea and Hart, Commander Coombe ("Deceased"), shared in the prize money for the capture on 1 October 1807 of the schooner John and Joseph, Hansen, master.

On 4 October, Hart. Commander Watt, was in company with Jason, Maria, and Pert when they captured the schooner Rebecca. (Note: A seaman's share of the prize money amounted to 17s 11 3/4d.)

Cerberus, and Hart, William Coombe ("late Commander"), shared the prize money for the galiot Mary, Durham, master, captured on 10 October.

Hart, Latona, Circe, Galatea, Cerberus, Cygnet, and Pert shared in His Majesty's grant for the Danish schooner Danske Patriot, Outerbridge, master, captured on 20 October. The prize money notice gave the name of Hart's commander as William Coombe. (Note: A seaman's share of the prize money was 1s 2 3/4d.)

On 15 December 1807 HMS Fawn arrived at Barbados with the news of war with Denmark. Admiral Cochrane immediately set sail for the Danish West Indies in his flagship, HMS Belleisle, together with a squadron including Prince George, Northumberland, Canada, Ramillies, Cerberus, Ethalion, and a number of other vessels, including Hart. The expedition included troops from the 70th and 90th Regiments of Foot under the overall army commander, General Henry Bowyer.

St Thomas surrendered on 22 December and St Croix on 25 December. A prize money notice in the London Gazette in 1816 gives a list of the vessels, and the army units that participated in the campaign. (Note: The two commanders-in-chief each received £1293 3s 5 3/4d. A naval captain or commander received a first-class share, which was worth £398 10s 3 1/2d. A fifth-class share, that of a seaman, was worth £1 18s 10d.)

Hart no longer appeared in prize money or other notices in the London Gazette for events after December 1807.

== Fate ==
The Navy sold Hart in 1810.
