= Ceres (1787 Ipswich ship) =

History

Great Britain
- Name: Ceres
- Namesake: Ceres - the Roman goddess of agriculture
- Owner: 1821:Wilkinson
- Builder: Ipswich
- Launched: 1787
- Fate: Wrecked late 1822

General characteristics
- Tons burthen: 67, or 68 (bm)
- Propulsion: Sail
- Sail plan: Brig

Ceres was launched at Ipswich in 1787. Her career between 1787 and 1818 is currently obscure. From 1818 she made two voyages as a whaler in the British Southern Whale Fishery. On 28 August 1821 she was wrecked on the island of Tanameira, the South Pacific. The inhabitants murdered Captain Lancaster and seven of his crew.

1st whaling voyage (1818-1819): Ceres sailed in 1818. Reported 4 May 1819 at Rio de Janeiro on 11 January 1819.

Ceres appeared in the Register of Shipping (RS) in 1821 with Kingston, master, Wilkinson, owner, and trade London-South Seas. She had undergone a good repair in 1817.

2nd whaling voyage (1819): Ceres sailed from England on 28 April 1820. She was lost at Tonomia (Tongan Islands) [Hapaee i.e. Lifuka] in late 1822.
