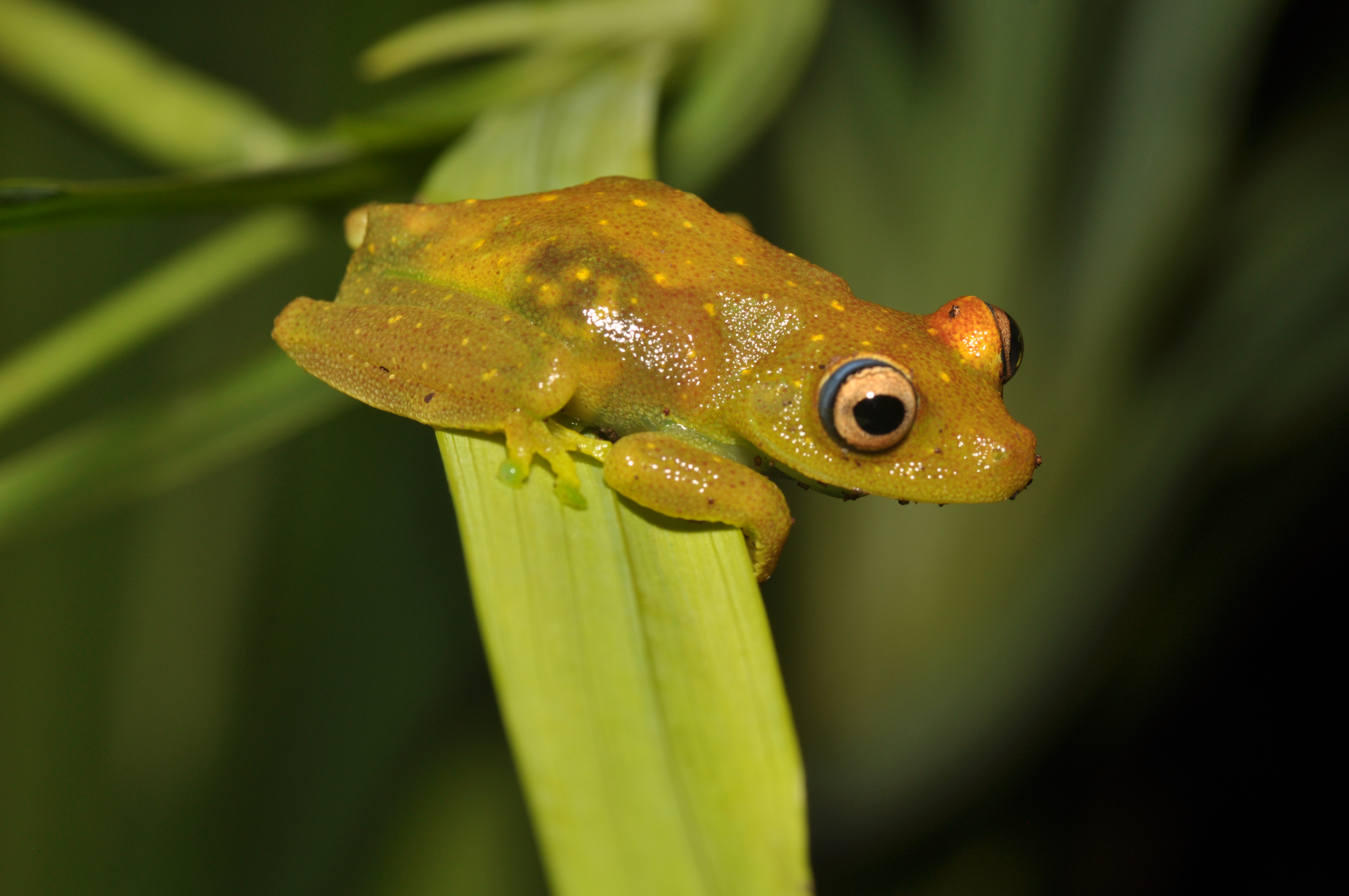

Conservation status
- Least Concern (IUCN 3.1)

Scientific classification
- Kingdom: Animalia
- Phylum: Chordata
- Class: Amphibia
- Order: Anura
- Family: Hylidae
- Genus: Boana
- Species: B. cinerascens

Binomial name
- Boana cinerascens (Spix, 1824)

Synonyms
- Hyla granosa Boulenger, 1882; Hyla inornata Lutz, 1973; Hypsiboas cinerascens (Spix, 1824)

= Demerara Falls tree frog =

Species of amphibian

The Demerara Falls tree frog (Boana cinerascens) is a species of frog in the family Hylidae found in Bolivia, Brazil, Colombia, Ecuador, French Guiana, Guyana, Peru, Suriname, and Venezuela. Its natural habitats are subtropical or tropical moist lowland forests, subtropical or tropical swamps, rivers, freshwater marshes, intermittent freshwater marshes, rural gardens, and heavily degraded former forests.

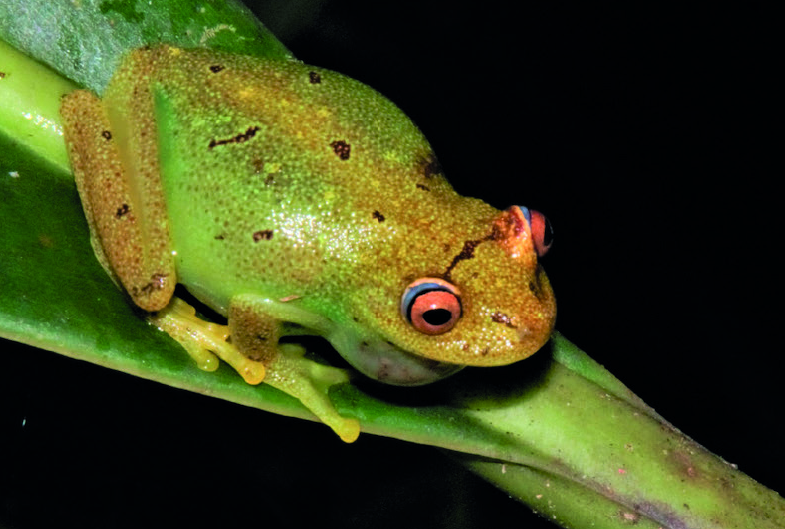
Amapá, Brazil
