= HMS Jason (1804) =

Frigate of the Royal Navy

History

United Kingdom
- Name: HMS Jason
- Namesake: Jason, of Greek Mythology
- Ordered: 12 July 1804
- Builder: Woolwich Dockyard
- Laid down: August 1804
- Launched: 21 November 1804
- Fate: Broken up in July 1815

General characteristics
- Class & type: 32-gun fifth rate Thames-class frigate
- Tons burthen: 657 (bm)
- Length: 127 ft (39 m) (overall); 107 ft 4 in (32.72 m) (keel)
- Beam: 34 ft 6 in (10.52 m)
- Depth of hold: 11 ft 9 in (3.58 m)
- Complement: 220
- Armament: Upper deck: 26 × 12-pounder guns; QD: 8 × 24-pounder carronades; Fc: 4 × 24-pounder carronades

HMS Jason was a 32-gun fifth rate Thames-class frigate of the Royal Navy, launched in 1804 at Woolwich. She was broken up in 1815.

== Service ==
Jason entered service in 1805 under the command of Captain P. William Champain, and served in the Leeward Islands as the flagship of Admiral Sir Alexander Cochrane.

On 10 August 1805 Jason captured the Spanish privateer Dolores. (Note: A first-class share of the prize money was worth £30 9s 8¼d; a fifth-class share, that of a seaman, was worth 2s 4¾d.)

On 13 October Jason captured the French corvette Naiade off Barbados after a chase of nine hours. She was pierced for 22 guns, but mounted sixteen long 12-pounders and four brass 2-pound swivels. She had a crew of 170 men under the command of lieutenant de vaisseau Hamon, and had had one man killed before she surrendered. She had come out from France the previous March with the Toulon squadron and was 15 days out of Martinique on a two-month cruise. Captain P.W. Champain of Jason described her as, "one of the largest Brigs in the French Service; extremely well fitted, fails very fast, (having escaped from many of our Cruizers,) and appears particularly calculated for His Majesty's Service." That same day Jason captured the Spanish merchant ship Three Brothers. (The Royal Navy took Naiade into service as HMS Melville.)

In 1806, command of Jason passed to Captain Thomas John Cochrane. In June she participated in an attack on a Spanish gun battery at Aguadilla on Puerto Rico. Although the attacking force came under heavier fire than expected, the British were eventually able to capture the battery. On 6 August, Jason was in company with Hart, and the schooners Maria and Tobago when they captured Hercules.

In 1807, Jason was detached, together with the brig Wolverine, to the coast of Surinam to search for the French sloop Favorite, which she discovered in January and captured in a short engagement. Favorite had been a Royal Navy sloop that the French had captured in January 1806; the Royal Navy took her back into service as HMS Goree. (Note: A portion of the head money was paid in August 1817. A first-class share was worth £267 15s; a fifth-class share, that of a seaman, was worth 16s 2½d.)

In 1808 Jason was involved in a mutiny off New York City, when local inhabitants persuaded a shore party to revolt. The rebellion spread to the ship and it was only with difficulty that the officers subdued the mutineers, the first lieutenant driving them below with a pike and locking them in; 45 men were later court martialled at Halifax, Nova Scotia.

In 1809 command passed to Captain William Maude and Jason participated in the attack on the Topaze off Guadeloupe in the successful Action of 22 January 1809.

In April 1809, a strong French squadron arrived at the Îles des Saintes, south of Guadeloupe. There they were blockaded until 14 April, when a British force under Major-General Frederick Maitland and Captain Philip Beaver in Acasta, invaded and captured the islands. Jason was among the naval vessels that shared in the proceeds of the capture of the islands. (Note: The prize agent for a number of the vessels involved, Henry Abbott, went bankrupt. In May 1835 there was a final payment of a dividend from his estate. A first-class share was worth 10s 2¾d; a sixth-class share, that of an ordinary seaman, was worth 1d. Seventh-class (landsmen) and eighth-class (boys) shares were fractions of a penny, too small to pay.)

Command later passed to James William King and then Charles John Napier, returning to King in 1811. She served on the Jamaica and North Sea stations in 1812 and 1813. On 13 June 1812, Jason detained the American ship Lydia. (Note: A first-class share of the value of the cargo and vessel was worth £435 2s 2d; a sixth-class share was worth £3 10s 11d.) Almost a month later, on 12 July, Jason detained the American brig Cyrus. (Note: A first-class share was worth £262 10s; a sixth-class share, that of an ordinary seaman, was worth £2 2d.)

Two days later Jason captured the American ship Three Friends. (Note: A first-class share was worth £87 3s 10d; a sixth-class share, that of an ordinary seaman, was worth £1 8d.)

In 1814 Jason formed part of the escort for King Louis XVIII and later for the Russian and Prussian Emperors during the negotiations to end the Napoleonic Wars.

== Fate ==
In 1815 at the end of the war, Jason was broken up at Plymouth.

== Notes and citations ==
Notes

Citations
