= HMS Grenada (1804) =

Brig of the Royal Navy

Grenada
History

France
- Name: Harmonie
- Launched: 1800
- Captured: November 1803

United Kingdom
- Name: HMS Grenada
- Acquired: 1804 by gift
- Honours and awards: Naval General Service Medal with clasp "Guadaloupe"
- Fate: Sold for breaking up December 1810

General characteristics
- Tons burthen: 141 (bm)
- Length: 71 ft 6 in (21.8 m) (overall)
- Beam: 21 ft 11 in (6.7 m)
- Depth of hold: 8 ft 2 in (2.5 m)
- Complement: French service: 66 at capture; British service: NA
- Armament: Privateer: 8 guns (at capture); British service: 12 × 12-pounder carronades + 2 × 4-pounder chase guns

HMS Grenada was the French schooner Harmonie, launched in 1800 and armed at Cayenne in 1803 as a privateer. Boats of a squadron of the British Royal Navy cut her out from the harbour of Le Marin, Martinique, on 16 November 1803. The citizens of Grenada purchased her and donated her to the Royal Navy, which commissioned her in 1804 as HMS Grenada. She was later converted to a brig. She captured nine small French privateers before being sold for breaking up in 1810.

== Capture ==
Around November, HMS Saint Lucia recaptured the brig Earl St. Vincent, which had been sailing from Dublin to Barbados, and a Swedish schooner. The French privateer Harmonie, of Martinique, had captured the brig and the schooner three days earlier. Saint Lucia was unable to capture the privateer, which escaped by throwing her guns overboard and sawing down her gunwales.

On 14 November Harmonie entered the harbour at Le Marin, together with a prize that she had taken. Captain Thomas Graves, in the 74-gun Third Rate Blenheim, determined to cut her out. He beat around Diamond Rock but was not able to get into position until the 16th. He then decided to put 60 seamen in four boats, and 60 marines into another four. The seamen were to go into the harbour to cut out Harmonie, while the marines were to attack a battery of nine guns at Fort Dunkirk on the starboard side of the bay to block French reinforcements from massing there. Drake arrived on the scene and Graves had Captain William Ferris lead the seamen in the attack, together with 16 men from her. Drake towed the cutting out party, whilst the hired armed cutter Swift towed the marines. The two parties set out at 11p.m., and at 3a.m. the two attacks succeeded. The marines captured the fort, which was only guarded by 15 men, whom they took prisoner. They spiked six 24-pounder guns and three 18-pounders, and blew up the magazine. The cutting out party met with resistance from Harmonie and suffered the only British casualties. Hermione, of eight guns, had had a crew of 66 men under the command of Citizen Noyer at the start of the British attack. Some 12 escaped overboard and some may have drowned. Two were killed and 14 wounded. Blenheim had one man killed and two wounded, and Drake had three wounded, one dangerously so.

Lloyd's Patriotic Fund awarded Ferris an honour sword worth £100. It also awarded four swords of £50 to two Royal Marine lieutenants and two naval lieutenants. One of the marines had died before the award and his family requested the value of the sword instead.

== HMS Grenada ==
The inhabitants of Grenada purchased Harmonie and donated her to the Royal Navy on 27 January 1804. Lieutenant John Barker was appointed to command HMS Grenada on 23 April for the Leeward Islands station.

The Navy converted Grenada to a brig and registered her on 13 October.

Still, on 29 December 1804, Kingfisher captured the French privateer schooner Deux Amis. She was pierced for eight guns but only had two on board at the time of her capture, having thrown the others overboard as she tried to escape her pursuers. She had a crew of 39 men, under the command of Francis Dutrique. She was ten days out of Guadeloupe and had captured nothing. Captain R.W. Cribb of King's Fisher credited His Majesty's schooner Grenada with having chased Deux Amis into his hands. Furthermore, when Grenada's commander saw that King's Fisher would capture Deux Amis, he chased and recaptured the sloop Hero, which was sailing in ballast.

On 22 February 1805, Grenada captured Pegamy.

On 16 March, Grenada was some six miles off Union Island when she sighted a suspicious vessel. After a chase of two hours, she caught up with and captured the French privateer schooner Intrepid (or Intrepide). Intrepid was armed with four 6-pounder guns and had a crew of 66 men under the command of Citizen Jean Durand. She had been fitted out at Cayenne and had been at sea for 12 days but without taking any prizes. Intrepid did not resist and there were no casualties.

On 24 July Grenada captured the French privateer schooner Petite Aricere, of four guns and 35 men.

Grenada's only single-ship action – the only real combat of her career – took place on the morning of 15 February 1806. She was some five or six leagues west of Pearl Rock (14°50′N 61°13′W). Martinique, when she sighted and gave chase to a vessel to the south. At 7 a.m. Grenada fired her first shot and an intermittent 4 1/2-hour engagement ensued as wind conditions shifted. The enemy vessel finally struck and proved to be the French letter of marque schooner Princess Murat. She was armed with two 42-pounder guns, one 9-pounder gun, several swivel guns, and small arms. Her guns were so arranged that she could fire them on either beam; this meant that her broadside was about 30% heavier than that of Grenada. Princess Murat had a crew of 52 men and was 12 hours out from Martinique. She was carrying a cargo of dry goods, nuts, and other products. In the engagement she had lost three men killed and seven wounded; Grenada had two men wounded, one a boy who died some hours later, and James Atkins, her master, who was severely wounded. (Note: Atkins received an 18-ounce ball in the shoulder just below the collarbone. He survived and in December 1808 received promotion to lieutenant and appointment to command of Mosambique. Some six years after the engagement he received a gratuity of £136 17s for his wound. A detachment of soldiers from the 60th Regiment of Foot, which was serving aboard Grenada as marines, sustained no casualties.) Both vessels had sustained severe damage to their masts and rigging. The next day Princess Murat's masts fell overboard. Grenada's topmasts were damaged and her sails were in pieces.

On 20 August 1806 Grenada captured the French privateer Espoir. Prize money for Pegamy, Intrepid and Espoir was finally paid in April 1815. (Note: A first-class share of the prize money for Pegamy was worth £25 15s 4¾d; a fifth-class share was worth 10s 2¼d. A first-class for Intrepide was worth £37 15s 3d; a fifth-class share, that of a seaman, was worth 10s 2¼d. Grenada shared the prize money with Cyane. A first-class share for Espoire was worth £14 12s 8d; a fifth-class share was worth 6s 2½d.) Prize money for Princess Murat was paid in February 1827. (Note: A first-class share of the prize money for Princess Murat was worth £73 3s 6d; a fifth-class share was worth 17s 10d.)

In November 1806 Grenada captured three privateers. On 4 November she was five or six leagues off "London Bridge Rock", Tobago (11°21′00″N 60°32′00″W), when she sighted a suspicious vessel. After a chase of four hours Grenada was able to capture the French privateer schooner Desirée, of one gun and 24 men. Desirée was 32 days out of Martinique but had not captured anything. Eight days later, Grenada was five or six miles off Carriacou when she sighted another suspicious vessel. A five-hour chase ensued before Grenada was able to capture the French privateer schooner Marianne. Marianne was armed with one long 9-pounder gun, which she had thrown overboard during the chase. She had a crew of 46 men and was four days out from Martinique, having captured nothing. Still, Barker was pleased to have caught her as on previous cruises the fast-sailing Marianne had done some damage to British trade. On 27 November, Grenada was three leagues west of London Bridge Rock when she sighted yet another suspicious vessel. A four-hour chase later, Grenada captured the French privateer sloop Tigre, of two 6-pounder guns and a crew of 26 men. Tigre was 15 days out from Guadeloupe and had captured a mail boat. On earlier cruises Tigre had considerable damage to the coasting trade of Saint Lucia and St Vincents.

Grenada was laid up at Antigua on 27 January 1808. However, this appears to have been temporary.

In April 1808 Barker left Grenada. (Note: In October he became the Resident-Agent in the West Indies for transports and prisoners-of-war, in which capacity her served until December 1815.) Lieutenant George Guy Burton replaced Barker as temporary commander.

In mid-1808, Grenada recaptured the sloop Trafalgar, Tyne, master, of Trinidad, which the French privateer Rodeur had captured. Grenada sent Trafalgar into Grenada. Then on 25 October, Grenada captured the French privateer Moriche, of one gun and 60 men, off Trinidad.

Then on 6 December 1808 Lieutenant Stephen Briggs commissioned Grenada for the Leeward Islands. He commanded her until she was sold.

Grenada, still under Briggs's command, also participated in the capture of Guadeloupe in January and February 1810. (Note: A first-class share of the prize money for Guadaloupe was worth £113 3s 1¼d; a sixth-class share, that of an ordinary seaman, was worth £1 9s 1¼d.) In 1847 the Admiralty awarded the Naval General Service Medal with clasp "Guadaloupe" to all surviving participants of the campaign.

== Fate ==
Grenada was sold for breaking up on 31 December 1810.
