= HMS Galatea (1794) =

Frigate of the Royal Navy

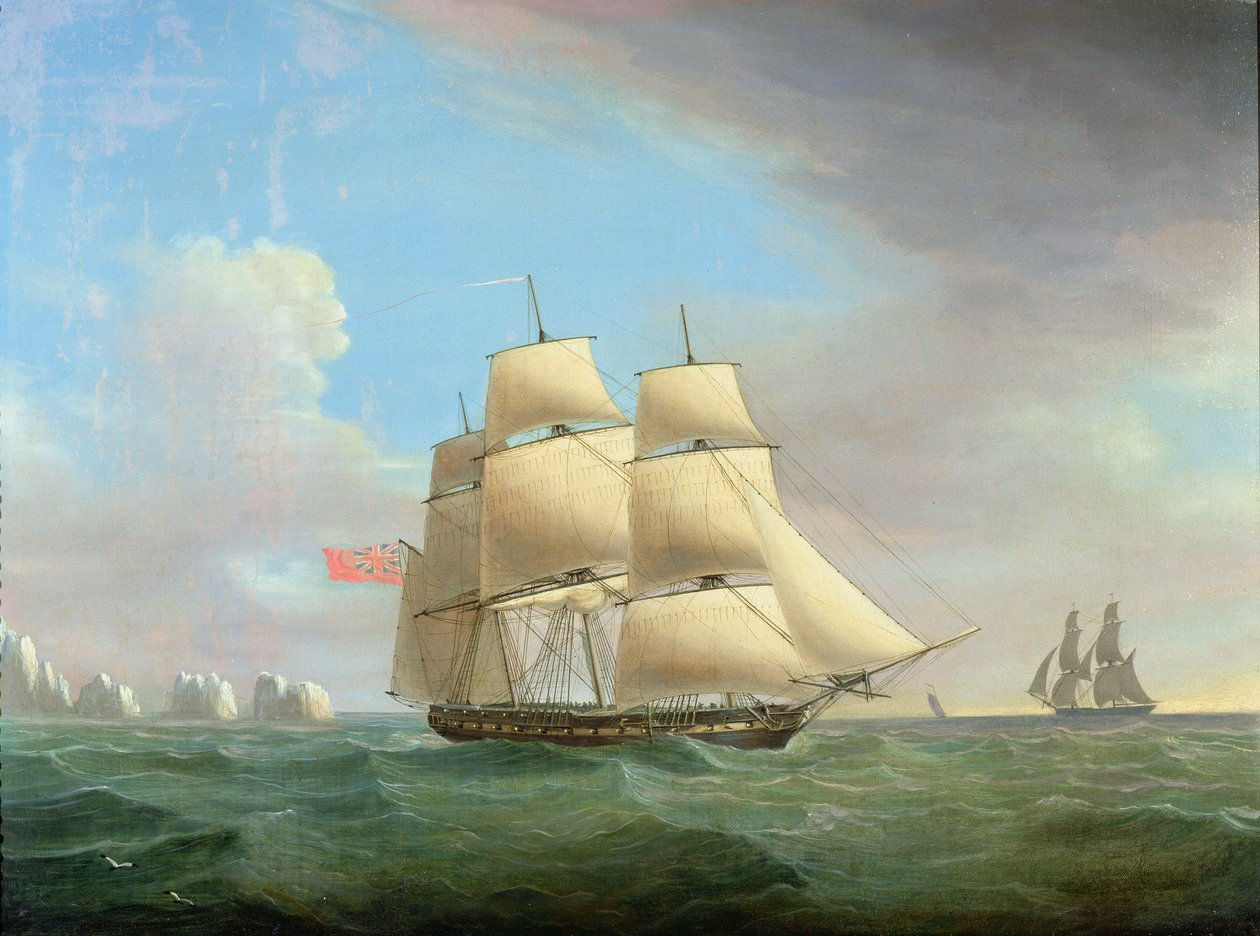
- Painting of Galatea by Thomas Whitcombe

History

Great Britain
- Name: HMS Galatea
- Builder: George Parsons, Bursledon
- Launched: 1794
- Commissioned: May 1794
- Honours and awards: Naval General Service Medal with clasp "21 Jan. Boat Service 1807"
- Fate: Broken up, May 1809

General characteristics
- Type: Fifth-rate frigate
- Tons burthen: 808 (bm)
- Length: 135 ft (41.1 m)
- Beam: 36 ft 6 in (11.1 m)
- Sail plan: Full-rigged ship
- Armament: 32 × 18-pounder guns

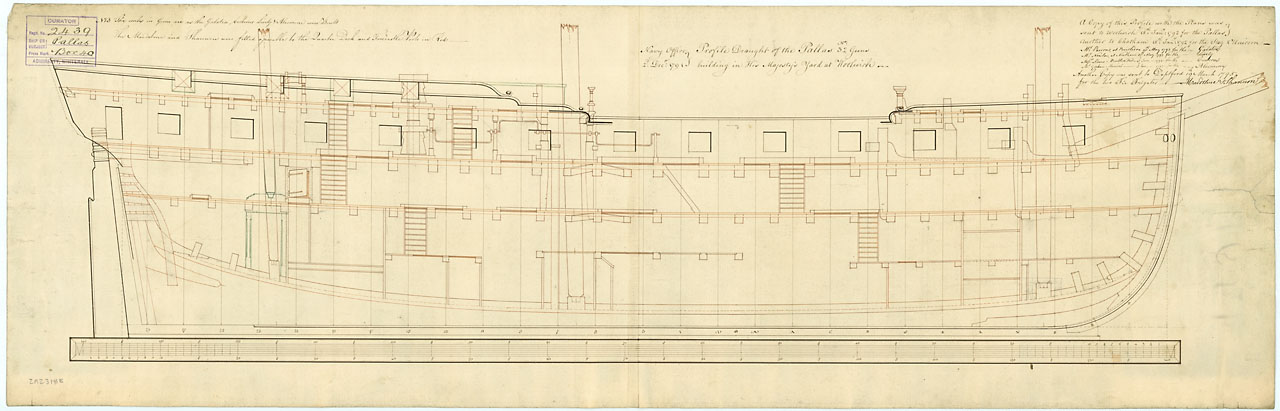
Galatea drawn in 1794

HMS Galatea was a 32-gun fifth-rate frigate of the Royal Navy designed by George Parsons at Bursledon and launched in 1794. Before she was broken up in 1809 she captured numerous prizes and participated in a number of actions, first in the Channel and off Ireland (1794–1803), and then in the Caribbean (1802–1809), including one that earned her crew the Naval General Service Medal.

== Service history ==
=== Channel Fleet, 1794–1803 ===
Galatea was commissioned in May 1794 under the command of Captain Richard Goodwin Keats. She then joined the Channel Squadrons under Sir Edward Pellew and Sir John Borlase Warren.

Galatea took part in the capture or destruction of a number of French warships. On 23 August, the squadron ran the French ships Volontaire, Espion, and Alerte on to the shore along the coast of France and destroyed them.

Galatea, Arethusa, Artois, Diamond and Diana shared in the capture of the French cutter Quartidi on 7 September. They also shared in the recapture of the Swedish brig Haesingeland on 16 September.

Galatea was among the vessels in sight when Artois captured the frigate Révolutionnaire of 40 guns and 370 men at the action of 21 October 1794. She was on her first cruise, barely a week out of LeHavre. Prize money exceeded £16,000. The Royal Navy took her into service as HMS Revolutionaire.

From January into February Galatea was under the temporary command of Captain F. Cole. On 31 January 1795, the squadron captured the Dutch East India Ship Ostenhuyson.

Between 13 and 26 February 1795, the squadron under Captain Sir John Borlase Warren in Pomone, captured nine vessels off the Île de Groix, near Lorient:

- Sloop Petit Jean;
- Brig St. Pierre;
- Brig Deux Frères;
- Ship Petite Magalène;
- Pacquet boat De Cayenne;
- Schooner Curieuse (name latter corrected to Coureuse; she was a vessel belonging to the National Convention government), of eight brass guns;
- Lugger Liberté;
- Lugger Gloire; and
- Brig transport Biche (National Convention).

The squadron also burnt seven vessels and scuttled four. In his letter listing the vessels, Warren particularly thanked Keats for his efforts.

Coureuse, American-built, was escorting this convoy from Brest to Nantes with clothing for the army. The frigates Artois, Galatea and Anson, and the hired armed lugger Duke of York assisted Pomone in the capture. The British latter scuttled two more of the brigs that were of little value, but took the other four vessels as prizes, with HMS Coureuse being taken into service briefly as a dispatch vessel in the Mediterranean. (Note: Chapelle reports that Coureuse's eight guns were only 2-pounders.)

Galatea, Anson, Artois and Pomone shared in the capture of Jean Amie, François Bernard and Lune on 15 and 27 February 1795. Between 13 February and 2 March, the same four British ships shared in the capture of the Petit Jean, Adélaïde, and Aimalie.

Then Galatea took the ship-corvette Expédition on 16 April 1795. Expédition, of 16 guns and 110 men, was formerly a British packet. She was part of a convoy that Pellew's squadron had chased and was one of several small vessels they captured that day.

Galatea participated in the unsuccessful invasion of France at Quiberon Bay between 23 June and 21 July. She therefore was among the myriad vessels that shared in the proceeds of the capture of the Harmony and Rachel on 1 and 4 July 1795. Galatea was also among the vessels of Pellew's squadron that shared in the recapture, on 9 October, of the ship Kent.

Galatea, Artois, Anson and Pomone, which was under the command of Sir John Borlase Warren, who commanded the squadron, attacked a French convoy of some 60 vessels, including its escort of four frigates, a corvette, the armed store ship Étoile and a gun-brig, on 20 March 1796. The British captured Étoile, which was under the command of lieutenant de vaisseau Mathurin-Théodore Berthelin. She was armed with thirty 12-pounder guns and had a crew of 160 men. The British also captured a ship and four brigs belonging to the convoy. In the engagement Galatea lost two men killed and six wounded and her losses represented the only British casualties. In his letter, Sir John exaggerated the French strength; actually the British outgunned them.

On 29 March Galatea recaptured the ship Fortitude. Then Galatea, Pomone, Artois and Anson shared in the capture of several vessels.

- América (6 April);
- Jean Marie (18 April);
- French ship Robuste (26 April):
- Pacific (14 May);
- Lodoiska (22 May);
- Friendschap (25 May).
- Fantaisie (25 May);

Then Galatea, Pomone, Artois and Anson shared in the capture of the chasse marees Charlotte and Véronique on 16 August. Six days later, the same four vessels plus the lugger Argus captured the Jonge Duisse.

On 23 August 1796 the squadron was cruising near the Garonne when a French frigate hove in sight. Notwithstanding the difficulty of the navigation in shoal waters Captain Richard Goodwin Keats and Galatea pursued the frigate. The French pilot on board declared himself incapable of piloting the ship in the shoal waters, but Keats persevered taking responsibility for conning his ship and chased the enemy through the night in squally winds, rain and lightning, passing between the Chevrier bank and the lighthouse before making all sail in pursuit right over the shoals of Arcachon on which the French frigate struck and was immediately wrecked. In the morning they were joined by the ' 'Artois' ' and Sylph. Boats from Artois and Galatea were sent with a boarding party. The frigate turned out to be the Andromaque, of forty-four 12-pounder guns (though pierced for 48), most of which her crew thrown overboard. She had a crew of 300 men, many of whom jumped overboard and who drowned in their attempt to reach the shore. The boarding party took prisoner Andromaque's captain and officers, and rescued a number of Portuguese prisoners who had been the crews of two Brazilian ships that her squadron had captured. A boarding party from Sylph fired into her bottom to prevent re-floating and set fire to Andromaque as they left; she was completely burnt.

Shortly after this encounter the squadron returned to Falmouth on Admiralty orders to reinforce the squadrons off Brest. such was the widespread public expectation that the gallant western frigate squadron would continue its well publicised harassment of the enemy the admiralty wrote they were 'intending by and by to release you from the fleet and send you cruising again on your old ground." Next, Galatea, Pomone, Artois and Anson shared in the capture of even more vessels:

- Brig (name unknown), chasse marees Maria Theresa and Providence (11 December);
- Spanish brig recaptured (14 December); and
- Spanish brig Divina Pastora (17 December);

Also in 1796, Galatea, as a member of the fleet under Admiral Colpoys, shared in the capture of the privateer Franklin. On 19 November, Galatea was among the vessels that shared in the capture of the Bergen.

Pomone, Galatea, Anson and Artois recaptured the whaler Mary South on 25 April 1797. On 15 May, Pomone, Galatea and Artois detained the Count Bernstoff.

A month and a half later, on 30 June 1797, Captain George Byng had assumed command of Galatea and was her captain when she captured the privateer lugger Argonaute off Cape Clear. Argonaute was armed with two brass 6-pounder guns and ten swivel guns. She had a crew of 36 men and was 14 days out of Granville but had not taken any prizes.

On 15 July, Doris took the 22-gun privateer Duguay-Trouin. Galatea shared in the capture.

On 19 July, Doris and Galatea recaptured the Portuguese ship Nostra Senora de Patrocinio e Santa Anna. At some point they also recaptured the Portuguese ship Nostra Senora de Conceiçao e Navigantes.

A little over a month later, on 22 August 1797 Galatea recaptured the brig Friends Adventure. Then on 6 November she captured the 14-gun Venturier, the former Ranger. There being a Ranger already in service, when the Royal Navy took Galatea's prize into back into service they gave her the name HMS Venturer.

In 1799, Galatea was stationed off Southern Ireland. On 26 December she was in company with Loire when they captured the American ship Favorite.

In January 1800 Galatea escorted a convoy from Cork through the Channel to the Downs. On a stormy night, Lieutenant Donald Campbell and six men took a boat to take possession of a Spanish letter of marque that Galatea had caught. Because of the weather it took them an hour to get to her and then as they boarded her waves stove in their boat. Still, the seven men took control of Pensée and her 20-man crew. However, for the next ten days the weather blocked Campbell from contact with Galatea. Campbell therefore had to navigate Pensée while keeping control of a group of prisoners that outnumbered his men by almost three to one. This feat and his good service record led to Lieutenant Campbell being promoted to first lieutenant of Carysfort in 1802 or 1803.

On 3 January 1801, Galatea escorted Hibernia into Plymouth from Belfast. Hibernia was a linen ship worth £100,000, and was carrying as a passenger Mr. J. Dalway, Member of Parliament from Belfast. On their way the two vessels encountered very bad weather off the Isles of Scilly.

On 21 April 1801 Galatea recaptured Kenyon. Kenyon had been en route from Jamaica to Liverpool with a cargo worth £40,000, when the French captured her. Braave recaptured Kenyon and the three other prizes, which the French again captured. After re-recapturing Kenyon, Galatea searched for the other three; there is no report of her having recaptured them, so she was apparently unable to find them.

After this, Captain George Wolfe assumed command, having been appointed in April 1801. On 1 July Galatea came into Plymouth after a cruise of 18 weeks in the Atlantic and off the western islands. Then during October and November she was on a 28-day cruise in the Bay of Biscay. Here she not only endured fifteen severe gales, but on 1 and 2 November she nearly foundered. Hurricane-force winds sent her mizzen mast and the main and foretop masts over the side, even though she had no sails set. Furthermore, when the mizzen mast went it took one seaman to go overboard with it and severely injured others. When the winds died down on 3 November, Byng sailed Galatea for Cork. There he jury rigged a mizzen-mast, main, and foretop-mast. Galatea finally reached Plymouth on 22 November.

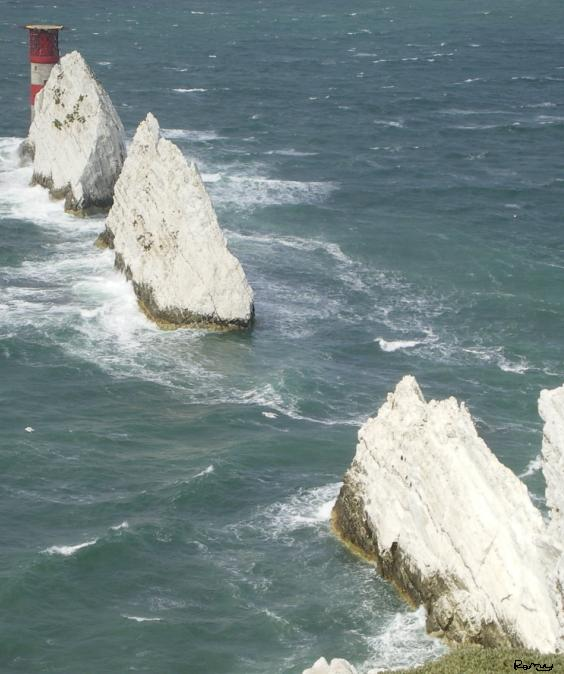
The Needles from the cliffs inshore at The Needles Batteries

She spent the first quarter of 1802 sailing between Cork and Plymouth and was paid off on 28 April 1802. On 30 July she sailed in company with Amethyst and Glenmore for the Isle of Wight. There they were to pick up Dutch troops to return to Holland.

Galatea and several other frigates then returned to Plymouth from Den Helder on 3 September. On 14 September she sailed for Spithead carrying discharged seamen. She then returned discharged marines to Plymouth. Subsequently, she cruised on patrols looking for smugglers.

In April 1803 Captain Henry Heathcote assumed command while Galatea was being fitted out at Portsmouth. On 8 July she sailed to take up position as guardship off The Needles.

=== Caribbean, 1804–1809 ===
In February 1804 Galatea sailed to the West Indies as escort to a convoy of merchant vessels. On 19 May she recaptured Boyd, which was carrying plantation stores. A month later, on 25 June, she recaptured the English ship Beaver, which was carrying a cargo of slaves and ivory.

On 3 August the French privateer schooner Elizabeth, of six guns, arrived at Dominica. Galatea had cut her out at Guadeloupe.

The next attempt to cut out a French vessel went badly. On 14 August Galatea attempted to cut out the French privateer Général Ernouf, which had been the British sloop-of-war Lilly. Général Ernouf was sheltering at the Saintes near Guadeloupe where shore batteries could protect her. The attack was a debacle for the British, who failed completely in their attempt. Captain Heathcote had been too obvious in his reconnoitering and the French were waiting for the night attack. In all, the British lost some 10 men killed, including Lieutenant Charles Hayman, the commander of the boarding party, and first lieutenant of Galatea, and 55 or more wounded or captured. The French lost four killed and suffered some wounded, among them Captain Lapointe, commander of Général Ernouf, and Lieutenant Mouret, commander of the detachment of troops the French stationed aboard her in anticipation of the attack. The French also captured Galatea's barge, which the other three boats of the cutting out party could not retrieve as they made their escape.

On 18 September Galatea captured Mercury.

In July 1805 Galatea came under the command of Captain Murray Maxwell at Jamaica. By September Galatea was under the command of Captain George Sayer. On 11 September she shared with Circe, Africaine, Hippomenes, Amelia, and the schooner Maria in the proceeds of the capture of the brig Hiram .

In February 1806 Galatea recaptured the merchantman Shipley, which a French privateer had captured as Shipley was sailing to Dominica. Galatea sent Shipley into Barbados. The French privateer was the former Royal Navy schooner Demerara.

On 18 August 1806 Lieutenant M'Culloch used Galatea's barge to pursue a schooner several miles up a river near Puerto Cabello, Venezuela. The schooner resisted the boarding party until she lost her commander and a crew member, at which time she surrendered. She proved to be a Spanish privateer with three long 6 and 4-pounder guns, some swivel guns, and musketoons. M'Culloch blew her up as he could not safely bring her out. He did return with the prisoners. Galatea suffered one man wounded in the affair.

Three days later Galatea's boats under Lieutenant Walker captured a small Spanish privateer armed with swivel guns and small arms. Her crew, however, escaped; Walker had her destroyed.

Then between 9 and 11 October a cutting-out party in three boats under the command of Richard Gittins, the first lieutenant, brought out four Spanish schooners that were sheltering under three batteries at Barcelona (Colombia). Although the cutting-out party was under fire from the batteries for one and a half hours, it suffered no casualties.

Off Guadeloupe on the morning of 12 November 1806 Galatea sailed after a strange sail. After a pursuit of a few hours Galatea was able, once the seas were calm enough, to dispatch a boarding party. The schooner's crew resisted slightly, but she struck just before the boarding party came on board. The schooner was the Réunion, bound for Martinique from La Guaira with cargo and dispatches from the Spanish government at Caracas to the French commander at Martinique. Réunion was pierced for 14 guns but was armed with ten.

==== Galatea captures Lynx ====
On 3 January 1807 Galatea captured a schooner.

On the morning of 21 January 1807 Galatea was off the coast of Venezuela when she sighted a sail steering for La Guaira. Galatea approached and identified the vessel as a man-of-war; she then change her course, heading for Barcelona, Anzoátegui, which lay some 160 miles to the east. By noon Galatea was becalmed; at the same time a slight breeze enabled Galatea's quarry to continue on her way. Two hours later lookouts could barely see her highest sails above the horizon.

Galatea sent her boats under the command of her first lieutenant William Coombe, together with Lieutenants Harry Walker and Robert Gibson, Master's Mates John Green and Barry Sarsfield, 50 seamen and 20 marines. The boat crews rowed about 35 miles in eight hours, some of it in the blazing sun, before they were able to catch up with their quarry. The British tried to board twice, but her guns repelled them. The boats then pulled back and poured musket and small arms fire through the stern and quarter ports. This had the effect of clearing many of the enemy from her decks, including the captain and most of his officers. The British then were able to board on their third attempt. There they still faced a fight as the vessel's crew outnumbered the attackers.

Still, Coombe and his men prevailed and discovered that they had captured the French navy corvette Lynx. She was armed with fourteen 24-pounder carronades, two 9-pounder chase guns and carried a crew of 161 men under the command of Mons. Jean M. Yarquest. Their resistance had cost the French 14 men killed and 20 wounded, including their captain. The British loss was 9 killed, including Lieutenant Walker. Coombe and Master's Mates Sarsfield and Green were among the 22 wounded. Coombe's wound was in the thigh above his previous amputation.

The surviving British officers received promotions. Coombe was promoted to commander but received an appointment as captain of Hart, not Lynx. Hart was a lesser vessel than Lynx and Coombe complained to the admiral of the station and then to the Admiralty. The Admiralty reversed the appointments, which led to Coombe fighting a duel with the relegated captain. The Royal Navy took Lynx into service as Heureux.

The Patriotic Society awarded Coombe and several of the other British officers swords worth 50 guineas, but Coombe did not live to receive it. In 1849 the Navy awarded the Naval General Service Medal with clasp "21 Jan. Boat Service 1807" to all surviving claimants from the action.

Some two months after the capture of Lynx, on 3 March, Galatea captured an open boat. Then in October Galatea captured several Danish ships:

- 12 October: with the brig Hart, under the command of Commander William Coombe, she captured the schooner John and Joseph;
- 13 October: with the brig Pert she captured the brig Catharini;
- 17 October: again with Pert, she captured the brig Amalia;
- 18 October: with Cygnet she captured the Danish ship Johann Smidt Senior, Hans Jansen Hammer, master. (Note: For Galatea, a seaman's share of the prize money was £5 17s 1½d. A seaman's share of the prize money for Catharini was 8s 8d; for Amalia it was 8s 8½d, and for John and Joseph it was 2s 10½d.)

Galatea shared with Hart, Pert, Circe, Cygnet and others in the proceeds of the Danish schooner Danske Patriot, captured on 20 October. (Note: Because of the number of vessels sharing, a seaman's share of the prize money was only 1s 2½d, or about one day's wages.)

In December Galatea was part of the squadron under Admiral Sir Alexander Cochrane that captured the Danish islands of St Thomas on 22 December and Santa Cruz on 25 December. The Danes did not resist and the invasion was bloodless.

== Fate ==
Galatea returned to England in the spring of 1809 where she was paid off. She was in poor condition and so was broken up at Woolwich in April. In November, Captain Sayer moved to command Leda.
