= HMS Demerara (1804) =

History

United Kingdom
- Name: Anna
- Fate: Sold 1804

United Kingdom
- Name: HMS Demerara
- Acquired: 1804 by purchase
- Fate: Captured July 1804

France
- Name: Hebe
- Acquired: 1804 by capture

United Kingdom
- Name: Anna
- Acquired: 1806 by capture
- Fate: Broken up 1809

General characteristics
- Tons burthen: 106 (bm)
- Length: 72 ft 8 in (22.1 m)
- Beam: 18 ft 8 in (5.7 m)
- Depth of hold: 5 ft 7 in (1.7 m)
- Sail plan: Schooner
- Complement: 55
- Armament: Demerara:10 × 4-pounder guns; Hebe:14 guns

HMS Demerara was the mercantile schooner Anna that the British Royal Navy purchased in 1804. A French privateer captured her that same year and Demerara became the French privateer Hebe. She had an unsuccessful single-ship action in 1806. The Royal Navy recaptured her and she returned to service that year as HMS Anna. She was broken up in 1809.

== HMS ==
The Navy appointed Lieutenant Thomas Dutton to command Demerara.

On 14 July 1804 Demerara was cruising off Demerara when at daylight she sighted a ship at anchor. The ship got under weigh and approached Demerara, which attempted to escape what was clearly a well-armed privateer. Within an hour the privateer had caught up with her quarry and started firing small arms and a broadside. Within 10 minutes Demerara had lost one man killed and nine wounded, and Dutton struck. The privateer was Grande Décidée. She was armed with 22 guns and had a crew of 155 men.

== Privateer ==
Lloyd's List of 18 April 1806 reported that a 14-gun privateer had captured Shipley, but that Shipley had been recaptured and had arrived at Barbados. In February Shipley had encountered a French three-masted schooner privateer, the former HMS Demerara. Wilson and Shipley resisted for an hour and three-quarters until after he was severely wounded, as were the mate and the steward, and she had had four men killed. (The French had lost six men killed, including her second captain, and many men wounded.) The French plundered Shipley of her cargo. It was HMS Galatea that recaptured Shipley. On 25 July Shipley Williams & Co., Shipley's owners, presented Wilson with a silver cup as a token of appreciation. The cup's inscription names the French privateer as Hebe.

== HMS ==
It appears that the Royal Navy may have retaken Demerara. The vessel resumed the name Anna on 15 August 1806, i.e., after the above engagement, and after the commissioning of a new Demerara. Anna was broken up in 1809.
