= Nimble (ship) =

Several vessels have been named Nimble:

- Nimble (1786 ship) was built in Folkestone in 1781, possibly under another name. In 1786 Nimble was almost rebuilt and lengthened. Between 1786 and 1798 she made nine voyages as a whaler in the British Southern Whale Fishery. Between 1799 and 1804 she made four voyages from Liverpool as a slave ship. She was sold in 1804 at St Thomas after she had delivered her slaves.
- Nimble (1802 ship) was built in Kingston upon Hull. She traded with Portugal, first from Hull and then from Liverpool. She was lengthened in 1806. Later, she traded between London and Brazil, and then London and the West Indies. An American privateer captured her in 1814. She was recaptured and then disappeared from ship arrival and departure (SAD) data.
- Nimble (1813 ship) was built at Plymouth. Initially she engaged in a triangular trade between Africa, Brazil, and Britain. She then sailed between Britain and the eastern Mediterranean. She was twice plundered by pirates, once while on her way to Brazil and the some years later as she was on her way to Smyrna. In 1824 her owners had her lengthened. In 1828–1830 Nimble sailed to Mauritius under a licence from the British East India Company (EIC). She was last listed in 1833.

== See also ==
- HMS Nimble – any one of eight vessels of the British Royal Navy
- USS Nimble – either of two vessels of the United states Navy
