= Nimble (1813 ship) =

1813 English ship

History

United Kingdom
- Name: Nimble
- Builder: Plymouth
- Launched: 1813
- Fate: Last listed 1833

General characteristics
- Tons burthen: Originally: 144 (bm); After lengthening: 189 (bm)
- Sail plan: Schooner

Nimble was built at Plymouth in 1813. Initially she engaged in a triangular trade between Africa, Brazil, and Britain. She then sailed between Britain and the eastern Mediterranean. She was twice plundered by pirates, once while on her way to Brazil and the some years later as she was on her way to Smyrna. In 1824 her owners had her lengthened. In 1828–1830 Nimble sailed to Mauritius under a licence from the British East India Company (EIC). She was last listed in 1833.

== Career ==
Nimble first appeared in Lloyd's Register (LR) in 1816.

Year	Master	Owner	Trade	Source
1816	T.Liang	N.Deey	London–Africa	LR

On 25 June 1816 Nimble, Liang, master, arrived at Portsmouth. She sailed two days later for Africa. On 10 July she was at Madeira. On 8 February 1817 she was at Cape Coast Castle, having come from Bahia. On 28 June 1817 she arrived back at Portsmouth from Sierra Leone; On the 30th she was at Gravesend, reportedly from Senegal. On 21 August she sailed from Gravesend, bound for Cape Coast Castle. A week later she was at Falmouth, on her way to Africa.

On 5 February 1818 Nimble arrived at Bahia. On her way from Cape Coast a pirate or privateer had plundered her of cargo worth $2000.

Year	Master	Owner	Trade	Source
1819	T.Liang; R.Watson	N.Deey; Long	Plymouth–Buenos Aires	LR
1821	R.Watson; W.Wishart	Blythe & Co.	Cork–Turkey	LR

On 18 November 1822, as Nimble, Wishart, master, was returning to London from Smyrna, she ran foul of Nesbit, Grey, master, which was on her way to Jamaica from London. Both vessels put into Ramsgate. Nesbit had lost her anchor, bowsprit, and cables; Nimble had lost her anchor and cable, and sustained other damage.

Year	Master	Owner	Trade	Source & notes
1824	Wishart; Elsdon; G.Gibson	Blythe & Co/	London; Smyrna	LR; lengthened, raised, and rebuilt in 1824

In 1824 her owners had Nimble lengthened, which increased her burthen by over 30%.

Year	Master	Owner	Trade	Source & notes
1825	G.Gibson	Blythe & Co.	London–Smyrna	LR; lengthened, raised, and rebuilt in 1824
1826	Elsdon; Puddicombe	Blythe & Co.	London–Smyrna	LR; lengthened, raised, and rebuilt in 1824

In 1827 as Nimble was sailing to Smyrna from London pirates plundered her of part of her cargo, stores, and men's clothes. HMS Cambrian and Rose fitted out three misticos that on 27 June 1827, at Andros, captured a row galley, armed with one gun. The galley's 30, or 35 crew members escaped ashore. On the galley the British found Nimble's log book, some oars from the British vessel Brothers, and several other English goods. Cambrian and Rose received head money for the action. (Note: A first-class share was worth £14; a sixth-class share was worth 1s 8½d. A second distribution followed but was subject to deductions. A first-class share was worth £28, minus a deduction of £11 15s 6d; a sixth-class share was worth 1s 8½d, minus a deduction of 7¼d.)

Year	Master	Owner	Trade	Source & notes
1828	Puddicombe; Broad	Blythe & Co.	London–Smyrna	LR; lengthened, raised, and rebuilt in 1824; small repairs 1828

In 1813 the EIC had lost its monopoly on the trade between India and Britain. British ships were then free to sail to India or the Indian Ocean under a license from the EIC.

Year	Master	Owner	Trade	Source & notes
1829	Broad	Driver & Co.	London–Île de France	LR; lengthened, raised, and rebuilt in 1824; small repairs 1828

In 1829 or so new owners sailed Nimble to Île de France (Mauritius).

Year	Master	Owner	Trade	Source & notes
1829	W.Broad	Driver & Co.	London–Île de France	LR; lengthened, raised, and rebuilt in 1824; small repairs 1828
1833	W.Broad; Parsons	Duver & Co. Illegible	London–India; Illegible	Register of Shipping; lengthened, raised, and rebuilt in 1824; new bottom 1828

== Fate ==
Nimble was no longer listed in LR after 1833. The last clear mention of her was a report in July that Nimble, Parsons, master, had returned from Marseilles.
