= HM gunboat Hannah (1803) =

19th century small gun vessel

History

United Kingdom
- Name: HMS Hannah
- Acquired: 21 December 1803
- Captured: October 1806

General characteristics
- Tons burthen: 59 (bm)
- Propulsion: Sails
- Complement: 28
- Armament: 1 × 24-pounder gun + 1 × 32-pounder carronade

HM gunboat Hannah was a small gun vessel that the Royal Navy hired in 1803. Originally she served on the Irish Station. However, she was in the Mediterranean serving as a tender to HMS Queen when a Spanish privateer captured her in 1806 in a single-ship action.

== Capture ==
On 25 October 1806 Lieutenant John Foote and Hannah were covering the passage of a convoy through the Straits of Gibraltar. Hannah's crew consisted of 27 men from Queen and Royal George.

They were off Cabrita point when Foote sighted a Spanish mistico towing an English merchantman that she had captured. Foote sailed towards the two, intending to attempt to recover the captured vessel. As Hannah approached the mistico cast off the tow and altered course towards Hannah. Foote, realizing that the mistico was larger than Hannah, attempted to escape, but the mistico soon overtook her and opened fire. Foote realized that the only hope was to carry the mistico by boarding. He ran Hannah alongside the mistico. However, a large number of Spaniards leapt aboard Hannah. Some ten or so minutes of hand-to-hand combat ensued before Foote decided to strike. He stated that he struck to spare his men's lives when he "saw scarce an Englishman standing, and another Privateer coming up close".

The British had suffered seven men killed (two of whom had drowned), and 12 wounded (including Foote), one of whom died later. The Spanish had three men seriously wounded.

The mistico was the privateer Gibraltar (aka Generalissimo), under the command of Captain Damián Gabarrón. She was armed with four guns and had a crew of 70 men.
