= Tamer (1801 ship) =

British slave ship 1801–1803

History

United Kingdom
- Name: Tamer
- Acquired: 1801 by purchase of a prize
- Fate: Foundered circa November 1803

General characteristics
- Tons burthen: 392 (bm)
- Complement: 40
- Armament: 14 × 6 + 2 × 12-pounder guns + 4 × 18-pounder carronades

Tamer (or Tamar), was a French prize. She made two complete voyages as a slave ship from 1801 in the triangular trade in enslaved people. She foundered in 1803 off Barbados as she was delivering her captives on her third slave voyage. Before leaving the coast of Angola on this last voyage, she had captured a French slave ship in a sanguinary single ship action. Tamer sailed with her prize, which rescued Tamer's crew and slaves when Tamer foundered. The insurers refused to pay on Tamer's loss, on the grounds that she had deviated from sailing in the most expeditious manner by periodically waiting for her prize to catch up. The court supported the insurers on appeal.

== Career ==
Liverpool owners purchased Tamer in London and had her sail to Liverpool. Tamar first appeared in Lloyd's Register (LR) in 1801.

Year	Master	Owner	Trade	Source
1801	W.Brown	Lawrence	Liverpool–Africa	LR

1st enslaving voyage (1801–1802): Captain William Brown acquired a letter of marque on 20 June 1801. He sailed from Liverpool on 19 July 1801 and arrived in the Bahamas in December, having stopped at St Vincent. At the Bahamas she was sold.

Tamer sailed for Liverpool on 31 January 1802 and arrived there on 28 February. She had left Liverpool with 47 crew members and suffered one crew death on the voyage. Her backhaul cargo consisted of cotton, coffee, tortoise shell, hides, sugar, indigo, specie, and one elephant tooth (ivory tusk).

Year	Master	Owner	Trade	Source
1802	W.Brown; Vc. May	Lawrence	Liverpool–Africa	LR

2nd enslaving voyage (1802–1803): Captain Vincent May sailed from Liverpool on 5 August 1802. Tamer arrived at St Croix on 14 December with 375 slaves. She sailed for Liverpool on 16 February 1803 and arrived back home on 20 March. She had left with 40 crew members and had suffered no crew deaths on her voyage.

At the time Saint Croix was a Danish colony. In 1792, the Danish government passed a law that would outlaw Danish participation in the trans-Atlantic enslaving trade, from early 1803 on. This led the government in the Danish West Indies to encourage the importation of captives prior to the ban taking effect. One measure that it took was to open the trade to foreign vessels. Records for the period 1796 to 1799 show that 24 British enslaving ships, most of them from Liverpool, arrived at St Croix and imported 6,781 captives.

3rd enslaving voyage (1803): Captain May sailed from Liverpool on 30 June 1803 with 61 crew members. She arrived at Cabinda, near the mouth of the Congo River, on 14 August. She saw a French vessel some six miles away, together with a brig and a ship's tender. The next day, May sailed Tamer towards the French vessel which got under weigh. After a chase over 30 miles, Tamer caught up with her quarry. A two-hour engagement ensued before the French vessel struck. In this engagement Tamer had five men killed and seven wounded; the French vessel had eight men killed and 14 wounded.

The French vessel was Braave (or Brave), of 386 tons (bm), which had been built at Bordeaux. She was under the command of Jean-David Sers, and had sailed from France on 18 June 1802. (Note: Brave had sailed to Isle de France (Mauritius), and was on her way back to France with captives and 300,000 francs i Indian goods.) Tamer stayed on the Angolan coast, gathering captives. On 15 October she sailed from Angola, together with Braave, on which May had put a prize crew.

== Fate ==
Tamer and Braave arrived at St Lucia and then sailed on. As Tamer was approaching Barbados she started to take on water from a leak. Braave, which was still in company, took on all the crew and captives that Tamer was carrying and delivered them to Barbados. Lloyd's List reported that Braave had come into Barbados having been "taken at St Lucia". Braave arrived on 5 November with the crews and slaves of both vessels. She had embarked 760 (or 733) captives and she arrived at Barbados with 700. (Note: It is not clear whether the number of captives on Braave included those from Tamer, or not.)

Tamer was valued at £6,000 for the vessel, plus captives and goods. Her insurers refused to pay for Tamer's loss on the grounds that she had deviated from her voyage by convoying Braave, periodically shortening her sails, waiting for Braave to catch up. Braave was not at risk of sinking, and nor was Tamer, so the deviation from the most expeditious continuation of the voyage was solely due to Captain May obeying Tamer's owners having instructed him to bring any prize in. The justices found for the insurers on appeal.

In 1803, 11 British enslaving ships were lost. Seven were lost in the middle passage, that is, while sailing between Africa and the West Indies. In 1803, 99 British vessels sailed from British ports on enslaving voyages; this gives a loss rate of 11%.

In 1804 Braave became HMS Barbadoes.
