= HMS Cambrian (1797) =

Frigate of the Royal Navy

- View of the hull of Cambrian

History

Great Britain
- Name: HMS Cambrian
- Ordered: 30 April 1795
- Builder: George Parsons, Bursledon
- Laid down: September 1795
- Launched: 13 February 1797
- Completed: By 16 June 1797
- Honours and awards: Naval General Service Medal with clasp "Navarino"
- Fate: Wrecked on 31 January 1828

General characteristics
- Class & type: 40-gun fifth-rate frigate
- Tons burthen: 1,16114/94 (bm)
- Length: 154 ft (46.9 m) (gundeck); 128 ft 5 1/4 in (39.1 m) (keel)
- Beam: 41 ft 3 in (12.6 m)
- Sail plan: Full-rigged ship
- Complement: 320
- Armament: As built; Gun deck: 28 × 24-pounder guns; QD: 8 × 9-pounder guns + 6 × 32-pounder carronades; Fc: 4 × 9-pounder guns + 2 × 32-pounder carronades; From 1799; 6 × 9-pounder guns replaced by 32-pounder carronades; 24-pounders replaced by lighter version; From 1805; 24-pounder guns replaced by 18-pounder guns; From 1807; Gun deck: 28 × 18-pounder guns; QD: 2 × 9-pounder guns + 12 × 32-pounder carronades; Fc: 2 × 9-pounder guns + 2 × 32-pounder carronades

HMS Cambrian was a Royal Navy 40-gun fifth-rate frigate. She was built and launched at Bursledon in 1797 and served in the English Channel, off North America, and in the Mediterranean. She was briefly flagship of both Admiral Mark Milbanke and Vice-Admiral Sir Andrew Mitchell during her career, and was present at the Battle of Navarino. Cambrian was wrecked off the coast of Grabusa in 1828.

== Design ==
Ordered on 30 April 1795, Cambrian was designed by Sir John Henslow and built by George Parsons of Bursledon. She represented the first attempt to design a frigate that would carry 24-pounder guns and was one of several designs the Admiralty ordered to find a counter to French 24-pounder frigates. For her design, Henslow essentially simply scaled-up an earlier design. However, she was still too small to carry 24-pounder long guns comfortably and so the Admiralty replaced these first with lighter 24-pounders (in April 1799) and then with 18-pounders in 1805.

== French Revolutionary Wars ==
She was first commissioned in April 1797 under Captain Thomas Williams on the Irish station. Then under Captain Arthur Legge she served in the Channel, where she captured a number of French privateers.

On 11 January 1798, in company with Indefatigable and Childers, she captured the French privateer schooner Vengeur. Vengeur was a new vessel of 12 guns and 72 men. She was eight days out of Ostend but had taken no prizes. Pellew sent her into Falmouth.

Five days later, in the evening of 16 January, Sir Edward Pellew's squadron captured the French privateer Inconcevable. She was armed with eight guns and had a crew of 55 men. She was 10 days out of Dunkirk and had taken nothing. Prize money was paid to Indefatigable, Cambrian and Success.

On 28 January, Indefatigable and Cambrian captured the privateer Heureuse Nouvelle. She was armed with 22 guns and had a crew of 130 men. She was 36 days out of Brest and during that time had capture only one ship, a large American vessel named Providence, which had a cargo of cotton and sugar. The hired armed cutter Duke of York also shared in the capture. Pellew sent Cambrian in pursuit of Providence, and that same day Cambrian and Indefatigable recaptured her.

On 27 March 1798, Cambrian captured Cæsar, a French privateer ship of 16 guns and 80 men. She was from Saint-Malo and 35 days out of Brest. Six days earlier, Cambrian and Cleopatra had recaptured William Pen of Philadelphia. Then three days after capturing Cæsar, Cambrian captured Pont de Lodi, which was also French privateer ship, and which carried 16 guns and 102 men. Pont de Lodi was five days out of Bordeaux, on her maiden cruise, and had not yet captured anything.

Near the end of the year, on 8 December, Cambrian captured the French privateer brig Cantabre. Cantabre, which was armed with 14 guns and which carried a crew of 60 men, was, according to Legge, "quite new... on her first Cruize, and a very fine Vessel." Four days later, Cambrian recaptured Dorothea, a Danish brig sailing from Amsterdam to Tangiers with a cargo of bale goods. Three days earlier the French privateer brig Rusée, of Bayonne had captured her in Lat. 42 Deg. 30 Min, North.

Around 20 January 1799, Cambrian encountered a tremendous gale in the Channel, with thunder and lightning. A fireball hit her forecastle, killing two men and wounding seventeen, of whom two were struck blind, and one of whom became "raving mad". All aboard expected immediate destruction.

Some months later, on 9 March, Triton, St Fiorenzo, Naiad, and Cambrian captured the French merchant ship Victoire.

On 9 October 1799, Cambrian was among the several vessels that shared in the capture of the Spanish brig Nostra Senora de la Solidad. Then on 23 October, Cambrian recaptured Sarah. Cambrian also shared in the capture of the Spanish brig San Joachim by Triton.

Ten days later, Cambrian was in company with Stag off the entrance to the Garonne when they spotted two vessels, which they immediately chased. Stag captured one, the letter of marque Heureux Premier, which was armed with 10 brass 6-pounder guns, and which was sailing from Cayenne to Bordeaux with a cargo of red dye, cotton, cocoa, coffee, and sugar. Cambrian sailed after the second vessel, a privateer of 26 guns, but apparently did not succeed in capturing her. Stag did share the prize money for Heureux Premier with Cambrian.

At the end of the month, on 30 October, the American ship Sally came into Plymouth. Cambrian had recaptured her after Sally had been captured by the French privateer Vengeance, of 20 guns and 160 men. Cambrian sailed in pursuit of Vengeance, but did not succeed in capturing her.

On 23 April 1800, Cambrian and Fisgard were in company when they captured the French schooner Emelie. Four days later the two vessels were still in company when Fisgard captured the French privateer Dragon. Then on 5 May Cambrian and Fisgard captured the French brig corvette Dragon, pierced for 14 guns but armed with 10, and with a crew of 72 men under the command of Lieutenant de Vaisseau Lachurie. She was two days out of Rochefort with dispatches for Guadeloupe.

Eleven months later, on 5 April 1801, Cambrian recaptured the letter of marque Nancy, which the French privateer Braave had captured three days earlier. Cambrian shared the prize money with Venerable and Superb. The next day Cambrian captured the French privateer lugger Audacieux. Audacieux was armed with 14 guns and carried a crew of 50 men under the command of S.B. Ant. Candeau. Audacieux had left Bordeaux on 30 March and while at sea had captured one vessel, an American. Cambrian also shared the prize money for Audacieux with Venerable and Superb.

Lastly, on 28 July Cambrian captured the Danish ship Kron Prinz. In November 1804 there was a distribution of a £7000 advance on the prize money for her cargo. As captain, Legge would have been entitled to one-quarter of the prize money, an amount equal to some four years of salary. In May 1802 Captain William Bradley replaced Legge. That same month Cambrian came to serve as flagship to Admiral Mark Milbanke and later (July to March 1803) Vice-Admiral Sir Andrew Mitchell while on the North America and West Indies Station.

== Napoleonic Wars ==
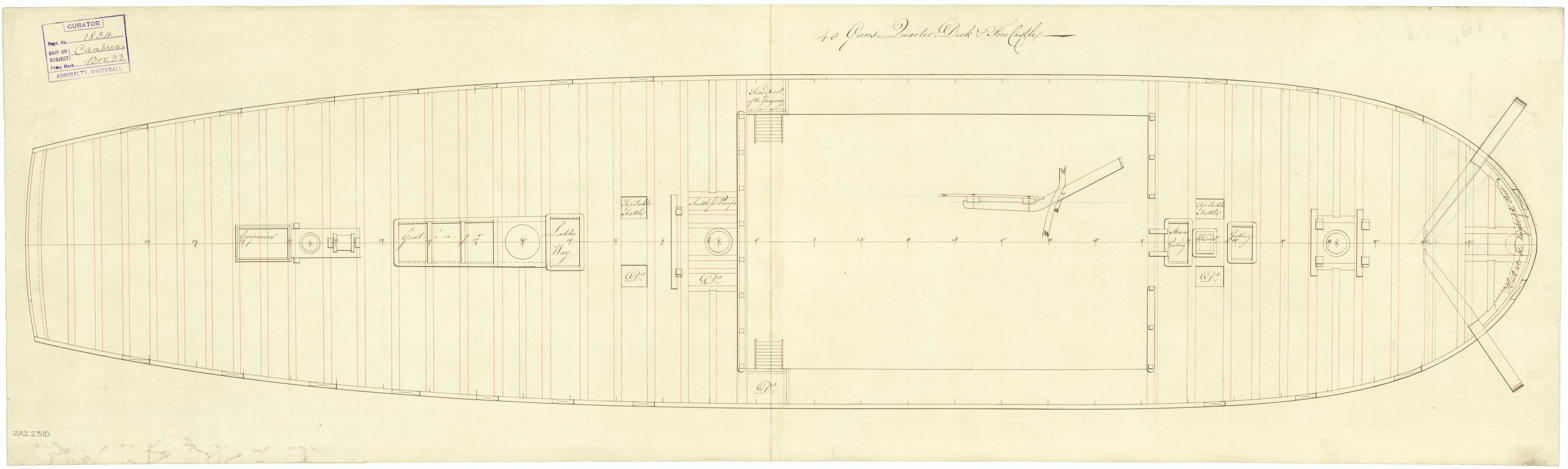
Deck, quarter and forecastle of Cambrian

In March 1804, Cambrian was under the command of Captain William Bradley and on her way to Bermuda when she captured two French privateers. On 22 March she captured the schooner Tison after a chase of 25 hours. Tison had been armed with six 9 and 12-pounder guns, which she threw overboard during the chase. She had a crew of 59 men under the command of Joseph Kastique, and had been out of Guadaloupe for 11 days buy had not captured anything. Four days later Cambrian captured the schooner Alexander (or Alexandre), which was armed with eight guns and had a crew of 68 men under the command of Charles La Marque. She had been cruising for 11 days but had not taken anything. Head money was paid in June 1827. (Note: A first-class share was worth £96 1s 3d; a fifth-class share, that of a seaman, was worth 5s 3 1/2d.)

In October 1804 Cambrian came under the command of Captain John Beresford. From June to November 1804, Cambrian and Leander had blockaded two French frigates in the port of New York. In November, the French vessels succeeded in escaping. The two were the Président and the other was supposedly the Revolutionnaire.

Then in May 1805, Cambrian transferred to the Halifax station, where she harassed French and Spanish shipping and captured several privateers and merchantmen. On 13 June her boats, under the command of Lieutenant George Pigot, boarded and captured the Spanish privateer schooner Maria, of 14 guns and 60 men. Somewhat uncharacteristically for privateers, the Spanish resisted, with the result that Cambrian sustained casualties of two dead and two wounded.

Next, Cambrian captured the French privateer schooner Matilda on 3 July, after a chase of 22 hours. Matilda, of 200 tons (BM), was armed with twenty 9-pounder guns and had a crew of 95 men. (Note: James reports that Matilda was armed with ten 8-pounder guns. However, James also gives Lieutenant Pigot's first name as Robert, whereas other accounts give it as George.) She surrendered in shoal water and if not for the efforts of Lieutenant Pigot in one of Cambrian's boats, Matilda's entire crew might have been lost. Matilda had earlier captured the letter of marque Clyde, which had been on her way to Liverpool. (Note: Clyde, of twelve 4-pounder guns and a crew of 30 men under the command of David Kilock, had received her letter on 20 November 1804.) Prior to her capture by Cambrian, Matilda had evaded capture by Heron.

=== Boat service ===
Then on 7 July Lieutenant Pigot again distinguished himself. He arrived off the harbour the day before and took the Matilda twelve miles up the St Marys River to attack three vessels reported to be there. All long the way militia and riflemen fired on Matilda. Eventually the British reached the vessels, which were lashed in a line cross the river. They consisted of a Spanish privateer schooner and her two prizes, the ship Golden Grove and the British brig Ceres, which the Spanish privateer had captured some two months earlier. The Spaniards had armed Golden Grove with eight 6-pounder guns and six swivels, and given a crew of 50 men. The brig too was armed with swivels and small arms. The Spanish schooner carried six guns and a crew of 70 men.

Pigot engaged the vessels for an hour, and after Matilda had grounded, took his crew in her boats and captured Golden Grove. The British then captured the other two vessels. Lastly, Pigot fired on a group of 100 militia and a field gun, dispersing them. The British had two men killed, and 14 wounded, including Pigot, who had received two bullet wounds to his head and one to a leg. Spanish casualties were reportedly 25 men killed (including five Americans) and 22 men wounded. A crowd of Americans on the Georgia side of the river watched the entire battle. Pigot was unable to extricate himself and his prizes from the river until 21 July, but during the entire period he remained in command except when he was getting his wounds dressed. For his efforts Pigot received a promotion to commander, and the Lloyd's Patriotic Fund awarded him a medal and a plate worth £50. (Note: Long gives the name of Pigot's vessel as the Spanish privateer Maria, but Bereford's letter states that she was the vessel they had taken on 3 July, making her Matilda.)

Cambrian arrived at Bermuda on 4 August, in company with Golden Grove, Ceres, and the privateer Matilda.

On 1 November, Cambrian captured Adeline.

=== Leander affair ===
In 1806, Cambrian came under the command of Captain John Nairne (acting). While under his command she, along with Leander and the ship-sloop Driver, was engaged in searching American vessels coming from foreign ports, for enemy property and contraband. This gave rise to the so-called Leander affair with the result that on 14 June President Thomas Jefferson issued a proclamation ordering Leander, Driver, and Cambrian immediately to quit US waters and forbidding them ever to return. He extended the same prohibition to all vessels that their respective captains might command. On 26 April, the day after the affair, Leander, Cambrian, and Driver captured the American ship Aurora.

Cambrian continued to cruise, including sailing to Charlestown to lift a blockade of the port by three French privateers. Later, Nairne sailed Cambrian back to Britain in order to be a witness at the court martial of Captain Henry Whitby of Leander for the murder of John Pierce, the American supposedly killed by a shot from Leander, which was the substance of the affair. (Whitby was acquitted.) Between April and June 1807 Cambrian was at Portsmouth, refitting.

=== Copenhagen ===
Captain the Honourable Charles Paget took command in May 1807. Cambrian then participated in the Expedition to Copenhagen. (Note: In July 1809, Cambrian shared in the prize money for the Danish vessels that the British seized. A petty officer's share was £22 11s; a seaman's share was £3 8s.) (Note: One of the midshipmen on Cambrian was Frederick Thesiger, later twice Lord Chancellor of Great Britain and the first Baron Chelmsford.) In October her captain was James Deans (acting), while Paget took up Admiral Gambier's offer to let him return to Britain in Nightingale with the duplicate despatches announcing Denmark's capitulation. Paget later resumed command. On 14 January 1808, Cambrian was under Paget's command when she captured the French ship Aeleon.

=== Spain's Mediterranean coast ===
On 9 May Paget sailed Cambrian for the Mediterranean. The next month he transferred to Leviathan. His successor was Captain Richard B. Vincent.

Captain Francis William Fane replaced Vincent in 1809. On 5 September 1810 Cambrian sailed from Tarragona with General Doyle and two xebecs carrying Spanish soldiers and some cannons. Their objective was the fort on Meda Gran in the Medes Islands, in the Bay of Rosas near the mouth of the River Ter. The next day the Spanish frigate Flora joined them. When it turned out that an assault on the fort was impossible, on 10 September Doyle led a landing party of soldiers and marines from the frigates to attack a battery of four 24-pounder guns (two mounted) at Bega (or Bagur). The attack was successful with the attackers capturing 36 men while sustaining no casualties. Then on 14 September boats from Cambrian assisted the Spanish in their attack on Palamós. The attack cost Cambrian three men wounded and the loss of a launch to fire from a French battery. On 17 September Cambrian left Palamós with the French cannon and prisoners that had been captured, together with Spanish General O'Donnell, who had been shot in the leg during the battle. Cambrian returned him to Tarragona on 17 September. General O'Donnell had the Spanish government strike a medal for the British officers involved in the two actions (in gold), and the same medal in silver for the Royal Marines at Bagur and the sailors in the boats at Palamós. (Note: Long states that the marines and sailors involved came from Kent and Volontaire, however, this appears to be incorrect. These two vessels were involved in a later attack on the coast. In all, only eight gold medals and reportedly some 600 silver medals were issued, though this last number appears excessive. It may result from confusion between the attacks for which the medals were awarded and the December attack on Palamós, which involved about 600 men from a British squadron.)

On 13 December British 350 sailors and 250 marines from Cambrian, the 74-gun third rates Kent and Ajax again attacked Palamós. (The sloops Sparrowhawk and Minstrel covered the landing.) The landing party destroyed six of eight merchant vessels with supplies for the French army at Barcelona, as well as their escorts, a national ketch of 14 guns and 60 men and two xebecs of three guns and thirty men each. The vessels were lying inside the mole under the protection of 250 French troops, a battery of two 24-pounders, and a 13" mortar in a battery on a commanding height. Although the attack was successful, the withdrawal was not. The British lost 33 men killed, 89 wounded, and 86 taken prisoner, plus one seaman who took the opportunity to desert. Cambrian alone lost one man killed, seven wounded, and four men missing, among them Fane, who had been taken prisoner. Captain Charles Bullen of Volontier then took command of Cambrian on 1 January 1811.

Bullen continued to support the Spanish in operations along the Catalan coast. On 14 April boats from Cambrian cut out a settee carrying grain from Port Vendee to Barcelona that had sheltered under the protection of batteries on the Medes Islands. More importantly, on 12 and 14 April, Cambrian and Volontaire took possession of St. Philion and Palamós. There they destroyed the batteries and took out their guns. This, together with the Spanish capture of Figueras, gave the Spanish control of almost all Catalonia, save Barcelona.

Returning to the Bay of Rosas, Bullen captured 19 merchant vessels off Cadaques. He sent six, which were loaded with wine and grain to Tarragona for the garrison there. In June, while serving in a battery ashore at Selva, he was badly wounded. Bullen quit Cambrian on 9 December and returned to England invalided.

Cambrian refitted at Gibraltar and then sailed to Malta. From there she convoyed a large number of French prisoners to Britain. On 20 November 1811 Cambrian arrived in Portsmouth. She was then paid off at Plymouth in December. She underwent substantial repair at Plymouth between May 1813 and September 1814, but then was laid up.

== Post-war ==
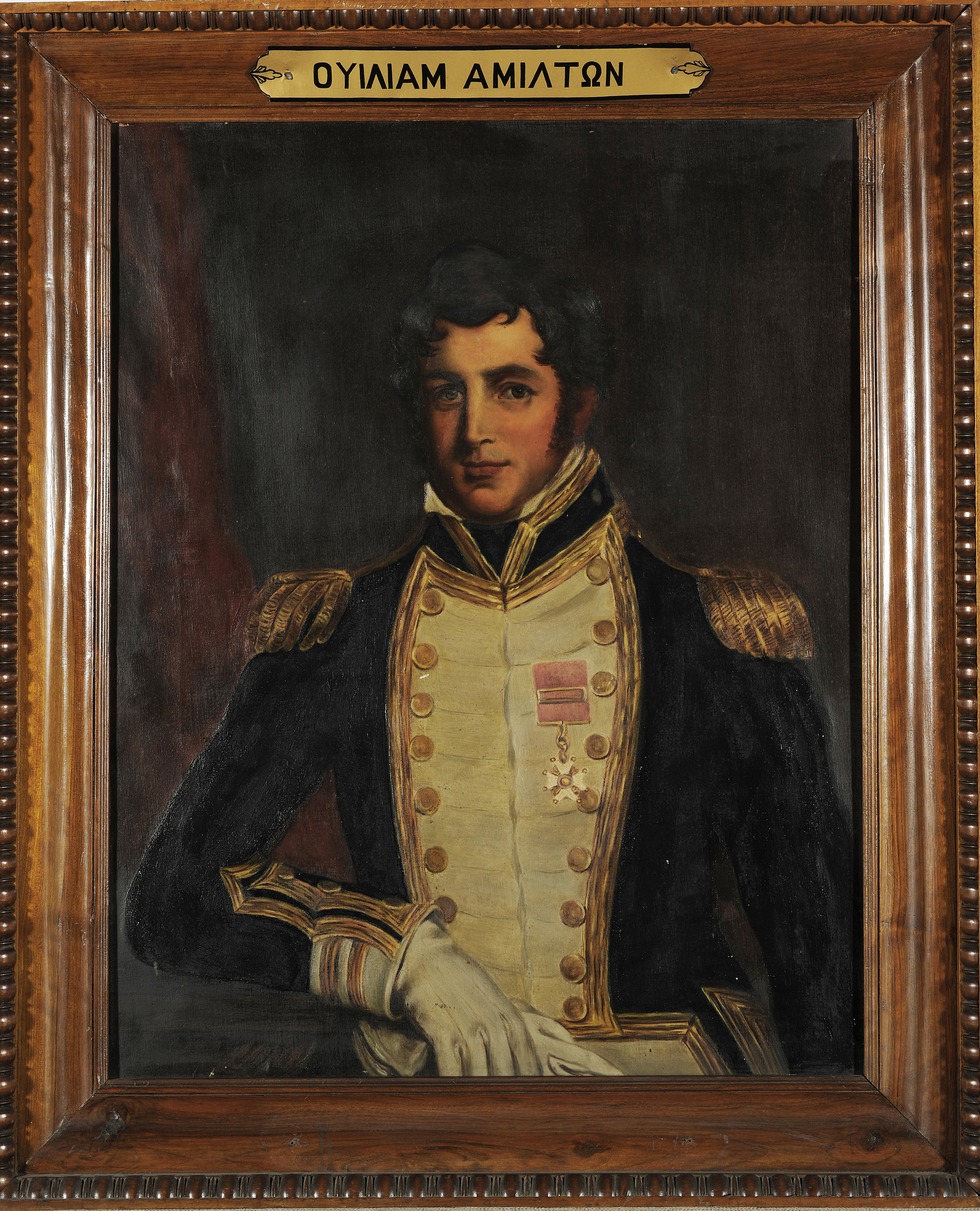
Gawen William Hamilton

Between July and October 1820 Cambrian was fitted for sea, and in July Captain Gawen Hamilton recommissioned her. He then conveyed Lord Strangford to be ambassador to the Ottoman court at Constantinople.

In October 1821, as a result of piracy in the region, Cambrian was escorting merchant shipping between the islands off Smyrna. Hamilton, though an advocate for the cause of Greek independence, was widely respected by Greeks and Ottomans for his impartiality in the conflict. After the Greeks captured Nauplia on 12 December 1821, they were still negotiating the surrender of the Ottoman troops in the fortress above the town when Cambrian arrived on 24 December. Hamilton arranged for the evacuation of the Ottoman troops with Theodoros Kolokotronis and the other Greek leaders. Cambrian herself took 500 on board, with another 900 going on board ships that Hamilton insisted the Greek government charter. Unfortunately, 67 of the Ottomans died of typhus on board Cambrian; several of her crew died of it as well. However, by intervening, Hamilton had staved off a massacre. (Note: The Greek government made Nauplia the first capital of an independent Greece.)

In November 1822, Midshipman Edward Codrington, one of her officers and the son of Admiral Sir Edward Codrington, drowned. Midshipman Codrington had been taking a cutter to Hydra when a squall overturned the boat, drowning him, a merchant, and three crewmen.

On 18 March 1824 Naiad captured Quattro Fratelli . Cambrian shared the prize money. (Note: A first-class share of the prize money was worth £6 11s 5 1/2d; a sixth-class share, that of an ordinary seaman, was worth 1s 2 1/4d.) That same year Hamilton conducted a mission to Tunis. He then sailed Cambrian back to Britain where she was paid off, but in July he recommissioned her for the Mediterranean.

In 1825 Cambrian was lead vessel of a small squadron in anti-piracy operations in the Archipelago, at Alexandria, and around the coasts of Syria. She shared in the destruction of two Greek pirate vessels on 31 January and another on 9 June. For the first vessel Cambrian was in company with Seringapatam and Cyrene. (Note: A first-class share of the prize money was worth £159 8s 3d; a sixth-class share was worth 10s 2 1/2d.) For the second, Cambrian was in company with Seringapatam and Alacrity. (Note: A first-class share of the prize money was worth £69 19s 2 1/2d; a sixth-class share was worth 4s 10 3/4d.) Cambrian alone destroyed another Greek pirate vessel on 27 July 1826. (Note: A first-class share of the prize money was worth £94 3s 4 1/2d; a sixth-class share was worth 5s 5 1/4d.)

The capture and destruction of the two pirate vessels on 31 January 1825 was an unusually sanguine affair. When the pirate vessels refused to surrender, Cambrian and Seringapatam sent in their boats to capture them. Each of the pirate vessels was armed with a gun and had a crew of about thirty men. Both resisted strongly before the British were able to overcome them. Cambrian had three men killed and five wounded; Seringapatam had three killed and eight wounded. All the pirates, save for a few who were captured, were killed or wounded.

On 27 July 1826 Cambrian's boats captured a pirate bombard and burnt a mistico on the Cycladic island of Tinos. (Note: Bombard in this context represents a type of small merchant vessel of two masts, not a bomb vessel.) Five pirates were killed and several wounded. Then in early September, Cambrian's marines landed on Andros where they burnt a pirate vessel and captured a bombard. During this period Alacrity and Seringapatam also succeeded in destroying several pirate vessels.

On 27 June 1827, boats from Cambrian and Rose destroyed a pirate vessel that had a crew of 30 men. (Note: A first-class share was worth £14; a sixth-class share was worth 1s 8 1/2d. A second distribution followed but was subject to deductions. A first-class share was worth £28, minus a deduction of £11 15s 6d; a sixth-class share was worth 1s 8 1/2d, minus a deduction of 7 1/4d.) Cambrian and Rose had fitted out three misticos that on 27 June 1827, at Andros, captured a row galley, armed with one gun. The galley's 35 crew members escaped ashore. On the galley the British found a log book belonging to Nimble, some oars from the British vessel Brothers, and several other English goods. Nimble had been sailing to Smyrna from London pirates plundered her of part of her cargo, stores, and men's clothes.

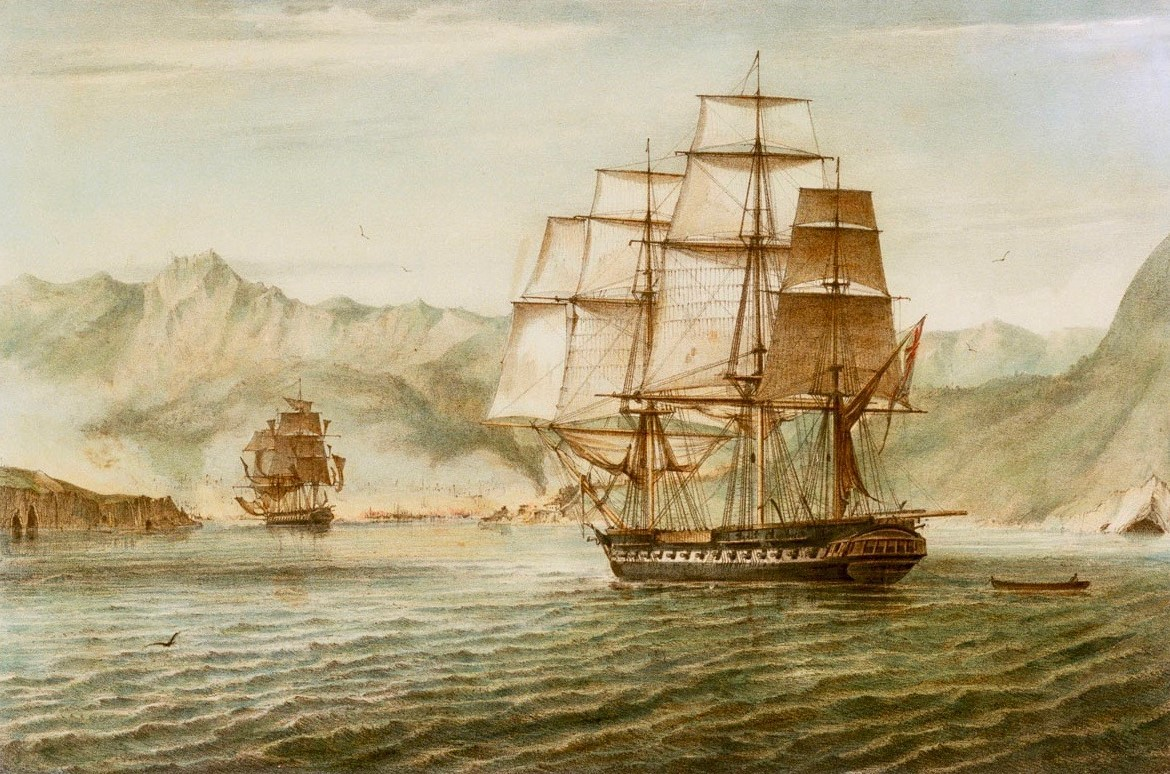
Glasgow and Cambrian at the Battle of Navarino, 20 Oct 1827, by George Philip Reinagle

On 14 October 1827, Cambrian, still under Captain Hamilton, joined the allied fleet just outside the Bay of Navarino. On the 20th, she entered the bay with the rest of the fleet, where she took part in the Battle of Navarino. Cambrian's casualties were light; she had one crew member killed and one wounded. For his role in the battle, Hamilton received the medal of the second class of the order of St. Anne of Russia and was made a member of the French order of St. Louis. In 1847 the Admiralty authorized the issuance of the Naval General Service Medal with clasp "Navarino" to all surviving claimants from the action.

== Fate ==
In January 1828, Cambrian was again involved in the suppression of piracy as part of a squadron under Commodore Sir Thomas Staines. Staines took a small squadron to the island of Grabusa, off Cape Busa (Vouxa) to deal with a nest of Greek pirates that had made the harbour there their home after the Greeks had taken possession of it early in the war against the Turks in Crete. The squadron consisted of Cambrian, Pelican, Isis, Rattlesnake, Zebra, Cameleon, and two French corvettes. In the port there were 14 Greek vessels, together with an Austrian and an Ionian merchantman that the pirates had taken. After the pirates had refused to surrender, the squadron opened fire and destroyed a number of the vessels. Marines from Pelican and Isis then landed to take possession of the fortress there. However, as the squadron left, Isis struck Cambrian, causing her to broadside the rocks in the narrow channel. Cambrian settled in shallow water and her entire crew left in an orderly manner. The strong swell then broke up Cambrian. (Note: A first-class share of the prize money for the goods captured from the pirates was worth £15 18s 11 1/4d; a sixth-class share was worth 4s 9 3/4.)
