= Nancy (1792 ship) =

History

Great Britain
- Name: Nancy
- Owner: 1792: Phynn & Co.; 1805:Burstall & Co.
- Builder: Barnard, Deptford
- Launched: 10 January 1792
- Fate: Burnt 17 June 1805

General characteristics
- Tons burthen: 250, or 354 (bm)
- Propulsion: Sail
- Armament: 10 × 6-pounder guns

Nancy was launched in 1792 and traded with Quebec. In 1793 she made one voyage for the British East India Company (EIC). On her return, the Sierra Leone Company purchased her, one of several vessels the company purchased to support their colony for Free Blacks. As she traded with Sierra Leone, a French privateer captured her, though the British Royal Navy recaptured her only days later. She then traded more widely. A French squadron captured her in 1805 and burnt her.

== Career ==
Nancy first appeared in the 1792 volume of Lloyd's Register with A. Patterson, master, Phynn & Co., owners, and trade London—Quebec.

EIC voyage (1793-1795): Captain Alexander Patterson sailed from the Lizard on 29 December 1793, bound for Bengal. Nancy reached Calcutta on 20 June 1794. She left Bengal on 3 September and by 25 September was at Madras. From there she reached Saint Helena on 10 December, and Kinsale on 12 February 1795. She arrived at Beachy Head on 26 February.

Year	Master	Owner	Trade	Source
1795	Patterson	Phyn & Co.	London—Quebec	LR
1800	Davidson	Phynn & Co.	London—Quebec; London—Sierra Leone	LR
1801	Davidson	Sierra Leone Company	London–Sierra Leone	LR

On 2 April 1801, as Nancy, Davidson master, was returning from Sierra Leone, the French privateer Braave captured Nancy at 50°42′N 12°14′W. Four days later, HMS Cambrian recaptured Nancy. Nancy arrived at Plymouth before 14 April. Cambrian shared the prize money with Venerable and Superb.

Year	Master	Owner	Trade	Source
1802	Davidson	Sierra Leone Company; Burstall & Co.	London–Sierra Leone; Hull–Nantes	LR

The Peace of Amiens having taken effect in early 1802, Nancy's new owners, operating out of Kingston upon Hull, started trading with France. With the resumption of war with France, they started trading more widely, sailing Nancy to the Mediterranean, the Baltic, and finally, the West Indies.

Year	Master	Owner	Trade	Source & notes
1803	Reynolds; F.Ruston	Burstall & Co.	Hull–Naples; Hull–Petersburg	LR; repairs 1802
1804	F.Ruston; P.Lamont	Burstall & Co.	Hull–Petersburg; Hull–Grenada	LR; repairs 1802
1805	W. Cook	Burstall & Co.	London—Antigua	LR; repairs 1802

== Fate ==
On 7 June 1805, Nancy, Cook, master, sailed from Antigua in a convoy of 15 merchantmen under the escort of HMS Netley and Barbadoes. (Note: Barbadoes was the former French privateer Braave, which had captured Nancy in 1801.) They had the misfortune on 8 June to encounter a Franco-Spanish fleet under Admiral Villeneuve. The two British warships managed to escape, but Villeneuve's fleet captured the entire convoy, valued at some five million pounds. He sent the convoy to Guadeloupe under the escort of the frigate Sirène. However, on her way Sirène encountered several British frigates. She escaped after burning the merchantmen on 17 June.
