= USRC James Madison =

Ship launched in 1807

History

United States
- Name: USRC James Madison
- Namesake: James Madison
- Ordered: 26 June 1807
- Launched: c.1807
- Commissioned: 1807
- Refit: 1811
- Captured: 22 August 1812
- Notes: Contrary to some reports, she did not become HMS Alban; that was the American vessel William Bayard.

United Kingdom
- Owner: Lord Belmore, of Enniskillen
- Acquired: 16 June 1813, by purchase
- Renamed: Osprey
- Home port: Killybegs, Donegal
- Fate: Sold 1819

Kingdom of the two Sicilies
- Owner: Ferdinand I of the Two Sicilies
- Acquired: 1819 by purchase
- Home port: Naples
- Fate: Unknown

General characteristics
- Tons burthen: 172 79/94 (bm; UK) per bill of sale; 224 4/94 per Letter of Marque; 201 18/94 per calc.
- Length: 86 ft 3 in (26.3 m)
- Beam: 22 ft 10 in (7.0 m)
- Depth of hold: 7 ft 11 in (2.4 m)
- Sail plan: Schooner; later brig
- Complement: Revenue cutter:20-25 peacetime service; 65-70 on wartime cruise; Privateer:40
- Armament: Revenue cutter: 6 × 6-pounder guns + 4 × 12-pounder carronades on wartime cruise; Privateer: 14 × 9-pounder carronades.

The USRC James Madison was a schooner named for Founding Father James Madison and launched in 1807 at Baltimore for service with the United States Revenue-Marine. During the first months of the War of 1812 she captured several merchant vessels, but in August 1812 HMS Barbadoes captured her. Lord Belmore, of Enniskillen, bought her and converted her to a privateer brig named Osprey. After the end of the Napoleonic Wars and the War of 1812 she became a yacht for a family trip to the eastern Mediterranean. In 1819, at the end of the trip, Bellmore sold her to Ferdinand I, King of Naples; her ultimate fate is unknown.

== Revenue cutter ==
On 26 June 1807, the Treasury Department of the United States authorized the Baltimore customs collector to build the cutter James Madison. She was completed in 1808. James Madison then sailed from Baltimore on 18 January 1809 to Savannah, Georgia, to take up station there. George Brooks became first mate of James Madison on 17 September 1810, and master on 19 December 1811.

After the outbreak of the War of 1812 in June, on 5 July, James Madison detained the British schooner Wade at Amelia Island, which at that time belonged to Spanish Florida. Wade's actual captors were US Navy gunboats and Wade was carrying pineapples, turtles, and 20,000 dollars in specie. Lloyd's List reported that American gunboats in St Mary's River had taken the Wade, whose master was named Johnson, and also a second vessel, from Nassau, whose master was named Pindar and which was carrying specie.

Brooks expanded the size of James Madison's crew to some 70 officers and men. He also had them armed, using borrowed funds. The size of her crew was anomalously large for a Revenue Marine vessel, suggesting that Brooks had intended to engage in privateering.

On 17 July 1812 Brooks declared that James Madison would sail from Charleston to intercept six British merchant vessels reported to be sailing up the coast from Jamaica without a naval escort. Six days later he succeeded in capturing the British brig Shamrock, May, master, of 300 tons bm, six guns, and a crew of 15 men. She had been sailing from London to Amelia Island with a cargo of arms and ammunition. Then on 1 August James Madison captured the brig Santa Rosa. James Madison sent Santa Rosa, which was sailing under Spanish colours, into Savannah.

James Madison's last cruise began on 15 August when she left Savannah in the company of the privateers Paul Jones, Hazard, and Spencer. James Madison separated from the other three and proceeded to sail well beyond her normal area of operations. On 20 August she encountered the Jamaica convoy of 47 merchant vessels, which were sailing under the protection of HMS Polyphemus, which was the flagship for the convoy, and HMS Barbadoes.

Brooks attempted to capture a vessel, but despite press reports at the time that two merchant ships were captured, failed.

== Capture ==
James Madison dogged the convoy until 21 August, when Brooks ordered a night attack on a ship he believed to be a large merchantman. Unfortunately, the "merchantman" proved to be the 32-gun frigate Barbadoes. James Madison fled and seemed to be outrunning the pursuing Barbadoes until the two ships were becalmed. Barbadoes launched three longboats to tow her to the James Madison, which surrendered in the face of overwhelming odds between 8 and 10 AM on 22 August. She was about 250 miles southeast of Savannah, Georgia at the time. At the time of her capture, James Madison was pierced for 14 guns, carried ten, but had thrown two overboard during the chase. She had a crew of 65 or 70 men. Captain Huskisson, of Barbadoes, reported that she was seven days out of Savannah but had made no captures. He described her as coppered and copper-fastened, two years old, and a remarkably fast sailer. (Note: Lloyd's Marine List gave the description of James Madison as a schooner of nine guns with a crew of 70 men, and named the captor as Polyphemus.)

The British immediately fitted out James Madison for the protection of the fleet. They put two officers and 40 men on board, drawn from Barbadoes and her existing crew. On 26 August a hurricane came up that scattered the vessels of the convoy. It also totally dis-masted Barbadoes and sprung Polyphemus's main and foremasts. On 3 September an American privateer schooner of 14 guns started shadowing James Madison and the vessels she was escorting. During the subsequent four days the privateer stayed close enough to exchange occasional shots with James Madison, but did not succeed in capturing anything. On 3 October Polyphemus and James Madison arrived separately at Portsmouth.

Despite Huskisson's glowing description, the Royal Navy did not take her into service. The Navy surveyed her on 13 October 1812 and found her unfit for British naval service as she was too slight and exhibited some rotten timber.

== American aftermath ==
The British paroled Brooks and his officers and sent them to New York in the cartel brig Diamond, which arrived there on 24 November. Most of the crew remained as prisoners of war on prison hulks in Portsmouth, England. Some were sent to Melville Island Prison at Halifax, Nova Scotia. Four of James Madison's crew, March Hart, Charles, James Lewis, and John Bulloch, were found to be slaves of Savannah mayor William B. Bulloch. Instead of being emancipated, the four men were sent to the Royal Naval Dockyard, Bermuda where they served as the "King's Slaves"; at least one of the four died in Bermuda.

On 28 December Secretary of the Treasury Albert Gallatin wrote in response to a letter from the Customs Collector at Boston:

A Revenue Cutter cannot be expressly fitted and employed for the purpose of cruising against an enemy except under the 98th Section of the collection law in which case the Cutter must be placed under the direction of the Secretary of the Navy.

Brooks does not appear to have served again as a master on a revenue cutter.

== Privateer ==
Lord Belmore bought James Madison on 16 June 1813 and had her converted from schooner to brig rig. He also renamed her Osprey, with home port of Killybegs in Donegal. Later, Belmore had her armed; her warrant as a letter of marque against the United States named Richard Chambers as master and the size of her crew as 30 men. However, it bore the date 27 August 1814, which ex post was quite late in the war. There is no sign in either the London Gazette or Lloyd's List of Osprey taking any prizes.

== Lord Belmore's yacht ==
Around 1817, Lord Belmore used Osprey for a family cruise to the Eastern Mediterranean. Her captain was Lord Belmore's brother, Captain Armar Lowry-Corry, RN. The party included Belmore's wife, the Countess Juliana, their two sons, their lapdog Rosa, the family doctor, Dr. Robert Richardson, M.D. (Edinburgh), and the vicar, Mr. Holt. They visited Malta, Sicily, Italy, the Ionian Islands, Greece, Rome, and Alexandria. They also sailed up the Nile as far as Luxor in three local boats.

Lord Belmore apparently had two hobbies in Egypt. One hobby was collecting antiquities; the other hobby was carving his name on Egyptian antiquities. After Egypt, the family traveled to Palestine and Jerusalem. In 1819 when the family was done with their cruise, Belmore sold Osprey to the King of Naples and the family returned home.

== See also ==
- USS James Madison (SSBN-627)
