= HMS Barbadoes (1804) =

British sailing frigate (1804–1812)

History

France
- Name: Brave
- Builder: Probably built in Bordeaux
- Launched: circa 1799
- Captured: 1803

General characteristics
- Displacement: c. 1,000 tons
- Tons burthen: 611 (French; "of load")
- Length: Overall: 43.5 m (142 ft 9 in); Keel: 38.00 m (124 ft 8 in)
- Beam: 10.72 m (35 ft 2 in)
- Draught: 5.2 m (17 ft 1 in)
- Propulsion: Sails
- Armament: 26 × 12-pounder guns

United Kingdom
- Name: Barbadoes
- Namesake: Barbados
- Acquired: c.1803 by capture
- Fate: Gift to Royal Navy 1804

United Kingdom
- Name: HMS Barbadoes
- Acquired: 1804 by gift
- Commissioned: October 1804
- Fate: Wrecked 27 September 1812

General characteristics
- Class & type: Originally: 32-gun Fifth-rate; Later: 28-gun Sixth-rate
- Tons burthen: Originally: 77543/94 (bm); Remeasured: 79962/94 (bm)
- Length: Overall:139 ft 8 in (42.6 m); Keel:117 ft 6 1/2 in (35.8 m)
- Beam: 35 ft 2 5/8 in (10.7 m)
- Depth of hold: 10 ft 3 in (3.1 m) (overall)
- Propulsion: Sails
- Complement: 195
- Armament: Upper deck: 24 × 9-pounder guns; QD: 8 × 24-pounder carronades; Fc: 2 × 6-pounder guns + 2 × 24-pounder carronades
- Notes: Plans are available in Lyon.

HMS Barbadoes was originally a French privateer and then a slave ship named Brave or Braave. A British slave ship captured her in September 1803. From 1803 to 1804 she became the British privateer Barbadoes for a few months. In 1804 the inhabitants of Barbados purchased her and donated her to the Royal Navy, which took her into service as HMS Barbadoes. She wrecked on 27 September 1812.

== French privateer ==
Barbadoes was a privateer named Braave, or Brave. The key source for British warships declares that she was built in Bordeaux in 1799 and captured on 16 March 1804, or in May 1803, in either case in the West Indies. In both cases it attributes the capture to HMS Loire. HMS Loire did capture a privateer named Braave on 16 March 1804, but on the Irish station, not in the West Indies. Furthermore, Braave, was armed with sixteen 12 and 6-pounder guns and had a crew of 110 men. She therefore appears to have been about half the size of the vessel that became Barbadoes.

There was a French vessel named Brave that Lloyd's List reported the British had brought into St Lucia in 1803. Lloyd's List referred to her as being the former privateer Brave, and to have been coming from Africa. The vessel in question was the negrier (slave ship) Brave that the British captured in 1803, in one account as she was coming from West Africa. Brave, under the command of Jean-David Sers and with owner Jacques Conte, had embarked 760 (or 733) captives in West Africa and arrived at an unspecified port in the British Caribbean with 700. (Note: Several sources give this Brave a burthen of 364 or 386 tons, about half of that of Barbadoes, or the Brave owned by Conte, but consistent with the Brave that Loire had captured.)

By a French account, two privateers from Liverpool had captured Brave of the coast of Angola on 14 September 1803 after an action of two hours that left eight Frenchmen dead and 14 wounded. By British accounts, there was only one captor, the Liverpool slave ship Tamer, which suffered five men killed and seven wounded in the engagement. Furthermore, although Tamer and Brave had possibly stopped at St Lucia, they sailed on to Barbados. On the way, Tamer developed a leak and foundered. Brave carried the crew and slaves of both vessels into Barbados.

French sources describe Brave as a privateer frigate based in Bordeaux and probably built there circa 1799. She was pierced for 40 guns. From 1799 to 1800 she was under a Captain Dreans. From 1800 to September 1800 she was under François Beck.

On 2 April 1801, as the letter-of-marque Nancy, Davidson master, was returning from Sierra Leone, the French privateer Braave captured Nancy at 50°42′N 12°14′W. Four days later, HMS Cambrian recaptured Nancy. Nancy arrived at Plymouth before 14 April.

On 12 May 1801, Lloyd's List (LL) reported that the French privateer Braave had captured Nimble, Nuttell, master, as she was sailing from Demerara to Liverpool. HMS Révolutionnaire recaptured Nimble and Marina, another vessel that Braave had also taken.

In its next issue, Lloyd's List reported that HMS Glenmore had recaptured two merchant vessels that had fallen prey to the French privateer Braave. One vessel was Camilla, Preston, master, which had been sailing from Grenada to Liverpool. The other was Guiana Planter, Wedge, master, which had been sailing from St Kitts to Portsmouth. Glenmore sent Guiana Planter into Cork.

Braave later captured six more merchant vessels, Shedden, Victory, Vine, Ann, Urania, and Cecilia. Braave put all her prisoners on Ann, Silk, master, and let her go. Glenmore recaptured Urania and set off after Braave. Glenmore then recaptured West Indian, Victory, Vine, and Cecilia. They and Urania all arrived at Cork.

From 1802 to June 1803 Braave served as a merchantman under Jean-David Conte. He had purchased her from Jacques Ségur. She sailed on 18 June 1802 for the Indian Ocean under the command of Captain David Sers. She carried a dozen passenger and two cargoes, one cargo of goods intended for the slave trade with Mozambique, and one, consisting in particular of white and red wine, for the French settlers at Isle de France (Mauritius). Brave arrived at Port Louis on 9 September after a record-setting voyage. The plan had been that the local merchants Tabois and Dubois would hire her for 50,000 piastres to sail to India's Coromandel Coast to acquire textiles. Instead, the merchants provided locally available textiles. It is possible that Brave traded with Africa's east coast, while waiting to sail to the west. She sailed for Angola in late April 1803.

As discussed above, the British captured Brave on 14 September, together with her 750 or so captives and 300,000 francs of Indian merchandise.

== British privateer ==
In September 1804 Ceres, Penelope, and Thetis, were one day out of Barbados when they encountered a French privateer. They were able to repulse the privateer and came into Barbados. There the governor informed them that the privateer they had encountered was Buonaparte, and he dispatched the "private ship of war" Barbadoes in pursuit.

Barbadoes was the former French privateer Braave, and this was her second cruize since the British had captured her. On her first cruize she reportedly had captured the French privateer that had captured the British sloop of war Lilly and had taken the French privateer into Barbados. The Lilly in question was probably the vessel that the French privateer Dame-Ambert had captured on 15 July 1804, making Dame-Ambert the privateer that Barbadoes had captured. (Note: Dame-Ambert was formerly the British packet ship Marlborough, captured in 1803. Dame-Ambert became a privateer schooner commissioned in Guadeloupe under Charles Lamarque with 75 to 140 men and sixteen 6-pounder guns.)

== Royal Navy frigate ==
The inhabitants of Barbados purchased Barbadoes and presented her to the Admiralty. She was initially rated as a 32-gun fifth rate; she was later rated as a 28-gun sixth rate.

Captain Joseph Nourse commissioned Barbadoes in October 1804 in the West Indies. Four days into her first cruize, on 17 October, she captured the French privateer Napoleon, of 18 guns and 150 men under the command of enseigne de vaisseau Suyrvens Pitot. She was nine days out of Guadeloupe also on her first cruize, and had captured nothing. Barbadoes had encountered Napoleon at 17°40′N 59°54′W and had captured her after a chase of 13 hours during which Napoleon had thrown two of her guns overboard. Napoleon was the former Duke of Kent Packet. (Note: Duke of Kent had been taken around June 1804 while sailing from Falmouth to Barbados and Jamaica. Her captors had taken her into Guadaloupe.)

Then in November Barbadoes captured the French privateer Heureux of ten 6-pounder guns and 80 men. She was nine days out of Guadaloupe and had made no captures. During the chase Heureux had thrown all her guns overboard.

On 8 April 1805 Barbadoes captured the French privateer Desirée, of 14 guns and 71 men. Desirée replied to several broadsides with small arms fire, and as a result suffered seven men killed or wounded.

In June 1805 Barbadoes was in company with Netley as they escorted a convoy of 15 merchant vessels back to Britain. They had the misfortune on 8 June to encountered a Franco-Spanish fleet under Admiral Villeneuve. The two British warships managed to escape, but Villeneuve's fleet captured the entire convoy, valued at some five million pounds. Villeneuve sent the convoy to Guadeloupe under the escort of the frigate Sirène. On her way Sirène encountered several British frigates. She escaped after burning the merchantmen.

Barbadoes arrived at Portsmouth on 17 June and was laid up. Between May 1809 and June 1810 she underwent a large repair. Captain Brian Hodgson commissioned her in May 1810 and sailed for the East Indies on 5 September. Early into the voyage, on 22 september, Barbadoes captured Gallicia and General Palafox. In July 1811 Hodgson transferred to HMS Owen Glendower (1808), and Captain Edward Rushworth replaced him on Barbadoes.

On 25 August 1811, Barbados, Captain Rushworth, and Hotspur captured Eseperance, of Havre de Grace, and Guillaume Chorede (or Guillaume Chere), from Cherbourg, both laden with timber. The captured vessels arrived in Portsmouth.

On 7 September 1811 Barbadoes was in company with the brig-sloop Goshawk cruising eastward of Cape Barfleur. There they encounter seven French gun-brigs coming from Boulogne. Each gun-brig carried three long 24-pounder guns and a mortar, and a crew of 75 men. Barbadoes and Goshawke chased the gunbrigs into Calvados, driving one of them on shore.

Barbadoes subsequently sailed on 23 November to Jamaica as an escort to a large fleet of merchantmen. Captain Rushworth died on 14 June 1812, aged 25. Rushworth's replacement was Captain Thomas Huskisson.

On 22 August 1812, the USRC James Madison was engaged in privateering, dogging a convoy under escort by Barbadoes. Barbadoes captured James Madison after a seven-hour chase. James Madison was pierced for 14 guns, and carried ten, but had thrown two overboard during the chase. She had a crew of 65 or 70 men. Captain Huskisson, of Barbadoes, reported that she was seven days out of Savannah but had made no captures. He described her as coppered and copper-fastened, two years old, and a remarkably fast sailer.

== Fate ==
On the evening of 27 September 1812 Barbadoes was at Sable Island escorting three vessels from Bermuda to Newfoundland. She grounded and it proved impossible to free her. When the pumps could not keep up with the water entering from leaks, Captain Huskisson decided to abandon ship; one man drowned as the crew tried to reach shore. Before they left, 6300 dollars that she carried were lowered into the water attached to buoys marking the spot.

Two other vessels in the convoy also wrecked on Sable Island. The surviving vessel went into Halifax, Nova Scotia. There Admiral Sir John Warren, commander in chief of the North America and West Indies Station, despatched HMS Shannon and the schooner Bream to rescue the crew and retrieve the money Barbadoes was carrying. The rescuers arrived on 10 October, almost two weeks after Barbadoes had wrecked.

The subsequent court-martial of Huskisson, his officers, and crew blamed the loss of Barbadoes on a very strong current having carried Barbadoes onto the island.
