= Mistico (boat) =

Type of sailboat

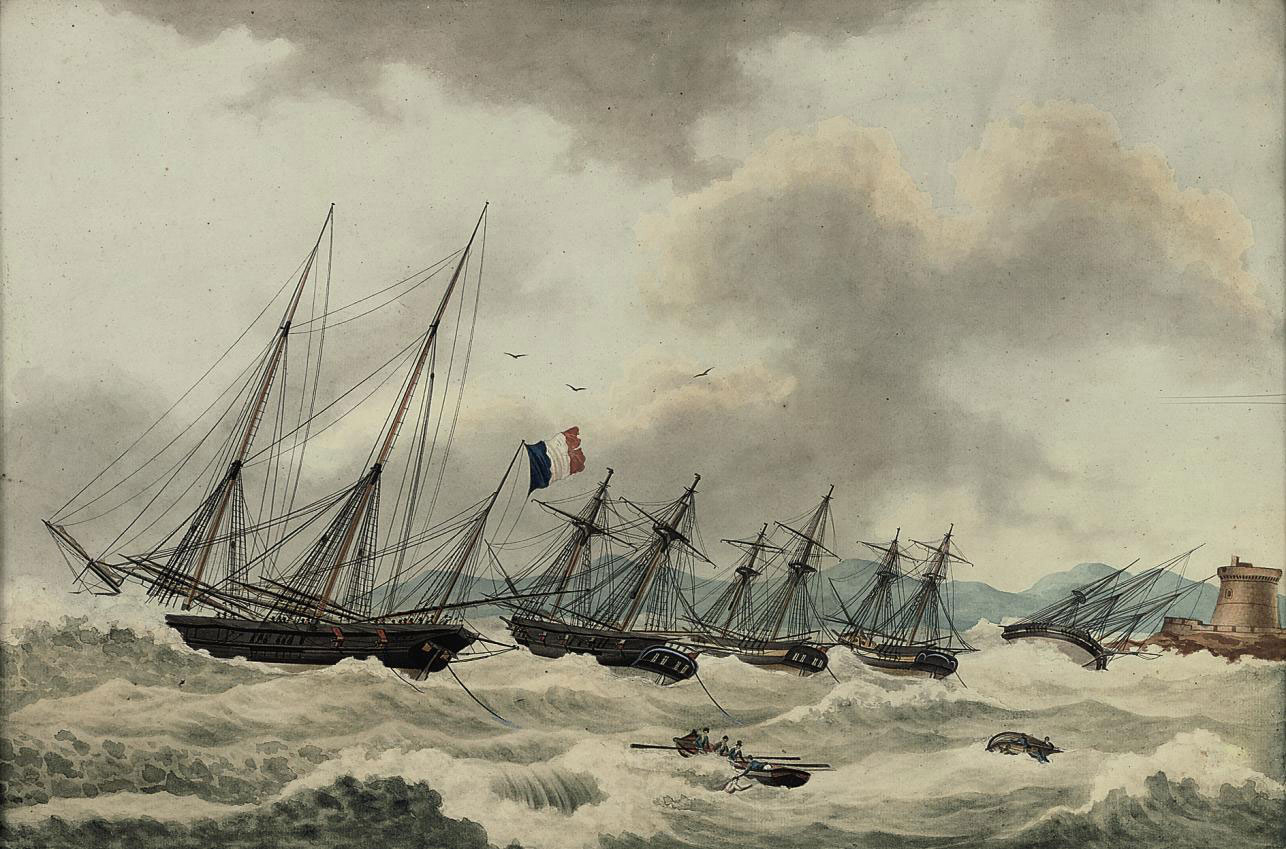
The French fleet riding out a storm in the bay of Tabarco off the Barbary coast, in the foreground a Mistico, by Nicolas Cammillieri

A mistico was a large sailing coaster used in the Mediterranean in the 18th and 19th centuries. Misticos were decked vessels with long, low hulls and had two masts amidships that carried two lateen or settee sails and a jib. They ranged in size from 40 to 80 tons (bm), and had crews of five to nine men. They were popular with Greek pirates in the Aegean and resembled the felucca, and the xebec.

- On 25 October 1806, the Spanish privateer mistico Generalísimo, of four guns and 70 men, captured HM gunboat Hannah, of two guns and 28 men, in the Straits of Gibraltar.
- In 1825–26 HMS Cambrian was the lead vessel of a small squadron engaged in anti-piracy operations in the Archipelago, at Alexandria, and around the coasts of Syria. On 27 July 1826 Cambrian's boats captured a pirate bombard and burnt a mistico on the Cycladic island of Tinos.

== See also ==
- Xebec
