= Nimble (1786 ship) =

History

Great Britain
- Name: Nimble
- Launched: 1781
- Fate: Wrecked circa 1804

General characteristics
- Tons burthen: 1786:180; 1786:229, or 231 (bm)
- Complement: 1795:12; 1799:30; 1800:30
- Armament: 1795:8 × 3&4-pounder guns; 1799:18 × 4&6&12-pounder guns; 1800:18 × 6&12-pounder guns

Nimble was built in Folkestone in 1781, possibly under another name. In 1786 Nimble was almost rebuilt and lengthened. Between 1786 and 1798 she made nine voyages as a whaler in the British Southern Whale Fishery. Between 1799 and 1804 she made four voyages from Liverpool as a slave ship in the triangular trade in enslaved people. On her first voyage as to gather captives she detained a neutral vessel, an action that resulted in a court case. On her second voyage to gather captives, a French privateer captured her, but the Royal Navy recaptured her. She was wrecked in 1804 or so after she had delivered her captives to St Thomas.

== Career ==
Nimble first appeared in Lloyd's Register (LR) in 1786. Her career before then is currently obscure.

Year	Master	Owner	Trade	Source & notes
1786	Gardner	Montgomery	London–Southern Fishery	LR

1st whaling voyage (1786): Captain Francis Gardner sailed in 1786 for the Brazil Banks. Nimble arrived in the Downs on 5 July 1786 from the Brazils.

2nd whaling voyage (1787): Captain Gardner gathered 30 tuns of sperm oil, 16 tuns of whale oil, 10 cwt of whale bone. In April 1787 Nimble, Gardiner, master, was reported at Trindade with 30 tons of sperm oil and 20 tons of "black oil".

3rd whaling voyage (1788): Captain Gardner gathered 51 tuns of sperm oil. Nimble, Gardner, master, arrived back at the Downs on 21 July 1788.

4th whaling voyage (1789): Captain Gardner was reported to have been at 5°S 8°E (about 270 miles west of Pointe-Noire), with about 250 barrels of sperm oil. Nimble returned to Gravesend on 3 October 1789 with 25 tuns of sperm oil, 70 tuns of whale oil, and 42 cwt of whale bone.

5th whaling voyage (1790–1791): Captain Gardner sailed Nimble in late 1789 or early 1790. Lloyd's List reported on 22 January 1790 that Nimble, Gardner, master, was on shore at Leigh (possibly Leigh-on-Sea), while on her way to the South Fishery. She was gotten off with little damage and returned to Gravesend. On 27 February 1790 she was at the Downs on her way to the South Seas. She returned to Gravesend on 16 February 1791.

6th whaling voyage (1791–1792): Captain Gardner sailed on 28 May 1791. Nimble returned on 27 July 1792.

It is not clear where Nimble was between late 1792 and mid-1795. The data in LR was unchanged from 1792 to 1794.

Year	Master	Owner	Trade	Source
1795	Dickon	A.Gibbon	London–South Seas	LR; raised and almost rebuilt 1786, & good repair 1795.

7th whaling voyage (1795–1796): Captain Christopher Dickson acquired a letter of marque on 7 July 1795. At some point thereafter Dickson (or Dixon) sailed for the Brazil Banks. Nimble returned to Britain on 19 April 1796 with 111 tuns of whale oil and 80cwt of whale bone.

Year	Master	Owner	Trade	Source
1796	Richardson; Barton	A.Gibbon	London–South Seas	LR; raised and almost rebuilt 1786, & good repair 1795.

8th whaling voyage (1796–1797): Captain Richardson sailed from London on 10 June 1796. A Nimble, Hook, master, was reported off Brazil in January 1797. Nimble, Maddick, master, returned to Gravesend from the South Seas on 28 April.

9th whaling voyage (1797–1798): Captain Holland Barton sailed from Deal, bound for the South Seas via Portsmouth, on 17 August 1797. Nimble, Barton, master, returned to Gravesend from the South Seas on 21 October 1798.

Year	Master	Owner	Trade	Source & notes
1799	H.Burton; J.Blake	A.Gibbon; Illegible	London–Southern Fishery; Liverpool–Africa	LR; raised and almost rebuilt 1786, & good repair 1795.

The changed data in the online copy of LR for 1799 was hand-written, in ink, in an 18th/19th century style. Immediately subsequent issues of LR and the Register of Shipping showed Nimble still sailing to the South Seas. This led at least one source to show her still engaged in whaling. However, ownership had changed to Liverpool and she had become a slave ship.

1st voyage transporting enslaved people (1799–1800): Captain James Blake acquired a letter of marque on 12 March 1799. In March, off Cape Finisterre, Blake stopped the Danish brig Rebecca by firing a warning shot and then ramming into her, putting his own men aboard. He held the Captain Brunn and a passenger overnight on Nimble and then let them return to Rebecca as Rebecca's papers were in order, proving her a neutral. On his return, Captain Brunn discovered that Blake and his men had vandalized Rebecca, and made off with portable valuables and a sack of silver. Brunn sued Blake before the King's Bench, but on 18 December 1801 the judge dismissed the suit on the grounds that there had been no personal injury; the jury agreed. The judge did suggest that Captain Brunn would receive redress in the Admiralty Court.

On 4 April 1799 Captain Blake sailed from Liverpool, bound for Cabinda. In 1799, 156 vessels sailed from English ports, bound for Africa to acquire and transport enslaved people; 134 of the vessels sailed from Liverpool.

Nimble arrived at Kingston, Jamaica with 358 captives, having embarked 366, for a 2% mortality rate. She sailed from Kingston on 15 February 1800 and arrived back at Liverpool on 29 April. She had left Liverpool with 36 crew members and she suffered four crew deaths on her voyage.

After the passage of Dolben's Act in 1788, masters received a bonus of £100 for a mortality rate of under 2%; the ship's surgeon received £50. For a mortality rate between two and three per cent, the bonus was halved. There was no bonus if mortality exceeded 3%.

2nd voyage transporting enslaved people (1800–1801): Captain Thomas Nuttall acquired a letter of marque on 13 June 1800. He sailed from Liverpool on 24 July. In 1800, 133 vessels sailed from English ports, bound for Africa to acquire and transport enslaved people; 120 of the vessels sailed from Liverpool.

Nimble arrived in Demerara on 6 January 1801.

In May Lloyd's List reported that the French privateer Braave had captured Nimble, Nuttell, master, as she was sailing from Demerara to Liverpool. HMS Révolutionnaire recaptured Nimble and Marina, another vessel that Braave had also taken. (Note: Jn. Barry had built Marina, of 250 tons (bm), at Whitby in 1794.)

In 1801, 23 British slave ships were lost. The source for this data does not show any losses on the homeward-bound leg of the voyages, perhaps because Révolutionnaire had recaptured Nimble. During the period 1793 to 1807, war, rather than maritime hazards or resistance by the captives, was the greatest cause of vessel losses among British slave vessels.

Nimble arrived back in Liverpool on 23 May. She had left Liverpool with 33 crew members and suffered four crew deaths on the voyage.

3rd enslaving voyage (1801–1802): Captain Hugh Bowland sailed from Liverpool on 18 December 1801. In 1801, 147 vessels sailed from English ports, bound for Africa to acquire and transport enslaved people; 122 of the vessels sailed from Liverpool.

Nimble gathered her captives on the Windward Coast (Assini–Nunez). She arrived at Tortola with 226 captives on 2 August 1802. She delivered some slaves there and others at St Thomas. She sailed for Liverpool on 9 September and arrived there on 20 October. She had left Liverpool with 26 crew members and she suffered no crew deaths on the voyage.

Year	Master	Owner	Trade	Source
1803	T.Chamley; T.Bridge	G.Cafe (or G.Case)	Liverpool–Africa	LR; raised and almost rebuilt 1786, good repair 1795, large repair 1803

4th enslaving voyage (1803–1804): Captain Thomas Bridge sailed from Liverpool on 26 May 1803, bound for Africa. In 1803, 99 vessels sailed from English ports, bound for Africa to acquire and transport enslaved people; 83 of the vessels sailed from Liverpool.

On 17 July 1804, Nimble, Bridge, master, was passing Barbados when she would have been captured had not Mary Ann accompanied her for three days.

Nimble arrived in St Thomas on 27 July 1804 with 257 captives.

== Fate ==
In September 1804 Lloyd's List reported that Nimble, Bridges, master, had arrived at St Thomas's from Africa and had sold her captives there. The Trans Atlantic Slave Trade database reported that Nimble, Bridges, master, had been wrecked after she had disembarked her captives. She had left Liverpool with 41 crew members and had suffered 11 crew deaths on her voyage.
