= List of ship launches in 1806 =

The list of ship launches in 1806 includes a chronological list of some ships launched in 1806.

Date	Ship	Class	Builder	Location	Country	Notes
4 January	Ferret	Cruizer-class brig-sloop	Benjamin Tanner	Dartmouth	United Kingdom	For Royal Navy.
6 January	Assam	West Indiaman	Brocklebank	Lancaster	United Kingdom	For private owner.
7 January	Fancy	Confounder-class gun-brig	John Preston	Yarmouth	United Kingdom	For Royal Navy.
14 January	Leveret	Cruizer-class brig-sloop	John King	Dover	United Kingdom	For Royal Navy.
14 January	Pandora	Cruizer-class brig-sloop	John Preston	Great Yarmouth	United Kingdom	For Royal Navy.
23 January	Electra	Seagull-class brig-sloop	James Betts	Mistleythorn	United Kingdom	For Royal Navy.
30 January	Kingston	Merchantman	Holt & Richardson	Whitby	United Kingdom	For Atkinso & Co.
January	Le Cosmopoli	Privateer			France	For private owner.
3 February	Courageux	Téméraire-class ship of the line		Lorient	France	For French Navy.
4 February	Julia	Seagull-class brig-sloop	Jabez Bayley	Ipswich	United Kingdom	For Royal Navy.
9 February	Frolic	Cruizer-class brig-sloop	Nicholas Bools & William Good	Bridport	United Kingdom	For Royal Navy.
17 February	Racehorse	Cruizer-class brig-sloop	Hamilton & Breed	Hastings	United Kingdom	For Royal Navy.
18 February	Alexandria	Thames-class frigate	Nicholas Diddams	Portsmouth	United Kingdom	For Royal Navy.
February	Richmond	Confounder-class gun-brig	Greenwood & Kidwell	Itchenor	United Kingdom	For Royal Navy.
February	Skylark	Seagull-class brig-sloop	William Rowe	Newcastle upon Tyne	United Kingdom	For Royal Navy.
6 March	Lavinia	Frigate	Jacobs & Sons	Milford Haven	United Kingdom	For Royal Navy.
21 March	Belette	Cruizer-class brig-sloop	John King	Dover	United Kingdom	For Royal Navy.
22 March	Trafalgar	Merchantman	Brockbank	Lancashire	United Kingdom	For Thomas Hinde, or Samuel Hinderland and William Hinde.
March	Satellite	Seagull-class brig-sloop	Hills & Co.	Sandwich	United Kingdom	For Royal Navy.
1 April	Lord Collingwood	Merchantman	R & J Bulmer	South Shields	United Kingdom	For Bulmer & Co.
5 April	Vénus	Gloire-class frigate		Havre de Grâce	France	For French Navy.
5 April	Manche	Hortense-class frigate	Jacques Bonard	Cherbourg	France	For French Navy.
11 April	Cuckoo	Cuckoo-class schooner	James Lovewell	Great Yarmouth	United Kingdom	For Royal Navy.
11 April	Woodcock	Cuckoo-class schooner	Crane & Holmes	Great Yarmouth	United Kingdom	For Royal Navy.
12 April	Wagtail	Cuckoo-class schooner	James Lovewell	Great Yarmouth	United Kingdom	For Royal Navy.
19 April	Ariel	Merlin-class sloop	Palmer	Great Yarmouth	United Kingdom	For Royal Navy.
19 April	Crocodile	Banterer-class post ship	Simon Temple	South Shields	United Kingdom	For Royal Navy.
21 April	Richard Steward	Merchantman	Jenkins	Weymouth	United Kingdom	For Captain Langrish.
24 April	Mary	Full-rigged ship		Liverpool	United Kingdom	For Mr. Aspinal.
26 April	Crane	Cuckoo-class schooner	Custance & Stone	Great Yarmouth	United Kingdom	For Royal Navy.
26 April	Pigeon	Cuckoo-class schooner	Custance & Stone	Great Yarmouth	United Kingdom	For Royal Navy.
26 April	Quail	Cuckoo-class schooner	Custance & Stone	Great Yarmouth	United Kingdom	For Royal Navy.
April	Marquis of Lansdowne	Catamaran		Southampton	United Kingdom	For private owner.
5 May	Shannon	Leda-class frigate	Brindley	Frindsbury	United Kingdom	For Royal Navy.
15 May	Raduga	Volga-class brig	G. I. Koshkin	Kazan	Russia	For Imperial Russian Navy.
25 May	Volga	Volga-class brig	G. I. Koshkin	Kazan	Russia	For Imperial Russian Navy.
17 May	Magpie	Cuckoo-class schooner	William Rowe	Newcastle upon Tyne	United Kingdom	For Royal Navy.
19 May	Jackdaw	Cuckoo-class schooner	William Rowe	Newcastle upon Tyne	United Kingdom	For Royal Navy.
21 May	Rook	Cuckoo-class schooner	Thomas Sutton	Ringmore	United Kingdom	For Royal Navy.
31 May	Vesuvius	Bomb ketch	Jacob Coffin	Newburyport, Massachusetts	United States	For United States Navy.
2 June	Boreas	Laurel-class post ship	Mr. Stone	Great Yarmouth	United Kingdom	For Royal Navy.
2 June	Griffon	Palinure-class brig	Jean-Baptiste Lemoyne-Sérigny and Pierre Rolland	Rochefort	France	For French Navy.
2 June	Laurel	Laurel-class post ship	Nicholas Bools & William Good	Bridport	United Kingdom	For Royal Navy.
8 June	Mercurius	Brig	Ernst Wilhelm Stibolt	Copenhagen	Denmark-Norway	For Dano-Norwegian Navy.
14 June	Liman	Bomb vessel	Toroshilov	Kherson	Russia	For Imperial Russian Navy.
17 June	Ajax	Téméraire-class ship of the line		Rochefort	France	For French Navy.
18 June	Landrail	Cuckoo-class schooner	Thomas Sutton	Ringmore	United Kingdom	For Royal Navy.
19 June	Widgeon	Cuckoo-class schooner	William Wheaton	Brixham	United Kingdom	For Royal Navy.
23 June	Kola	Kola-class sloop		Arkhangelsk	Russia	For Imperial Russian Navy.
23 June	Piram	Piram-class sloop	V. F. Budantsev	Lodeynoye Pole	Russia	For Imperial Russian Navy.
23 June	Solombal	Kola-class sloop		Arkhangelsk	Russia	For Imperial Russian Navy.
June	Delight	Seagull-class brig-sloop	Richard Thorne	Fremington	United Kingdom	For Royal Navy.
June	Emulous	Cruizer-class brig-sloop	William Rowe	Newcastle upon Tyne	United Kingdom	For Royal Navy.
1 July	Stad van Rotterdam	Man-of-war		Rotterdam	(Netherlands) Kingdom of Holland	For Royal Dutch Navy.
5 July	Vénus	Junon-class frigate		Havre de Grâce	France	For French Navy.
16 July	Columbine	Cruizer-class brig-sloop	Balthazar & Edward Adams	Buckler's Hard	United Kingdom	For Royal Navy.
17 July	Admiraal de Ruyter	Wreeker-class ship of the line	Peter Glavimans	Rotterdam	(Netherlands) Kingdom of Holland	For Royal Dutch Navy.
17 July	Goshawk	Fly-class brig-sloop	William Wallis	Blackwall	United Kingdom	For Royal Navy.
17 July	Mercure	Brig	Muzio & Mignone	Genoa	Kingdom of Italy	For French Navy.
19 July	Melpomena	Flora-class corvette	G. S. Isakov	Saint Petersburg	Russia	For Imperial Russian Navy.
19 July	Pomona	Flora-class corvette	G. S. Iskakov	Saint Petersburg	Russia	For Imperial Russian Navy.
19 July	Topaz	Cutter	A. I. Melikhov	Saint Petersburg	Russia	For Imperial Russian Navy.
19 July	Zhemchung	Cutter	A. I. Melikhov	Saint Petersburg	Russia	For Imperial Russian Navy.
30 July	Challenger	Fly-class brig-sloop	William Wallis	Blackwall	United Kingdom	For Royal Navy.
30 July	Favori	Oreste-class corvette	Jean François Guillemard	Antwerp	France	For French Navy.
1 August	Sealark	Cuckoo-class schooner	William Wheaton	Brixham	United Kingdom	For Royal Navy.
2 August	Prince George	West Indiaman	Peter Everett Mestaer	Rotherhithe	United Kingdom	For Frier & Co.
3 August	Forester	Cruizer-class brig-sloop	John King	Dover	United Kingdom	For Royal Navy.
8 August	Commerce de Paris	Commerce de Paris-class ship of the line	Jean-Baptiste Lefebvre	Toulon	France	For French Navy.
14 August	Earl Percy	Merchantman	Thomas Hearn	North Shields	United Kingdom	For private owner.
15 August	Caroline	Hortense-class frigate	Anne-Jean-Louis Leharivel-Durocher	Antwerp	France	For French Navy.
15 August	Italienne	Consolante-class frigate	Compagnie Étheart	Saint-Malo	France	For French Navy.
15 August	Mutine	Cruizer-class brig-sloop	Chapman	Bideford	United Kingdom	For Royal Navy.
16 August	Junon	Gloire-class frigate		Havre de Grâce	France	For French Navy.
16 August	Spartan	Lively-class frigate	Charles Ross	Rochester	United Kingdom	For Royal Navy.
19 August	Thais	Thais-class fireship	Benjamin Tanner	Dartmouth	United Kingdom	For Royal Navy.
28 August	Comus	Laurel-class post ship	Custance & Co.	Great Yarmouth	United Kingdom	For Royal Navy.
30 August	Hyacinth	Cormorant-class ship-sloop	John Preston	Great Yarmouth	United Kingdom	For Royal Navy.
30 August	Magnificent	Repulse-class ship of the line	Perry, Wells & Green	Blackwall	United Kingdom	For Royal Navy.
20 August	Redwing	Cruizer-class brig-sloop	Matthew Warren	Brightlingsea	United Kingdom	For Royal Navy.
30 August	Name unknown	Brig	Stevens	Broadstairs	United Kingdom	For private owner.
31 August	Recruit	Cruizer-class brig-sloop	Andrew Hills	Sandwich	United Kingdom	For Royal Navy.
1 September	Sabrina	Cormorant-class sloop	Robert Adams	Southampton	United Kingdom	For Royal Navy.
8 September	Var	Var-class en flûte		La Ciotat	France	For French Navy.
11 September	Philomel	Cruizer-class brig-sloop	William Rule, or Nicholas Bools & William Good	Bridport	United Kingdom	For Royal Navy.
12 September	Cygne	Abeille-class brig		Havre de Grâce	France	For French Navy.
13 September	Favorite	Cormorant-class ship-sloop	Jabez Bailey	Ipswich	United Kingdom	For Royal Navy.
13 September	Name unknown	West Indiaman	Brocklebank	Lancaster	United Kingdom	For private owner.
26 September	Anka-yı Bahri	Third rate		Bodrum	Ottoman Empire	For Ottoman Navy.
29 September	Britannia	East Indiaman	Perry & Wells	Blackwall	United Kingdom	For British East India Company.
29 September	Grasshopper	Cruizer-class brig-sloop	Richards Brothers & John Davidson	Hythe	United Kingdom	For Royal Navy.
29 September	Wanderer	Cormorant-class ship-sloop	James Betts	Mistleythorn	United Kingdom	For Royal Navy.
30 September	Ganges	Merchantman	Michael Smith	Calcutta	India	For private owner.
9 October	Opyt	Cutter	I. V. Kurepanov	Saint Petersburg	Russia	For Imperial Russian Navy.
11 October	Halifax	Merlin-class sloop	William Hughes	Halifax, Nova Scotia	(United Kingdom of Great Britain and Ireland) British North America	For Royal Navy.
11 October	Iris	Iris-class corvette		Dunkirk	France	For French Navy.
14 October	Cyane	Banterer-class post ship	John Bass	Topsham	United Kingdom	For Royal Navy.
14 October	Lightning	Thais-class ship-sloop	Obadiah Ayles	Topsham	United Kingdom	For Royal Navy.
16 October	Ringdove	Cruizer-class brig-sloop	Matthew Warren	Brightlingsea	United Kingdom	For Royal Navy.
20 October	Robuste	Bucentaure-class ship of the line	Jean-Baptiste Lefebvre	Toulon	France	For French Navy.
28 October	Pénélope	Armide-class frigate	Paul Filhon	Bordeaux	France	For French Navy.
29 October	Leeuw	Wreeker-class ship of the line	R. Dorman	Amsterdam	(Netherlands) Kingdom of Holland	For Royal Dutch Navy.
30 October	Liliia	Fifth rate	M. K. Surovtsov	Kherson	Russia	For Imperial Russian Navy.
10 November	Requin	Sylphe-class brig		Rochefort	France	For French Navy.
11 November	Flore	Armide-class frigate		Rochefort	France	For French Navy.
11 November	Sapphire	Cormorant-class ship-sloop	Thomas Brindley	King's Lynn	United Kingdom	For Royal Navy.
13 November	Alacrity	Cruizer-class brig-sloop	William Rowe	Newcastle upon Tyne	United Kingdom	For Royal Navy.
13 November	Betsey and Sophia	Brig	Mitchell	Cowes	United Kingdom	For private owner.
15 November	Surly	Cheerful-class cutter	Joseph Johnson	Dover	United Kingdom	For Royal Navy.
25 November	Meleager	Perseverance-class frigate	Robert Seppings	Chatham Dockyard	United Kingdom	For Royal Navy.
30 November	Foxhound	Cruizer-class brig-sloop	John King	Dover	United Kingdom	For Royal Navy.
November	Cheerful	Cheerful-class cutter	James & Joseph Johnson	Dover	United Kingdom	For Royal Navy.
9 December	Peacock	Cruizer-class brig-sloop	Jabez Bayley	Ipswich	United Kingdom	For Royal Navy.
10 December	Blossom	Cormorant-class ship-sloop	Robert Guillaume	Northam	United Kingdom	For Royal Navy.
25 December	Sappho	Cruizer-class brig-sloop	Jabez Bayley	Ipswich	United Kingdom	For Royal Navy.
24 December	Cossack	Banterer-class post ship	Simon Temple	South Shields	United Kingdom	For Royal Navy.
24 December	Raleigh	Cruizer-class brig-sloop	Francis Hurry	Howden	United Kingdom	For Royal Navy.
27 December	Cherub	Cormorant-class ship-sloop	John King	Dover	United Kingdom	For Royal Navy.
27 December	Herald	Cormorant-class ship-sloop	Carver & Cornely	Littlehampton	United Kingdom	For Royal Navy.
27 December	Procris	Cruizer-class brig-sloop	Custance & Stone	Great Yarmouth	United Kingdom	For Royal Navy.
Unknown date	Abram	Merchantman	John Brockbank	Lancaster	United Kingdom	For private owner.
Unknown date	Adonis	Adonis-class schooner		Bermuda	(United Kingdom of Great Britain and Ireland) Bermuda	For Royal Navy.
Unknown date	Alban	Adonis-class schooner		Bermuda	(United Kingdom of Great Britain and Ireland) Bermuda	For Royal Navy.
Unknown date	Alphea	Adonis-class schooner		Bermuda	(United Kingdom of Great Britain and Ireland) Bermuda	For Royal Navy.
Unknown date	Ann	Merchantman	John Brockbank	Lancaster	United Kingdom	For private owner.
Unknown date	Argo	Full-rigged ship		Chittagong	India	For Payne & Tyrce.
Unknown date	Aristotle	Schooner			United States	For private owner.
Unknown date	Bacchus	Adonis-class schooner		Bermuda	(United Kingdom of Great Britain and Ireland) Bermuda	For Royal Navy.
Unknown date	Barbara	Adonis-class schooner		Bermuda	(United Kingdom of Great Britain and Ireland) Bermuda	For Royal Navy.
Unknown date	Batavia	East Indiaman			Batavian Republic	For dutch East India Company.
Unknown date	Bermuda	Sloop-of-war	Robert Shedden	Bermuda	(United Kingdom of Great Britain and Ireland) Bermuda	For Royal Navy.
Unknown date	Bristol	West Indiaman	Mr. James	Bristol	United Kingdom	For Maxe & Co.
Unknown date	Cassandra	Adonis-class schooner		Bermuda	(United Kingdom of Great Britain and Ireland) Bermuda	For Royal Navy.
Unknown date	Clarkson	Merchantman		Hull	United Kingdom	For Mr. Clarkson.
Unknown date	Claudia	Adonis-class schooner		Bermuda	(United Kingdom of Great Britain and Ireland) Bermuda	For Royal Navy.
Unknown date	Daphne	Banterer-class post ship	Robert Davy	Topsham	United Kingdom	For Royal Navy.
Unknown date	De Leeuw	Third rate		Algiers	Ottoman Algeria	For Batavian Navy.
Unknown date	Diana	Sloop-of-war	V. F. Budantsev	Lodeynoye Pole	Russia	For Imperial Russian Navy.
Unknown date	Edinorog	Piram-class sloop		Lodeynoye Pole	Russia	For Imperial Russian Navy.
Unknown date	Elizabeth	Snow		Liverpool	United Kingdom	For John & Philip Hind.
Unknown date	Etna	Full-rigged ship			United States	For United States Navy.
Unknown date	Falmouth	Slave ship		Liverpool	United Kingdom	For Lett & Co.
Unknown date	Friends	Sloop	John Ball	Salcombe	United Kingdom	For Mr. Fagwell.
Unknown date	Gipsey	Privateer			United States	For private owner.
Unknown date	Glenmore	West Indiaman		Elgin	United Kingdom	For private owner.
Unknown date	Iastreb	Sobol-class sloop	V. F. Budantsev	Lodeynoye Pole	Russia	For Imperial Russian Navy.
Unknown date	Jason	Fourth rate			Batavian Republic	For Batavian Navy.
Unknown date	Ketty	Full-rigged ship		Dunkirk	France	For Batavian Navy.
Unknown date	Kingston	Slave ship		Liverpool	United Kingdom	For Litt & Co.
Unknown date	Koninklijke Hollander	Chatham-class ship of the line	Glavin	Rotterdam	(Netherlands) Kingdom of Holland	For Dutch Navy.
Unknown date	La Constance	Privateer		Saint-Malo	France	For private owner.
Unknown date	Laura	Adonis-class schooner		Bermuda	(United Kingdom of Great Britain and Ireland) Bermuda	For Royal Navy.
Unknown date	Lavinia	Merchantman	John & Philip Laing	Sunderland	United Kingdom	For Drummond & Co.
Unknown date	Écureuil	Palinure-class brig			France	For French Navy.
Unknown date	Cyclope	Palinure-class brig			France	For French Navy.
Unknown date	Le Glaneur	Privateer		Saint-Malo	France	For private owner.
Unknown date	Lizeta	Sloop-of-war	V. F. Budantsev	Lodeynoye Pole	Russia	For Imperial Russian Navy.
Unknown date	Loyal Sam	Merchantman		Bermuda	(United Kingdom of Great Britain and Ireland) Bermuda	For Mr. Wood.
Unknown date	Manchester Packet	Merchantman			United States	For private owner.
Unknown date	Mars	Merchantman	John & Philip Laing	Sunderland	United Kingdom	For Mr Hunter.
Unknown date	Mary Ann	Merchantman		Chester	United Kingdom	For Forbes & Co.
Unknown date	Mercury	Merchantman	Hudson & Bacon		United Kingdom	For private owner.
Unknown date	Mercury	Sloop		Bombay	India	For British East India Company.
Unknown date	Mikhail	Bomb vessel			Russia	For Imperial Russian Navy.
Unknown date	Nautilus	Brig		Bombay	India	For British East India Company.
Unknown date	Navigator	Cutter			Russia	For Imperial Russian Navy.
Unknown date	Olympia	Adonis-class schooner		Bermuda	(United Kingdom of Great Britain and Ireland) Bermuda	For Royal Navy.
Unknown date	Port d'Espagne	schooner		Port of Spain	(United Kingdom of Great Britain and Ireland) Trinidad	For Royal Navy.
Unknown date	Ranger	Cutter	John Avery	Dartmouth	United Kingdom	For Royal Navy.
Unknown date	Rose	Slave ship		Liverpool	United Kingdom	For Aspinall & Co.
Unknown date	Salamander	Coaster		Blyth, Northumberland	United Kingdom	For H. Debord.
Unknown date	Salcombe	Sloop	John Ball	Salcombe	United Kingdom	For private owner.
Unknown date	Severn	West Indiaman	Hilhouse	Bristol	United Kingdom	For private owner.
Unknown date	Sheldrake	Seagull-class brig-sloop	Richards Brothers	Hythe	United Kingdom	For Royal Navy.
Unknown date	Sobol	Sobol-class sloop	V. F. Budantsev	Lodeynoye Pole	Russia	For Imperial Russian Navy.
Unknown date	Svir	Sloop-of-war	V. F. Budantsev	Lodeynoye Pole	Russia	For Imperial Russian Navy.
Unknown date	Sylph	Schooner		Bombay	India	For Bombay Marine.
Unknown date	Sylvia	Adonis-class schooner		Bermuda	(United Kingdom of Great Britain and Ireland) Bermuda	For Royal Navy.
Unknown date	Thomas	Full-rigged ship	Nicholas Bools & William Good	Bridport	United Kingdom	For Roche & Co.
Unknown date	Tizha	Piram-class sloop	V. F. Budantsev	Lodeynoye Pole	Russia	For Imperial Russian Navy.
Unknown date	Triton	Brig		Sunderland	United Kingdom	For private owner.
Unknown date	Vesta	Adonis-class schooner		Bermuda	(United Kingdom of Great Britain and Ireland) Bermuda	For Royal Navy.
Unknown date	Victoria	East Indiaman			Batavian Republic	For Dutch East India Company.
Unknown date	Volkhov	Sloop-of-war	V. F. Budantsev	Lodeynoye Pole	Russia	For Imperial Russian Navy.
Unknown date	Wasp	Sloop-of-War	Josiah Fox	Washington Navy Yard	United States	For United States Navy.
Unknown date	Zenobia	Adonis-class schooner		Bermuda	(United Kingdom of Great Britain and Ireland) Bermuda	For Royal Navy.
Unknown date	Name unknown	Merchantman			Denmark-Norway	For private owner.
Unknown date	Name unknown	Merchantman		Flensburg	Denmark-Norway	For private owner.
