= Mary (ship) =

Numerous vessels have borne the name Mary:

- Mary (1793 ship), of 302 tons (bm), was built in India. She made one voyage to England for the British East India Company (EIC). Captain Thomas Stephenson sailed from Calcutta on 21 August 1795. She was at Madras on 28 September, reached Saint Helena on 18 January 1796, and arrived at the Downs on 18 September.
- Mary (1806 ship) was launched at Liverpool and made one voyage as a slave ship before the British slave trade ended, during which voyage she engaged in a notable friendly fire action with two British warships. She then traded with Haiti and Brazil, and possibly made one voyage to India. Next she then became a whaler and was lost in 1825 in the Pacific on the second of two whaling voyages.
- Mary (1811 Bideford ship) was a West Indiaman that made one voyage transporting convicts to New South Wales. She then returned to the West Indies trade, before trading with Quebec; she was last listed in 1835.
- Mary (1811 Ipswich ship) made one voyage for the British East India Company (EIC), to New South Wales (NSW), and Bengal. She continued to trade with Australia and then made five voyages transporting convicts there: two to New South Wales, two to Van Diemen's Land, and one in which she carried convicts to both. She was last listed in 1841.

== See also ==
- HMS Mary - one of 11 vessels by that name
