= List of shipwrecks in September 1822 =

The list of shipwrecks in September 1822 includes some ships sunk, foundered, grounded, or otherwise lost during September 1822.

== 1 September ==
List of shipwrecks: 1 September 1822
Ship	State	Description
Alice	United Kingdom	The ship ran aground on the Burbo Bank, in Liverpool Bay. She was on a voyage from Liverpool, Lancashire to Jamaica. Alice was refloated and resumed her voyage.
Manchester	United Kingdom	The ship ran aground on the Burbo Bank and was severely damaged. She was on a voyage from Liverpool to Philadelphia, Pennsylvania. Manchester was refloated and put back to Liverpool for repairs.

== 3 September ==
List of shipwrecks: 3 September 1822
Ship	State	Description
William	United Kingdom	The ship capsized at Quebec City, Lower Canada, British North America. She was later refloated.

== 6 September ==
List of shipwrecks: 6 September 1822
Ship	State	Description
Mary Ann	United Kingdom	The ship was wrecked near La Guayra, Venezuela. Her crew survived. She was on a voyage from Philadelphia, Pennsylvania to La Guayra.
Svyatoy Pavel (Святой Павел, 'St. Paul')	Imperial Russian Navy	The brigantine was driven ashore in the mouth of the ru:Bolshaya Garmanda and wrecked a week later. Her crew were rescued. She was on a voyage from Okhotsk to Gizhiga.
Timandra	United Kingdom	The ship sprang a leak and foundered in the Norwegian Sea 30 nautical miles (56 km) off Lofoten, Norway. Her sixteen crew survived. She was on a voyage from Arkhangelsk, Russia to London.

== 7 September ==
List of shipwrecks: 7 September 1822
Ship	State	Description
Sankt Croix	(Denmark) Danish West Indies	The ship was wrecked on Skagen, Denmark. She was on a voyage from Saint Croix, Virgin Islands to Copenhagen, Denmark.

== 8 September ==
List of shipwrecks: 8 September 1822
Ship	State	Description
Industry	United Kingdom	The schooner foundered in the North Sea off the Galloper Sand. Her crew were rescued. She was on a voyage from Newcastle upon Tyne, Northumberland to Exeter, Devon.

== 10 September ==
List of shipwrecks: 10 September 1822
Ship	State	Description
Simon Taylor	United Kingdom	The ship was lost at St. Andrews, New Brunswick, British North America. Her crew were rescued.

== 11 September ==
List of shipwrecks: 11 September 1822
Ship	State	Description
Fame	United Kingdom	The sloop was driven ashore in Loch Indaal. She was on a voyage from Ayr to Belfast, County Antrim.
Marchioness of Stafford	United Kingdom	The ship was driven ashore on the Isle of Skye. She was on a voyage from Skye to Leith, Lothian.
Mary Ann	United States	The brig was wrecked on the "Rocos". She was on a voyage from Philadelphia, Pennsylvania to La Guayra, Gran Colombia
Perth	United Kingdom	The ship sprang a leak in the North Sea and was abandoned by her crew, who were rescued by a collier.

== 12 September ==
List of shipwrecks: 12 September 1822
Ship	State	Description
Alexander	United Kingdom	The sloop was driven ashore and wrecked at Otterswick, Sanday, Orkney Islands.
Ann	United Kingdom	The ship was wrecked at Fraserburgh, Aberdeenshire. She was on a voyage from Peterhead, Aberdeenshire to Stettin.
Governor Griswold	United States	The ship was abandoned in the Atlantic Ocean. Her crew were rescued by Traveller (United Kingdom. Governor Griswold was on a voyage from Rotterdam, South Holland, Netherlands to New York.
Granite	United Kingdom	The ship was beached at Memel, Prussia. She was on a voyage from Aberdeen to Memel. Granite was later refloated and taken in to Memel for repairs.
Hardy's	United Kingdom	The ship was wrecked on South Uist, Orkney Islands with the loss of four of her crew. She was on a voyage from Belfast, County Antrim to Danzig.
Isabella	United Kingdom	The sloop was wrecked at Thurso, Caithness.
Nancy	United Kingdom	The sloop was driven ashore at Otterswick.
Robins	United Kingdom	The sloop was driven ashore at Otterswick.
St. Peter	Russia	The ship was driven ashore at Widewall, Orkney Islands. She was on a voyage from Saint Petersburg to Liverpool, Lancashire, United Kingdom. St. Peter was later refloated.
William	United Kingdom	The sloop was driven ashore and wrecked at Otterswick.

== 17 September ==
List of shipwrecks: 17 September 1822
Ship	State	Description
Mary	United Kingdom	The ship was wrecked at Maracaibo, Venezuela. Her crew survived, She was on a voyage from London to Maracaibo.
Regent	United Kingdom	The East Indiaman departed from Angier, Netherlands East Indies for China. No further trace, presumed foundered with the loss of all hands.

== 18 September ==
List of shipwrecks: 18 September 1822
Ship	State	Description
Selina	United Kingdom	The ship sank on the Arklow Banks, in the Irish Sea with the loss of five lives. She was on a voyage from Newport, Monmouthshire to Liverpool, Lancashire.

== 19 September ==
List of shipwrecks: 19 September 1822
Ship	State	Description
George Canning	United Kingdom	The ship took mail for England from HMS Cyrene (Royal Navy) in the Atlantic Ocean (14°35′N 19°55′W). No further trace, presumed foundered with the loss of all hands.
Martha Brae	United Kingdom	The ship was wrecked on Cape Sable Island, British North America.
Neptune	United Kingdom	The ship was lost on the Maplin Sand, in the North Sea off the coast of Essex. Her crew were rescued. She was on a voyage from Memel, Prussia to London.
Richard	United Kingdom	The ship collided in the English Channel with Harriet (United Kingdom) and was abandoned. Her crew were rescued by Harriet. Richard was on a voyage from Jersey, Channel Islands to Portsmouth, Hampshire. She was later boarded and taken in to Plymouth, Devon, where she arrived on 6 October.

== 21 September ==
List of shipwrecks: 21 September 1822
Ship	State	Description
Diana	United Kingdom	The ship was wrecked on the west coast of Morgan's Island, British North America. Her crew were rescued. She was on a voyage from Havre de Grâce, Seine-Inférieure, France to Miramichi Bay.
Swan	United Kingdom	The ship foundered in the Irish Sea off Cape Clear Island, County Cork. Her crew were rescued. She was on a voyage from Cardigan to Bideford, Devon.

== 23 September ==
List of shipwrecks: 23 September 1822
Ship	State	Description
Edward	United Kingdom	The ship was driven ashore and wrecked at Kirktown Head, Aberdeenshire. Her crew were rescued. She was on a voyage from Virginia, United States to Leith, Lothian.
Regret	United Kingdom	The ship was destroyed by fire at Batavia, Netherlands East Indies.

== 24 September ==
List of shipwrecks: 24 September 1822
Ship	State	Description
Acorn	United Kingdom	The ship was wrecked 4 leagues (12 nautical miles (22 km)) south of Figueira da Foz, Portugal. Her crew were rescued. She was on a voyage from Newcastle upon Tyne, Northumberland to Naples, Kingdom of the Two Sicilies.
Ganges	United Kingdom	The ship was wrecked near Arico, Tenerife, Canary Islands, Spain. Her crew were rescued. She was on a voyage from Newcastle-upon-Tyne, Northumberland to Lisbon, Portugal.
Maria Kristine	Denmark	The ship was lost on the Norwegian coast. She was on a voyage from Iceland to Copenhagen.
Ocean	United Kingdom	The ship was wrecked in Figueira Bay. She was on a voyage from Liverpool, Lancashire to Naples, Kingdom of the Two Sicilies.
Sesostris	United Kingdom	The ship ran ashore in the River Thames at Deptford, Kent, United Kingdom, while returning from Arkhangelsk. She was refloated that evening with little damage.

== 25 September ==
List of shipwrecks: 25 September 1822
Ship	State	Description
Margaret Ann	United States	The ship was driven ashore and wrecked at Mobile, Alabama. She was on a voyage from New York to Mobile.
Selina	United Kingdom	The ship was wrecked on the Arklow Bank, in the Irish Sea with the loss of five of the eight people on board. She was on a voyage from Newport, Monmouthshire to Liverpool, Lancashire.

== 26 September ==
List of shipwrecks: 26 September 1822
Ship	State	Description
Flora	United Kingdom	The ship was lost on the Sandhammer Reef. She was on a voyage from Memel, Prussia to Aberdeen.
Glenmore	United Kingdom	The ship was lost in the White Sea. Her crew survived. She was on a voyage from Onega, Russia to London.
Henry	United Kingdom	The ship was lost in the White Sea. Her crew survived. She was on a voyage from Onega to London.
Mary	United Kingdom	The ship was lost on the Sandhammer Reef. She was on a voyage from Memel to Great Yarmouth, Norfolk.
Richard	United Kingdom	The ship was run down and sunk in the English Channel by Harriet (United Kingdom. Her crew were rescued. She was on a voyage from Jersey, Channel Islands to Portsmouth, Hampshire.

== 27 September ==
List of shipwrecks: 27 September 1822
Ship	State	Description
Amelia	United States	The ship was driven ashore on James Island, South Carolina.
Ceres	United Kingdom	The ship was driven ashore at Charleston, South Carolina, United States.
Commodore Perry	United States	The ship was driven ashore at Charleston.
Hunter	Sweden	The ship was driven ashore at Charleston.
Pancheta	Spain	The brig was driven ashore at Charleston.
Rising Empire	United States	The ship was wrecked on the Ortoz Bank, off Buenos Aires, Argentina. Her crew were rescued. She was on a voyage from Buenos Aires to Havana, Cuba.
Rosalina	Spain	The schooner was driven ashore at Charleston.
Sea Gull	United States	The brig capsized and was driven ashore at Charleston.

== 29 September ==
List of shipwrecks: 29 September 1822
Ship	State	Description
Onslow	United Kingdom	The ship capsized at 17°N 54°W while sailing from St Andrews, New Brunswick to Demerara. She arrived at Barbados on 8 October, having lost her masts, deck load, etc.

== Unknown date ==
List of shipwrecks: Unknown date in September 1822
Ship	State	Description
Cæsar	United States	The schooner was wrecked at the mouth of the Pará River between 1 and 4 September.
Caledonia	United Kingdom	The ship foundered in the Bay of Biscay before 28 October. Her crew were rescued. She was on a voyage from Liverpool, Lancashireto Lisbon, Portugal.
Colombo	Netherlands	The ship foundered in the Indian Ocean with the loss of all but two of her crew.
Columbus	Netherlands	The full-rigged ship was abandoned off the Cape of Good Hope before 17 September.Julia (France) rescued the crew.
Cupido	Sweden	The ship was driven ashore on the south coast of Gotland. She was on a voyage from Stockholm to a Spanish port.
Freunde	Stolp	The ship departed from Harlingen, Friesland, Netherlands for London, United Kingdom. No further trace, presumed foundered in the North Sea with the loss of all hands.
Gratitude	United Kingdom	The ship was driven ashore at Point Atalya, in the River Plate before 16 September. She was on a voyage from Liverpool to Buenos Aires, Argentina. Gratitude was refloated on 19 September and put into Buenos Aires.
Mary	Gran Colombian Navy	The cruiser was wrecked in the Abaco Islands.
