= List of shipwrecks in October 1828 =

The list of shipwrecks in October 1828 includes all ships sunk, foundered, grounded, or otherwise lost during October 1828.

== 2 October ==
List of shipwrecks: 2 October 1828
| Ship | State | Description |
|---|---|---|
| Fenna | Stettin | The ship ran aground and was wrecked at Frederikshavn, Denmark. She was on a voyage from Stettin to Leith, Lothian, United Kingdom. |

== 3 October ==
List of shipwrecks: 3 October 1828
| Ship | State | Description |
|---|---|---|
| Aspern | United Kingdom | The ship was lost in the North Sea off the mouth of the Humber. Her crew rescued. She was on a voyage from Sunderland, County Durham to London. |
| Hibernia | United Kingdom | The ship was wrecked in Clonakilty Bay. She was on a voyage from Cork to Galway. |

== 5 October ==
List of shipwrecks: 5 October 1828
| Ship | State | Description |
|---|---|---|
| George | United Kingdom | The ship struck the pier at Whitehaven, Cumberland and was severely damaged. She was on a voyage from Newry, County Down to Southampton, Hampshire. |
| Okhtenka (Охтенка) | Imperial Russian Navy | The brig was driven ashore at Kadriorg, Reval, with the loss of 41 of her 58 crew. In addition, 4 rescuers died when their boat capsized. |
| Strela (Стрела, 'Arrow') | Imperial Russian Navy | The lugger was driven ashore at Anapa. Her crew were rescued. She was later refloated, repaired and returned to service. |

== 7 October ==
List of shipwrecks: 7 October 1828
| Ship | State | Description |
|---|---|---|
| Queen | United Kingdom | The ship was driven ashore and wrecked near Bideford, Devon with the loss of four of the seven people on board. She was on a voyage from Cork to Bristol, Gloucestershire. |

== 8 October ==
List of shipwrecks: 8 October 1828
| Ship | State | Description |
|---|---|---|
| Beaufort Castle | United Kingdom | The barque was wrecked in the Atlantic Ocean (29°30′N 30°00′W) with the loss of ten of her eighteen crew. The survivors were rescued on 12 August by La Cotonnier (France). She was on a voyage from Fernando Po to Liverpool, Lancashire. |

== 10 October ==
List of shipwrecks: 10 October 1828
| Ship | State | Description |
|---|---|---|
| Juno | United Kingdom | The brig foundered in the Bristol Channel off Burry Holms with the loss of both crew. |
| Marmion | United Kingdom | The ship struck the Arklow Banks, in the Irish Sea. She consequently foundered 15 nautical miles (28 km) off Bardsey Island, Caernarfonshire on 13 October. Her sixteen crew were rescued. Marmion was on a voyage from Liverpool, Lancashire to New Orleans, Louisiana, United States. |
| Sophia | Grand Duchy of Oldenburg | The ship was wrecked at Sylt, Kingdom of Hanover. Her crew were rescued. She was on a voyage from Kniphausersiel to Hull, Yorkshire, United Kingdom. |

== 13 October ==
List of shipwrecks: 13 October 1828
| Ship | State | Description |
|---|---|---|
| Atalanta | France | The ship was wrecked on the coast of Senegal. |

== 15 October ==
List of shipwrecks: 15 October 1828
| Ship | State | Description |
|---|---|---|
| Van Egmond | United Kingdom | The ship was driven ashore at Dragør, Denmark. She was on a voyage from Vyborg, Grand Duchy of Finland to Leith, Lothian. |

== 16 October ==
List of shipwrecks: 16 October 1828
| Ship | State | Description |
|---|---|---|
| Christence | Russia | The ship was driven ashore at Trondheim, Norway. |
| Endragtegheden | Norway | The ship was driven ashore at Trondheim. She was on a voyage from Trondheim to Genoa. |
| HMS Jasper | Royal Navy | The Cherokee-class brig-sloop was wrecked on Santa Maria, Kingdom of Sardinia. Her crew were rescued. |
| Shannon | United Kingdom | The ship was driven ashore at Trondheim. |

== 17 October ==
List of shipwrecks: 17 October 1828
| Ship | State | Description |
|---|---|---|
| Alliance | United Kingdom | The ship sank at Riga. Her crew were rescued. |
| Amphitrite | Sweden | The ship sank at Riga. |
| Amphitrite | Prussia | The ship was driven ashore at Pillau, where she was wrecked on 27 October. |
| Good Czar | United Kingdom | The ship was driven ashore at Bolderāja, Russia. |
| Intrepid | United Kingdom | The ship was lost near Reval, Russia. She was on a voyage from Saint Petersburg, Russia to Rouen, Seine-Inférieure, France. |
| Jane | United Kingdom | The ship sank at Riga with the loss of all hands. |
| Mayan | Netherlands | The ship was lost near Reval. |
| Park | United Kingdom | The ship was lost near Reval. She was on a voyage from London to Saint Petersburg. |
| Providence | United Kingdom | The ship was lost near Ventava, Courland Governorate with the loss of three of her crew. |
| Thomas & Mary | United Kingdom | The ship was driven ashore on Bornholm, Denmark. Her crew were rescued. She was on a voyage from Riga to Newcastle upon Tyne, Northumberland. |
| Weatherley | United Kingdom | The ship was wrecked near Swinemünde, Prussia with the loss of eleven of her crew. |

== 18 October ==
List of shipwrecks: 18 October 1828
| Ship | State | Description |
|---|---|---|
| Ann Gerdouta | Russia | The ship foundered at Reval. |
| Mars | United Kingdom | The ship was driven ashore and wrecked at Krasnaya Goya, Russia. Her crew were rescued She was on a voyage from Liverpool, Lancashire to Saint Petersburg, Russia. |
| Scipio | United Kingdom | The ship was driven ashore at Narva, Russia with the loss of two of her crew. |
| Sovereign | United Kingdom | The ship was driven ashore and wrecked at Krasnaya Goya, Russia. |

== 19 October ==
List of shipwrecks: 19 October 1828
| Ship | State | Description |
|---|---|---|
| Caledonia | United Kingdom | The ship was wrecked on Brier Island, Nova Scotia, British North America with the loss of six lives. |
| Susannah | United Kingdom | The ship was run down and sunk off Riga, Russia. Her crew were rescued. |

== 20 October ==
List of shipwrecks: 20 October 1828
| Ship | State | Description |
|---|---|---|
| Camperdown | United Kingdom | The ship was driven ashore and wrecked at "Cape Hack". Her sixteen crew were rescued. She was on a voyage from Hull, Yorkshire to Vyborg, Grand Duchy of Finland. |
| Ellen | United Kingdom | The ship was driven ashore at Danzig, Prussia. |
| Golconda | United Kingdom | The ship was wrecked on Green Island, Quebec City, Lower Canada, British North America. |
| Preston | United Kingdom | The ship was driven ashore and wrecked at Palanga, Russia with the loss of two of her crew. She was on a voyage from Vyborg to Hull. |
| Scipio | United Kingdom | The brig ran aground and sank at "Oudrina", Russia with the loss of two of her ten crew. She was on a voyage from London to Saint Petersburg, Russia. |

== 21 October ==
List of shipwrecks: 21 October 1828
| Ship | State | Description |
|---|---|---|
| Caldicot Castle | United Kingdom | Lloyd's List reported that the merchant ship had sunk at Milford Haven, Pembrokeshire, and had been raised and pulled up on Laurenny Beach. |

== 22 October ==
List of shipwrecks: 22 October 1828
| Ship | State | Description |
|---|---|---|
| Bolton | United Kingdom | The brig was wrecked at Burrow Head, Wigtownshire. Her crew were rescued. She was on a voyage from Belfast, County Antrim to Whitehaven, Cumberland. |
| Elizabeth | Sweden | The ship was driven ashore and wrecked on Vormsi, in the Baltic Sea. |
| Nevka (Невка) | Imperial Russian Navy | The transport ship ran aground on the Ryssgrundet Bank in the Gulf of Finland and sank. Her 17 crew made it to the nearest island, Täktarn (one of the sv:Yttre Täktarn, sv:Stora Täktarn, sv:Lilla Täktarn group), and from there to the Svartholm fortress. She was on a voyage from Kotka to Sveaborg, Grand Duchy of Finland. |
| Ocean | United Kingdom | The ship departed from Arkhangelsk, Russia for Antwerp, Netherlands. No further trace, presumed foundered with the loss of all hands. |

== 23 October ==
List of shipwrecks: 23 October 1828
| Ship | State | Description |
|---|---|---|
| Anna Maria | United Kingdom | The ship foundered off Porthleven, Cornwall. Her crew were rescued. She was on a voyage from Padstow to Truro, Cornwall. |

== 25 October ==
List of shipwrecks: 25 October 1828
| Ship | State | Description |
|---|---|---|
| Susannah | United Kingdom | The ship foundered off Strangford Lough. Her crew were rescued. She was on a voyage from Maryport, Cumberland to Dublin. |

== 26 October ==
List of shipwrecks: 26 October 1828
| Ship | State | Description |
|---|---|---|
| Nova Aurora | Portugal | The ship was wrecked in the Philippine Islands. |

== 27 October ==
List of shipwrecks: 27 October 1828
| Ship | State | Description |
|---|---|---|
| Zmeya (Змея, 'Serpent') | Imperial Russian Navy | Russo-Turkish War: The transport ship had sprung a severe leak and was preparing to beach at tr:Cape İğneada, Ottoman Empire, when she encountered the cutter Lastochka (Ласточка, 'Swallow', Imperial Russian Navy), which rescued her crew. Zmeya was scuttled to prevent capture by the Ottomans. |

== 28 October ==
List of shipwrecks: 28 October 1828
| Ship | State | Description |
|---|---|---|
| Marquis de Viana | Brazil | The ship was wrecked on Anegada, Bahamas. |

== 29 October ==
List of shipwrecks: 29 October 1828
| Ship | State | Description |
|---|---|---|
| Thomas | United Kingdom | The ship foundered off St. Ann's Head, Pembrokeshire. Her crew were rescued. She was on a voyage from Cardiff, Glamorgan to Newcastle upon Tyne, Northumberland. |

== 31 October ==
List of shipwrecks: 31 October 1828
| Ship | State | Description |
|---|---|---|
| Mary | United Kingdom | The ship ran aground on the Cross Sand, in the North Sea off the coast of Norfolk. She was refloated but consequently sank. Her crew were rescued. She was on a voyage from South Shields, County Durham to London. |
| Osbaldeston | United Kingdom | The ship was wrecked on Hiiumaa, Russia. |
| Sally and Ann | United Kingdom | The ship was driven ashore and wrecked in the Sound of Hoy. She was on a voyage from Wick, Caithness to Limerick. |

== Unknown date ==
List of shipwrecks: Unknown date in October 1828
| Ship | State | Description |
|---|---|---|
| Ardgour | United Kingdom | The ship was wrecked near Danzig, Prussia between 20 and 27 October. |
| Flying Fish | United Kingdom | The sloop was driven ashore at Mockbeggar, Cheshire. Her crew were rescued. |
| Harmony | United Kingdom | The ship ran aground on the Holm Sand. |
| Lord Collingwood | United Kingdom | The ship was abandoned in the Atlantic Ocean (40°47′N 50°42′W). Her crew were rescued by Eliza Grant (United States). She was on a voyage from Bristol, Gloucestershire to Quebec, British North America. |
| Perseverence | (United Kingdom of Great Britain and Ireland) New South Wales | The brig was the vessel which discovered the Campbell Islands, off southern New Zealand, in 1810. Eighteen years later she sailed from Sydney to the same chain on a sealing expedition, and was wrecked on the group's main island with the loss of two crew. |
| Samuel Barnett | United Kingdom | The ship was lost near Smolensk with the loss of all seven crew. She was on a voyage from Arkhangelsk, Russia to Hull, Yorkshire. |
| Shield | United Kingdom | The ship was wrecked near Danzig between 20 and 27 October. |
| Sunderland | United Kingdom | The ship was wrecked on the Gunfleet Sand, in the North Sea of the coast of Essex. Her crew were rescued. |
| Triton | United Kingdom | The ship was holed by her anchor and sank at Buenos Aires, Argentina. before 23 October, |
| Waterloo | United Kingdom | The brig was wrecked at Pillau, Prussia before 25 October with the loss of twelve of her fourteen crew. |
