= Manchester Packet (ship) =

At least two vessels in the early 19th century were known as the Manchester packet or Manchester Packet:

- Manchester (1805 ship) was originally built at Falmouth and served the Post Office Packet Service. Hence, she was generally referred to as a packet ship, and often as a Falmouth packet or as Manchester Packet. In 1813 an American privateer captured her after a single-ship action, but the British Royal Navy recaptured her quickly. She returned to the packet trade until 1831 when she became a whaler, making one whaling voyage to the Seychelles. From 1835 she was a merchantman, trading between London and Mauritius. She was last listed in 1841.
- Manchester Packet (1806 ship) was built in New York. She immediately transferred to British registry and spent a number of years trading across the Atlantic. In 1814, she successfully repelled an attack by a U.S. privateer. In 1818 she returned to U.S. registry. She eventually became a whaler operating out of New London, Connecticut. In May 1828 she made the first of five whaling voyages; she was condemned in 1835 while on her sixth voyage.
