= Hannah Elizabeth =

Hannah Elizabeth may refer to:

- Hannah Elizabeth (ship)
- Hannah Elizabeth (TV personality)
