= HMS Pictou (1814) =

History

United States
- Name: Zebra
- Owner: Joseph A. & William Dunlap,
- Builder: Adam and Noah Brown, New York
- Commissioned: 8 December 1812
- Captured: 20 April 1813

United Kingdom
- Name: HMS Pictou
- Namesake: Pictou, Nova Scotia
- Acquired: April 1813, by capture
- Fate: Sold August 1818

General characteristics
- Tons burthen: 243, or 299 (bm)
- Length: 101 ft 5 in (30.9 m) (overall); 65 ft 6 1/2 in (20.0 m)
- Beam: 25 ft 7 1/8 in (7.8 m)
- Depth of hold: 10 ft 0 1/2 in (3.1 m)
- Armament: 10 × 12-pounder carronades; 6 × 6-pounder guns

HMS Pictou was the American letter of marque schooner Zebra that the Royal Navy captured in 1813. The Admiralty purchased her in 1814 and she served on the North America station during the War of 1812 before the navy sold her in 1818.

== Capture ==
On 20 April 1813 the British frigates Pyramus and Belle Poule captured Zebra off the west coast of France as Zebra was sailing from Bordeaux to New York. At the time the British frigate Andromache was in sight. Zebra carried ten guns and a crew of 38 men under the command of Captain L. Bourne.

== Career ==
On 15 June 1814, Lord Collingwood and HMS "Picton" sailed from Bermuda to Halifax, Nova Scotia, carrying black refugees that had come from the Chesapeake Bay area on British warships. (Note: The vessel was probably Pictou. Substituting Picton for Pictou was a common mistake but the Royal Navy did not use the name Picton until the 20th century. The mistake may have originated in the town of Pictou being relatively unknown, whilst Thomas Picton was a noted British general then serving in the Peninsular campaign.)

By 26 July 1814, Pictou appeared on a list of ships on the North American station, assigned to the Halifax to Nantucket sector.

In August, Pictou took part in an expedition up the Penobscot River in Maine. The first ships to go were Sylph, Dragon, Endymion, Bacchante, Peruvian, as well as some transports. Bulwark, Tenedos, Rifleman, and Pictou joined on the 31st. On the evening of 31 August, Sylph, Peruvian, and the transport Harmony, accompanied by a boat from Dragon, embarked marines, foot soldiers and a detachment from the Royal Artillery, to move up the Penobscot under the command of Captain Robert Barrie of Dragon. The objective was the American frigate Adams, of twenty-six 18-pounder guns, which had taken refuge some 27 miles up stream at Hampden, Maine. Here Adams had landed her guns and fortified a position on the bank with fifteen 18-pounders commanding the river. Moving up the river took two days, but eventually, after the Battle of Hampden, the British were able to capture the American defenders at Bangor, though not until after the Americans had burnt Adams. The British also captured 11 other ships and destroyed six. The British lost only one man killed, a sailor from Dragon, and had several soldiers wounded.

On 8 September, Bacchante, Rifleman, Tenedos, and Pictou captured the American schooner Fox at Machias, Maine. The British took the opportunity to confiscate a quantity of meat that they loaded on to Fox before they sent her to Saint John, New Brunswick.

On 20 January 1815, Rear Admiral Sir Henry Hotham sent Pictou to Britain with the dispatches announcing the capture of the USS President on 15 January. (Note: In the announcement in the London Gazette, Hotham is shown as giving Pictou's name as Picton.) Pictou's captain at the time was Lieutenant Charles Hare. (Note: Hare may have commanded her in 1814 as well after he left Bream in February 1814. The testimonials in his monograph are ambiguous.)

The navy reconditioned Pictou at Portsmouth between February and April 1815. Hare commissioned Pictou in June 1815. Lieutenant James Morgan replaced Hare in September 1815.

== Fate ==
The navy listed the schooner Picton, of 298 tons (bm), for sale at Plymouth on 11 June 1818. The navy sold Pictou on 13 August 1818 to a Mr. Hughes.
