= Orwell (1817 ship) =

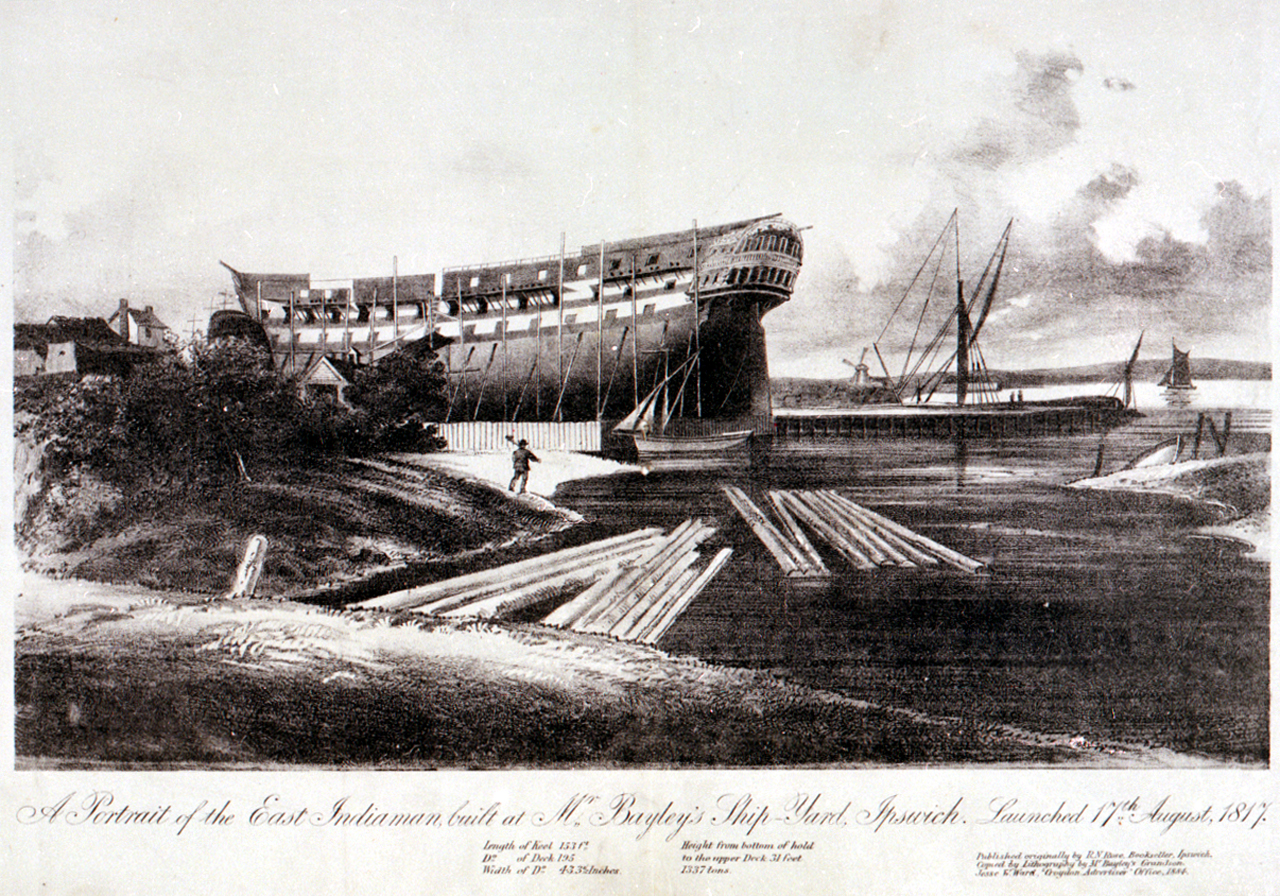
The Orwell under construction

The Orwell was an East Indiaman built by Jabez Bayley's Ship-Yard, Halifax, Ipswich. She was launched on 28 August, 1817 before a crowd of 20,000 on-lookers. The ship was built from Suffolk oak for Matthew Isacke of Greenwich. She took 15 months to build.
