= List of shipwrecks in November 1835 =

The list of shipwrecks in November 1835 includes ships sunk, foundered, wrecked, grounded or otherwise lost during November 1835.

== 1 November ==
List of shipwrecks: 1 November 1835
Ship	State	Description
Actæon	United Kingdom	The ship was driven ashore on Prince Edward Island, British North America. She was on a voyage from Bathurst, New Brunswick, British North America to Dundee, Forfarshire.
Alexey and Varna	Russia	The ship was driven ashore on "Wrangelle Island". She was on a voyage from Saint Petersburg to Reval.
Blackwater	United Kingdom	The ship was driven ashore on "Wrangelle Island". She was on a voyage from Saint Petersburg to London.
Indian Lass	United Kingdom	The ship was wrecked on the coast of Newfoundland, British North America. Her crew were rescued.
Venus	United Kingdom	The ship was wrecked on the coast of Newfoundland.

== 2 November ==
List of shipwrecks: 2 November 1835
Ship	State	Description
Agnes	United Kingdom	The ship was wrecked on "Amack Island". Her crew were rescued. She was on a voyage from Saint Petersburg, Russia to London.
Diligence	United Kingdom	The ship was driven ashore in Luce Bay. She was on a voyage from Cardiff, Glamorgan to Glasgow, Renfrewshire.
Industry	United Kingdom	The ship was wrecked on the Goa Sands, in the North Sea.

== 3 November ==
List of shipwrecks: 3 November 1835
Ship	State	Description
Ann	United Kingdom	The ship was driven ashore and wrecked on Folly Island, South Carolina United States. She was on a voyage from Greenock, Renfrewshire to Charleston, South Carolina.
Anna Maria	United Kingdom	The ship struck the Arklow Bank, in the Irish Sea and foundered. Her crew were rescued. She was on a voyage from Liverpool, Lancashire to Saint John, New Brunswick, British North America.
Boston Packet	United Kingdom	The ship was driven ashore and wrecked at Lowestoft, Suffolk.
Charlotte	United Kingdom	The sloop was wrecked at Tyrella, County Down with the loss of all hands.
Dale	United Kingdom	The brig struck a rock and was wrecked at Killough, County Down with the loss of all eleven people on board.
Henrietta	United Kingdom	The ship was in collision with another vessel off Skagen, Denmark and sank. Her crew were rescued.
Industry	United Kingdom	The sloop was wrecked on the Gaa Sands, off the mouth of the River Tay with the loss of one of her two crew. She was on a voyage from North Shields, County Durham to Dundee, Forfarshire.
Juno	United Kingdom	The ship struck a sandbank and foundered in the North Sea off Caister-on-Sea, Norfolk. Her crew were rescued.
Ouse	United Kingdom	The ship was driven ashore on Narva Island. She was on a voyage from Saint Petersburg, Russia to King's Lynn, Norfolk. Ouse was later refloated and taken in to port.
Prince Ferdinand	United Kingdom	The ship struck the Blackwater Bank, in Liverpool Bay and foundered. Her crew were rescued. She was on a voyage from Liverpool to Livorno, Grand Duchy of Tuscany.

== 4 November ==
List of shipwrecks: 4 November 1835
Ship	State	Description
Boston	United Kingdom	The ship was driven ashore and wrecked at Lowestoft, Suffolk.
Charlotte	United Kingdom	The sloop was wrecked at Tyrella, County Down with the loss of four of the six people on board.
Dale	United Kingdom	The ship was driven ashore and wrecked at Killough, County Down with the loss of all ten crew.
Hope	United Kingdom	The ship struck the Ridge Sand, in the North Sea off the coast of Norfolk and sank. Her crew were rescued.
Jean Laing	United Kingdom	The ship was wrecked in Longhope Bay, Orkney Islands with the loss of two of her crew. She was on a voyage from Narva, Russia to Liverpool.
Mary	United Kingdom	The ship was driven onto rocks and wrecked at Derbyhaven, Isle of Man. She was on a voyage from Liverpool to Westport, County Mayo.
Prince Frederick	United Kingdom	The steamship struck the Corton Sand, in the North Sea off the coast of Suffolk and sank with the loss of three lives. She was on a voyage from Hull, Yorkshire to London.
Robert and Ann	United Kingdom	The ship was abandoned in the Irish Sea off Holyhead, Anglesey. She was on a voyage from Cardiff, Glamorgan to Liverpool.

== 5 November ==
List of shipwrecks: 5 November 1835
Ship	State	Description
Bellona	United Kingdom	The barque was driven ashore at Newcastle, County Down. Her crew were rescued. She was on a voyage from Liverpool, Lancashire to Maranhão, Brazil.
Darling	United Kingdom	The ship struck the Blunock Roch and was consequently beached on Oyster Island, County Sligo. She was on a voyage from Cardiff, Glamorgan to Sligo.

== 6 November ==
List of shipwrecks: 6 November 1835
Ship	State	Description
Barbara	United Kingdom	The schooner was driven ashore at Eastbarns, Lothian. Her crew were rescued. She was on a voyage from Newport, Monmouthshire to Alloa, Clackmannanshire.
Benjamin Shaw	United Kingdom	The ship departed from Quebec City, Lower Canada, British North America for Aberystwyth, Cardiganshire. She was abandoned before 3 December.
Dutchman	United Kingdom	The ship was driven ashore at Scarborough, Yorkshire and severely damaged. She was refloated and taken in to Scarborough. Dutchman was on a voyage from Scarborough to Stockton on Tees, County Durham.
Emanuel	United Kingdom	The ship was driven ashore at Scarborough and severely damaged. She was refloated and taken in to Scarborough. Emanuel was on a voyage from Scarborough to Stockton on Tees.
Jabez	United Kingdom	The ship was wrecked at Cape St. Lawrence, Newfoundland, British North America with the loss of seven of her crew. She was on her maiden voyage from Prince Edward Island, British North America to Bideford, Devon.
Majestic	United Kingdom	The ship departed from Quebec City for Sunderland, County Durham. No further trace, presumed foundered with the loss of all hands.
Neptunus	Denmark	The ship was wrecked on a reef off Skagen. She was on a voyage from Málaga, Spain to Copenhagen.

== 7 November ==
List of shipwrecks: 7 November 1835
Ship	State	Description
Emily	United Kingdom	The ship was abandoned in the Atlantic Ocean. Her crew were rescued.
Isabella	United Kingdom	The ship was driven ashore and wrecked at Stonehaven, Aberdeenshire. Her crew were rescued. She was on a voyage from "Morisonhaven" to Arbroath, Forfarshire.
Titia	Danzig	The ship struck the Goodwin Sands, in the English Channel off the coast of Kent, United Kingdom. Her crew were rescued. She was refloated but consequently sank. Titia was on a voyage from Danzig to Guernsey, Channel Islands.

== 8 November ==
List of shipwrecks: 8 November 1835
Ship	State	Description
Emblem	Ottoman Empire	The ship was driven ashore at Odesa. Her crew were rescued.
George	United Kingdom	The ship was abandoned in the Gulf of Mexico. Her crew survived. She was on a voyage from Boston, Massachusetts, United States to Antigua.
Olinda	Portugal	The schooner was wrecked on Faial Island, Azores.
Robert	United Kingdom	The ship was lost on King William's Bank, off Ramsey, Isle of Man.
Ward	Belgium	The ship was driven ashore at Odesa. She was refloated on 15 November.

== 9 November ==
List of shipwrecks: 9 November 1835
Ship	State	Description
Bristol	United Kingdom	The ship was driven ashore and wrecked west of Hythe, Kent. She was on a voyage from Quebec City, Lower Canada, British North America to London.
Emily	United Kingdom	The ship was abandoned in the Atlantic Ocean. Her crew were rescued by Charlotte (United States).
Gleaner	United Kingdom	The ship was driven ashore and severely damaged in the Sound of Kyleakin. She was on a voyage from London to Sligo.
Harriet	United Kingdom	The schooner was wrecked near Burnham Overy Staithe, Norfolk with the loss of all eight of her crew. She was on a voyage from Saint Petersburg, Russia to Liverpool, Lancashire.
Helen	United Kingdom	The ship was wrecked on the Herd Sand, in the North Sea off the coast of County Durham. She was on a voyage from South Shields, County Durham to Shoreham-by-Sea, Sussex.
Mary Ann	France	The ship was sunk by ice at Kronstadt, Russia. She was on a voyage from Marseille, Bouches-du-Rhône to Saint Petersburg.
Stephen Gee	United Kingdom	The ship was driven ashore and wrecked at Orford, Suffolk. She was on a voyage from Stockton on Tees, County Durham to Rochester, Kent.

== 10 November ==
List of shipwrecks: 10 November 1835
Ship	State	Description
Alliance	France	The ship foundered in the English Channel 24 nautical miles (44 km) west north west of Dunkirk, Nord. Her crew were rescued by Nancy (United Kingdom).
Bristol	United Kingdom	The ship struck the Varne Bank, in the English Channel. She was consequently beached at Hythe, Kent, where she became a wreck. Bristol was on a voyage from Quebec City, Lower Canada, British North America to London.

== 11 November ==
List of shipwrecks: 11 November 1835
Ship	State	Description
Miss Douglas	United Kingdom	The ship was in collision with a steamship off Dublin and was consequently beached. She was refloated on 13 November and taken in to Dublin. Miss Douglas was on a voyage from Dublin to Liverpool, Lancashire.

== 12 November ==
List of shipwrecks: 12 November 1835
Ship	State	Description
Abeona	United States	The ship was lost on Scaterie Island, Nova Scotia, British North America. Her crew were rescued. She was on a voyage from New York to Saint John, New Brunswick, British North America.
Ceres	United Kingdom	The ship was wrecked on Little Manan Island, New Brunswick. Her crew were rescued. She was on a voyage from Quebec City, Lower Canada, British North America to Kirkcaldy, Fife.
Cumberland	United Kingdom	The ship was lost in the Saint Lawrence River. She was on a voyage from Quebec City to Liverpool, Lancashire.

== 14 November ==
List of shipwrecks: 14 November 1835
Ship	State	Description
Governor King	United States	The ship was wrecked in Mira Bay. Her crew were rescued. She was on a voyage from Bath, Maine to Sydney, Nova Scotia, British North America.
Union	United Kingdom	The ship was wrecked on Grand Manan Island, New Brunswick, British North America.

== 15 November ==
List of shipwrecks: 15 November 1835
Ship	State	Description
Carl Johan	Hamburg	The ship was driven ashore near "the Bosch". She was on a voyage from Antwerp, Belgium to Hamburg.
Countess of Elgin	United Kingdom	The ship was driven ashore and sank at Ostend, West Flanders, Belgium. She was on a voyage from London to Ostend

== 16 November ==
List of shipwrecks: 16 November 1835
Ship	State	Description
Vicissitude	United Kingdom	The ship was wrecked on the Shipwash Sand, in the North Sea off the coast of Suffolk. Her crew were rescued. She was on a voyage from Perth to London.

== 17 November ==
List of shipwrecks: 17 November 1835
Ship	State	Description
Calypso	France	The ship was driven ashore and wrecked at Calais. She was on a voyage from Stockholm, Sweden to Calais.
Huron	France	The ship was wrecked near Cape Finisterre, Spain. Her crew were rescued. She was on a voyage from Cette, Hérault to Havre de Grâce, Seine-Inférieure.
Protector	United Kingdom	The ship departed from the Restigouche River, New Brunswick, British North America for Londonderry. No further trace, presumed foundered with the loss of all hands.

== 18 November ==
List of shipwrecks: 18 November 1835
Ship	State	Description
Arbre a Pain	Hamburg	The ship was driven ashore at Altenbrück, Duchy of Schleswig. She was on a voyage from Hamburg to Maranhão, Brazil.
Busy	United Kingdom	The ship was driven ashore at Portsoy, Aberdeenshire.
Dolphin	United Kingdom	The ship was sighted in the Atlantic Ocean whilst on a voyage from Livorno, Grand Duchy of Tuscany to Newfoundland, British North America. No further trace, presumed foundered with the loss of all hands.
Industry	United Kingdom	The ship was driven ashore near Arbroath, Forfarshire. Her crew were rescued. She was on a voyage from Alloa, Clackmannanshire to Dundee, Forfarshire.
John Thomas	United Kingdom	The barque was abandoned in the Atlantic Ocean (43°45′N 46°00′W) with the loss of nine of her sixteen crew. Survivors were rescued by North America (United States). She was on a voyage from Quebec City, Lower Canada, British North America to Belfast, County Antrim
Majestic	United Kingdom	The ship was driven ashore and wrecked on "Strauma Island". She was on a voyage from Kronstadt, Russia to London.
Margaret	United Kingdom	The ship was driven ashore on "the Wrangles", near Reval, Russia.
Mariner	United Kingdom	The ship was driven ashore and wrecked at Aberdour, Fife. Her crew were rescued. She was on a voyage from Fraserburgh, Aberdeenshire to Cork.
Neptune	United Kingdom	The ship was driven ashore and wrecked near Aberdour. Her crew were rescued.
Robert	United Kingdom	The ship departed from Quebec City, Lower Canada, British North America for Lancaster, Lancashire. No further trace, presumed foundered with the loss of all hands.
Rochdale	United Kingdom	The ship was driven ashore on Kotlin Island, Russia. She was on a voyage from Hull, Yorkshire to Saint Petersburg, Russia. Rochdale was refloated on 23 November.
Stella	Kingdom of the Two Sicilies	The brig was driven ashore and wrecked on the north west coast of Islay, Inner Hebrides, United Kingdom. Her crew were rescued. She was on a voyage from Gergenti to the Clyde.

== 19 November ==
List of shipwrecks: 19 November 1835
Ship	State	Description
Deux Frères	Belgium	The ship was driven ashore at Vlissingen, Zeeland, Netherlands. She was on a voyage from Montevideo, Uruguay to Antwerp.
Ever	United Kingdom	The cutter was driven ashore on Borkum, Kingdom of Hanover.
Hannah Elizabeth	United States	The two-masted schooner ran aground in Pass Cavallo whilst being pursued by Montezuma (Mexican Navy). She was subsequently wrecked.
Jessie	United Kingdom	The ship departed from Newfoundland for Poole, Dorset. No further trace, presumed foundered with the loss of all hands.
John and Amelia	United Kingdom	The ship ran aground on the Dragoe Reef. She was refloated on 26 November and taken in to "Deephaven" for repairs. John and Amelia was on a voyage from Saint Petersburg, Russia to London.
Margaret and Emily	United Kingdom	The ship was abandoned in the Atlantic Ocean. Her crew were rescued. She was on a voyage from Quebec City, Lower Canada, British North America to Limerick.

== 20 November ==
List of shipwrecks: 20 November 1835
Ship	State	Description
Albion	United Kingdom	The ship was abandoned in the North Sea. Her crew were rescued. She was on a voyage from Leith, Lothian to Rotterdam, South Holland, Netherlands. Albion was taken in to Scarborough, Yorkshire on 2 December.
Aurore	France	The ship was wrecked on Jersey, Channel Islands.
Christopher Grey	United Kingdom	The ship was sighted on this date whilst on a voyage from Saint Petersburg, Russia to London. No further trace, presumed foundered with the loss of all hands.
Earl Talbot	United Kingdom	The ship foundered in the North Sea off Goree, South Holland, Netherlands. Her crew were rescued. She was on a voyage from Sunderland, County Durham to Rotterdam, South Holland.
Herman	Russia	The ship was driven ashore near "Winsduynen", Netherlands.
United Friends	United Kingdom	The ship foundered in the Irish Sea 20 miles (32 km) south west of the Calf of Man, Isle of Man. Her crew were rescued. She was on a voyage from Bristol, Gloucestershire to Glasgow, Renfrewshire.
Vine	United Kingdom	The ship was driven ashore at Ulverston, Lancashire with the loss of all hands. She was on a voyage from Liverpool, Lancashire to Glasgow.

== 21 November ==
List of shipwrecks: 21 November 1835
Ship	State	Description
Andrias	Stettin	The ship was driven ashore on Rügen, Prussia.
Aurora	United States	The ship departed from Bahia, Brazil for New York. No further trace, presumed foundered with the loss of all hands.
Britannia	United Kingdom	The ship ran aground and capsized at Bo'ness, Lothian.
Karen Marie Astine Margaretha	Stettin	The ship was driven ashore and wrecked in Grønsund, Denmark. Her crew were rescued. She was on a voyage from Stettin to Bridlington, Yorkshire, United Kingdom.
St. David	United Kingdom	The barque was wrecked at sea with the ultimate loss of six lives. Thirteen survivors were taken off the wreck on 30 November by the barque Christina (United Kingdom). St. David was on a voyage from Quebec City, Lower Canada, British North America to Plymouth, Devon.
Waterwitch	United Kingdom	The ship departed from Faial Island, Azores for London. No further trace, presumed foundered with the loss of all hands.

== 22 November ==
List of shipwrecks: 22 November 1835
Ship	State	Description
Hebron	United Kingdom	The brig was wrecked near Bonmahon, County Waterford with the loss of three of her crew. She was on a voyage from Dublin to Saint John, New Brunswick, British North America.
Helicon	United Kingdom	The ship was wrecked off Watling Island, Bahamas. Her crew were rescued. She was on a voyage from Jamaica to Halifax, Nova Scotia, British North America.
Nautilus	Bremen	The ship was driven ashore on Eierland, North Holland, Netherlands. Her crew were rescued. She was on a voyage from Bremen to London, United Kingdom. She was refloated on 21 April 1836 and taken in to "Raggeslot".
Pallas	United Kingdom	The ship was driven ashore at Redcar, Yorkshire. She was on a voyage from London to Whitby, Yorkshire.

== 23 November ==
List of shipwrecks: 23 November 1835
Ship	State	Description
Albion	United Kingdom	The brig was abandoned in the North Sea. Her crew were rescued by Ceres (Sweden). Albion was on a voyage from Rotterdam, South Holland, Netherlands to Leith, Lothian. She was subsequently taken in tow on 28 November by the brig London (United Kingdom), arriving at Scarborough, North Riding of Yorkshire on 5 December.
Carlisle	United Kingdom	The ship was driven ashore and wrecked in Parton Bay, near Whitehaven, Cumberland. She was on a voyage from Liverpool, Lancashire to Whitehaven.
D'Higginson	United Kingdom	The schooner was wrecked on the Quaco Ledges.
John	United Kingdom	The ship was driven ashore and wrecked at Vila Franca do Campo, Azores. Her crew were rescued.
Julius	United Kingdom	The ship was wrecked on Grand Manan Island, New Brunswick, British North America with the loss of a crew member. She was on a voyage from Saint John, New Brunswick to hull, Yorkshire.
San Antonio	Spain	The brig was wrecked on a sandbank off the coast of Norway with the loss of eight of her fifteen crew. Survivors were rescued by the brig Celphini (Sweden. San Antonio was on a voyage from Stockholm, Sweden to Lisbon, Portugal.
Santa Anna	Portugal	The yacht was driven ashore and wrecked on São Miguel Island, Azores. Her crew were rescued.

== 24 November ==
List of shipwrecks: 24 November 1835
Ship	State	Description
Catherine	United Kingdom	The ship was driven ashore at White Point, County Cork.
Collins	United Kingdom	The ship was driven ashore and wrecked near Dunmore East, County Waterford. Her crew were rescued. She was on a voyage from Quebec City, Lower Canada, British North America to Liverpool, Lancashire.
John	United Kingdom	The ship was driven ashore at Swansea, Glamorgan. She was on a voyage from Cardiff to Swansea.
John and Mary	United Kingdom	The ship capsized at Penzance, Cornwall.
Mysom Giram	(flag) United States	The ship was wrecked on the Chincoteague Shoals. She was on a voyage from Halifax Regional Municipality, Nova Scotia, British North America to Philadelphia, Pennsylvania.
Prunella	United Kingdom	The ship driven ashore and wrecked at Black Rock, Wexford with the loss of all but one of her crew. She was on a voyage from Cardiff, Glamorgan to Liverpool.
Severn	United Kingdom	The ship was driven ashore and wrecked near Dunmore East. Her crew were rescued. She was on a voyage from Miramichi, New Brunswick, British North America to Bristol, Gloucestershire.
Sylla	United Kingdom	The ship was driven ashore at Drogheda, County Louth. She was on a voyage from Liverpool to Trieste. She was refloated on 2 December and taken in to Drogheda.
Triton	United Kingdom	The brig was driven onto rocks at Penzance. She was on a voyage from Quebec City, Lower Canada, British North America to Shoreham-by-Sea, Sussex.
Tryagain	United Kingdom	The ship was driven ashore at Kinsale, County Cork with the loss of a passenger. She was on a voyage from Quebec City to Cork.

== 25 November ==
List of shipwrecks: 25 November 1835
Ship	State	Description
Anna	United Kingdom	The schooner was driven ashore and wrecked at Egleston's Point, County Louth. Her seven crew were rescued.
Audry	(United Kingdom of Great Britain and Ireland) Jersey	The ship was wrecked on the Saltee Islands, County Wexford. Her crew were rescued. She was on a voyage from Jersey to Liverpool, Lancashire.
Countess of Glasgow	United Kingdom	The paddle steamer was wrecked at Woodside, Glasgow, Renfrewshire.
Cuba	United Kingdom	The ship was driven ashore and wreck near Dunmore East, County Waterford. Her crew were rescued. She was on a voyage from Alexandria, Egypt to Milford Haven, Pembrokeshire. Cuba was refloated on 8 January 1836.
Eclipse	United Kingdom	The ship sprang a leak and was beached at Saltfleet, Lincolnshire. She was on a voyage from Wells-next-the-Sea, Norfolk to Goole, Yorkshire.
Greyhound	United Kingdom	The ship sprang a leak and foundered in the English Channel off Falmouth, Cornwall. Her crew were rescued. She was on a voyage from Milford Haven, Pembrokeshire to Plymouth, Devon.
Ino	United Kingdom	The ship was driven ashore at Swansea, Glamorgan. She was on a voyage from Cardiff to Swansea.
John Miller	United Kingdom	The ship was abandoned off Flores Island, Azores. Her crew were rescued by Scotia (United Kingdom). John Miller was on a voyage from Liverpool to Savannah, Georgia, United States.
Les Deux Sœurs	France	The ship was wrecked in Tramore Bay, Ireland. Her crew were rescued. She was on a voyage from Nice, Alpes Maritimes to Rouen, Seine-Inférieure.
Pauline and Emma	United Kingdom	The brig, master Erdtmann, was wrecked on the island of Tuirensaari, Björkö. She was on a voyage from Lübeck to Saint Petersburg, Russia.

== 26 November ==
List of shipwrecks: 26 November 1835
Ship	State	Description
Albion	United Kingdom	The ship was wrecked on the Cangashore Rocks, off the coast of County Galway with the loss of all hands. She was on a voyage from Limerick to Liverpool, Lancashire.
Alexander	United Kingdom	The ship was abandoned in the Atlantic Ocean. Her three surviving crew were rescued by Lunenburg (United Kingdom), ten having died between 23 and 26 November. Alexander was on a voyage from Quebec City, Lower Canada, British North America to Amlwch, Anglesey.
Ann and Elizabeth	United Kingdom	The ship was wrecked at Youghal, County Cork.
Concord	United Kingdom	The ship departed from Workington, Cumberland for an Irish port. No further trace, presumed foundered with the loss of all hands.
Cordelia	United Kingdom	The brig was wrecked at Slade, County Waterford with the loss of three lives. She was on a voyage from a Spanish port to Cardiff, Glamorgan.
Jane	United Kingdom	The ship was lost at "Marigoanish".
La Patriote	France	The ship foundered in the Irish Sea off Portally, County Waterford with the loss of all hands.
Leopard	United Kingdom	The ship departed from Workington for an Irish port. No further trace, presumed foundered with the loss of all hands.
Sherbrook	United Kingdom	The ship was driven ashore in Mobile Bay.
Shubenacadie	(United Kingdom of Great Britain and Ireland) British North America	The brig was driven ashore at Wexford, United Kingdom.
Thomas	United Kingdom	The ship was driven ashore at Crookhaven, County Cork. She was on a voyage from Saint John, New Brunswick, British North America to Liverpool.

== 27 November ==
List of shipwrecks: 27 November 1835
Ship	State	Description
Arthur	United Kingdom	The ship was driven ashore in the Saltee Islands, County Wexford with the loss of threeof her crew. She was on a voyage from Alicante, Spain to London.
Brothers	United Kingdom	The ship was driven ashore on "Odinsholen". She was on a voyage from London to Saint Petersburg, Russia. Brothers was wrecked on 5 December.
Elizabeth	United Kingdom	The ship foundered near Milford Haven, Pembrokeshire. with the loss of her captain.
Liberté du Commerce	France	The ship was driven ashore and sank at Villanova, Spain. She was on a voyage from Nantes, Basses-Pyrénées to Marseille, Bouches-du-Rhône.
Sposa Amorosa	Malta	The bombard was wrecked at Sainte-Maire, France. Her crew were rescued. She was on a voyage from Malta to Marseille, Bouches-du-Rhône, France.
HMS Star	Royal Navy	The brig was severely damaged in the Atlantic Ocean (42°44′N 36°04′W) during a gale.
William and Mary	United Kingdom	The ship was driven ashore at Dale, Pembrokeshire.

== 28 November ==
List of shipwrecks: 28 November 1835
Ship	State	Description
Fidelity	United Kingdom	The sloop was wrecked on the Great Mew Stone. All on board were rescued. She was on a voyage from Teignmouth to Dartmouth, Devon.
Sainte Lucie et Cléophile	France	The ship was wrecked at Gibraltar. Her crew were rescued. She was on a voyage from Marseille, Bouches-du-Rhône to Havre de Grâce, Seine-Inférieure.

== 29 November ==
List of shipwrecks: 29 November 1835
Ship	State	Description
Civilian	United Kingdom	The ship was abandoned in the Atlantic Ocean. Her crew were rescued by Priam (United Kingdom).
Peace	United Kingdom	The brig was wrecked on the Shipwash Sand, in the North Sea off the coast of Suffolk. Her crew were rescued.

== 30 November ==
List of shipwrecks: 30 November 1835
Ship	State	Description
Cadmus	United Kingdom	The ship was wrecked on Cape Breton Island, Nova Scotia, British North America. She was on a voyage from Quebec City, Lower Canada to Poole, Dorset, or Prince Edward Island to Haiti.
Confidence	United Kingdom	The ship was driven ashore at Baltimore, County Cork. She was on a voyage from Quebec City, Lower Canada, British North America to Baltimore.
Edgar	United Kingdom	The ship capsized in the Atlantic Ocean (44°30′N 43°20′W) with the loss of all but four of her crew. Survivors were rescued on 30 November by Tiber (United States). Edgr was on a voyage from Quebec City to Liverpool, Lancashire.
Fairy Queen	United Kingdom	The sloop foundered off Tobago with the loss of two of her crew.
Hibernia	United Kingdom	The ship was driven ashore at Baltimore. She was on a voyage from Quebec City to Bantry, County Cork.
Harmony	United Kingdom	The ship was abandoned in the Atlantic Ocean (42°03′N 34°15′W). Her thirteen crew were rescued by Constitution (United Kingdom).
Marmount	United Kingdom	The ship was driven ashore at Fraserburgh, Aberdeenshire.

== Unknown date ==
List of shipwrecks: Unknown date 1835
Ship	State	Description
Ann	United Kingdom	The ship was wrecked in Trinity Bay before 24 November. She was on a voyage from London to Memel, Prussia.
Aurora	United Kingdom	The ship was wrecked on the Gunfleet sand, in the North Sea off the coast of Suffolk before 27 November.
Bacchus	United Kingdom	The ship was driven ashore between Clonakilty and Roscarberry, County Cork. She was on a voyage from Bathurst to Bideford, Devon.
Bolina	United Kingdom	The ship was driven ashore in Dundrum Bay. She was on a voyage from Liverpool to Maranhão, Brazil. Bolina was refloated on 15 April 1836 and taken in to Newcastle, County Down.
Caledonia	United Kingdom	The ship was driven ashore and severely damaged on Lindisfarne, Northumberland before 3 November.
Carlisle	United Kingdom	The ship was wrecked in Parton Bay before 25 November. She was on a voyage from Liverpool, Lancashire to Whitehaven, Cumberland.
Catherine and Jane	United Kingdom	The ship foundered in the Bristol Channel off Milford Haven, Pembrokeshire before 23 November.
Clara	United Kingdom	The ship foundered in the North Sea off Southwold, Suffolk before 6 November.
Eliza or Elizabeth	(United Kingdom of Great Britain and Ireland) Jersey	The brig was wrecked on "Persee Island". Her crew were rescued. She was on a voyage from Gaspé, Lower Canada, British North America to Jersey.
Etoile	France	The ship was wrecked on the coast of Cuba with the loss of all but two of her crew. The survivors were rescued by Friedland (Belgium).
Helen	United Kingdom	The ship was wrecked on the Herd Sand, in the North Sea off the coast of County Durham before 16 November.
Helen	United Kingdom	The ship was wrecked on the Cardagos. Her crew were rescued. She was on a voyage from Mauritius to Calcutta, India.
Henry Cox	United Kingdom	The ship was driven ashore and wrecked at Great Yarmouth, Norfolk before 4 November.
Hibernia	United Kingdom	The ship was driven ashore at Ballina, County Mayo before 30 November.
Jacobus	Netherlands	The ship foundered in the Grand Banks of Newfoundland.
Jason	(United Kingdom of Great Britain and Ireland) Dominica	The schooner was wrecked in the Atlantic Ocean in mid-November with the loss of four of her seven crew. The survivors were rescued three days later by the brig Emerald (United Kingdom). Jason was on a voyage from Halifax, Nova Scotia, British North America to Dominica.
Manilla	United States	The ship was wrecked on Anegada a Fuera. All on board were rescued. She was on a voyage from New Orleans, Louisiana to Veracruz, Mexico.
Mary Ann	United Kingdom	The ship foundered in the North Sea off Southwold before 5 November.
Merlin	United Kingdom	The ship was driven ashore and wrecked on Green Island, British North America. She was on a voyage from Quebec City, Lower Canada to London.
Messenger	United Kingdom	The ship was driven ashore at Cuxhaven before 30 November.
Middleton	United Kingdom	The whaler was wrecked in the Davis Strait on 5 or 14 November. Her crew were rescued by Jane and Viewforth (both United Kingdom).
Peace	United Kingdom	The ship was wrecked in Spey Bay before 11 November. Her crew survived.
Perseverance	United Kingdom	The ship foundered in the Irish Sea off Carlingford, County Louth before 8 November.
Providence	United Kingdom	The ship foundered in Galway Bay She was on a voyage from Galway to Liverpool.
Robert	United Kingdom	The ship foundered in the Irish Sea off the Isle of Man with the loss of all ten of her crew.
Robert Boyle	United Kingdom	The ship was driven ashore near Drogheda, County Louth. Her crew were rescued. She was on a voyage from Liverpool to Dublin.
Rudolf	Russia	The ship was wrecked near Reval before 11 November. She was on a voyage from Reval to Saint Petersburg.
Sarah	United Kingdom	The ship was wrecked near La Rochelle, Charente-Maritime, France. Her crew were rescued. She was on a voyage from the Charente to Bristol, Gloucestershire.
Scylla	United Kingdom	The ship was driven ashore at Drogheda, County Louth before 28 November.
Sisters	United Kingdom	The ship departed from Wells-next-the-Sea in early November for Newcastle upon Tyne, Northumberland. Presumed to be the vessel that foundered in the North Sea off Dimlington, East Riding of Yorkshire.
Tertius	United Kingdom	The ship was wrecked at the mouth of the Eider before 28 November. She was on a voyage from Hull, Yorkshire to Hamburg.
Thomas Bennett	United Kingdom	The ship foundered in the North Sea off Southwold before 9 November.
Urania	(United Kingdom of Great Britain and Ireland) British North America	The ship was wrecked on Cape Breton Island, Nova Scotia. She was on a voyage from Quebec City, Lower Canada to Halifax, Nova Scotia.
Vergos	United States	The ship was wrecked near Messina, Sicily before 26 November. Her crew were rescued.
