= HMS Olympia (1806) =

History

United Kingdom
- Name: HMS Olympia
- Ordered: 2 April 1804
- Builder: Bermuda
- Launched: early 1806
- Commissioned: March 1806
- Captured: March 1811

France
- Name: Olympia
- Acquired: March 1811 by capture
- Captured: 29 October 1811

United Kingdom
- Name: HMS Olympia
- Acquired: 29 October 1811, by capture
- Fate: Sold for breaking up 1815.

General characteristics
- Tons burthen: 11093/94 bm
- Length: 68 ft 2 in (20.8 m) (gundeck); 50 ft 5 5/8 in (15.4 m) (keel)
- Beam: 20 ft 4 in (6.2 m)
- Depth of hold: 10 ft 3 in (3.12 m)
- Sail plan: Full-rigged ship
- Complement: 35
- Armament: 8 × 18-pounder carronades + 2 × 6-pounder guns

HMS Olympia was an Adonis-class schooner of the Royal Navy during the Napoleonic War. She was built at Bermuda using Bermudan cedar and completed in 1806. In March 1811 the French captured her, but the British recaptured her in October. During her career, she served as far afield as Buenos Aires, Île Bourbon, and Cape of Good Hope. The Admiralty sold her in 1815.

== Career ==
Olympia was commissioned in March 1806 under the command of Lieutenant Henry Taylor. In December Lieutenant John Paget took command. On 1 January 1807 she sailed for the Cape of Good Hope.

By June Olympia was with the squadron under Admiral George Murray involved in the operations to capture Buenos Aires, supporting General John Whitelocke's soldiers. Murray and the naval forces were for the most part limited to conveying troops, and subsequently organising their evacuation. By July Paget had been invalided home and Taylor had replaced him.

Admiral Murray appointed Lieutenant Henry Collins Deacon as acting lieutenant of Olympia around July and the Admiralty confirmed the appointment on 28 February 1808. Prior to his appointment, Deacon had assisted at the capture of a French letter of marque, and escorted her to the Cape of Good Hope. On the way Olympia encountered 42 continuous days of gales, with the result that the crew was at the pumps for the whole time and the prize crew's water ration was reduced to a half-pint per man per day.

In 1808 Olympia recaptured the brig Seaflower. After 18 months Deacon was transferred. At some point Taylor returned to command of Olympia. Then in April 1810 Olympia destroyed three armed vessels.

In 1810 she participated in the operations against the Île Bourbon. From there she sailed back to Britain with the officers carrying the despatches announcing the capture of the island, and also Captain Matthew Flinders, who the British had just freed from his captivity in Mauritius. Flinders later described Olympia as "an indifferent sailing vessel, very leaky, and excessively ill-found".

On 4 August, on her way home, Olympia captured the French brig Atalante. She was pierced for 18 guns but had only two mounted, and was sailing from Île de France to Bordeaux with a valuable cargo.

== Capture, recapture, and subsequent service ==
Olympia sailed from the Downs on 1 March 1811 to take station of Dieppe. That day she sighted five French luggers and sailed towards them, but they dispersed and ran inshore, with the result that she lost them. The next day Olympia sighted a lugger, gave chase, only to see several more emerge from the haze until there were 13 French vessels in all. Olympia strove to escape but by 2pm French vessels were close enough to open fire. Though she was able to repulse two attempts by the French to board, after an hour of action Olympia was forced to surrender as more French vessels arrived. She had had two men wounded, including Taylor Taylor would spend until late 1813 in captivity.

On 29 October 1811 Quebec was off the Flemish Banks when she captured the privateer Olympia, of ten 18-pounder guns and 78 men, after a long chase. The Royal Navy took Olympia back into service under her existing name.

On 13 February 1812, Lieutenant Walter Windeyer took command of Olympia.

On 1 August, Olympia shared with Raisonnable, Sussex, and Peacock in the detention of the American ship Forester. (Note: A second-class share of the prize money was worth £14 2s 10d; a sixth-class share, that of an ordinary seaman, was worth 16s 2¼d.)

On 2 March 1814, Olympia recaptured Union.

On 14 December 1814, Olympia was driven ashore at Spithead, Hampshire, England.

== Fate ==
Olympia was put up for sale at Portsmouth on 9 February 1815. She was sold on that day for £710.
