= Hardy's (1792 ship) =

British merchant ship 1792–1822

History

Great Britain
- Name: Hardy's
- Owner: J.Hardy
- Builder: Nicholson, Horn & Blenkinsop, South Shields
- Launched: 1792
- Fate: Wrecked 1822

General characteristics
- Tons burthen: 319, or 320, or 329 (bm)
- Armament: 1800: 4 × 4-pounder guns; 1809: 2 × 3-pounder guns; 1811: 4 × 4-pounder guns

Hardy's (or Hardys, or Hardie) was launched at South Shields in 1792. In 1796 she served as a transport in a British naval expedition to the West Indies. She suffered major maritime mishaps in 1807 and 1822. The mishap in 1822 resulted in her loss.

== Career ==
In 1795 Admiral Hugh Cloberry Christian mounted an expedition to the West Indies. The expedition sailed on 6 October, 16 November, and 9 December, but weather forced the vessels to put back. Hardy's was part of the fleet that returned in January 1796. The fleet finally successfully sailed on 20 March to invade St Lucia, with troops under Lieutenant-General Sir Ralph Abercromby. St Lucia surrendered to the British on 25 May.

The Register of Shipping (RS) started publishing with the 1800 issue. Hardy's first appearance in a register was in this issue. She had not and did not appear in Lloyd's Register for some time thereafter. The entry in the Register of Shipping reported that she had been launched in 1798.

Year	Master	Owner	Trade	Source
1800	J. Hardy	Captain	Newcastle–London	RS

In November 1807 Hardy's put into Harwich with the loss of her anchors and cables, and with nine feet of water in her hold. She was on a voyage from Arkhangelsk, Russia to London when she had grounded on the Corton Sand. A report later that month stated that she had sunk on the beach at Ramsgate, but that it was expected that her cargo would be saved.

Year	Master	Owner	Trade	Source
1809	J. Hardy	Captain	Shields–London	RS

The 1809 volume of the Register of Shipping showed Hardy's being launched in 1792.

Year	Master	Owner	Trade	Source & notes
1810	J. Hardy	Captain	Shields–London; Shields–Quebec	RS; damage and thorough repair 1808, & through repair 1810
1811	Foster	J.Hardy	Shields–Quebec	RS; damage and thorough repair 1808, & through repair 1810
1818	Hardy	Hardy	Shields–America	RS; damage and thorough repair 1808, & small repair 1810
1819	Hardy	Hardy	Shields–America	RS; thorough repair 1808, & small repair 1818
1820	Hardy	Hardy	Shields–Quebec	RS; thorough repair 1808, & small repair 1818
1821	Hardy	Hardy	London–Quebec; Shields–London	RS; thorough repair 1808, small repair 1818, & new sides and large repair 1821
1822	Hardy	Hardy	Shields–London	RS; new top sides and large repair 1821; "Refused to be Surveyed"

== Loss ==
On 1 April 1822 Hardys put into Portsmouth with the loss of her anchor and cables. She was on a voyage to Quebec. She arrived at Quebec on 17 May. On 29 July she arrived at Belfast from Quebec.

Hardy's, was wrecked on South Uist, Orkney Islands on 12 September with the loss of four of her crew. She was on a voyage from Belfast to Danzig.
