= Kingston (1806 Liverpool ship) =

History

United Kingdom
- Name: Kingston
- Owner: 1806:Litt & Co.; 1808:Burke & Co.
- Launched: 1812
- Fate: Reported lost at Barbuda 1810

General characteristics
- Tons burthen: 412 (bm)
- Sail plan: Ship
- Complement: 50
- Armament: 1806:16 × 9-pounder guns + 4 × 24-pounder carronades; 1810:4 × 9-pounder + 12 × 12-pounder guns + 4 × 24-pounder carronades

Kingston was launched in 1806 at Liverpool. She made one voyage as a slave ship. Thereafter she traded with the West Indies until she was lost in 1809.

== Career ==
Kingston appeared in Lloyd's Register in 1806 with Callaghan, master, Litt & Co., owner, built in Liverpool, and trade Liverpool—Africa.

On 18 August 1806 Captain Patrick Callan acquired a letter of marque. (Note: Patrick Callan was born in Ireland and entered the British West Indies and the slave trade from the Baltic trade.) He then sailed from Liverpool on 23 September 1806 on a slave trading voyage to the Bight of Biafra and Gulf of Guinea islands. He acquired his slaves at Bonny and on 28 April 1807 delivered 315 to Jamaica. Kingston sailed from Jamaica on 25 July and arrived back at Liverpool on 4 October. She had left with 57 crew members and suffered eight crew deaths on the voyage.

New owners then sailed Kingston as a West Indiaman.

Year	Master	Owner	Trade	Source
1807	Callaghan	Litt & Co.	Liverpool—Africa	Lloyd's Register
1808	Callaghan; Creighton	Litt & Co. Burke & Co.	Liverpool—Africa; London—Jamaica	Lloyd's Register
1809	Creighton	Burke & Co.	London—Jamaica	Lloyd's Register
1809	L. Bruton	Burke & Co.	London—Jamaica	Register of Shipping
1810	Bruton	Burke & Co.	London—St Croix	Lloyd's Register
1810	L. Bruton	Burke & Co.	London—Jamaica	Register of Shipping

== Fate ==
Lloyd's List reported on 2 March 1810 that Kingston, Bruxton, master, had been lost at Barbuda while sailing from St Croix to Liverpool. The Register of Shipping for 1810 has the notation "LOST" by her name.
