= Adonis-class schooner =

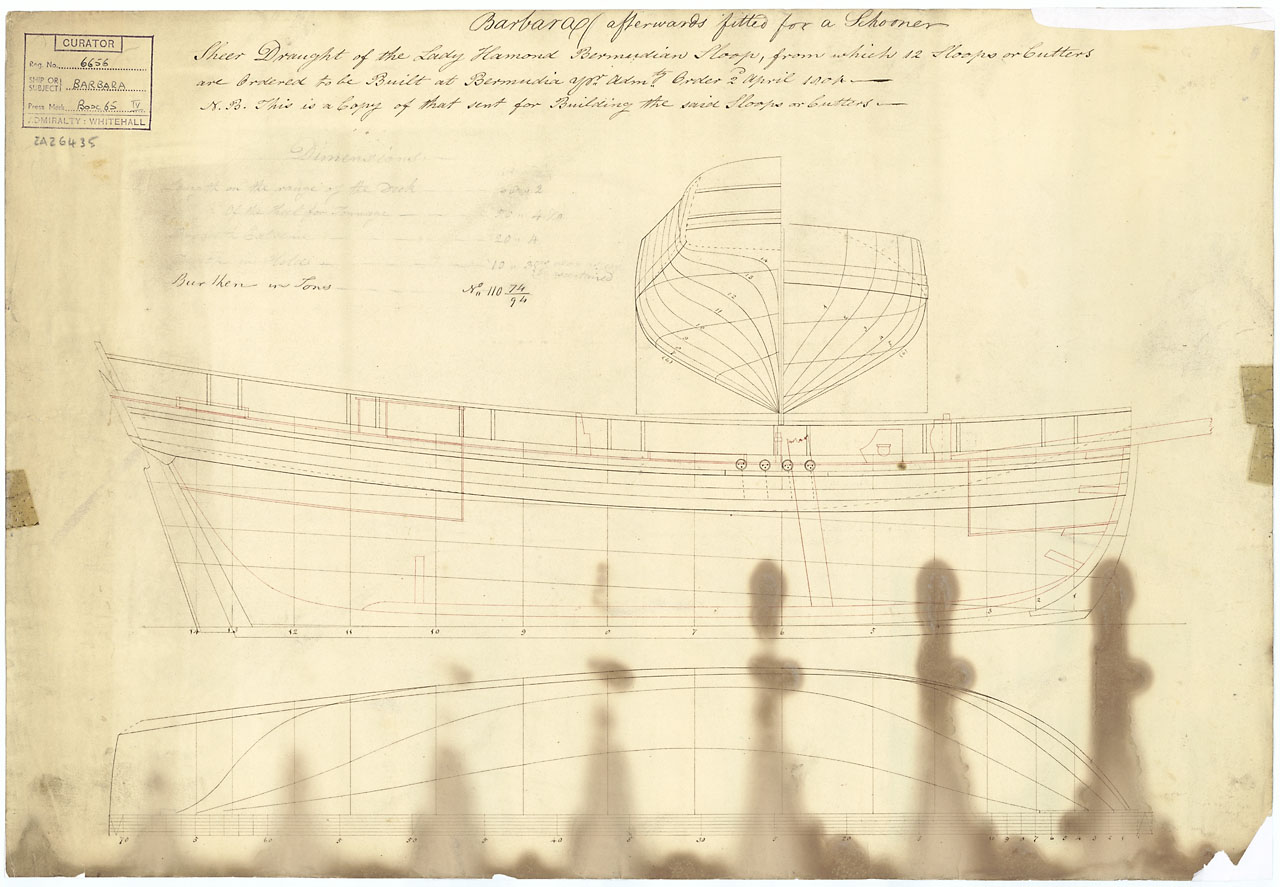
- Plan showing the body plan with half stern board ourtline, sheer lines with some inboard detail, and longitudinal half-breadth for Barbara

Class overview
- Name: Adonis class
- Operators: Royal Navy
- Preceded by: Ballahoo (or Fish) class
- Succeeded by: Cuckoo (or Bird) class
- Planned: 12
- Completed: 12
- Lost: 7

General characteristics
- Tons burthen: 110 93/94 (bm)
- Length: 68 ft 2 in (20.8 m) (gundeck); 50 ft 5 5/8 in (15.4 m) (keel)
- Beam: 20 ft 4 in (6.2 m)
- Depth of hold: 10 ft 3 in (3.1 m)
- Sail plan: Schooner
- Complement: 35
- Armament: 10 × 12-pounder carronades

The Adonis class was a Royal Navy class of twelve 10-gun schooners built under contract in Bermuda during the Napoleonic War. The class was an attempt by the Admiralty to harness the expertise of Bermudian shipbuilders who were renowned for their fast-sailing craft. The Admiralty ordered twelve vessels on 2 April 1804.

Winfield reports, based on Admiralty records, that although all twelve were ordered as cutters, all were completed as (or converted to) schooners. An article in the Bermuda Historical Quarterly reports that eight were built as cutters (Alban, Bacchus, Barbara, Casandra, Claudia, Laura, Olympia, and Sylvia), and three as schooners (Adonis, Alphea, and Vesta). The account does not mention Zenobia, but does mention that Laura and Barbara (at least) were re-rigged as schooners. The discrepancy lies in the poor communications between the Navy Board in Britain and the builders in Bermuda, as well as in deficiencies of record-keeping. Alterations in the masting and rigging of small (unrated) combatants were not infrequent at this time.

== Construction ==
The Navy Board ordered the vessels on 2 April 1804. Goodrich & Co acted as the main contractor to the Navy Board, and contracted out the actual building to different builders in different yards. In many cases the actual builder is unrecorded. All twelve vessels were apparently laid down in 1804 (but documentary evidence is lacking). Each vessel was launched and commissioned during 1806 (precise dates unrecorded).

The vessels were all constructed of Bermuda cedar. This durable, native wood, abundant in Bermuda, was strong and light, and did not need seasoning. Shipbuilders used it for framing as well as planking, which reduced vessel weight. It was also highly resistant to rot and marine borers, giving Bermudian vessels a potential lifespan of twenty years and more, even in the worm-infested waters of the Chesapeake and the Caribbean.

== Operational lives ==
Of the twelve vessels in the class, seven were wartime losses. Five survived to be sold between 1814 and 1816.

== Ships ==
Name	Builder	Launched	Fate
Adonis	Bermuda	1806	Sold 1 September 1814; became a mercantile vessel and was wrecked at the Maldives in June 1835
Alban	Bermuda	1806	Wrecked off Aldeburgh on 18 December 1812; all the crew drowned except 1 seaman and 1 woman.
Alphea	Bermuda	1806	Blew up in action with privateer off Start Point, Devon, on 10 September 1813; all crew lost.
Bacchus	Bermuda	1806	Captured by the French in August 1807
Barbara	Bermuda	1806	Sold 9 February 1815
Cassandra	Bermuda	1806	Capsized and sank off Bordeaux 13 August 1807 (11 men, plus a woman and child, drowned).
Claudia	Bermuda	1806	Wrecked off Kristiansand on 20 January 1809 (14 died).
Laura	Bermuda	1806	Taken by a French privateer off the Delaware River 9 September 1812. Recaptured in 1813, she did not return to Royal Navy service.
Olympia	Bermuda	1806	Sold on 9 February 1815.
Sylvia	Bermuda	1806	Sold at Plymouth on 30 May 1816. Became a merchantman that was wrecked in 1823.
Vesta	Bermuda	1806	Sold at Deptford on 11 January 1816. Became a merchantman sailing between Great Britain and Newfoundland until she sank in May 1823 after hitting an iceberg.
Zenobia	Bermuda	1806	Wrecked south of Cape Henry on 29 October 1806.
