= Jabez Bayley =

Jabez Bayley (or Jabez Bailey), (1771 -1834), was an English ship builder based in Ipswich, East Anglia.

== Family life ==
Jabez's first wife, Martha (nee Worts) died in 1812. He subsequently married Susan Darby in May 1813.

== Merchant ships built by Jabez Bayley ==
- Harleston (1811 ship)
- Mary (1811 Ipswich ship)
- Orwell (1817 ship)

== Naval vessels built by Jabez Bayley ==
- HMS Daring (1804)
- HMS Hearty (1805)
- HMS Imogen (1805)
- HMS Favourite (1806)
- HMS Julia (1806)
- HMS Peacock (1806)
- HMS Sappho (1806)
- HMS Nimrod (1812)
- HMS Esk (1813)
- HMS Fly (1813)
- HMS Leven (1813)
- HMS Dee (1814)
- HMS Diligence (1814)
