= HMS Claudia =

Adonis-class schooner of the Royal Navy during the Napoleonic War

History

United Kingdom
- Name: HMS Claudia
- Operator: Royal Navy
- Ordered: 2 April 1804
- Builder: Bermuda
- Launched: Early 1806
- Commissioned: March 1806
- Fate: Wrecked 20 January 1809

General characteristics
- Class & type: Adonis-class schooner
- Tons burthen: 11093/94 bm
- Length: 68 ft 2 in (20.8 m) (gundeck); 50 ft 5 5/8 in (15.4 m) (keel)
- Beam: 20 ft 4 in (6.2 m)
- Depth of hold: 10 ft 3 in (3.1 m)
- Sail plan: Schooner
- Complement: 35
- Armament: 10 × 18-pounder carronades

HMS Claudia was an Adonis-class schooner of the Royal Navy during the Napoleonic War. She was built at Bermuda using Bermudan cedar and completed in 1806. She was commissioned under Lieutenant Anthony Bliss William Lord in March 1806.

She moved to the Baltic station. On 26 August 1807 she detained the Danish bark Spes Feller. Four days later, on 30 August, she detained Resolution. Then on 4 September she captured Stockfisker, and on 29 April 1808 Neunderueiring.

Claudia was wrecked off Kristiansand (Norway) on 20 January 1809 as she was attempting to enter the Baltic. Driven close to shore by a storm, after the storm abated she struck a reef and sank before her crew could launch her boats. Although Lord swam through the freezing waters to get a line to Norwegian rescuers, 14 men died from drowning or exposure to the extreme cold.
