= HMS Zenobia (1806) =

History

United Kingdom
- Name: HMS Zenobia
- Ordered: 2 April 1804
- Launched: early 1806
- Commissioned: 1806
- Fate: Wrecked 30 October 1806

General characteristics
- Tons burthen: 11093/94 bm
- Length: 68 ft 2 in (20.8 m) (gundeck); 50 ft 5 5/8 in (15.4 m) (keel)
- Beam: 20 ft 4 in (6.2 m)
- Depth of hold: 10 ft 3 in (3.12 m)
- Sail plan: Schooner
- Complement: 35
- Armament: 10 × 18-pounder carronades

HMS Zenobia was a schooner of the Adonis class of the Royal Navy during the Napoleonic War. She was built and completed at Bermuda using Bermuda cedar in 1806 and commissioned under Lieutenant Archibald Hamilton. She sailed for Norfolk, Virginia, on 22 October 1806.

On 29 October 1806, she sighted the American coast and a pilot came aboard. The pilot mistook a fisherman's light on False Cape Henry for the light on Cape Henry and on the morning of 30 October 1806 she grounded 20 nautical miles (37 km; 23 mi) south of Cape Henry. Despite the assistance from the shore and several Royal Navy vessels, Hamilton could not refloat her. The desertion to the shore of 18 of her 24-man crew did not help. Hamilton and his remaining crew abandoned the wreck on 6 December 1806.

== Postscript ==
Zenobia's deserters helped provoke what became known as the Chesapeake-Leopard Affair. On 22 June 1807, the Royal Navy fourth rate HMS Leopard pursued, attacked, and boarded the United States Navy frigate USS Chesapeake looking for deserters from the Royal Navy, including those from Zenobia.
