= HMS Sylvia (1806) =

UK naval schooner (1806–1816) and merchantman (1816–1823)

History

United Kingdom
- Name: HMS Sylvia
- Ordered: 2 April 1804
- Builder: Bermuda
- Launched: 1806
- Commissioned: October 1806
- Honours and awards: Naval General Service Medal with clasp "Sylvia 26 April 1810"
- Fate: Sold 1816

United Kingdom
- Name: Sylvia
- Owner: 1816: Jewell & Co.; 1823:Williams & Co.
- Acquired: 1816 by purchase
- Fate: Wrecked late 1823

General characteristics
- Class & type: Adonis-class
- Tons burthen: 11093/94, or 138 bm
- Length: 68 ft 2 in (20.8 m) (gundeck); 50 ft 5 5/8 in (15.4 m) (keel)
- Beam: 20 ft 4 in (6.2 m)
- Depth of hold: 10 ft 3 in (3.12 m)
- Sail plan: Cutter
- Complement: 35
- Armament: 10 × 18-pounder carronades
- Notes: Built of Bermuda cedar, with a pine bottom.

HMS Sylvia was an Adonis-class schooner of the Royal Navy during the Napoleonic War. She was built in Bermuda using locally sourced Bermudan cedar and completed in 1806. She took part in one notable single-ship action in the East Indies in 1810. The Navy sold her in 1816 and she then became a merchantman. She was wrecked in 1823 on a voyage to West Africa.

== Career ==
Sylvia was commissioned in March 1806 under the command of Lieutenant Lewis Krumpholtz. In 1807, Lieutenant Augustus Vere Drury assumed command and sailed her to the Channel Station.

On 18 August, Sylvia captured the Danish vessel Generalindo Waltersloff. On 7 September, she participated in the Battle of Copenhagen. (Note: A petty officer's share of the July 1809 distribution of prize money was worth £12 11s; an able seaman's share was worth £1 8s.) From there Sylvia carried the British ambassador back to Britain.

Between 30 November 1807 and 6 March 1808 Sylvia was at Sheerness undergoing repairs. Drury then sailed on 7 May 1808 for the Cape of Good Hope.

Then on 8 April 1809 she sailed for the East Indies. In April 1810, Sylvia faced a series of challenges while passing through the Sunda Strait near Krakatoa, where she encountered three separate pirate proa attacks.

The first attack occurred on 6 April. Sylvia drove the proa ashore, removed its 6-pounder gun, and then destroyed the vessel. The proa had had a crew of some 50 men.

The second attack occurred the following day. Drury dispatched a boat, manned by volunteers and commanded by an officer, to engage the attacker. Eventually the British captured the proa, which was armed with two 6-pounder guns and had a crew of 30 men. Pirate casualties amounted to two men killed and one wounded; the British had no casualties.

The last attack occurred on 11 April. Sylvia spotted a lugger proa anchored near Krakatoa, which immediately set sail as the British approached. Drury sent Sub-Lieutenant Chesnaye and another party of volunteers in the proa that Sylvia had captured on 7 April. As the British proa approached the lugger, the lugger took flight and both proas passed behind an island that shielded them from Sylvia's sight. When Sylvia finally caught up with the two, the British were about to board the pirate lugger proa, which was putting up a stiff resistance. Sylvia opened fire on the enemy until the lugger sank. She had been armed with three 18-pounders and had had a crew of 72 men; pirate casualties were unknown. The British suffered eight men severely wounded, one of whom later died.

However, Sylvia's greatest fight was yet to come. On 26 April, Sylvia spotted three armed brigs and two lug sail vessels near Edam Island (now Damar Basam in Indonesia's Thousand Islands), all hastening towards Batavia. Sylvia was able to catch up with and bring to action the last-most brig, the Dutch navy brig Echo, of eight 6-pounder guns and 46 men, under the command of Lieutenant Christian Thaarup. Echo surrendered after a sharp engagement of 20 minutes duration. In the action, the Dutch lost three men killed and seven wounded; the British lost four men killed and three wounded.

As soon as she could return to the pursuit Sylvia did so, but the two Dutch brigs were able to escape to the shelter of the batteries on Onrust Island (now Kelor in the Thousand Islands). Still, she was able to capture the two transports, each of which had a crew of 60 men and was armed with two 9-pounder guns. The two transports were 12 days out of Surabaya and were carrying "Artillery Equipage and valuable European Goods." Drury received promotion to commander for his victory, with a date of 2 May 1810. In 1847, the Admiralty awarded the Naval General service Medal with clasp "Sylvia 26 April 1810" to the single surviving claimant from the action.

In 1811 Lieutenant Richard Crawford replaced Drury. By 1812 Sylvia was on the Downs station under the command of Lieutenant Robert Palk. He commanded her at the siege of San Sebastián, which took place between 7 July and 8 September 1813. In January 1819 Parliament voted a grant to the crews of the vessels, including Sylvia, that had served under the command of Lord Viscount Keith in the Channel in 1813 and 1814. November 1822 saw the last (third) payment of the grant. (Note: A first-class share of the first payment was £121 8s, of the second payment £80 18s 8d, and of the third payment (if the officer had participated in the first payment, £53 19s 1d. A sixth-class share of the first payment was £2 1s 1d, of the second payment £1 7s 5d, and of the third payment, 18s 4d if the recipient had participated in the first payment, and £2 12 11d if he had not.)

Between August 1814 and July 1815 Sylvia was at Portsmouth being fitted out as a dispatch vessel. In June 1815 Lieutenant Joseph Griffiths recommissioned her.

Disposal: In January 1816 the Admiralty put Sylvia up for sale at Plymouth. She was sold for £710 on 30 May 1816.

== Merchantman ==
Mercantile interests purchased Sylvia. The supplemental pages to the 1816 Register of Shipping shows Sylvia, Bermuda-built in 1806, of 138 tons (bm), with W. Jewell, master, and Jewell, owner. Her voyage is Plymouth-London.

Year	Master	Owner	Trade
1816	W. Jewell	Jewell	Plymouth-London
1817 not published			Montevideo-Marseilles
1818	W. Nunn	Jewell	London-Barcelona
1819	Hill	Jewell	Bristol-West Indies
1820	Hill	Jewell	London-Rio de Janeiro
1821	Hill	Jewell	London-Rio de Janeiro
1822	Hill	Jewell	Plymouth-Naples
1823	Corder	Jewell	Plymouth-Naples
1824	Buxall	Williams	London-Cape Coast Castle

On 10 January 1821, Sylvia, Hill, master, put into Plymouth. She had been sailing from Dublin to London but lost her mainmast and had sprung her foremast.

== Loss ==
Sylvia was under the command of Captain Boxwell (or Boxell, or Buxall) when she wrecked on the Bissagoa Shoals, off the coast of Africa. She was on a voyage from London to Cape Coast Castle, Gold Coast. Lloyd's List reported the loss on 3 February 1824, suggesting that Sylvia was lost in late 1823.
