= HMS Cassandra (1806) =

History

United Kingdom
- Name: HMS Cassandra
- Ordered: 2 April 1804
- Launched: 1806
- Commissioned: October 1806
- Fate: Capsized and sank 13 August 1807

General characteristics
- Class & type: Adonis-class schooner
- Tons burthen: 11093/94 bm
- Length: 68 ft 2 in (20.8 m) (gundeck); 50 ft 5 5/8 in (15.4 m) (keel)
- Beam: 20 ft 4 in (6.2 m)
- Depth of hold: 10 ft 3 in (3.12 m)
- Sail plan: Full-rigged ship
- Complement: 35
- Armament: 10 × 18-pounder carronades

HMS Cassandra was an Adonis-class schooner of the Royal Navy during the Napoleonic War. She was built at Bermuda using Bermudan cedar and completed in 1806.

Cassandra was commissioned in October 1806 under the command of Lieutenant George Le Blanc. She was ordered to carry dispatches to the squadron blockading Bordeaux, France. When she met up with the fifth rate frigate HMS Naiad on 13 August 1807, Le Blanc left Cassandra to take the dispatches to Naiad. Two sudden squalls rolled Cassandra over on her beam ends, capsizing her and causing her to sink stern first. Eleven men and one woman and her child drowned.
