= Kingston (1806 Whitby ship) =

History

United Kingdom
- Name: Kingston
- Owner: 1806:Captain & Co.; 1806:Hardcastle & Co.
- Builder: Holt & Richardson, Whitby
- Launched: 30 January 1806
- Fate: Abandoned by her crew 1819

General characteristics
- Tons burthen: 418, or 41849/94, or 426 (bm)
- Sail plan: Ship
- Armament: 6-12 × 6-pounder guns

Kingston was launched in 1806 and spent her career trading primarily between England and the West Indies, though also trading with Sicily, America, and India, and possibly Russia. Her crew abandoned her in 1819 when she developed a leak.

== Career ==
Kingston enters the Register of Shipping and Lloyd's Register with slightly inconsistent information. Discrepancies between the two registers appear several times, probably reflecting differences in the dates of the information and in publication, stale information, and possibly error.

Year	Master	Owner	Trade	Source	Master	Owner	Trade	Source
1806	Atkinson	Capt. & Co.	Whitby—London; London—Dominica	Register of Shipping	Atkinson	Hardcastle & Co.	London—Dominica	Lloyd's Register
1809	R. Atkinson; Hunter	Capt. & Co. Atkinson & Co.	London—Dominica; London—St Kitts	Register of Shipping	R. Atkinson	Hardcastle & Co.	London—Dominica	Lloyd's Register
1810	Hunter	Atkinson; Horncastle	London—St Kitts	Register of Shipping	R.Atkinson; Hunter	Hardcastle	London—West Indies	Lloyd's Register
1811	R. Hunter	Horncastle	London—St Kitts; London—Sicily	Register of Shipping	Hunter	Hardcastle	London—Jamaica	Lloyd's Register
1812	Hunter	Horncastle	London—Sicily	Register of Shipping	Hunter	Hardcastle	London transport	Lloyd's Register
1813	Hunter	Horncastle	London—West Indies	Register of Shipping	Hunter	Hardcastle	London transport	Lloyd's Register
1814	Hunter	Horncastle	London—St Croix	Register of Shipping	Hunter	Hardcastle	London—St Croix	Lloyd's Register
1815	Hunter; W. Smith	Horncastle; Barber	London—St Croix; London—America	Register of Shipping	Hunter	Hardcastle	London—Petersburg; London—Jamaica	Lloyd's Register
1816	W. Smith; Hunter	J.Barber; Horncastle	Liverpool—America; London—America	Register of Shipping	Hunter	Hardcastle	London—Jamaica	Lloyd's Register
1818	Barlow	Horncastle	London—India	Register of Shipping	Marlow	Hardcastle	London—India	Lloyd's Register
1819	Barlow	Horncastle	London—India	Register of Shipping	Marlow	Hardcastle	London—India	Lloyd's Register
1820	Horncastle	Horncastle	London—Yucatán	Register of Shipping	Marlow	Hardcastle	London—India	Lloyd's Register

== Fate ==
Lloyd's List reported on 3 December 1819 that Kingston, Horncastle, master, had sprung a leak while sailing from Honduras to London. The crew abandoned her in the Gulf of Florida.
