= Mary Ann (1806 ship) =

History

United Kingdom
- Name: Mary Ann
- Launched: 1806, Chester
- Fate: Wrecked 9 November 1816

General characteristics
- Tons burthen: 313 (bm)
- Armament: 4 × 9-pounder guns + 10 × 24-pounder carronades

Mary Ann was launched in 1806 at Chester. She made one voyage as a slave ship in the triangular trade in enslaved people. Between 1812 and 1814 she was a whaler in the British southern whale fishery. Afterwards she started trading with Charleston, but in November 1816 she was driven ashore near Liverpool as she was outward bound. She was surveyed and found not worthy of repair.

== Career ==
Mary Ann first appeared in Lloyd's Register (LR) in 1806.

Year	Master	Owner	Trade	Source
1806	R.Curran	Forbes & Co.	Liverpool–Africa	LR

Captain Nathaniel McGhie sailed from Liverpool on 8 December 1806, bound for the Gold Coast. Mary Ann arrived at Jamaica on 20 July 1807 with 298 captives. She sailed from Jamaica on 29 September and arrived at Liverpool on 21 November. At some point Captain John Ferguson replaced McGhie. She had left Liverpool with 45 crew members and she had suffered three crew deaths on the voyage.

By the time Mary Ann returned, the Slave Trade Act 1807, which banned British vessels from engaging in the slave trade, had taken effect. Her next voyage was as a West Indiaman, to Jamaica. Mary Ann, Ferguson, master, arrived at Gravesend from Jamaica on 12 July 1808.

Year	Master	Owner	Trade	Source
1809	Berne	Berne	London–South Seas	LR

In 1809 Captain Bernie sailed to Port Jackson. Mary Ann arrived there on 14 August with merchandise. She left on 15 October, bound for England.

Year	Master	Owner	Trade	Source
1810	Berne; J.Napier	Berne	London–South Seas	LR
1811	J.Napier	Bernie & Co.	London–Jamaica	LR
1812	J.Napier; J.Bernie	Berne	London–Jamaica; New South Wales	LR

Although Lloyd's Register showed Bernie as master of Mary Ann, it was Joseph Moore who sailed from England on 1 March 1812, bound for New South Wales and then the British southern whale fishery. Mary Ann arrived at Port Jackson on 12 August with merchandise. She sailed on 4 October for the sperm whale fishery. Mary Ann. sailed to New Zealand, and then on to Timor and the Moluccas. Homeward bound, she returned via the Cape of Good Hope and Saint Helena. At Saint Helena she joined a convoy to England under escort by HMS Barracouta. Mary Ann arrived back at England on 6 November 1814.

Year	Master	Owner	Trade	Source
1815	J.Birnie; N.Eames	Birnie & Co.	London–New South Wales	LR
1816	N.Eames; T.Rowe	Gilchrist & Co.	Liverpool–Jamaica	LR
1819	T.Rowe	Gilchrist & Co.	Liverpool–Charleston	LR

== Fate ==
Although Lloyd's Register continued to carry Mary Ann to 1823 with data unchanged from 1819, Mary Ann had already been condemned in 1816.

On 9 November 1816 as Mary Ann, Rowe, master, was on her way from Liverpool to Charleston when she was driven ashore at Garston, Liverpool. Her cargo was discharged. The next issue of Lloyd's List reported that Mary Ann had been surveyed and declared unworthy of repair.
