= Salamander (1806 ship) =

History

United Kingdom
- Name: Salamander
- Namesake: Salamander
- Builder: Blyth, Northumberland
- Launched: 1806
- Fate: Wrecked 25 August 1823

General characteristics
- Tons burthen: 93 (bm)
- Armament: 2 × 4-pounder guns (1811)

Salamander was launched at Blythe in 1806. She traded as a coaster on the west coast of England and then to the Baltic. She was wrecked on the Swedish coast in 1823.

== Career ==
She first appeared in the registers in 1809 in the Register of Shipping (RS) with Lawson, master, H.Debord, owner, and trade Shields coaster.

A gale on 10 November 1810 drove Salamander, "of Blythe", and a number of other vessels onshore on the coast of Lincolnshire between Tetney and Theddlethorpe. She underwent a thorough repair in 1811. She first entered Lloyd's Register (LR) in 1812.

Year	Master	Owner	Trade	Source
1812	John Rose	Captain & Co.	Hull–Oporto	LR; thorough repair 1811
1816	John Rose	Captain & Co.	Hull–Hamburg	LR; thorough repair 1811
1822	J.Rose; R.Davidson	Captain&Co. Frost & Co.	Hull–Hamburg; London coaster	LR; thorough repair 1811
1823	R.Davidson	Frost & Co.	London coaster	LR; thorough repair 1811

== Fate ==
Salamander was lost on 25 August 1823 off "Kole", Sweden. Her crew were rescued. She was on a voyage from Saint Petersburg, Russian Empire to London. Her crew, most of her cargo, and her materials were saved. Her entry in Lloyd's Register for 1824 carried the annotation "lost".
