= Mary (1811 Ipswich ship) =

History

United Kingdom
- Name: Mary
- Owner: 1811:M. Boyd; Buckles & Co.; 1830:Wigram; 1835:Ascough
- Builder: Jabez Bayley, Ipswich
- Launched: 8 May 1811
- Fate: Wrecked 1845

General characteristics
- Tons burthen: 361, or 365, or 369, or 3692/94, or 370 (bm)
- Armament: 1811:12 guns; 1815:4 × 9-pounder guns + 8 × 12-pounder carronades

Mary was launched in 1811 at Ipswich. She immediately made one voyage for the British East India Company (EIC), to New South Wales (NSW), and Bengal. She continued to trade with Australia and then made five voyages transporting convicts there: two to New South Wales, two to Van Diemen's Land, and one in which she carried convicts to both. She was sold in 1836, in Sydney. Mary was totally wrecked on a reef in 1845, while on a voyage from Sydney to London.

== Career ==
Mary appears in the 1811 volume of Lloyd's Register with Lauchlan, master, M. Boyd, owner, and trade London–Botany Bay.

=== EIC voyage (1811–1813) ===
Captain Lauchlan (or Laughlin) sailed from Portsmouth on 26 November 1811, bound for New South Wales and Bengal. Mary was at Madeira on 1 December, and Rio de Janeiro on 2 January 1812.

Mary arrived at Port Jackson on 2 May, with stores. She left on 1 August, bound for Bengal. She sailed in company with Clarkson, Clarkson, master. On 16 August, they saw a group of islands, the southernmost at 9°20′S 153°40′E. These appear to be the Laughlan (Nada) Islands of Waboma and Budelun in the Solomon Sea.

She reached Malacca on 28 September, arrived at Diamond Harbour on 27 October, and Calcutta on 1 November. Homeward bound, she was at Diamond Harbour again on 7 February 1813, and at Point de Galle on 13 March. She reached St Helena on 9 June, and arrived at The Downs on 10 August.

The Register of Shipping for 1815, showed Mary's master as Lauchlan, her owner as Boyd, and her trade as London transport.

The Register of Shipping for 1820, showed Mary's master as Moffat, her owner as Boyd, and her trade as London–Sierra Leone. She had undergone a large repair in 1819.

=== Convict voyage #1 (1823) ===
Captain J.F. Steele sailed from London on 10 June 1823, and arrived at Hobart on 5 October. She sailed on to Port Jackson and arrived there on 18 October. She had embarked 127 female convicts and she landed 67 at Hobart and 57 at Sydney, having perhaps left one in London before sailing.

Register of Shipping for 1825, showed Mary's master as Steele, her owner as Boyd, and her trade as London–New South Wales.

=== Convict voyage #2 (1829–1830) ===
Captain Alexander Jamieson sailed from London on 18 December 1829, and arrived at Hobart on 10 April 1830. Mary had embarked 168 male convicts and she disembarked 167, having suffered one convict death en route.

The Register of Shipping for 1830, showed Mary's master as Jameson, her owner as Wigram, and her trade as London–New South Wales. She had undergone a large repair in 1827.

=== Convict voyage #3 (1831) ===
Captain Jamieson sailed from London on 12 June 1831, and arrived at Hobart on 19 October. Mary had embarked 151 female convicts and she disembarked 149, having suffered two convict deaths en route.

=== Convict voyage #4 (1832-1833) ===
Captain Jamieson sailed from London on 4 September 1832, and arrived at Sydney on 5 January 1833. She had embarked 170 male convicts, and disembarked 168, having suffered two convict deaths en route.

=== Convict voyage #5 (1835) ===
Captain William Ascough sailed from London on 16 April 1835, and arrived at Sydney on 6 September. She had embarked 180 female convicts, and disembarked 177, having suffered two convict deaths en route, and perhaps relanded one before sailing.

Lloyd's Register for 1835, showed Mary's master as Ascough, her owner as Ascough, and her trade as London–Sydney. This entry continued unchanged through 1841.

== Fate ==
Lloyd's Register no longer listed Mary after 1841.

Mary had in fact been sold in Sydney in 1836, and was reregistered there in the names of J.T. Hughes and J. Hosking. There were several further changes of ownership until by 1844, the owners were Alexander Fotheringham, John H. Challis, and Robert Campbell. She was totally wrecked on 24 May 1845, on a reef NW of Flinders Island in Bass Strait with loss of 17 lives while on a voyage from Sydney towards London.
