= Clarkson (1806 ship) =

1806 ship

History

United Kingdom
- Name: Clarkson
- Builder: Hull
- Launched: 1806
- Fate: Last listed 1833

General characteristics
- Tons burthen: 301, 302, or 303 (bm)
- Armament: 2 × 9-pounder guns + 10 × 12-pounder carronades

Clarkson was launched at Kingston upon Hull in 1806. Initially she traded with South America. She then made a voyage to Port Jackson, returning to England via India. On the way she participated in the discovery by Europeans of some islands in the Solomon Sea. After her return she traded primarily between Hull and Quebec, and on one occasion took migrants Quebec. She was last listed in 1833.

== Career ==
Clarkson first appeared in Lloyd's Register (LR) in 1806.

Year	Master	Owner	Trade	Source
1806	Stephenson	Clarkson	Hull–Buenos Aires	LR
1809	Stephenson; Skiff	Clarkson	Hull–Brazils; London	LR
1810	Skiff	Clarkson	London–Bahia	LR

On 2 July 1810 Clarkson, Scaife, master, sailed for the Brazils. (Note: Two major sources infer that this may signal an engagement in whaling, but there is no other support for that possibility. The mention in Lloyd's List simply lists her destination as "Brazils".)

Year	Master	Owner	Trade	Source
1811	Skiff; Clarkson	Clarkson	London–Brazils	LR
1812	Clarkson	Clarkson	London–New South Wales	LR

On 21 October 1811 Clarkson, Clarkson, master, was at Deal, waiting to sail for Botany Bay. On 26 January 1812 she arrived at Rio de Janeiro; she sailed from Rio 6 February. She arrived at Port Jackson on 7 May with stores for the government. She sailed on 1 August, bound for Calcutta.

She sailed in company with Mary, David Laughlan, master. On 16 August they saw a group of islands, the southernmost at 9°20′S 153°40′E. These appear to be the Laughlan (Nada) Islands of Waboma and Budelun in the Solomon Sea. Clarkson arrived back at Gravesend on 12 August 1813.

Year	Master	Owner	Trade	Source & notes
1814	Clarkson; W[illiam] Ross	Clarkson	London–New South Wales	LR
1815	W.Ross	Glennie & Co.	London–Demerara	LR
1821	W.Ross; Cox	Glennie & Co. Captain & Co.	London–Demerara; Hull–Baltic	LR; repairs 1821
1821	Cox	Captain & Co.	Hull–Baltic; Hull–Quebec	LR; repairs 1821, and large repair 1822
1824	W.Cox; A.Haigh	Captain & Co.	Hull–Baltic; Hull–Quebec	LR; repairs 1821, large repair 1822, & repairs 1823
1825	A.Haigh	Stevenson	Hull–Quebec	LR; large repair 1822, repairs 1823 & 1824
1826	R.Ward	Stevenson	Belfast–Quebec	LR; large repair 1822, repairs 1823 & 1824, & damages repaired 1826

On 22 October 1825 Clarkson, Ward, master, was returning to Hull from Quebec when she went onshore at Green Island Reef. She received considerable damage and was obliged to unload.

On 3 May 1827 Clarkson, Ward, master, arrived at Quebec with 44 settlers from Hull. She cleared Customs to return to Hull 30 May.

Year	Master	Owner	Trade	Source & notes
1830	R.Ward; Coltman	Stevenson	Hull–Quebec	LR; large repair 1822, thorough repair 1829, damages repaired 1830
1831	S.Coltman	Stevenson	Cork–Quebec	large repair 1822, thorough repair 1829, damages repaired 1831
1832	S.Coltman; J.Irvin	Stevenson	Cork–Quebec	large repair 1822, thorough repair 1829 & 1830, damages repaired 1831 & 1832

In December 1831 Clarkson, Irvin, master, was brought into Hull damaged. She had to discharge in the Humber.

== Fate ==
Clarkson was last listed in the registers in 1833.
