= Mary (1811 Bideford ship) =

History

United Kingdom
- Name: Mary
- Owner: 1811:W. Fry & Co.; 1815:Taylor & Co.
- Builder: Richard Chapman, Bideford
- Launched: 22 March 1811
- Fate: Last listed in 1835

General characteristics
- Tons burthen: 405, or 4057/94, or 406 (bm)
- Armament: 14 × 12-pounder carronades + 2 × 6-pounder chase guns

Mary was launched in 1811 at Bideford. She was a West Indiaman that made one voyage transporting convicts to New South Wales. She then returned to the West Indies trade, before trading with Quebec. She is no longer listed after 1835.

== Career ==
Mary entered Lloyd's Register in 1811 with Lusk, master, Wm. Fry, owner, and trade London–Grenada. The next year her master changed to Brown.

In 1815 Mary's master changed from G. Brown to Herbert, her owner was Taylor & Co., and her trade changed from London–Grenada to London–Saint Vincent.

Convict transport: Captain John Lusk sailed from the Cove of Cork on 25 May 1819 and arrived at Port Jackson on 26 August 1819. Mary had embarked 160 convicts and landed 159, having suffered one convict death en route. Thirty soldiers drawn from the 53rd, 59th, and 87th Regiments of Foot provided the guard. They were under the command of Lieutenant Wilton of the 87th.

Lusk sailed to Bengal, via Bencoolen. At Bencoolen in March he took on board a "large collection of the natural history of Sumatra" that Sir Stamford Raffles had collected and donated to the EIC's museum in Calcutta.

Mary left Bengal on 6 May 1820 and St Helena on 15 August. She arrived at Deal on 21 October, having endured gales from 15 October to 20 October. On the 16th a heavy sea stove in her stern deadlights and filled the cabin. The next day she was lying-to when a tremendous sea swept over her, taking away her bulwarks, boats, spars, binnacle, and compasses. The capstan was torn from its spindle, and there was extensive loss of sails and rigging.

Year	Master	Owner	Trade	Notes and source
1820	Lusk	Taylor & Co.	London–New South Wales	Register of Shipping (RS)
1825	M'Clure	Taylor & Co.	London–Jamaica	Damage repaired 1817; RS
1830	Matthews; Hooten	Fry & Co.	Liverpool–Trinidad; London–Quebec	RS
1835	J. Deaves	R. Deaves	Cork; Cork–Quebec	Large repair 1835; Lloyd's Register (LR)

== Fate ==
Although Mary apparently underwent a large repair in 1835, she is no longer listed in 1836.
