= Glenmore (1806 ship) =

History

United Kingdom
- Name: Glenmore
- Launched: 1806, Elgin
- Fate: Wrecked September 1822

General characteristics
- Tons burthen: 298 (bm)
- Complement: 20
- Armament: 1807: 14 × 9&6-pounder guns; 1814:8 × 6-pounder guns + 4 × 12-pounder carronades
- Notes: Fir built

Glenmore was launched as a West Indiaman in 1806 at Elgin. She made one voyage to Bengal in 1813–14, then became a Greenland whaler in 1818, and made four full whaling voyages. She was lost in the White Sea in 1822.

== Career ==
Glenmore entered Lloyd's Register (LR) in 1807 with A. James, master, Twemlow, owner, and trade Liverpool–Suriname. Captain Alexander James acquired a letter of marque on 16 September 1807.

LR for 1810 showed Glenmore with J.Golding, master, Moss $ Co. owners, and trade London–Madeira.

In 1813 the British East India Company (EIC) lost its monopoly on the trade between India and Britain. British ships were then free to sail to India or the Indian Ocean under a license from the EIC.

Although it is not clear that Glenmore ever received a license from the EIC, on 22 March 1813 she was at Deal, nominally intending to sail to the Cape of Good Hope. On 13 May 1813 she was at Madeira, and on the 20th she sailed for the Cape.

LR for 1814 showed her with W. Vaughn, master, Osborne & Co., owners, and trade London–Île de France.

Lloyd's List (LL) reported on 12 July 1814 that Glenmore, Vaughn, master, had sailed from Bengal for London on 26 January 1814. She arrived back at Gravesend on 15 August.

LR for 1816 showed Glenmore with Lang, master, changing to Arman, Extar & Co., owners, and trade London–Demerara.

Glenmore, Arman, master, put into Corunna on 7 January 1817 for repairs. She had been sailing from London for Antigua when she suffered trifling damages. It was expected that she would sail in a few days.

Greenland whaler: The Register of Shipping (RS) for 1818 showed her master as Lang, changing to Roster, her owner as Exeter, changing to T.Olds, and her trade as London–West Indies, changing to London–Greenland. She had undergone small repairs in 1816.

Glenmore made four full voyages to the Greenland whale fishery from London.

| Year | Master | Whales | Tuns of whale oil |
|---|---|---|---|
| 1818 | Rozier | 3 | 37 |
| 1819 | Duncan | 3 | 31 |
| 1820 | Todd | 17 | 92 (Note: A report dated 19 June 1820 stated that Glenmore had four fish (whales), and 100 tuns. Ninety-two tuns for 17 whales seems low given the other numbers in this table. However, 100 tuns for four whales seems high, again given the numbers in this table.) |
| 1821 | Todd | 6 | 60 |

== Fate ==
Glenmore, Todd, master, and Henry were totally lost in the White Sea on 26 September 1822 but their crews survived and proceeded to Archangel in the ships' boats. Glenmore was on a voyage from Onega, Russia, to London.

The entry for Glenmore in the 1823 RS has the annotation "LOST" by her name.
