= HMS Peacock (1806) =

Brig-sloop of the Royal Navy

- Peacock

History

United Kingdom
- Name: HMS Peacock
- Ordered: 27 January 1806
- Builder: Jabez Bayley, Ipswich
- Laid down: April 1806
- Launched: 9 December 1806
- Fate: Sunk by USS Hornet, 1813

General characteristics
- Class & type: Cruizer-class brig-sloop
- Tons burthen: 383 64/94 (bm)
- Length: 100 ft 3 in (30.6 m) (overall); 77 ft 5 7/8 in (23.6 m) (keel)
- Beam: 30 ft 7 in (9.3 m)
- Depth of hold: 12 ft 9 in (3.9 m)
- Propulsion: Sails
- Sail plan: Brig
- Complement: 121 (Note: At the time of her loss, Peacock's quarter bill gave her complement as 134 men, of whom four were away in a prize.)
- Armament: 16 × 32-pounder carronades (Note: At the time of her loss, Peacock carried sixteen 24-pounder carronades.); 2 × 6-pounder bow guns (Note: At the time of her loss, Peacock carried two 9-pounder chase guns, one 4 or 6-pounder gun astern, one 12-pounder carronade in her topgallant forecastle, and two swivel guns.)

HMS Peacock was a Cruizer-class brig-sloop of the Royal Navy. She was launched in 1806 and had a relatively uneventful career until she had the misfortune to encounter USS Hornet in February 1813. Hornet captured Peacock, which then sank.

== Career ==
Peacock was commissioned under Commander William Peake in February 1807 for the North Sea. On 5 September Peacock was in company with the sloop Kite at the capture of Der Fruhllng. A week later Peacock was in company with the 74-gun Defence at the capture of the Danish ship Anna Karina.

In 1812 Peacock transferred to the Jamaica station. There, on 1 August, she captured the American ship Forester. (Note: A first-class share of the prize money was worth £84 17s 2d; a sixth-class share, that of an ordinary seaman, was worth 16s 2¼d.)

== Loss ==
On 24 February 1813 Peacock encountered USS Hornet off the mouth of the Demerara River. After she sailed out of the anchorage where she had left her sister ship Espiegle she encountered the 20-gun Hornet sailing in. Peacock and Hornet sailed opposite each other and exchanged broadsides at 5:25 pm. Peacock then turned to discharge her other broadside but Hornet got on Peacock's starboard quarter and proceeded to pour fire into her. Hornet's fire was accurate, while Peacock's was poor. Within 15 minutes Peake was dead, British casualties were heavy, and Peacock was a wreck. She struck and both vessels anchored. It became clear that Peacock was sinking and the Americans rescued her crew. She had suffered five men killed and 33 men wounded. Three of her wounded later died aboard Hornet. Four of her men, who escaped in a small boat, may also have been lost. Hornet had one man killed and four wounded, one of whom died later.

Peacock sank in five and a half fathoms of water (33 ft; 10 m) of the Caroband Bank. In sinking she took nine of her men with her, and three Americans. The wreck was visible for some time thereafter.

Lloyd's List initially reported that Captain Peake of Peacock and eight of her crew were killed in the action, and 27 were wounded; 19 men, who could not be rescued, went down with her when she sank and Hornet rescued the rest. Hornet had lost only one man killed and two wounded. She then arrived at Martha's Vineyard on 19 March.

Three men on Peacock's crew were Americans, one of whom was killed in the action. When it became clear that an engagement was imminent, the Americans asked to be permitted to go below so as not to have to fight against their countrymen. Peake refused the request and the men had to serve the guns. One of the two surviving Americans turned out to be a cousin of the wife of Captain James Lawrence, captain of Hornet. Peacock's captured ensign was on display at Mahan Hall at the U.S. Naval Academy, but was removed on 27 February 2018 for preservation.

Eventually, Peacock's surviving officers and crew were put on a cartel on which they reached Britain in June.

There was a dispute as to whether Espiegle was in sight during the action and had failed to come out and join the action. The Americans said she was, while the British said she was not. If the reported position of the wreck of Peacock is correct, Espiegle was not in sight. In 1814 Commander John Taylor underwent a court martial, the charges including that he had failed to join the engagement. He was acquitted of this charge.
