= Lord Collingwood (1806 ship) =

History

United Kingdom
- Name: Lord Collingwood
- Namesake: Cuthbert Collingwood, 1st Baron Collingwood
- Owner: Bulmer & Co.
- Builder: R & J Bulmer, South Shields.
- Launched: 1 April 1806
- Fate: Abandoned October 1828

General characteristics
- Tons burthen: 479, or 47993/94 or 480, or 482, or 48263/94 (bm)
- Length: 112 ft 6 in (34.3 m)
- Beam: 32 ft 2 in (9.8 m)
- Armament: 10 × 18-pounder carronades

Lord Collingwood was launched in 1806 at South Shields. She initially served as a transport. Then from 1816 on she started sailing to India under a license from the British East India Company (EIC). In 1828 her crew abandoned Lord Collingwood at sea.

== Career ==
Lord Collingwood first appeared in the Register of Shipping (RS) in 1809.

Year	Master	Owner	Trade	Source
1809	R.Gllie	R.Bullmer	London transport	RS
1814				RS: no entry

In 1814 Lord Collingwood disappeared from RS, and had not yet entered Lloyd's Register (LR). She first appeared in LR in 1816.

On 15 June 1814, Lord Collingwood and HMS "Picton" sailed from Bermuda to Halifax, Nova Scotia, carrying black refugees that had come from the Chesapeake Bay area on British warships. (Note: The vessel was probably HMS Pictou. Substituting Picton for Pictou was a common mistake but the Royal Navy did not use the name Picton until the 20th century. The mistake may have originated in the town of Pictou being relatively unknown, whilst Thomas Picton was a noted British general then serving in the Peninsular campaign.)

Year	Master	Owner	Trade	Source & notes
1816	Cotes	Bulmer	London–India	LR; new bulwarks and topsides 1815

In 1813 the EIC had lost its monopoly on the trade between India and Britain. British ships were then free to sail to India or the Indian Ocean under a licence from the EIC. Lord Collingwood's owners applied for such a licence on 1 March 1816 and received it on 12 March.

On 7 February 1816 Lord Collingwood, W. Coates, master, sailed for Bombay.

Year	Master	Owner	Trade	Source & notes
1818	Cotes; Parker	Bulmer	Plymouth–London	LR; new bulwarks and topsides 1815 & damages repaired 1818
1818	W.Coates; Parker	Bulmer	London–India	RS; new topsides, & thorough repair 1818

Lord Collingwood, Parkin, master, was coming out of Shields on 14 March 1818 on her way to London when she grounded. She was gotten off after she had discharged six or seven keels of coal. She was undamaged and proceeded on her voyage.

Year	Master	Owner	Trade	Source & notes
1819	Parkin	Bulmer	London–Calcutta	LR; new bulwarks and topsides 1815 & damages repaired 1818
1822	Parkin; Hawitson	Bulmer	London–Calcutta	LR; new bulwarks and topsides 1815 & damages repaired 1818

In 1822, Lord Collingwood was offered for sale at auction. The notice reported that she had been newly coopered, had partly new wales and topsides and a thorough repair in 1818, and had made only one voyage to India.

Year	Master	Owner	Trade	Source & notes
1823	Hewetson	Hewetson	London–Quebec	LR; new bulwarks and topsides 1815 & damages repaired 1818
1825	Hewetson	Hewetson	Bristol–New Brunswick	LR; new bulwarks and topsides 1815, damages repaired 1818, & small repairs 1823
1827	Hewetson; Watson	Hewetson	Plymouth	LR; new bulwarks and topsides 1815, damages repaired 1818, & small repairs 1823
1828	J.Wardell; D.Hewson	Hewetson	Bristol–Miramichi	LR; new bulwarks and topsides 1815, damages repaired 1818, & small repairs 1823
1828	Hewson	D.Hewson	Bristol–North America	RS; large repair 1824 & thorough repair 1827

== Fate ==
Lord Collingwood, Freeman, master, was on a voyage in October 1828 from Bristol, Gloucestershire to Quebec when her crew had to abandon her at (40°47′N 50°42′W) in the Atlantic Ocean. The US vessel Eliza Grant rescued the crew and took them to New York.
