= Manchester Packet (1806 ship) =

History

United Kingdom
- Name: Manchester Packet
- Builder: New York
- Launched: 1806
- Fate: Sold c.1818

United States
- Name: Manchester Packet
- Acquired: c.1818 by purchase
- Fate: Condemned 1835

General characteristics
- Tons burthen: 229, or 238 (bm)

Manchester Packet was built at New York in 1806. She immediately transferred to British registry and spent a number of years trading across the Atlantic. In 1814, she successfully repelled an attack by a U.S. privateer. In 1818, she returned to U.S. registry. She eventually became a whaler operating out of New London, Connecticut. In May 1828, she made the first of five whaling voyages; she was condemned in 1835, while on her sixth voyage.

== Merchantman ==
Manchester Packet first entered Lloyd's Register in 1806, with P.T. Coffin, master, "New York" owner, and trade Liverpool–New York.

Lloyd's Register for 1810, carries the same information, as does the Register of Shipping, except that it gives her owner as Capt. & Co.

Manchester Packet on 20 December 1814, engaged an American privateer and had to refit at Salvador, Bahia.

Lloyd's Register for 1818, still carried Manchester Packet. It listed her master as P.T. Coffin, her owner as "New York", and her trades as Liverpool–New York. She was no longer listed in 1819.

In 1824, Manchester Packet twice carried specie in the form of dollars from Havre, France, to New York at the behest of the U.S. Government. On 25 July, she delivered $14,800 and on 27 October, she delivered $4,840.

== Whaler ==
Whaling voyage #1 (1828–1829): Captain Maxwell (or Marshall) Griffing sailed from New London in May 1828. Manchester Packet returned in June 1829, with 1343 barrels of whale oil.

Whaling voyage #2 (1829–1830): Captain James Fordham sailed from New London in June 1829. Manchester Packet returned in June 1830, with 1194 barrels.

Whaling voyage #3 (1830–1831): Captain Fordham sailed from New London in July 1830. Manchester Packet returned in June 1831, with 23 barrels of sperm oil and 947 barrels of whale oil.

Whaling voyage #4 (1831–1832): Captain Robert N. Tate sailed from New London in 1831. Manchester Packet returned on 27 February 1832.

Whaling voyage #5 (1832–1833): Captain David Reed sailed from New London in 1832. Manchester Packet returned on 3 October 1833, with 230 barrels of sperm oil and 1436 barrels of whale oil.

== Loss ==
Captain David Reed sailed from New London in November 1833. Lloyd's List reported on 18 September 1835, that Manchester Packet, Reid, master, had put into the River Gambia on 27 August, leaky. She was condemned there.
