= Hannah Elizabeth (ship) =

American schooner

Coordinates: 28.3405°N 96.3809°W

History
- Name: Hannah Elizabeth
- Builder: Silas Greenman Jr., (Stonington, CT)
- Launched: 1829
- Homeport: Stonington, Connecticut
- Fate: Wrecked, November 1835

General characteristics
- Type: Schooner
- Tons burthen: 74 72/95 tons bm
- Length: 67 ft 10 in (20.68 m)
- Beam: 20 ft 10 in (6.35 m)
- Draft: 6 ft 1.75 in (1.87 m)

Hannah Elizabeth was built in 1829 in Stonington, Connecticut. Records of the time describe her as being a two-masted schooner, 67 feet long and 20 feet wide. At the time of the sinking her weight was listed as 74 tons, also recorded was that she was armed with three cannons; two 6-pounders and one 4-pounder.

In 1835, Peter Kerr, Fernando de Leon and Jesus Carbajal chartered the Hannah Elizabeth to carry trade supplies and munitions from New Orleans to Matagorda. A portion of the shipment was for Colonel Fannin and the newly formed Texan Army in this area during the Texas Revolution. On November 19, 1835, a Mexican warship, Montezuma, sighted the Hannah Elizabeth along the Texas coast. During the ensuing chase the Hannah Elizabeth became stranded on a sandbar as she attempted to enter Pass Cavallo to the safety of Matagorda Bay. The Montezuma’s crew took advantage of this and fired upon the Hannah Elizabeth, as she lay helplessly beached.

The crew of the Hannah Elizabeth, realizing that their ship was about to be captured carrying contraband material, threw most of the cargo overboard. This cargo included 500 muskets, two field cannons, gunpowder and ammunition. The Montezuma’s crew proceeded to board the Hannah Elizabeth capturing her crew and leaving a small crew from the Montezuma on board to guard the stranded ship. During the evening severe weather forced the Montezuma to retreat, at which time a small Texas ship, William Robbins, recaptured the Hannah Elizabeth. A complete salvage of the vessel and her remaining cargo was thwarted when the vessel rolled over and broke up in the breakers.

During the 1999 expedition to find the second La Salle ship, the L’Aimable, a wreck was found and explored that lay on the southeast side of the entrance into Pass Cavallo. In 2001 divers from the Texas Historical Commission (THC) and Texas A&M University conducted further exploration of this site. Over 200 artifacts were recovered, including the remains of muskets, cannonballs, lead shot, and many other military items that were dated from the early 19th century. After research by the THC & Texas A&M, the Hannah Elizabeth was picked as the most likely candidate for this shipwreck.
