= List of vessels lost on the Haak Sand on 24 December 1811 =

On 24 December 1811, a storm resulted in the wrecking of six vessels on the Haak Sand north of Texel and the loss of over 600 lives.

Grasshopper, The 74-gun HMS Hero, the ship-sloop Egeria, the brig-sloop Grasshopper and the hired armed ship Prince William left Gothenburg on 18 December 1811 as escorts to a convoy of 15 transports and a fleet of merchantmen, some 120 sail or more. Four or five days later Egeria and Prince William separated, together with the vessels going to the Humber and Scotland, including most of the merchant vessels. The transports and a handful of the merchantmen proceeded with Hero and Grasshopper.

On 24–25 December Hero and Grasshopper and the vessels they were escorting encountered a storm that result in the loss of most of them.

== Naval vessels ==
Vessel	Death toll	Notes
Hero	Loss of all but 12 of her 600 crew	She grounded and within 15 minutes the distress signals ceased; by next morning she was completely wrecked
Grasshopper	Only the pilot drowned	She crossed the sandbank but then was trapped and had to surrender to the Dutch the next day

== Transport vessels and merchantmen ==
Vessel	Death toll	Notes
Archimedes	20 of the crew saved	
Beckman	Master and 13 crew lost	Of Baltimore; in ballast
Centurion	Crew lost	Eight carronades
Flora	Part of the crew saved	Of 359 tons, sunk; 1500 barrels of powder & 250 chests of arms; a great number of chests are expected to be recovered
Rosina	Master and 17 crew lost	Of 350 tons; in ballast

== See also ==
- HMS St George § last voyage and loss in the same storm off Jutland
