= HMS St George (1785) =

British ship of the line (1785–1811)

Coordinates: 56°21′30″N 8°6′00″E

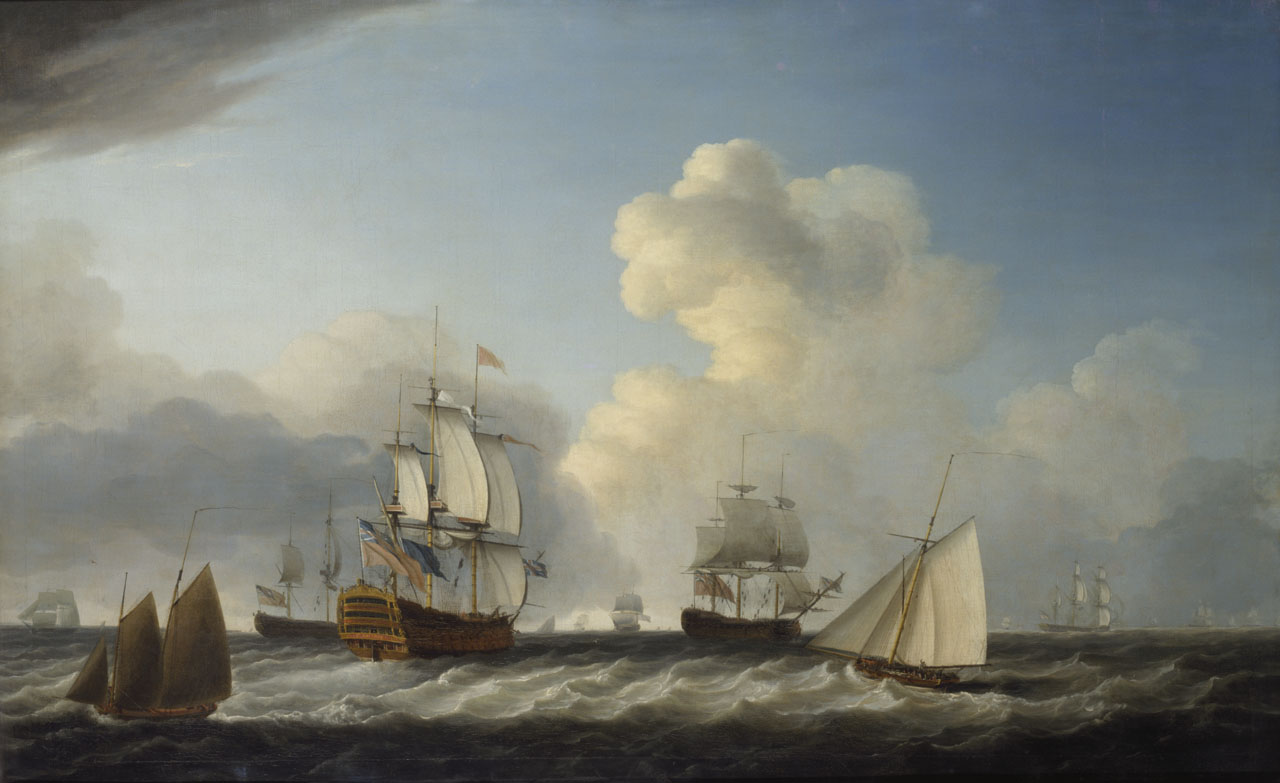
- St George and other vessels.

History

Great Britain
- Name: HMS St George
- Ordered: 16 July 1774
- Builder: Portsmouth
- Laid down: August 1774
- Launched: 14 October 1785
- Honours and awards: Participated in: Battle of the Hyères Islands; Battle of Copenhagen
- Fate: Wrecked, 1811

General characteristics
- Class & type: Duke-class ship of the line
- Tons burthen: 1931 (bm)
- Length: 177 ft 6 in (54.1 m) (gundeck)
- Beam: 50 ft (15.2 m)
- Depth of hold: 21 ft 2 in (6.5 m)
- Propulsion: Sails
- Sail plan: Full-rigged ship
- Complement: 850 officers and men
- Armament: Gundeck: 28 × 32-pounder guns; Middle gundeck: 30 × 18-pounder guns; Upper gundeck: 30 × 12-pounder guns; QD: 8 × 12-pounder guns; Fc: 2 × 12-pounder guns

HMS St George was a 98-gun second rate ship of the line of the Royal Navy, launched on 14 October 1785 at Portsmouth. In 1793 she captured one of the richest prizes ever. She then participated in the Battle of the Hyères Islands in 1795 and took part in the Battle of Copenhagen in 1801. She wrecked off Jutland in 1811 with the loss of almost all her crew.

== Service ==
In 1793 Captain John Gell was appointed a Rear-Admiral of the Blue and raised his flag on the St George. While in the Mediterranean with his division of the fleet, Gell was able to seize a French privateer and its Spanish-registered prize the St Jago. These ships were said to be some of the most valuable prizes ever brought to England. The ownership of the St Jago was a matter of some debate and was not settled until 4 February 1795, when the value of the cargo was put at £935,000 (equivalent to £122,020,000 in 2023). At this time all the crew, captains, officers and admirals could expect to share in this prize. Admiral Hood's share was £50,000 (equivalent to £6,520,000 in 2023). The ships that conveyed St Jago to Portsmouth were St George, Egmont, Edgar, Ganges, and Phaeton.

In October 1793 Gell was able to obtain the surrender of the French frigate Modeste, which had abused the neutrality of the port of Genoa. After this Gell had to return to England for the last time due to ill health.

St George was present at the Battle of the Hyères Islands in 1795. In 1798, some of her crew were court-martialed for mutiny.

The ship took part in the Battle of Copenhagen in 1801, flying Horatio Nelson's flag. He transferred to Elephant before the battle, as it was better suited for the shallow waters; St George remained in the background during the fighting. Her captain was Thomas Masterman Hardy, future captain of HMS Victory under Nelson at the Battle of Trafalgar. Captain Sir William Bolton earned his promotion to Commander after his service on the St George in this battle, on 2 April 1801. In 1847 the Admiralty authorized the issuance of the Naval General Service Medal with clasp "Copenhagen 1801" to all remaining survivors of the battle.

== Last voyage and loss ==
Key locations of the last voyage of HMS St. George

After the bombardment of Copenhagen in September 1807 and the capture of the Royal Danish Fleet followed the Gunboat War between Denmark/Norway and the United Kingdom. As a consequence of the war, convoys of merchant ships were escorted through Danish waters by British navy ships in order to protect the merchant ships from attacks by Danish and Norwegian privateers. St. George took part in the convoys and was therefore in the Baltic Sea in autumn 1811, where her last voyage started.

=== Convoy and first wreckage ===
The events leading up to the loss of St. George are recorded by several sources. Most important is a letter by sergeant on St. George William Galey, written to his wife and dated Gothenburg, 2 December 1811. Another key source is the ship's log of HMS Cressy, led by Commander Charles Dudley Pater. Cressy escorted St. George until hours before the fatal stranding on the coast of Jutland.

- 1 November 1811. The last convoy of the year bound for Great Britain leaves Hanöbukten at Karlshamn. The convoy consist of 129 merchant ships, escorted by Royal Navy ships of the line and brigs under the command of Vice Admiral James Saumarez on HMS Victory and Rear Admiral Robert Carthew Reynolds on St. George. Other participating ships of the line were HMS Orion, HMS Hero, HMS Defence and HMS Dreadnought. A storm forces the convoy to turn around.
- 9 November. The convoy leaves Hanö again and pass the German island of Rügen.
- 12 November. Cressy and the brig HMS Bellette leaves Rostock and joins the convoy east of Fehmarn. A heavy storm forces the ships to anchor at Rødsand, a sandy shoal south of Lolland, Denmark. Many merchant ships were damaged in the storm and 12 are lost completely.
- 15 November. St. George collides with another ship and sails aground at Rødsand. All masts and the rudder are lost. St. George is freed from the shoal after 30 hours and fitted with jury rig and rudder, made from timber obtained from Cressy. The rudder was of the type devised by Thomas Pakenham.
- 21 November. The convoy leaves Rødsand. St. George is towed by Cressy.
- 1 December. The convoy arrives at the Swedish island Vinga, in the archipelago outside Gothenburg. St. George arrives the following day and undergoes further repairs. Saumarez has grave concerns about allowing St. George to continue, but Rear Admiral Reynolds and Daniel Oliver Guion, captain on St. George, maintain that St. George is able to make the journey across the North Sea.

=== North Sea and stranding ===
The days leading up to the stranding are documented by Commander Pater's log on Cressy and in greater detail in a classified report written by Pater to the Admiralty and a personal letter to his friend, Commander Lukin (documents at the National Maritime Museum, London; available in Danish translation in Jepsen, 1993). The stranding itself is documented through eyewitness accounts from the few survivors and spectators on the beach and are preserved through official reports from Danish authorities and local newspapers.

- 16–17 December. Roughly 150 merchant ships leave Vinga, together with eight ships of the line: HMS Victory, HMS St. George, HMS Dreadnought, HMS Vigo, HMS Cressy, HMS Orion, HMS Hero and HMS Defence, HMS Dictator as well as some smaller navy vessels, including the Bellette. Hero, which also suffered damage in the storm, and St. George are closely followed by Defence and Cressy.
- 19 December. St. George, Defence, Cressy, Bellette and numerous merchant ships are forced to turn around in Skagerrak because of storm and heavy seas. Cressy is towing St. George, as her temporary rudder, only held in place by chains and heavy ropes, cannot maintain St. George on course.
- 21 December. The ships seek shelter four nautical miles north-east of Sälö lighthouse. The wind changes and it is decided to do a new attempt at crossing Skagerrak and the North Sea. On this attempt St. George is not towed by Cressy.

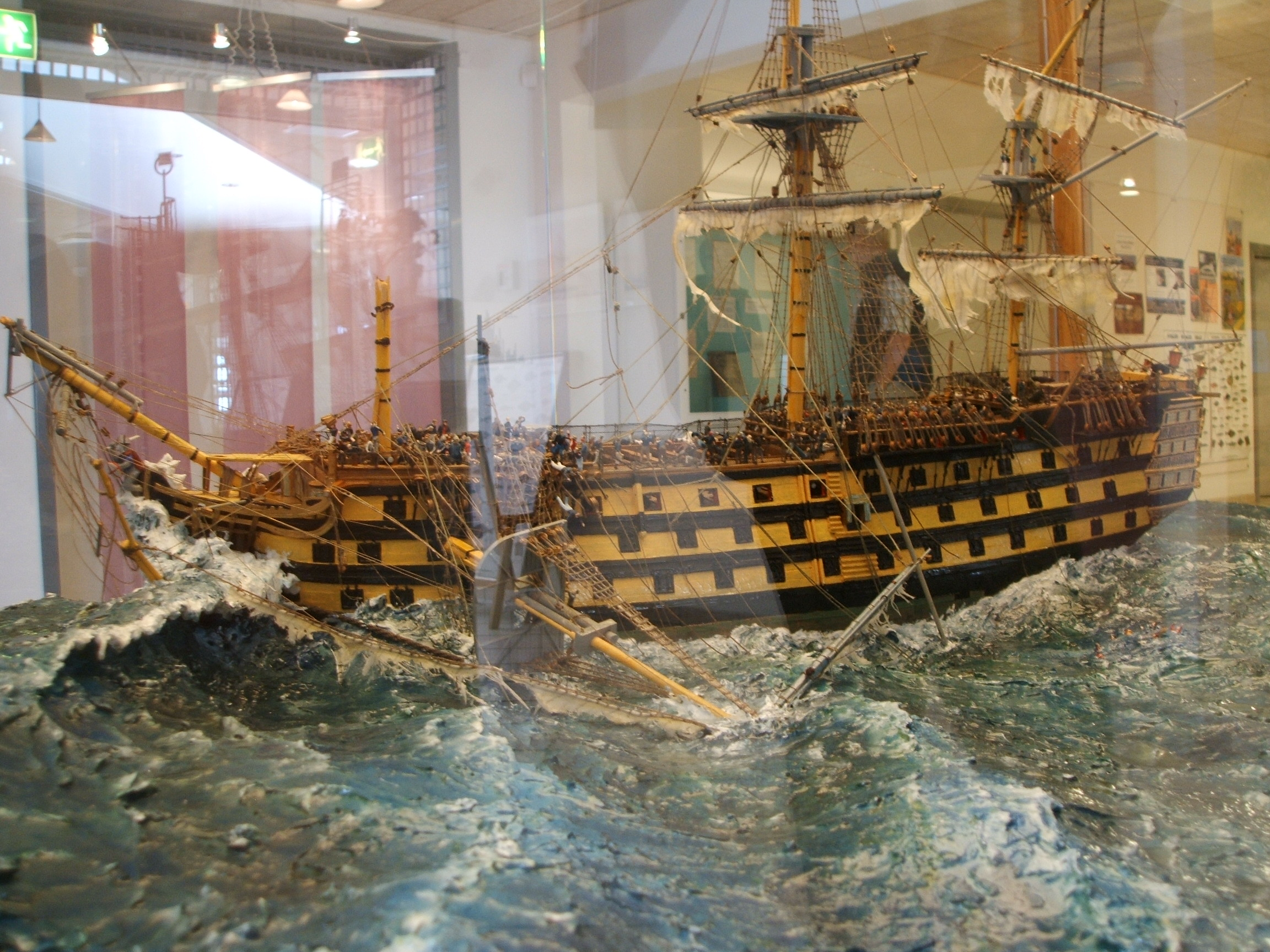
Model of St. George with broken foremast

- 23 December 1811. A extratropical cyclone is now blowing from north-west and the ships are in severe difficulties. Cressy and Bellette turn to avoid stranding. Defence briefly attempts to tow St. George, but the wire breaks. Defence later wrecks further down the coast with loss of all but 12 men.

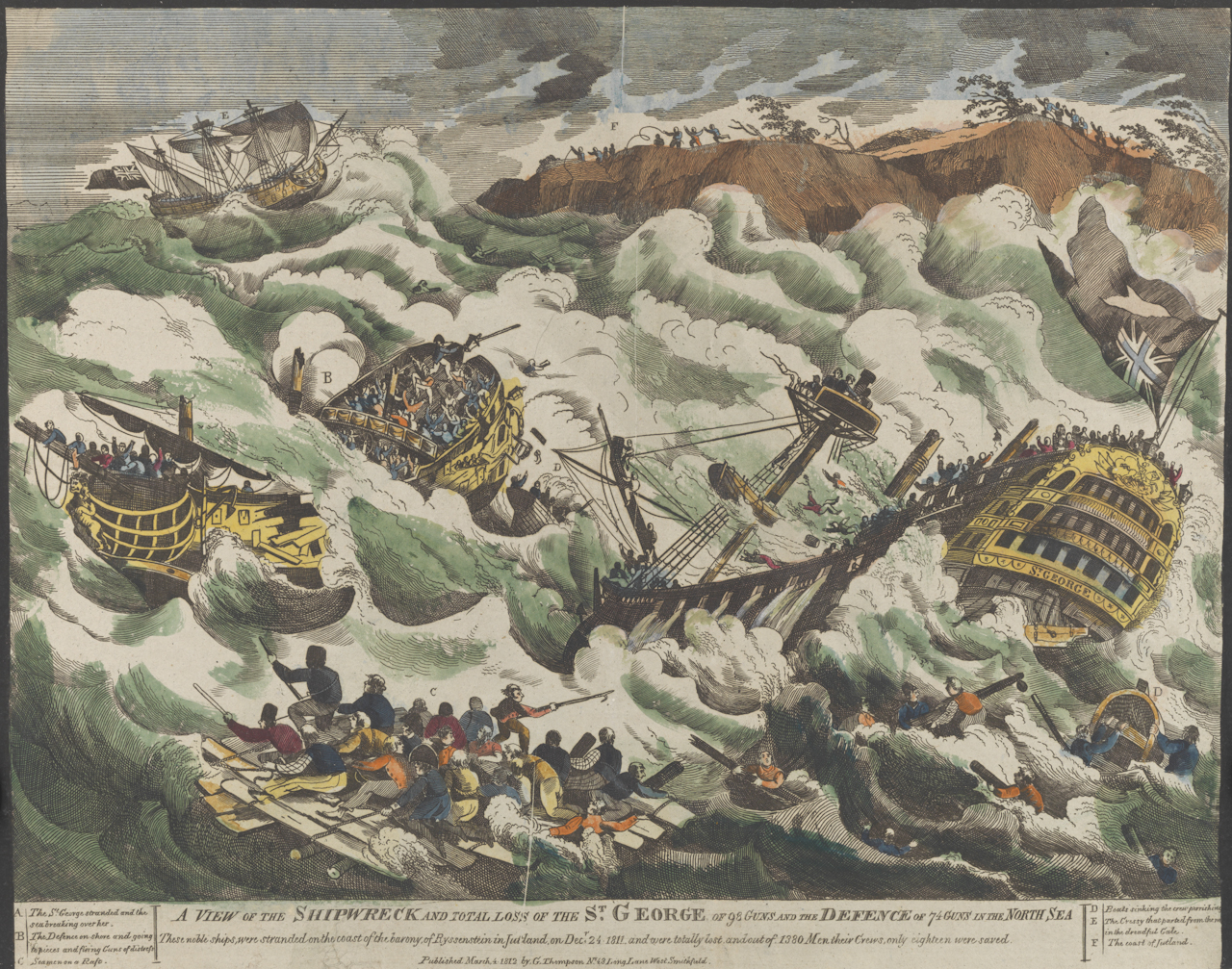
A View of the shipwreck and total loss of the St George, and the Defence

- 24 December. Early during the night St. George attempts a downwind turn by raising the jib, but it blows out and the top sail cannot be pulled. Placing tarpaulins in the netting also fails to give any speed for turning. An anchor is dropped, but the wire catches the temporary rudder and breaks it. At 6 AM St. George takes the ground on the outermost sandbar, 500 m from land and a couple of kilometers south of Thorsminde. She immediately develops a strong list. The carpenter reports 10 feet of water in the storage. Masts are cut to relieve the ship and all men are ordered to the pumps. All boats, except the longboat, are lost overboard. Fourteen men attempt to sail to land in the longboat but it capsizes and they drown. The mizzen mast is cut by means of knives, as all axes have been lost. Everyone around is pulled into the sea when the storm takes the mast. At 10 AM a giant wave pulls about 400 men off the ship, many already dead from hypothermia and exhaustion. At 12 PM the ship is no longer under command. Parts of the stern and great cabin were still visible in the afternoon. Some sailors are seen from the coast, trying to make their way to the beach clinging to the remnants of a mast, but they all drown in the attempt. In the evening about 150 people are still on board the wreck.
- 25 December. About 10 men from the wreck manage to make it on board a raft, but only 4 have tied themselves well enough to the raft to make it to shore, more dead than alive. Later eight men attached to drifting timber make it to the shore.
- 26 December. No further signs of life on board the wreck.

=== Events on HMS Cressy ===
The report from Commander Pater to the Admiralty, as well as two notes signed by the officers on Cressy (available at the National Maritime Museum, London, but also in Danish translation in Jepsen, 1993) describe the difficulties that also Cressy faced during the storm. The first letter was presented to Pater at 9 PM on 23 December and states that they find it an absolute necessity to try saving the ship by setting sail and turning away from the coast. Implicitly this meant that they would leave St. George (and the vice admiral) to their own fate. The second note, delivered to Pater at 10:45 PM, gives a description of the situation on St. George after they had turned and passed her, stating that her bow was heading east-north-east, most likely because the condition of the rudder prevented her from changing from port tack to starboard tack (meaning that St. George was inevitably heading for the coast) and they strongly advised the commander to set as many sails as possible to save Cressy, given that they were unable to assist St. George in any way. Undoubtedly, Pater was very well aware of the dire situation himself, as evidenced by his report to the Admiralty, where he writes that he knew already at 3 PM that St. George could not be saved. The only explanation for his hesitation to change course and save Cressy seems a reluctance to leave the vice admiral without his permission. The same reluctance seems the only explanation as to why Defence did not change course and ended up wrecked on the beach.

=== Aftermath ===
There is uncertainty about the number of survivors. Some sources state that only seven of her 738 crew were saved but other sources say 11, or most likely 12, citing the official journals from the interrogations of the survivors. One survivor, William Watson, stated that he was an American citizen and had been pressed to serve on board. He, and two other Americans, who survived from Defence, expressed a clear desire to not return to England or further serve in the Royal Navy. Over the following two weeks nearly 1,400 drowned men from St. George and Defence washed up on the beach south of the wrecks. The dead included Reynolds and Guion. Their bodies were never found, despite considerable effort to find them among the dead. Most of the bodies that came ashore were buried in the sand dunes of Thorsminde, which have been known ever since as "Dead Men's Dunes".

The Danish authorities quickly ordered Lieutenant Wigelsen to the area as Receiver of Wreck. Despite the fact that Britain was at war with Denmark-Norway and the survivors thus were prisoners of war, they were treated well by the locals and the authorities. They were relatively quickly returned to England, in exchange for double the number of Danish prisoners of war in British custody. The Danish Government promptly informed the Admiralty about the disaster and expressed their deepest empathy with what is still today the greatest loss of lives for the Royal Navy.

== Postscript ==
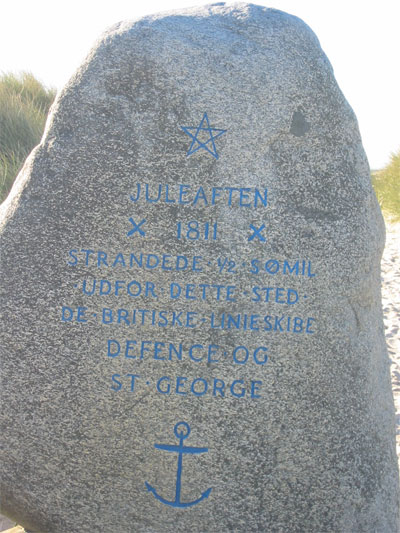
Front of main stone

A memorial was raised on the Dead Men's Dunes in 1937, initiated by the Danish press and originally suggested by the Danish vice admiral H. Rechnitzer and head of the search and rescue, V. Fabricius. The memorial consists of three stones with the following inscription on the back of the main store, facing the sea:

Under Christmas in enduring days
roared the Westjutland Sea
Hundreds of young men of war found in the dunes their graves
The stone raised to their memory
Guarded while centuries pass

(by newspaper editor Vidar Bruun, translated from Danish)

St George's ship's bell was recovered in 1876 and served as church bell in the church of No near Ringkøbing until May 2011. In May of that year the church renovated its bell tower and consequently presented the bell to the Strandingsmuseum St. George in Thorsminde.

Following the exposure of the wreck of St George by a storm in 1981, thousands of artefacts have been recovered from the wreck, many of which are on display at the Strandingsmuseum St George.

== See also ==
- List of vessels lost on the Haak Sand on 24 December 1811 the simultaneous wrecking of another convoy
