= Traveller (ship) =

Several vessels have been named Traveller.

- Traveller (1786 ship) was launched at Hull in 1786. She traded between Hull and the Baltic until 1798 or so, when she began making annual voyages as a Greenlandman, that is, as a whaler in the northern whale fishery. She was captured in 1808 during the Gunboat War while trading with the Baltic between whaling voyages.
- Traveller (1792 ship) was a ship launched at Whitby in 1792. First she traded with the Baltic, then she was a London-based transport. Next she traded between London and Quebec, and lastly she traded between England and the Baltic. She was lost in 1806 at Riga.
- Traveller (1804 ship) was a French prize that entered British records in 1804. She initially traded between Plymouth and Italy and then from 1805 made two voyages as whaler in the British southern whale fishery. Although the registers continued to list her as whaling after 1806 until 1813, she did not appear during this period in Lloyd's List's ship arrival and departure data.
- Traveller (1815 ship) was launched at Peterhead in 1815. Between 1821 and 1858 she sailed as a whaler in the northern whale fishery.

== See also ==
- HMS Traveller – any one of four vessels of the British Royal Navy
- USS Traveller - either of two vessels of the United States Navy
