= HMS Egeria (1807) =

Sloop of the Royal Navy

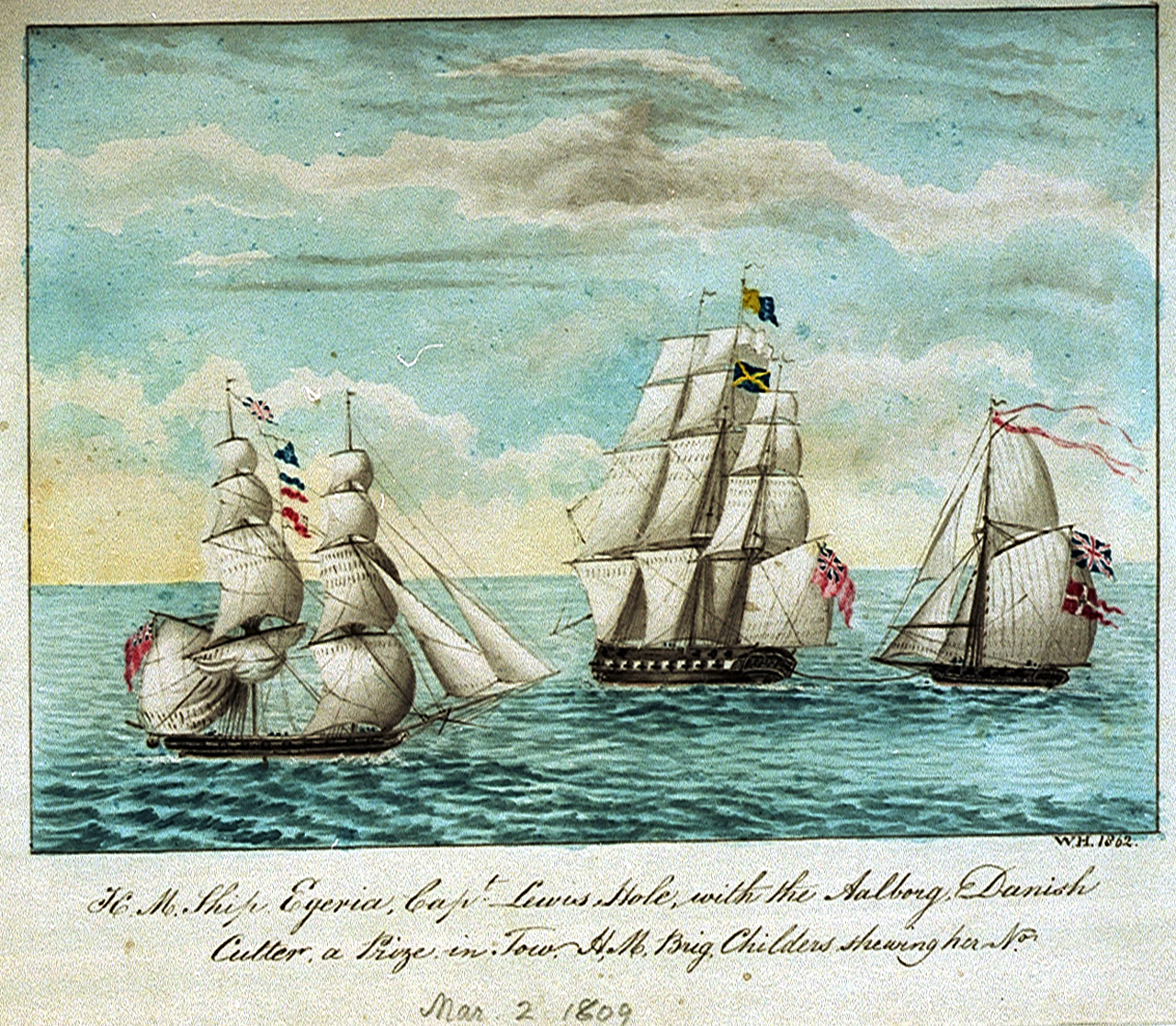
- HM Ship Egeria, Capt Lewis Hole, with the Aalborg, Danish Cutter, a prize, in Tow, HM Brig Childers shewing her Nos 2 March 1809

History

United Kingdom
- Name: HMS Egeria
- Ordered: 19 November 1805
- Builder: Nicholas Bools & William Good, Bridport
- Launched: 31 October 1807
- Fate: Receiving ship at Devonport from 1825; Broken up 1864

General characteristics
- Class & type: 18-gun Cormorant-class sloop
- Tons burthen: 42642/94 (bm)
- Length: 108 ft 3 in (33.0 m) (overall); 90 ft 7 in (27.6 m) (keel)
- Beam: 29 ft 9 in (9.1 m)
- Depth of hold: 9 ft 0 1/2 in (2.8 m)
- Sail plan: Ship
- Complement: 135
- Armament: Upper deck: 18 × 32-pounder carronades; QD: 6 × 18-pounder carronades; Fc: 2 × 6-pounder bow chasers + 2 × 18-pounder carronades

HMS Egeria was a Royal Navy 26-gun Cormorant-class ship-sloop launched at Bridport in 1807. During the Gunboat War she captured three privateers and several merchant vessels. After the Napoleonic Wars she continued on active service until 1825, after which she served as a receiving or accommodation ship. She was eventually broken up in 1865.

== Design ==
Sir William Rule and Sir John Henslow designed the Cormorant class as 16-gun ship-sloops. The first batch, ordered in 1793 was armed with 6-pounder naval long guns, but Egeria was one of the second batch, ordered in 1805, and carried 32-pounder carronades instead. She was rated as an 18-gun at first, but was later re-rated as a 26-gun sixth rate. Under the rating system of the day her number of guns could be largely nominal (in this case the number of long guns she would have carried had she been so-armed); the re-rating in February 1817 included her carronades in the total and did not involve any actual change to her armament.

== Service ==
In March 1808 Egeria was commissioned in Lieth, for the North Sea, and under Commander Fizowen Skinner. In May, Commander Lewis Hole replaced Skinner.

On 21 December 1808, Egeria captured the Danish 10-gun privateer Noesois, Giermund S. Holme, Master, off The Skaw and after a two-hour chase. She had a complement of 36 men, but had only 26 on board. She was one day out of Fredriksvern, without having taken anything. Neosis was offered for sale by auction on 29 March 1809 at Kingston upon Hull. (Note: Neosis was of 72 tons burthen. The notice of sale also gave her measurements.)

On 2 March 1809 Egeria captured the Danish 6-gun cutter Aalborg, after the packet ship Lord Nelson had already engaged her. Aalborg had a crew of 25 men and was bound to Norway with army clothing. On the same day Egeria also captured the Frederica, Emanuel, Isabella, and Margaretta. Lloyd's List reported that Egeria had captured the Danish vessels: Frederick, Alberg, Emanuel, Isabella, and Nancy. The British gathered these, and some more Danish vessels that other British vessels had captured, in Gothenburg. The captured vessels left Gothenburg on 23 March and by early April most had arrived at British ports.

On 24 July Egeria captured the Danish vessel Jagten Nicolini (or Jagten Nicolene). On 9 August Egeria recaptured the American ship Pompey.

Six months later, on 5 February 1810, Egeria captured the Danish cargo vessels Rodefiord, Til Fredjchead, and Sechs Wenner. On 23 October Egeria recaptured the Swedish brig Hoffnung.

On 12 March 1811, Clio, with Egeria in company, captured the Danish brig Krabbes Minde.

On 28 November 1811, Egeria captured the Christiansand. Then two days later, Egeria left Leith to search for vessels from an inbound Baltic convoy. Early the following day, about 70 miles off St Abb's Head, she engaged and captured the Danish privateer cutter Alvor, of 70 tons. Alvor was armed with 14 guns and had a crew of 38 men. She was 15 days out of North Bergen without having taken any prizes.

Egeria, together with the 74-gun Hero, the brig-sloop Grasshopper, and the hired armed ship Prince William left Gothenburg on 18 December 1811 as escorts to a convoy of 15 transports and a fleet of merchantmen, some 120 sail or more. Four or five days later Egeria and Prince William separated, together with the vessels going to the Humber and Scotland, including most of the merchant vessels. The transports and a handful of the merchantmen proceeded with Hero and Grasshopper. On 24 December Hero wrecked off Texel in a storm with the loss of all but 12 men of her 600 man crew. Grasshopper became trapped about a mile away where the Batavian Republic captured her.

On 17 February 1812, Egeria captured the Danish ship Maria Bonaventura. Then a little over one month later, on 27 March, she captured the Caroline, the Falken and two vessels both named Einighed, while Plover was in sight.

== Post-war ==
In December 1816 Captain Robert Rowley recommissioned her for the Newfoundland Station. In November 1819 Captain Henry Shiffner took command. She sailed back to England bringing with her many of the officers and men of Sir Francis Drake, which remained on station in a reduced state. Egeria was paid off in January 1820.

Captain John Toup Nicolas was captain of Egeria from 5 January 1820 until 1823, at first at Newfoundland. There he served as a "naval surrogate" (judge), trying over 1000 cases. In May 1822 he returned to England. Egeria first formed part of the royal squadron that escorted the king on his visit to Scotland. She then served on anti-smuggling patrol.

On 3 and 4 October 1822, Egeria, under the command of John Toup Nicolas, picked up at sea some spirits, tea and tobacco. In June 1823 she received a reward for the recovery. (Note: There is almost certainly an error in this reference. John Toup Nicolas was captain from 1820 to 1823, not in 1812. The probable year for the recovery is 1822, when Egeria was on anti-smuggling duties, and not 1812.)

In November Nicholas commanded a small squadron, consisting of Egeria, Nimrod, and the cutter Swan, on the Tyne where he subdued "a spirit of insubordination among the keelmen." He broke the strike by using the men of his squadron to man the keelboats and move the coal that had piled up out to the vessels that were waiting for it. Nicholas kept up the operation for six weeks. At one point Nicholas landed from his gig and seized six ringleaders who had been throwing stones and calling out insults. Eventually, he succeeded in talking with the strikers and agreed to take their complaints to the government himself if the grievances were justified. Shortly thereafter the strikers returned to work. The government, the merchants and the corporation of Newcastle all thanked him for this service.

Egeria was recommissioned in January 1823 under Captain Samuel Roberts, and she sailed for Newfoundland and the West Indies. She returned home and was paid off. Then, still under Roberts's command, she sailed for Cartagena and Mexico on 16 January 1825. She was carrying Colonel Campbell and Mr. Ward, His Majesty's commissioners, who had been tasked to take up their posts there and to negotiating treaties with Colombia and Mexico respectively. Egeria arrived at Vera Cruz on 11 March. She arrived back at Plymouth on 14 July 1825. She brought as passengers Mr. Morier, the previous British commissioner to Mexico, who brought news of the signing of a treaty between Mexico and the United Kingdom. She also brought two Mexican colonels, representatives of that government.

== Fate ==
Egeria became a receiving ship at Devonport and then at Plymouth in June 1826. The Admiralty lent her to the breakwater department at Plymouth on 16 December 1843. She then became an accommodation ship in December 1845 and police accommodation in April 1860. She was finally broken up in 1865.
