= Admiral Ferguson =

Admiral Ferguson may refer to:

- George Ferguson (Royal Navy officer) (1788–1867), British Royal Navy admiral
- John Macpherson Ferguson (1783–1855), British Royal Navy rear admiral
- Mark E. Ferguson III (born 1956), U.S. Navy admiral

== See also ==
- James Fergusson (Royal Navy officer) (1871–1942), British Royal Navy admiral
