= HMS Nimrod (1812) =

British Navy vessel

History

United Kingdom
- Name: HMS Nimrod
- Ordered: 26 September 1811
- Builder: Jabez Bayley, Ipswich
- Laid down: November 1811
- Launched: 25 May 1812
- Fate: Sold 1827

United Kingdom
- Owner: Various
- Port of registry: London; Liverpool
- Acquired: 1827 by purchase
- Fate: No longer listed in Lloyd's Register (LR) after 1851

General characteristics
- Class & type: Cruizer-class brig-sloop
- Tons burthen: 38422/94, or 369; 469 after 1827 lengthening (bm)
- Length: 100 ft 0 in (30.5 m) (overall); 77 ft 2 3/4 in (23.5 m) (keel)
- Beam: 30 ft 7 in (9.3 m)
- Depth of hold: 12 ft 10 in (3.91 m)
- Propulsion: Sails
- Sail plan: Brig
- Complement: 121
- Armament: 16 × 32-pounder carronades; 2 × 6-pounder chase guns

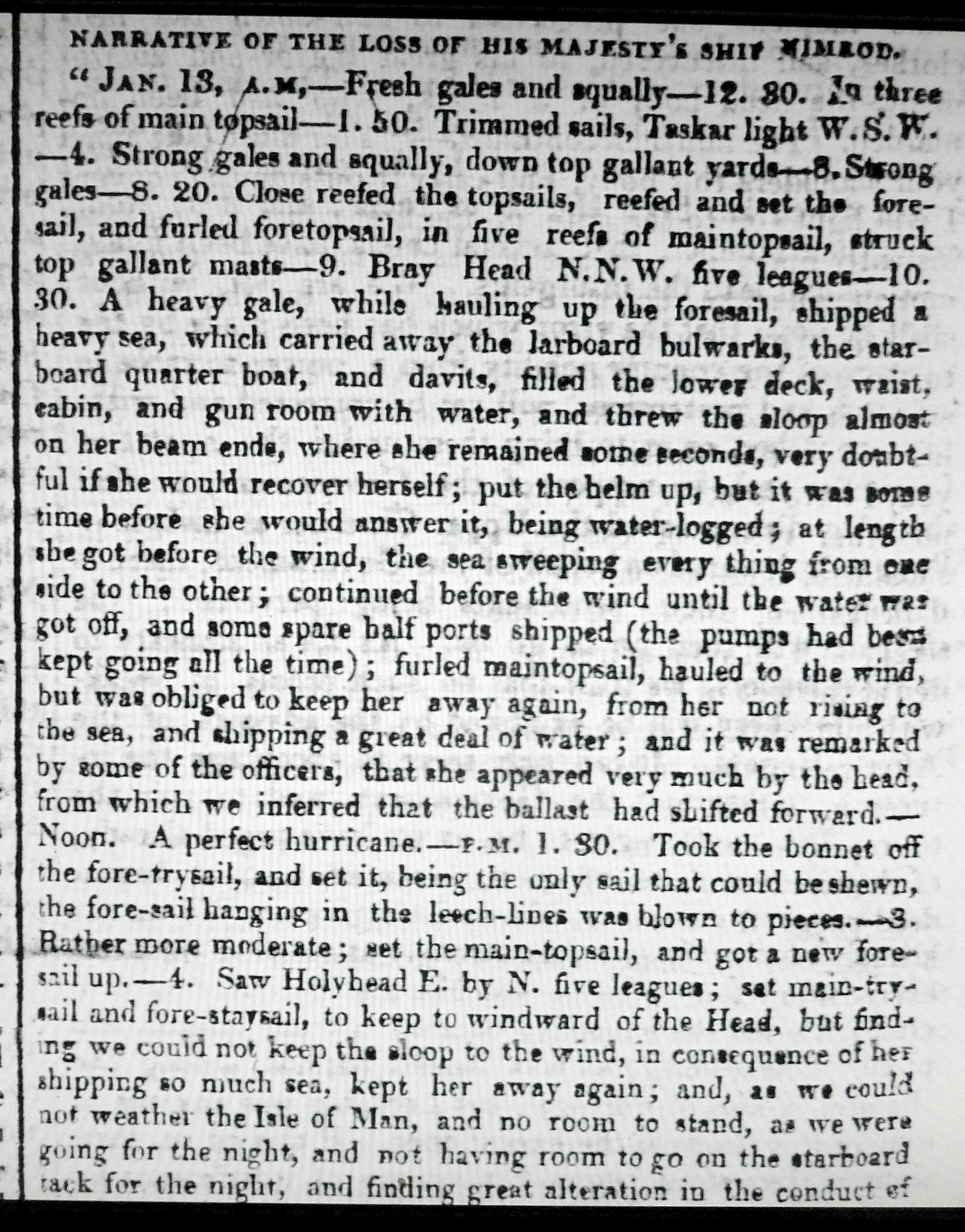
Log Of HMS Nimrod

HMS Nimrod was a brig-sloop of the British Royal Navy, launched in 1812. She spent her war years in North American waters, where she captured one small privateer, assisted in the capture of another, and captured or destroyed some 50 American vessels. After the war she captured smugglers and assisted the civil authorities in maintaining order in Tyne. She was wrecked in 1827 and so damaged that the Navy decided she was not worth repairing. A private ship-owner purchased Nimrod and repaired her. She then went on to spend some 20 years trading between Britain and Charleston, the Mediterranean, Australia, and India. She was last listed in 1851.

== HMS Nimrod ==
=== War of 1812 ===
Commander Nathaniel Mitchel commissioned Nimrod in August 1812. He then sailed her for North America on 22 September. On 4 January 1813 Nimrod was at 25°45′N 56°14′W while sailing from Newfoundland to Bermuda. She had parted from her convoy in bad weather.

On 23 January Nimrod left Barbados with the trade for St Vincents, Grenada, and Jamaica.

On 12 or 15 March 1813, Nimrod captured the American "private ship of war" Defiance off Morant Bay, Jamaica, and sent her into Port Royal, Jamaica. Defiance, of three guns and 80 men, was under the command of a Frenchman. (Note: Defiance, of 75 tons (bm), was armed with two guns and had a crew of 80 men under the command of Captain J.P. Chazel. She was registered out of New York and Charleston. In the engagement Nimrod fired 30 broadsides before Defiance struck. Defiance had three men killed and 12 wounded, including Chazel, slightly. Chazel recuperated in Jamaica and then returned to Charleston where he took command of the privateer schooner Saucy Jack.) (Note: A first-class share of the head money was worth £60 17s; a sixth-class share, that of an ordinary seaman, was worth 18s.)

Maidstone, Sylph, and Nimrod captured the brig Victor, of 52½ tons (bm), Swedish lasts, Carl Fred Hallberger, master, on 13 May. She had been sailing from Haiti to New London with 140 hogsheads (hhds) of sugar.

On 17 July Maidstone, with Poictiers and Nimrod in company, captured the American privateer Yorktown, of 20 guns and 140 men, after a four-hour chase. Yorktown, under Captain T. W. Story, had taken 11 prizes before Maidstone captured her. The British sent Yorktown and her crew into Halifax.

Nimrod recaptured the sloop Mary, F. Glawson, master, on 27 July. Mary went into Halifax. Four days later Nimrod recaptured the sloop William & Ann, of 77 tons (bm), W. Eadie, master. William and Mary had been sailing from Scotland to Ireland with a cargo of coals and glass when captured.

On 11 August, Nimrod captured the ship Republican, A. Baupen, master, which was sailing from New York to Port-au-Prince. She was carrying provisions, lumber, tobacco, fruit and dry goods. Nimrod sent her into Halifax.

Poictiers, in company with Maidstone and Nimrod, captured several vessels.

- 13 August: brig Anna, of 125 tons, Diego Martinez, master, sailing from Newhaven to La Guaira. (Note: Anna was carrying 870 bbls. flour, 40 half bbls. beef. 142 firkins lard, 76 firkins butter, 110 boxes soap, and 30 bbls. gin.) (Note: A first-class share of the prize money was worth £129 6¼d; a sixth-class share was worth £1 7d.)
- 18 August: ship Manchester. Manchester was a Falmouth packet brig, R. Elphinstone, master, and represented a recapture. Manchester, of 180 tons (bm) and 16 guns, had been a prize to the American privateer Yorktown. (Note: Records of the Falmouth packets show Manchester leaving Falmouth on 15 June, and being captured on 25 June. She was recaptured on 18 July, i.e., the day after the recapture of Yorktown, not 18 August, and arrived at Halifax on 19 July. She left there on 12 August, and arrived back at Falmouth on 4 September.) The squadron also recaptured Lavinia, which Yorktown had captured as Lavinia, of Greenock, had been sailing from Newfoundland to Lisbon.

Nimrod and Albion captured the ship Chili, 260 tons, R. Gardner, master, of Nantucket, on 2, or 7 December. Chili was returning from a whaling voyage with 500 barrels of sperm oil. Nimrod put 500 barrels of flour on her, flour that Nimrod had earlier taken out of a sloop. Chili and Nimrod arrived at Halifax on 13 December, reportedly after Nimrod had cut her out of Tarpaulin Bay, now known as Tarpaulin Cove. A later report has Chili carrying 1210 barrels of sperm oil. (Note: American records give Chili a burthen of 293 tons. They also report 1240 barrels of whale oil.)

On 13 December, Nimrod captured the sloop Manhatton, D. Gladding, master.

Nimrod bombarded the town of Falmouth, Massachusetts, on 29 January 1814.

Nimrod's boats destroyed a Swedish brig of unknown name on 31 May in Eastern River, Rhode Island, now known as the Sakonett River.

On 2 June, the schooner USRC Vigilant towed into Newport, Rhode Island, the brig Little Francis. Little Francis had been sailing from St Barts with molasses and sugar when she encountered Nimrod. Nimrod had run Little Francis on shore, and a landing party had set fire to her. However, the crew had refloated her, enabling Vigilant to take her under tow. On 3 June Edmond arrived at Halifax after Nimrod ordered her off as Edmond was sailing from St Bartholomew's to America.

On 4 June, Nimrod captured the brig Francisca De Paula, of 90 tons (bm), Frederica Arenos, master. She had been sailing from Havana to Boston with 145 hhds of molasses. Two days after that, on 6 June, Nimrod captured the brig Herculaneum, of 111 tons, Andrew Smith, master. She had been sailing from Haiti to Boston or Madeira with 19801 gallons of molasses and 19 hhds of sugar.

Commander George Hilton assumed command on 7 June 1814.

On 13 June, Nimrod bombarded Fairhaven, Massachusetts, after the townspeople refused to surrender some cannons. After exchanging fire with the local militia dug in at Fort Phoenix, Nimrod disengaged and sailed off.

In June Captain Charles Paget, in Superb, received intelligence that two new vessels were lying at Wareham, Massachusetts, at the head of Buzzard's Bay, as well as some older ones. He immediately dispatched Nimrod through Quick's Hole with the boats from Superb and two from Nimrod to destroy them. The boats destroyed 17 vessels (accounting in all for 2522 tons (bm)), and a cotton manufactory that had been recently built at great expense, was full of stores worth some half-a-million dollars, and belonged to a company of 60 Boston merchants. The British then took several locals hostage so that they might withdraw through the narrow waters during daylight without the militia firing on them. The vessels destroyed were:

- Ship Fair Trader, of 444 tons, quite new, built for a letter of marque, and pierced for 18 12-pounder guns.
- Brig Independent, of 300 tons, on the stocks, built for a privateer, and pierced for 14 guns, ready for launching.
- Schooner Fancy, of 250 tons, belonging to Falmouth, new vessel.
- Schooner Elizabeth, of 230 tons, belonging to Falmouth, new vessel.
- Schooner Nancy, of 230 tons, belonging to Falmouth, hew vessel.
- Sloop Wilmington, of 150 tons, built in 1809.
- Schooner Industry, of 136 tons, built in 1809.
- Schooner Argus, of 136 tons, built in 1812.
- Brig William Richmond, of 135 tons, built in 1808.
- Schooner New States, of 96 tons, built in 1800.
- Sloop Paragon, of 70 tons, 1811.
- Sloop, name unknown, of 70 tons, ready for launching.
- Sloop William, of 60 tons, built in 1801.
- Sloop Thomas, of 60 tons, not known when built.
- Sloop William Lucy, of 50 tons, new, never at sea.
- Sloop Experiment, of 60 tons, not known when built.
- Sloop Friendship, of 45 tons, built in 1805.

Between 6 August and 9 October, Nimrod captured 38 schooners and sloops. On 14 September Nimrod captured the schooner Maria, which had been sailing from Newport, Rhode Island, to New York with a cargo of salt, fish and oil, and sent her into Halifax.

Then on 8 December, Nimrod recaptured the brig Lady Prevost, of 146 tons (bm), Alex Strang, master. When the privateer Yankee had captured her, Lady Prevost had been sailing from Lisbon to St. John's, Newfoundland, with a cargo of salt. Lady Prevost arrived at Halifax on 16 December.

On 21 January 1815 Funchal arrived at Bermuda. Nimrod had detained Funchal as she was sailing from New York to Lisbon. However, on 10 February Nimrod was at 33°23′N 20°5′W having been caught in a gale and having had to throw all her guns overboard to stay afloat.

=== Post-war ===
Commander John Macpherson Ferguson commissioned Nimrod and sailed her to the Leith station in August 1815. It had taken some nine months for Nimrod and the other vessels commissioned at Portsmouth for peace service to obtain full crews.

Commander John Gedge replaced Ferguson when Ferguson received promotion to post captain on 1 January 1817. Commander John Dalling replaced Gedge on 7 January 1817. Lieutenant Charles Nelson received promotion to commander and took command on 25 June 1819. Oh her he captured two smugglers off the coast of Holland.

On 14 August 1820, Nimrod captured the smuggling lugger Mars, which resulted in substantial prize money. (Note: A first-class share was worth £1261 1s 9d; a sixth-class share was worth £20 15s 9d.) Then on 4 October 1821 Nimrod captured the American schooner Vulture. (Note: A first-class share was worth £97 1s 10½d; a sixth-class share was worth £1 8s 8¼d.) Nelson left Nimrod in June 1822.

Commander William Rochfort assumed command on 4 July 1822 on the Leith station. In November he sailed to the Port of Tyne to support the civil authorities who faced a strike by the keelmen against their employers. He was briefly the sole naval officer present. Then Captain John Toup Nicholas arrived in Egeria, and took command of a small squadron consisting of Egeria, Nimrod, and the cutter Swan. Nicholas subdued "a spirit of insubordination among the keelmen." He broke the strike by using the men of his squadron to man the keelboats and move out to the vessels that were waiting for it the coal that had piled up. Nicholas kept up the operation for six weeks. Eventually, Nicholas succeeded in talking with the strikers and agreed to take their complaints to the government himself if the grievances were justified. Shortly thereafter the strikers returned to work. The government, the merchants, and the corporation of Newcastle all thanked him for this service. Also, the local authorities at a public meeting voted a grant to Nimrod's crew a hundred guineas.

Next, Rochfort assumed command of a squadron consisting of two naval and four Revenue vessels engaged in suppressing smuggling on the west coast of Scotland. Then in November 1823 he proceeded on a mission up the river Garonne as far as Pauillac, and "by his firmness and moderation overcame many obstacles thrown in his way by the French authorities."

He subsequently cruised on the Cork station. On 15 April 1825 one of Nimrod's boat upset in Belfast Lough, drowning Lieutenant James Everard and three men.

Rochfort paid-off Nimrod on 13 October 1825. His crew took the opportunity to present him with a sword "as a testimony of their respect and esteem." Nimrod then transferred to Cork.

Commander Samuel Sparshott assumed command 13 September 1826.

== Loss and disposal ==
Nimrod sailed from Cork on 13 January 1827 for the Clyde. A gale developed during the night that damaged her and caused her to take on water. As she approached Anglesey Sparshott decided to take refuge at Holyhead. She was able to get into the harbour and anchor. The wind changed direction and she lost her anchor and the wind and sea drove her onto a ridge of rocks. By midnight of 14 January 1827 it became possible to get a line to shore and get the crew of 121 off her. Over the next few days her stores were landed and on 12 February 1827 the steamer Harlequin was able to pull her off the rocks. The Royal Navy judged her not worth repairing. She was sold to Rowland Robert & Co. on 22 February 1827 for £510. The subsequent court martial acquitted Sparshott, his officers, and men of her loss.

== Merchantman ==
Nimrod first appears in LR for 1828 after having been lengthened and raised, and having undergone a large repair. In 1841, under the command of Captain Manning, she transported assisted emigrants from Liverpool to Port Phillip (Melbourne), and Sydney. She left Liverpool on 13 October 1840 with 34 passengers in Intermediate, and 21 in Steerage. She was also carrying cargo. She arrived at Melbourne on 17 February. On 4 March she sailed for Sydney, where she arrived on 10 March. Nimrod was last listed in 1851 with Bowers, master, A. Taylor, owner, but at Liverpool and without a trade.

Year	Master	Owner	Home port	Trade
1829	Hadgley; Atkins	Fain & Co.		Liverpool-Charleston
1830	R. Atkins	Fair & Co.		Liverpool-Charleston
1831	Atkins	Green & Co.		Liverpool
1832	Atkins	Green & Co.		Liverpool
1833	R. Atkins	Green & Co.		Liverpool-New York
1834	R. Atkins	Taylor & Co.	Liverpool	Liverpool-Charleston
1835	R. Atkins	Taylor & Co.	Liverpool	Liverpool-Charleston
1839	Manning	Taylor & Co.	Liverpool	Liverpool
1840	Manning	Taylor & Co.	Liverpool	Liverpool-Sydney
1845	Atkins	Taylor	Liverpool	Liverpool-Sydney
1846	Atkins	Taylor & Co.	Liverpool	Liverpool-Sydney; London-Bombay
1847	Atkins	Taylor & Co.	Liverpool	London-Bombay
1848	R. Atkins	A. Taylor	Liverpool	Liverpool-Mediterranean
1850	R. Atkins	A. Taylor	Liverpool	London-Bombay
