= Prince William (1788 ship) =

History

Great Britain
- Name: Prince William
- Builder: William Rowe, St Peter's, Newcastle
- Launched: 1788
- Fate: Last mentioned in 1812.

General characteristics
- Tons burthen: 306, or 30737/94, or 350 (bm)
- Armament: 1801: 14 × 24-pounder carronades; 1804: 4 × 4-pounder guns; 14 × 24-pounder carronades

Prince William was built in Newcastle in 1788. She then traded between England and the Baltic. The Royal Navy first hired her in 1797. His Majesty's hired armed ship Prince William served on two contracts, one during the French Revolutionary Wars and one during the Napoleonic Wars. The Admiralty returned her to her owners at the end of each contract.

== Merchantman ==
Prince William first appeared in Lloyd's Register (LR) in 1789. That volume showed her burthen as 350 tons; by 1791, the burthen had been corrected to 306 tons. (There is no readily accessible online volume for 1788).

Year	Master	Owner	Trade	Source
1789	W.Clark; M.Rowe	Captain & Co. M.Rowe & Co.	Portsmouth–Memel	LR
1791	W.Clark	M.Rowe & Co.	London−Stettin	LR
1793	W.Clark; J.Humble	M.Rowe & Co.	Portsmouth–Memel	LR
1794	J.Humble; Nicholson	M.Rowe & Co.	Portsmouth–Memel	LR
1797	Nicholson	M.Rowe & Co.	Petersburg–Portsmouth	LR

Britain's trade provided a lucrative target for French privateers so the Admiralty hired a number of merchant vessels, armed them, and then used them for convoy escort duties.

== First contract (1797–1801) ==
Prince William served from 24 April 1797, to 26 November 1801. Her captain was Commander Thomas Whitwronge Clayton, her master was W. Nicholson, and she served on the North Sea station.

In 1797, Prince William, under Clayton's command, recaptured London Packet, of Aberdeen. At the time Prince William was employed in convoying vessels. The French privateer Jason had captured London Packet in the North Sea off Buchan Ness, Aberdeenshire, on 11 September 1797. She had been on a voyage from Arkhangelsk, Russia to Portsmouth. (Note: HMS Jalouse captured the French privateer Jason, of 14 guns and 52 men, on 14 February 1799 off the Texel. Jason operated out of Dunkirk.) (Note: French sources provide the following information on Jason. She was a privateer commissioned in Dunkirk in 1797. On her first cruise in 1797 until November she was under the command of Pierre-François Sagot, with 51 men and 14 guns. On her second cruise, in 1798 she was under the command of a J.-J. (Jean-Jacques?) Seille, with 58 men an 14 guns. For her third, and last cruise in 1799, she was under the command of Charles-Adrien Parquet until HMS Jalouse captured her in March.)

On 24 September 1799 Prince William was part of a small squadron of shallow-draft vessels that Admiral Mitchell, in Babet, took to the Enkhuizen road to meet with supporters of the House of Orange at Medemblik. Clayton received promotion to post captain on 26 December 1799.

Lieutenant Thomas Richbell, of Centaur, was promoted to Commander on 26 December 1799, and was given the command of Prince William, on the Shields station.

On 26 October 1801, it was announced at Hull that the hired armed ships Prince William, Good Design, and Pomona were to be paid off at Newcastle following the signing of a peace treaty at Amiens; hostilities officially had ceased on 22 October. The Admiralty returned Prince William to her owners on 21 November.

On 29 April 1802, Richbell received promotion to post captain. An amateur artist, Captain Richbell drew a picture, A view of Scarborough with His Majesty's armed ship Prince William, anchoring in a fresh gale that in 1803 he exhibited at the Royal Academy of Arts.

Year	Master	Owner	Trade	Source & notes
1802	Nicholson	Clark & Co.	Newcastle transport Newcastle–Copenhagen	Register of Shipping (RS)
1804	S.Wiggins	Clark & Co.	Newcastle–Copenhagen	RS; thorough repair 1802 & damage and through repairs 1803

In November 1802 Lloyd's List reported that Prince William, Wiggins, master, had gotten on shore at Memel but was expected to be gotten off.

== Second contract (1804–1812) ==
Prince William served from 3 May 1804, to 2 November 1812.

A report from Hull dated 24 September 1804, stated that Captain John Waller of the Sea Fencibles had been appointed to command Prince William. Captain Mackay was to move from Prince William to His Majesty's armed ship Royalist, then in Hull Roads. Commander John Waller commissioned HMS Serpent in January 1805, and so must have left Prince William within months of his appointment to her. (Note: Serpent foundered with all hands in September 1806, while on the Jamaica Station)

On 1 December 1806, Prince William arrived at Grimsby with a convoy from the Elbe. One of the vessels was Traveller, which had left the convoy near The Skaw. Prince William had also captured six prizes with goods from Hamburg and Bordeaux.

On 23 August 1807, Prince William was under the command of Captain Andrew Mott when she captured the St. Jurgen. St Sorgen, Joryensen, master, was a Danish ship carrying wine and brandy. In October Prince William detained St George, Jorgenson, master, which was carrying wine and brandy.

On 19 June 1810, Prince William, still under Mott's command, captured the Danish privateer Swalen, Hermansen, master.

Prince William, together with the 74-gun Hero, the ship-sloop Egeria, and the brig-sloop Grasshopper left Gothenburg on 18 December 1811 as escorts to a convoy of 15 transports and a fleet of merchantmen, some 120 sail or more. Four or five days later Egeria and Prince William separated, together with the vessels going to the Humber and Scotland, including most of the merchant vessels. The transports and a handful of the merchantmen proceeded with Hero and Grasshopper. On 24 December, Hero wrecked off Texel in a storm with the loss of all but 12 men of her 600-man crew. Grasshopper became trapped about a mile away and was forced to strike to the Batavian Republic.

== Fate ==
On 19 April 1812, the armed ship Prince William sailed from Plymouth with a convoy for the Downs. Thereafter she disappears from online sources. Commander Andrew Mott was promoted to post captain in August 1812.
