= Severn (1806 ship) =

UK merchant ship 1806–1838

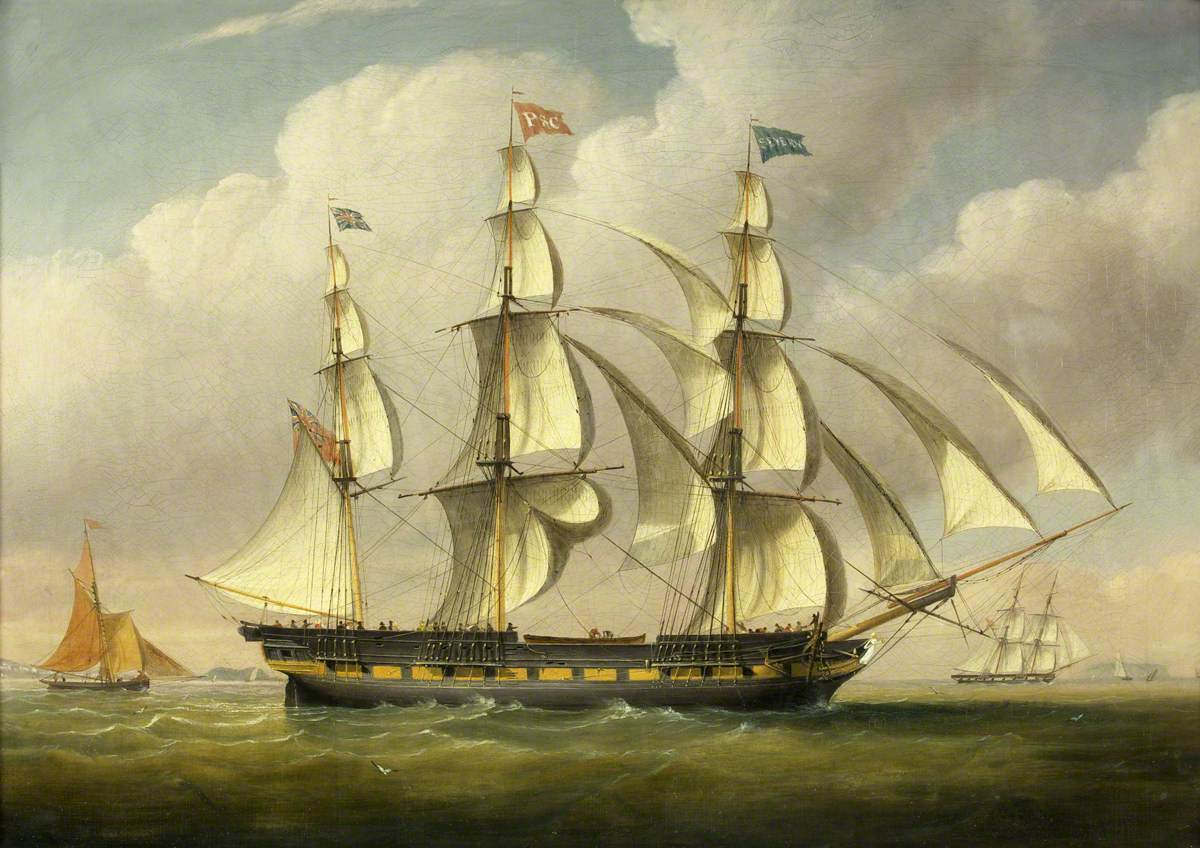
- Severn, c.1835; Joseph Walter (1783–1856), Bristol Museum & Art Gallery

History

United Kingdom
- Name: Severn
- Namesake: River Severn
- Builder: Hilhouse, Sons and Co., Bristol, Gloucestershire
- Launched: 1806
- Fate: Abandoned at sea late 1838

General characteristics
- Tons burthen: 478, or 47850/94 (bm)
- Length: 113 ft 5 in (34.6 m)
- Beam: 31 ft 6 in (9.6 m)
- Propulsion: Sail
- Sail plan: Ship-rigged; later barque
- Complement: 30
- Armament: 12 × 9&4-pounder guns
- Notes: Two decks, three masts, square stem, quarter galleries, and figure head

Severn was launched at Bristol in 1806. She spent most of her career as a West Indiaman. In 1813 she ran down and sank another merchantman. In late 1838 Severn's crew had to abandon her in the Atlantic in a sinking condition.

== Career ==
Severn first appeared in Lloyd's Register (LR) in 1806.

Year	Master	Owner	Trade	Notes and source
1806	Etheridge	Protheroe	Bristol–Jamaica	Lloyd's Register (LR; 1806)

Captain Richard Drew acquired a letter of marque on 5 April 1810.

On 11 February 1813 Severn ran down and sank Wargrave. HMS Cressy rescued Wargrave's crew. Wargrave, Ostler, master, was on a voyage from Dublin to Surinam. (Note: Wargrave, of 175 tons (bm), had been launched in Denmark in 1801.)

Year	Master	Owner	Trade	Notes and source
1810	J. Drew	R. Claxton	Bristol–Nevis	LR
1815	J. Arew	R. Claxton	Bristol–Nevis	LR
1820	E.J. Power	R. Claxton	Bristol–Nevis	Good repair in 1815; LR
1825	Christopher Claxton	R. Claxton	Bristol–Nevis	Good repair in 1815 & small repair 1821; LR
1830	F. Foster	J. Irvine	Bristol–Trinidad	Thorough repair in 1828; LR
1835	Brown	J.Irving	Bristol–Quebec	LR
1838	Brown	J.Irving	Bristol–New York	Damages repaired in 1836 and small repairs in 1837; LR

Other masters: Christopher Claxton; Gabriel Forster (9 Sept. 1825); Richard Radford (3 Feb. 1831); Thomas Sandon (24 Oct. 1831); Adam Dixon (25 July 1833 (London)); Charles Timothy Stewart (25 Aug. 1834 (London)); Thomas Brown (26 Mar. 1835); Charles Skirling (29 Sept. 1834); Edward Purse (1 May 1837); and William Johns (30 August 1838).

On 10 December 1833 Captain Adam Dixon was sailing by the Chagos Archipelago when he sighted an uncharted island or islands at 5°30′N 72°24′E that he named Severn Island.

== Fate ==
In late 1838 her crew abandoned Severn in the Atlantic Ocean at 48°N 31°W as she had 16 feet of water in her hold. She was on a voyage from Miramichi, New Brunswick, to Bristol. Russell, of New York, which was sailing from New Orleans to Havre, rescued Severn's crew.
