= Adam Ferguson (British Army officer) =

Sir Adam Ferguson
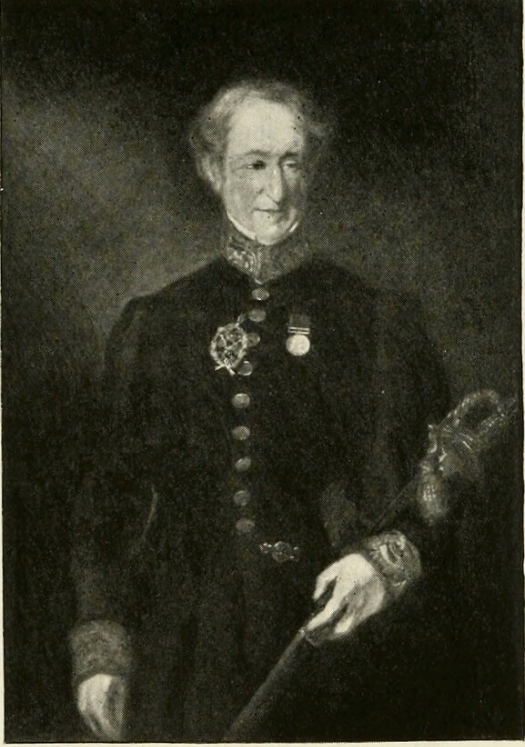
- Sir Adam Ferguson wearing his Peninsular war medal with Salamanca clasp.
- Born: 21 December 1770
- Died: 23 December 1854 (aged 84)
- Military career
- Rank: Captain

Sir Adam Ferguson (1770–1854) was a Scottish soldier, gentleman farmer and deputy keeper of the regalia in Scotland.

== Life ==
Ferguson was born on 21 December 1770, the first son of Professor Adam Ferguson and his wife Catherine Burnett niece to Joseph Black. He was elder brother to Captain Joseph Ferguson of the 78th foot, Colonel James Ferguson of the HEIC 23rd Native Infantry Bengal Army, Admiral John McPherson Ferguson and his three sisters Isabel, Mary and Margaret.

== Early life ==
Ferguson is recorded attending the Royal High School, Edinburgh in 1777. At both the Royal High School and the University of Edinburgh he was one of the companions of Walter Scott. This friendship with Scott developed into a strong bond lasting until Scott's death in 1832. An example: "Of all Scott's bosom-cronies the man of quickest, lightest, most spontaneous fun, of most triumphant mimicry, and of gentlest, happiest temper, was, by universal testimony, Sir Adam Ferguson". Another example described in Scott's memoirs, is his letter to Lord Montagu, the 4th Duke of Buccleuch in 1819 recommending Ferguson as personal secretary for the Duke's impending visit to Lisbon. He was also one of the nineteen original members of the society, 'called by way of excellence, "The Club"' formed in 1788 in Carrubbers Close, (a club formed for the consumption of oysters, claret and rum punch), among the members of which, from the accident of a Newhaven fisherman mistaking him for a brother of the craft, he obtained the cognomen of Linton. It was in company with Ferguson that Scott in 1793 first visited the scenes in Perthshire on the highland border which he afterwards described in his poems and romances. In 1797 Ferguson accompanied Scott to the Lake District and whilst staying at Gilsland, one evening, both dressed up in their regimental uniform of The Royal Edinburgh Volunteers which they had recently joined, and met Scott's future wife Charlotte Carpenter. By joining The Volunteers he began to shape his future military life. Between 1803 and 1806 he was the collector of the Widows Fund for the Society of Writers to His Majesty's Signet.

== Army Service ==
In the early 1800s Ferguson entered the army; he was appointed an ensign on 1 December 1805 in the 2nd battalion 21st Regiment of Foot serving in Scotland and Ireland. He was appointed a lieutenant on 21 October 1806 in the 2nd battalion 34th Regiment serving in Jersey. He was promoted to captain in the 2nd battalion 58th Regiment in February 1808 and served in Jersey until embarking for Portugal where he arrived on 2 July 1809. He served in the Peninsular War under the 1st Duke of Wellington. Ferguson commanded a company of some 58 men from the 2nd Battalion, of the 58th Regiment of Foot. The battalion comprising nine companies and were initially based in Lisbon as a protection force. The battalion was headquartered at Vila Nova and then moved northwards in autumn 1810 to the Lines of Torres Vedras. It was whilst protecting "The Lines" he describes in a letter to Scott receiving a copy of The Lady of the Lake and reading Canto Vi to his soldiers whilst under cannon fire. In April 1812 the regiment was involved in the Battle of Salamanca. For his actions he later received the Salamanca bar on his Peninsular war medal. He was taken prisoner during Wellington's retreat from Burgos in autumn 1812, held prisoner in a town in the Auvergne, and was not released till the peace of 1814. As a prisoner of the Napoleonic Army, despite suffering some hardships, he was accorded some favour from Napoleon for the sake of his father's first cousin Joseph Black M.D. On 8 October 1816 he went on half-pay and appointed to the 101st Regiment on disbandment.

== Life with Sir Walter Scott ==
In the summer of 1817 Ferguson accompanied Scott in an excursion to the Lennox, with the main aim of visiting Rob Roy's cave at the head of Loch Lomond. In the following year he and his sisters took up their residence in the mansion-house of Toftfield, which Scott had recently purchased, and on which, at the ladies' request, he bestowed the name of Huntlyburn. On 19 August 1818 Ferguson, mainly through the exertions of Scott, was appointed keeper of the Scottish Regalia, which then had recently been re-discovered. About this time, Ferguson commissioned Sir David Wilkie to paint the Scott family resulting in the painting The Abbotsford Family in which Scott and his family are represented as a group of peasants and Ferguson as a gamekeeper or poacher. Ferguson is seen standing to the right of Scott with the feather in his cap.

In 1819 Ferguson, in the capacity of secretary, accompanied Scott's friend, Charles Montagu Scott, 4th Duke of Buccleuch, then in declining health, to Lisbon. In 1821 he married the widow of George Lyon of London, and daughter of John Stewart of Stenton, Perthshire. They lived at Gattonside House between 1821 and 1824. On the occasion of the visit of King George IV to Scotland he was knighted at Hopetoun House with Henry Raeburn on 29 August 1822. They later return to Huntlyburn and are living there from around 1826 onwards.

== Later life ==
Between 1847 and 1852 Ferguson lived at 27 George Square, Edinburgh they are depicted in a painting executed by David Cooke Gibson held in the Scottish National Gallery.

He died on 25 December 1854. He was buried on 1 January 1855 in the now sealed south-west section of Greyfriars Kirkyard known as the Covenanter's Prison with his wife Margaret Stewart of Stenton.

== Paintings and Memorial ==
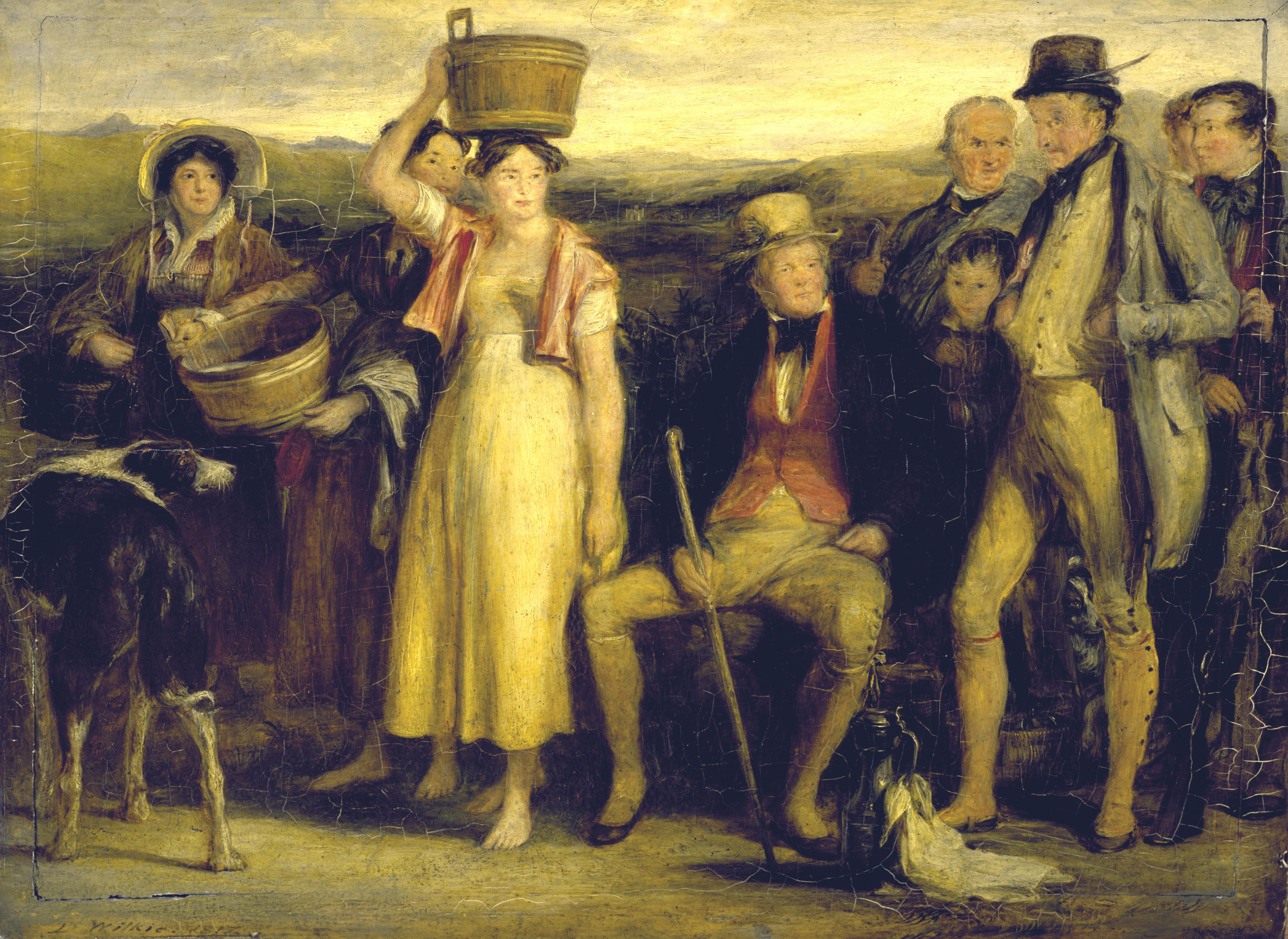
The Abbotsford Family 1817, Ferguson is standing with the feather in his cap. Scott is seated in the centre.

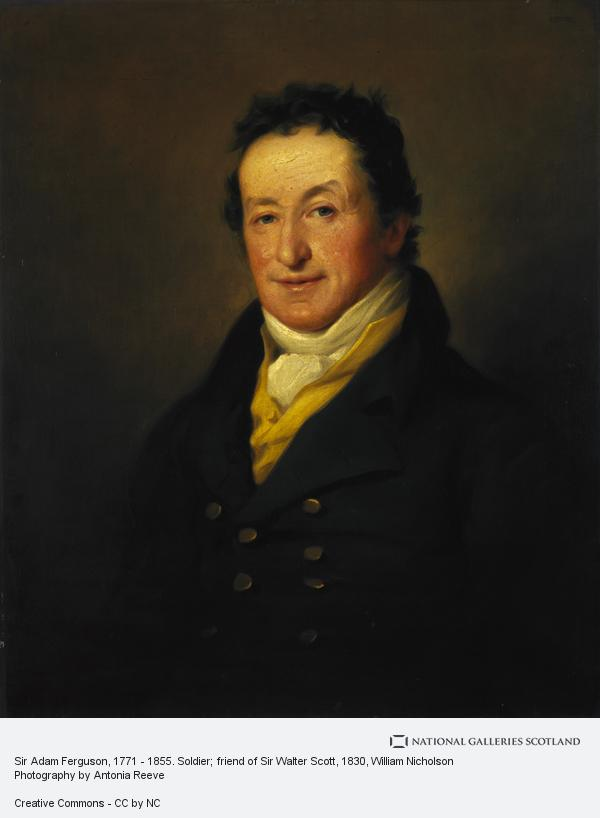
Sir Adam Ferguson by William Nicholson circa 1830, National Galleries of Scotland

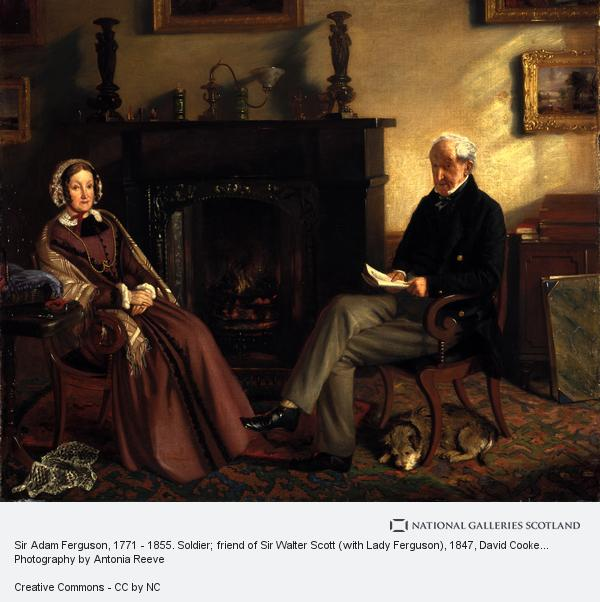
Sir Adam and Lady Margaret, 27 George Square, Edinburgh 1847-52 by David Cooke Gibson, National Galleries of Scotland

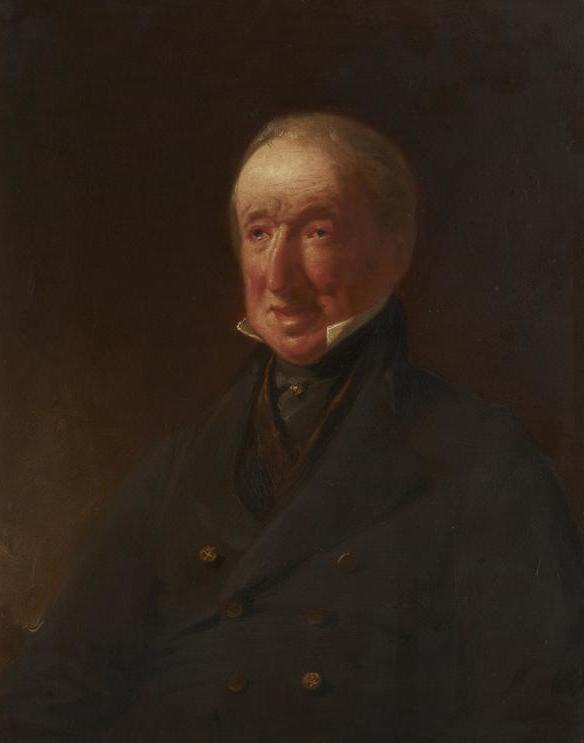
Oil Painting circa 1849 National Galleries of Scotland

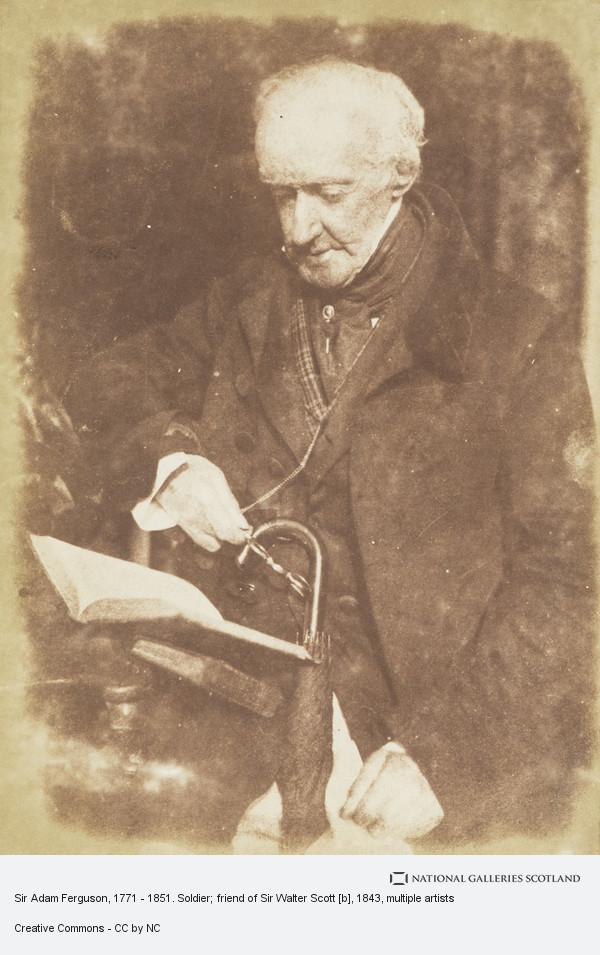
Calotype print circa 1847, National Galleries of Scotland

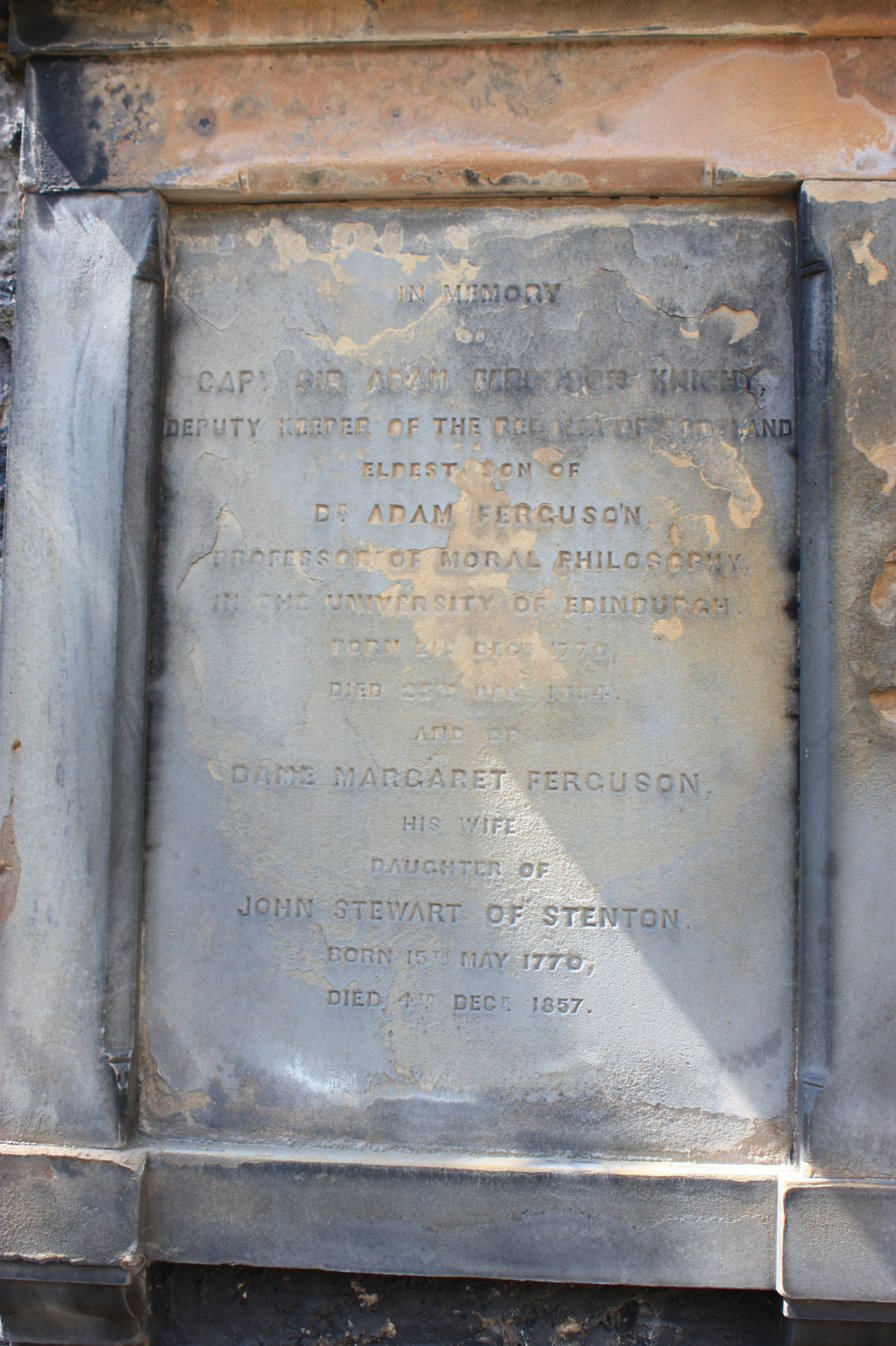
The grave of Sir Adam Ferguson, Greyfriars Kirkyard

== See also ==
- John Macpherson Ferguson
- The Glasgow Herald Obituary 29 Dec 1854 page 4.

== Note ==
The information citing the regiments that he served with is taken from primary sources shown. This differs from the 19th century secondary source biographers and writers who no doubt looked at the mid 19th century Army list which only list the 101st regiment; this was the final regiment he was appointed to on half pay. The 101st regiment did not serve in the Peninsular: they were posted to Jamaica, but also spent a short time in Jersey at the same time as Ferguson was working as secretary to the lieutenant governor General Sir George Don in St Helier. Ferguson describes the parties and dark eyed lassies of the island to Scott in his letters.

Current photographs of Ferguson's homes close to Abbotsford House where Scott lived:

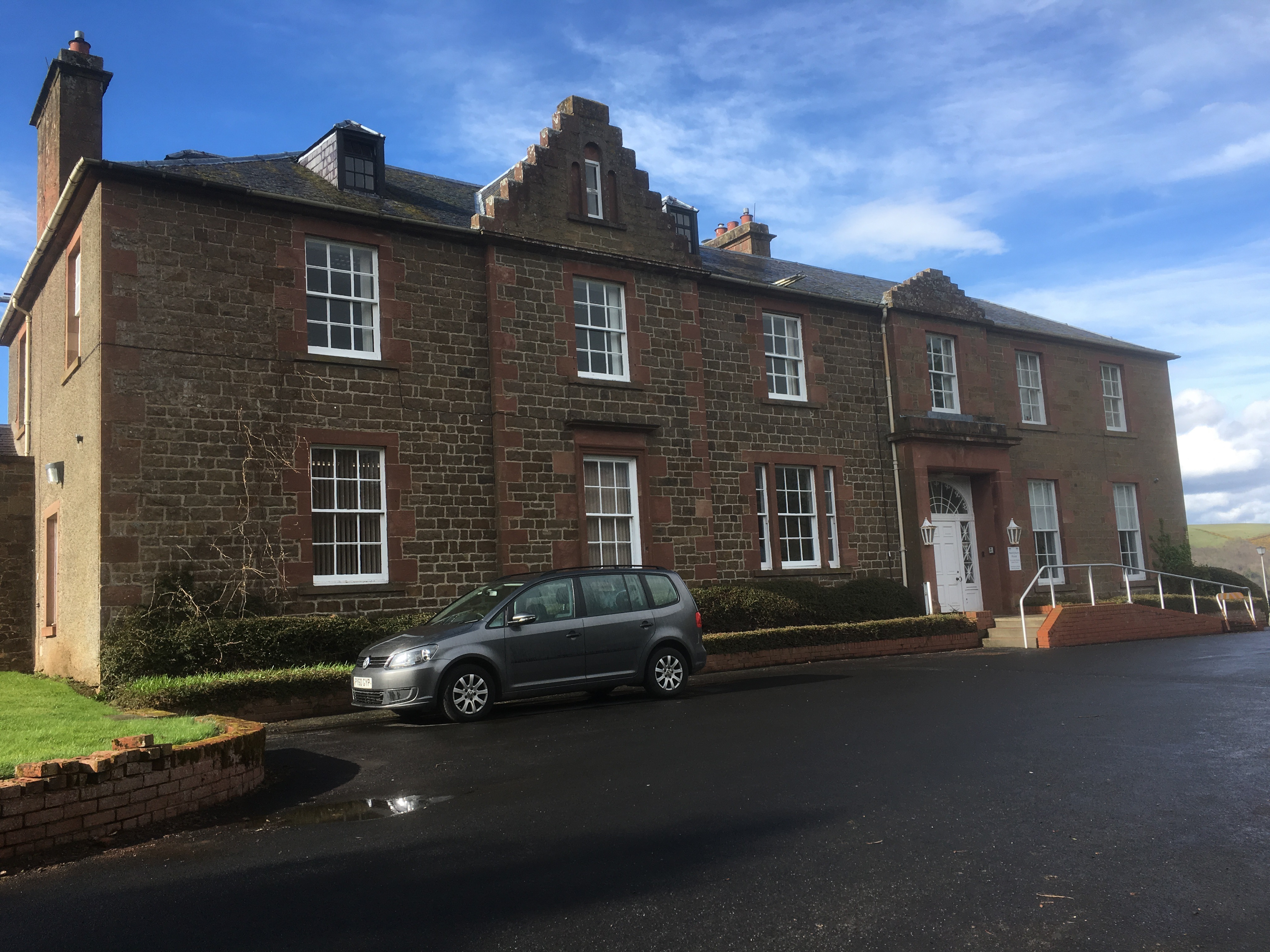
Huntlyburn House

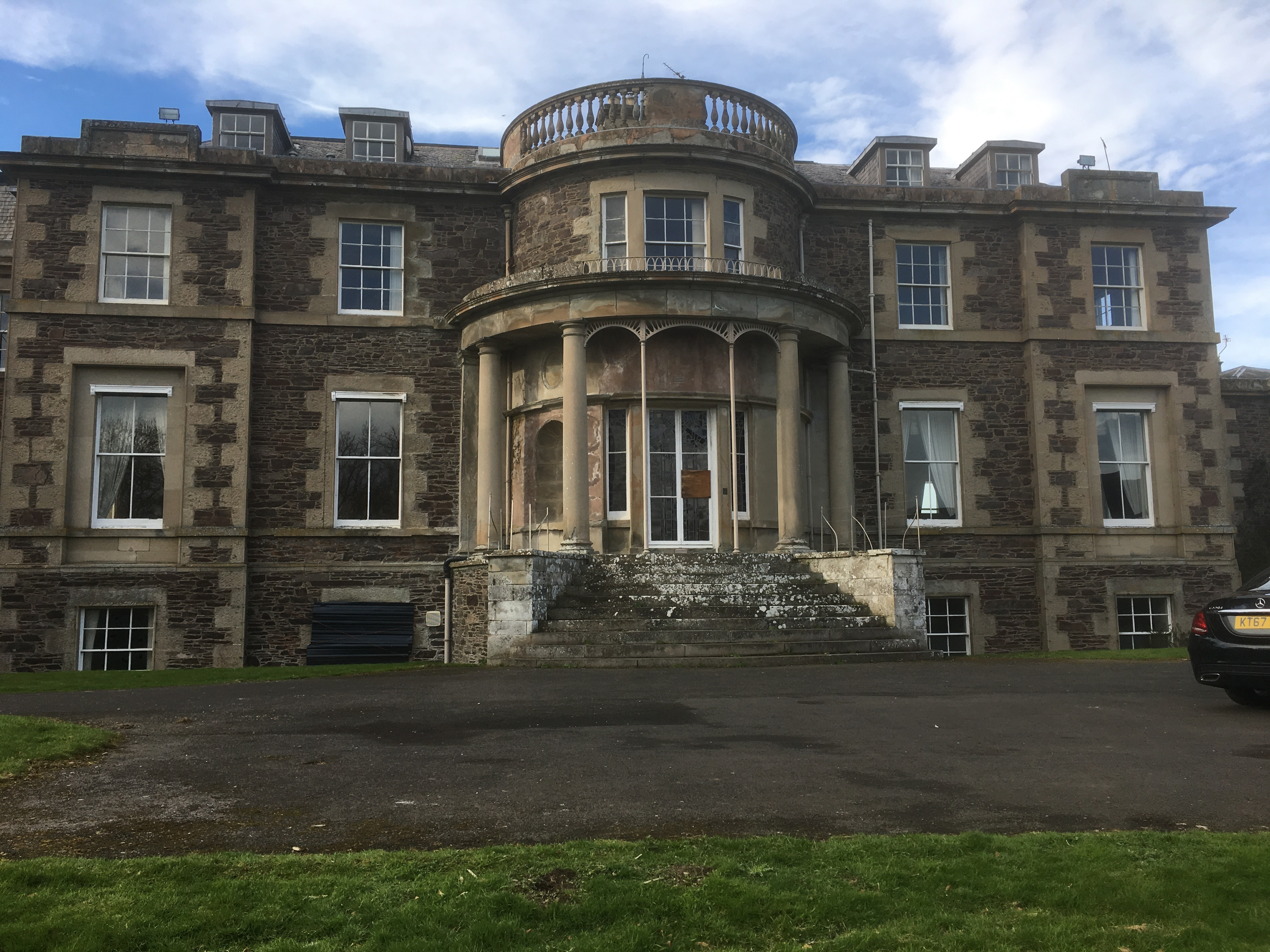
Gattonside House
