= HMS Grasshopper (1806) =

Brig-sloop of the Royal Navy

- Grasshopper

History

United Kingdom
- Name: HMS Grasshopper
- Ordered: 30 August and 31 October 1805
- Builder: Richards (Brothers) & (John) Davidson, Hythe
- Laid down: April 1806
- Launched: 29 September 1806
- Commissioned: November 1806
- Honours and awards: Naval General Service Medal with clasps: "Off Rota 4 April 1808"; "Grasshopper 24 April 1808"
- Captured: 25 December 1811

Former Kingdom of Holland
- Name: Grasshopper
- Acquired: December 1811 by capture
- Renamed: Irene
- Fate: Transferred to France December 1812

First French Empire
- Acquired: Transferred from annexed Netherlands
- Renamed: Irene on transfer
- Captured: December 1813

Kingdom of the Netherlands
- Acquired: December 1813 by capture
- Renamed: HNLMS Irene (Dutch: Zr.Ms. Irene)
- Fate: Broken up 1822

General characteristics
- Class & type: 18-gun Cruizer-class brig-sloop
- Tons burthen: 383 12/94 (bm)
- Length: 100 ft 0 in (30.5 m) (overall) 77 ft 2 5/8 in (23.5 m) (keel)
- Beam: 30 ft 6 1/2 in (9.3 m)
- Draught: 6 ft 6 in (2.0 m) (unladen) 10 ft 6 in (3.2 m) (laden)
- Depth of hold: 13 ft 12 in (4.3 m)
- Sail plan: Brig
- Armament: 16 × 32-pounder carronades; 2 × 6-pounder guns

HMS Grasshopper was a Cruizer-class brig-sloop of the Royal Navy. She was launched in 1806, captured several vessels, and took part in two notable actions before the Dutch captured her in 1811. She served in former navy of the Kingdom of Holland, French Imperial Navy and Royal Netherlands Navy until being broken up in 1822.

== British naval service ==
Commander Thomas Searle commissioned Grasshopper in November 1806. He then sailed her for the Mediterranean on 1 February 1807.

Early in the morning of 7 November, boats from HMS Renommee and Grasshopper cut out a Spanish brig and a French tartan, each armed with six guns, from under the Torre de Estacio. The prize crews were not able to prevent winds and tides from causing the two vessels to ground. The boats and the two vessels were under a constant fire from the tower that wounded several prisoners. After about three hours the British abandoned their prizes as they could not free them and were unwilling to set fire to them as the captured vessels had prisoners and women and children aboard, many of whom were wounded. The British had two men badly wounded in the action; although the enemy suffered many wounded, they apparently had no deaths.

That same day Grasshopper captured the American schooner Henrietta, Joseph Dawson, master.

Then in December Grasshopper and HMS Renommee were detached to sail off Cartagena to monitor the Spanish squadron there. Grasshopper was on lookout on 11 December and sailed ahead, leaving Renommee behind. While off Cape Palos, Searle observed several enemy vessels at anchor. His Catholic Majesty's brig San Jose y Ánimas, of twelve 24-pounders guns, with a crew of 99 men under the command of Teniente de navio Don Antonio de Torrea, got under weigh, and sailed towards Grasshopper. Two more naval vessels, Medusa Mestrio (ten 24-pounders and 77 men), and Aigle Mestrio (eight 24-pounders and 50 men) followed San Jose y Ánimas. (Note: James gives the names of the two additional vessels as Medusa and Aigle, and describes them as settees. James may be assuming that the "St." in Searle's report was an abbreviation for settee.) Grasshopper brought San Jose y Ánimas to action. Within 15 minutes San Jose y Ánimas had struck and run onshore, at which point many men of her crew abandoned her and swam for shore. The two other vessels then sailed away. The British were able to recover San Jose y Ánimas, which Searle described as being of 145 tons burthen (bm), six years old, copper-fastened, well-found, pierced for 16 guns, a "remarkably fast sailer", and suitable for service in the Royal Navy. (Note: Searle presumably hoped that the navy would purchase San Jose y Ánimas, which might have yielded more prize money than a public sale. As a side note, the description of a vessel being a "remarkably fast sailer" occurs often in the case of captures, causing the astute reader to wonder how the prey came to be caught.) In the engagement Grasshopper had two men wounded. Searle had no estimate of enemy casualties, but believed that many men had drowned when they jumped overboard to avoid capture. The head and prize money was remitted from Gibraltar and Renommee's share was paid out to her officers and crew in December 1813.

On Christmas Day, Grasshopper captured Industry.

Grasshopper captured Neutrality on 4 February 1808. She shared the proceeds of the capture with Hydra. The next day she captured Eliza.

The action that took place on 4 April off the coast off Rota near Cadiz, Spain, began when the Royal Naval frigates Mercury and Alceste, and Grasshopper, intercepted a large Spanish convoy protected by twenty gunboats and a train of shore batteries. The British destroyed two of the escorts and drove many of the merchants ashore. They also silenced the shore batteries. Marines and sailors of the British ships subsequently captured and sailed seven vessels back out to sea. Grasshopper was badly damaged and had one man mortally wounded and three others slightly wounded. The prizes were loaded with timber for the arsenal at Cadiz. In 1847 the Admiralty awarded the Naval General Service Medal with clasp "Off Rota 4 April 1808" to all surviving claimants from the action.

On 23 April Grasshopper and the gun-brig Rapid encountered two Spanish vessels from South America, sailing under the protection of four gunboats. After a short chase, the convoy anchored under the guns of a shore battery near Faro, Portugal. Searle anchored Grasshopper within grapeshot (i.e., short) range of the Spanish vessels and commenced firing. After two and a half hours, the gun crews of the shore battery had abandoned their guns, and the British had driven two gunboats ashore and destroyed them. The British also captured two gunboats and the two merchant vessels. Grasshopper had one man killed and three severely wounded. Searle himself was lightly wounded. Rapid had three men severely wounded. Spanish casualties were heavy, numbering some 40 dead and wounded on the two captured gunboats alone. Searle put 14 of the wounded on shore at Faro as he did not have the resources to deal with them as well as his own casualties. Searle estimated the value of the cargo on each of the two merchant vessels at £30,000. (Note: If Searle's estimate was correct, the capture would have made him a wealthy man. A conservative estimate would put his share at in excess of £7,500. Head money, which was paid in May 1827, was much more modest. A first-class share was worth £75 16s 1 1/4d; a fifth-class share, that of a seaman, was worth 7s 3 3/4d.) This action also resulted in the Admiralty awarding clasps to the Naval General Service Medal marked "Grasshopper 24 April 1808" and "Rapid 24 April 1808".

Lieutenant Henry Fanshawe received promotion to Commander and the appointment to command of Grasshopper on 2 May 1808; in June 1808 he took command. She remained in the Mediterranean in 1808 and 1809.

Between 4 and 11 August 1809, the merchant vessel Thetis, Clark, master, arrived at Gibraltar. As she was sailing from Cagliari, a French privateer had captured Thetis, but Grasshopper had recaptured her.

Grasshopper escorted a convoy to Quebec, sailing on 21 June 1810. She then escorted another convoy, of 25 vessels, back from Quebec, arriving in British waters around mid-October.

Grasshopper served in the North Sea in 1811.

== Capture ==
Grasshopper, together with the 74-gun Hero, the ship-sloop Egeria, and the hired armed ship Prince William left Gothenburg on 18 December 1811 as escorts to a convoy of 15 transports and a fleet of merchantmen, some 120 sail or more. Four or five days later Egeria and Prince William separated, together with the vessels going to the Humber and Scotland, including most of the merchant vessels. The transports and a handful of the merchantmen proceeded with Hero and Grasshopper.

On 24 December, Hero was wrecked off the Texel in a storm with the loss of all but 12 men of her 600 man crew. Grasshopper observed Hero ground, but too late to avoid also grounding. Grasshopper was able to get over the sandbank into deeper water, where she anchored, though striking ground repeatedly. She was unable to go to the assistance of Hero and within 15 minutes the distress signals from Hero ceased. Next morning Grasshopper observed Hero completely wrecked. Neither she nor nearby Dutch barges could get to Hero.

Grasshopper, though herself safe about a mile away, found herself trapped. She had no loss of life among her crew, though the pilot was killed. On 25 December Fanshawe saw no option but to surrender. He sailed Grasshopper to the Helder and there struck to the Franco-Dutch fleet there under Vice-admiral Jan Willem de Winter. The frigate Gloire and gunboat Ferreter took possession of Grasshopper, and her crew were taken prisoner. Among her crew was the future penal reformer Alexander Maconochie. Ten of the transports of Hero's convoy were also lost. One of them was Archimedes, whose crew, however, was saved, and another was Rosina, which lost her master and 17 men.

== Dutch naval service ==
In June 1810, Napoleon had annexed the Kingdom of Holland into the First French Empire. Grasshopper became part of the Nieuwediep squadron of the navy of the Kingdom of Holland, which was not incorporated into the French Imperial Navy. British blockades prevented the Dutch from putting Grasshopper to extensive use, and she did little of notice until the end of the Napoleonic Wars, though as a result of one pursuit by the Royal Navy she received the reputation of being the best sailing ship in the squadron. On 11 December 1812, Minister of the Navy and Colonies Denis Decrès ordered the Dutch to transfer Grasshopper to the French navy. The Dutch had intended to transfer the 6-gun brig Irene; instead, they sold Irene and transferred Grasshopper. On 2 January 1813 Grasshopper was transferred to the French Navy and renamed Irene. Dutch rebels captured Irene in December 1813 during the War of the Sixth Coalition.

After the Netherlands regained its independence in 1814, Irene was commissioned into the Royal Netherlands Navy. She convoyed ships to the Dutch Caribbean between 1815 and 1816, and served off Spain and in the Mediterranean from 1816 to 1818. She was then sent to the Dutch East Indies in 1819, remaining there 1821. In October 1819, Irene took part in the first expedition to Palembang, which the Dutch mounted against native rebels in Sumatra. She sailed up the Palembang River alongside the 44-gun frigate Wilhelmina, 20-gun sloops Eendracht and Ajax and several smaller warships. However, the squadron had to withdraw after suffering heavy losses and then restricted its efforts to coastal blockades. A second expedition to Palembang in 1821 was more successful, though it did not involve Irene.

== Fate ==
In 1821, Irene returned to the Netherlands. The next year she was broken up in Vlissingen.

== See also ==
- Loss of HMS Hero and Grasshopper: History of Portsmouth
