= HMS Pandora (1806) =

Brig-sloop of the Royal Navy

- Pandora

History

United Kingdom
- Name: HMS Pandora
- Ordered: 12 November 1805
- Builder: John Preston, Great Yarmouth
- Launched: 14 January 1806
- Acquired: 11 October 1806
- Fate: Wrecked 13 February 1811

General characteristics
- Type: Cruizer-class brig-sloop
- Tons burthen: 383 42/94 (bm)
- Length: Gundeck: 100 ft 0 in (30.5 m); Keel:77 ft 3 3/8 in (23.6 m)
- Beam: 30 ft 6 1/2 in (9.3 m)
- Draught: Unladen:6 ft 1 in (1.9 m); Laden:10 ft 11 in (3.3 m)
- Depth of hold: 12 ft 9 in (3.9 m)
- Sail plan: Brig rigged
- Complement: 121
- Armament: 16 × 32-pounder carronades; 2 × 6-pounder bow guns

HMS Pandora was launched in 1806. She captured two privateers before she was wrecked in February 1811 off the coast of Jutland.

== Career ==
Henry Hume Spence received his promotion to commander on 28 May 1806, and commissioned Pandora in December. She then served in the North Sea and on the Downs station. On 28 August 1807, Pandora was in company when Escort captured the Danish droit Emanuel.

On 13 January 1808, Pandora captured the French privateer Entreprenant, of 16 guns and 58 men, six or seven miles SSE of Folkestone, with the assistance of the hired armed cutter Active. The chase lasted an hour and 40 minutes and the French vessel did not strike until small arms fire from Pandora had wounded Captain Bloudin and five or six other men. Entreprenant was three days out of Calais and had captured the brig Mary, of Sunderland.

Pandora was among the many vessels present at the unsuccessful Walcheren Campaign and in the Scheldt in July–August 1809. She therefore shared in the subsequent prize money for the property the British army captured at that time.

Spence received promotion to post captain on 24 August 1809, Commander Richard Gaire Janvrin, who had been in charge of the port of Flushing during the British withdrawal, replaced him in October. On 12 October Pandora, under Janvrin, was among the vessels in sight when her sister ship Raleigh captured the Danish brig Friheden.

In October 1810 Commander John Macpherson Ferguson replaced Janvrin, who had been promoted to post captain on 21 October. On 31 December Pandora captured the French privateer cutter Chasseur, of 16 guns and 36 men. The privateer threw her guns overboard during the chase. Chasseur was two days out of the island of Fora but had made no captures.

== Fate ==
Pandora wrecked on 13 February 1811 on the Scaw Reef off the coast of Jutland. She was in company with the frigate Venus and both vessels were at anchor in poor weather. When the weather eased, they sighted a brig near shore and launched their boats to capture her. Venus ordered Pandora to approach the brig to provide support for the boats. However, when the boats reached the brig they saw that she was a wreck and they turned around to return to their ships. The weather worsened, but when it cleared Pandora was able to retrieve her boats. However, the weather again worsened and as Pandora attempted to locate Venus Pandora grounded. She lost her rudder, and shortly after she had cut away her masts and fired distress guns she capsized on her side.

Pandora's boats were frozen to the deck and it was only on 15 February that the Danes were able to get boats to her and to rescue most of the crew; 27 of her crew of 121 had died of exposure and the rest became prisoners. Apparently, the Danes treated their prisoners with "all possible kindness and hospitality."

In March, after the Battle of Anholt, in which the British captured a large number of Danish prisoners, Captain Joseph Baker of Tartar proposed taking his Danish prisoners to Randers and exchanging them for the officers and crew of Pandora. When Ferguson returned to England the court martial for the loss of Pandora severely reprimanded him as well as the pilot, William Famie, for their failure to take frequent depth soundings and for carrying too little sail.
