= Manchester (1805 ship) =

United Kingdom
- Name: Manchester
- Namesake: Manchester
- Builder: Falmouth
- Launched: 1805
- Fate: Last listed 1841

General characteristics
- Tons burthen: 180, or 186, or 187, or 190, or 191 (bm)
- Complement: 1813: 30; Peace establishment: 19
- Armament: 1813:6 or 8 × 6-pounder guns; 1814:10 × 9&6-pounder guns; Peace establishment:2 × 9-pounder guns

Manchester was originally built at Falmouth in 1805, and served the Post Office Packet Service. Hence, she was generally referred to as a packet ship, and often as a Falmouth packet. In 1813 an American privateer captured her after a single-ship action, but the British Royal Navy recaptured her quickly. She returned to the packet trade until 1831 when she became a whaler, making one whaling voyage to the Seychelles. From 1835 she was a merchantman, trading between London and Mauritius. She was last listed in 1841.

== Career ==
Because packet ships sailed under contract with the Royal Mail, they did not carry marine insurance. Lloyd's Register first listed Manchester only in 1812. At that time it showed her master as Elphinstone, her owner as Carne & Co., and her trade as Falmouth–Cadiz.

Still, there were earlier references in Lloyd's List. For instance, on 20 June 1806, Lloyd's List reported that the "Manchester Packet" had arrived at Falmouth from Tortola, which she had left on 18 May.

On 9 September 1810 Captain Richard L. Davies sailed Manchester from Falmouth for Brazil. She was at Madeira on 21–22 September, and Bahia on 12–23 October. She arrived at Rio de Janeiro on 2 December and left on 20 December. She returned to Falmouth on 13 January 1813.

Cadiz experienced a terrible gale between 27 and 29 March 1811. Many vessels were damaged, including the "Manchester Packet", which lost her foremast, bowsprit, etc.

=== Capture and recapture ===
On 24 June 1813 Manchester, Elphinston, master, encountered the American privateer Yorktown, of 500 tons (bm), 16 guns, and 116 men. After a 20-hour running fight and 67 minute close engagement, Manchester struck at 47°20′N 25°0′W, after first having thrown her mails overboard. She had had a passenger and two crew members slightly wounded. Captain Elphinstone had not struck until he had run out of ammunition. (Note: One of Manchester's passengers was captain (later General Sir) Edward Sabine. He and the two civilian passengers participated with great courage in the action.)

Three days earlier Yorktown had captured Lavinia, Connell, master, from Saint Johns, Newfoundland, to Oporto. Yorktown put prize crews on Manchester, Lavinia, and some other prizes, and sent them to America. On the 27th, Yorktown captured Apollo, Aikin, master, at 46°54′N 31°0′W. Apollo had been sailing from New Providence to London. Yorktown put all the prisoners from the prizes she had taken on Apollo and sent her to England. Apollo arrived at Falmouth on 9 July. (Note: Yorktown, of New York, was on her second cruise. On her first cruise she had captured twelve prizes, seven of which had reached the United States. Captain Andrew Riker had commissioned Yorktown on 10 July, a little more than a month before the Royal Navy captured her. She became the New Brunswick letter of marque Herald. Herald, of 279 tons (bm), received a letter of marque from the Vice court of Admiralty at Halifax on 11 September 1813. Her master was Charles Simonds, and her owners were Hugh Johnson & Son, and Thomas Milledge, of St. John, New Brunswick. She was described as carrying 10 guns and having a crew of 25 men.)

HMS Poictiers, Maidstone, and Nimrod recaptured Manchester on 18 August. Other records confirm that Manchester was a packet brig, R. Elphinston, master, and represented a recapture. Manchester had been a prize to the American privateer Yorktown. (Note: Records of the Falmouth packets show Manchester leaving Falmouth on 15 June, and being captured on 25 June. She was recaptured on 18 July, i.e., the day after the recapture of Yorktown, not 18 August, and arrived at Halifax on 19 July. She left there on 12 August, and arrived back at Falmouth on 4 September.) Recruit recaptured Lavinia.

When Manchester returned to Falmouth Captain Elphinston returned to command. He sailed to Halifax and when he arrived there Elphinston recognized Yorktown, which had been captured a few days before.

On 5 September 1814 Captain Robert P.R. Elphinston sailed from Falmouth for Brazil. She was at Madeira on 8–9 November. She sailed on to Rio de Janeiro, which she left on 29 November. On 20 December she fought off an American privateer at 17°09′S 35°50′W, about 200 miles SSE of Salvador. She then put into Bahia for repairs. She left Bahia on 3 January 1815 and arrived back at Falmouth on 16 March.

Year	Master	Owner	Trade	Source
1815	Elphinstone	Carne & Co.	Falmouth packet	Lloyd's Register (LR)
1820	Elphinstone	R.Symons	Falmouth packet	LR

Captain Elphinston sailed Manchester from Falmouth on 18 January 1816, bound for Brazil. She was at Madeira on 14–15 February, and Bahia on 10–13 March. She arrived at Rio de Janeiro on 22 March and left on 7 April. She returned to Falmouth on 15 June.

Captain Elphinston sailed Manchester from Falmouth on 19 August 1817, bound for Brazil. She was at Madeira on 4–5 September, and Bahia on 14–16 October. She left Rio de Janeiro on 13 November. She was at Fowey on 15 January 1818 and returned to Falmouth on 18 January.

Captain Elphinston sailed Manchester from Falmouth on 21 December 1820, bound for Brazil. She was at Madeira on 15–16 January 1821, and reached Pernambuco on 6 February. She was at Rio de Janeiro between 17 February and 4 March. She arrived back at Falmouth on 2 June.

In February 1822 "Manchester Packet" was refloated without damage, after going ashore at Falmouth in a gale.

Captain Elphinston sailed Manchester from Falmouth on 11 August 1822, bound for Brazil. She was at Madeira on 21–22 August, and reached Pernambuco on 18 September. She left Rio de Janeiro on 21 October. She arrived back at Falmouth on 9 December.

Captain Elphinston sailed Manchester from Falmouth on 8 June 1823, bound for Brazil. She was at Madeira on 16–17 June and Teneriffe on 19 June. She was at Rio de Janeiro between 1 and 10 August. She left Bahia on 23 August and Pernambuco on 1 September. She arrived back at Falmouth on 11 October.

Year	Master	Owner	Trade	Source
1825	Elphinstone	Carne & Co.	Falmouth packet	Register of Shipping (RS)
1830	Elphinstone	Carne & Co.	Falmouth packet	RS

=== Whaler ===
By 1831 Blyth & Co. had acquired Manchester. She had undergone a repair in 1830 and her new owners decided to employ her as a whaler in the Southern Whale Fishery, under the command of Captain Brown.

Brown sailed Manchester from London in 1832, bound for the Seychelles. Manchester returned on 2 May 1834 with at least 700 barrels of whale oil. Lloyd's Register for 1833 showed her trade as London–New South Wales, but that may represent only a part of her voyage.

Lloyd's Register for 1834 showed Manchester's master changing from Brown to Livesay, and her trade as London–Mauritius. In 1834 the British East India Company (EIC) had lost the last vestiges of its control over the trade between England and the Far East and had exited the shipping business. Manchester, therefore, did not need a license from the EIC to trade with Mauritius.

=== Merchantman ===
1835	Livesay	Blyth & Co.	London–Mauritius	LR
1840	Livesay	Blyth & Co.	London–Mauritius	LR

== Fate ==
Manchester was last listed in 1841 with data unchanged from 1840.
