= HMS Cressy (1810) =

Vengeur-class ship of the line

- Cressey

History

United Kingdom
- Name: Cressy
- Ordered: 1 October 1806
- Builder: Josiah & Thomas Brindley, Frindsbury
- Laid down: March 18007
- Launched: 7 March 1810
- Commissioned: November 1811
- Fate: Broken up, 1832

General characteristics (as built)
- Class & type: Vengeur-class ship of the line
- Tons burthen: 1,763 71/94 (bm)
- Length: 176 ft 1 in (53.7 m) (gundeck)
- Beam: 47 ft 10 in (14.6 m)
- Draught: 17 ft 8 in (5.4 m) (light)
- Depth of hold: 21 ft 1 in (6.4 m)
- Sail plan: Full-rigged ship
- Complement: 590
- Armament: 74 muzzle-loading, smoothbore guns; Gundeck: 28 × 32 pdr guns; Upper deck: 28 × 18 pdr guns; Quarterdeck: 4 × 12 pdr guns + 10 × 32 pdr carronades; Forecastle: 2 × 12 pdr guns + 2 × 32 pdr carronades

HMS Cressy was a 74-gun third rate ship of the line of the Royal Navy, launched on 7 March 1810 at Frindsbury.

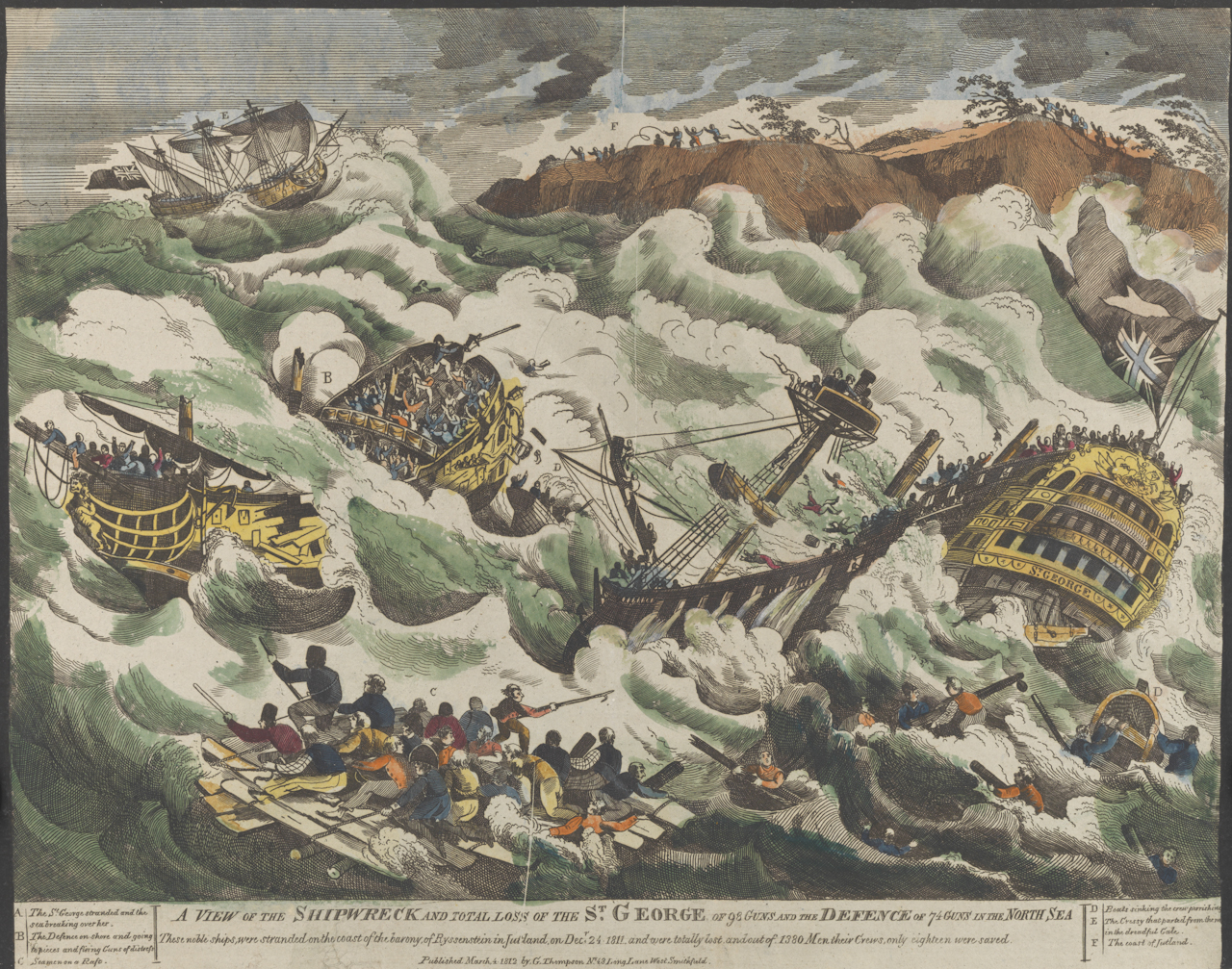
A View of the shipwreck and total loss of the St George and the Defence; Cressy can be seen top left of the picture

== Service ==
On 24 December 1811 Cressy was off the west coast of Jutland, Denmark, under command by commander Charles Dudley Pater and in the company of St George, under Rear-admiral Robert Carthew Reynolds, and Defence, when an extratropical cyclone and heavy seas came up. St George was jury-rigged and so Captain Atkins of Defence refused to leave her without the Admiral's permission. As a result, both were wrecked near Ringkøbing. Cressy did not ask for permission and so avoided wrecking.

Both St George and Defence lost almost all their crews, including the Admiral. Most of the bodies that came ashore were buried in the sand dunes of Thorsminde, which have been known ever since as "Dead Mens Dunes".

Shortly after the outbreak of the War of 1812, on 12 August, Cressy shared in the seizure of several American vessels: Cuba, Caliban, Edward, Galen, Halcyon, and Cygnet. (Note: Prize money was paid in November 1815. A first-class share was worth £360 2s 3d; a sixth-class share, that of an ordinary seaman, was worth £3 11s 7d.)

On 11 February 1813 Severn ran down and sank Wargrave. Cressy rescued Wargrave's crew. Wargrave, Ostler, master, was on a voyage from Dublin to Surinam. (Note: Wargrave, of 175 tons (bm), had been launched in Denmark in 1801.)

== Fate ==
She was broken up in 1832.
