= Archimedes (1797) =

British built cargo vessel

History

Great Britain
- Name: Archimedes
- Namesake: Archimedes
- Builder: Durham, Sunderland,
- Launched: 1797 or 1796
- Fate: Wrecked 24 December 1811

General characteristics
- Tons burthen: 245 (bm)
- Armament: 8 × 18-pounder carronades

Archimedes was launched at Sunderland in 1796 or 1797. She traded between England and the Baltic until the British government chartered her as a transport c. 1809. She was lost in December 1811, while coming back from the Baltic.

== Career ==
Archimedes first appeared in Lloyd's Register (LR) in 1797, with J.Hill, master and owner, and trade Liverpool–London. She then traded between England and the Baltic.

Lloyd's List (LL) reported on 1 June 1798, that Archimedes, Howard, master, had been taken while sailing from Haambro to Petersburg. However, Lloyd's List showed Archimedes, Howard, master, in Elsinor in mid-July and Memel in early August.

Archimedes was a unique name in Lloyd's Register so the vessel taken and reappearing may be the same Archimedes as the one of this article; she disappeared from Lloyd's Register between 1798 and 1800. In a process that is currently unclear Archimedes returned to British ownership. She reappeared in the Register of Shipping in 1800, the first year in which the Register published, even though she did not reappear in Lloyd's Register until 1803.

| Year | Master | Owner | Trade | Source |
|---|---|---|---|---|
| 1800 | J.Palan | Bonner & Co. | Sidmouth–Baltic | Register of Shipping (RS) |
| 1803 | Rockwood | Jolly & Co. | Liverpool–Dantzig | LR |
| 1805 | Rockwood | Jolly & Co. | Liverpool–Dantzig | LR |
| 1809 | Rockwood; Haly | Jolly & Co. Crosbie | Liverpool–Dantzig; London transport | LR |

== Loss ==
The Register of Shipping (RS) for 1812, showed Archimedes with Haley, master, Corsbie, owner, and trade London transport. The entry carries the annotation "LOST".

On 24–25 December 1811, a tremendous storm destroyed several vessels of an English convoy coming back to England from the Baltic. HMS Hero, under captain James Newman-Newman, was wrecked on the Haak Sands at the mouth of the Texel with the loss of all but 12 of her crew. Ten of the transports of Hero's convoy were also lost. One of them was Archimedes, whose crew, however, was saved. The other escort for the transports, HMS Grasshopper ended up trapped near the Helder and had to surrender to the Dutch. The number of men saved on Archimedes and Grasshopper was reported as 114, most of whom would have been from Grasshopper. Three of the other transports lost were Flora, Centurion, and Rosina. Part of Flora's crew, like that of Archimedes, was saved. The master and 17 men from Rosina were lost, as was the entire crew of Centurion.
