= Good Design (1793 ship) =

British merchant and Royal Navy ship

History

Great Britain
- Builder: Thomas Hearn, North Shields
- Launched: 1793
- Fate: Wrecked 1805

General characteristics
- Tons burthen: 320 (bm)
- Armament: 1793:4 × 4-pounder guns; 1796:4 × 6-pounder guns; Armed ship:14 × 24-pounder carronades

Good Design was launched in Shields in 1793. She became a Newcastle-based transport. Between 1797 and 1802 she served the British Royal Navy as a hired armed ship, convoying vessels in the North Sea and transporting troops. Her crew qualified for a clasp to the Naval General Service Medal for her service in the 1801 Egyptian campaign. She returned to mercantile service and apparently was lost in 1805.

== Career ==
Good Design first appeared in Lloyd's Register (LR) in 1793.

Year	Master	Owner	Trade	Source
1793	J.Shorter	Hurry & Co.	London	LR
1796	J.Shorter	Hurry & Co.	London	LR

Hired armed ship: The Admiralty hired Good Design on 2 February 1797. Commander Wilson Rathbone commissioned her in May. In her he convoyed merchant vessels sailing from Leith to the Elbe, or Elsinore. In December 1799 he transferred to the command of HMS Racoon.

Commander A.Brown replaced Rathbone. Good Design continued on the North Sea station. In February 1801 he received promotion to post-captain. On 14 February 1801 Lieutenant Robert Elliot was promoted to Commander and given command of Good Design.

On 24 April Good Intent arrived at Plymouth Sound with troops for Jersey and Guernsey. On 4 May she sailed for Jersey with troops from the 9th regiment of Foot. The British government sent the reinforcements in response to reports that French troops were being sent to the coast opposite the Channel Isles and Marcou. Good Design arrived back at Spithead from Jersey on 18 May.

On 16 June Good Design and Gorgon sailed from Cork. They were carrying the 22nd Regiment of Light Dragoons to Egypt. Because Good Design served in the navy's Egyptian campaign (8 March to 2 September 1801), her officers and crew qualified for the clasp "Egypt" to the Naval General Service Medal, which the Admiralty issued in 1847 to all surviving claimants. Elliott was one of the officers to whom the Turkish government presented gold medals for their service in Egypt. (Note: In 1843–1844 Elliot was awarded a pension of £150 per year for his service. He was described as totally blind in consequence of "the Ophthalmia contracted in Egypt." The pension listing gave an abstract of his service, and noted the Turkish gold medal.)

On 26 October it was announced at Hull that the hired armed ships Prince William, Good Design, and Pomona were to be paid off at Newcastle following the signing of a treaty at Amiens; hostilities officially had ceased on 22 October. As Good Design was in the Mediterranean, she would not be paid off until she returned.

Official records indicate that Good Design's contract ended on 23 January 1802. However, she did not arrive at Portsmouth until 2 February 1802. She had brought troops of the 12th Regiment of Dragoons. She sailed on 6 February for Woolwich to be paid off.

Mercantile service: Good Design returned to mercantile service, but Lloyd's Register did not carry her. The Register of Shipping, first published in 1800, did. It had carried her since 1800, but with stale data. (The registers were only as accurate as their owners bothered to keep them.)

Year	Master	Owner	Trade	Source
1800	R.Watson	Trewhitt	Newcastle transport	RS
1802	R.Watson; Fotheringham	Trewhit	Newcastle transport Newcastle–London	RS

Good Design started trading with the Baltic. Good Design, Fotheringham, master, was reported to have arrived at Gravesend from Memel on 22 July 1803.

== Fate ==
On 23 March 1805 Good Design, Aitkens, master, was driven ashore on the coast of the Isle of Man and was wrecked. Her crew were rescued. She was on a voyage from Liverpool to Riga. She was no longer listed in the 1806 volume of the Register of Shipping.
