= Traveller (1786 ship) =

History

Great Britain
- Name: Traveller
- Launched: 1786, Hull
- Captured: 1808

General characteristics
- Tons burthen: 221, or 300 (bm)
- Armament: 2 × 4-pounder guns

Traveller was launched at Hull in 1786. She traded between Hull and the Baltic until 1796 or so, when she began making annual voyages as a Greenlandman, that is, as a whaler in the northern whale fishery. She was captured in 1808 during the Gunboat War while trading with the Baltic between annual whaling voyages.

== Career ==
Traveller first entered and Lloyd's Register (LR) in 1786.

Year	Master	Owner	Trade	Source
1786	Wright	Green & Co.	Hull–Petersburg	LR
1789	Harwood	Green & Co.	Hull–Königsberg	LR
1796	Compleman; G.Armstrong	Green & Co.	Hull–Königsberg; Hull–Greenland	LR
1797	Armstrong	Green & Co.	Hull–Königsberg; Hull–Greenland	LR
1798	Armstrong	Green & Co.	Hull–Greenland	LR

From at least 1796 on Traveller engaged in whale hunting in the northern whale fishery.

Year	Tuns of whale oil
1796	100
1797	90
1798	120
1799	74
1800	80
1801	94

Year	Master	Owner	Trade	Source
1802	Armstrong; W.Vennis	Green & Co. Levitt	Hull–Greenland	LR

Year	Tuns of whale oil
1802	22
1803	15.5

Year	Master	Owner	Trade	Source
1804	W.Vennis; Keeler	Levitt; Eggington	Hull–Greenland	LR
1805	Keeler; Foster	Eggington; Levett	Hull–Greenland	LR

Year	Tuns of whale oil
1804	104
1805	124
1806	84
1807	109

The whaling season generally ran from March–April to September–October. Between whaling voyages, Traveller sailed to the Baltic. Lloyd's List reported in January 1806 that Traveller, Foster, master, had arrived at Hull having sailed from Riga via the Elbe, where she had joined a convoy under escort by the armed ship Prince William.

== Fate ==
Lloyd's List reported in January 1808 that Traveller, Foster, master, had put into Carlsham to join a convoy. Lloyd's List reported in February that Ann, Harrison, master, and Traveller, Foster, master, from Stockholm, were captured and taken into Bornholm.
