= John Macpherson Ferguson =

Rear-Admiral John MacPherson Ferguson
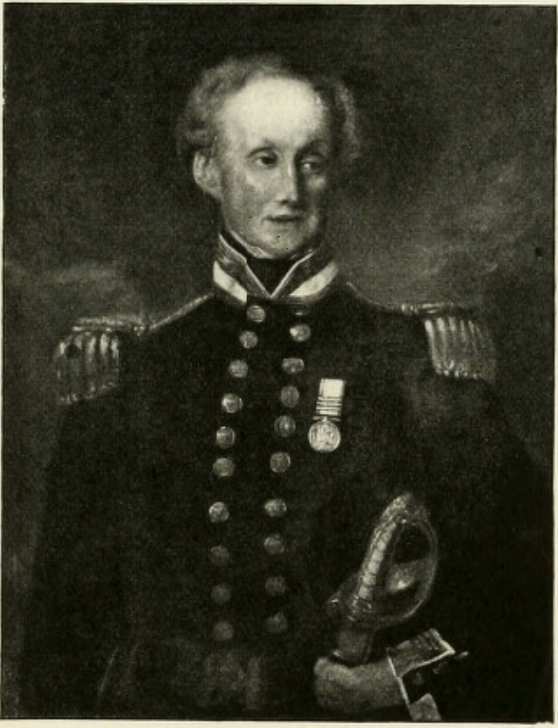
- Admiral John Ferguson in his Royal Navy Uniform.
- Born: 15 August 1784; Edinburgh
- Died: 8 June 1855 (aged 70); Edinburgh
- Military career
- Allegiance: United Kingdom
- Branch: Royal Navy
- Rank: Rear-Admiral

John Macpherson Ferguson (1783–1855) was a Scot serving in the Royal Navy during the Napoleonic Wars. From 1823 mainly in command of HMS Mersey, he rose to the rank of Rear Admiral.

== Life ==
He was born at Argyle Square in Edinburgh on 15 August 1784 the son of Adam Ferguson and his wife, Catherine Burnett. His elder brother was Sir Adam Ferguson The family moved to South Castle Street (just off Princes Street) soon after the street was built (around 1792).

In 1796, he entered the Royal Navy aged twelve as a First Class Volunteer on board the Caesar. In 1800 he was Midshipman. He fought at the Battle of Copenhagen in 1801. He saw service on La Loire, Aurora and in 1803 HMS Victory, under the flag of Lord Nelson in the Mediterranean. In 1804 he was commissioned as a lieutenant in the Royal Navy in the midst of the Napoleonic Wars. In July 1808 he was promoted to captain. In October 1810 he was given his first command: the relatively new, 18-gun HMS Pandora, replacing Commander Richard Janverin. On Pandora, on New Year's Eve 1810/11, he captured the French privateer Chasseur. The 16-gun Chasseur threw her cannon overboard before capture but the ship and crew of 36 came under Ferguson's control. On 13 February 1811, Pandora was wrecked in a storm on the Kattegat off the coast of Jutland (modern day Denmark). Although 27 (or 29) of the crew of 121 were drowned, Ferguson was amongst the survivors. The survivors huddled in the wrecked hull until 15 February when a Danish ship came to their rescue, but, Denmark being sided against Britain at the time, Ferguson and his crew were taken prisoner. In March, after the Battle of Anholt, in which the British captured a large number of Danish prisoners, Captain Joseph Baker of Tartar proposed taking his Danish prisoners to Randers and exchanging them for the officers and crew of Pandora. When Ferguson returned to England the court martial for the loss of Pandora severely reprimanded him as well as the pilot, William Famie, for their failure to take frequent depth soundings and for carrying too little sail.

He spent a period with no command, probably due to some blame attaching him for losing the Pandora and his capture. In August 1815 he replaced Commander George Hilton as commander of HMS Nimrod. The Nimrod was war-hardened both against the French and in North America, but the world was entering a period of peace. His service on Nimrod was mainly on the British coast, based in Portsmouth and Leith.

On 1 January 1817 he was promoted to captain but with no command.

In April 1823 he took command of HMS Mersey which had undergone a two-year refit, having last been under command of George Collier. He saw service off the coast of South America.

He was raised to the rank of rear admiral.

Ferguson died on 5 June 1855 and is buried next to his brother in an enclosed vault within the sealed "Covenanters Prison" section of Greyfriars Kirkyard next to his great uncle Joseph Black.

== Family ==
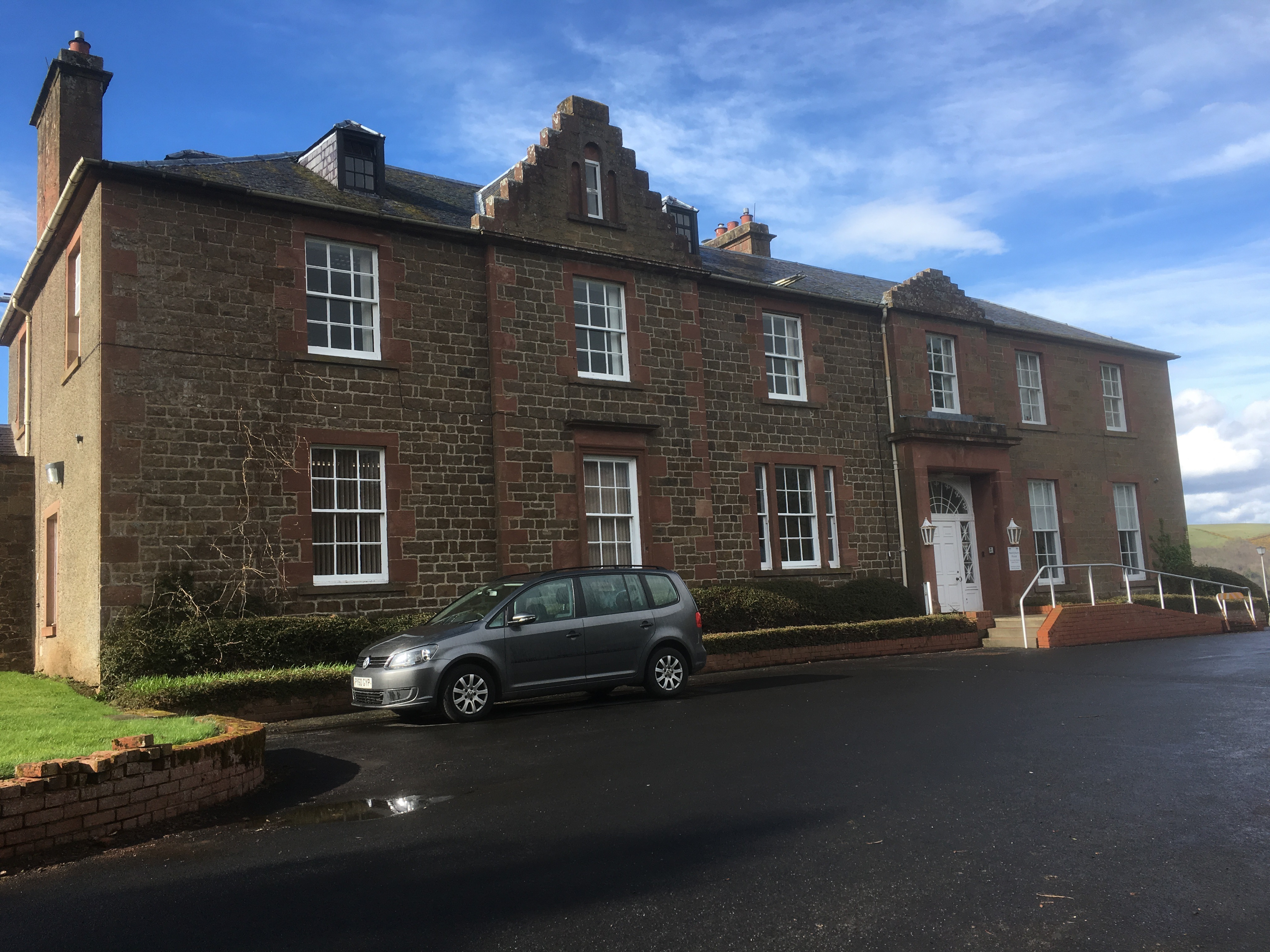
Huntlyburn House

in 1818 until 1823 he joins his brothers and sisters living at Huntlyburn House, Melrose, purchased by Sir Walter Scott.

In 1836 Ferguson married Elizabeth Lauder Guild (1812-1894), almost thirty years his junior. After his death "Mrs Admiral Ferguson" is listed as living at 2 Eton Terrace in Edinburgh's West End. Their only son, Captain Adam Ferguson (1836–1865), served with the 42nd Highlanders (Black Watch).

His brother was Sir Adam Ferguson. His great uncle was Joseph Black.
