= HMS Swan (1811) =

Cutter of the Royal Navy

History

United Kingdom
- Name: HMS Swan
- Ordered: 21 January 1811
- Builder: Thomas Gely, Cowes
- Laid down: June 1811
- Launched: 1 November 1811

General characteristics
- Class & type: Nimble-class cutter
- Tons burthen: 144 (bm)
- Length: Overall:63 ft 5 in (19.3 m); Keel:49 ft 4 1/2 in (15.0 m)
- Beam: 23 ft 5 in (7.1 m)
- Depth of hold: 10 ft 2 in (3.1 m)
- Complement: 50
- Armament: 10 × 12-pounder carronades

HMS Swan was one of a two-vessel class of cutters built at Cowes for the Royal Navy in 1811. She had an unexceptional wartime career. After the war she served in fishery protection, and half of her entire career as a floating chapel for seamen. She was broken up in 1874.

== Napoleonic Wars ==
Lieutenant Henry Rowed commissioned her in November 1811 for the Channel. In June 1814 Lieutenant James Whitthorn replaced Rowed, at the Nore. In August 1815 Lieutenant William Smith assumed command of Swan.

== Post-war ==
Lieutenant James Griffiths took command of Swan in June 1817. Lieutenant Thomas Dilnot Stewart replaced Griffiths in April 1819, and stayed in command into 1822.

Lieutenant Charles Griffin assumed command in March 1823 at Sheerness. He recommissioned Swan at the Nore in March 1825. Lieutenant Joseph Webb replaced Griffin at the Nore in March 1826.

In 1827 Swan came under the command of Lieutenant Joseph Webb. Lieutenant John Goldie replaced Webb in May 1828.

In July–August 1831 Swan underwent fitting at Sheerness for service as a fishery protection vessel. Lieutenant John Lane took command in June and remained in command until 1836.

== Chapel ship ==
In June–July 1837 Swan became a chapel ship on the Thames for the Seamen's Home Society. In the mid-1840s, HMS Brazen, at that time the Episcopal Floating Church Society's only "floating chapel" in the London area, required a replacement. The Elder Brethren of Trinity House found in the Bristol Channel a successful ministry, led by John Ashley, and determined on a new floating "Thames Church". In 1844 the Thames Church Mission was formed, under Captain William Waldegrave; and through Captain R. J. Elliot RN, of the Sailors' Home, Well Street, requested from the Admiralty the loan of HMS Swan. It opened as a chapel in 1845, with the patronage of the Archbishop of Canterbury. In 1846 the Rev. William Holderness was appointed to the Swan, and he used it for an energetic ministry along the River Thames.

Holderness was born 1819 in Kingston-upon-Hull, and was an 1843 graduate of St Bees Theological College, where he was taught by David Anderson, ordained priest in 1845. He held the post on the Swan for seven years, moving in 1853 to become chaplain at Portland Prison. He attempted to return to the London area in the 1875 election for vicar of St James's Church, Clerkenwell; but lost out to the Rev. John Henry Rose.

In 1861, the Rev. Daniel Greatorex, chaplain to the Thames Mission Society, described the Thames beat of the Swan as extending from Blackwall to Gravesend. It ministered to coal barges, by the hundred. In 1862 he took over the former Mariners' Church in Wellclose Square for a social ministry.

== Fate ==
Swan was broken up at Sheerness, with the breaking up being completed on 7 December 1874.
