= HMS Hero (1803) =

Fame-class ship of the line

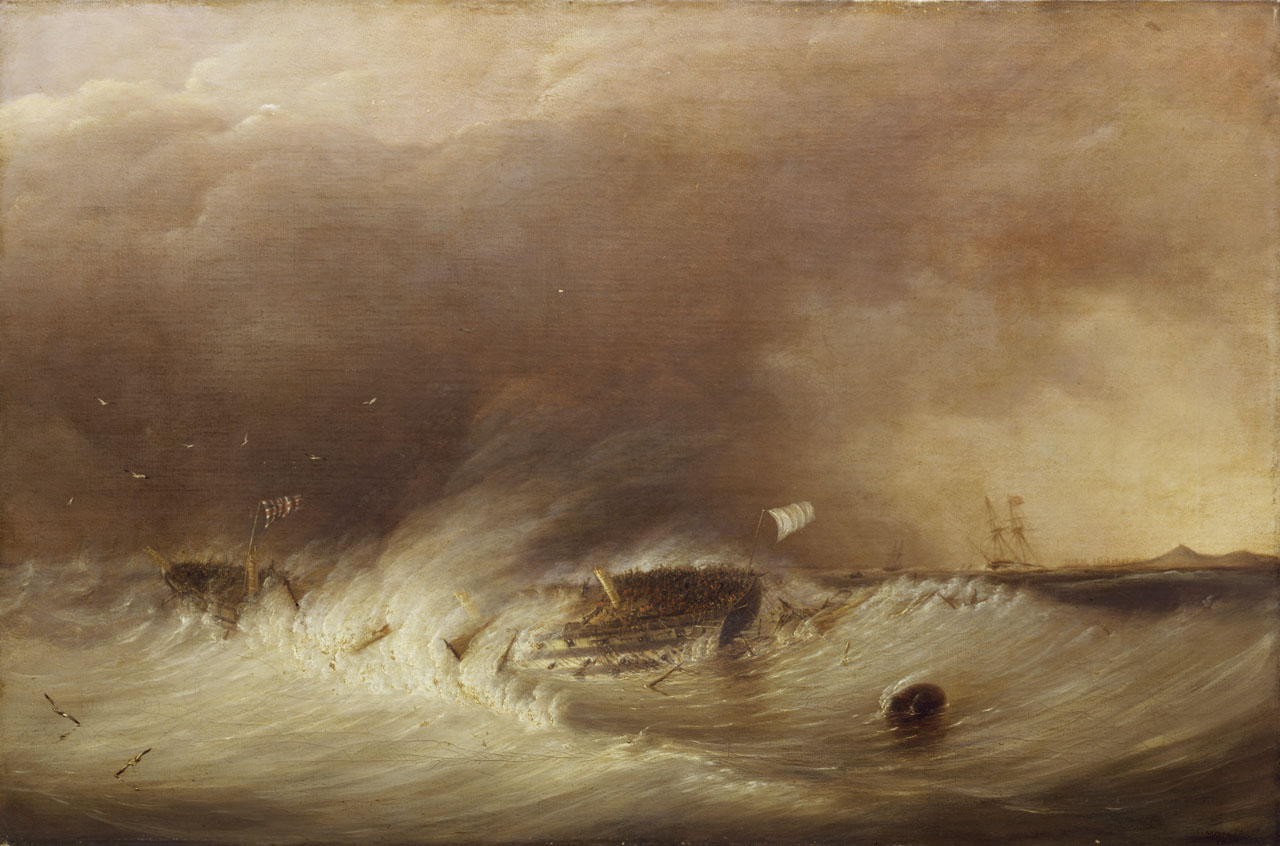
- The wreck of HMS Hero in the Texel, 25 December 1811

History

United Kingdom
- Name: HMS Hero
- Ordered: 24 June 1800
- Builder: Perry, Blackwall Yard
- Laid down: August 1800
- Launched: 18 August 1803
- Honours and awards: Participated in: Battle of Cape Finisterre
- Fate: Wrecked, 1811

General characteristics
- Class & type: Fame-class ship of the line
- Tons burthen: 1743 (bm)
- Length: 175 ft (53 m) (gundeck)
- Beam: 47 ft 6 in (14.48 m)
- Depth of hold: 20 ft 6 in (6.25 m)
- Propulsion: Sails
- Sail plan: Full-rigged ship
- Complement: 530
- Armament: 74 guns: Gundeck: 28 × 32-pounder guns; Upper gundeck: 28 × 18-pounder guns; QD: 14 × 9-pounder guns; Fc: 4 × 9-pounder guns

HMS Hero was a 74-gun third rate of the Royal Navy, launched on 18 August 1803 at Blackwall Yard.

She took part in Admiral Robert Calder's action at the Battle of Cape Finisterre in 1805. Later in the same year Hero was a part of the squadron commanded by Captain Sir Richard Strachan that won the Battle of Cape Ortegal.

On 25 December 1811 Hero, under captain James Newman-Newman, was wrecked on the Haak Sands at the mouth of the Texel during a gale, with the loss of all but 12 of her crew.
