= List of ship launches in 1805 =

The list of ship launches in 1805 includes a chronological list of some ships launched in 1805.

Date	Ship	Class	Builder	Location	Country	Notes
1 January	Martin	Merlin-class sloop	Benjamin Tanner	Dartmouth	United Kingdom	For Royal Navy.
2 January	Desperate	Archer-class gun-brig	Thomas White	Broadstairs	United Kingdom	For Royal Navy.
4 January	Forward	Archer-class gun-brig	Joseph Todd	Berwick upon Tweed	United Kingdom	For Royal Navy.
5 January	Marchioness Wellesley	Merchantman	Thomas Hawkins	Calcutta	India	For private owner.
14 January	Jane, Duchess of Gordon	East Indiaman	Dudman	Deptford	United Kingdom	For British East India Company.
15 January	Forbes	Merchantman	Michael Smith	Calcutta	India	For private owner.
16 January	Earnest	Archer-class gun-brig	Menzies & Goalen	Leith	United Kingdom	For Royal Navy.
16 January	Oreste	Oreste-class brig		Havre de Grâce	France	For French Navy.
16 January	Woodlark	Archer-class gun-brig	Menzies & Goalen	Leith	United Kingdom	For Royal Navy.
17 January	Governor Hunter	Schooner	Isaac Nichols	Sydney	(United Kingdom of Great Britain and Ireland) New South Wales	For private owner.
17 January	Neptune	West Indiaman	Brockman	Lancaster	United Kingdom	For private owner.
17 January	Pitt	Perseverance-class frigate	Jamsetjee Bomanjee Wadia	Calcutta	India	For Royal Navy.
17 January	Pomone	Leda-class frigate	Josiah & Thomas Brindley	Frindsbury	United Kingdom	For Royal Navy.
17 January	Pluton	Téméraire-class ship of the line		Toulon	France	For French Navy.
31 January	Avon	Cruizer-class brig-sloop	Symons	Falmouth	United Kingdom	For Royal Navy.
January	Martin	Merlin-class sloop	Benjamin Tanner	Dartmouth	United Kingdom	For Royal Navy.
January	Surinam	Cruizer-class brig-sloop	Obadiah Ayles	Topsham	United Kingdom	For Royal Navy.
January	Weazel	Cruizer-class brig-sloop	Thomas Owen	Topsham	United Kingdom	For Royal Navy.
1 February	Protector	Archer-class gun-brig	Matthew Warren	Brightlingsea	United Kingdom	For Royal Navy.
2 February	Calypso	Cruizer-class brig-sloop	John Dudman	Deptford	United Kingdom	For Royal Navy.
2 February	Dexterous	Archer-class gun-brig	Balthazar & Edward Adams	Buckler's Hard	United Kingdom	For Royal Navy.
2 February	Northumberland	East Indiaman	Francis Hurry	Newcastle upon Tyne	United Kingdom	For British East India Company.
2 February	Sharpshooter	Archer-class gun-brig	Matthew Warren	Brightlingsea	United Kingdom	For Royal Navy.
10 February	Pomone	Hortense-class frigate		Genoa	Ligurian Republic	For French Navy.
15 February	Nisus	Palinure-class brig	Lerond Campion et Cie.	Granville	France	For French Navy.
1 March	Gunboat No. 5	Gunboat	William Price	Baltimore, Maryland	United States	For United States Navy.
1 March	Topaze	Gloire-class frigate		Nantes	France	For French Navy.
1 March	Wolverine	Cruizer-class brig-sloop	Thomas Owen	Topsham	United Kingdom	For Royal Navy.
2 March	Otter	Merlin-class sloop	Peter Atkinson	Hull	United Kingdom	For Royal Navy.
21 March	Haddock	Ballahoo-class schooner	Goodrich & Co.	Bermuda	(United Kingdom of Great Britain and Ireland) Bermuda	For Royal Navy.
30 March	William Pitt	East Indiaman	Frances Barnard, Son & Roberts	Deptford	United Kingdom	For British East India Company.
12 April	Hearty	Confounder-class brig	Jabez Bailey	Ipswich	United Kingdom	For Royal Navy.
12 April	Régulus	Téméraire-class ship of the line		Lorient	France	For French Navy.
13 April	Revenge	Third rate		Chatham Dockyard	United Kingdom	For Royal Navy.
13 April	Streatham	East Indiaman	Dudman	Deptford	United Kingdom	For British East India Company.
17 April	Martial	Confounder-class brig	Charles Ross	Rochester	United Kingdom	For Royal Navy.
17 April	Pylade	Brig		Havre de Grâce	France	For French Navy.
17 April	Resolute	Confounder-class brig	John King	Dover	United Kingdom	For Royal Navy.
27 April	Redbreast	Archer-class gun-brig	John Preston	Great Yarmouth	United Kingdom	For Royal Navy.
April	Brisk	Merlin-class sloop	Benjamin Tanner	Dartmouth	United Kingdom	For Royal Navy.
April	Confounder	Confounder-class brig	Robert Adams	Southampton	United Kingdom	For Royal Navy.
April	King George	Full-rigged ship	Underwood & Cable	Sydney	(United Kingdom of Great Britain and Ireland) New South Wales	For Simeon Lord.
2 May	Exertion	Confounder-class brig	John Preston	Yarmouth	United Kingdom	For Royal Navy.
10 May	Conflict	Confounder-class brig	Robert Davy	Topsham	United Kingdom	For Royal Navy.
13 May	Indignant	Confounder-class brig	Nicholas Bools & William Good	Bridport	United Kingdom	For Royal Navy.
16 May	Encounter	Confounder-class brig	Robert Guillaume	Northam	United Kingdom	For Royal Navy.
16 May	Strenuous	Confounder-class brig	William Rowe	Newcastle upon Tyne	United Kingdom	For Royal Navy.
18 May	Rose	Merlin-class ship-sloop	William Rule	Hastings	United Kingdom	For Royal Navy.
21 May	Encounter	Gun-brig	Guillaume	Southampton	United Kingdom	For Royal Navy.
28 May	Moira	Schooner	Upper Canada	Kingston, Ontario	(United Kingdom of Great Britain and Ireland)	For Royal Navy.
28 May	Wrangler	Archer-class gun-brig	John Dudman	Deptford	United Kingdom	For Royal Navy.
30 May	Inveterate	Confounder-class brig	Nicholas Bools & William Good	Bridport	United Kingdom	For Royal Navy.
30 May	Rebuff	Confounder-class brig	John Davidson	Hythe	United Kingdom	For Royal Navy.
May	Starling	Confounder-class gun-brig	William Rowe	Newcastle upon Tyne	United Kingdom	For Royal Navy.
14 June	Minorca	Cruizer-class brig-sloop	Josiah & Thomas Brindley	King's Lynn	United Kingdom	For Royal Navy.
17 June	Shpitsbergen	Fifth rate	M. Sarychev	Arkhangelsk	Russia	For Imperial Russian Navy.
27 June	Apollo	Lively-class frigate	George Parsons	Bursledon	United Kingdom	For Royal Navy.
27 June	Borée	Téméraire-class ship of the line		Toulon	France	For French Navy.
28 June	Hornet	Sloop-of-war	William Price	Baltimore, Maryland	United States	For United States Navy.
June	Minorca	Cruizer-class brig-sloop	Josiah and Thomas Brindley	King's Lynn	United Kingdom	For Royal Navy.
1 July	Seagull	Seagull-class brig-sloop	John King	Dover	United Kingdom	For Royal Navy.
1 July	Solombal	Sixth rate	A. M. Kurochkin	Arkhangelsk	Russia	For Imperial Russian Navy.
4 July	Grom	Bomb vessel	Lukmanov	Astrakhan	Russia	For Imperial Russian Navy.
9 July	Jupiter	Merchantman	Simon Temple	South Shields	United Kingdom	For Mr. Bousfield.
11 July	Imogen	Seagull-class brig-sloop	Jabez Bayley	Ipswich	United Kingdom	For Royal Navy.
16 July	Kite	Fly-class brig-sloop	Matthew Warren	Brightlingsea	United Kingdom	For Royal Navy.
17 July	Moshchnyi	Third rate	A. M. Kurochkin	Arkhangelsk	Russia	For Imperial Russian Navy.
17 July	Turbulent	Confounder-class gun-brig	Benmamin Tanner	Dartmouth	United Kingdom	For Royal Navy.
18 July	Neva	Sixth rate	M. Sarychev	Saint Petersburg	Russia	For Imperial Russian Navy.
18 July	Skoryi	Third rate	A. M. Kurochkin	Arkhangelsk	Russia	For Imperial Russian Navy.
18 July	Tvyordyi	Urill-class ship of the line	A. I. Melikhov	Arkhangelsk	Russia	For Imperial Russian Navy.
20 July	Lougen	Lougen-class brig	Ernst Wilhelm Stibolt	Copenhagen	Denmark-Norway	For Dano-Norwegian Navy.
20 July	Savage	Seagull-class brig-sloop	Robert Adams	Southampton	United Kingdom	For Royal Navy.
25 July	Havock	Confounder-class brig	William Stone & Mr. Custuno	Great Yarmouth	United Kingdom	For Royal Navy.
26 July	Starr	Merlin-class ship-sloop	Benjamin Tanner	Dartmouth	United Kingdom	For Royal Navy.
28 July	Delphinen	Lougen-class brig	Ernst Wilhelm Stibolt	Copenhagen	Denmark-Norway	For Dano-Norwegian Navy.
28 July	Hornet	Sloop-of-war		Baltimore, Maryland	United States	For United States Navy.
28 July	Kherson	Transport ship	M. K. Surovtsov	Kherson	Russia	For Imperial Russian Navy.
29 July	Nightingale	Brig-sloop	Thomas King	Dover	United Kingdom	For Royal Navy.
29 July	Sparrow	Fly-class brig-sloop	John Preston	Great Yarmouth	United Kingdom	For Royal Navy.
10 August	Resistance	Lively-class frigate	Charles Ross	Chatham Dockyard	United Kingdom	For Royal Navy.
12 August	Bustler	Confounder-class brig	Obadiah Ayles	Topsham	United Kingdom	For Royal Navy.
12 August	Raven	Fly-class brig-sloop	Matthew Warren	Brightlingsea	United Kingdom	For Royal Navy.
13 August	Oberon	Seagull-class brig-sloop	James Shepherd	Sutton-on-Hull	United Kingdom	For Royal Navy.
16 August	Génois	Téméraire-class ship of the line	Muzzio & Mignone	Genoa	Ligurian Republic	For French Navy.
24 August	Name unknown	Merchantman	William Osborne	Kingston	United Kingdom	For private owner.
26 August	Intelligent	Confounder-class brig	Nicholas Bools & William Good	Bridport	United Kingdom	For Royal Navy.
7 September	Arrow	Schooner	Henry Peake	Deptford	United Kingdom	For Royal Navy.
9 September	Minerve	Fifth rate	Jean-Charles Rigoult de Genouilly	Rochefort	France	For French Navy.
19 September	Kangaroo	Sloop-of-war	Joseph Brindley	King's Lynn	United Kingdom	For Royal Navy.
21 September	Prindsesse Caroline	Prindsesse Caroline-class ship of the line		Copenhagen	Denmark-Norway	For Dano-Norwegian Navy.
23 September	Milanaise	Milanaise-class frigate	Louis Jean Baptiste Bretocq	Dunkirk	France	For French Navy.
23 September	Virago	Confounder-class brig	Benjamin Tanner	Dartmouth	United Kingdom	For Royal Navy.
24 September	Royal Yeoman	West Indiaman	Gleed	Weymouth	United Kingdom	For Mr. Willis.
8 October	Fame	Fame-class ship of the line	Elias Bird	Deptford Dockyard	United Kingdom	For Royal Navy.
23 October	Orestes	Seagull-class brig-sloop	Jabez Bayley	Ipswich	United Kingdom	For Royal Navy.
24 October	Fly	Fly-class brig-sloop	Nicholas Bools & William Good	Bridport	United Kingdom	For Royal Navy.
24 October	Ocean	Second rate	Edward Sison	Woolwich Dockyard	United Kingdom	For Royal Navy.
24 October	Thames	Thames-class frigate	Robert Seppings	Chatham Dockyard	United Kingdom	For Royal Navy.
25 October	Minerva	Thames-class Frigate	Henry Peake	Deptford Dockyard	United Kingdom	For Royal Navy.
October	Indian	Bermuda-class sloop	Robert Shedden	Bermuda	(United Kingdom of Great Britain and Ireland) Bermuda	For Royal Navy.
9 November	Adder	Confounder-class brig	Obadiah Ayles	Topsham	United Kingdom	For Royal Navy.
9 November	Lord Collingwood	West Indiaman	Ayles	Wapping	United Kingdom	For private owner.
November	Whiting	Ballahoo-class schooner	Goodrich & Co.	Bermuda	(United Kingdom of Great Britain and Ireland) Bermuda	For Royal Navy.
November	Wizard	Fly-class brig-sloop	Thomas Sutton	Ringmore	United Kingdom	For Royal Navy.
7 December	Paulina	Seagull-class brig-sloop	Robert Guillaume	Northam	United Kingdom	For Royal Navy.
16 December	David Shaw	Merchantman		Whitehaven	United Kingdom	For Stitt & Co.
17 December	Paulina	Seagull-class brig-sloop	Robert Guillaume	Northam	United Kingdom	For Royal Navy.
24 December	Swallow	Cruizer-class brig-sloop	Benjamin Tanner	Dartmouth	United Kingdom	For Royal Navy.
30 December	Diana	Frigate		Rotterdam	(Netherlands) Kingdom of Holland	For Royal Netherlands Navy.
December	Dapper	Confounder-class brig	Robert Adams	Southampton	United Kingdom	For Royal Navy.
Unknown date	Albion	Merchantman	Michael Smith	Calcutta	India	For private owner.
Unknown date	Alexander Brodie	Merchantman	Cooper	Calcutta	India	For Thomas Garland Murray.
Unknown date	Austerlitz	Privateer			United States	For private owner.
Unknown date	Beaver	Barque	Eckford & Beebe	New York	United States	For John Jacob Astor.
Unknown date	Bermuda	Bermuda-class sloop		Bermuda	(United Kingdom of Great Britain and Ireland) Bermuda	For Royal Navy.
Unknown date	Betsey or Betsy	Brig	John & Philip Laing	Sunderland	United Kingdom	For private owner.
Unknown date	Betsey, Betsy or Betsys	Brig	John & Philip Laing	Sunderland	United Kingdom	For private owner.
Unknown date	Bootle	Slave ship		Liverpool	United Kingdom	For Mr. Kitchen.
Unknown date	Caroline	Merchantman	John Harvey & John Fostger	Calcutta	India	For Clastelin & Co.
Unknown date	Dame Ernouf	Privateer			France	For private owner.
Unknown date	Despatch	Smack	Nicholas Bools & William Good	Bridport	United Kingdom	For Nicholas Bools & William Good.
Unknown date	Elizabeth	Barque		Dartmouth	United Kingdom	For private owner.
Unknown date	Gunboat No. 1	1805-class gunboat			United Kingdom	For Royal Navy.
Unknown date	Gunboat No. 2	1805-class gunboat			United Kingdom	For Royal Navy.
Unknown date	Gunboat No. 3	1805-class gunboat			United Kingdom	For Royal Navy.
Unknown date	Gunboat No. 4	1805-class gunboat			United Kingdom	For Royal Navy.
Unknown date	Gunboat No. 5	1805-class gunboat			United Kingdom	For Royal Navy.
Unknown date	Gunboat No. 6	1805-class gunboat			United Kingdom	For Royal Navy.
Unknown date	Gunboat No. 7	1805-class gunboat			United Kingdom	For Royal Navy.
Unknown date	Iason	Brig		Kherson	Russia	For Imperial Russian Navy.
Unknown date	Isabella	Merchantman	John & Philip Laing	Sunderland	United Kingdom	For J. & P. Laing.
Unknown date	James	Merhantman	John & Philip Laing	Sunderland	United Kingdom	For J. Laing.
Unknown date	Jane	Slave ship		Liverpool	United Kingdom	For Falkner & Co.
Unknown date	Leeds	Merchantman		Quebec City	(United Kingdom of Great Britain and Ireland) Upper Canada	For private owner.
Unknown date	Lord Hobart	Brig	John Ball	Salcombe	United Kingdom	For Mr. Deake.
Unknown date	Manchester	Packet ship		Falmouth	United Kingdom	For Post Office Packet Service.
Unknown date	Marietta	Gunboat	Edward W. Tupper	Marietta, Ohio	United States	For United States Navy.
Unknown date	Minerva	West Indiaman	Brocklebank	Lancaster	United Kingdom	For Stuart Donaldson.
Unknown date	Mohawk	Privateer			France	For private owner.
Unknown date	Neptune	West Indiaman		Lancaster	United Kingdom	For private owner.
Unknown date	Penelope	Brig	John & Philip Laing	Sunderland	United Kingdom	For private owner.
Unknown date	Pilchard	Ballahoo-class schooner	Goodrich & Co.	Bermuda	(United Kingdom of Great Britain and Ireland) Bermuda	For Royal Navy.
Unknown date	Prince of Wales	Sloop		Bombay	India	For British East India Company.
Unknown date	Princess Charlotte	Schooner		Cowes	United Kingdom	For private owner.
Unknown date	Remittance	Full-rigged ship			United States	For private owner.
Unknown date	Resource	Merchantman	Holt & Richardson	Whitby	United Kingdom	For Mr. Harrison.
Unknown date	Shipley	Merchantman		Whitby	United Kingdom	For Shipley, Williams & Co.
Unknown date	Sinclair	Merchantman			United Kingdom	For W. Osborn.
Unknown date	Snapper	Ballahoo-class schooner	Goodrich & Co.	Bermuda	(United Kingdom of Great Britain and Ireland) Bermuda	For Royal Navy.
Unknown date	Union	Slave ship		Liverpool	United Kingdom	For Mr Thompson.
Unknown date	Vengeance	Full-rigged ship			United States	For United States Navy.
Unknown date	Name unknown	Merchantman			United States	For private owner.
Unknown date	Name unknown	Brig			France	For private owner.
Unknown date	Name unknown	Schooner			United Kingdom	For private owner.
