= HMS Curacoa (1809) =

Apollo-class fifth-rate frigate

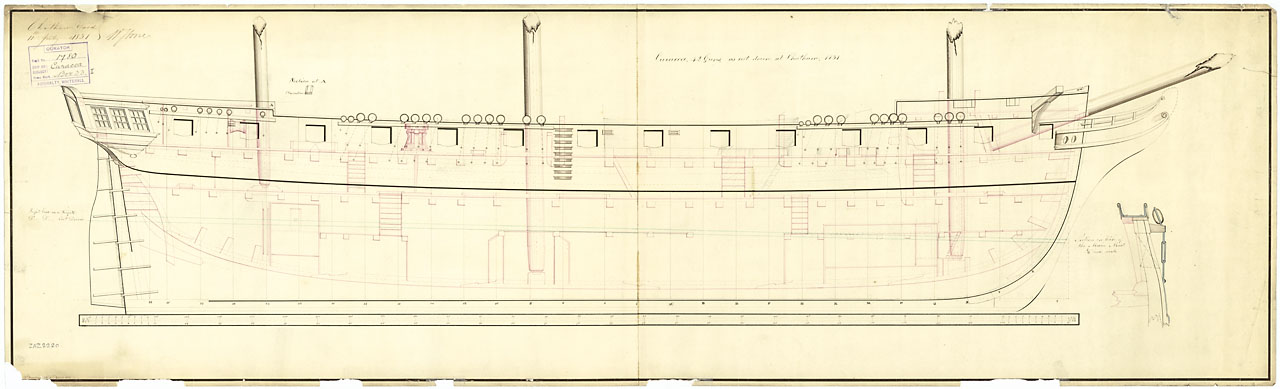
- HMS Curacoa original inboard profile plan

History

United Kingdom
- Name: HMS Curacoa
- Ordered: 1 October 1806
- Builder: Robert Guillaume
- Cost: £18,364
- Laid down: January 1808
- Launched: 23 September 1809
- Commissioned: October 1809
- Fate: Broken up

General characteristics
- Class & type: Apollo-class fifth-rate frigate
- Tons burthen: 952 87/94 (bm)
- Length: 145 ft 2 in (44.2 m) (gun deck); 121 ft 11 in (37.2 m) (keel)
- Beam: 38 ft 4 in (11.7 m)
- Depth of hold: 13 ft 4 in (4.1 m)
- Propulsion: Sails
- Sail plan: Fully Rigged Ship
- Complement: 264
- Armament: Gun deck: 26 × 18-pounder guns; QD: 2 × 9-pounder guns + 10 × 32-pounder carronades; Fc: 2 × 9-pounder guns + 4 × 32-pounder carronades

HMS Curacoa was a fifth-rate 36-gun sailing frigate of the Royal Navy. Ordered in October 1806 and launched in September 1809, she was one of a new series of Apollo-class frigates designed by Sir William Rule in 1798. Curacoa was 952 87/94 tons (bm), armed with a main battery of twenty-six 18 pounders (8.2 kilograms) and carried a complement of 264 men when fully manned.

First commissioned by Captain John Tower, who commanded her through her entire service, Curacoa spent two years on duty around the Channel Islands before being posted to the Mediterranean in 1811, first off the east coast of Italy and then in the Balearic Sea. At the end of the Napoleonic Wars, Curacoa was converted to a 24-gun sixth-rate corvette and sent to South America to assist with the suppression of the slave trade. She was broken up in March 1849.

== Construction and armament ==
HMS Curacoa was one of a new batch of Apollo-class frigates constructed for the Royal Navy between 1803 and 1812, from a 1798 design by Sir William Rule. She was named for the island of Curaçao, at that time commonly known as "Curacoa" by English speakers. The island had been captured by a small British force in January 1807, shortly before construction began.

Built under contract by Robert Guillaume, Curacoa was ordered on 1 October 1806 and her keel was laid down in January 1808 at Northfleet shipyard. Launched on 23 September 1809, her dimensions were: 145 feet 2 inches (44.2 metres) along the gun deck, 121 ft 11 in (37.2 m) at the keel, with a beam of 38 ft 4 in (11.7 m) and a depth in hold of 13 ft 4 in (4.1 m). This made her 952 87/94 tons (bm). She would carry a complement of 264 men when fully manned.

Although classed as a 36-gun fifth rate, Curacoa was armed with a main battery of twenty-six 18 pounders (8.2 kilograms) on her gun deck, two 9 pdr (4.1 kg) on the quarterdeck and two on the forecastle. She also carried 14 32 pdr (14.5 kg) carronades, short lightweight guns with a large bore. They were cheaper to produce and much easier to handle than the equivalent long gun but lacked the accuracy and range. Ten were carried on Curacoa's quarterdeck and four on her forecastle. (Note: The gun-rating of a vessel was the number of long guns it was designed to carry and did not always match its actual armament. Before 1817, carronades were not counted at all unless they were direct replacements for long guns.)

== Service ==
First commissioned under Captain John Tower in October 1809, Curacoa sailed for the Channel Islands. She was in company with HMS Muros and Orestes, when, on 6 July 1810, HMS Amelia recaptured the Swedish ship Bergmasteren. On 25 September 1810, Curacoa captured a French schooner, Aventurier, then while off Lands End on 9 November, a 14-gun French privateer called Venus. Other ships of the squadron; HMS Northumberland, Armada, Argo, Amethyst and Helicon, by virtue of being in sight of Venus, also shared in the prize money for her. A few days later, on 17 October, Curacoa was sailing with Northumberland when Curacoa took a former British brig, Standley. The French cargo she was carrying was sold and the crews of the British ships shared in the proceeds. On 5 November, Curacoa captured Zodiac, another former British brig, and profitted from her salvaged cargo.

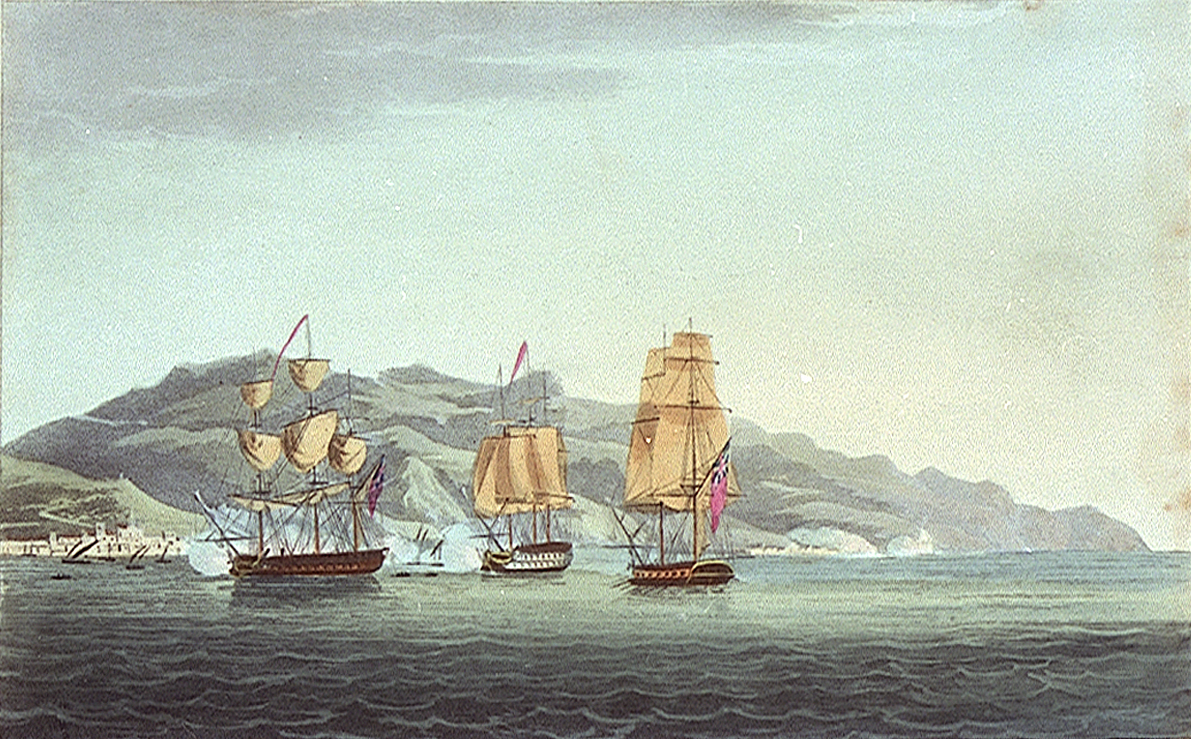
Curacoa, Leviathan, Imperieuse and Eclair, attack a French convoy at Laigrelia, 1812

On 17 November 1811, Curacoa was posted to the Mediterranean. With HMS Leviathan, Imperieuse and Eclair, she formed a squadron under the command of Captain Patrick Campbell that took part in a boat action against a French convoy at Laigueglia. The British ships were patrolling the western coast of Italy when, on 27 June, they encountered 18 French vessels anchored off Alassio and Laigueglia. Although the British managed to put the two batteries on the shore out of action, they were unable to bring off the French vessels which were instead abandoned and destroyed by the British guns.

In January 1812, Curacoa was in a squadron under Commodore Edward Codrington, off the coast of the Spanish province of Barcelona. Curacoa, HMS Rainbow and Papillon were patrolling the Balearic Sea east of Barcelona city, on the night of 26 January, when a division of French soldiers was seen on the shoreline. The three ships opened up a barrage, driving the enemy troops far inshore. Three days later on 29 January, while anchored off Arenys de Mar, word was received of a 7,000-strong French army marching from Barcelona to Mataro. Codrington despatched Curacoa and HMS Merope to the town to discuss with the Governor, Juan de O'Donojú y O'Ryan, how best to mount a defence. The next day the three vessels spotted the French force near Vilassar de Mar and opened fire on it. Despite the arrival of HMS Blake and Papillon, the British could not deter the troops from entering Mataro and partially occupying it.

On hearing that another division of French troops was on its way to Arenys from the north-east, Codrington sent Curacoa and Papillon with food and 11,500 rounds of ammunition for the Spanish irregular forces in the mountains behind the town. These supplies enabled the guerrillas to maintain their position and harass the enemy. Late on 1 February, the French force reached Canet de Mar where it was seen and attacked by boats from Curacoa and Papillon; lack of wind preventing the ships from getting close enough. The action was insufficient however to stop the French marching on to Arenys.

After pillaging the town, the French forces in Mataro withdrew on the morning of 2 February with the intention of joining their compatriots at Arenys. They managed to avoid the attention of the British ships by escaping through some vineyards while it was still dark but this route brought them into conflict with Spanish guerrillas. With the assistance of Curacoa, Papillon and Blake which began a bombardment, the Spanish were able to delay the French but not prevent them from reaching their objective.

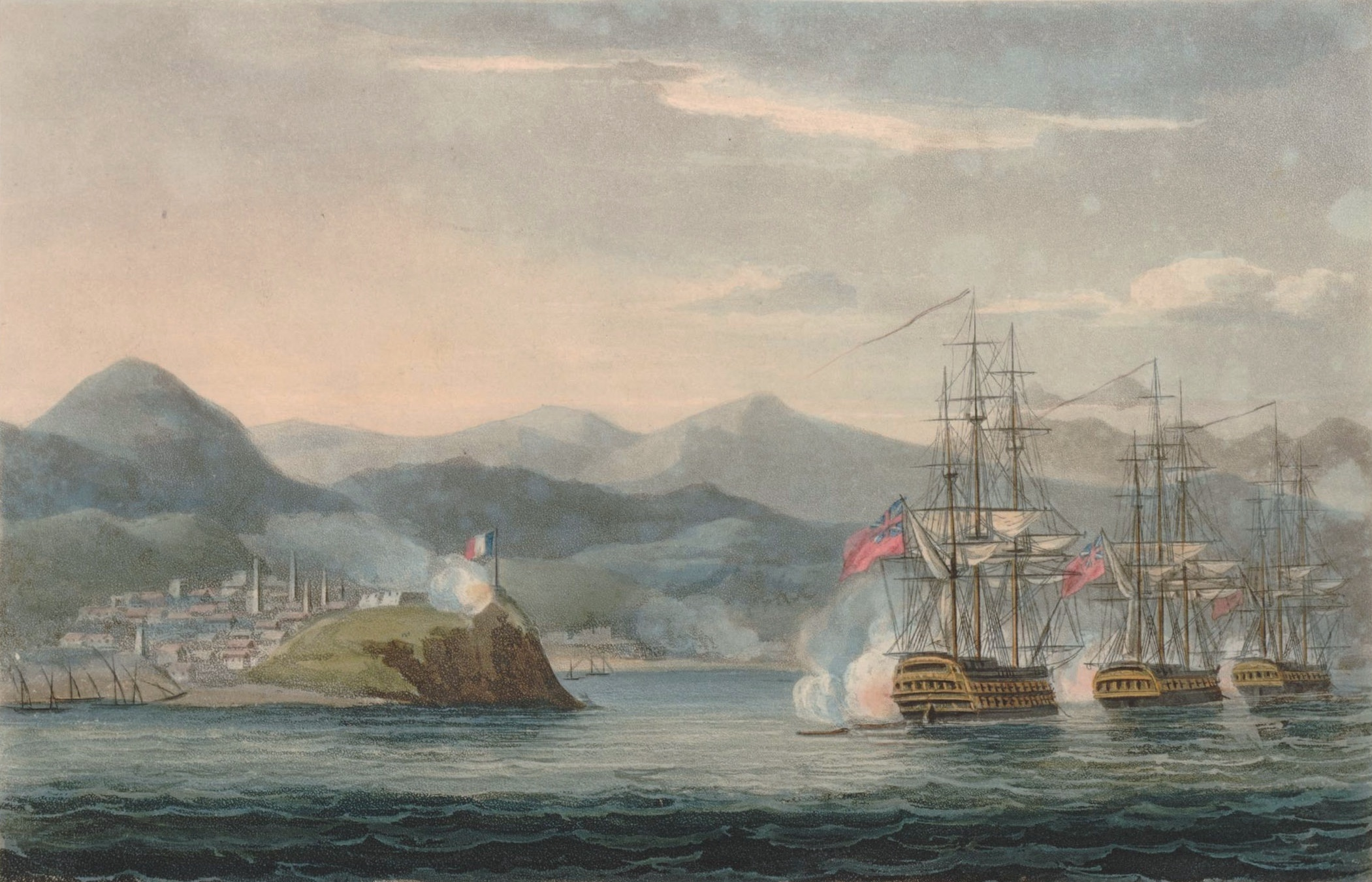
Pembroke, Alcmene and Aigle bombarding Fort Maurizio on 11 April 1814

Curacoa and the 36-gun frigate, HMS Aigle, used boats to land marines and seamen near the harbour of Campo del Porto, Elba, on 20 June 1813. When the batteries protecting the town were over-run and the troops there routed, the French scuttled three of their own ships to prevent them from becoming prizes. The following morning, having returned to the boats, the marines captured a small convoy of three settees and drove the brig protecting them into Portoferraio. Two large feluccas were taken from the town of Mesca in the Gulf of Spezia, on 28 June. Prevented by the wind from using the ships, the British once more took to boats but only succeeded in driving their quarry inshore. Later that evening the wind changed direction and Aigle and Curacoa were able to bombard the town while marines took the feluccas from the beach.

In 1814, Curacoa was in Vice-Admiral Sir Edward Pellew's fleet and took part in operations against the province of Genoa. When a joint British and Sicilian army under Lord William Bentinck occupied the city of Genoa on 19 April, Curacoa was one of the ships sent to provide naval support.

== Post war ==
Curacoa paid off in 1815, when the second Treaty of Paris, signed on the 20 November, ended the Napoleonic wars. Substantial repairs were made to Curacoa at Deptford, between March 1817 and February 1819, after which, in 1822, she was laid up at Woolwich. In February 1831, she was converted to a 24-gun sixth-rate corvette and recommissioned in April for service in the East Indies.

After returning home in 1834, Curacoa was refitted at Chatham Dockyard between February and July 1839, before being sent to South America to assist with the suppression of the slave trade. On 31 March 1840, Curacoa captured Thirteenth of June, a Portuguese brigantine. In 1847, Curacoa sailed for England and on 29 March 1848, she was put up for sale at Sheerness and broken up there in March the following year.
