= HMS Merope =

Brig-sloop of the Royal Navy

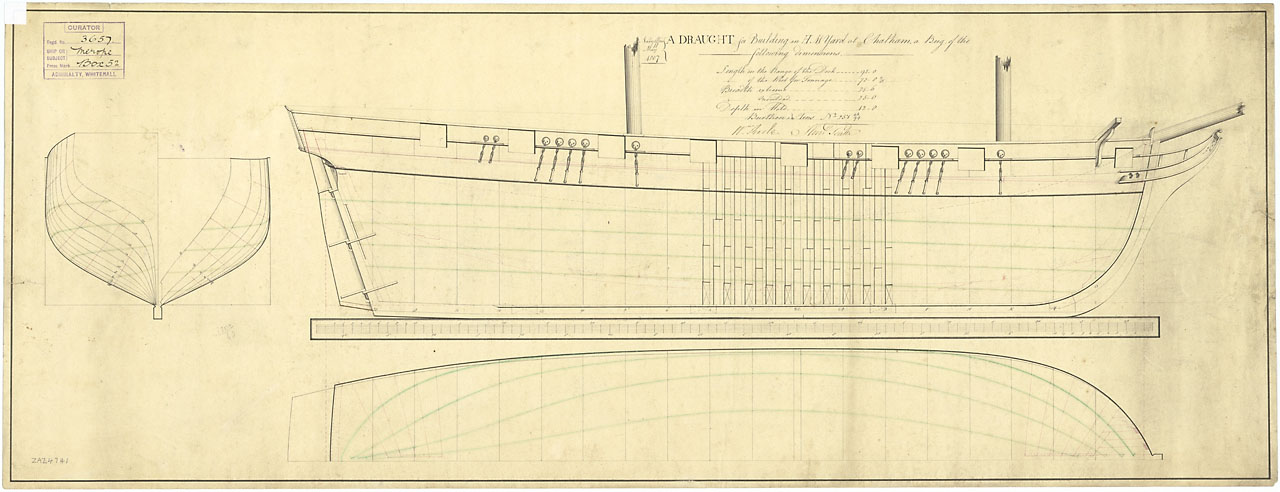
- Merope

History

United Kingdom
- Name: HMS Merope
- Namesake: Merope was one of the seven Pleiades and the protector of sailors
- Ordered: 30 March 1807
- Builder: Chatham Dockyard (M/s Robert Seppings)
- Laid down: November 1807
- Launched: 23 June 1808
- Fate: Sold 1815 for breaking up

General characteristics
- Class & type: Crocus-class
- Type: Brig-sloop
- Tons burthen: 255 62/94 (bm)
- Length: 92 ft 0 in (28.0 m) (gundeck); 72 ft 8 3/4 in (22.2 m) (keel)
- Beam: 25 ft 64 in (9.2 m)
- Depth of hold: 12 ft 8 in (3.9 m)
- Sail plan: Brig rigged
- Complement: 86
- Armament: 2 × 6-pounder bow chasers; 12 × 24-pounder carronades

HMS Merope was a Crocus-class brig-sloop of the Royal Navy, launched in 1808. She served during the Napoleonic Wars and had a relatively uneventful career that ended with her being sold for breaking up in 1815.

== Career ==
Merope was one of ten Crocus-class brig-sloops designed by the British navy for patrol and protection duties. They carried approximately 86 men, and were rated for fourteen cannons. Merope's keel was laid at Admiralty's Chatham Dockyard in November 1807. She was launched in July 1808 as the third of her class. Commander Michael Dod commissioned her in July 1808. He transferred to Monmouth, which he commissioned in the Downs anchorage in October.

Merope was recommissioned in 1810 under Commander John Houston, for the Leeward Islands station of the British fleet. In 1811 she was under the command of Commander Edward Flin, who sailed her for the Mediterranean on 5 March 1812.

=== Action at Tarragona ===
In January 1812 Merope was part of a squadron under Captain Edward Codrington in Blake operating along the north-east coast of Spain in support of Spanish forces during and after the siege of Tarragona (1811). They harassed the French with cannon fire and transported large numbers of reinforcements into the city by sea. Codrington left Merope and Sparrowhawk at Villa Nueva to assist General Joaquín Ibáñez Cuevas, Baron d'Eroles, who planned to march on Tarragona. Around 20 January during a battle for Villa Suca, French dragoons captured Flin, Commander James Pringle of Sparrowhawk, and Lieutenant Cattle of Blake while they were on the beach near Salon. The British officers escaped during the d'Eroles assault on Tarragona. Blake came into Villa Nueva on 25 June and joined Merope in firing on French troops on the road to the west. The British vessels succeeded in disabling three wagons, forcing the French to abandon them.

On 29 January Codrington sent Curacoa, Merope, and Rainbow to Mataró to assist the defenders there against a French force marching from Barcelona. The next day the three vessels observed a French force advancing on Mataró and fired on it near San Juan de Vilasar. The British were not able to prevent the French from entering Mataró and partially occupied it. The French withdrew at daybreak on the following morning, escaping through some vineyards that were out of range of the British vessels and made their way to Arens de Mar (Arenys de Mar).

=== Action off the Peninsula ===
In July 1812 Commander John Charles Gawen Roberts recommissioned Merope for patrolling the Spanish coast. Merope left Portsmouth on 23 July. She then served on Spain's east coast under the orders of Rear-admiral Hallowell supporting the army in Catalonia.

On 13 October 1812 she captured the San Antonio. (Note: A first-class share of the prize money was worth £473 16s 8d; a sixth-class share, that of an ordinary seaman, was worth £11 13s 0d.) Merope was one of seven British warships present at the Spanish capture of Tarragona on 19 August 1813. (Note: A first-class share of the prize money was worth £115 3s 9d; a sixth-class share was worth 19s 8d.)

Lieutenant William Benjamin Suckling, who received his promotion to Commander on 1 July 1814, recommissioned Merope for the Mediterranean. (Note: For more on William Benjamin Suckling see: O'Byrne, William R. (1849). "Suckling, William Benjamin" . A Naval Biographical Dictionary. London: John Murray.)

She sailed to North America in 1815. On her return, in July the Admiralty placed her in ordinary.

== Fate ==
The Navy offered Merope for sale at Portsmouth on 23 March. She sold on 23 November for £930 for breaking up.
