= True Blooded Yankee (privateer) =

History

United Kingdom
- Name: Challenger
- Owner: Admiralty
- Ordered: 23 August 1805
- Builder: William Wallis
- Laid down: January 1806
- Launched: 30 July 1806
- Out of service: 12 March 1811
- Fate: Captured

France
- Name: Challenger
- Fate: Sold

United States
- Name: True Blooded Yankee
- Fate: Seized by Portugal, 1815

United Provinces of the Río de la Plata
- Name: True Blooded Yankee; Carthagenian

General characteristics
- Class & type: Fly-class brig-sloop
- Displacement: 285 16/94 tons Builder's Old Measurement
- Length: 96 feet 2 inches (29.31 m) at gun deck
- Beam: 25 feet 11 1/2 inches (7.91 m)
- Propulsion: Sails
- Sail plan: Brig
- Complement: 180 (True Blooded Yankee)
- Armament: As HMS Challenger:-; 14 x 24-pounder carronades; 2 x 6-pounder chase guns.; As True Blooded Yankee:-; 18 x 18-pounder guns; 2 x long 9-pounder guns

True Blooded Yankee was an American privateer that served during the War of 1812. She was a Fly-class brig-sloop built as HMS Challenger for the British Royal Navy in 1806, which the French captured in 1811 during the Napoleonic Wars.

== Description ==
The ship was 96 feet 2 inches (29.31 m) long at the gun deck. She had a beam of 25 feet 11 1/2 inches (7.91 m) and a hold depth of 11 feet 6 inches (3.51 m). She was assessed at 285 16/94 tons Builder's Old Measurement. Armament was 14 24-pounder carronades and 2 6-pounder chase guns.

== History ==
=== HMS Challenger ===
A Fly-class brig-sloop, HMS Challenger was ordered on 23 August 1805. Built by William Wallis at Blackwall, Middlesex. Her keel was laid in January 1806 and she was launched on 30 July 1806. Fitting out at Woolwich Dockyard began on 30 July 1806 and was completed on 23 August. She entered service under captain William Barnham Ryder. HMS Challenger departed from Harwich, Essex on a cruise on 30 September 1806. She arrived at Sheerness, Kent on 1 October and sailed that day for Portsmouth, Hampshire, arriving at The Downs on 3 October. She sailed on 5 October, and arrived at Portsmouth on 7 October. HMS Challenger departed from Portsmouth on 13 November with a convoy for The Downs. She departed from The Downs on 17 November for a cruise off Havre de Grâce, Seine-Inférieure, France. She returned the next day.

HMS Challenger departed from The Downs on 1 January 1807 in company with HMS Musquito, HMS Phoebe and several other vessels for a cruise on the French coast. In February, she lost her bowsprit and top mast in a gale. She arrived in The Downs on 11 February. She arrived at The Downs in company with HMS Bustler on 31 July. In August, she cruised off Dieppe, Seine-Inférieure in company with HMS Skylark. They arrived at The Downs on 5 August. HMS Challenger arrived at The Downs on 13 October in company with HMS Osprey and HMS Saturn. She then sailed to Sheerness, arriving on 17 October.

HMS Challenger departed from Sheerness on 30 December 1807 with a party of Royal Marines on board. They were to be transferred to HMS Clyde and HMS Princess of Orange in The Downs. She arrived at The Downs on 21 April 1808, having been on a cruise. She sailed from The Downs in company with HMS Bustard, HMS Gluckstadt and HMS Peruvian.

HMS Challenger departed from The Downs in company with HMS Audacious, HMS Blake, HMS Calliope, HMS Dannemarke, HMS Repulse, HMS San Domingo and HMS Theseus for a cruise off Vlissingen, Zeeland, Kingdom of Holland on 10 July 1809. She arrived at Portsmouth in company with HMS Dauntless, HMS Dexterous and HMS Peruvian. In December 1808, she escorted a convoy to Gothenburg, Sweden.

HMS Challenger sailed from Portsmouth for The Downs on 9 January 1809. She departed from Great Yarmouth, Norfolk in company with HMS Onyx on a cruise on 10 June. In July, HMS Challenger was one of 155 ships which were sent on an expedition to Walcheren, Zeeland. They were victualled for four months. She arrived at Portsmouth on 30 September. She departed on 5 October with a convoy for Plymouth, Devon. She arrived back at Portsmouth on 13 October. She departed on 10 December for Cork.

HMS Challenger escorted a convoy of 27 ships from Cork to Barbadoes, assisted by HMS Charybdis. The convoy arrived at Barbadoes on 4 February 1810. She departed with a convoy of 12 ships for Jamaica on 19 February. Ryder was her captain until 20 November 1810.

In January 1811, Goddard Blennerhassett was appointed her captain. HMS Challenger departed from Portsmouth on 8 January. She sailed again on a cruise on 16 January. On 15 March 1811, she was captured off the Île de Batz, Finistère by two French frigates with the loss of two lives. She was taken in to Brest, Finistère Captain Blennerhassett and two passengers were reported to have been held as prisoners of war at Verdun.

=== True Blooded Yankee ===
By March 1813, Challenger had been sold to a Mr. Preble, a Rhode Islander living in Paris, and had been renamed True Blooded Yankee. Her armament was eighteen 18-pounder guns and two 9-pounder long guns. She had a complement of 180 men. She departed from Brest on 1 March. On 6 March, she captured the merchantman Margaret. A prize crew was placed aboard, with orders to take her to Morlaix, Finistère. Margaret was recaptured on 9 March by HMS Nimrod. One of the prize crew placed on board Margaret was John Wiltshire, an Englishman who had been held as a prisoner of war at Arras and Cambrai. He had purchased protection from an American and passed himself off as an American subject named Riley. He was captured when Margaret was captured. Following a trial at the Old Bailey, Wiltshire was found guilty of being in the service of the enemy and was sentenced to death. He was executed at Newgate Prison on 30 July. In March, she captured Aurora and the brig Union. Aurora was on a voyage from Belfast to London. She was taken in to Roscoff. Union was on a voyage from Dublin to Lisbon, Portugal. She was taken in to "Abrevche". Later that month, True Blooded Yankee captured Alfred and Peggy, which was on a voyage from Waterford to Bristol. In May, she entered Dublin harbour and sank the schooner Leopard. In October, she captured Betsey, which was on a voyage from Bristol to the West Indies. Betsey was recaptured on 26 October by HMS Eurotas and taken in to Plymouth. True Blooded Yankee subsequently captured Avon, which was on a voyage from Bristol to Tobago. She also captured a Portuguese ship and a West Indiaman. Avon was recaptured by HMS Eurotas and taken in to Plymouth. In November, she captured a sloop off the Isles of Scilly. On 1 December, she put in to Loch Indaal. She captured Britannia, on a voyage from Liverpool to Westport, County Mayo, Farnham, Friends, on a voyage from Galway to Greenock and Mary. Britannia, Friends and Mary were burnt. Their crews were placed on Farnham, which was released. She also caused four other vessels to run ashore. Another vessel captured that day was the Watson. She was sent to France. On departure, she sailed to the Sound of Mull. HMS Helena was sent in pursuit. On 6 December, she captured Mary off Tory Island, County Donegal. Mary was on a voyage from Liverpool to Limerick. She also captured another vessel, which was sent to France. In December, she captured Castor on a voyage from Newfoundland, British North America to London, Cora, on a voyage from Smyrna, Russia to London. Eliza, on a voyage from Newfoundland to London and Favourite, on a voyage from Buenos Aires, Argentina to London. Their crews were placed aboard Castor which was released. Cora lost a crew member and had seven wounded when she engaged True Blooded Yankee. Cora was taken in to Brest, and was later sent to Boston, Massachusetts, where she arrived in July 1815. On 14 December, she captured Askew in the Atlantic Ocean (49°30′N 8°45′W). Askew was on a voyage from Palermo, Kingdom of Sicily to Belfast. During this cruise, she attacked Bowmore, Islay, firing two shots at the town. The cannon balls were subsequently used in shot put competitions into the 20th century.

True Blooded Yankee captured Diamond on 3 March 1814. Diamond was on a voyage from Gibraltar to Greenock. She was recaptured off Belle Île, Morbihan, France on 6 March by HMS Vengeur. She then captured the Swedish ship Maria Christina, which was on a voyage from Amelia Island, East Florida to Gothenburg. Maria Christina was recaptured by HMS Pactolus. She captured the galiot Hope of Papenburgh, Kingdom of Hanover off Ouessant, Finistère on 21 March. Hope was on a voyage from Bristol to Passages, Spain. She was recaptured by HMS Seahorse. Following a refit at Brest, True Blooded Yankee departed on 21 September for the Bristol Channel, with orders to sink, burn or destroy enemy ships. An order having been given that American vessels would no longer be allowed to refit or victual at French ports, She had been ordered to remain in port, but sailed in defiance of the order. She had a French pilot on board. True Blooded Yankee sank his pilot boat at sea. On 8 October, she plundered the Swedish brig Minerva in the Atlantic Ocean (35°46′N 16°12′W). Minerva was on a voyage from Lanzarote, Canary Islands to Dublin. The French pilot was put aboard Minerva. In November, she captured St. Andrew, which was on a voyage from London to Madeira. She was subsequently recaptured by HMS Albion. Before 11 October, she captured Chance, which was on a voyage from Jersey to Tenerife, Canary Islands. On 11 October, she captured Lord Nelson in the Atlantic Ocean. Lord Nelson was on a voyage from London to Madeira. She was set afire and sunk. Her passengers were landed at Fogo, Cape Verde Islands. She capture Lady Prevose, which was on a voyage from Lisbon to Newfoundland. Lady Prevost was recaptured by HMS Nimrod on 16 December. True Blooded Yankee arrived at Bahia, Brazil on 2 December. She was placed under observation by HMS Albacore. Blockaded, her captain eventually sold her. In May 1815, it was reported that her crew had mutinied and the ship had been seized by the Portuguese Government. She was involved in the Argentine War of Independence, being operated by the independents. She was reported to be refitting in November 1815.

By March 1817, True Blooded Yankee had been renamed Carthagenian. A Spanish prize of hers was lost at Charleston, South Carolina, United States in late March. She was reported to have "recently been off Havana, Cuba" in April. It was understood that she was to go on a cruise to Cádiz, Spain. In November 1817, it was reported that True Blooded Yankee had captured two ships, one of them a Spanish Navy sloop-of-war.

== In popular culture ==
True Blooded Yankee was the subject of a chapter in the novel St. Ives by Robert Louis Stevenson, who died in 1894 before it was completed. The novel was finished by Sir Arthur Quiller-Couch in 1897, who left the chapter out, as he refused to believe that True Blooded Yankee had attacked Bowmore in 1813.

Pottery manufacturers in Staffordshire and printers in Liverpool took the opportunity to commercialise the war. Various items of pottery were produced with images of different ships involved in the war. The Smithsonian Institution in Washington, D.C. holds a pitcher with the image of True Blooded Yankee.
