= French brig Carlotta =

French and British naval brig, wrecked 1812

Carlotta
History

France
- Name: Fiamma
- Builder: Andrea Salvinin, Venice
- Laid down: June 1807
- Launched: 2 December 1807
- Renamed: Carlotta
- Captured: December 1810

United Kingdom
- Name: HMS Carlotta
- Acquired: December 1810 by capture
- Fate: Wrecked January 1812

General characteristics
- Displacement: 200 tons (French)
- Tons burthen: 2048/94 (bm)
- Length: 90 ft 6 in (27.58 m) (overall); 74 ft 8 in (22.76 m) (keel)
- Beam: 22 ft 8 in (6.91 m)
- Depth of hold: 8 ft 2 in (2.49 m)
- Sail plan: Brig
- Complement: 66 (French service)
- Armament: Originally: 8 × 8-pounder guns or 10 × 6-pounder guns; British service: 14 guns

The French brig Carlotta was a brig-rigged corvetta-cannoniera or, corvetta-brig, of 10 guns, launched in 1807 at Venice as Fiamma that served the French Navy as Carlotta. HMS Belle Poule captured her in 1810 and the British Royal Navy took her into service as HMS Carlotta. She was wrecked in 1812.

== Origins ==
Carlotta followed a design by Andrea Salvini and he probably built her; Napoleon was reportedly at her launch. In 1810 she was at Goro-Primaro, the southernmost branch of the river Po.

== Capture ==
On 11 December 1810 Carlotta was sailing from Venice to Corfu when she encountered Belle Poule. Carlotta's captors described her as "La Carlotta Italian brig of war of Ten Guns and One Hundred Men". The Royal Navy took her into service as HMS Carlotta, and Admiral Edward Pellew appointed Lieutenant James Oliver to command her.

Several British vessels shared in the proceeds of her capture. One prize money notice allocated head-money, ordnance stores, and one fourth of the proceeds of the hull to Belle Poule, hull, stores, and ordnance stores to Montague, and the ordnance stores and one fourth of the proceeds of the hull to Acorn. A later notice announced a payment to the officers and crew of Imogen. (Note: A first-class share of the prize money was worth £42 5s 3 3/4d; a sixth-class share, that of an ordinary seaman, was worth 8s 7d.)

== Fate ==
On 26 January 1812 a violent gale, together with a strong current, drove Carlotta onto Cape Passaro, wrecking her. Oliver's exertions in saving a cargo of specie and consequent fatigue aggravated a previous wound, costing him the sight in one eye. Still, in 1813 he was appointed first lieutenant on Sultan.
