= HMS Electra (1806) =

Brig-sloop of the Royal Navy

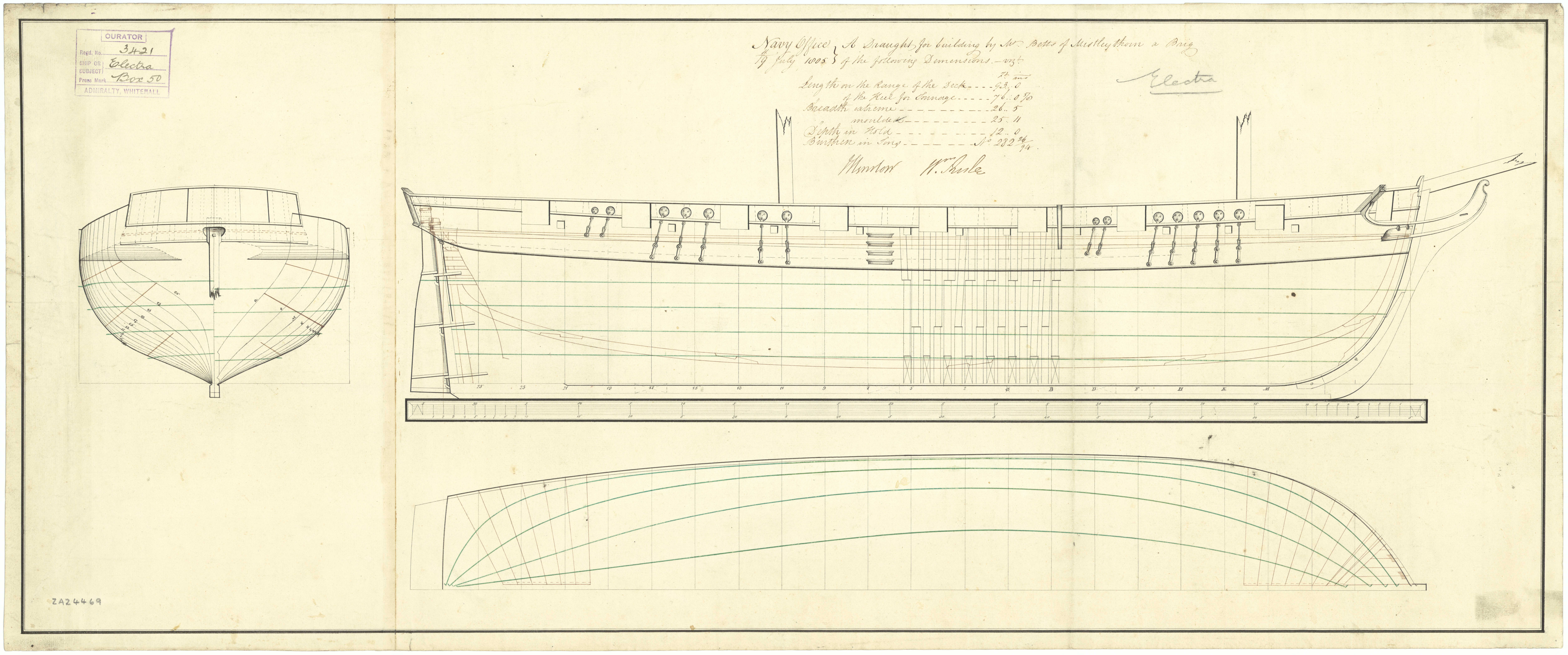
- Electra

History

United Kingdom
- Name: HMS Electra
- Ordered: 19 July 1805
- Builder: James Betts, Mistleythorn
- Laid down: October 1805
- Launched: 23 January 1806
- Commissioned: March 1806
- Fate: Wrecked 25 March 1808; Salvaged and broken up 1808

General characteristics
- Class & type: 16-gun brig-sloop
- Tons burthen: 28477/94 (bm)
- Length: 93 ft 2 in (28.4 m) (overall); 76 ft 3 in (23.2 m) (keel)
- Beam: 26 ft 6 in (8.1 m)
- Depth of hold: 12 ft 0 1/2 in (3.7 m)
- Sail plan: Sloop
- Complement: 95
- Armament: 14 × 24-pounder carronades; 2 × 6-pounder bow guns

HMS Electra was a British Royal Navy 16-gun brig-sloop of the Seagull class launched on 23 January 1806. She was wrecked in 1808.

== Career ==
Electra′s commanding officer, Commander George Trollope, commissioned Electra in March 1806 for operations in the North Sea. He then sailed her for the Mediterranean on 15 November 1807.

On 17 February 1808, Major General John Coape Sherbrooke ordered the evacuation of the British troops at the castle of Scylla (Scilla, Calabria. Italy). Trollope commanded the boats that brought out the troops. British casualties were light.

== Fate ==
On 25 March 1808, Electra was returning to Port Augusta, Sicily, with payroll for the troops on Sicily. As she was working her way into the bay at 8 a.m. she hit the outer edge of a reef. By mid-afternoon all efforts to save her had failed and she was awash. The decision was made to abandon her.

The subsequent court martial faulted Trollope for having tried to enter an unfamiliar port without calling for a pilot and for failing to use a lead. The court martial ordered that Trollope be put at the bottom of the list of commanders. The court martial also reprimanded Lieutenant Richard Connelly for having left the deck while Electra was on the reef.

The Royal Navy salvaged Electra, but then had her broken up at Malta later in 1808.

== Bibliography ==
- Hepper, David J. (2023). British Warship Losses in the Age of Sail, 1649-1860. Seaforth. ISBN 9781399031028.
- Winfield, Rif (2008). British Warships in the Age of Sail 1793–1817: Design, Construction, Careers and Fates. Seaforth. ISBN 978-1-86176-246-7.
