= HMS Violet (1806) =

History

United Kingdom
- Name: HMS Violet
- Acquired: 1806 by transfer
- Commissioned: December 1807
- Fate: Broken up 1812

General characteristics
- Tons burthen: 82 (bm)
- Length: 60 ft 2 3/4 in (18.4 m) (overall); 44 ft 3 5/8 in (13.5 m)
- Beam: 18 ft 2 1/2 in (5.5 m)
- Depth of hold: 8 ft 8 in (2.6 m)
- Sail plan: Brig
- Complement: 30
- Armament: 10 × 12-pounder carronades

Violet was a lugger that the British Royal Navy acquired from the Commissioners of Customs in 1806. She made some small captures before she was broken up in 1812.

Between 11 February and 22 July 1806, the Royal Navy repaired Violet after receiving her from Customs. It had her fitted at Plymouth in November 1807 and commissioned her under Lieutenant Stephen Dods (or Dodd) in December, for the Channel Islands. In 1809 Lieutenant Davenport Sedley replaced Dodd.

In February 1810 Violet detained Buon Consiglia, from the "Streights", and sent her into Fowey.

Violet was in sight on 9 May 1810 when Muros captured Pere de Famille.

Then in early August, Violet sent two small French privateers into Guernsey.

On 11 December 1811 Violet recaptured the schooner Swift and cargo. Swift, Shephard, master, of Hull, had been sailing from Alicante when she fell prey to a French privateer. Violet sent Swift into Portsmouth.

Violet was broken up in 1812.
