= HMS Mercurius =

Brig of the Royal Navy

History

Denmark-Norway
- Name: HDMS Mercurius
- Builder: Stibolt, Bodenhof Plads, Copenhagen
- Launched: 8 June 1806
- Captured: Taken by British at the Battle of Copenhagen (1807)

United Kingdom
- Name: Mercurius
- Acquired: September 1807 by capture
- Fate: Sold, November 1815

General characteristics
- Type: Brig
- Displacement: 169 1/2 tons
- Tons burthen: 30753/94 (bm)
- Length: Overall:94 ft 3 in (28.7 m); Keel:77 ft 4 3/4 in (23.6 m)
- Beam: 27 ft 4 in (8.3 m)
- Depth of hold: 10 ft 3 in (3.1 m)
- Sail plan: Brig
- Complement: Danish:85; British: 100
- Armament: 16 × 24-pounder carronades + 2 × 6-pounder guns

HMS Mercurius was launched at Copenhagen in 1806 for the Dano-Norwegian navy under the name HDMS Mercurius. The British captured her at the Battle of Copenhagen (1807) and took her into service as HMS Mercurius. She spent her entire British career successfully escorting convoys to the White Sea, the Baltic, and every part of the North Sea. She was sold in November 1815 after the end of the Napoleonic Wars.

== Dano-Norwegian Navy ==
Lieutenant-Captain Peter Johan Wleugel was captain of Mercurius in August and September 1807. Her crew consisted of students of the navigation school. Her officers and crew abandoned her at Kalvebod Strand, just south of Copenhagen.

After the British seized her, Mercurius arrived at Chatham 9 November 1807.

== Royal Navy ==
Commander Thomas Renwick was appointed to Mercurius on 18 August 1808, and he commissioned her in September, for the North Sea.

Under Renwick's command Mercurius escorted about 2000 vessels, none of which was either captured or lost. In April 1813, Renwick conducted a fleet of some 400 to 500 vessels through the Sound where they came under continuous fire from Cronenburg Castle.

Renwick captured some 17 vessels in Mercurius.

On 15 March 1809, Mercurius captured Bonne Mere.

On 17 April 1810, Mercurius captured Carolus, L.J. Kramer, master, and Enighied, N. Frius, master.Nightingale was in sight for both captures; Tartar was in sight for the capture of Enigheid. They therefore shared in the proceeds.

On 29 April Mercurius captured Larken, J. Knudsen, and Jupiter, P. Otrog, master.

On 16 July 1810, Mercurius captured Anna Catherina, H. H. Plump, master.

In October 1811 Mercurius captured St. Simeon.

Mercurius shared with Rose, Belette and Reynard the proceeds for the capture on 18 December 1811, of Axel Thomsen and Cecelia Margaretha (or Sicillia Margaretha).

On 2 March 1812, Mercurius captured Johanna Maria. (Note: Johana Maria was of about 81 tons (bm). She and her cargo, consisting primarily of rye, were auctioned off on 28 May 1812, at Leith.)

On 30 June 1812, Mercurius captured three Russian luggers. (Note: A first-class share of the prize money was worth £117 7s 11d; a sixth-class share, that of an ordinary seaman, was worth £3 6s 7½d.) (Note: All three, together with their cargoes, consisting primarily of rye, were auctioned off on 24 December 1812, at Leith. The three ranged in size from 45 to 56 tons (bm).)

On 21 March 1813, Mercurius captured Louise Charlotte de Guldencrone. (Note: A first-class share of the prize money was worth £127 18s 4d; a sixth-class share, that of an ordinary seaman, was worth £3 10s 7½d.)

== Fate ==
Mercurius was paid off in September 1815. The "Principal Officers and commissioners of His Majesty's Navy" offered "Mercurius brig, of 308 ton", lying at Sheerness, for sale on 23 November 1815. She was sold there on that day for £800.
