= HMS Muros (1809) =

Brig-sloop of the Royal Navy

History

United Kingdom
- Name: HMS Muros
- Ordered: 3 May 1808
- Builder: Chatham Dockyard (M/shipwright Robert Seppings)
- Laid down: June 1808
- Launched: 25 October 1809
- Fate: Sold 18 April 1822 for breaking up

General characteristics
- Class & type: Crocus-class brig-sloop
- Tons burthen: 25172/94 (bm)
- Length: Overall:92 ft 1 in (28.1 m); Keel:72 ft 9 1/2 in (22.2 m)
- Beam: 25 ft 6 in (7.8 m)
- Depth of hold: 12 ft 8 in (3.9 m)
- Complement: 86
- Armament: 2 × 6-pounder bow chasers + 12 × 24-pounder carronades

HMS Muros was launched at Chatham Dockyard in 1809. She had a relatively uneventful career though she did participate in one major campaign. She was sold in 1822 for breaking up.

== Career ==
On 26 October 1809, Commander Clement Sneyd commissioned Muros. However, in January, Muros was stranded in Jersey in a gale and was paid off. Still, Lloyd's List reported on 30 January 1810 that the French sloop Eliza had arrived at Falmouth. Muros had captured Eliza as Eliza was taking a cargo to Brest. Then on 2 February 1810, Muros recaptured the brig David. On 5 March Hercules, Jurgen, master, arrived at Plymouth. Muros had captured Hercules as Hercules was sailing from Cherbourg to Morlaix.

Violet was in sight On 9 May 1810 Muros captured Pere de Famille. Violet was in sight. Commander Sneyd received promotion to post captain on 3 April 1811.

Then on 6 July 1811, Muros was in company with Curacoa, Amelia, and Orestes at the recapture of the Swedish ship Bergmasteren. (Note: A first-class share of the salvage money was worth £21 6s 2½d; a sixth-class share, that of an ordinary seaman, was worth 6s 8¼d.)

Muros underwent a small repair at Portsmouth between November 1811 and February 1812. Commander James Aberdour recommissioned Muros in December 1811. She sailed for Newfoundland on 24 June 1812.

War with the United States broke out in July 1812. On 18 August, the American ship Lucia, Heyde, master, arrived at Portsmouth. Muros had captured Lucia as Lucia was sailing from London to New York. Commander Aberdour received promotion to post-captain on 2 December 1812.

Commander Charles Hobart recommissioned Muros in December 1812. She sailed for Newfoundland on 17 May 1813. She served on the Bermuda station. Commander Hobart died on 29 July. She was then on the South America station under Lieutenant Thomas Saville Griffinhoofe, who was promoted to Commander on 20 June 1813. She

Commander George Gosling recommissioned Muros in April 1815. Lloyd's List reported on 12 May 1815 that Muros had recaptured El Joven Francisco, Pacheco, master. The United States privateer Grand Turkhad captured El Joven Francisco as El Joven Francisco was sailing from Rio de Janeiro to Pernambuco.

On 25 April 1815, Commander George Gosling assumed command of Muros.

Muros was one of the many British vessels at the capture of Guadeloupe on 10 August 1815. There she was one of the naval vessels covering the third landing. She ran into Ance la Barque, anchored within grape range of the shore, and succeeded in bringing out a large merchant ship and a sloop, the former mounting two 6-pounders, and both commanded by Buonapartists. (Note: A first-class share of the prize money for the Navy was £30 0s 6½d; a sixth-class share, that of an ordinary seaman, was worth 11s 7½d.)

Muros was laid up at Deptford in April 1816. She was at Woolwich in 1817 and then Deptford again between 1820 and 1822.

== Fate ==
The "Principal Officers and Commissioners of His Majesty's Navy" first offered the "Muros brig," lying at Deptford, for sale on 13 April 1822. Muros was sold on 18 April 1822 to Thomas Pittman for £910 for breaking up.
