= Morning Star (1809 ship) =

History

United Kingdom
- Name: Morning Star
- Builder: United States of America
- Launched: 1805
- Acquired: 1809
- Fate: Last listed in 1833

General characteristics
- Tons burthen: 93, or 95, or 100 (bm)
- Sail plan: Schooner
- Armament: 2 × 6-pounder guns

Morning Star was a schooner launched in 1805 in the United States of America, possibly under another name. From 1809 she sailed under British registry. She sailed to Africa, the Mediterranean, and South America. She was last listed in 1833.

== Career ==
Morning Star first appeared in Lloyd's Register (LR) in 1809.

Year	Master	Owner	Trade	Source
1809	J.Small	L.Williams	Falmouth–Madeira	LR
1810	J.Small; Ledger	Williams	Falmouth–Madeira; London–Senegal	LR
1813	Ledger; Spencer	Williams; Bennett	London–Senegal; London–Teneriffe	LR

In 1813 Daniel Bennett & Son purchased Morning Star.

They sold her the next year.

Year	Master	Owner	Trade	Source
1814	J.Spencer; Fairbotham	Bennett; J.Fisher	London–Teneriffe	LR
1815	Fairbotham; J.Hadgley (or Hoogley)	Fisher	Liverpool–Sicily	LR
1819	J.Hedgley; J.Hogan	Boardman	Liverpool–Naples	LR
1822	J.Hogan; Jones	Boardman; W.Taylor	Liverpool–Malta; Liverpool–Africa	LR
1823	R.Jones; J.White; Chephare	Taylor & Co.	Liverpool–Africa	LR
1824	Chephare	Ramsden	Liverpool–Africa	LR
1827	Ellis	Ramsden	Liverpool–Africa	LR
1828	Ellis; J.Watson	Ramsden	Liverpool–Africa	LR
1829	J.Watson	J.Aken	Liverpool–Montevideo	LR
1830	J.Watson	Holland & Co.	Liverpool–Buenos Aires	LR; repairs 1825 & good repair 1829
1833	Watson	W.Taylor	Liverpool–Africa	Register of Shipping; repairs 1824

== Fate ==
Morning Star was last listed in the registries in 1833. The data in LR was unchanged since 1830.
