= HMS Martin (1805) =

Sloop of the Royal Navy

History

United Kingdom
- Name: HMS Martin
- Ordered: 27 November 1802
- Builder: Benjamin Tanner, Dartmouth
- Laid down: September 1803
- Launched: 1 January 1805
- Fate: Lost, presumed foundered, August 1806

General characteristics
- Class & type: Merlin-class sloop
- Tons burthen: 36780/94 (bm)
- Length: Overall:106 ft 0 in (32.3 m); Keel:87 ft 8 1/4 in (26.7 m)
- Beam: 28 ft 1 in (8.6 m)
- Depth of hold: 13 ft 9 in (4.2 m)
- Complement: 121
- Armament: Upper deck:16 × 32-pounder carronades; QD:6 × 12-pounder carronades; Fc:2 × 12-pounder guns

HMS Martin was launched in 1805 at Dartmouth. Commander Roger Savage commissioned her in February and sailed for the Mediterranean on 18 April.

Between 6 July and 18 August Martin detained and sent into Gibraltar two American vessels: Argus, Chamberlain, from Cadiz to Virginia, and Diana, Simmons, from Malaga to Boston.

Commander Robert Prowse assumed command in January 1806. On 29 March Martin arrived at Plymouth from Malta. She sailed from Falmouth for Lisbon on 3 May and then on to Newfoundland. On 6 May Martin captured the Prussian ship Mercurius.

On 7 July Martin arrived at Plymouth from the St Lawrence River. Martin sailed for Barbados in August 1806 and disappeared. It was presumed that she had foundered with all hands.
