= Neptune (1805 ship) =

History

United Kingdom
- Name: Neptune
- Builder: Lancaster
- Launched: 1805
- Fate: Foundered 4 February 1825

General characteristics
- Tons burthen: 300 (bm)
- Armament: 4 × 12 + 2 × 24-pounder carronades

Neptune, was launched in 1805 as a West Indiaman. A French privateer captured her in 1809 but passengers and some disaffected members of the prize crew recaptured her. She returned to the West Indies trade and foundered on 4 February 1825 while returning to Liverpool from New Orleans.

== Career ==
Neptune first appeared in Lloyd's Register (LR) in 1805.

Year	Master	Owner	Trade	Source
1805	T.Wilson	Mason & Co.	Lancaster–Tortola	LR

Neptune, Wilson, master, sailed from St Thomas on 9 February 1806 in company with Roehampton, Atkinson, master. The two vessels parted company on 15 March in a heavy gale. Neptune arrived at Lancaster. Roehampton apparently foundered as she disappeared from Lloyd's List (LL) and other press reports.

Later in 1806 Neptune was again at Tortola. There she took on part of the cargo of Meanwell, Pewson, master. Meanwell had been on voyage from St Kitts to London when she was condemned at Tortola.

In November 1807 LL reported that Neptune, Wilson, master, had been sailing from Liverpool to St Domingo when she had to put into Lisbon in distress.

Year	Master	Owner	Trade	Source
1809	T.Wilson; Johnson	Mason & Co.	Lancaster–Tortola	LR

=== Capture and recapture ===
The French corvette Mouche, of 16 guns and 145–150 men, left Corunna on 11 April 1809. She then cruised some 100 miles from Scilly in company with a cutter of 10 guns.

According to the report in Lloyd's List, prior to 17 May Mouche captured:

- the Spanish ship Neptune,
- Neptune, Wilson, master, sailing from Liverpool to the West Indies,
- Success, of and for Jersey, from St Michaels,
- Betsey, of Bridport, from the Canaries,
- a Swedish brig, and
- a Portuguese brig.

Mouche put the captured crews aboard Betsey and let them leave.

Mouche appears to have captured two vessels named Neptune, both with Wilson, master. The second Neptune, Thomas Wilson, master, had been sailing from Lancaster to St Thomas when Mouche captured her on 22 April after an action of 45 minutes during which Neptune had several men wounded. After Neptune struck, the French took Captain Thomas Wilson and his crew onto Mouche. They left on board Neptune four British passengers and two boys. The captors put on board a French prize master and 16 Spaniards. Between 22 and 26 April the French plundered Neptune of everything they could, including watches and other personal property belonging to the passengers. On 27 April captor and captive sailed for Corruna, but separated that night in a gale. One of the passengers, Mr. Barrows, understood French and Spanish and realized that several of the Spanish prize crew were disaffected with the French prize master. The British and the disaffected Spaniards took control of Neptune on 1 May. Captain Walters, another of the passengers, took command. Neptune arrived at Madeira on 5 May. There Captain Sager of HMS Raleigh provided assistance. It was expected that Neptune would resume her voyage in a few days.

=== West Indiaman ===
Year	Master	Owner	Trade	Source & notes
1810	J. Johnson	Mason & Co.	London–St Croix	LR
1813	J.Johnson; J.Burney	Mason & Co.	London–St Croix	LR; repairs 1813
1816	J.Burney; Dawson	Mason & Co.	Liverpool–St Thomas	LR; repairs 1813
1818	H.Dawson	Barrows & Co.	London–Tortola	LR; repairs 1813
1822	T.Dawson; J.Dickson	Burrow & Co.	Liverpool–Tortola; Liverpool–New Orleans	LR; repairs 1813

On 2 January 1822 Neptune, Dawson, master, put into Tortola. She had been on a voyage from Liverpool and St Thomas and had sprung a leak three feet abaft the mainmast after running into several days of bad weather two days after leaving Liverpool. She was making 4 inches of water an hour and would have to be hove down. Her cargo was undamaged. By 7 February she had been repaired and was ready to return to sea.

Year	Master	Owner	Trade	Source & notes
1825	J.Dickson	Capt. & Co.	Liverpool	LR; good repair 1824

== Fate ==
Neptune foundered on 4 February 1825 in Cardigan Bay off Barmouth. She was returning from New Orleans, Louisiana to Liverpool.
