= HMS Paulina (1805) =

Brig-sloop of the Royal Navy

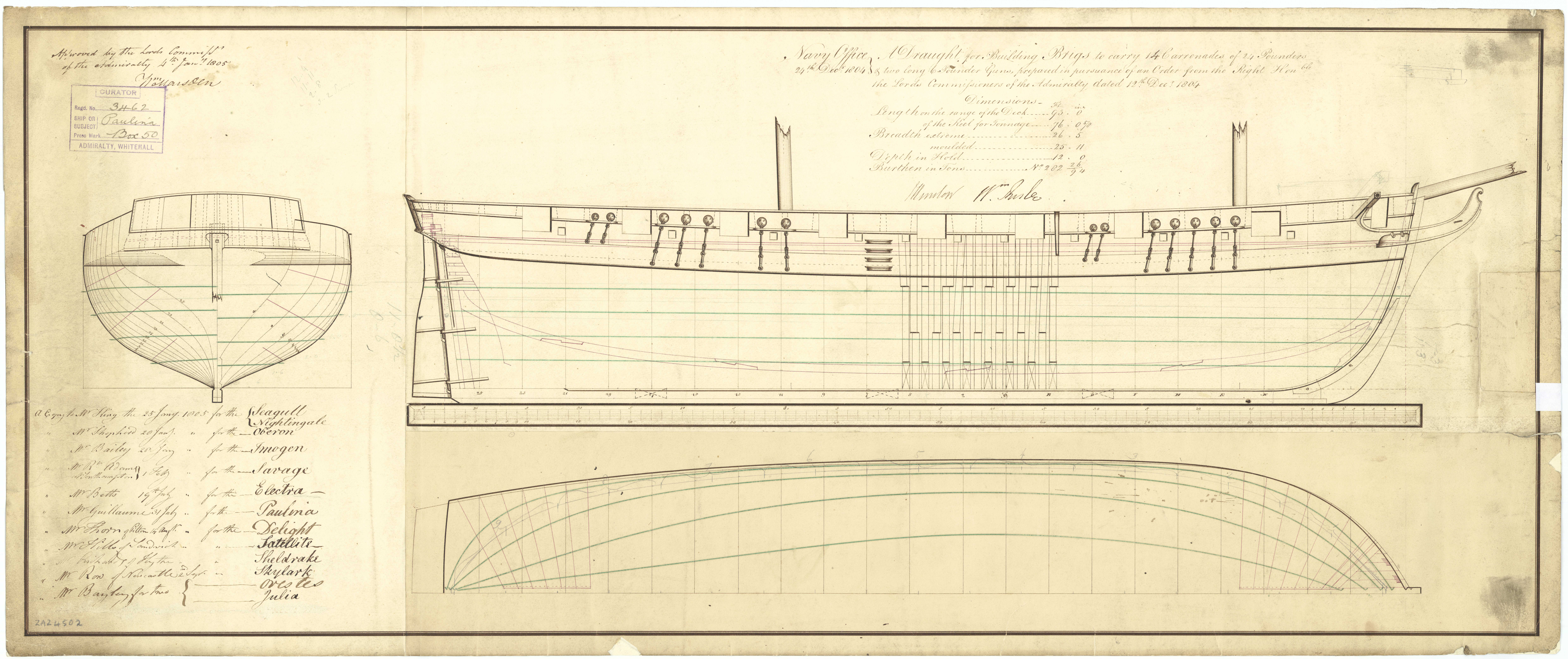
- Paulina

History

United Kingdom
- Name: HMS Paulina
- Ordered: 11 July 1805
- Builder: Robert Guillaume, Northam
- Laid down: August 1805
- Launched: 17 December 1805
- Fate: Sold 1816

General characteristics
- Type: 16-gun brig-sloop
- Tons burthen: 286 87/94 (bm)
- Length: 93 ft 4 1/2 in (28.5 m) (overall); 76 ft 6 7/8 in (23.3 m) (keel)
- Beam: 26 ft 6 1/2 in (8.1 m)
- Depth of hold: 12 ft 0 in (3.7 m)
- Sail plan: Sloop
- Complement: 95
- Armament: 14 × 24-pounder carronades; 2 × 6-pounder bow guns

HMS Paulina was a British Royal Navy 16-gun brig-sloop of the Seagull class launched in December 1805 for cruising. She had a relatively uneventful career before she was sold in 1816.

== Career ==
Commander John Richard Lumley commissioned Paulina in January 1806 for cruising. On 10 April she shared with HMS Jamaica in the capture of the Algema Belang. On 8 May Paulina and Quebec were in company and shared in the capture of the Constantia. On 28 May Paulina and Quebec were again or still in company and shared in the capture of the Frau Geziner. (Note: A first-class share of the prize money was worth £4 11s 2 1/4d; a fifth-class share, that of a seaman, was worth 9d.) Then on 29 June Paulina was in company with Flora when she captured the Die Gebroeders, Ocken, master. (Note: A first-class share of the prize money was worth £52 15s 8d; a fifth-class share was worth 8s 1 3/4d.)

In January 1807 she served with Sir John Stopford's squadron in the North Sea. On 22 August she was in company with Zebra when they captured the Danish vessel Sally. The next day Paulina was one of six British warships that shared in the capture of the Danish vessel Speculation. Then in September Paulina was part of the fleet under Admiral Gambier that attacked Copenhagen. (Note: The prize money for an able seaman was £3 8s 0d.)

Lumley sailed her for the Mediterranean on 13 February 1808. Commander Westby Perceval replaced Lumley in 1809. Perceval sailed Paulina for the Mediterranean on 4 September 1812.

In April 1813 Commander Rowland Mainwaring took command, again for the Mediterranean. There he obtained restitution of two merchant vessels that an American privateer had taken to Tripoli. Paulina remained at Tripoli, preventing the privateer from escaping and committing further depredations, until the cessation of hostilities between the United States and Britain.

== Fate ==
Paulina was paid off in 1815. The Navy offered her for sale on 18 April 1816 at Deptford. She was sold there on 30 May 1816 for £700.
