= Resource (1805 ship) =

UK merchant ship 1805–1810

History

United Kingdom
- Name: Resource
- Owner: 1805: Michael & James Harrison; 1810: Morsom
- Builder: Holt and Richardson, Whitby
- Launched: 1805
- Fate: Lost 1810

General characteristics
- Tons burthen: 296, or 297 (bm)
- Length: 97 ft 3 in (29.6 m)
- Beam: 27 ft 2 in (8.3 m)
- Armament: 6 × 4-pounder guns
- Notes: Part old materials

Resource was launched at Whitby in 1805. She was lost in 1810.

== Career ==
Resource first appeared in the Register of Shipping (RS) in 1806.

Year	Master	Owner	Trade	Source
1806	Harrison	Harrison	Whitby–Shields	RS

Resource first appeared in Lloyd's Register (LR) in 1810.

Year	Master	Owner	Trade	Source
1810	J.Davis	Morsom	London–Martinique	LR

== Fate ==
Resource was lost on 16 March 1810 near Terceira Island as she was returning to London from Martinique. Her crew was saved.
