= HMS Oberon (1805) =

Brig-sloop of the Royal Navy

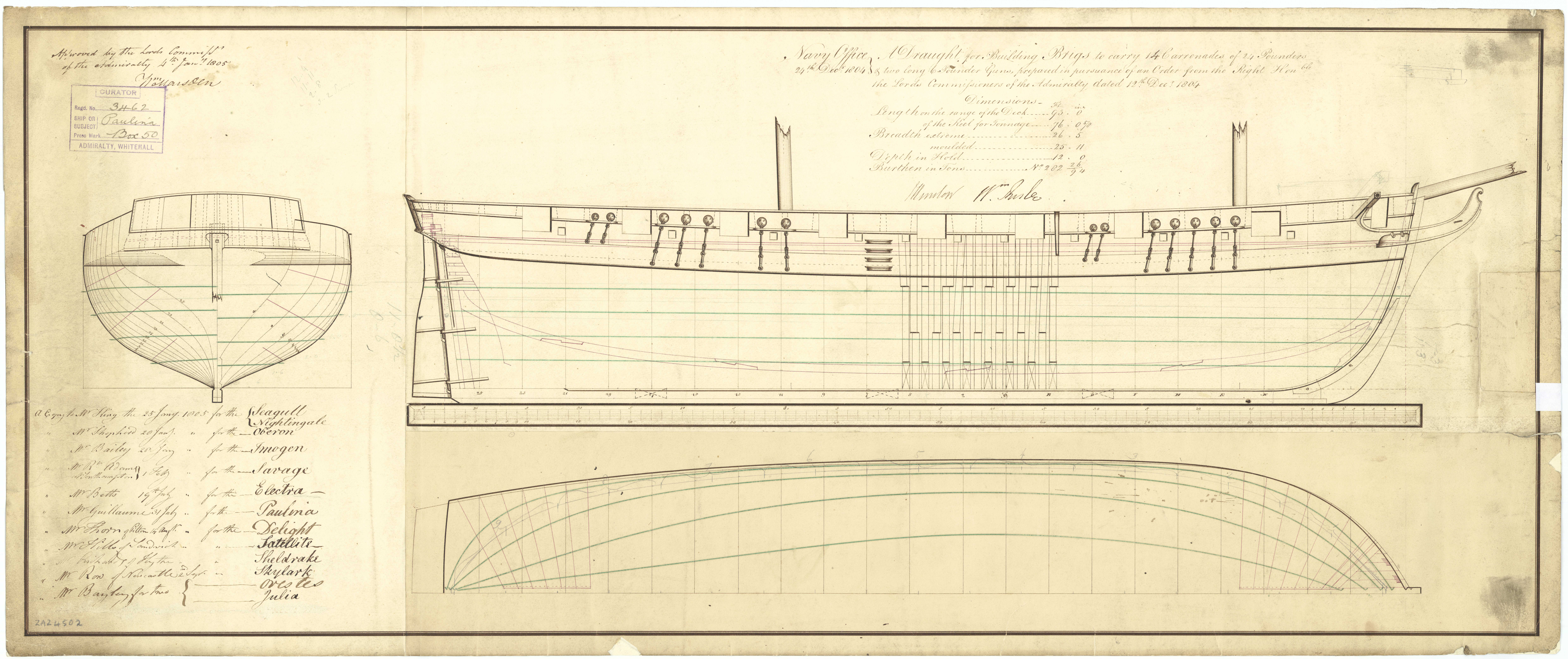
- Oberon

History

United Kingdom
- Name: HMS Oberon
- Ordered: 12 December 1804
- Builder: James Shepherd Shipyard, Kingston upon Hull
- Laid down: March 1805
- Launched: 13 August 1805
- Commissioned: September 1805
- Decommissioned: 1814
- Fate: Broken up, May 1816

General characteristics
- Type: 16-gun brig-sloop
- Tons burthen: 282 64/94 bm
- Length: 93 ft 2 in (28.40 m) (overall); 75 ft 11 in (23.14 m) (keel)
- Beam: 26 ft 5 1/2 in (8.065 m)
- Depth of hold: 11 ft 11 1/2 in (3.645 m)
- Armament: 14 × 24-pounder carronades (2 more added later); 2 × 6-pounder bow chasers

HMS Oberon was a 16-gun brig-sloop of the Seagull class built at Kingston upon Hull and launched in 1805. She was constructed at the James Shepheard Shipyard, Sutton.

== Service ==
She was commissioned in September 1805 under her first commander, John Bushby. However from January 1806 she was under Commander George Manners Sutton off the Downs, in the North Sea. On 6 June 1806 she was in company with Earnest when they captured the Yonge Heinrick H.H. Berg, master.

On 13 November 1807 she gave chase to the French privateer lugger Ratifia, capturing her after four hours, some 30 miles (48 km) east of Lowestoft. The Ratifia commanded by Lieutenant Gilbert Laforeste, had been carrying 14 guns, but at the time had only two mounted for action, the rest being in the hold. She had sailed on 9 November from Delfzijl, on the Ems but had not made any captures before being taken by the Oberon. Captain Sutton sailed her to the Yarmouth Roads and landed 38 prisoners.

On 5 December 1808 Oberon recaptured the Prince of Wales. Sutton removed to Derwent in April 1810, and by May 1810 the Oberon was off the Downs again, commanded by John Murray. On 4 May Oberon was in company with the gun-brig Furious when she recaptured the Galen.

Oberon moved to Leith in 1812. On 23 October, Oberon, Clio, and Chanticleer detained the Jonge Henrick. The next day, Clio and Oberon captured the Danish privateer Wegonsende. The same vessels were also involved in the capture of the privateer Stafeten on 24 December. Prize money for Wegonsende was paid in August 1816. (Note: A first-class share was worth c.£4 13s 7d; a sixth-class share, that of an ordinary seaman, was worth 2s 6d. e)

On 18 March 1813 Oberon sailed to search for two American schooners, suspected to be privateers, cruising between Shetland and Norway in the hope of intercepting British whalers returning from Greenland waters. Oberon met the Whitby whaler Esk on 20 March, but the Esk reported that she had not seen any suspicious vessels. Oberon continued cruising until Saturday 3 April, before entering the Sound at Lerwick at 10pm, where she again met the Esk, which was sheltering from storms and adverse winds.

In 1814 Oberon sailed to the Baltic.

== Fate ==
Oberon paid off from service into ordinary in 1814 at Sheerness. She was first offered for sale on 9 February 1815, and then broken up there in May 1816.
