= HMS Fly (1805) =

UK naval brig-sloop (1805–1812)

History

United Kingdom
- Name: HMS Fly
- Ordered: 4 January 1805
- Builder: [Nicholas] Bools & [William] Good, Bridpoort
- Laid down: March 1805
- Launched: 24 October 1805
- Commissioned: January 1806
- Fate: Wrecked 28 February 1812

General characteristics
- Class & type: Fly-class brig-sloop
- Tons burthen: 28579/94 (bm)
- Length: Overall:96 ft 4 in (29.4 m); Keel:79 ft 9 in (24.3 m)
- Beam: 25 ft 11 1/2 in (7.9 m)
- Depth of hold: 11 ft 6 in (3.5 m)
- Complement: 94
- Armament: 16 × 24-pounder carronades + 2 × 6-pounder bow chasers

HMS Fly was launched in 1805. In 1807 she participated in one major naval campaign. She was wrecked on 28 February 1812 at Anholt Island in the Kattegat.

== Career ==
Captain Henry Vaughan commissioned Fly in January 1806. Commander John Thompson replaced Vaughan in February in the Downs.

In June and July 1807 Fly took part in the British invasions of the River Plate. Captain Thompson was mentioned in letters in the London Gazette for his role in positioning the gun-brigs to provide support for the landing of troops.

On 16 January 1808 Fly arrived back at Portsmouth.

On 31 October 1808 a French privateer captured Concord, Vaux, master, of Sunderland. Fly recaptured Concord and brought her into Portsmouth.

Commander Thompson was promoted to post captain on 21 October 1810. Commander Manley Hall Dixon replaced Thompson until Dixon was promoted to post captain on 26 June 1811.

Commander John Skekel took command of Fly on 26 June 1811. He transferred to Gluckstadt. His replacement aboard Fly was Commander Henry Higman, who transferred from Gluckstadt.

On 2 November 1811, Fly towed into Aberdeen Solomon, Grocow, master, which had been on her way from Riga when she'd been dismasted. (Note: Solomon, J.Gronou, master, of 135 tons (bm), had been launched at Mecklenburg in 1807.)

== Loss ==
Fly was part of a British squadron sailing in the north-east of the Kattegat on he morning of 28 February 1812. When the island of Anholt was sighted, and bearings taken on the lighthouse there, Commander Higman expressed his concerns to the two pilots, who assured him that Fly was not in any danger of grounding. At around 1p.m., as Fly tacked to follow HMS Pyramus, Fly grounded. Efforts to get her off were futile until 2p.m. on the 29th, when she suddenly floated free and drifted into deep water. She started to take on water because of the numerous leaks that her grounding had caused. The crew transferred to other ships of the squadron, with Commander Higman setting fire to Fly before he too left. The subsequent courtmartial reprimanded the pilots and ordered them mulcted of all pay due.

Fly had wrecked on the Knobber Reef, a narrow spit of sand and large boulders that extends 4.4 miles (7.1 km) from the eastern end of Anholt Island.
