= Fly-class brig-sloop =

Class overview
- Name: Fly-class brig-sloop
- Operators: Royal Navy
- In service: 1805 - 1816
- Completed: 7

General characteristics
- Type: Brig-sloop
- Tons burthen: 281 85/94 (bm)
- Length: 96 ft 0 in (29.3 m) (gundeck); 79 ft 5 in (24.2 m) (keel)
- Beam: 25 ft 1 in (7.6 m)
- Depth of hold: 11 ft 6 in (3.5 m)
- Sail plan: Brig-rigged
- Complement: 94
- Armament: 2 × 6-pounder chase guns; 14 × 24-pounder carronades (Note: A further two 24-pounder carronades were added later to make 16.)

The Fly class were built for the Royal Navy as a class of 16-gun brig-sloops; two 6-pounder guns on trucked gun-carriages towards the bows, and eight pairs of slide-mounted 24-pounder carronas along the broadsides. An extra two carronades were added soon after completion, so giving them 18 guns in practice (but the seven vessels remained officially classed as 16 guns). The class was designed by one of the Surveyors of the Navy - Sir John Henslow - and approved in 1805. The Admiralty ordered five vessels to this design in January 1805, 23 days after it had ordered the same quantity of the similar Seagull class to a comparative design by William Rule, the other Surveyor of the Navy; it ordered two more Fly class in August 1805, although this final pair were planked with hulls of pitch pine ("fir") rather than the normal oak used in the first five.

== Vessels ==
In the following table, the Fly-class brig-sloops are listed in the order in which they were instructed to be built (i.e. order dates).

Name	Builder	Ordered	Laid down	Launched	Fate
Kite	Matthew Warren, Brightlingsea	4 January 1805	March 1805	13 July 1805	Sold for breaking 14 December 1815
Sparrow	John Preston, Great Yarmouth	4 January 1805	March 1805	29 July 1805	Sold for breaking 17 October 1816
Fly	Nicholas Bools & William Good, Bridport	4 January 1805	March 1805	24 October 1805	Wrecked off Anholt island on 28 February 1812
Raven	Matthew Warren, Brightlingsea	4 January 1805	March 1805	12 August 1805	Sold for breaking 18 September 1816
Wizard	Thomas Sutton, Ringmore (Devon)	4 January 1805	April 1805	November 1805	Sold for breaking 17 October 1816
Goshawk	William Wallis, Blackwall	23 August 1805	April 1806	17 July 1806	Wrecked off Barcelona 21 November 1811
Challenger	William Wallis, Blackwall	23 August 1805	January 1806	30 July 1806	Captured by French off Île de Batz 12 March 1811
