= HMS Nightingale (1805) =

Brig-sloop of the Royal Navy

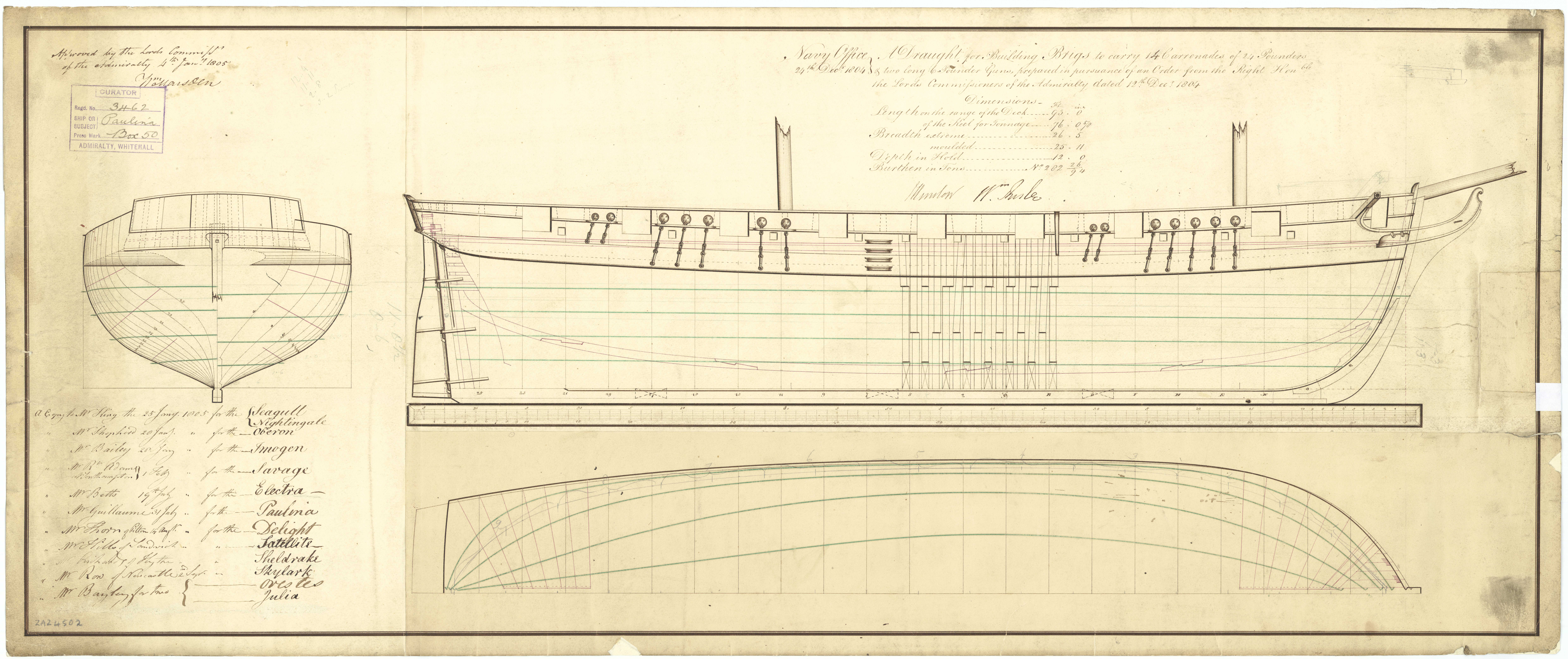
- Nightingale

History

United Kingdom
- Name: HMS Nightingale
- Ordered: 12 December 1804
- Builder: John King, Dover
- Laid down: April 1805
- Launched: 29 July 1805
- Fate: Sold 1815

United Kingdom
- Name: Nightingale
- Acquired: 1815
- Fate: Last listed 1829

General characteristics
- Type: 16-gun brig-sloop
- Tons burthen: 28426/94, or 293, or 296 bm
- Length: 93 ft 1 1/4 in (28.4 m) (overall); 76 ft 1 1/4 in (23.2 m) (keel)
- Beam: 26 ft 6 in (8.1 m)
- Depth of hold: 12 ft 0 in (3.7 m)
- Sail plan: Sloop
- Complement: 95
- Armament: 14 × 24-pounder carronades + 2 × 6-pounder bow guns

HMS Nightingale was a 16-gun brig-sloop of the Seagull class of the British Royal Navy, launched in July 1805. She served during the Napoleonic Wars, primarily in the North Sea, where she captured a number of merchant vessels. The Navy sold her in 1815. She then became a merchantman, trading across the Atlantic, particularly between Liverpool and South America. She was last listed in 1829.

== Royal Navy ==
In August 1805 Commander William Wilkinson commissioned Nightingale for the North Sea. Nightingale was in company with Texel and Lynx on 6 April when Texel captured the Einigheid. (Note: An earlier prize money notice referred to Nightingale as an ordnance store ship.) That same day the same three British ships, together with the hired armed vessels Norfolk and Chapman, captured the Jonge Ebeling, Freundschaft, and Morgenstern. (Note: A first-class share of the prize money was worth £10 1s 1d; a fifth-class share, that of a seaman, was worth 1s 7½d.) Six days later Nightingale captured the Prussian ship Frou Gesiner. The capture of the Twee Gebroders followed on 26 April. Then Nightingale captured the Prussian ships Jonge Gerrite, and De Drie Gebroeders on 23 May.

On 24 January 1807, Nightingale arrived at Edinburgh from Tunningen with news of a French defeat north of Warsaw. In the autumn Nightingale was present at the second battle of Copenhagen. (Note: The prize money for an able seaman was £3 8s 0d.) On 20 October she received orders to accompany a small squadron that would escort the transport ships back to Yarmouth. She carried Captain the Honourable Charles Paget, of Cambrian. He had taken up Admiral Gambier's offer to let him return to Britain with the duplicate despatches announcing Denmark's capitulation.

On 25 July 1809, Nightingale captured the Danish vessel Emanuel. That same day she captured Cutter No 16.

On 8 August three Danish vessels arrived at Leith. They were prizes to Naiad, Nightingale, and Snake.

Then on 16 August Nightingale captured the Danish vessel Transport No 52. (Childers was in company at the capture of Transport No. 52.) Lastly, on 12 October, she captured the Helena Maria.

April 1810 saw Nightingale capture five vessels: Martini Jacobi, C. Stysring, master (15 April), Godes Fisne, A. Brede, master (18 April), Amicitia, Paul Paulson, master, (17 April), Magneten, H. Kilrub, master, (21 April), and a sloop, No. 60, name unknown (21 April. Nightingale was also in sight on 17 April when Mercurius captured Carolus, L.J. Kramer, master, and Enighied, N. Frius, master. That same day Nightingale was in company with Tartar when they captured Amicitia, Paul Poulson, master.

Commander John Eveleigh replaced Wilkinson in November 1810. Nightingale and Forward were in company on 12 April 1811 when they captured Caroline and Berentine.

Commander Christopher Nixon replaced Eveleigh in early 1812. Rifleman and Nightingale, under Nixon's command, were in company when they captured the vessels Liebe (27 February 1812), Maria Dorothea (7 March), Anna Serina (9 March) and Bodel Maria (24 March). Then on 19 May Rifleman and Nightingale were again in company when they captured the Palmtract.

On 29 January 1813, Nightingale captured the American ship Calumet, of 187 tons bm, which had been carrying a cargo of tobacco from Boston to Marstrand. Nightingale sent her into Leith. Then on 9 March 1813, Nightingale was in company with Brev Drageren when they captured the Danish sloop Enigheiden. (Note: A sixth-class share of the prize money was worth 4s 10½d. At a second payment in December 1817, a first-class share was worth £12 16s 7¼d; a sixth-class share was worth 4s 10½d.) On 11 September Nightingale was at Leith receiving a 4-inch false keel.

=== Disposal ===
The Navy put Nightingale up for sale on 23 November 1815 at Sheerness. She was sold that day for £810.

== Merchantman ==
Nightingale first appeared in Lloyd's Register (LR) in 1816 with D.Gray, master, Denniston, owner, and trade London–Charleston.

Year	Master	Owner	Trade	Source
1820	D.Munn	Denniston & Co.	Liverpool–Buenos Aires	LR
1825	Shannon	Captain & Co.	Liverpool–Rio de Janeiro	LR

== Fate ==
Nightingale was last listed in LR in 1829 with unchanged information.
