= Seagull-class brig-sloop =

1805 class of British brig-sloops

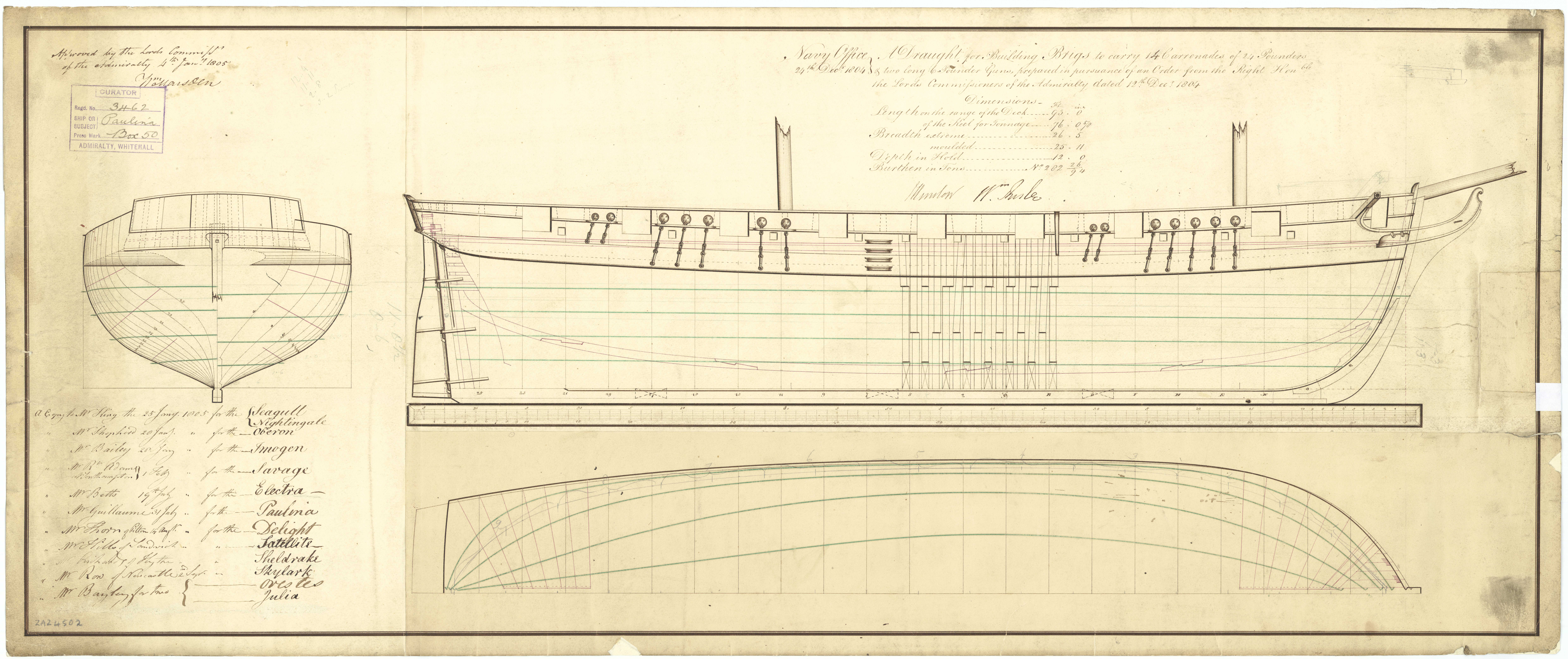
- Drawing showing the body plan with stern board outline, sheer lines with midship framing and scroll figurehead, and longitudinal half-breadth for the Seagull-class ships

Class overview
- Name: Seagull-class brig-sloop
- Operators: Royal Navy
- In service: 1805–1819
- Completed: 13

General characteristics
- Type: Brig-sloop
- Tons burthen: 282 36/94 bm
- Length: 93 ft (28.3 m) (gundeck); 76 ft (23.2 m) (keel)
- Beam: 26 ft 5 in (8.1 m)
- Depth of hold: 12 ft (3.7 m)
- Sail plan: Brig-rigged
- Complement: 95
- Armament: As built: 2 × 6-pounder guns as chase guns; 14 × 24-pounder carronades; Later: 2 × 6-pounder guns as bow chasers; 16 × 24-pounder carronades

The Seagull class were built as a class of thirteen 16-gun brig-sloops for the Royal Navy, although an extra 2 carronades were added soon after completion. The class was designed by one of the Surveyors of the Navy - Sir William Rule - and approved on 4 January 1805. Five vessels to this design were ordered in December 1804; eight more were ordered in the summer of 1805.

== Armament ==
Unlike the larger Cruizer-class brig-sloops, whose main battery was composed of 32-pounder carronades, the Seagull class (and the similar Fly-class brig-sloops designed by Rule's co-surveyor - Sir John Henslow) were armed with a main battery of 24-pounder slide-mounted carronades.

== Ships ==
| Name | Builder | Ordered | Laid down | Launched | Fate |
| Seagull | John King, Dover | 12 December 1804 | February 1805 | 1 July 1805 | Captured 1808; decommissioned from Norwegian navy 1817 |
| Oberon | James Shepheard, Hull | 12 December 1804 | March 1805 | 13 August 1805 | Broken up May 1816 |
| Imogen | Jabez Bailey, Ipswich | 12 December 1804 | April 1805 | 11 July 1805 | Sold for breaking on 3 April 1817 |
| Nightingale | John King, Dover | 12 December 1804 | April 1805 | 29 July 1805 | Sold 23 November 1815; mercantile service to c.1829 |
| Savage | Robert Adams, Chapel (Southampton) | 12 December 1804 | April 1805 | 30 July 1805 | Sold for breaking 6 March 1819 |
| Skylark | William Row, Newcastle | 19 June 1805 | November 1805 | February 1806 | Grounded 3 May 1812 west of Boulogne; burnt to avoid capture. |
| Paulina | Robert Guillaume, Northam (Southampton) | 11 July 1805 | August 1805 | 7 December 1805 | Sold for breaking 30 May 1816 |
| Delight | Richard Thorne, Fremington (near Barnstaple) | 12 July 1805 | September 1805 | June 1806 | Captured 31 January 1808 while stranded on the coast of Calabria. |
| Orestes | Jabez Bailey, Ipswich | 16 July 1805 | August 1805 | 23 October 1805 | Sold for breaking 6 March 1817 |
| Electra | James Betts, Mistleythorn (near Manningtree) | 19 July 1805 | August 1805 | 21 January 1806 | Wrecked 1808; salved but broken up later that year at Malta |
| Julia | Jabez Bailey, Ipswich | 30 July 1805 | October 1805 | 4 February 1806 | Wrecked at Tristan de Cunha 2 October 1817 |
| Satellite | Thomas Hills, Sandwich | 7 August 1805 | September 1805 | March 1806 | Foundered 19/20 December 1810 |
| Sheldrake | Mark Richards, Hythe | 30 August 1805 | October 1805 | 21 March 1806 | Sold for breaking 6 March 1816 |
