= HMS Savage (1805) =

Brig-sloop of the Royal Navy

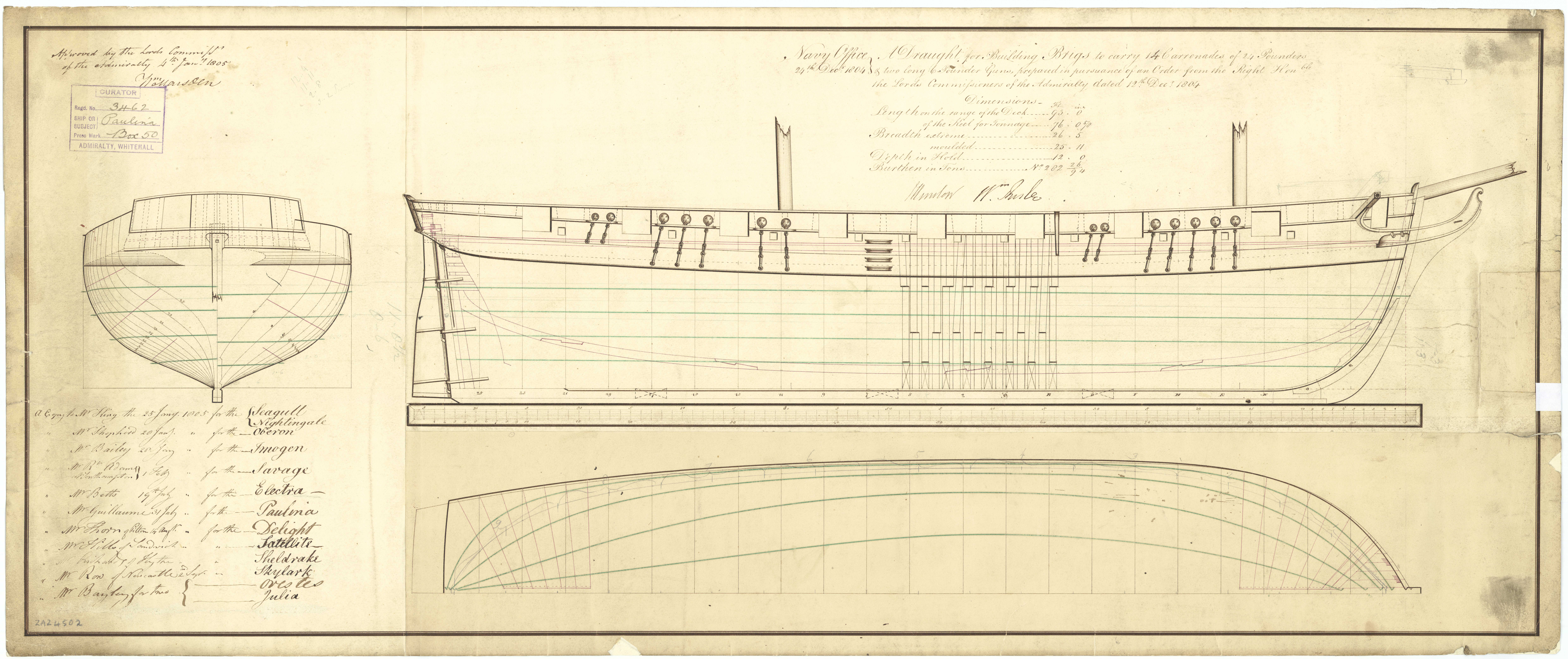
- Savage

History

United Kingdom
- Name: HMS Savage
- Ordered: 12 December 1804
- Builder: Robert Adams, Chapel (Southampton)
- Laid down: April 1804
- Launched: 30 July 1805
- Fate: Sold 1819

General characteristics
- Type: 16-gun brig-sloop
- Tons burthen: 28854/94 bm
- Length: 93 ft 6 in (28.5 m) (overall); 76 ft 1 1/4 in (23.2 m) (keel)
- Beam: 26 ft 7 1/2 in (8.1 m)
- Depth of hold: 12 ft 0 in (3.7 m)
- Sail plan: Sloop
- Complement: 95
- Armament: 14 × 24-pounder carronades; 2 × 6-pounder bow guns

HMS Savage was a 16-gun brig-sloop of the Seagull class of the British Royal Navy, launched in July 1805. She served during the Napoleonic Wars and captured a privateer. She was grounded in 1814 but was salved. The Navy sold her in 1819.

== Career ==
Commander James Wilkes Maurice arrived in Liverpool on 3 August 1805 with dispatches after his courageous, though ultimately unsuccessful, defence of Diamond Rock. The Admiralty greeted him warmly, and within the month, he was tasked with commissioning the newly launched sloop Savage for the Irish Station. While fitting her out at Portsmouth and assembling a crew, Admiral Lord Nelson met with Maurice and expressed his regrets that he could not arrive in time to save Diamond Rock. However, Nelson expressed his admiration for Maurice's conduct and informed Maurice that at his, Nelson's, particular request, Maurice and Savage were to serve under Nelson's command. At the time, Nelson was preparing to resume command of the Mediterranean fleet. Unfortunately, Maurice was not able to get Savage ready in time and so was not able to be present at the Battle of Trafalgar.

Having missed the battle, Savage spent from December 1805 to June 1807 primarily in convoying vessels from various ports in the St George's Channel to The Downs, and back. During this service, Savage never lost a vessel.

Savage sailed with a convoy from Cork to Jamaica on 30 August 1807. There, he served at the Jamaica station under Vice-Admiral Dacres. On 12 December, Savage captured the Spanish privateer Quixote off Porto Cavallo. Quixote carried eight guns and a crew of 99 men. She was "a Vessel of a large Class, and fitted out for the Annoyance of the Trade bound to [Jamaica]".

In July 1808, Maurice joined Admiral Alexander Cochrane at Barbados. Cochrane appointed Maurice governor of Marie-Galante, a post he took up on 1 October.

Commander William Robilliard then replaced Maurice. In 1810, Commander William Ferrie replaced Robilliard. He sailed for Jamaica on 2 July 1810.

Savage underwent repairs at Sheerness between September 1811 and March 1812. Commander William Bissel recommissioned her in February. He then sailed with a convoy to Quebec on 18 May 1812.

On 20 January 1814, Bissel stranded Savage on Guernsey. After three days of thick weather, she grounded on Rock North on the northernmost end of the island. Some pilots came aboard and eventually, with their assistance, Savage reached Great Harbour, where she again grounded. The next day, she was brought to the Pier Head and then to a port where she could be repaired. The court martial board dismissed Bissel from the Navy because he had sailed southward for too long, neglected to use the lead and keep a reckoning, and failed to insist that his officers do likewise.

By February, Savage was back at Portsmouth. C. Mitchell replaced Bissel.

== Fate ==
The Navy offered Savage for sale at Portsmouth on 3 February 1819. That day, she was sold to Mr. John Tibbut for £950.
