= HMS Imogen (1805) =

Brig-sloop of the Royal Navy

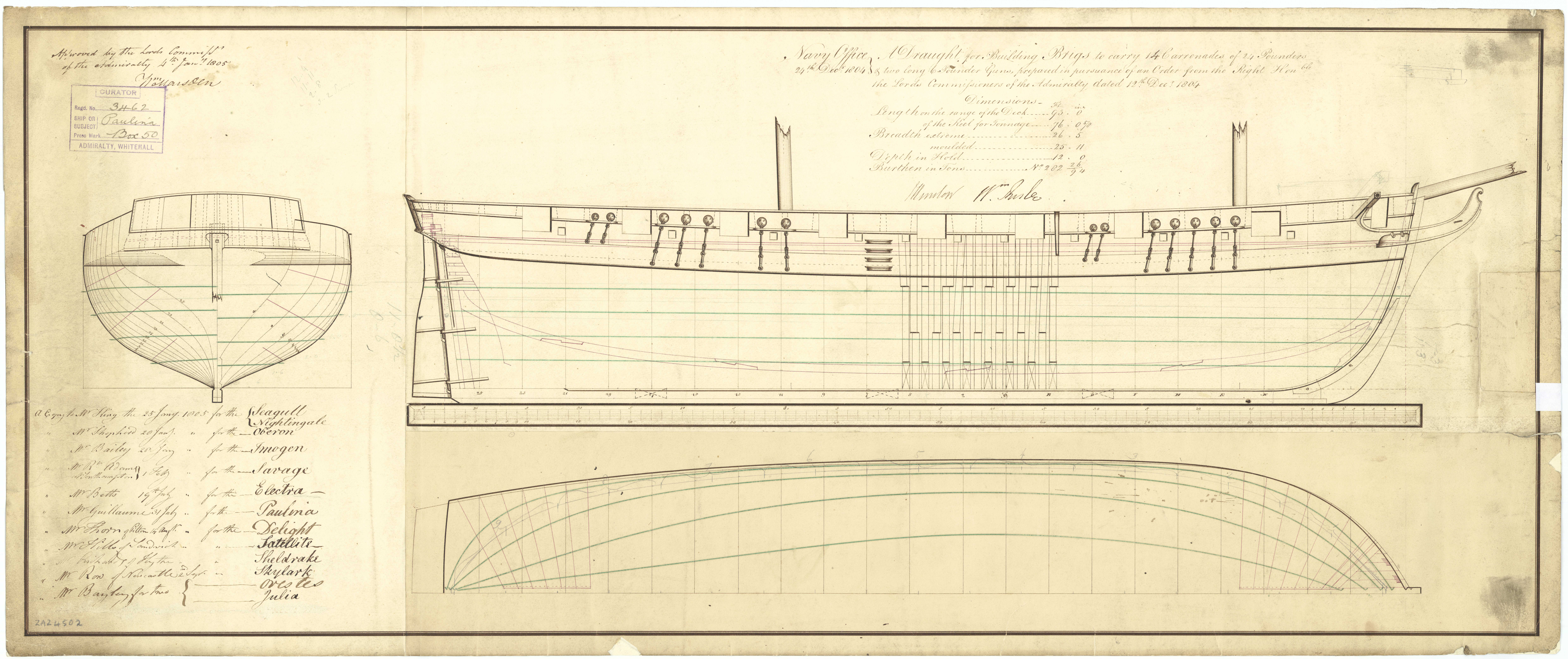
- Imogen

History

United Kingdom
- Name: HMS Imogen
- Ordered: 12 December 1804
- Builder: Jabez Bayley, Ipswich
- Laid down: April 1805
- Launched: 11 July 1805
- Commissioned: August 1805
- Fate: Sold 1817

General characteristics
- Type: 16-gun brig-sloop
- Tons burthen: 2848/94 bm
- Length: Overall; 93 ft 0 in (28.3 m); Keel: 76 ft 0 5/8 in (23.2 m)
- Beam: 26 ft 6 in (8.1 m)
- Depth of hold: 12 ft 0 in (3.7 m)
- Sail plan: Sloop
- Complement: 95
- Armament: 14 × 24-pounder carronades; 2 × 6-pounder bow guns

HMS Imogen (or Imogene) was a Royal Navy 16-gun brig-sloop of the Seagull class launched in July 1805. She served primarily in the Adriatic campaign before the Navy sold her in 1817.

== History ==
Commander Thomas Garth commissioned Imogen in August 1805 for the North Sea. In November she towed Friendship, of Inverness, Brimmer, master, into Yarmouth. Imogen had found Friendship at sea with no one aboard.

On 18 April 1806, Imogen captured the Prussian galliot Broderlusde, and on 23 August Bergitta.

Garth sailed for the Mediterranean on 26 June 1807. On 13 September, Imogen captured the Danish vessel Commandant van Scholten.

On 27 January 1808, Imogen captured the brig William Tell and her cargo. In March Commander William Stephens replaced Garth.

The British decided to capture the island of Saint Maura, north of Corfu. Stephens and Imogen became part of a squadron that included Magnificent, under the command of Captain George Eyre, who was the naval commander, Belle Poule, three gunboats, and five troop transports. When the squadron arrived on 21 March 1810, Eyre ordered Stephens to take the gunboats and to anchor as close to shore as possible to cover the troop landing and to silence two small shore batteries there. The next day operations began. The batteries fired on Imogen and the gunboats, but were soon silenced. Stephens went ashore and was wounded in the foot while storming the redoubts that protected the citadel. Even so, on 25 March, he sailed with Imogen, Belle Poule, and the gunboats to the north of the island to prevent the enemy from landing reinforcements. The citadel finally capitulated on 15 April. Stephens was the only casualty on Imogen.

Imogen shared in the prize money for the Franco-Italian 10-gun brig Carlotta, captured on 10 December 1810. (Note: A first-class share of the prize money was worth £42 5s 3 3/4d; a sixth-class share, that of an ordinary seaman, was worth 8s 7d.) Imogen shared the prize money with the actual captor, Belle Poule, and two other vessels.

On 30 January 1811, Leonidas, Victorious, Belle Poule, and Imogen destroyed the Italian man-of-war schooner Leoben. Leoben was sailing along the Albanian coast from Venice to Corfu with a cargo of ordnance when the British caught her. She was armed with ten guns and a crew of 60 men. Her crew set her on fire and she subsequently blew up.

In February 1813, Imogen was still in the Mediterranean and under the command of Lieutenant Charles Taylor (acting). Apollo. Imogen, and troops captured Augusta and Carzola Islands. On 1 February Apollo, Imogen, and Gunboat No. 43, under the command of Mr. Antonio Pardo, sailed to Curzola. There Imogen and the gunboat supported an attack by Captain Taylor of Apollo, who commanded a landing party that silenced several sea batteries. When the town capitulated, the British captured a privateer that had "molested the trade of the Adriatic", and two of her prizes. That day the British also captured seven vessels sailing to Ragusa and Cattaro, principally carrying cargoes of grain. (Note: A first-class share of the prize money was worth £38 18s 8d; a sixth-class share was worth 5s 3d.)

Commander William Bamber was appointed to Imogene on 7 October 1813, on the Clyde. In 1815 Lieutenant John Gilmore replaced Bamber.

== Fate ==
Imogen was placed in ordinary in July 1815. The Navy offered her for sale on 3 April 1817, at Plymouth. She was sold there that day for £690 to a Mr. Ismay.
