= HMS Orestes (1805) =

Brig-sloop of the Royal Navy

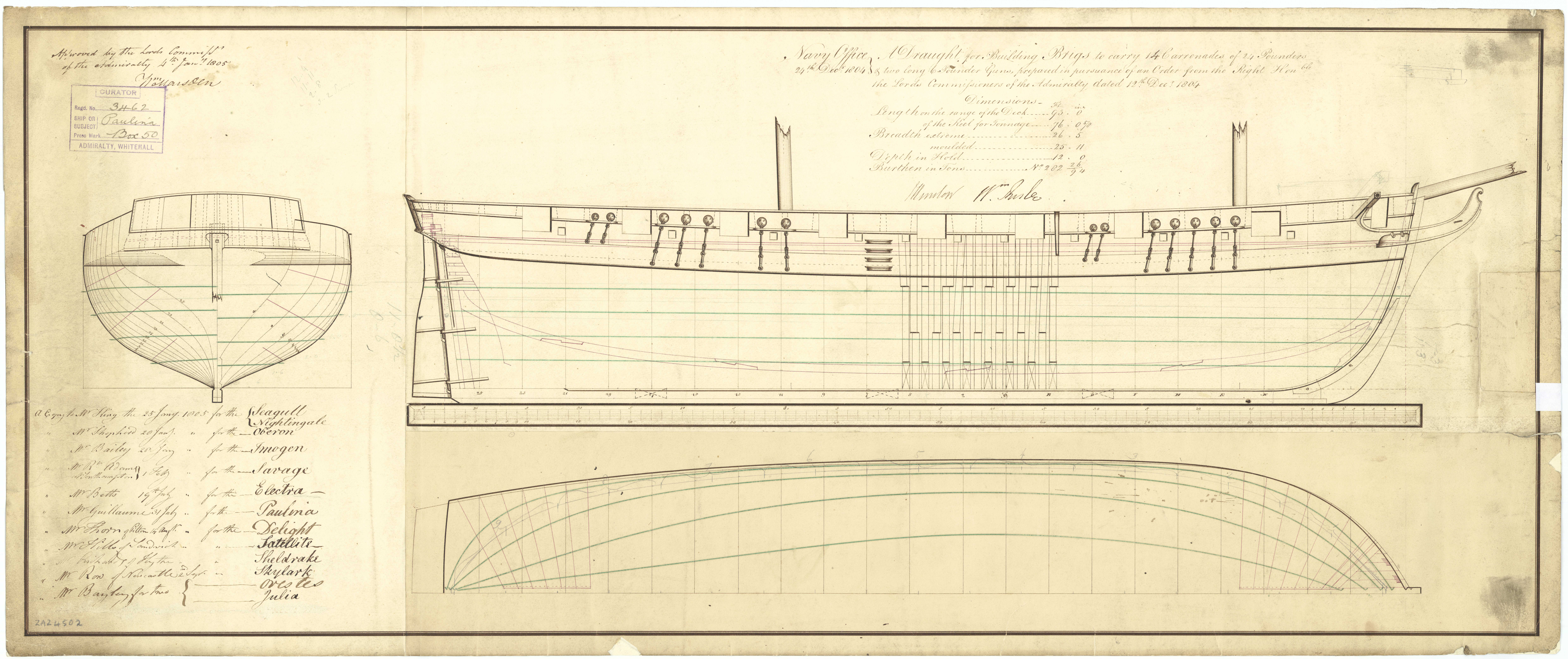
- Orestes

History

United Kingdom
- Name: HMS Orestes
- Ordered: 16 July 1805
- Builder: Jabez Bayley, Ipswich
- Laid down: August 1805
- Launched: 23 October 1805
- Fate: Sold for breaking up 1817

General characteristics
- Type: 16-gun brig-sloop
- Tons burthen: 2848/94 bm
- Length: 93 ft 0 in (28.3 m) (overall); 76 ft 0 5/8 in (23.2 m) (keel)
- Beam: 26 ft 6 in (8.1 m)
- Depth of hold: 12 ft 0 in (3.7 m)
- Sail plan: Sloop
- Complement: 95
- Armament: 14 × 24-pounder carronades; 2 × 6-pounder bow guns

HMS Orestes was a 16-gun brig-sloop of the Seagull class of the British Royal Navy, launched in October 1805. She served during the Napoleonic Wars, primarily in the North Sea and the Channel, where she captured three privateers. The Navy sold her in 1817.

== Career ==
Commander George Poulet commissioned Orestes in January 1806. In October Commander John Richards Lapenotiere replaced Poulet. On 2 October Orestes was among the three British warships that were in company when they captured Elonara Wilhelmina, Zimmerman, master. Four days later, Lapenoitiere and Orestes captured two Dutch fishing vessels, Jonge Classina and Hoop Van Winsl.

On 19 January 1807, Orestes recaptured Ant. Three months later, on 16 April, Orestes captured Sophia. Then on 26 May, Orestes was in company with the third rate Resolution and the hired armed cutter Lord Keith when they captured Hoppet and Neptunus.

During the summer, Orestes was in the North Sea as part of the fleet under Admiral Gambier that engaged in the second Battle of Copenhagen. (Note: The prize money for an able seaman was £3 8s 0d.) After the evacuation of Zeeland, Orestes remained as part of the squadron protecting merchant shipping in the Sound. On 16 November Orestes was off Elsinore, engaging in an exchange of fire with some shore batteries while attempting to recapture a British vessel the Danes had captured. Unfortunately, sparks from the guns ignited a small magazine of gunpowder, which exploded. The explosion burnt off all the skin on Lapenoitiere's face, ears and neck, and all his hair, and caused some other injuries as well.

After her service in the North Sea, Orestes served on the Plymouth station until 1810. On 18 June 1808, Orestes captured the Spanish lugger Concepcione. Concepcion was a 12-gun letter of marque. Orestes also recaptured an American ship sailing to Plymouth with timber.

Plover, under the command of Commander Phillip Browne, was off the Scilly Isles on 6 November, when she sighted a brig chasing a lugger. Plover joined in, with Orestes joining later. After a chase of almost four hours, Plover came alongside the lugger, which surrendered. The lugger proved to be the French privateer Lezard, of Saint Malo. She was pierced for 14 guns, but had none aboard when captured. She and her crew of 57 men had sailed from Île de Batz the night before but had not made any capture. Browne credited Lord Viscount Neville of the brig Acteon and "Captain Davies", of Orestes, with having blocked Lezard's escape. (Note: This may be an error, or more probably Davies may have been in temporary command while Lapenotiere was on leave.) (Note: Lezard was a lugger commissioned at Saint-Malo as a privateer in December 1807 under Joseph Lesnard, with 54 men and 14 guns. She made her first cruise from December 1807 to April 1808; her second under Fançois Godefroy-La Truite (or La Truille) lasted from November 1808 to some time in 1809, with 56 men and 14 guns. She made her third cruise under Captain Le Landais with 70 men and 14 carronades from October 1809 until her capture by HMS Plover on 6 November.) Lastly, Browne further reported that the three British men-of-war had recaptured the English ship Weymouth, from Gibraltar, shortly before she could reach Aber Wrac'h.

On 1 April 1809 Orestes was at Hamoaze for the court-martial of one of her men on charges of having sodomized a goat in the goat house aboard the vessel. Lapenotiere brought the charges.

Orestes recaptured the ship Pilgrim on 20 February 1810.

A little over two months later, on 9 May, Orestes was eight leagues (39 km) southwest by east of The Lizard when she was finally able to capture the French privateer schooner Dorade after a seven-hour chase. Dorade carried ten guns and a crew of 43 men under the command of Emmanuel Ives Le Roux. Favorite joined the chase and it was fire from Favorite that brought down the privateer's main and foretop masts, enabling Orestes to effect the capture. Dorade was a new vessel on her first cruise; she had left the Île de Batz only the previous evening and had made no captures. (Note: Dorade was a privateer from Saint-Malo commissioned in March 1810. Her first cruise was under Emmanuel-Yves Leroux-Desrochettes with 40 to 43 men, four guns and six swivel guns. Captured soon after her departure on this cruise.)

Then on 6 July, Orestes was in company with Curacoa, Amelia, and Muros at the recapture of the Swedish ship Bergmasteren. (Note: A first-class share of the salvage money was worth £21 6s 2½d; a sixth-class share, that of an ordinary seaman, was worth 6s 8¼d.)

On 30 October Orestes captured a second privateer. This was Loup Garou, of 16 guns and 100 men under the command of Charles Laurent Faures. At daylight, at 48°30′N 81°56′W, Orestes encountered a brig whose response suggested to Lapenotiere that the brig was a French privateer. He gave chase and within an hour was able to bring her to action as a shot from Orestes had carried away the privateer's main haulyards. The privateer returned fire for about half an hour, but without causing any British casualties. The privateer belonged to Nantz but was two days out of Brest. Lapenotiere described her as a "remarkably fine Vessel, One Year Old, coppered and copper fastened, well found in every Thing, is victualled for Two Months, and, I think, fit for His Majesty's Service." (Note: Loup-Garou was a brig from Dunkirk commissioned in January 1810. She made her first cruise under Joseph Castellan, from Marseille, with 100 men and 16 guns. She was probably recommissioned in October 1810 at Dieppe. Orestes captured Loup Garou on 27 October (French records) at 48°5′N 8°9′W. The engagement lasted about 30 minutes and cost Loup Garou four men wounded.)

On 9 May 1811, Orestes brought into Plymouth a brig that was coming from Batavia with a rich cargo of spices. The Post Office Packet Service packet Townshend had captured the brig and taken control of her for seven days until Orestes arrived and took the brig in charge. Townshend had been on her way to the Mediterranean when she captured the brig, of six guns and 30 men, and sent her into Falmouth. Orestes had boarded the brig off the Isle of Scilly. The brig had also been carrying dispatches, which she had sunk.

In August Commander John Carter replaced Lapenotiere. Commander William Richard Smith replaced Carter two months later.

On 13 February 1812 Orestes was in company with Persian, when Persian recaptured Arcadia. Orestes next captured the American schooner Henry and Clement on 13 May 1813.

In January 1814 Orestes recaptured two vessels, Harvest on the 21st and Ann on the 28th. A French privateer lugger of 14 guns and 130 men had captured Ann of the Eddystone but Orestes was able to recapture her within four hours.

== Post-war and fate ==
The navy first offered Orestes for sale at Chatham on 15 February 1816, but it took over a year to sell her. The navy sold Orestes on 6 March 1817 at Chatham to a Mr. Thomas Pittman for £710.
