= Union (1805 ship) =

UK slave and merchant ship (1805–mid-1820s)

History

United Kingdom
- Name: Union
- Launched: 1805, Liverpool
- Fate: Last listed in the mid-1820s

General characteristics
- Tons burthen: 216 (bm)
- Complement: 1808: 30; 1809:
- Armament: 1808: 2 × 9-pounder guns + 16 × 9-pounder carronades; 1809: 14 × 9-pounder cannons; 1810: 10 × 9-pounder carronades

Union was launched at Liverpool in 1805. She made three voyages as a slave ship in the triangular trade in enslaved people. She transported at least 743 captives to the West Indies and South Carolina. After the end of British participation in the trans-Atlantic slave trade she then became a West Indiaman. Union was last listed in the mid-1820s.

== Career ==
Union first appeared in Lloyd's Register (LR) in 1805.

Year	Master	Owner	Trade	Source
1805	J.Tucker	Thompson	Liverpool–Africa	LR

1st enslaving voyage (1805–1806): Captain Joseph Tucker sailed from Liverpool on 18 March 1805. Union acquired captives in the Congo River region and arrived with 243 captives at Suriname on 7 October 1805. She sailed from Suriname on 27 February 1806, and arrived back at Liverpool on 14 April. She had left Liverpool with 41 crew members and had suffered five crew deaths on her voyage.

2nd enslaving voyage (1806–1807): Captain Tucker sailed from Liverpool on 9 June 1806. Union gathered captives in the Congo River region and arrived with 312 captives on 28 November 1806 at Charleston.

In December 1803, the South Carolina General Assembly voted to reopen the African slave trade. Concern with the spread of yellow fever had caused the Assembly to suspend the slave trade. The Medical Society of South Carolina relaxed quarantine measures, prioritizing reopening the slave trade over public health. The Medical Society argued that the fever was not imported (correct), and not contagious. Later it was discovered that the disease was not directly contagious, but was mosquito-borne, and so indirectly contagious, and that quarantine would help reduce the spread.

Union left Charleston on 26 January 1807 and arrived back at Liverpool on 19 March. She had left Liverpool with 36 crew members and had suffered two crew deaths on her voyage.

The act for the abolition of the slave trade had passed Parliament and had received Royal Assent in March 1807. It took effect on 1 May 1807. However, vessels that had before 1 May received clearance to sail were still permitted to still sail.

3rd enslaving voyage (1807–1808): Captain Tucker sailed from Liverpool on 25 May 1807. Union acquired captives at Cape Coast Castle and Accra, and arrived on 16 February 1808 at Kingston with 228 captives. She sailed from Kingston on 7 July, and arrived back at Liverpool on 16 August. She had left Liverpool with 38 crew members and had suffered seven crew deaths on her voyage.

Union then became a West Indiaman.

Year	Master	Owner	Trade	Source
1808	J.Tucker; J.Phillips	Thompson; H.Mulban	Liverpool–Africa; Liverpool–Hayti	LR

Captain James Phillips acquired a letter of marque on 10 October 1808.

Year	Master	Owner	Trade	Source
1809	J.Phillips; J.Brown	H.Mulban	Liverpool–Hayti	LR

Captain John Brown acquired a letter of marque on 19 October 1809.

Year	Master	Owner	Trade	Source & notes
1810	J.Brown	J.Leigh	Liverpool–Barbados	LR
1811	J.Brown; Smith	J.Leigh	Liverpool–Barbados; London–Suriname	LR
1813	Smith; W.Kendall	Faith & Co.	London–Suriname; London–Grenada	LR
1818	J.Fullarton	Faith & Co.	Cork–Dublin	LR
1819	W.Stewart	Sands & Co.	Cork–Limerick	LR; damages repaired 1818
1822	W.Steward	Sands & Co.	Cork–Limerick	LR; damages repaired 1818

Lloyd's Register carried Union with unchanged data until 1826. The Register of Shipping (RS) had discrepant data.

Year	Master	Owner	Trade	Source & notes
1818	Fulvister	G. Faith	Plymouth–San Domingo	RS
1819	Steward	G.Faith	Liverpool–Quebec	RS

This data continued unchanged until the Register of Shipping last listed Union in 1824.
