= French corvette Iris =

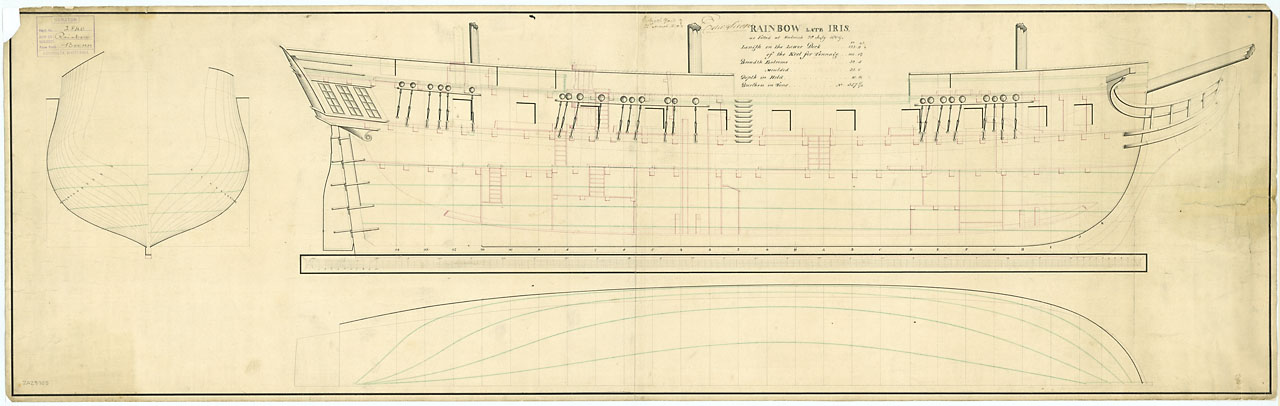
- Rainbow drawn in 1809

History

France
- Name: Iris
- Ordered: 19 February 1803
- Builder: Dunkirk, plans by Brelocq, revised by Sané
- Laid down: 19 February 1805
- Launched: 11 October 1806
- Commissioned: 1 October 1808
- Captured: 3 January 1809

United Kingdom
- Name: HMS Rainbow
- Acquired: February 1809 by capture
- Fate: Sold 1815

General characteristics
- Class & type: Iris-class corvette
- Displacement: 756 tons (French)
- Tons burthen: 58717/94 (bm)
- Length: 123 ft 9 in (37.7 m) (gundeck); 105 ft 10 5/8 in (32.3 m) (keel)
- Beam: 32 ft 5 in (9.9 m)
- Depth of hold: 10 ft 1 1/2 in (3.1 m)
- Complement: French service: 140 British service: 173
- Armament: Originally: 20 × 8-pounder guns; 1808: 18 × 24-pounder carronades + 2 × 12-pounder long guns; British service: Upper deck: 20 × 32-pounder carronade; QD: 6 × 18-pounder carronades; Fc: 2 × 6-pounder chase guns

Iris was a 20-gun corvette of the French Navy. The Royal Navy captured her in 1809 and took her into service as HMS Rainbow. She was sold in 1815.

== French service and capture ==
Iris was built to plan by Louis Bretocq, a plan that Jacques-Noël Sané altered. However, Bretocq probably acted as cosntructeur. Construction did not begin until some two years after the order, and Iris was then on the stocks for some three years.

The French Navy commissioned Iris on 31 December 1808, under capitaine de fregate Charles Méquet (or Joseph-Jean Macquet, or Miquet). She left Dunkirk 29 January 1809 with 640 casks of flour for Martinique. En route, on 2 February at 11am she encountered HMS Aimable, under Captain Lord George Stuart, while off the Texel on the Wellbank. A 28-hour chase ensued, followed by a short running fight 38 leagues off Aberdeen. In the action Iris lost two men killed and eight wounded, and Aimable lost one man killed and one wounded. Iris then struck. Iris was brought into Yarmouth roads in early February. Lloyd's List reported that she had been captured on 4 February, and that at the time of the encounter she had been in company with a brig.

== Royal Navy service ==
Iris arrived at Woolwich on 14 March 1809. There the Royal Navy took her into service as HMS Rainbow and proceeded to fit her out until 23 August. The British upgraded her armament, turning her into a 28-gun sixth rate. Commander James Woolridge commissioned her in August. He then sailed her for Jamaica on 24 November.

On 13 March 1810, Rainbow encountered the French frigate Néréide, under the command of Jean-François Lemaresquier, off Point Abaco. Though Néréide was almost twice the size of Rainbow, Lemaresquier was uninterested in getting into an engagement. Next morning though, Avon, under Commander Henry Fraser, joined the chase. Lemaresqueir continued to flee to separate the two British ships, but stopped to engage Rainbow after Avon had fallen back. He soon had reduced Rainbow to a battered state, but Avon resolutely came in support and put a 30-minute fight against the much stronger Néréide before herself retreating. Rainbow suffered ten men wounded; Avon had one man killed, one mortally wounded, and seven wounded. The French account is that damage on Néréide prevented her from giving chase. Lemaresquier therefore continued on his course, reaching Brest on 30 March. The British account is that Néréide declined to continue the action, despite the damaged state of the two British ships, and instead sailed on. The two British ships then made for Jamaica as best they could, arriving on the 16th.

Rainbow returned to Britain, before sailing for the Mediterranean on 12 May 1811. Captain Gardiner Henry Guion assumed command on 26 September 1811. He sailed Rainbow in support of the Catalan patriots, against the French. In 1812 Captain Andrew King took command.

Captain Gawen Hamilton took command in 1813. On 8 April 1813 he was already in command when Rainbow captured the French brig Paix. On 1 July Rainbow, in company with the lugger Thistle, recaptured Perseverance. (Note: It is not entirely clear what vessel Thistle was as no ship of her description is listed as a commissioned warship or hired armed vessel. The prize money report gives her commander as Lieutenant James Anderson and she may have been a tender to a warship. The most likely candidate is the lugger Thistle, of 10 guns and 50 men, that was a tender to Caledonia, then serving in the Mediterranean as Sir Edward Pellew's flagship. A first-class share of the prize money was worth £579 17s 8½d, or some two-years salary for Hamilton. A sixth-class share, that of an ordinary seaman, was worth £7 3s 11½d.)

Rainbow and Pylades were in company on 18 June searching for a "remarkably fast-sailing brigantine", of one gun and 40 men. During the night they found her and were able to come up on either side of her. They then forced her on shore under Cape Cavallo, Sardinia (40°48′N 9°50′E; probably Capo Coda Cavallo).

On 11 September, Rainbow's boats captured two latines off the Bay of Ajaccio. One had on board a lieutenant and several men of the 2d Battalion of French pioneers. The other was carrying a cargo of wheat.

Next, on 13 December, Hamilton went onshore to assist the Italian levies in their unsuccessful attack on Leghorn. He joined a force of marines from a squadron of eight British warships, including Rainbow. During this operation Hamilton was lightly wounded.

In April 1814 Rainbow supported the British Army in its successful attack on Genoa, losing one man severely wounded. Before the fall of Genoa, the boats of Berwick and Rainbow, together with two Sicilian gunboats, attacked French posts near the pass of Rona on 8 and 10 April to assist the British Army in its advance. The British drove off the French defenders, who left behind two 24-pounder guns and two mortars. The British lost two men killed and five wounded. Prize money for Genoa was paid in 1818. (Note: The Admiral's share was worth £887 19s 0½d. A first-class share was worth £169 2s 8d; a sixth-class share was worth £1 2s 8¼d. Another payment for the vessels in Admiral Pellew's squadron on 19 April was paid two years later. A first-class share was worth £69 6s 1d; a sixth-class share was worth 9s 4d.) Next, Rainbow was part of the naval force in the British capture of Savona on 24 April. (Note: A first-class share was worth £71 10s 8½d; a sixth-class share was worth 9s 5½d.)

Captain Edward Silby replaced Hamilton in 1814, only to be replaced by Captain James Black, who in turn was replaced by James Wemyss in July.

== Fate ==
Rainbow was paid off in December 1814. The Navy offered her for sale at Deptford on 23 March 1815. It sold her on 25 March for £860.
