= HMS Rooke =

One ship and two shore establishments of the Royal Navy have borne the name HMS Rooke after Admiral Sir George Rooke:

Ship

- HMS Rooke was a Thornycroft-type flotilla leader launched in 1920. She was renamed HMS Broke in 1921, and served until foundering under tow in 1942 after being damaged during Operation Terminal.

Shore establishments

- HMS Rooke (1940 shore establishment) was the boom defence central depot at Rosyth. It was commissioned in 1940 and paid off in 1946, being renamed HMS Safeguard.
- HMS Rooke (1946 shore establishment) was the naval base at Gibraltar. It was commissioned in 1946, succeeding HMS Cormorant, and operating until becoming a Joint Service Base in 1990. This was paid off in 1996.

== See also ==
- HMS Rook (1806), which was a Royal Navy Cuckoo-class schooner captured by two French privateers in 1808.
