= John O'Gaunt (1809 ship) =

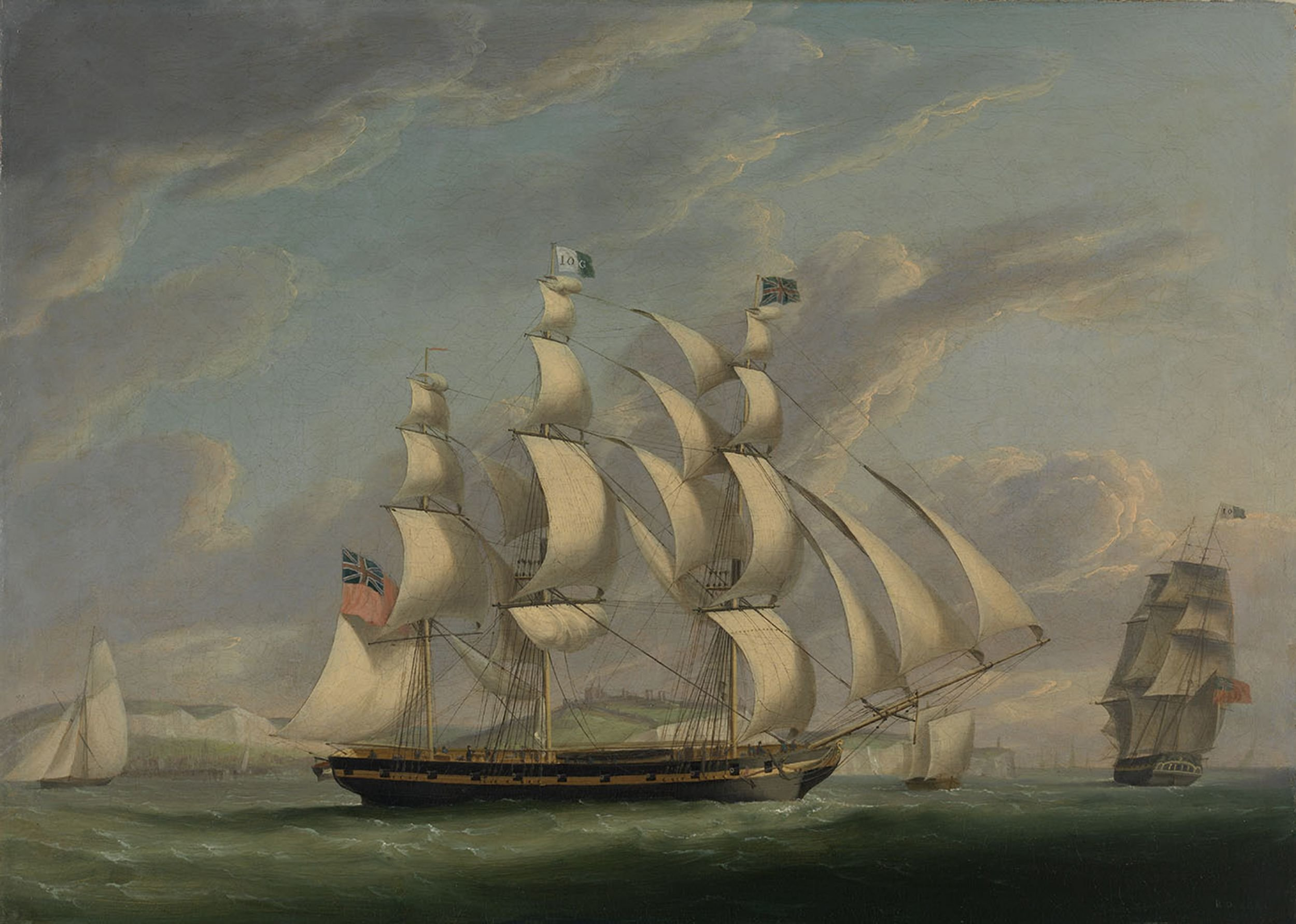
- "Off Dover, The Merchantman John O'Gaunt in Two Positions", by Robert Dodd, 1811

History

United Kingdom
- Name: John O'Gaunt
- Namesake: John O'Gaunt
- Owner: Worswick & Co.
- Builder: John Brockbank, Lancaster, Lancashire
- Launched: 1809
- Fate: Scuttled December 1813

General characteristics
- Tons burthen: 419, or 426, (bm)
- Complement: 1809:18; 1810:20
- Armament: 1809:16 × 12-pounder guns; 1810:12 × 12-pounder guns; 1814:7 × 12-pounder carronades

John O'Gaunt was a merchant ship launched in 1809 that traded with the West Indies. The French frigate Clorinde captured and scuttled John O'Gaunt in 1813.

On 7 July 1809, Captain Robert Gibson received a Letter of marque for John O'Gaunt. Under his command, and later under the command of James Moon, who received a letter of marque on 23 March 1810, she made several voyages as a West Indiaman. On 1 November 1811, as she was sailing from London to Cork and Barbados, she lost an anchor in The Downs.

On 27 November 1813 John O'Gaunt, P. Inglis, master, and four other merchant vessels left Portsmouth in a convoy under escort by HMS Severn. The other four were:

- Blendon Hall, 473 tons (bm), Barr, master, which had been sailing from London to Bermuda;
- Lusitania, 245 tons (bm), Johnston, master, which had been sailing from London to Suriname;
- Aurora, Scheidt, master, which had been sailing to Amelia Island; and,
- Superb, 130 tons (bm), R. Roberts, master, which had been sailing from Gibraltar to England.

Due to a heavy storm, the five merchantmen lost contact with the convoy and its escort. On 6 December Clorinde captured all five merchant vessels, in the Atlantic Ocean (44°30′N 10°30′W). The French took off the crews of four vessels and scuttled three. In their haste, they failed to sink Blenden Hall properly, leaving her floating. They kept Lusitania as a cartel and put all their captives aboard her. They then permitted Lusitania to sail to a British port. She arrived at Plymouth on 18 December.

John O'Gaunt's entry in the Register of Shipping for 1814 carries the notation "CAPTURED".
