= List of shipwrecks in September 1839 =

The list of shipwrecks in September 1839 includes ships sunk, foundered, wrecked, grounded, or otherwise lost during September 1839.

== 1 September ==
List of shipwrecks: September 1839
Ship	State	Description
John	United Kingdom	The schooner was driven ashore at Havre de Grâce, Seine-Inférieure, France. She was on a voyage from Rouen, Seine-Inférieure to Newcastle upon Tyne, Northumberland. John was refloated on 8 September and taken into Havre de Grâce.
Little Western	United Kingdom	Aust Ferry: The ferry foundered in the River Severn with the loss of all eleven people on board.
Maria	United Kingdom	The ship ran aground on the Inner Dowsing Sand, in The Wash and was damaged. She was on a voyage from Hartlepool, County Durham to London. Maria was refloated and put into Hull, Yorkshire.

== 2 September ==
List of shipwrecks: 2 September 1839
Ship	State	Description
Mary Elizabeth	United Kingdom	The ship was driven ashore and wrecked in the Solway Firth. Her crew were rescued. She was on a voyage from Saint John's, Newfoundland, British North America to Belfast, County Antrim.
Pilot	United Kingdom	The ship was driven ashore at Northam, Devon. Hercrew were rescued. She was on a voyage from Limerick to London.
Pioneer	United States	The ship was driven ashore at Bluff Point, Connecticut. She was on a voyage from New York to a port in Virginia.
Success	United Kingdom	The schooner was driven ashore at Landguard Fort, Felixtowe, Suffolk.

== 4 September ==
List of shipwrecks: 4 September 1839
Ship	State	Description
Felis Pencamento	Spain	The schooner was driven ashore and wrecked at Forlorn Point, County Wexford, United Kingdom with the loss of four of her crew. She was on a voyage from St. Ubes to Sligo, United Kingdom.
Friends	United Kingdom	The ship was driven ashore on Skagen, Denmark. She was on a voyage from Saint Petersburg, Russia to Sunderland, County Durham.
Hiati Felix	Portugal	The schooner was wrecked in the Saltee Islands, County Wexford with the loss of three of her crew. She was on a voyage from St. Ubes to Sligo.
John Marshall	United States	The ship was driven ashore on Skagen. She was on a voyage from Saint Petersburg to New York.
Novaya Zemlya (Новая Земля)	Imperial Russian Navy	The schooner struck a sunken rock and sank in ru:Startseva Bay, in the White Sea. Her crew were rescued by a fishing vessel. She was on a voyage from Novaya Zemlya to Arkhangelsk.
Orinoco	United States	The ship was driven ashore on Skagen. She was on a voyage from Gothenburg, Sweden to Boston, Massachusetts.
Theodorick	United Kingdom	The ship struck rocks west of the Isles of Scilly and sank. Her crew were rescued. She was on a voyage from Mogadore, Morocco to London.

== 5 September ==
List of shipwrecks: 5 September 1839
Ship	State	Description
Little Hampton	United Kingdom	The schooner was in collision with the West Indiaman brig Diana (United Kingdom) and sank in the English Channel.

== 6 September ==
List of shipwrecks: January 1840
Ship	State	Description
Calcutta	United Kingdom	The ship ran aground in Mochana's Bay, New South Wales.
Seostris	United Kingdom	The ship was driven ashore at Davie Point, New South Wales.

== 7 September ==
List of shipwrecks: 7 September 1839
Ship	State	Description
Brenton	United Kingdom	The ship was driven ashore at Bannow, County Wexford. She was on a voyage from Halifax, Nova Scotia, British North America to Liverpool, Lancashire.
City of Genoa	United Kingdom	The ship was wrecked on the north coast of São Nicolau, Cape Verde Islands. Her crew were rescued. She was on a voyage from London to Brazil.
Cuba	Netherlands	The ship was driven ashore at Hellevoetsluis, Zeeland. She was on a voyage from Rotterdam, South Holland to Batavia, Netherlands East Indies. Cuba was refloated and put into Hellevoetsluis.
Hope	United States	The schooner was wrecked on Washerwoman's Key. Her crew were rescued. She was on a voyage from Charleston, South Carolina to Key West, Florida Territory.
Nelson	United Kingdom	The ship was abandoned in the Atlantic Ocean. Her crew were rescued by Byron (United Kingdom). Nelson was on a voyage from Bristol, Gloucestershire to Quebec City, Lower Canada, British North America.

== 8 September ==
List of shipwrecks: 8 September 1839
Ship	State	Description
Cruiser	United Kingdom	The schooner was driven ashore near Barry's Beach, Nova Scotia, British North America.
Duke of Montrose	United Kingdom	The ship was driven ashore at Ayr. She was on a voyage from Belfast, County Down to Ayr.
Sophia Smith	United Kingdom	The ship ran aground on the Riding Sand, in the Baltic Sea off the coast of Sweden and was wrecked. She was on a voyage from Saint Petersburg, Russia to Hull, Yorkshire.
Stirlingshire	United Kingdom	The ship was wrecked in the Cape Verde Islands with the loss of ten lives. She was on a voyage from Liverpool, Lancashire to Lima, Peru.
William	United Kingdom	The ship capsized and sank in the River Thames at Erith, Kent. Her crew were rescued. She was on a voyage from London to Ostend, West Flanders, Belgium. She was refloated on 13 September and towed to St Katherine's Docks, London.

== 9 September ==
List of shipwrecks: 9 September 1839
Ship	State	Description
Industry	United Kingdom	The ship was driven ashore at Tralee, County Kerry. She was on a voyage from Quebec City, Lower Canada, British North America to Tralee.
Itenerant	United Kingdom	The ship was beached at Middlesbrough, Yorkshire.
Preston	United Kingdom	The ship was driven ashore at the mouth of the River Clwyd.
Virginia	United Kingdom	The ship was driven ashore in Busika Bay. She was on a voyage from Alexandria, Egypt to Odesa. Virginia was refloated with assistance from HMS Royal Charlotte (Royal Navy) and proceeded on her voyage.

== 10 September ==
List of shipwrecks: 10 September
Ship	State	Description
Amity	United Kingdom	The ship was wrecked off Cape Chapeau Rouge, British North America. She was on a voyage from Miramichi, New Brunswick to St. John's, Newfoundland.
Fern Sodskende	flag unknown	The ship was driven ashore and wrecked at Caernarfon, United Kingdom. Her crew were rescued. She was on a voyage from Belfast, County Antrim to Hartlepool, County Durham.

== 11 September ==
List of shipwrecks: 11 September 1839
Ship	State	Description
Lafayette	France	The ship was driven ashore east of Dover, Kent, United Kingdom. she was on a voyage from Bremen to St. Ubes, Portugal.
Scott	United Kingdom	The ship was abandoned in the Atlantic Ocean. Her crew were rescued by Blayase (France). Scott was on a voyage from Yarmouth, Nova Scotia, British North America to Barbados.

== 12 September ==
List of shipwrecks: 12 September 1839
Ship	State	Description
Bittern	United Kingdom	The ship was driven ashore and damaged in a hurricane at Hamilton, Bermuda.
Canton Packet	United States	The ship was driven ashore near Hamburg, where she was subsequently wrecked. She was on a voyage from Gothenburg, Sweden to Boston, Massachusetts.
Coromandel	United Kingdom	The prison ship was driven ashore and severely damaged in a hurricane at Ireland Island, Bermuda. She was later refloated, repaired and returned to service.
Dove	United Kingdom	The ship was driven ashore in a hurricane at Salt Kettle, Bermuda.
Edward	(United Kingdom of Great Britain and Ireland) British North America	The ship was driven ashore and damaged in a hurricane at Albouys Point, Bermuda. She was later refloated and taken into Hamilton.
Eliza	(United Kingdom of Great Britain and Ireland) Bermuda	The ship was driven ashore and wrecked in a hurricane at Ireland Island.
Sally Evans	United Kingdom	The ship was driven ashore in a hurricane at Hamilton. She was later refloated.
Sir Colin Campbell	United Kingdom	The ship was driven ashore and wrecked in a hurricane at St. George's, Bermuda.
Two Partners	(United Kingdom of Great Britain and Ireland) British North America	The ship capsized in the Atlantic Ocean. She was abandoned three days later. Her crew were rescued. Two Partners was on a voyage from Saint Andrews, New Brunswick to Barbados.
Weymouth	United Kingdom	The depot ship was damaged in a hurricane at Ireland Island.
William	United Kingdom	The ship was driven ashore and wrecked in a hurricane at Hamilton.

== 13 September ==
List of shipwrecks: 13 September 1839
Ship	State	Description
Arab	United Kingdom	The ship was wrecked in the Atlantic Ocean. Three crew were rescued by Glasgow (United Kingdom) on 18 September, six others having died. Arab was on a voyage from British Honduras to Hull, Yorkshire.
Ariel	United Kingdom	The ship was wrecked at St. Shotts, Newfoundland, British North America with the loss of a crew member. She was on a voyage from Dublin to Quebec City, Lower Canada, British North America.
Arve	United Kingdom	The ship was lost off Cape Race, Newfoundland.
Ceres	United Kingdom	The ship was wrecked in the Bird Islands with the loss of all but two of her crew. She was on a voyage from Métis-sur-Mer, Lower Canada to London.
Emily	United Kingdom	The schooner was driven ashore at Stanhope, New Jersey, British North America with the loss of four of her crew.
Helena	Sweden	The ship was driven ashore on Öland. She was on a voyage from Stockholm to New York, United States. Helena was later refloated. She resumed her voyage on 17 September.
Idea	United Kingdom	The ship was driven ashore at Charles Cove, Lower Canada. She was on a voyage from Cork to Quebec City. Idea was later refloated.
James	United Kingdom	The ship ran aground on the Scroby Sands, Norfolk and sank.
James	United Kingdom	The brig foundered in the Bristol Channel. Her crew took to the longboat; they were rescued two days later by Lively (United Kingdom).
Maria	France	The ship was wrecked on Sable Island, Nova Scotia, British North America. All on board were rescued. She was on a voyage from Havre de Grâce, Seine-Inférieure to New York.
New Era	United Kingdom	The ship foundered in the English Channel off Bolt Head, Devon with the loss of all hands.
Susannah	United Kingdom	The ship was driven ashore at Richibucto, New Brunswick, British North America.

== 14 September ==
List of shipwrecks: 14 September 1839
Ship	State	Description
Hope	(United Kingdom of Great Britain and Ireland) Jersey	The brig was wrecked 7 nautical miles (13 km) from Belle Isle, Newfoundland, British North America with the loss of a crew member.
Kitty	United Kingdom United Kingdom	The ship was wrecked on the Gunfleet Sand, in the North Sea off the coast of Essex. She was on a voyage from Middelburg, Zeeland, Netherlands to London.
Nancy	United Kingdom	The ship was driven ashore at Dublin. Her crew were rescued. sHe was on a voyage from Whitehaven, Cumberland to Dublin.
Ormus	United Kingdom	The ship was wrecked on the Gunfleet Sand. She was on a voyage from Seaham, County Durham to London.
Triad	United Kingdom	The ship was wrecked on Scroby Sands, Norfolk.

== 15 September ==
List of shipwrecks: September 1839
Ship	State	Description
Brontes	United States	The ship was driven ashore near "Wingo", Sweden. she was on a voyage from Saint Petersburg, Russia to New York. She was refloated on 17 September.
Byron	United States	The schooner was driven ashore and wrecked at Embo, Sutherland with the loss of all but one of her six crew. She was on a voyage from South Shields, County Durham, United Kingdom to Inverness, United Kingdom.
Catherine	United Kingdom	The ship struck a sunken rock and put into the Isle of Harris, Outer Hebrides in a waterlogged condition. She was on a voyage from Arkhangelsk, Russian Empire to Gloucester.
Catherine Mitchell	United Kingdom	The ship was wrecked near the Butt of Lewis, Isle of Lewis.
Expedition	United Kingdom	The ship ran aground on Scroby Sands, Norfolk. She capsized and sank. Her crew were rescued. Expedition was on a voyage from South Shields, county Durham to London.
Harbinger	United Kingdom	The ship ran aground and was severely damaged at Lowestoft, Suffolk. She was later refloated and taken into Lowestoft in a sinking condition.
Hope	United Kingdom	The ship was in collision with Fortuna (United Kingdom) and was beached in the Sound of Scalpey with the loss of a crew member.
James	United Kingdom	The ship was driven ashore and sank at Wicklow. She was on a voyage from Liverpool, Lancashire to Dublin. James was refloated the next day.
Splendid	United Kingdom	The ship was driven ashore on "Nerva Island". She was on a voyage from Saint Petersburg to King's Lynn, Norfolk.
St. Patrick	(United Kingdom of Great Britain and Ireland) British North America	The ship was wrecked on St. Peter's Island, Newfoundland. Her crew were rescued. he was on a voyage from Saint John's, Newfoundland to "Buclush".
Stranger	United Kingdom	The ship was driven ashore and wrecked on Spurn Point, Yorkshire. Her crew were rescued. She was on a voyage from South Shields to Southampton, Hampshire.
Zwee Gebroders	Hamburg	The ship foundered in the North Sea. She was on a voyage from Hamburg to Rouen, Seine-Inférieure, France.

== 16 September ==
List of shipwrecks: 16 September 1839
Ship	State	Description
Fortuna	(Russian Empire) Grand Duchy of Finland	The galease was wrecked in the "Bay of Sem", Bornholm. She was on a voyage from home port Turku to Flensburg, Duchy of Holstein.
George	United States	The whaler was wrecked on Île Amsterdam. Her crew were rescued.
Junge Tjerk Giesen	Netherlands	The ship was driven ashore on Bornholm, Denmark. Her crew were rescued. She was on a voyage from Memel, Prussia to Amsterdam, North Holland.
Mercer	Prussia	The ship was wrecked on Bornholm. Her crew were rescued. She was on a voyage from Memel to Porto, Portugal.

== 17 September ==
List of shipwrecks: 17 September 1839
Ship	State	Description
Alexander	United Kingdom	The sloop was wrecked at Colliston, Forfarshire. Her crew were rescued. She was on a voyage from Kirkwall, Orkney Islands to Newcastle upon Tyne, Northumberland.
St. Patrick	United States	The ship was driven ashore at Beauport, Lower Canada, British North America. She was on a voyage from New York to Quebec City, Lower Canada. St. Patrick was later refloated and completed her voyage.

== 18 September ==
List of shipwrecks: 18 September 1839
Ship	State	Description
Ann	United Kingdom	The ship was wrecked on the Nore. She was on a voyage from Liverpool, Lancashire to London.
Ocean	United Kingdom	The ship was wrecked in the Magdalen Islands, Lower Canada, British North America. She was on a voyage from London to Quebec City, Lower Canada.

== 21 September ==
List of shipwrecks: 21 September 1839
Ship	State	Description
Alfred	United Kingdom	The schooner struck rocks and sank at Newbury Port, Massachusetts, United States. She was on a voyage from Liverpool, Lancashire to Newbury Port.
Brother's Friend	United Kingdom	The ship was driven ashore and severely damaged at Southwold, Suffolk. She was on a voyage from Liverpool to Southwold. Brother's Friend was refloated on 28 September and taken into Southwold.
Columbia	United States	The ship ran aground at New York. She was on a voyage from New Orleans, Louisiana to Havre de Grâce, Seine-Inférieure, France. Columbia was refloated and taken into New York.
Elizabeth	United Kingdom	The barque was wrecked 3 nautical miles (5.6 km) from Fremantle, Swan River Colony. Her crew were rescued.
Jane Vilet	United Kingdom	The ship was driven ashore on Gotland, Sweden. She was on a voyage from "Wyborg" to Hull, Yorkshire.

== 22 September ==
List of shipwrecks: 22 September 1839
Ship	State	Description
Caledonia	United Kingdom	The ship was driven ashore at Perth, Swan River Colony. She was later refloated.
Elizabeth	(United Kingdom of Great Britain and Ireland) Swan River Colony	The ship was driven ashore and wrecked north of Fremantle. She was on a voyage from the Swan River to New South Wales.
Elizabeth	United Kingdom	The sloop caught fire and was scuttled in the River Thames at Woolwich, Kent.
Ellen	(United Kingdom of Great Britain and Ireland) Van Diemen's Land	The schooner was driven ashore and wrecked in Adventure Bay. Her crew survived.
Shepherd	United Kingdom	The ship was driven ashore at Perth, Swan River Colony. She was later refloated.

== 23 September ==
List of shipwrecks: 23 September 1839
Ship	State	Description
Diana	Flag unknown	The ship was driven ashore on Jasmund, Prussia. She was on a voyage from Danzig to Brussels, Belgium.
Speculation	United Kingdom	The ship was wrecked on a reef off Aalborg, Denmark. Her crew were rescued.

== 24 September ==
List of shipwrecks: 24 September 1839
Ship	State	Description
Charles Edouard	France	The ship sank at Dunkirk, Nord. She was on a voyage from Newcastle upon Tyne, Northumberland, United Kingdom to Les Sables d'Olonne, Vendée.
Emerald	United Kingdom	The ship sprang a leak and was beached in Mulroy Bay. She was on a voyage from the Orkney Islands to Lough Swilly.
Friendship	United Kingdom	The ship ran aground on the North Bull. She was on a voyage from Drogheda, County Louth to Aberystwyth, Cardiganshire. Friendship was refloated on 1 October and resumed her voyage.
Marina	United Kingdom	The ship was driven ashore on "Sandorn Island". She was on a voyage from Memel, Prussia to Newport, Monmouthshire. Marina was later refloated and put into Arendal, Norway for repairs.
Pictou	United Kingdom	The ship struck The Manacles and was abandoned. Her crew were rescued. She was on a voyage from Hamburg to Newfoundland, British North America. Pictou was taken into Falmouth, Cornwall the next day.
Splendid	United Kingdom	The ship was driven ashore at Narva, Russia. She was on a voyage from Saint Petersburg, Russia to King's Lynn, Norfolk.

== 25 September ==
List of shipwrecks: 25 September 1839
Ship	State	Description
Good Intent	United Kingdom	The sloop was driven ashore in Currup Bay, Ayrshire. Her crew were rescued.
Industry	United Kingdom	The ship sank off the Scalp. She was on a voyage from South Shields, County Durham to Arbroath, Forfarshire. Industry was refloated on 9 October and taken into South Shields.
Lavinia	United Kingdom	The sloop was abandoned off Cape Wrath, Caithness. Her crew were rescued by Nordon (United Kingdom). Lavinia was on a voyage from Thurso, Caithness to Glasgow, Renfrewshire.
Sarah	United Kingdom	The ship was driven onto the Barnard Sand, in the North Sea off the coast of Norfolk and was damaged. She was later refloated.

== 27 September ==
List of shipwrecks: 27 September 1839
Ship	State	Description
Albion	United Kingdom	The schooner was wrecked in Whitesand Bay with the loss of four of her crew. She was on a voyage from Porthcawl, Glamorgan to Falmouth, Cornwall.
Betock	United Kingdom	The ship was driven ashore and wrecked in the Copeland Islands, County Donegal. She was on a voyage from Troon, Ayrshire to Dublin.
Caroline	United Kingdom	The ship was driven ashore at Saint John, New Brunswick, British North America. She was on a voyage from Saint John's to Londonderry.
Cornwall	United Kingdom	The ship foundered in the Bristol Channel 5 leagues (15 nautical miles (28 km)) south west of the Mumbles Lighthouse, Glamorgan. Her crew were rescued. She was on a voyage from Antwerp, Belgium to Bideford, Devon.
Nancy	(United Kingdom of Great Britain and Ireland) British North America	The ship was lost in St. George's Bay.

== 28 September ==
List of shipwrecks: 28 September 1839
Ship	State	Description
Elizabeth	United Kingdom	The barque was wrecked in the Swan River. All on board were rescued. She was on a voyage from Singapore to the Swan River Colony
Lady Anne	United Kingdom	The ship was driven ashore at Maryport, Cumberland. She was refloated on 8 October.
Lancier	(France) Mauritius	The barque was wrecked between The Stragglers and the Mew Stone. All on board were rescued. She was on a voyage from Mauritius to Perth, Swan River Colony and Van Diemen's Land.
Lavinia	United Kingdom	The ship was abandoned off Cape Wrath, Caithness. She was on a voyage from Castlehill to Glasgow, Renfrewshire.
Margaret Simpson	United Kingdom	The ship foundered in the North Sea 3 nautical miles (5.6 km) east south east of North Sunderland, County Durham.
Thule	United Kingdom	The brigantine was driven ashore at Port aux Basques, Newfoundland, British North America with the loss of all hands. She was on a voyage from Quebec City, Lower Canada, British North America to Lerwick, Shetland Islands.

== 29 September ==
List of shipwrecks: 29 September 1839
Ship	State	Description
Albion	United Kingdom	The schooner foundered in the English Channel off Rame Head, Cornwall with the loss of all three crew and a rescuer. She was on a voyage from Porthcawl, Glamorgan to Plymouth, Devon.
Mercurio	Belgium	The ship foundered in the Atlantic Ocean 7 leagues (21 nautical miles (39 km)) north of Cabo da Roca, Portugal. She was on a voyage from Lisbon, Portugal to Antwerp.

== Unknown date ==
List of shipwrecks: Unknown date in September 1839
Ship	State	Description
Arrival	United Kingdom	The ship was abandoned off St. Paul's Island, Nova Scotia, British North America before 26 September. Her crew were rescued by Blessing (United Kingdom). Arrival was on a voyage from Quebec City, Lower Canada, British North America to Belfast, County Antrim.
Eclipse	United States	The ship foundered in Lake Ontario with the loss of several lives.
Elizabeth	United Kingdom	The barque was wrecked at Cottesloe, Swan River Colony, during a gale on 21–22 September.
Henry Freeling	(United Kingdom of Great Britain and Ireland) New South Wales	The schooner was wrecked at "Towtuck", New Zealand. Her crew survived.
Irma	United States	The ship departed from Marseille, Bouches-du-Rhône, France in late September. No further trace, presumed foundered with the loss of all hands.
John Bull	United Kingdom	The ship foundered in the Atlantic Ocean off Bude, Cornwall on or before 6 September.
Lambertus	France	The ship capsized off West Kapelle, Belgium. She was on a voyage from Bayonne, Basses-Pyrénées to Antwerp, Belgium. Lambertus was later towed into Vlissingen, Zeeland, Netherlands.
Linsen	United Kingdom	The ship was abandoned in the North Sea 5 leagues (15 nautical miles (28 km)) west north west of Heligoland before 5 September. She was on a voyage from Riga, Russia to Dundee, Forfarshire.
London Packet	United Kingdom	The schooner was driven ashore at Amble, Northumberland in late September. She was refloated on 21 October and towed into Blyth, Northumberland for repairs.
Maria	Sweden	The ship was driven ashore in the Abaco Islands before 8 September. She was on a voyage from New York to Havana, Cuba. Maria was refloated and taken into Hamilton, Bermuda.
Moscow	United Kingdom	The ship was wrecked near Quebec City before 26 September.
New York	United Kingdom	The schooner foundered in Lake Ontario with the loss of all on board.
Nicholas I	Russia	The brig sprang a leak and was abandoned in the North Sea before 18 September. She was on a voyage from Finland to London, United Kingdom. Nicholas I was towed into Great Yarmouth, Norfolk, United Kingdom, where she arrived on 23 September in a waterlogged condition.
Rival	United Kingdom	The ship was abandoned in the Atlantic Ocean. She was on a voyage from Quebec City to Belfast. Rival was subsequently towed into Sydney, Nova Scotia, British North America, by British Queen (United Kingdom). She arrived on 20 September.
Tantivy	(United Kingdom of Great Britain and Ireland) British North America	The ship was driven ashore and severely damaged at New Edinburgh, Nova Scotia.
Vrow Catherine	Netherlands	The ship sprang a leak and was abandoned in the North Sea before 28 September. She was on a voyage from Königsburg, Prussia to Amsterdam, North Holland.
Wasp	(United Kingdom of Great Britain and Ireland) British North America	The ship was wrecked at Cook's Harbour, Nova Scotia. She was on a voyage from Yarmouth, Nova Scotia to the West Indies.
