= HMS Crane (1806) =

Cuckoo-class schooner of four 12-pounder carronades

History

United Kingdom
- Name: HMS Crane
- Ordered: 11 December 1805
- Builder: Custance & Stone, Great Yarmouth
- Laid down: February 1806
- Launched: 26 April 1806
- Fate: Wrecked 26 October 1808

General characteristics
- Class & type: Cuckoo-class schooner
- Tons burthen: 751/94 (bm)
- Length: 56 ft 2 in (17.1 m) (overall); 42 ft 4 1/8 in (12.9 m) (keel)
- Beam: 18 ft 3 in (5.6 m)
- Depth of hold: 8 ft 3 in (2.5 m)
- Sail plan: Schooner
- Complement: 20
- Armament: 4 × 12-pounder carronades

HMS Crane was a Royal Navy Cuckoo-class schooner of four 12-pounder carronades and a crew of 20. She was built by Custance & Stone at Great Yarmouth and launched in 1806. Like many of her class and the related Ballahoo-class schooners, she succumbed to the perils of the sea relatively early in her career.

She was commissioned in 1806 under Lieutenant John Cameron for operations in the North Sea. In May 1808 Crane sent into Plymouth the captured Danish vessel Justitia.

In 1808 Crane was under a Lieutenant Mitchell, and then under Lieutenant Joseph Tindale. (Note: For more on Joseph Tindale see: O'Byrne, William R. (1849). "Tindale, Joseph" . A Naval Biographical Dictionary. London: John Murray.)

At 7:30 pm on 25 October 1808 bad weather drove her from her anchorage at Plymouth. She dropped a second anchor. By 4:00 am on 26 October 1808 she was near shore and got under way to make for the Sound. She returned three hours later to find an anchorage but a squall hit her as she went about. She let go an anchor but struck a rock off Plymouth Hoe. She fired her guns to signal distress, which brought out several boats from Plymouth Dockyard. With some assistance she was refloated, but she went aground again. She sank in deeper water with her starboard gunwales just clearing the surface. Boats picked up all her crew from the water. She was later broken up.
