= HMS Challenger (1813) =

Brig-sloop of the Royal Navy

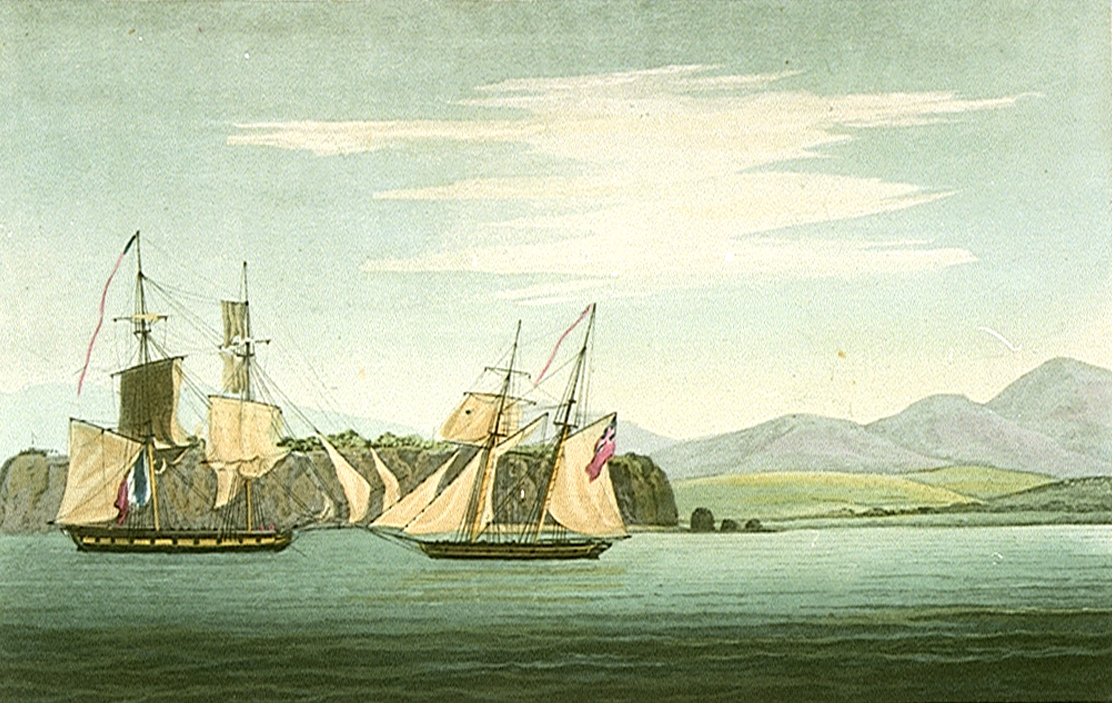
- Challenger (right) engaging Flibustier on 13 October 1813

History

United Kingdom
- Name: HMS Challenger
- Ordered: 29 July 1812
- Builder: Hobbs & Hellyer, Redbridge
- Laid down: August 1812
- Launched: 15 May 1813
- Honours and awards: Naval General Service Medal with clasp "St. Sebastian"
- Fate: Sold May 1824

General characteristics
- Class & type: Cruizer-class brig-sloop
- Tons burthen: 386 89/94 (bm)
- Length: 100 ft 1 3/4 in (30.5 m) (gundeck); 77 ft 4 1/4 in (23.6 m) (keel)
- Beam: 30 ft 8 in (9.3 m)
- Depth of hold: 12 ft 8 1/2 in (3.9 m)
- Sail plan: Brig rigged
- Complement: 121
- Armament: 16 × 32-pounder carronades + 2 × 6-pounder chase guns

HMS Challenger was a Cruizer-class brig-sloop launched at Redbridge, Southampton, in 1813. She participated in the capture of a French privateer and then sailed to the East Indies. She was laid up in 1819 and sold in 1824.

== War service ==
On 25 May 1813, Captain Frederick Edward Venables Vernon was appointed to Challenger and commissioned her.

In July–August, Challenger was part of a squadron of some 17 vessels that participated in the siege of San Sebastián. Because of the shallowness of the water, only the smaller vessels could approach closely enough to bring their guns to bear on the town's defenses. Challenger suffered one casualty in this service: a seaman wounded on the island of Santa Clara. In 1847 the Admiralty awarded the clasp "St. Sebastian" to the Naval General Service Medal to all surviving naval participants at the siege.

On 13 October 1813 HMS Telegraph caused the destruction of the French 16-gun brig Flibustier (1810) in the mouth of the Adour. Flibustier had been in St Jean de Luz sheltering where shore batteries could protect her when she sought to escape because of the approach of Marquis of Wellington's army. She started out during a "dark and stormy night", but Telegraph immediately pursued her. After an action lasting three-quarters of an hour, the French saw Challenger and Constant coming up to join the engagement. Flibustier's crew set her on fire and escaped ashore; she blew up before the British could capture her. She had been under the command of lieutenant de vaisseau Jean-Jacques-Léonore Daniel and armed with sixteen French 24-pounder carronades, two 9-pounder guns, a brass howitzer and four brass 3-pounder guns. There had been 160 men on board and Scriven reported that from what he saw, the French losses must have been considerable; Telegraph had no casualties. Scriven believed that Flibustier was bound for Santona to relieve the garrison there as her cargo consisted of treasure, arms, ammunition, and salt provisions. He also thought that some of the men who had been aboard her were officers and soldiers for the garrison. Both armies witnessed the British victory, with the allied army giving three cheers.

The Marquis of Wellington requested a naval demonstration on 10 November at Socoa in the rear of the French lines of communication. Admiral Keith dispatched four vessels to Saint-Jean-de-Luz: HMS Vesuvius, Challenger, Sparrow, and Racer. However, the swell was so heavy that the naval vessels could do little beyond exchanging fire with the shore batteries there.

On 18 December Challenger brought Blenden Hall into Plymouth. Eliza Packet, from Malta, had found Blenden Hall at sea with no one aboard. At Plymouth Blenden Hall was reunited with her crew, which had arrived that same day on Lusitania. The French frigate Clorinde had put the crews of the five vessels she had captured (including Blenden Hall, which she abandoned), into Lusitania and released them.

On 21 March 1814, Rear-admiral Penrose, in the 74-gun Egmont, anchored in the Gironde with a squadron that included Challenger. On 2 April the boats of Porcupine captured one gun-brig, six gun-boats, one armed schooner, three chasse-marées, and an imperial barge. They burned one gun-brig, two gun-boats, and one chasse-marée. The squadron shared the subsequent prize money. (Note: A first-class share was worth £54 18s 10d; a sixth-class share, that of an ordinary seaman, was worth 13s 7d.) Two days later, the 74-gun Centaur joined Egmont to prepare to attack the French 74-gun Régulus, three brig-corvettes, other vessels lying near her, and the batteries that protected them. Before the British could launch their attack, the French burnt Régulus and the other vessels. (Note: A first-class share of the proceeds and head money was worth £69 6s 4 3/4d; a sixth-class share was worth 14s 5 3/4d.)

On 1 December 1814 Commander Henry Forbes replaced Vernon. Challenger was paid off in September 1815, and then underwent fitting for Channel service in September–October.

== Post-war ==
Forbes sailed Challenger to the East Indies in 1816. Between 8 and 11 April, he served on the court martial of Captain Robert O'Brien of Cornwallis for several acts of indiscipline vis-à-vis Captain George Sayer, his senior officer. The court martial board found O'Brien guilty and ordered him dismissed the service. However, O'Brien protested, with one of the grounds being that all the officers on the court martial board were junior to O'Brien. O'Brien was reinstated in March 1817.

However, Forbes and Challenger had brought with them 600,000 dollars consigned to the government of Bengal, as well as other sums for Calcutta merchants. Because Challenger was at Madras for the court martial, Lieutenant John M'Arthur Low, commander (acting) of Cameleon volunteered to carry the whole to Calcutta, without charging the normal freight service.

On 1 May 1816 Forbes was appointed to Zebra. However, Philip Henry Bridges was acting commander of Zebra from December 1815 – November 1816, when he was promoted into Challenger, replacing Forbes.

Shortly after 18 November 1816 Challenger and the British East India Company's cruisers HCS Ariel, Mercury, and Vestal sailed from Bushire on a punitive expedition against Ras-al-Khaimah. The squadron attacked on 1 December but could not approach the town closely enough for its fire to effect much damage. The squadron did burn some dhows before it withdrew.

On 7 July 1818 the East Indiaman Cabalva wrecked on the rocky uninhabited island of Cargados, Cargados Carajos shoals. A party of 10 survivors sailed her cutter to Mauritius, where HMS Magicienne and Challenger happened to be at Port Louis. They set out immediately, arriving at the wreck site on 20 July. Magicienne remained on site to salvage what she could from the wreck site while Challenger removed the survivors and landed them at Mauritius.

Later that year, Bridges transferred to HMS Trincomalee, together with his crew from Challenger, to help man her. Then, as captain (acting), he sailed her to Portsmouth.

== Fate ==
The Admiralty on 26 February 1818 ordered Challenger sold because of her "very defective state". She was hulked at Trincomallee and in May 1819 fitted to store rice. The next year she became a mooring tender. She was finally sold at Trincomallee for 3,000 rupees in March 1824.

== Post script ==
In January 1819, the London Gazette reported that Parliament had voted a grant to all those who had served under the command of Lord Viscount Keith in 1812, between 1812 and 1814, and in the Gironde. Challenger was listed among the vessels that had served under Keith in 1813 and 1814. (Note: The money was paid in three tranches. For someone participating in the first through third tranches, a first-class share was worth £256 5s 9d; a sixth-class share was worth £4 6s 10d. For someone participating only in the second and third tranches a first-class share was worth £202 6s 8d; a sixth-class share was worth £5 0s 5d.) She had also served under Kieth in the Gironde. (Note: The sum of the two tranches of payment for that service was £272 8s 5d for a first-class share; the amount for a sixth-class share was £3 3s 5d.)
