= HMS Pigeon (1806) =

History

United Kingdom
- Name: HMS Pigeon
- Ordered: 11 December 1805
- Builder: Custance & Stone, Great Yarmouth
- Laid down: February 1806
- Launched: 26 April 1806
- Fate: Wrecked 5 January 1809

General characteristics
- Class & type: Cuckoo-class schooner
- Tons burthen: 751/94 (bm)
- Length: 56 ft 2 in (17.1 m) (overall); 42 ft 4 1/8 in (12.9 m) (keel)
- Beam: 18 ft 3 in (5.6 m)
- Draught: Unladen: 5 ft 1 1/2 in (1.6 m); Laden: 7 ft 6 1/2 in (2.3 m)
- Depth of hold: 8 ft 6 in (2.6 m)
- Sail plan: Schooner
- Complement: 20
- Armament: 4 × 12-pounder carronades

HMS Pigeon (or Pidgeon) was a Royal Navy Cuckoo-class schooner. Custance & Stone built and launched her at Great Yarmouth in 1806. Like many of her class and the related Ballahoo-class schooners, she succumbed to the perils of the sea relatively early in her career.

== Service ==
Pigeon was commissioned in June 1806 under Lieutenant Richard Cox.

Pidgeon was at the surrender of the Danish Fleet after the Battle of Copenhagen on 7 September. (Note: The prize money amounted to £3 8s for an ordinary seaman, or slightly over two months wages.) Pidgeon also shared, with many other ships in the British fleet at Copenhagen in August–September 1807, in the prize money for several other captures: Hans and Jacob (17 August), and Odifiord and Benedicta (4 and 12 September). (Note: The share of the prize money for an ordinary seaman for all three together was 3s 9½d, or less than half-a-week's wages.)

== Fate ==
Pigeon was wrecked off Kingsgate Point near Margate on 5 January 1809. At 5pm while cruising with Calliope off Flushing the two vessels parted company in a heavy gale and snowstorm. Pigeon sighted a light that her crew took to be the North Sand Head but 15 minutes later she grounded. The grounding parted her rudder post; within minutes the water was above her hold and the sea was breaking over her. The crew lashed themselves to the rigging and awaited the dawn. Unfortunately, two of her crew died of exposure during the night. The following morning local people and the Sea Fencibles rescued the survivors.
