= HMS Widgeon (1806) =

History

United Kingdom
- Name: HMS Widgeon
- Ordered: 11 December 1805
- Builder: William Wheaton, Brixham
- Laid down: March 1806
- Launched: 19 June 1806
- Fate: Wrecked 20 April 1808

General characteristics
- Class & type: Cuckoo-class schooner
- Tons burthen: 7535/94 bm
- Length: 56 ft 3 in (17.1 m) (overall); 42 ft 4 1/4 in (12.9 m) (keel)
- Beam: 18 ft 6 in (5.6 m)
- Draught: Unladen: 4 ft 0 in (1.2 m); Laden: 7 ft 9 in (2.4 m)
- Depth of hold: 8 ft 6 in (2.6 m)
- Sail plan: Schooner
- Complement: 20
- Armament: 4 × 12-pounder carronades

HMS Widgeon was a Royal Navy Cuckoo-class schooner built by William Wheaton at Brixham and launched in 1806. Like many of her class and the related Ballahoo-class schooners, she succumbed to the perils of the sea relatively early in her career.

She was commissioned in 1807 under Lieutenant William Morgan for the North Sea. In 1808 she came under the command of Lieutenant George Elliot.

Widgeon was on the Scottish coast helping to assemble a convoy for America when she received orders to proceed to Banff to notify the ships waiting there that the convoy was about to depart. She arrived there on 18 April 1808 and the next day sent a boat into the port. Widgeon then remained four to five miles offshore while waiting for her boat to return.

During a heavy snowstorm on 20 April, at 2:30am she ran into a reef two miles to the northwest of Banff. Her crew threw shot overboard and fired guns of distress. However, there was a heavy swell and she filled with water within 10 minutes. Although she soon was bilged, her crew took to the boats and were saved.

The subsequent court martial on her loss sentenced Widgeon's pilot, Alexander Layell, to six months incarceration in the Marshalsea Prison and to be fined all pay due to him. Elliot had ordered Layell to remain at least four miles from shore throughout the night. Instead, Layell had gone below, leaving a bosun's mate in charge, who had let Widgeon drift towards the shore.
