= French brig Génie (1808) =

History

France
- Name: Génie
- Ordered: 27 October 1806
- Builder: Louis Bretocq, Dunkirk
- Laid down: 1 December 1806
- Launched: 23 July 1808
- Fate: Struck 1833

General characteristics
- Class & type: Sylphe-class brig
- Displacement: 190 ton unladen and 374 tons laden
- Sail plan: Brig (Note: She was square-rigged and 250 m^{2} (2,700 sq ft) of sail.)
- Complement: 84, or 98
- Armament: 14 × 24-pounder carronades + 2 × 8-pounder guns; 18 × 24-pounder carronades

The French brig Génie was a Sylphe-class brig launched at Dunkirk in 1808. She was retired from service in 1833.

== Career ==
Under the command of lieutenant de vaisseau de Grave she sailed on 29 January 1809 for Saint Dominique.

On 12 November 1809 Génie captured the 4-gun schooner HMS Haddock, which was under the command of Lieutenant Henry Edwards. (Note: Winfield, Grocott, and Hepper (in his index), agree that the date of the capture was 30 January, but then Hepper gives the date in the text as 12 November. Lloyd's List and French sources also give the date as 12 November.)

Haddock was on her way from Jamaica with dispatches, when at 1:30pm she sighted a brig that began to give chase. In her attempt to escape, Haddock threw her guns, shot and stores overboard. Still, the brig gained. Haddock surrendered at 8:30pm, having first thrown her signals and dispatches overboard.

The encounter occurred in the Atlantic, or the Channel. Lloyd's List gives the approximate location as 48°56′N 16°0′W, which would put the capture in the Atlantic.

On 16 November Génie captured two more vessels. One was Lusitania, Carman, master, which had been sailing from Grenada to London. The second was Fortune, of Bristol, Hare, master, which had been sailing from St Croix to London. The Frenchmen plundered Lusitania and then put the captured crews on board her. Next the Frenchmen sank Fortune and Haddock and let Lusitania depart. Lusitania arrived at Portsmouth on 25 November.

French newspaper accounts credited Génie with the capture of three merchant vessels. They also mentioned that Haddock was carrying some chests of silver.

Vessel	Burthen	Crew
Fortune	260	18
Lusitania	250	16
Creole	300	28

Génie sailed on to Norway. Between 10 January and 6 December 1810 she sailed to the Texel from Bergen.

The Dutch seized Génie at the surrender of Nieuwedieppe on 4 May 1814. She was subsequently returned to the French. Under the command of lieutenant de vaisseau Loyer-Deslandes between 23 April and 1 June 1814 she carried Vice-Admiral Verhuell and his staff from the Texel to Havre.

Between 12 November and 24 December 1822 Génie, under the command of lieutenant de vaisseau de Maud'huy, carried from Brest to Cadiz funds that the frigate Antigone had brought from Vera Cruz and Havana. Génie then sailed to Martinique.

Between 3 April and 20 June 1824, Génie, under the command of lieutenant de vaisseau Bourdais, transported the consul and vice-consul of France to Louisiana from Martinique to New Orleans, via San Juan, Puerto Rico, and Havana. She then carried lieutenant de vaisseau Samouel, who had been entrusted with a mission to Mexico, and returned to the mouth of the Mississippi.

On 28 November 1825 Génie, under the command of capitaine de frégate Martel carried passengers from Brest to Havana and Martinique. Between 28 February and 27 October 1825, she visited Newfoundland, and then returned to Brest.

Between 1 February 1826 and 17 August Génie, under the command of capitaine de frégate Martel, sailed from Brest to Fort Royal, Martinique. She then sailed from Guadeloupe to Havana, where she was stationed for a period. She next sailed from Havana to Vera Cruz, and returned to Brest via Havana.
