= Lusitania (1805 ship) =

British merchant vessel launched in 1804 or 1805

History

United Kingdom
- Name: Lusitania
- Owner: Various
- Builder: Wells, or Wales
- Launched: 1805, or 1804
- Fate: Last listed 1838

General characteristics
- Tons burthen: 243 (bm), or 244, or 245 (bm), or 243 (bm)
- Complement: 18
- Armament: 1805:6 × 4-pounder guns; 1807:10 × 9-pounder guns; 1813(1):2 × 12-pounder guns + 8 × 9-pounder carronades; 1813(2):6 guns

Lusitania was a British merchant vessel launched in 1804. She emerges from the general background for two notable events in her history, one in 1813 when the French Navy captured and released her, and then between 1826 and 1830, for a whaling voyage. She was probably wrecked in 1834.

== Career ==
Lusitania first appeared in Lloyd's Register (LR) in 1805.

| Year | Master | Owner | Trade | Source |
|---|---|---|---|---|
| 1805 | J.Carman | Amsted & Co. | Yarmouth | LR |
| 1807 | J.Carman | Roberts & Co. | London–Grenada; London-CGH | LR |

On 27 August 1807, Captain John Carman received a letter of marque for Lusitania.

On 16 November 1809, the French brig Génie captured Lusitania, Carman, master, at 48°56′N 16°00′W. Four days earlier, Génie had captured the schooner HMS Haddock, which had been carrying dispatches from Jamaica.

Génie also captured Fortune, of Bristol, Hare, master, which had been sailing from St Croix to London. The Frenchmen plundered Lusitania and then put the captured crews on board her. Next the Frenchmen sank Fortune and Haddock, and let Lusitania depart. Lusitania arrived at Portsmouth on 25 November.

| Year | Master | Owner | Trade | Source |
|---|---|---|---|---|
| 1810 | J.Carmen; H.Kaar; Bennett | Roberts & Co. | London–Grenada | LR |
| 1810 | Bennett | Buckle & Co. | London–Brazils | LR |

=== Capture and release ===
In 1813, Lusitania's owner was Buckle, and her master changed from Bennett to Johnston.

On 27 November 1813, Lusitania and four other merchant vessels left Portsmouth in a convoy under escort by HMS Severn. The other four were:

- Blendon Hall, 473 tons (bm), Barr, master, which had been sailing from London to Bermuda;
- John O'Gaunt, 426 tons (bm), P. Inglis, master, which had been sailing from London to Martinique;
- Aurora, Scheidt, master, which had been sailing to Amelia Island; and,
- Superb, 130 tons (bm), R. Roberts, master, which had been sailing from Gibraltar to England.

Due to a heavy storm, the five merchantmen lost contact with the convoy and its escort. On 6 December, they were in the Atlantic Ocean when the French frigate Clorinde captured all five (44°30′N 10°30′W). The French took off the crews of four vessels and scuttled three. They kept Lusitania as a cartel and put all their captives aboard her. In their haste, they failed to sink Blenden Hall. They then permitted Lusitania to sail to a British port.

On 18 December, Challenger brought Blenden Hall into Plymouth. There, Blenden Hall was reunited with her crew, who had arrived that same day on Lusitania.

=== Voyages to Australia ===
The Register of Shipping (RS) for 1823, showed Lusitania with Langdon, master, Buckle, owner, and trade London-New South Wales. (Note: The Australian Dictionary of Biography reports that Langdon owned Lusitania at the time of her voyages to Australia.) She had departed London 6 July 1821, with general cargo and passengers. She had arrived in the River Derwent, Van Diemen's Land on 28/29 October 1821. Langdon made a second voyage that reached Sydney in May 1823.

In 1825, Lusitania underwent a large repair. Thereafter she is described as a bark.

Also, on 10 October 1825, Lusitania, Biels, master, rescued the six crewmen of Three Brothers, which had foundered in the Mediterranean Sea at (37°48′N 25°00′E).

| Year | Master | Owner | Trade | Source & notes |
|---|---|---|---|---|
| 1826 | Bailes; G.Grew; Ross | Sturge | London–Straits [of Gibraltar] | LR; new deck 1818, new wales & large repair 1825 |
| 1826 | Bales; Ross | Sturge | London–Alexandria; London–Sierra Leone | Register of Shipping; repairs 1821 & new top and sides, and large repair 1825 |

=== Whaling ===
Lusitania left Britain on 21 October 1826, for a whaling voyage to Timor. Her owner was Thomas Sturge & Co., and her master was Robert Ross. She was at St Iago, Cape Verde, on 5 December. She sighted the Australian coast near Shark Bay on 21 April 1827. By 20 May, she was at Timor, where she landed five Dutch missionaries. A few days later, on 1 June, Lusitania was at Coupang. Between 21 and 25 November 1828, and 2 February 1829, she was whaling off New Guinea. In November 1828, she was at Saint George's Channel, where she encountered many "old friends" among the locals, suggesting that she had been that way before. On 2 February, she spoke Cyrus. Nine days later Lusitania was at Carteret Bay, where she traded with islanders who had come some distance overland to trade a hog for an old whaling lance. Lusitania was again at Coupang on 27 April. By 1829, illness aboard Lusitania was so bad that she had to return home. She returned via Delagoa Bay and the Cape of Good Hope. She returned to Britain on 26 January 1830, with 500 casks and 36 tanks of whale oil.

=== Coaster ===
On her return Sturge sold Lusitania and she became a London coaster.

| Year | Master | Owner | Trade | Source & notes |
|---|---|---|---|---|
| 1830 | Ross; H.Watts | Sturge; J.Brown | London–Sierra Leone; London coaster | Register of Shipping; large repair 1825 |
| 1833 | M'Donald | J.Brown | London coaster | Register of Shipping; small repairs 1830 & large repairs 1831 |

== Fate ==
Lloyd's List did report on 16 September 1834, that Lusitania, Brown, master, had stranded on Fastbro Reef (possibly Falsterborev). She had filled with water and was not expected to be got off.

Lusitania was last listed in Lloyd's Register in 1838, but the listing had been unchanged for several years and showed no owner or trade.
