= HMS Haddock =

UK naval schooner 1805–1809

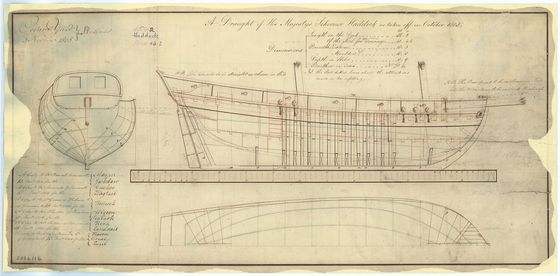
- Haddock body plan

History

United Kingdom
- Name: HMS Haddock
- Ordered: 23 June 1803
- Builder: Goodrich & Co. (prime contractor), shipyard of Isaac Skinner, Bermuda
- Laid down: 1803
- Launched: 21 March 1805
- Commissioned: April 1805
- Captured: 12 November 1809
- Fate: Sunk four days after capture

General characteristics
- Type: Ballahoo-class schooner
- Tons burthen: 7041/94 (bm)
- Length: 55 ft 2 in (16.8 m) (overall); 40 ft 10 1/2 in (12.5 m) (keel)
- Beam: 18 ft 0 in (5.5 m)
- Depth of hold: 9 ft 0 in (2.7 m)
- Sail plan: Schooner
- Complement: 20
- Armament: 4 × 12-pounder carronades

HMS Haddock was a Royal Navy schooner of four 12-pounder carronades and a crew of 20. The prime contractor for the vessel was Goodrich & Co., in Bermuda, and she was launched in 1805.

On Thursday 21st inst launched off the stocks at Mr Isaac Skinner's shipyard his Majesty's Schooner "Haddock". The above schooner is said (by every merchant and shipbuilder) to be the completest vessel ever built in Bermuda

— The Royal Gazette, 30 March 1805

Haddock only sailed for some three to four years before the French captured and sank her in 1809 near the English Channel. This schooner was the only Royal Navy ship ever to use the name.

== Service ==
She was commissioned in April 1805 under Lieutenant John Buddle. Between 9 October and 15 November she was in Portsmouth, refitting. At this time the Admiralty had her lines taken. She would then act as the model for the subsequent Cuckoo-class schooners.

By 4 August 1805, when she sailed from Jamaica, she was under Lieutenant Edward Foley. She brought with her the mails for Falmouth originally intended for the Lord Chesterfield Packet. (Note: Lord Chesterfield Packet had been captured, recaptured, and sunk on her way to Jamaica.) She also brought with her the former master of Leicester Packet. (Note: A privateer had captured Leicester Packet and carried her into Guadeloupe.) Haddock reached Scilly on 30 September, and arrived at Falmouth on 1 October 1805.

Haddock sailed for Jamaica on 11 December. On 22 May 1806 she captured Arrogante, for which head money for 19 men was paid in March 1828. (Note: This is from the London Gazette. However, in 1806 Diadem captured the brig Arrogante of two guns off Montevideo. It is an open question as to whether there is a coincidence, or Haddock was acting as a tender to Diadem, or the item in the newspaper represents an error.) In 1808 Lieutenant Charles William Selwyn took command.

On 6 September, the American vessel Nancy, Ringhaven, master, arrived at Jamaica. She had been sailing from Havana to Jamaica when Haddock detained her and sent her in.

== Fate ==
On 12 November 1809 the 18-gun French brig Génie captured Haddock, which was under the command of Lieutenant Henry Edwards. (Note: Winfield, Grocott, and Hepper (in his index), agree that the date of the capture was 30 January, but then Hepper gives the date in the text as 12 November. Lloyd's List and French sources also give the date as 12 November.)

Haddock was on her way from Jamaica with dispatches, when at 1:30pm she sighted a brig that began to give chase. In her attempt to escape, Haddock threw her guns, shot and stores overboard. Still, the brig gained. Haddock surrendered at 8:30pm, having first thrown her signals and dispatches overboard.

The encounter occurred in the Atlantic, or the Channel. Lloyd's List gives the approximate location as 48°56′N 16°0′W, which would put the capture in the Atlantic. Génie was an Sylphe-class naval brig armed with eighteen 24-pounder carronades; she was under the command of lieutenant de vaisseau de Grave.

On 16 November Génie captured two more vessels. One was Lusitania, Carman, master, which had been sailing from Grenada to London. The second was Fortune, of Bristol, Hare, master, which had been sailing from St Croix to London. The Frenchmen plundered Lusitania and then put the captured crews on board her. Next the Frenchmen sank Fortune and Haddock and let Lusitania depart. Lusitania arrived at Portsmouth on 25 November.
