= HMS Telegraph (1813) =

American-built warship

History

United States
- Name: Vengeance
- Builder: New York
- Launched: 1812
- Captured: 1 January 1813

United Kingdom
- Name: HMS Telegraph
- Launched: 1812
- Acquired: 1 January 1813, by capture
- Commissioned: 1813
- Fate: Wrecked 20 January 1817

General characteristics
- Class & type: Schooner (1812–13); Sloop-of-war (1813–17)
- Tons burthen: 180 tons (bm)
- Propulsion: Sails
- Sail plan: Schooner
- Complement: Vengeance:15; HMS Telegraph:60
- Armament: 12 x twelve-pounder carronades (HMS Telegraph)

HMS Telegraph was built in 1812 in New York as the American letter of marque Vengeance. The Royal Navy captured her in 1813 and took her into service as the 14-gun schooner or gunbrig Telegraph. Over a period of only about two years she took numerous small prizes and caused the destruction of a French 16-gun brig. A gale caused the wrecking of Telegraph in 1817.

== Capture of Vengeance ==
On 1 January 1813, the 36-gun fifth-rate 18-pounder frigate Phoebe captured Vengeance. Vengeance was an American letter of marquee schooner of 180 tons and a 15-man crew that had been sailing from New York to Bordeaux with a cargo of cotton, coffee, sugar and indigo. Vengeance arrived in Plymouth on 8 January. She was closely followed by Hunter, Judathau Upton, master, an American privateer schooner that Phoebe had also captured. Hunter had been armed with 14 guns but she thrown 12 overboard during the chase. She had a crew of 73 men.

== Prize taking ==
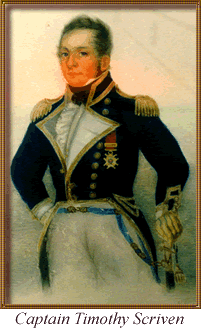

Lieutenant Timothy Scriven commissioned Telegraph at Plymouth. In British service Telegraph was armed with twelve 12-pounder carronades and had a crew of 60 men.

On 12 August 1813 she captured the American schooner Ellen & Emeline after a chase of 44 hours that brought the vessels to within 10 miles of Santander. Ellen & Emeline carried a cargo of silk for New York and was armed with a single 12-pounder gun on a pivot. She was only three hours out of Nantes when Telegraph first sighted her. Then on 23 August Telegraph detained and sent in the American schooner Allen & Adelaide, Booth, master, also from Nantes.

On 12 September Telegraph cut out of Bordeaux four small French vessels:

- lugger Gustave, of 82 tons, from Bordeaux, bound for Nantes;
- chasse maree Unis Amis, of 54 tons, from Bordeaux, bound to Nantes;
- lugger Precieux, of 94 tons, from Bordeaux, bound to Nantes; and
- chasse maree Dunoire, of 68 tons, from Bordeaux, bound to Brest. On 18 September Telegraph arrived at Falmouth with her four French prizes, laden with brandy, wine, and the like. She also destroyed the chasse maree Martha. (Note: The prize money for Scriven for the Martha was £23 2s 11d, with the Admiral getting half that.)

Ten days later she sailed with a convoy of transports for St. Sebastian. On 7 October, she arrived with dispatches for Sir George Collier in Surveillante on the north coast of Spain.

== Telegraph vs Flibustier ==
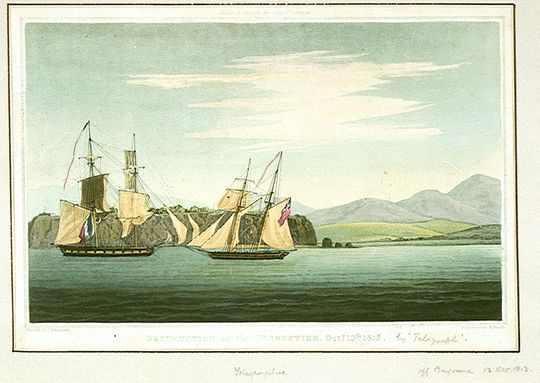
Destruction of the Flibustier Octr 13th 1813. From a sketch by Captn Scriven, National Maritime Museum, Greenwich

On 13 October 1813 Telegraph caused the destruction of the French 16-gun brig Flibustier (1810) in the mouth of the Adour. (Note: Flibustier had been launched in 1810 and was one of 32 vessels of her class.) Flibustier had been in St Jean de Luz sheltering where shore batteries could protect her when she sought to escape because of the approach of Wellington's army. She started out during a "dark and stormy night", but Telegraph immediately pursued her. After an action lasting three-quarters of an hour, the French saw Challenger and Constant coming up to join the engagement. Flibustier's crew set her on fire and escaped ashore. Lieutenant Scriven sent boats to try to save her, but they were unsuccessful and she blew up. Papers found on board showed lieutenant de vaisseau Jean-Jacques-Léonore Daniel had been the commander. She had been armed with sixteen French 24-pounder carronades, two 9-pounder guns, a brass howitzer, and four brass 3-pounder guns. There had been 160 men on board and Scriven reported that from what he saw, the French losses must have been considerable; Telegraph had no casualties. Lloyd's List reported that when Flibustier blew up there were still 30 wounded men aboard. The same report gave her armament as sixteen 32-pounder carronades, two long 9-pounder guns, and four brass 4-pounder guns.

Scriven believed that Flibustier was bound for Santona to relieve the garrison there as her cargo consisted of treasure, arms, ammunition, and salt provisions. He also thought that some of the men who had been aboard her were officers and soldiers for the garrison.

Both armies witnessed the British victory, with the allied army giving three cheers. As a reward for his success Scriven received a promotion to Commander and Telegraph was re-rated as a sloop of war.

== Prize taking again ==
Telegraph took the French galiot Hercules, of 134 tons and five men, bound from Oleron to Nantes on 29 December. The next day she took the French chasse-marée Felicitee, of 60 tons and one man, bound from Bordeaux to Nantes. These may be the vessels described as the chasse-marée that on 4 January 1814 arrived in Plymouth, and the ketch that arrived in Falmouth, both prizes that Telegraph had taken. (Note: The prize money for Felicite was paid in March 1815, with the Admiral's share being £85 7s 3½d. Scriven's share was double that of the Admiral's.)

On 27 February 1814 Telegraph captured the French chasse maree Clemence. Then on 10 March she captured the French dogger (or galliot) North Star from Île de Ré, of 80 tons and five men, also bound for Nantes. The next day Helicon arrived in the Isles of Scilly towing a chasse-marée that Telegraph had taken. The North Star may have been the French galiot Neidsteerm that Telegraph had sent into Plymouth on 5 April.

Telegraph then sailed to the Halifax station. On 3 November Telegraph captured and destroyed the sloop Alert, of 25 tons and a crew of three. Three days later Telegraph was in company with Majestic and Pactolus when they recaptured the brig Recovery. The next day Telegraph captured the sloop Four Brothers, of 20 tons and two men. That same day she destroyed the sloop John, of two men and 30 tons and the schooner Ann, of three men and 32 tons. Later that month Telegraph took the schooner Mary from Philadelphia for Havana and sent her to Bermuda. Bermuda then reported the arrivals of the brig Amy, with flour from Philadelphia, prize to Telegraph, and Mary, prize to Spencer and Telegraph. Telegraph had captured both on 25 November. Amy was of 84 tons and had a crew of eight. Mary was of 110 tons and had a crew of seven.

On 16 November 1814, Telegraph's and Spencer's boats ran the famous American privateer Syren ashore under Cape May, where her crew destroyed her. Syren, a 7-gun schooner out of Baltimore and under the command of J.D. Daniels, had had a successful cruise in which she captured several prizes. One was Sir John Sherbooke. Another had taken place on 12 July 1814 when Syren captured the Royal Navy's 4-gun schooner Landrail after a fight of 40 minutes with casualties on both sides.

The next month, on 11 December, Telegraph captured Rose. (Note: On 8 February 1817 Scriven and the crew of Telegraph at the time received a grant of £639 10s 7d to share. Scriven's share was £91 5s 4½d. The share for an ordinary seaman was £3 16s 4½d.)

At the end of December, on the 28th, Telegraph captured Trim, of four men and 40 tons. Then in the new year, on 12 January 1815, Telegraph captured Attempt of four men and 52 tons. Lastly, five days later, Telegraph captured the schooner William, of eight men and 105 tons, near Cape Hatteras.

In September 1815 Lieutenant Richard Crossman took command of Telegraph. In 1816 Lieutenant Jonathan Little replaced him. On 5 October, Telegraph seized the smuggling vessel Betsey and her cargo of spirits. (Note: The capture was worth £51 5s 4d to Little and £1 12s 0½d for an ordinary seaman.) The Collector of His Majesty's Excise, in Falmouth, also paid bounty-money for the three men who were on Betsey when Telegraph captured her. (Note: This amounted to £11 9s 9d to Little and 5s 4½d for an ordinary seaman.)

== Loss ==
During the night of 19–20 January 1817 Telegraph was anchored off the Eastern Hoe in Plymouth Sound. A gale came up that parted her cables and wrecked her on the point of Mount Batten, at the entrance of Catwater. The same gale caused the loss of Jasper. Telegraph's only fatality was a seaman whom she crushed to death against her side. Several other men were injured. (Another report gives her losses as two dead out of her 50-man crew.) The court martial (on 28 January 1817), attributed the loss to short cables and insufficiently heavy anchors.

== Post-script ==
On 31 December 1818 Parliament voted a grant to be distributed to all the vessels that had served under Admiral Lord Viscount Kieth in 1813 and 1814. Telegraph was among that number. (Note: If we assume that Scriven qualified as a Captain of the Third Class, then his share would have been £106 3s 11d, and that of an ordinary seaman £1 14s 7d. For an ordinary seaman that would represent about a month's pay.)
