= HMS Wagtail (1806) =

History

United Kingdom
- Name: HMS Wagtail
- Ordered: 11 December 1805
- Builder: James Lovewell, Great Yarmouth
- Laid down: February 1806
- Launched: 12 April 1806
- Fate: Wrecked 13 February 1807

General characteristics
- Class & type: Cuckoo-class schooner
- Tons burthen: 751/94 (bm)
- Length: 56 ft 4 in (17.2 m) (overall); 42 ft 4 1/8 in (12.9 m) (keel)
- Beam: 18 ft 3 in (5.6 m)
- Draught: Unladen: 5 ft 1 1/2 in (1.6 m); Laden: 7 ft 6 1/2 in (2.3 m)
- Depth of hold: 8 ft 5 in (2.6 m)
- Sail plan: Schooner
- Complement: 20
- Armament: 4 × 12-pounder carronades

HMS Wagtail was a Royal Navy Cuckoo-class schooner launched in 1806 by James Lovewell at Great Yarmouth. Like many of her class and the related Ballahoo-class schooners, she succumbed to the perils of the sea relatively early in her career.

She was commissioned in 1806 under Lieutenant William Cullis. She was wrecked on 13 February 1807 at Vila Franca do Campo, São Miguel in the Azores, three hours after her sister ship Woodcock was wrecked, and near Woodcock's water-logged remains. Both vessels had been anchored in the shelter of an islet off the town when a gale came up. Because of the storm they were unable to clear the land.

Wagtail's cables held until 8 pm. Then her cables parted, and with waves breaking over her, Cullis ran her ashore. One man of the 18 men in her crew drowned.
