= HMS Sealark (1806) =

History

United Kingdom
- Name: HMS Sealark
- Ordered: 11 December 1805
- Builder: William Wheaton, Brixham
- Laid down: February 1806
- Launched: 1 August 1806
- Fate: Foundered 18 June 1809

General characteristics
- Class & type: Cuckoo-class schooner
- Tons burthen: 75 68/94 (bm)
- Length: 56 ft 4 in (17.2 m) (overall); 42 ft 4 1/4 in (12.9 m) (keel)
- Beam: 18 ft 4 in (5.6 m)
- Draught: Unladen: 3 ft 10 in (1.2 m); Laden: 7 ft 8 in (2.3 m)
- Depth of hold: 8 ft 6 in (2.6 m)
- Sail plan: Schooner
- Complement: 20
- Armament: 4 × 12-pounder carronades

HMS Sealark was a Royal Navy Cuckoo-class schooner armed with four 12-pounder carronades and manned by a crew of 20. She was built by William Wheaton at Brixham and launched in 1806. Like many of her class and the related Ballahoo-class schooners, she succumbed to the perils of the sea relatively early in her career.

== Service ==
She was commissioned in October 1806 under Lieutenant Thomas Banks for service in the North Sea. Sealark was at the surrender of the Danish Fleet after the Battle of Copenhagen on 7 September. The prize money amounted to £3 8s for an ordinary seaman, or slightly over two months wages. In 1809 she came under the command of Lieutenant James Procter.

== Fate ==
On 18 June 1809 she was sailing in company with Blake in the North Sea. A heavy sea swamped her and she sank immediately. Only one member of her crew survived. On 29 June 1809 The Times printed the following: "The Sealark schooner has been upset on the coast of Holland and all hands on board, excepting one man, unfortunately perished."
