= HMS Woodcock (1806) =

UK Cuckoo-class naval schooner 1806–1807

History

United Kingdom
- Name: HMS Woodcock
- Ordered: 11 December 1805
- Builder: Crane & Holmes, Great Yarmouth
- Laid down: February 1806
- Launched: 11 April 1806
- Fate: Wrecked 13 February 1807

General characteristics
- Class & type: Cuckoo-class schooner
- Tons burthen: 751/94 (bm)
- Length: 56 ft 2 in (17.1 m) (overall); 42 ft 4 1/8 in (12.9 m) (keel)
- Beam: 18 ft 5 in (5.6 m)
- Draught: Unladen: 5 ft 0 in (1.5 m); Laden: 7 ft 6 in (2.3 m)
- Depth of hold: 8 ft 5 in (2.6 m)
- Sail plan: Schooner
- Complement: 20
- Armament: 4 × 12-pounder Carronades

HMS Woodcock was a Royal Navy Cuckoo-class schooner. Crane & Holmes built and launched her at Great Yarmouth in 1806. Like many of her class and the related Ballahoo-class schooners, she succumbed to the perils of the sea relatively early in her career.

She was commissioned in 1806 under Lieutenant Isaac Charles Smith Collett. She was wrecked 13 February 1807 at Vila Franca do Campo, São Miguel in the Azores. She and her sister ship Wagtail had anchored there when a gale came up. Because of the storm it was impossible to clear the land and at 5pm Collett ran her ashore after her anchors had parted and water was continuously washing over her. Lines were passed to the shore and all her crew made it safely to land. Wagtail was wrecked three hours later.
