= HMS Racer (1812) =

UK naval schooner 1812–1814

History

United States
- Name: Independence
- Builder: New York
- Launched: 1811
- Captured: 9 November 1812

United Kingdom
- Name: Racer
- Acquired: 1812 by purchase of a prize
- Fate: Wrecked 10 October 1814

General characteristics
- Type: Schooner
- Tons burthen: 250 (exact) (bm)
- Length: Overall:93 ft 4 in (28.4 m); Keel:75 ft 11 1/2 in (23.2 m)
- Beam: 24 ft 10 1/2 in (7.6 m)
- Depth of hold: 9 ft 8 in (2.9 m)
- Propulsion: Sails
- Complement: 60
- Armament: 12 × 12-pounder carronades + 2 × 6-pounder chase guns

HMS Racer was the American schooner Independence, launched in 1811 in New York, that the British Royal Navy captured in 1812 and took into service. She was wrecked in the Florida Straits on 10 October 1814.

== Capture ==
HMS Medusa captured the American schooner Independence, of 213 tons (bm), four guns, and 23 men, on 9 November 1812. Independence had been sailing from Bayonne to New York with a cargo of brandy, silks, etc. Although British records report that she was a privateer, she was at most a letter of marque, though she does not appear in a compendium of American privateers and letters of marque.

== Career and loss ==
Her first commander, in 1813 to 1814, was Lieutenant J. Jullan. Lieutenant Henry Freeman Young Pogson replaced Jullan. She underwent small repairs at Plymouth between January and August 1813.

The Marquis of Wellington requested a naval demonstration on 10 November 1813 at Socoa in the rear of the French lines of communication. Admiral Keith dispatched four vessels to Saint-Jean-de-Luz: HMS Vesuvius, Challenger, Sparrow, and Racer. However, the swell was so heavy that the naval vessels could do little beyond exchanging fire with the shore batteries there.

== Fate ==
Racer was cruising off the southern American coast when a large privateer chased her. Racer escaped but when Pogson decided to return to Jamaica she wrecked on the Cay Sal Bank in the Florida Straits. Pogson got his men on to the Cay. He then sailed a small boat to Nassau, Bahamas, and brought back assistance.

== Post-script ==
Parliament voted a special grant to the officers and crews that served under Admiral Lord Viscount Keith on the north coast of Spain and the coast of France in the years 1812, 1813, and 1814. Racer was among the many vessels that qualified for the grant for service in 1813 and 1814. (Note: The grant was paid in three tranches. Second class shares (that of a lieutenant), were worth £23 11s 11d, £17 1s 3d, and £11 7s 6d. Sixth-class shares, those of an ordinary seaman, we worth £2 1s 1d, £1 s 5d, and 18s 4d.)
