= Ogle Castle (1821 ship) =

History

United Kingdom
- Name: Ogle Castle
- Namesake: Ogle Castle
- Owner: 1821: Brown; 1825: William Dalrymple Dowson & Co.
- Builder: Thomas White, Cowes
- Launched: 27 January 1821
- Fate: Wrecked 3 November 1825

General characteristics
- Tons burthen: 513, or 51360/94 (bm)
- Length: 117 ft 2 in (35.7 m)
- Beam: 31 ft 6 in (9.6 m)

Ogle Castle was launched at Cowes in 1821. She made two complete voyages to India sailing under a license from the British East India Company (EIC). She was lost with all aboard on 3 November 1825 while returning to London from her third.

== Career ==
Ogle Castle first appeared in Lloyd's Register (LR) in 1821. In 1813 the EIC had lost its monopoly on the trade between India and Britain. British ships, Ogle Castle being one, were then free to sail to India or the Indian Ocean under a license from the EIC.

| Year | Master | Owner | Trade | Source |
|---|---|---|---|---|
| 1821 | Crosley | Brown | Cowes–London; London–Bombay | LR |

On 18 May 1821 she sailed at the same time as Blendon Hall. Ogle Castle arrived at Bombay on 5 October, but Blendon Hall had not been heard from since 8 June when she was at the Cape Verde Islands. As it turned out, unfortunately, Blendon Hall had wrecked. Ogle Castle sailed for London on 20 November 1821, but it was expected that she would be delayed by three weeks as she was expected to be taking on pepper on the Coromandel Coast. Ogle Castle arrived at the Cape on 5 February 1822, bound for London and having come from Bombay. She sailed from the Cape on 10 February and from St Helena on the 24th. She arrived at Falmouth on 6 May and sailed the next day for London. The various ship arrival and departure (SAD) reports referred to her master as Crosby or Crosley.

On 14 November Ogle Castle, Pearson, master, sailed from Gravesend for Bengal. She arrived at the Cape on 24 February 1823 and sailed on 3 March. She arrived at Madras on 2 May. Ogle Castle, bound for London, had to put back at Bengal on 2 September to be docked. By 10 October she had been repaired and was ready to leave the dock. Ogle Castle, Brown, master, sailed from Bengal on 31 October and St Helena on 30 January 1824. She arrived at Deal on 30 March. On 1 April a strong wind drove Ogle Castle on to HMS Ramillies's hawse. Ogle Castle lost her boat but sustained little damage. She arrived at Gravesend on 6 April.

| Year | Master | Owner | Trade | Source |
|---|---|---|---|---|
| 1825 | Wynton | Dawson & Co. | Cowes–Madras | LR |

On 28 October 1824 Ogle Castle, Weynton, master, sailed from Gravesend, bound for Bombay. On 8 November she was at Cowes, and she sailed from there on 27 November. On 14 December she was at Madeira and immediately sailed on for Bombay. On 8 February 1825 she arrived at the Cape and sailed from there on the 11th. She arrived at Bombay on 4 May.

== Fate ==
On 3 November 1825 Ogle Castle, inward bound from Bombay for London, stranded on the Goodwin Sands in a heavy gale and broke up, with the loss of over 100 lives. Captain James Weynton, all officers, crew, and passengers drowned.

It took some days for the wreck to be identified as the Ogle Castle. A report that a French fishing boat had rescued 17 crew men and taken them to Calais proved to be false.

For some weeks thereafter numerous bales of cotton, and some of silk, from her cargo, as well as some chests, came ashore at Margate, Dover, Ostend, and the Dutch coast. A part of the ship itself came ashore at Nieuport.

Although some contemporary press reports stated that when she was lost she was sailing on a one-voyage contract for the EIC, the standard references for the EIC's ships do not confirm this.
