= HMS Albacore (1804) =

Sloop of the Royal Navy

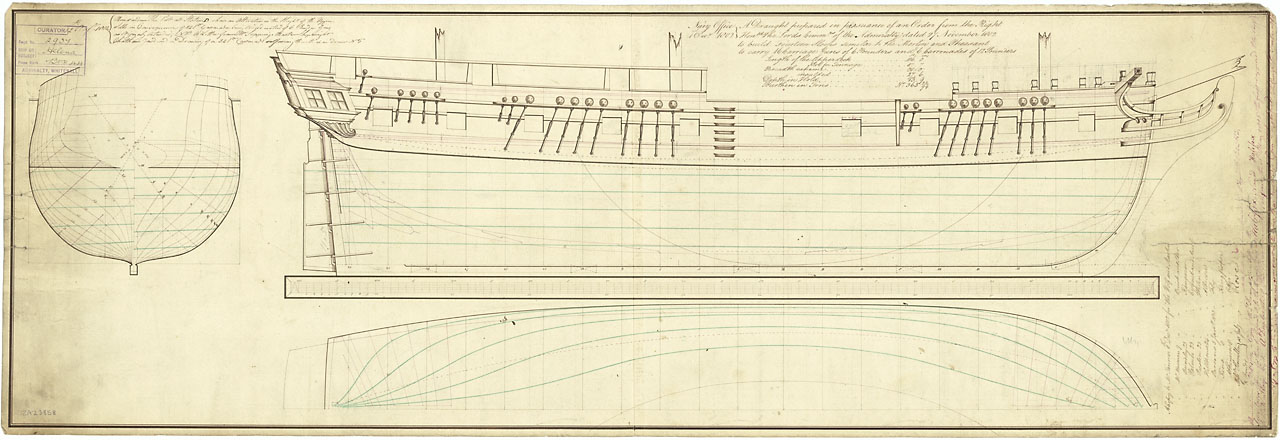
- Albacore

History

United Kingdom
- Name: Albacore
- Namesake: Albacore
- Ordered: 27 November 1802
- Builder: James Martin Hillhouse, Bristol
- Laid down: March 1803
- Launched: 10 May 1804
- Commissioned: May 1804
- Fate: Sold 1815

General characteristics
- Tons burthen: 36965/94 (bm)
- Complement: 121
- Armament: Upper deck:16 × 32-pounder carronades; QD: 6 × 12-pounder carronades; Fc: 2 × 12-pounder carronades

United Kingdom
- Name: Albicore
- Launched: 1815 by purchase
- Fate: Lost 12 October 1821

General characteristics
- Tons burthen: 375 (bm)

HMS Albacore (or HMS Albicore) was launched in 1804 in Bristol. She participated in two notable actions. The British Royal Navy sold her in 1815 and she became a merchantman, sailing out of Guernsey. She was lost on 12 October 1821 while sailing from Buenos Aires to Barbados.

== Royal Navy ==
Commander Major Jacob Henniker commissioned Albacore in May 1804 for service in Home waters.

In 1804 Albacore and Henniker were under Sir James Saumarez, commander-in-chief at Guernsey.

Saumarez put Albacore under the orders of Commodore Philippe d'Auvergne, who directed Henniker to intercept French vessels passing along the Normandy coast. On 8 October 1804 Albacore chased five luggers armed with bow guns that then anchored under cover of a shore battery near Cape Gris Nez de Flamanville. The following day Henniker brought Albacore within two cables of the surf under the direction of the pilot, and opened fire with round and grape shot. The enemy vessels were driven ashore until they were covered in surf. Their crews then scrambled up the beach carrying their wounded. Albacore hauled off, hulled in several places and with her main and main-top-masts damaged; still, she had no casualties. When he passed on the 16th., Captain Henniker saw that the five luggers were still there, breaking up under the heavy surf.

On 26 March 1806, Margaretta, Smith, master, arrived at Portsmouth. She had been sailing to Bordeaux when Albicore detained her.

By April Albicore was under the command of Commander John Burn on the Jersey station. On 7 April Albicore captured the Prussian galliot Beerbchen. Then one week later, on the 14th, Albicore captured Argo. The Prussian ship Argo had been sailing from Liverpool to Riga when Albicore detained her.

In May Albicore sent into Plymouth the American vessel Merchant, Casin, master, which had been sailing from Charleston. Then Albicore and the privateer Hector sent into Falmouth the Danish vessel Graff Bernstorf, Bohlmann, master. She had been sailing from Charleston to Hambro when the British detained her. (Note: Hector, of 263 tons (bm), ten 18&2-pounder guns, and 40 men under the command of Captain John Swinburn had acquired a letter of marque on 10 April 1806.)

On 6 May 1807 the boats of Inconstant, the flagship of Vice-Admiral James Saumarez, captured the French ship Julia. Albacore and Jamaica shared in the proceeds of the capture.

By some accounts, between 1809 and 1811 Albacore was on the Guernsey station under the command of Corbet James D'Auvergne. However, during that time he was captain of HMS Autumn. He was promoted to post-captain on 1 August 1811.

In August 1811, Commander Thomas Henry Davies was appointed to command Albacore on the Guernsey station. On 25 November 1812, Albicore recaptured the schooner Endeavour.

At dawn on 19 December, Albacore, together with the 12-gun schooner Pickle and nine merchantmen found themselves becalmed off the Lizard in the presence of the French frigate Gloire, commanded by Captain Rousin, which had sailed from Le Havre the previous day. Albacore engaged as soon as there was some wind. In the exchange of fire Albacore suffered Lieutenant Harman killed and six or seven men wounded before she pulled back to repair damage. Gloire did not follow up her advantage and fled. Pickle then closed and at about 3pm the 12-gun brig-sloop Borer and the 4-gun cutter Landrail also came up and Albacore, having repaired her damage, joined them and opened fire with her bow-chasers at about 5pm. Gloire replied with her stern guns but continued to run until by midnight she was out of sight.

On 2 June 1813 Davies sailed Albacore to West Africa. Commander Davies was promoted to post-captain on 19 February 1814.

Commander James Boxer assumed command of Albacore on 15 February 1814 at Rio Janeiro. However, on 21 April he became acting captain of HMS Aquilon. Not long thereafter he sailed Aquilon to England and there was promoted to post-captain. Lieutenant Joseph Patey assumed command as captain pro-tempore. In December 1814 Albacore chased the American privateer True Blooded Yankee into Salvador.

On 20 December 1814 Manchester Packet repelled an attack by an American privateer at 17°9′S 35°50′W, but had to put into Salvador to repair. (Note: Manchester Packet, of 238 tons burthen, had been built in New York in 1806.) She left on 3 January 1815 under convoy by Albacore. True Blooded Yankey was sold at Salvador to defray the expenses of her stay.

On 18 March 1815, HMS Inconstant and Albacore recaptured the brig Acorn and her cargo.

Patey was superseded in July 1815 when Albacore returned to England. Two days after his supersession, on 18 July he was promoted to the rank of commander.

On 20 June 1815 Commander William Wolrige was appointed to command Albacore, and he recommissioned her.

Disposal: The "Principal Officers and Commissioners of His Majesty's Navy" offered the "Albicore sloop of 370 tons", lying at Plymouth, for sale on 14 December 1815. Albacore was sold for £1,900 at Plymouth on that day.

== Merchantman ==
Albicore first appeared in Lloyd's Register (LR) in 1816 with J. Thorbin, master, Prienix, owner, and trade Plymouth–Guernsey.

Year	Master	Owner	Trade	Source
1818	J.Thorbin	Prieulix	Plymouth–Guernsey	LR
1822	Thobon	Preleux	Plymouth–Lisbon	Register of Shipping; Albecore

== Fate ==
Albicore, of Guernsey, Taylor, master, was lost at Bahia on 12 October 1821 with the loss of three of her crew. She was on a voyage from Buenos Aires to Barbados.
