= HMS Landrail (1806) =

History

United Kingdom
- Name: HMS Landrail
- Ordered: 11 December 1805
- Builder: Thomas Sutton, Ringmore, Devon
- Laid down: January 1806
- Launched: 18 June 1806
- Captured: 12 July 1814; Recaptured September 1814
- Fate: Sold c.1818

General characteristics
- Class & type: Cuckoo-class schooner
- Tons burthen: 7535/94 (bm)
- Length: 56 ft 3 1/2 in (17.2 m) (overall); 42 ft 4 1/4 in (12.9 m) (keel)
- Beam: 18 ft 3 1/2 in (5.6 m)
- Draught: Unladen: 4 ft 6 in (1.4 m); Laden: 7 ft 6 in (2.3 m)
- Depth of hold: 8 ft 7 in (2.6 m)
- Sail plan: Schooner
- Complement: 20
- Armament: 4 × 12-pounder carronades

HMS Landrail was a Cuckoo-class schooner built by Thomas Sutton at Ringmore, Teignmouth. Like all her class she carried four 12-pounder carronades and had a crew of 20. She had a relatively uneventful career during the Napoleonic Wars and the War of 1812 until 1814 when she was taken in a notable action, and then retaken. She was paid off in October 1818 and sold thereafter.

== Service ==
The first mention of her service occurred in 1812 when she operated in the Channel under the command of Lieutenant John Hill.On the afternoon of 18 December 1812 Landrail chased the French 40-gun frigate Gloire in company with the 18-gun ship-sloop Albacore, the 12-gun schooner Pickle and the 12-gun brig-sloop Borer. Albacore and Pickle had found themselves close to the much larger French ship off The Lizard at daybreak in light winds. In the exchange of fire Albacore suffered one man killed and six or seven wounded before she pulled back. Borer and Landrail closed to assist, but Gloire managed to outrun her pursuers. In the engagement Landrail did not actually fire her guns. As James put it, "for the Landrail to have fired her 12-pounders would have been a farce."

In 1813 Landrail performed a number of duties, including accompanying a convoy to the Baltic and carrying dispatches to Heligoland. On 17 June Landrail captured the Danish sloop Resolutionen, C. P. Albech, Master. Then some months later, on 13 November, she captured the Danish vessel Hoffnung.

On 6 January 1814 Landrail arrived at the Isles of Scilly where she was put under quarantine. She brought with her the ship Duck, bound from Newfoundland to Portugal, which also carried the crews of a number of merchant vessels that two French frigates had captured. On 22 March she arrived at Falmouth from Bordeaux with a French officer with dispatches. On 21 June Lieutenant Robert Daniel Lancaster took command.

== Capture and recapture ==
On 12 July Landrail was in the Channel, on her way to Gibraltar with dispatches when she encountered the American privateer Syren under Captain J.D. Daniels. Syren carried seven cannons, one long 12 on a travelling (pivoting) carriage, four long 6-pounders and two 18-pounder carronades, and a crew of 50 men. (Note: Most accounts give Syren’s crew as numbering 75-80 men. However Maclay gives it as 50, which is more consistent with her having sent in six prizes, most of which would have required a prize crew.) This gave her a broadside of 42 pounds, compared to Landrail 's 24 pounds, and a crew two and a half times larger.

Syren had had a successful cruise, capturing six British vessels, and she gave chase. Lancaster attempted to escape, keeping up a running fight of a little over an hour, and a close action of 40 minutes. During the action, one of Landrail's engaged carronades was disabled. She turned, so as to be able to use the two on her other broadside. Landrail and Syren ended up close together with the muzzles of their guns touching. Eventually Landrail, out of small-arms ammunition, with the breechings of her carronades carried away, struck. She had suffered five, or seven men wounded. Her sails were riddled with shot-holes and her hull had taken many hits. Syren had three men killed and 15 wounded. Some American reports give the Syren’s losses as only three men wounded.

On 28 August, the Cruizer-class brig-sloop Wasp, under the command of Lieutenant Richard Crawford (acting Commander), recaptured Landrail while she was on her way to the United States. Wasp took Landrail into Halifax.

However, the officers and crew of Landrail remained in captivity in the US.

Syren returned to the United States but as she approached the Delaware River the British blockading ships gave chase. To escape the boats of Spencer and Telegraph, on 16 November Syren ran ashore under Cape May. Her crew set her on fire before making their escape.

In late 1814 or early 1815, while on the Halifax station under Lieutenant (Gustavus) Robert Rochfort, Landrail successfully repulsed a force of five American privateers. The American vessels were the 10-gun Charles Stewart of Boston, the 4-gun Cumberland of Portland, the 4-gun Fame of Thomastown, the sloop Jefferson of Salem, and a schooner, name and armament unknown. Landrail was on her way to join a convoy to Castine, Maine, then in British possession. The fight lasted some two hours though there is no report of casualties on Landrail. Reportedly, the American privateers did suffer a number of killed and wounded.

Anthony de Mayne succeeded Rochfort on 5 July 1815. On 6 August 1815, she lost her mast during a destructive gale that hit Bermuda. De Mayne was engaged in surveying with the Landrail during 1817.

== Fate ==
Landrail was paid off on 3 October 1818, and was sold. She was replaced by HMS Kangaroo, a survey brig purchased and commissioned in January 1819 in the West Indies.

== Postscript ==
Landrail’s flag went to the United States Naval Academy at Annapolis where it hangs with a number of other captured flags.

=== Coincidence ===
On 11 July 1896, almost exactly 92 years after the first Landrail's capture by Syren, the torpedo gunboat Landrail rammed and sank the clipper merchant ship Siren. Siren was a large four-masted vessel carrying a cargo of wool and tallow from Sydney to Britain. The accident occurred on a clear night, some thirty miles from Portland Bill. There were no lives lost on either vessel and Landrail herself suffered trifling damage. The owners of Siren put their loss at £86,529.
