= HMS Magpie (1806) =

History

United Kingdom
- Name: HMS Magpie
- Ordered: 11 December 1805
- Builder: William Rowe, St Peter's Yard, Newcastle
- Laid down: January 1806
- Launched: 17 May 1806
- Captured: 18 February 1807

France
- Name: Magpye or Magpie
- Acquired: 18 February 1807 by capture
- Commissioned: 16 May 1807
- Renamed: Colombe
- Fate: Broken up 1828

General characteristics
- Class & type: Cuckoo-class schooner
- Displacement: 95 tons (French)
- Tons burthen: 7569/94 (bm)
- Length: 56 ft 2 in (17.1 m) (overall); 42 ft 9 in (13.0 m) (keel)
- Beam: 18 ft 3 in (5.6 m)
- Draught: Unladen: 4 ft 3 in (1.3 m); Laden: 7 ft 10 in (2.4 m)
- Depth of hold: 8 ft 1 in (2.5 m)
- Sail plan: Schooner
- Complement: British service:20; French service:78
- Armament: British service: 4 × 12-pounder carronades; French service; Initially:6 × 4-pounder guns + 3 × 12-pounder carronades + 2 × 12-pounder obusiers (howitzers); 1808: 12 × 12-pounder carronades; 1823: 6 × 12-pounder carronades

HMS Magpie was a Royal Navy Cuckoo-class schooner that William Rowe of Newcastle built and launched on 17 May 1806. Like all her class, she was armed with four 12-pounder carronades and had a crew of 20. She had been in British service for less than a year when she grounded on the coast of France, which led to her capture. She then served in the French navy until 1828, including a few years as a prison ship.

== Capture ==
Lieutenant Edward Johnson commissioned her in 1806. Fleeing a storm she attempted to anchor near Les Sept Îsles on the coast of Brittany. This proved impossible and she took shelter in a bay near Perros. When Magpie anchored, she grounded. As French troops approached in boats she surrendered. The troops took her and her crew captive on 18 February 1807.

== French service ==
The French took her into service as Magpye and commissioned her at Brest under lieutenant de vaisseau Arnous-Dessaulsays, on 16 May 1807.

By 1809, she was carrying messages for Admiral Willaumez when on 21 February he attempted to escape Brest with a large French fleet. The British blockade squadron drove them to take shelter under the Île d'Aix. Lieutenant Arnous commanded Magpye for 38 months before removing to the corvette Echo. His biographer avers that during this time Magpye escorted convoys in the Channel and had numerous engagements with the British without, however, suffering any harm or casualties.

On 19 June 1811, Captain Proteau took command of the 17th coastal squadron at Brest with Magpye as his "flagship", while between June and December Magpie was under the command of Lieutenant de vaisseau Clémendot. On 17 August Proteau became commander of the 3rd squadron of the Imperial coastal flotilla at Boulogne, including the 17th squadron. He removed to the pram Ville-de-Rouen. The flotilla was laid up in March 1812.

On 26 July 1814 the French changed Magpye's name to Colombe. During the Hundred Days her name reverted to Magpye, only to revert to Colombe on 15 July 1815. She was paid off on 20 August but recommissioned 5 April 1816 for Senegal. By October 1816 she was listed as an 80-ton transport.

Around 1820 she participated at Brest in trials of three new types of rudder. In 1821 she may have been engaged in fisheries protection.

In 1823 she reverted to being a schooner. In December 1823 she sailed from Lorient to Rochefort under the command of enseigne de vaisseaux Dagorne, and arrived in January 1824. A French Parliamentary report from 1826 notes that she is mentioned in the national accounts for 1824 as being laid up at Rochefort with a two-man crew.

== Fate ==
In 1826 Colombe became a prison ship at Brest. She was broken up at Rochefort in August 1828.
