= Caledonia (1829 ship) =

History

United Kingdom
- Name: Caledonia
- Owner: 1829:Thomas Symers (Note: Thomas Symers had been second mate on Blenden Hall when she wrecked in 1821 in a notable shipwreck that left her passengers and crew marooned for some six months. His brother George was the surgeon on the ship.); 1841:M'Cutcheon; Thereafter: Various
- Builder: Thomas Symers, Coringa, East Godavari district
- Launched: 1829 (Note: One source gives a launch year of 1819, but may be conflating two vessels as Symers had an earlier vessel built at Coringa.)
- Fate: Last listed in 1855

General characteristics
- Type: Barque
- Tons burthen: 189 (bm)
- Propulsion: Sail

Caledonia was a merchant ship built in British India in 1829. She traded between India, China, Mauritius, and the Australian Colonies. She played an important role in the development of King George Sound (Western Australia). She made two voyages transporting convicts, one voyage from Madras and the other from Swan River Colony, both to Sydney, Australia. After her sale in 1840 her registry shifted to London and she became a general trader. She was last listed in 1855.

== Career ==
Thomas Lyell Smyers was Caledonia's builder, owner, and most frequent master.

On 1 May 1838 Smyers and Caledonia sailed from Point de Galle with 139 labourers for the government at Mauritius.

Captain Symers transported passengers, cargo, and eighteen convicts from Madras and arrived at Sydney on 16 December 1838.

Caledonia left Canton in July 1839 with a cargo of 2000 chests of tea. A storm on 21 September caused her to drift ashore on 22 September at Fremantle. She was got off after discharging her cargo. The grounding caused extensive damage, including breaking 32 feet of keel. Smyers had her repaired at a cost of £920. She then left on 3 January 1840. On this voyage she also transported one convict from the Swan River Colony, via Adelaide (16 April) and Port Phillip (23 April), arriving on 30 April 1840. She left Sydney for London afterwards.

In 1840 Symers ran into financial difficulties and sold Caledonia. She appears in the supplemental pages of Lloyd's Register for 1841 with M'Cutcheon as master and owner, and with home port of London.

Year	Master	Owner	Trade	Notes
1845	Cass	Tegg	London–China	Large repairs in 1844
1850	G. Murray	LeBretagne & Co.	London–Bahia	Large repairs in 1848, and damages repaired in 1849
1855	Le Riche	LeBretagne & Co.		Last listing
