= HMS Rook =

History

United Kingdom
- Name: HMS Rook
- Ordered: 11 December 1805
- Builder: Thomas Sutton, Ringmore, Devon
- Laid down: February 1806
- Launched: 21 May 1806
- Commissioned: July 1806
- Honours and awards: Battle of Copenhagen (1807)
- Captured: 18 August 1808
- Fate: Burnt by her French captors, 18 August 1808

General characteristics
- Class & type: Cuckoo-class schooner
- Tons burthen: 75 35/94 (bm)
- Length: 56 ft 3 in (17.1 m) (gundeck); 42 ft 4 1/4 in (12.9 m) (keel)
- Beam: 18 ft 3 1/2 in (5.6 m)
- Draught: Unladen: 4 ft 4 in (1.3 m); Laden: 7 ft 6 in (2.3 m)
- Depth of hold: 8 ft 6 1/2 in (2.6 m)
- Sail plan: Full-rigged ship, Schooner
- Complement: 20 officers and men
- Armament: 4 × 12-pounder carronades

HMS Rook was a Royal Navy Cuckoo-class schooner, that Thomas Sutton built at Ringmore (Teignmouth) and launched in 1806. In 1808 two French privateers captured and burnt her as she was on her way back to Britain from Port-Royal, Jamaica

== Service ==
She was commissioned by Lieutenant Joseph Griffiths for the North Sea. With Rook he was present at the surrender of the Danish Fleet after the Battle of Copenhagen (1807) on 7 September. (Note: The prize money amounted to £3 8s for an ordinary seaman, or just slightly over two months wages.) Rook also received a share, with many other ships in the British fleet at Copenhagen in August–September 1807, of the prize money for the capture of Odifiord and Benedicta (4 and 12 September).

In 1808 Lieutenant James Lawrence took command of Rook. On 28 June, under orders from Admiral Young, she set sail from Plymouth in England to the West Indies. After refitting and taking on specie, on 13 August she left Port-Royal (Jamaica) for Britain with despatches. A French schooner shadowed her for two days, but Rook somehow evaded the hostile French ship.

On 18 August Rook, still on her way to Britain with despatches, had the misfortune (having dodged one threat) to meet with two French privateers off Cape St. Nicholas (San Domingo). The larger French schooner carried 12 guns and the smaller schooner 10 guns. An unusually accurate shot by Lieutenant Lawrence killed the captain of the largest privateer. After an hour-and-a-half hard fighting, the two privateers succeeded in taking Rook by boarding her. In all, she had three crew members killed, including Lawrence, killed by a musket shot, and 11 wounded (including the Master's Mate - the second in command). The French stripped the survivors naked, including the wounded, and put them into a boat. Before doing so, they kicked Lawrence's body, stabbed to death a wounded sergeant of the Royal Artillery, and threw some wounded overboard. Fortunately, the four unwounded men were able to bring the boat to land where they encountered hospitable natives.

== Fate ==
The French intended to take Rook into port as a prize. However, the engagement had caused so much damage to her the French instead decided to set her on fire. They then sailed away as she burned and sank.

== Postscript ==
In 1810 James Auchie & Co., London, sued their insurers for six cases of specie, each containing $2000, carried in Rook and consigned to the company. However, as Lawrence had signed the Bill of Lading "contents unknown" and as there was no other evidence beyond some notations in the margin of the bill, the judge dismissed the suit.
