= Cuckoo-class schooner =

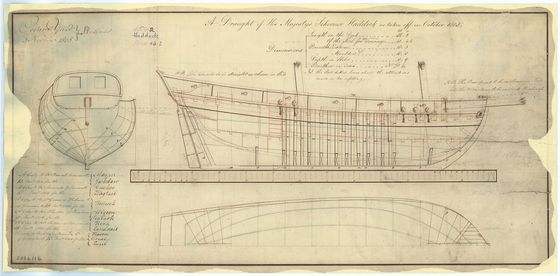
- A plan showing body plan with stern board outline, sheer lines with inboard detail, and longitudinal half-breadth of HMS Haddock, as taken off in October 1805 and modified on her refit. This plan was used for the subsequent Cuckoo-class schooners. National Maritime Museum, Greenwich

Class overview
- Name: Cuckoo (or Bird) class
- Operators: Royal Navy
- Preceded by: Ballahoo (or Fish) class
- Succeeded by: Cheerful class
- Planned: 12
- Completed: 12
- Lost: 9
- Retired: 3

General characteristics
- Tons burthen: 75 1/94 (bm)
- Length: Overall:56 ft 2 in (17.12 m); Keel:42 ft 4 1/8 in (12.906 m)
- Beam: 18 ft 3 in (5.56 m)
- Depth of hold: 8 ft 6 in (2.59 m)
- Sail plan: Schooner
- Complement: 20
- Armament: 4 × 12-pounder carronades (pierced for 10)

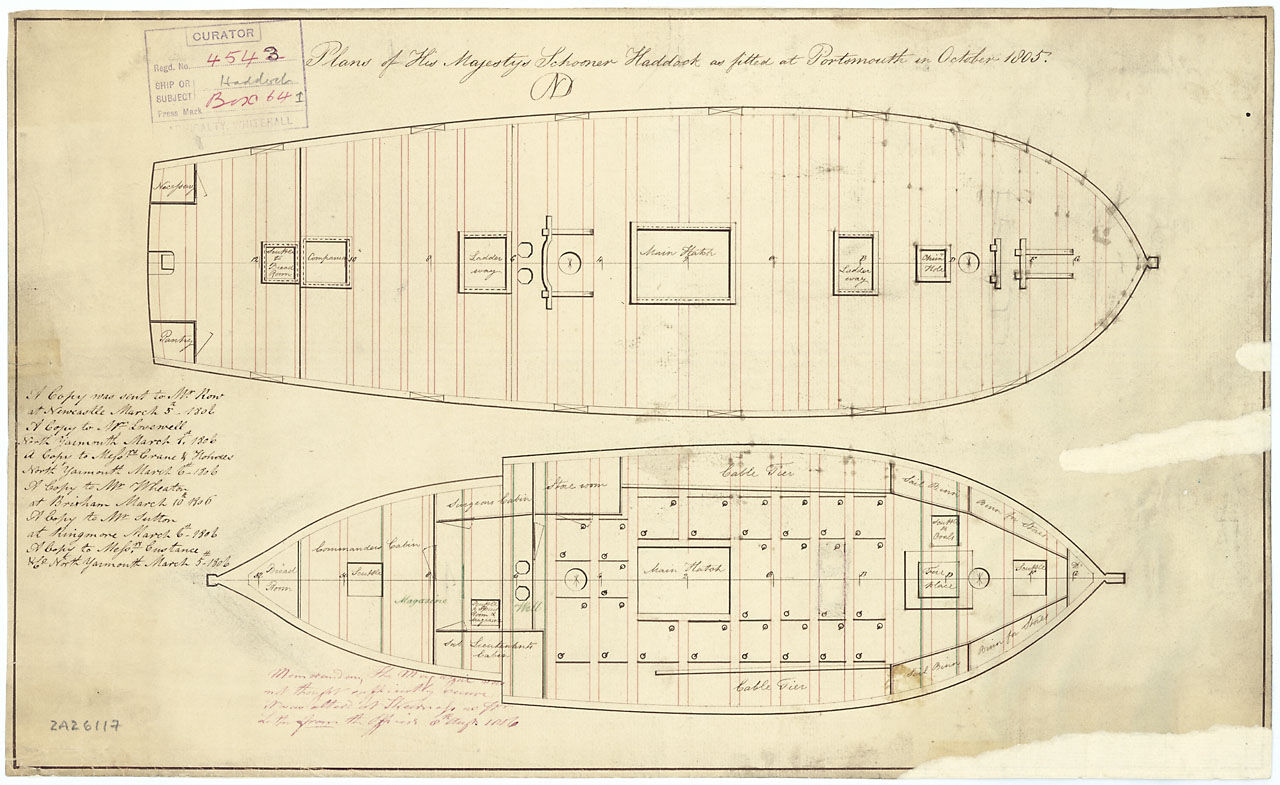
Plan of HMS Haddock, c. October 1805

The Cuckoo class was a class of twelve 4-gun schooners of the Royal Navy, built by contract in English shipyards during the Napoleonic War. They followed the design of the Bermuda-designed and built Ballahoo-class schooners, and more particularly, that of Haddock. The Admiralty ordered all twelve vessels on 11 December 1805. A number of different builders in different yards built them, with all launching in 1806.

== Operational lives ==
Nine of the twelve vessels were lost or disposed of during the war, the survivors being sold in 1816. Enemy forces took four, of which the British were able to retake two. Seven wrecked or foundered with a loss of about 22 crew members in all.

William James wrote scathingly of the Cuckoo and Ballahoo-class schooners, pointing out the high rate of loss, primarily to wrecking or foundering, but also to enemy action. He reports that they were "sent to 'take, burn, and destroy' the vessels of war and merchantmen of the enemy". The record suggests that none seem to have done so successfully. In the only two (arguably three) cases when they did engage enemy vessels, in each case the enemy force was much stronger and the Cuckoo-class vessels were overwhelmed.

James also remarks that:

Their very appearance as "men of war" raised a laugh at the expense of the projector. Many officers refused to take the command of them. Others gave a decided preference to some vessels built at the same yard, to be employed as water-tanks at Jamaica. Moreover, when sent forth to cruise against the enemies of England...these "king's schooners" were found to sail wretchedly, and proved so crank and unseaworthy, that almost every one of them that escaped capture went to the bottom with the unfortunate men on board.

== Ships ==
Name	Builder	Begun	Launched	Completed	Fate
Cuckoo	James Lovewell, Gt. Yarmouth	January 1806	12 April 1806	21 August 1806 at Chatham Dockyard	Wrecked on the Haak Sands at the mouth of the Texel on 4 April 1810 with the loss of two crew members.
Magpie	William Rowe, Newcastle	January 1806	17 May 1806	12 August 1806 at Chatham Dockyard	Taken on 18 February 1807 by French troops after grounding in a storm off Perros, Brittany. As Colombe she served with the French Navy until possibly as late as 1828.
Jackdaw	William Rowe, Newcastle	January 1806	19 May 1806	8 July 1806 at Chatham Dockyard	Taken and retaken 1807; Sold at Plymouth on 1 November 1816 for £210.
Landrail	Thomas Sutton, Ringmore	January 1806	18 June 1806	16 July 1806 at Plymouth Dockyard	Taken and retaken 1814; paid off October 1816 and sold c. 1818.
Woodcock	Crane & Holmes, Gt. Yarmouth	February 1806	11 April 1806	23 July 1806 at Chatham Dockyard	Wrecked 13 February 1807 at Vila Franca do Campo, São Miguel in the Azores
Wagtail	James Lovewell, Gt. Yarmouth	February 1806	12 April 1806	126 July 1806 at Chatham Dockyard	Wrecked 13 February 1807 at Vila Franca do Campo, São Miguel in the Azores, three hours after Woodcock; one crew member drowned.
Crane	Custance & Stone, Gt. Yarmouth	February 1806	26 April 1806	8 July 1806 at Chatham Dockyard	Wrecked off Plymouth Hoe on 26 October 1808.
Quail	Custance & Stone, Gt. Yarmouth	February 1806	26 April 1806	3 July 1806 at Chatham Dockyard	Sold at Plymouth on 11 January 1816 for £260 after what was apparently a completely uneventful career.
Pigeon	Custance & Stone, Gt. Yarmouth	February 1806	26 April 1806	8 July 1806 at Chatham Dockyard	Wrecked off Margate on 15 January 1809; two crew members died of exposure.
Rook	Thomas Sutton, Ringmore	February 1806	21 May 1806	28 June 1806 at Plymouth Dockyard	Captured and burnt by two French privateers off Cape St. Nicholas (San Domingo) on 18 August 1808; three crew members killed (including her captain), and 11 wounded.
Widgeon	William Wheaton, Brixham	March 1806	19 June 1806	24 May 1807 at Plymouth Dockyard	Wrecked off Banff on 20 April 1808.
Sealark	William Wheaton, Brixham	March 1806	1 August 1806	25 May 1807 at Plymouth Dockyard	Foundered in the North Sea on 18 June 1809; only one crew member survived.
