= Blenden Hall =

British ship

History

United Kingdom
- Name: Blenden Hall
- Namesake: Blendon Hall
- Owner: 1811: Swan; 1812: Anderson; 1813: Sheddens; 1814: Anthony Greig
- Builder: John Tyson & Richard F. S. Blake, Bursledon, Hampshire
- Launched: 20 July 1811
- Fate: Wrecked 1821

General characteristics
- Tons burthen: 450, 472, or 47335/94, or 475 (bm)
- Length: 123 ft 9 in (37.7 m)
- Beam: 29 ft 1 in (8.9 m)
- Draught: 18 ft 0 in (5.5 m) (laden)
- Sail plan: full-rigged
- Complement: 24
- Armament: 2 × 9-pounder guns + 14 × 12-pounder carronades

Blenden Hall (sometimes Blendon Hall) was a full-rigged ship, launched in 1811 at Bursledon, Hampshire, England. (Note: Lloyd's Registers 1811-1815 list the ship as built at "Brlntn", supposed to be an abbreviation of Bridlington, but corrects this in 1816 to "Shmtn", Southampton, which is near to Bursledon.) A French frigate captured her in 1813, but then abandoned her. After her recovery she returned to trade. She was wrecked in 1821 on Inaccessible Island in a notable incident.

== Career ==
Blenden Hall first appears in Lloyd's Register in 1811 showing owner as Swan & Co and J. Farrier, master, with ownership changing by 1812 to Anderson & Co. In 1813 her master changed from Farrier to J. Barr, and her owner from Andersen to Sheddens.

On 27 November 1813 Blenden Hall, bound for Bermuda with naval stores, and four other merchant vessels, left Portsmouth in a convoy under escort by HMS Severn. Due to a heavy storm, the five merchantmen lost contact with the convoy and its escort. On 5 December the French frigate Clorinde captured all five merchant vessels, in the Atlantic Ocean (44°30′N 10°30′W).

The French took off the crews of four vessels and scuttled three. They kept Lusitania as a cartel and put all their captives aboard her. In their haste, they failed to sink Blenden Hall. They then permitted Lusitania to sail to a British port.

On 12 December the Falmouth packet Eliza, homebound to England from Malta, found Blenden Hall drifting. (Note: Eliza was an American-built brig of 166 tons (bm), launched in 1804. Her master was Stevens and her owner Slade. She was armed with fourteen 6 and 9-pounder guns.) Eliza put a 10-man prize crew aboard and both set off for Falmouth. Bad weather intervened and the two separated. On 16 December Challenger came on the scene and under a dubious pretext put her own prize crew aboard Blenden Hall as well. On 18 December Challenger brought Blenden Hall into Plymouth. There, Blenden Hall was reunited with her crew, which had arrived that same day. Challenger sued for salvage on Blenden Hall, but the Admiralty Court pointed out that Eliza's crew had not required Challenger's help and dismissed the case.

Barr resumed his voyage. On 1 March she was off St Michael's in company with Venelia, Parget, master, and a convoy under the escort of HMS Bulwark. Blenden Hall arrived at Jamaica on 8 June 1814 from London and Bermuda.

In 1814 Captain Anthony Greig purchased Blenden Hall. At that time she received a license from the British East India Company to sail east of the Cape of Good Hope.

== Loss ==
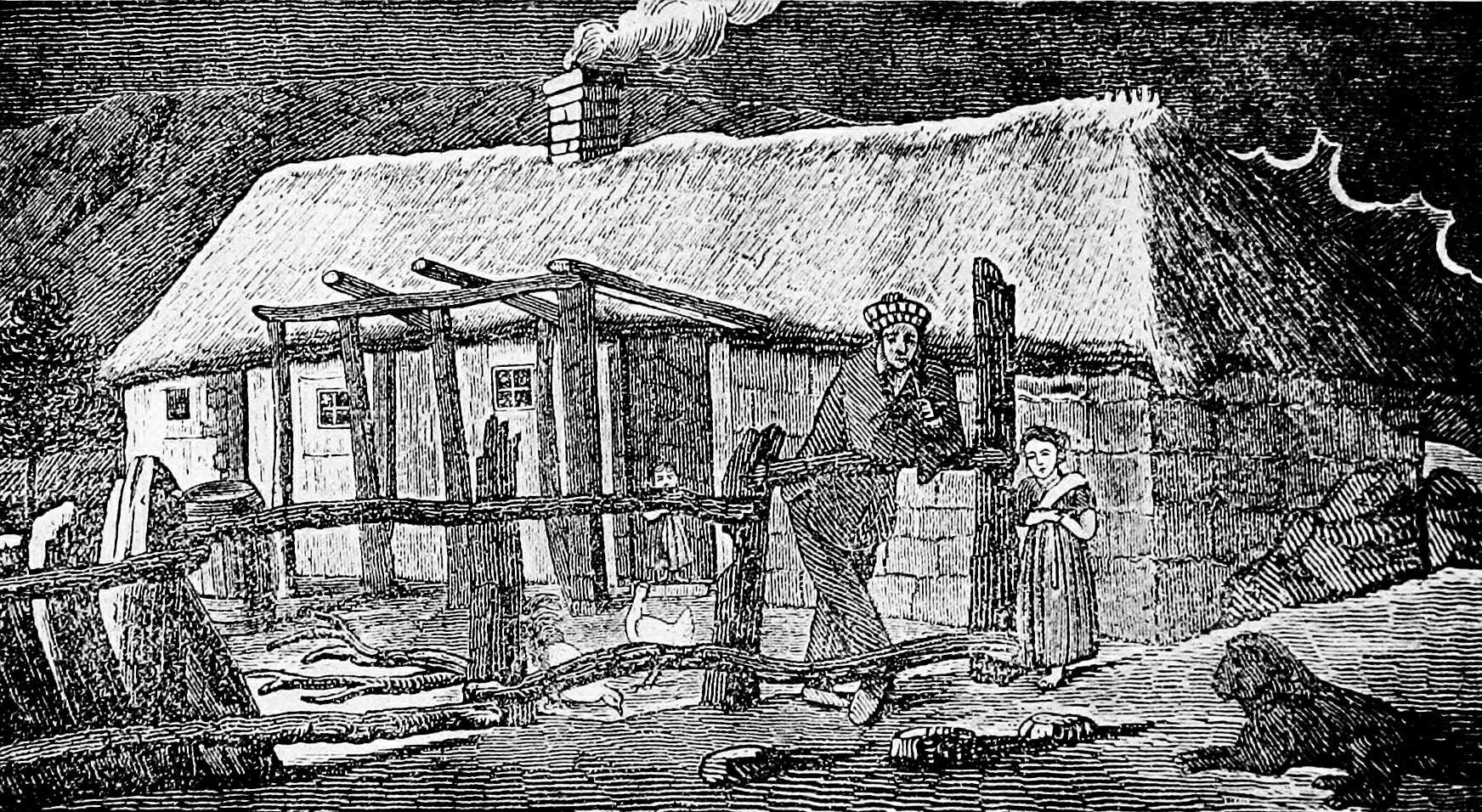
The cottage on Tristan da Cunha where the survivors took refuge

On 18 May 1821 Greig sailed Blenden Hall for Bombay; she left at the same time as Ogle Castle, which arrived there on 5 October.

On the way Blendan Hall encountered the merchant ship Daphne, which was on her way to Madras. The weather being dead calm, Greig spent a day on Daphne and had a "Most excellent dinner".

Blendan Hall was reported to have been at Cape Verde on 8 June, but by 1 December she had not arrived at Bombay and there had been no further word of her. The reason for the lack of news was that on 22 July the weather was foggy and Blenden Hall had drifted on to the rocks at Inaccessible Island in the South Atlantic. Two seamen drowned trying to swim to shore. However all the passengers and the rest of the crew reached shore safely. Once there, they were marooned for four months. They subsisted on celery, penguins, albatrosses, birds' eggs, and seal meat. On 19 October six men sailed for Tristan da Cunha on a boat or raft that the survivors had constructed; this party was never heard from again. The survivors constructed a second boat that with three men aboard reached Tristan da Cunha on 8 November. Two boats set out from the island and rescued the remainder of the survivors.

After two more months the British snow Nerina called at Tristan da Cunha. (Note: Nerina was a snow of 206 tons (bm), launched at Sunderland in 1813. Her master was Laucchlan (or Lackland, or Lachlan), and her owner was Dixon & Co.) On 8 January 1822 she left the island with the survivors (a sailor and a woman servant stayed behind); she landed them at Cape Town on 20 January.

== Post script ==
Blenden Hall's second mate was Thomas Lyell Smyers, and her surgeon was his brother George. Thomas Smyers became a merchant in Albany, Western Australia, and owner and master of Caledonia.
