= HMS Coquette (1807) =

Sloop of the Royal Navy

History

United Kingdom
- Name: HMS Queen Mab
- Ordered: 4 October 1805
- Builder: Temple shipbuilders, North Shields (Note: Lloyd's Register, the Register of Shipping, and records based on them, give Coquette's launch place as The King's Yard, Deptford. The naval dockyard at Deptford was the place of purchase when the Navy sold Coquette.)
- Laid down: February 1806
- Launched: 25 April 1807
- Renamed: HMS Coquette (6 June 1807)
- Fate: Sold 1817 into mercantile service

United Kingdom
- Name: Coquette (or Coquet)
- Owner: 1817: Raines; 1820:Gains & Co.; 1823:Gale & Son; 1827:Deacon & Co.
- Acquired: 1817 by purchase
- Fate: Lost

General characteristics
- Class & type: Cormorant class ship-sloop; reclassed 1811 as Post ship
- Type: Quarterdeck ship-sloop
- Tons burthen: 48410/94, or 495 bm
- Length: 113 ft 3 1/2 in (34.531 m) (overall); 94 ft 2 3/8 in (28.7 m) (keel)
- Beam: 31 ft 1 in (9.47 m)
- Draught: Unladen: 7 ft 3 in (2.21 m); Laden: 10 ft 6 in (3.20 m)
- Depth of hold: 9 ft 5 in (2.87 m)
- Propulsion: Sails
- Complement: 121
- Armament: Upper Deck: 18 × 32-pounder carronades; QD: 6 × 12-pounder carronades; Fc: 2 × 6-pounder guns + 2 × 12-pounder carronades; Centreline: 1 × 12-pounder gun

HMS Coquette was launched in 1807 and spent her naval career patrolling in the Channel and escorting convoys. In 1813 she engaged an American privateer in a notable but inconclusive single-ship action. The Navy put Coquette in ordinary in 1814 and sold her in 1817. She became a whaler and made five whaling voyages to the British southern whale fishery before she was lost in 1835 on her sixth.

== Talbot class ==
Coquette was the second ship in a class of two sloops; her sister ship was HMS Talbot, the name ship for the class. Both were enlarged versions of the Cormorant-class ship-sloop. In 1811 the Admiralty re-rated Talbot and Coquette as 20-gun post ships.

== Royal Navy service ==
Commander Robert Forbes commissioned Coquette for the Channel in June 1807. An announcement of his appointment to Coquette described her as "the fins and largest sloop in the British Navy".

On 19 November 1807, Coquette recovered the English brig Amazon, which was carrying a cargo of hemp. Amazon, Birkley, master, had been sailing from Petersburg to Plymouth when two French privateers captured her off the Isle of Wight. Coquette recaptured Amazon and sent her into Portsmouth, where Amazon arrived on 2 December. (Note: Amazon, of 186 tons burthen, had been launched in 1801 at Howdon. The prize money accruing to a seaman on Coquette was £2 10s.)

On 26 October 1807, Tsar Alexander I of Russia declared war on Great Britain. The official news did not arrive there until 2 December, at which time the British declared an embargo on all Russian vessels in British ports. Coquette was one of some 70 vessels that shared in the proceeds of the seizure of the 44-gun Russian frigate Speshnoy (Speshnyy), and the Russian storeship Wilhelmina (or Vilghemina) then in Portsmouth harbour. The Russian vessels were carrying the payroll for Vice-Admiral Dmitry Senyavin’s squadron in the Mediterranean. (Note: Consequently, a seaman on any one of the 70 British vessels received 14s 7½d in prize money.)

On 23 October 1808, Coquette was in company with Daring when they captured the French privateer Espiegle.

Forbes was promoted to post captain on 21 October 1810, the fifth anniversary of the battle of Trafalgar. Commander George Hewson replaced Forbes in November.

On 12 July a vessel arrived at Leith that Coquette had detained as the vessel was sailing from Archangel.

On 16 November HMS Chanticleer took possession of the derelict vessel Haabet near the Dogger Bank. Haabet, of near 800 tons burthen, Jannsen, master, had lost her main and mizzen mast and was waterlogged. Her crew had abandoned her. She had been bringing timber from Memel. Two days later Coquette took Haabet into Leith, arriving on 21 November.

Between January and May 1812 Coquette was undergoing fitting at Woolwich. In March Captain Thomas Bradby assumed command. In May, Captain John Simpson replaced Bradby.

When news of the outbreak of the War of 1812 reached Britain, the Royal Navy seized all American vessels then in British ports. Coquette was among the Royal Navy vessels then lying at Spithead or Portsmouth and so entitled to share in the grant for the American ships Belleville, Janus, Aeos, Ganges and Leonidas seized there on 31 July 1812. (Note: An ordinary seaman received 4s 1d; the Commander in Chief received £230 10s 8d.)

On 20 November Coquette sailed from Portsmouth with a convoy bound for the West Indies.

On 11 March 1813 Coquette was a little to windward of Suriname. At 6 o'clock in the morning she encountered a schooner. Simpson lured the schooner closer by sailing like a merchantman. The schooner opened fire at 9a.m. with a 32-pounder gun that outranged Coquette's guns. Coquette was finally able to engage at about 10:30a.m. She discovered that the schooner, which flew an American flag, was armed with 14 guns, plus the 32-pounder, and had a crew of over 100 men. In the engagement the vessels exchanged broadsides and both sustained damage. It appeared that the American might strike her flag, but instead she took to her sweeps and escaped as the wind was too weak for Coquette to pursue. Coquette had four men wounded, two of whom later died.

The American privateer was General Armstrong. Her captain later reported that she had suffered six men killed and 16 wounded in the engagement.

Lloyd's List reported on 21 May 1813 that General Armstrong's long gun was a 42-pounder, and that she had a crew of 140 men. It also reported, incorrectly, that her captain (Guy R. Champlin), had been killed.

On 20 July, Coquette was in company with Cressy, Frolic, and Mercury at the capture of the American ship Fame.

Disposal: The Navy placed Coquette in Ordinary at Woolwich in 1814. The "Principal Officers and Commissioners of His Majesty's Navy" offered the "Coquette sloop, of 484 tons", lying at Deptford, for sale on 30 January 1817. She finally sold for £1,090 on 30 April to a Mr. Ismay.

== Mercantile service ==
Coquette became a whaler, sailing for a sequence of owners. Coquet first appeared in Lloyd's Register and the Register of Shipping in 1818 with J. (or T.) Moore, master, Rains, owner, and trade London–South Seas. (Note: Neither register has an online volume for 1817.)

1st whaling voyage (1817–1818): Captain Joseph Moore sailed in 1817. Coquette returned on 7 November 1819 with 600 casks of whale oil.

2nd whaling voyage (1820–1823): Captain King sailed on 9 June 1820, bound for Peru. On 22 January 1821 Coquette and Globe, of Nantucket, spoke in the Eastern Pacific. Captain Phillips of Coquette reported that Captain King had taken ill and returned to London. Phillips, the chief mate, had assumed command.

On 14 August 1821 10 of the 12 men in a landing party from Coquette were massacred at Hanamenu on the island of Hiva Oa in the Marquesas Islands. They had the misfortune to arrive as a local war commenced and one side assumed they were enemy. HMS Dauntless was sent to investigate and exact reprisals.

Between 9 and 30 October 1822 Coquette was at Honolulu after having fished off the coast of Japan. She returned to England on 18 April 1823 with 600 casks of whale oil.

3rd whaling voyage (1823–1826): Captain John Stavers sailed from England on 2 November 1823. (Note: He had previously been master of the whaler Sir George Osborne.) Coquette was at the Moluccas on 29 March 1824, on the coast of Japan in June–July, and at Timor in September.

While Coquette was at Guam in 1825 Stavers entered into a dispute with the Spanish governor there. The governor did not acknowledge Stavers's invitation to fight, but in the evening a party of the governor's guards lured Stavers into an ambush and murdered him. Some accounts state that the Governor executed Stavers for "drunken riotous behavior". Captain Spencer replaced Stavers.

Coquette returned to England on 1 September 1826 with 550 casks or 2600 barrels.

Lloyd's Register for 1827 showed Coquette as having undergone repairs in 1827, and her master changing from Buckle to Thornton. It also showed her owner as Deacon & Co. The Register of Shipping for 1827 showed Coquette's master changing from Phillips to Thornton, and her owner still as Gale & Co.

4th whaling voyage (1827–1829): Captain Thornton sailed from England on 31 August 1827. By 9 September Coquette was at Madeira. She returned to England on 19 October 1829.

A suit by the ship's cooper on her return reveals that her owners for the voyage were Bicknell, Deacon (managing owner), and Thorton (also the commander). The voyage had proved particularly valuable and the plaintiff's 1/90th share was £141 14s 8d. Advances and deductions reduced the net to £37 16s 7d.

5th whaling voyage (1830–1832): Captain Thornton sailed on 20 April 1830, bound for the Indian Ocean. On 3 July 1832 Coquette was at Mauritius, sailing for London. She returned to London on 10 October 1832.

== Loss ==
Captain Thornton sailed Coquette from London on 12 December 1832 on her 6th whaling voyage, bound for the Pacific Ocean. On 16 January 1834 she was at New Ireland. In February she was at Bayenwall Island (near the Isle de Santa Cruz). The Sydney Herald reported on 28 July 1834 that natives of one of the islands of New Guinea had speared a boat's crew belonging to Coquette, 12 months out of London.

Lloyd's List reported on 13 June 1837 that Coquette had not been heard of since July 1835, when another whaler had spoken to her off the coast of Japan. At the time, Coquette had 1700 barrels of whale oil. Another report had Coquette lost at Guam on 4 November 1835. The fate of the vessel was still unknown in 1846 when the family of one of the crewmen sought news of his fate.
