= Hired armed cutter Idas =

During the period of the Napoleonic Wars, two vessels have served the British Royal Navy as His Majesty's Hired armed cutter Idas, named for Idas, a figure from Greek mythology.

== The first Idas ==
The first Idas was a cutter that served the Royal Navy from 10 November 1808 to 5 September 1812. She carried ten 6-pounder guns and was of 142 tons (bm).

In August–December 1809, Idas participated in the ill-fated Walcheren Campaign while under the command of Lieutenant James Duncan. She helped cover the initial British landing and then carried dispatches from Rear-admiral Sir Richard Strachan back to England, arriving there on 6 August. Idas spent much of the expedition carrying dispatches or Admiral Strachan from one location to another. Still, on 1 December, Idas was in company with the hired armed lugger Speculator, when they recaptured Respect.

On 16 March 1810, boats from Idas and the hired armed cutter King George brought out a French privateer schuyt, of four guns, from the Texel. They did so despite strong small arms fire from the shore.

In January 1811, the galiot Gabriel, a prize to Idas, was driven on shore near Yarmouth.

However, in November 1812 the Custom-house officers of Arundel seized Idas while she was at anchor in the Downs and took her into Little Hampton harbour for having carried on an illicit trade.

=== Letters of marque ===
This Idas may have served as a privateer under a Letter of Marque both before and after her service with the Royal Navy.

- On 24 December 1807, an Idas, cutter under the command of John May, of 141 (or 14135/94) tons burthen and fourteen 6-pounder guns, received a letter of marque.
- On 12 January 1814, an Idas, cutter under the command of Thomas Newton, of 141 tons burthen and sixteen 9 and 6-pounder guns, received a letter of marque. On 25 February 1814, Idas, privateer of Hastings, captured Commodore Perry, which had been sailing from Philadelphia to Bordeaux. Idas brought her into the Downs on 2 March.

== The second Idas ==
Idas
History

United Kingdom
- Name: Idas
- Launched: 1808
- Acquired: 21 April 1809 by contract
- Captured: 4 June 1810

France
- Name: Idas
- Acquired: 4 June 1810 by capture
- Fate: Disposed of ca. March 1815

General characteristics
- Displacement: 180 tons (French)
- Tons burthen: 10218/94 (bm)
- Length: 19.06 m (62.5 ft)
- Beam: 6.40 m (21.0 ft)
- Armament: British service: 10 guns; French service: 12 × 9-pounder guns

The second Idas was a cutter of 10 guns and 10218/94 tons (bm) that served the Royal Navy from 21 April 1809 until she grounded and was captured on 4 June 1810. The French Navy refloated her and took her into service. She served until ca. 1815.

British service: Lieutenant William Wells is the first officer on record as having commanded Idas. Initially she participated in the Gunboat War. On 19 June 1809 she captured the Danish brig Haabet. At the time the hired armed ship Prince William was in sight. (Note: A second-class share of the prize money was worth £19 12s 4 1/2d; a sixth-class share, that of an ordinary seaman, was worth 16s.) That same day Idas captured the Danish vessels Fortuna and Joannes. Idas shared the proceeds of the capture on 4 July of Gunild Cecilia and Fortuna with Defense. (Note: A first-class share was worth £49 2s 5 1/2p; a sixth-class share was worth 3s 11 1/4d.) On 25 July she captured the privateer Haberbaden and then on 14 August the privateer Flora, of six guns and 30 men. Flora was nine miles from The Skaw at the time. She had been six weeks out of Copenhagen and had taken only one prize, a Danish sloop, that Idas recaptured. Flora had recaptured the sloop after HMS Allart had captured her. (Note: For Haberbaden and Flora, Wells received £44 9s 3 1/2d in prize money; an ordinary seaman received £3 1s 6 3/4d.)

Then on 14 August Idas recaptured the Danish ship Laurentius and Maria. Next, on 6 September she captured Margaretha Dorothea while in company with the gun-brig Urgent. (Note: A first class share of the prize money was worth £15 10s 6d; a sixth-class share was worth £1 5 1/4d.) Two weeks later, on 20 September, Idas captured Margaretha and Tra Broders.

On 7 October Idas captured the Danish sloops No. 59, Cecilia Maria, and Bonus. On 7 November she captured the Danish sloop Four Sisters while in company with the hired armed cutter Hero. (Note: In 1811 the Danes would badly damage Hero and sink the hired armed cutter Swan while the two were operating together near Uddevalla.) Two days later, on 9 November, Idas captured the Danish brig Resolution. A partial disbursement of the prize money for Resolution amounted to £1400. (Note: For Resolution, Margaretha Dorothea, and Three Brothers (Tra Broder), Wells received second-class shares amounting to £106 15s 2d, over £80 of which was for Resolution; for an ordinary seaman, the sum was £8 5s 4 1/2d, more than £6 of which was for Resolution. A second disbursement for the Three Brothers yielded Wells £41 4s 10d; an ordinary seaman received 18s 3 3/4d. The announcement also mentioned that Childers had been in company and would share in the prize money.)

On 4 June 1810, while under the command of Lieutenant J. Rayson, Idas grounded on the end of Ellebourge Sand at the entrance on the Scheldt where the French captured her.

The schooner Porgey came to her rescue while under enemy fire, but also grounded and was burnt to avoid capture. A party from Drake arrived with orders either to free Idas, or burn her if necessary to prevent the French from taking possession. The officer commanding the party, Lieutenant Langley was not in uniform, and though he was two years Rayson's junior, Rayson mistook him for Drake's captain. Langley ordered Rayson to leave with his crew, which Rayson did, understanding that Langley would blow up Idas. Langley left with his men on the last boat, not having set fire to Idas but instead intending to return after he had delivered his men back to Drake. Langley was, however, unable to return due to the swiftness of the currents and fire from the shore. Consequently, the French were able to capture Idas. The court martial for the loss of the Idas reprimanded Langley for his actions.

French service: The French Navy refloated Idas on the next day and commissioned her under her existing name. The French ceded her to the Netherlands at Antwerp in August 1814. She was declared unserviceable in March 1815.
