= Margaret Drummond =

Margaret Drummond may refer to:

- Margaret Drummond, Queen of Scotland (1340–1375), queen of King David II of Scotland
- Margaret Drummond (mistress) (died 1501), mistress of James IV of Scotland
- Margaret Drummond (WRNS officer) (1917–1987), British Royal Navy officer
