= Jean Davies =

British naval officer (1909–1996)

Commandant Dame Jean Davies DBE
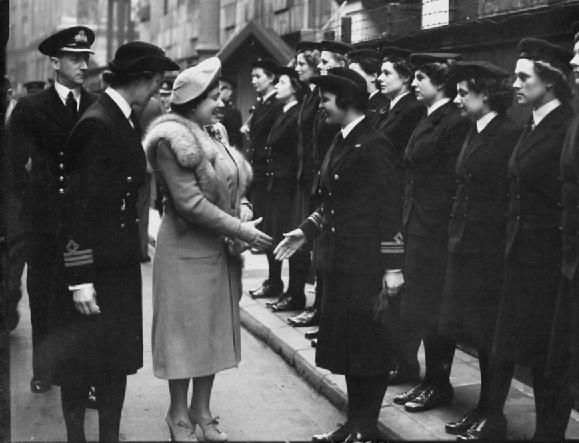
- First Officer Jean Davies (4th from left) meeting Queen Elizabeth in 1945
- Born: Jean Davies; 11 August 1909; Waterloo, Liverpool, Lancashire (now Waterloo, Merseyside), England
- Died: 29 August 1996 (aged 87); Warren Park Nursing Home, Blundellsands, Merseyside, England
- Spouse: Roy Cavander Lancaster (m. 1967–1981) (his death)
- Military career
- Allegiance: United Kingdom
- Branch: Women's Royal Naval Service
- Service years: 1939–1964
- Rank: Commandant
- Commands: Women's Royal Naval Service (1961–1964)
- Conflicts: Second World War
- Awards: Dame Commander of the Order of the British Empire

Commandant Dame Jean Lancaster, DBE (née Davies; 11 August 1909 – 29 August 1996) was a senior British naval officer who served as Director of the Women's Royal Naval Service (WRNS) from 1961 to 1964.

== Early life ==
Jean Davies was born on 11 August 1909 to Elizabeth (Hutton) and Richard Cameron Davies. She was educated at Merchant Taylors' Girls' School, an all-girls selective private school in Great Crosby, Lancashire (now Merseyside). After leaving school, Davies worked as a secretary to the headmaster of Merchant Taylors' Boys' School in Crosby.

== Naval career ==
=== Second World War ===
In December 1939, with the Second World War having broken out, Davies joined the Women's Royal Naval Service (WRNS). In May 1940, she was granted the rank of third officer (equivalent to sub-lieutenant) with seniority from 6 December 1939.

From 1940 to 1942, Davies was a member of the staff of Flag Officer Liverpool; her tasked included encoding and decoding messages concerning the Royal Navy's fight against the German U-boats. In February 1941, she was promoted to second officer (equivalent to lieutenant) with seniority from 2 December 1940.

In 1942, Davies was selected for signals officer training; this was usually reserved for men and she was one of the first six WRNS officers to qualify. She then worked at the headquarters of the Commander-in-Chief, Western Approaches in Liverpool. In August 1943, Davies was selected to be part of the delegation accompanying Winston Churchill, the then British Prime Minister, to the Quebec Conference. She worked in the cypher room aboard the ocean liner RMS Queen Mary during the voyage to Canada. After the conference, she was posted to Washington D.C., where she undertook signal work for the British Embassy; the results of the conference had overloaded the permanent staff there.

She returned to the United Kingdom with the rest of the British delegation aboard HMS Renown; unusually for a woman, she was "actually established as a member of the ship's company" during the voyage.

Davies was made an acting first officer (equivalent to lieutenant commander) in November 1943, with seniority from 26 October. She was then part of the Churchill's entourage to the Cairo Conference (22–26 November) and the Tehran Conference (28 November – 1 December). Churchill's 69th birthday occurred during the latter conference, and she attended his birthday party which was held at the British Embassy in Tehran. It was also attended by U.S. President Franklin D. Roosevelt and Soviet Marshal Josef Stalin.

Davies then returned to the headquarters of the Commander-in-Chief, Western Approaches, where she worked until the end of the war. In May 1944, her promotion to first officer was confirmed and she was granted seniority in that rank from 26 October 1943. Davies was appointed a Member of the Order of the British Empire in the 1944 King's Birthday Honours.

=== Later career ===
After the end of the Second World War, Davies remained in the military but transferred to the Administrative Branch. She then worked in a number of staff posts and also in personnel management. In 1958, she was advanced to Officer of the Order of the British Empire, promoted to superintendent (equivalent to captain) and appointed commanding officer of the WRNS personnel serving in the Fleet Air Arm.

In October 1960, Davies was announced as the next Director of the Women's Royal Naval Service, in succession to Dame Elizabeth Hoyer-Millar.

On 17 May 1961, she was promoted to commandant (equivalent to commodore) and appointed Honorary Aide-de-Camp to Queen Elizabeth II. She was appointed a Dame Commander of the Order of the British Empire in the 1963 Birthday Honours, and retired from the military in 1964.

== Later life ==
Davies married Roy Cavander Lancaster, a military officer formerly with the East Kent Regiment, at the Chapel of Gray's Inn on 28 March 1967. He died in 1981, predeceasing her. In her final years, Dame Jean Davies Lancaster lived at Warren Park Nursing Home in Blundellsands, Merseyside. She died on 29 August 1996, aged 87.

Military offices
| Preceded by Elizabeth Hoyer-Millar | Director of the Women's Royal Naval Service; 1961–1964 | Succeeded by Margaret Drummond |
