= Patricia Swallow =

Commandant of the British Women's Royal Naval Service

Commandant Patricia Swallow CBE
- Born: 1931/1932; UK
- Military career
- Allegiance: United Kingdom
- Branch: Women's Royal Naval Service
- Service years: 1950–1986
- Rank: Commandant
- Commands: Women's Royal Naval Service
- Awards: Commander of the Order of the British Empire

Daphne Patricia Swallow, CBE (born 1931/1932) was commandant of the Women's Royal Naval Service from 1982 to 1986. A communications officer, she had followed in the footsteps of her father who served in the Royal Navy as a signals officer. Swallow also had an interest in bird watching and served as vice president of the Royal Naval Bird Watching Society. She was appointed aide-de-camp to Queen Elizabeth II and made a Commander of the Order of the British Empire. After her 1986 retirement Swallow carried out charity work.

== Naval career ==
Daphne Patricia Swallow was the daughter of Captain Geoffrey Swallow, a Royal Navy signals officer who served aboard destroyers, including with the 4th Destroyer Flotilla. Swallow, who was known by her middle name, joined the Women's Royal Naval Service (the Wrens) at the age of 18 in 1950. She followed in the footsteps of her father to become a communications officer and served on postings to Malta, Norway, Portsmouth, Gibraltar and at the Royal Navy's Northwood Headquarters.

She served at several stone frigates (Navy shore establishments) including HMS Mercury, HMS Pembroke and HMS Heron. She commanded the Wren training establishment at HMS Dauntless from 1973.

Swallow was a bird watcher and served as vice president of the Royal Naval Bird Watching Society from at least 1978 to 1984.

Swallow was one of the first women to attend the National Defence College and was the first woman to hold the position of command personnel officer at Portsmouth. She later served as staff officer for training and the command Wrens officer at the Portsmouth Dockyard.

Swallow was appointed deputy director of the Wrens in 1979 and also became a Fellow of the British Institute of Management. She was appointed director and commander of the Wrens on 30 July 1982, succeeding Elizabeth Craig-McFeely, and at the same time was appointed aide-de-camp to Queen Elizabeth II. Swallow was appointed a Commander of the Order of the British Empire in the 1986 New Year Honours. She ceased to be commandant on 6 February 1986, being succeeded by Marjorie Fletcher, and retired on 4 April 1986. Swallow afterwards worked for charities and got married in 1991.
