= HMS Talbot (1807) =

Sloop of the Royal Navy

History

United Kingdom
- Name: HMS Talbot
- Ordered: 4 October 1805
- Builder: James Heath & Sons, East Teignmouth
- Laid down: March 1806
- Launched: 22 July 1807
- Fate: Sold 1815 into mercantile service

United Kingdom
- Name: George
- Owner: Johnson
- Acquired: 1816 by purchase
- Fate: Last listed in 1831

General characteristics
- Class & type: Cormorant class ship-sloop; reclassed 1811 as Post ship
- Type: Quarterdeck ship-sloop
- Tons burthen: 48446/94, or 488, or 498 (bm)
- Length: Overall: 113 ft 2 1/2 in (34.5 m); Keel: 94 ft 1 in (28.7 m)
- Beam: 31 ft 1 3/8 in (9.5 m)
- Draught: Unladen: 7 ft 3 in (2.2 m); Laden: 10 ft 6 in (3.2 m)
- Depth of hold: 9 ft 4 in (2.8 m)
- Propulsion: Sails
- Complement: 121
- Armament: UD: 18 × 32-pounder carronades; QD: 6 × 12-pounder carronades; Fc: 2 × 6-pounder guns + 2 × 12-pounder carronades; Centreline: 1 × 12-pounder gun

HMS Talbot was a British Royal Navy 18-gun sloop-of-war built by James Heath & Sons, of East Teignmouth, and launched in 1807. Perhaps her greatest accomplishment was the reversal of the liberation of Iceland that the colorful, erratic, former Royal Navy seaman and privateer Jørgen Jørgensen had carried out. Talbot was sold in 1815 for mercantile service. Renamed George, she interspersed several voyages to Ceylon and India with three voyages as a whaler in the British southern whale fishery. She was last listed in 1831.

== Talbot Class ==
Talbot was the lead ship for a class of two sloops; her sister ship was HMS Coquette. Both were enlarged versions of the Cormorant-class ship-sloop. In 1811 the Admiralty re-rated Talbot and Coquette as 20-gun post ships.

== Service ==
The Admiralty commissioned Talbot in September 1807 under Commander the Honourable Alexander Jones, who about a year later sailed her to Portugal. (Note: On 15 June 1804 a court martial had ordered Jones, then a lieutenant in Naiad, shot for striking Lieutenant Dean, the senior lieutenant, during a quarrel on the quarterdeck. Dean was dismissed from the Navy for having behaved in an ungentlemanly manner towards his messmate. On 25 June Jones received a pardon, his sword was returned to him and he was restored to his former rank. "He appeared greatly affected by this fresh instance of his Majesty's clemency". Jones was promoted to Commander on 22 January 1806.)

In 1808 Jones and Talbot took three prizes: Lykens Proven (14 April), Union (17 May), and Bon Jesus e Almar (9 May).

In 1809 Talbot was in the North Sea where she captured several prizes: Twee Gebroederss (26 April), Bagatellen (29 April), Neskelaen (30 April), Emanuel (2 May), Providentia (10 May), Gestina and Nautilus (18 May), and Sara Catharina (19 May). The most notable, but still minor, capture occurred on 13 June when Talbot captured the Danish privateer Loven, off the Naze of Norway. Loven had two long guns, which she had dismounted during the chase, and a crew of 11. She had left Norway that morning and had made no captures.

Talbot entered the harbour at Reykjavík on 14 August. After some investigation Jones took Jørgen Jørgensen into custody. Jørgensen had arrested the Danish governor and proclaimed himself "His Excellency, the Protector of Iceland, Commander in Chief by Land and Sea". With Talbot's arrival, the Danish government was restored and Jørgensen was taken to England, where he ended up in prison for more than a year, but for breaking parole after his earlier capture by Sappho, not for his adventures in Iceland.

On 14 November, three Danish sloops arrived at Leith, prizes to Talbot, the sloop Charles, and the cutter Hero.

In 1811, Captain Spelman Swaine commanded Talbot on the Irish station. (Note: For more on Spelman Swaine see: O'Byrne, William R. (1849). "Swaine, Spelman" . A Naval Biographical Dictionary. London: John Murray.) On 30 November she was in company with the frigate Saldanha as they sailed from Lough Swilly, Donegal, where they were based. Four days later a gale caught them in the Lough. Saldanha foundered with the loss of her entire crew; Talbot got out to sea and survived.

Later Talbot protected merchants sailing to and from Newfoundland and the West Indies. On 5 August 1812, Talbot captured the American ship Rhoda and Betsey.

Swaine transferred to Statira on 28 April 1814 after Lieutenant Thomas Walbeoff Cecil of Argo killed Captain Hassard Stackpole, of Statira, in a duel. (Cecil was promoted into Electra but died of yellow fever in 1814.) Swaine's successor, in April 1814, was Captain Henry Haynes.

Disposal: In September 1814 Captain William Dowers took command of Talbot. Captain Archibald Tisdall succeeded him in July 1815. (Note: For more on Archibald Tisdall see: O'Byrne, William R. (1849). "Tisdall, Archibald" . A Naval Biographical Dictionary. London: John Murray.) She was paid off in August or September 1815 before the Admiralty sold her on 23 November for £1,610 for mercantile use. Talbot entered mercantile service as George.

Post-script to Talbot's naval career: Early in 1815 Talbot captured John, an American merchant vessel. However, it turned out that the US and Great Britain had signed a peace treaty on Christmas Eve 1814, so she was not a prize. Furthermore, John was lost to "the perils of the sea" while in custody, leading to a suit by her owners against Talbot's captain. That suit was dismissed, but the United States claimed on behalf of the owners against the British government, and the court judged that the government did owe compensation. The settlement took place after 1853.

== Merchantman ==
In 1813 the British East India Company (EIC) had lost its monopoly on the trade between England and India. Many ownersthen sailed in that trade under a license from the EIC.

Her owners renamed Talbot George, and she first appeared in the 1816 volume of Lloyd's Register with R.M. Arle, master, Johnson & Co. owner, and trade London–Bengal. The 1816 volume misreported her burthen as 424 tons, but the 1818 volume corrected that; in 1818 her trade was listed as London–Calcutta.

On 14 September 1817 R.M. Arle sailed George for Fort William, India.

On George's return, Johnson sent her on the first of three whaling voyages.

First whaling voyage (1818–1822): Captain Bonifal or Bunnifer or Bunfer or Thompson sailed from England on 1 December 1818, bound for the Galápagos Islands. She returned on 4 June 1822 with 65 casks of sperm oil, 35 casks of "headmatter", and 50 casks of whale and elephant oil.

Second whaling voyage (1822–c.1825): Captain Fitch sailed George to Peru in 1822. She was reported to have been on the coast of "Chili" in 1824 with some 1799 barrels. There is no record of the date of her return.

Voyages to Ceylon and India: The Register of Shipping for 1826 shows George with Berscan (or Burscan), master, and trade London–Ceylon. She apparently sailed for Ceylon in 1825. The 1827 volume shows Captain Clark replacing Berscan, and then Captain Fulcher replacing Clark. On 10 April 1827 Captain Fulcher and George sailed from Gravesend, bound for India. George was carrying several families of missionaries for Quilon.

Third whaling voyage (1828–1831): Captain M'Alley (or McCully) left England on 28 July 1828, bound for New Zealand and the Pacific Ocean. George was reported to have been at New Zealand 1 February 1829, the Kingsmill Islands in May–June, and Tongatapu in November. In July 1830 she was at San Francisco. She returned to England on 27 May 1831 with 209 casks sperm oil and headmatter.

== Fate ==
George was no longer listed in either Lloyd's Register or the Register of Shipping in 1832.
