= Mary Talbot (WRNS officer) =

British naval officer

Commandant Mary Talbot CB
- Born: 17 February 1922
- Died: 11 May 2012 (aged 90)
- Military career
- Allegiance: United Kingdom
- Branch: Royal Navy
- Service years: 1943–1976
- Rank: Commandant
- Commands: Women's Royal Naval Service (1973–76); HMS Dauntless (1972–1973)
- Conflicts: Second World War
- Awards: Companion of the Order of the Bath

Commandant Mary Irene Talbot, CB (17 February 1922 – 11 May 2012) was a British naval officer who served as Director of the Women's Royal Naval Service from 1973 to 1976.

== Early life and education ==
Talbot was born on 17 February 1922. She studied philosophy and economics at the University of Bristol, and graduated with a Bachelor of Arts degree.

== Military career ==
In November 1943, Talbot joined the Women's Royal Naval Service (WRNS) as a naval recruiting assistant. She undertook the officer training course in 1944, and she was made an acting third officer (equivalent in rank to acting sub-lieutenant) with seniority from 10 September. She was then stationed at HMS Eaglet, where she served as an education and resettlement officer for the remainder of the Second World War.

From 1945 to 1961, Talbot served on the staff of three separate commanders-in-chief: Mediterranean Fleet, The Nore, and Portsmouth. She was promoted to second officer (equivalent to lieutenant) in March 1946 with seniority from 1 January, to first officer (equivalent to lieutenant commander) in 1952, and to chief officer (equivalent to commander) in 1960. From 1963 to 1966, she served on the staff of the Director of Naval Manning. In 1969, she was promoted to superintendent (equivalent to captain) and assigned to the staff of the Commander-in-Chief, Naval Home Command. She was superintendent-in-charge of HMS Dauntless, the WRNS' training establishment, from 1972 to 1973. Finally, from July 1973 to July 1976, she served as Director of the WRNS. As director, she was promoted to commandant (equivalent to commodore). In 1974, she instigated a Ministry of Defence Study Group to investigate the role of the WRNS: the report would lead to the women being integrated in the previously all-male Royal Navy.

Talbot was appointed an Honorary Aide-de-Camp (Hon ADC) to Queen Elizabeth II in 1973 and, in the 1975 New Year Honours, was appointed a Companion of the Order of the Bath. Talbot retired from the WRNS on 18 October 1976.

== Later life ==
Talbot was awarded an honorary Doctor of Letters (LLD) degree by the University of Bristol in July 1993. She died, aged 90, on 11 May 2012.

Military offices
Preceded by Daphne Blundell	Director of the Women's Royal Naval Service; 1973–1976	Succeeded by Vonla McBride
