= Vonla McBride =

(1921–2003), UK naval officer

Commandant Vonla McBride CB
- Born: 20 January 1921; Ballygarvey, County Antrim, Ireland
- Died: 2 August 2003 (aged 82); Downton, Wiltshire, England
- Military career
- Allegiance: United Kingdom
- Branch: Women's Royal Naval Service
- Service years: 1949–1979
- Rank: Commandant
- Commands: Women's Royal Naval Service (1976–1979)
- Awards: Companion of the Order of the Bath

Sara Vonla Adair McBride, CB (20 January 1921 – 2 August 2003) was a senior British naval officer who served as Director of the Women's Royal Naval Service from 1976 to 1979. She was sent to advise Haile Selassie and later in life served as Chair of the Civil Service Commissioners' Interview Panel from 1985 to 1991.

== Early life and education ==
McBride was born in Ballygarvey, County Antrim, on 20 January 1921. Her parents were Agnes and Andrew Stewart McBride. Her father was a farmer and miller. She was educated at Ballymena Academy, a grammar school in Ballymena, County Antrim. She studied English and French at Trinity College, Dublin, graduating in 1942 with a Bachelor of Arts degree.

Having graduated from university, McBride returned to Ballymena Academy as a teacher. In time she moved to Gardenhurst School in Burnham on Sea, England, as a demonstration of her independence.

== Naval career ==
McBride joined the Women's Royal Naval Service (WRNS) in 1949. The organisation had been formed during the First World War and re-established in 1939 to free men to go to war. It started out as just cleaning and cooking but the range of tasks quickly expanded. McBride was sent to HMS Dauntless, the WRNS's training centre in Burghfield, to be trained as an officer.

McBride entered a human resources role, which was unusual for a woman. Her career made rapid progress, although she was prevented from becoming a French interpreter. This was one of the roles that only men were allowed to do. She was sent to advise Haile Selassie when he wanted to create a women's service.

In the 1970s it became obvious that equal pay for women and the need to remove sexual discrimination meant that the WRNS and the Royal Navy would become one organisation. The key change was that women would become subject to the Naval Discipline Act 1957. This meant that women had more serious punishments but it also allowed then to take on roles that had previously been denied to them. McBride, who had experience in human resource management, became the Director of the WRNS in 1976. Members of the WRNS were subject to the same disciplinary standards as men from 1977. She was appointed a Companion of the Order of the Bath in the 1979 Birthday Honours, and retired soon after.

== Later life ==
Having left the military, McBride became Director of the City of London Region of Lloyds Bank in 1980. In addition, she served as Chair of the Civil Service Commissioners' Interview Panel from 1985 to 1991. She retired in 1991.

McBride died in Downton, Wiltshire, England on 2 August 2003, aged 82.

Military offices
Preceded by Mary Talbot	Director of the Women's Royal Naval Service; 1976–1979	Succeeded by Elizabeth Craig-McFeely
