= Marion Kettlewell =

Commandant Dame Marion Kettlewell DBE
- Born: 20 February 1914; Strawberry Hill, Twickenham, Richmond upon Thames, London, U.K.
- Died: 11 April 2016 (aged 102)
- Military career
- Allegiance: United Kingdom
- Branch: Women's Royal Naval Service
- Service years: 1941–1970
- Rank: Commandant
- Commands: Women's Royal Naval Service (1967–1970)
- Conflicts: Second World War
- Awards: Dame Commander of the Order of the British Empire

Dame Marion Mildred Kettlewell, DBE (20 February 1914 – 11 April 2016) was a senior British naval officer who served as Director of the Women's Royal Naval Service from 1967 to 1970.

Kettlewell was born in Strawberry Hill, Twickenham, Richmond upon Thames, London on 20 February 1914. She joined the Women's Royal Naval Service in 1941, during the Second World War. She rose to the rank of commandant and was appointed Director of the Women's Royal Naval Service in 1967. Made a Dame Commander of the Order of the British Empire in the 1970 New Year Honours, Kettlewell retired later that year.

Military offices
Preceded by Margaret Drummond	Director of the Women's Royal Naval Service; 1967–1970	Succeeded by Daphne Blundell
