= HMS Anacreon (1813) =

Sloop of the Royal Navy

- Anacreon

History

United Kingdom
- Name: HMS Anacreon
- Namesake: Anacreon
- Ordered: 12 July 1805
- Builder: Initially: Owen, Ringmore, South Devon; Later:After Owen went bankrupt, master shipwright Joseph Tucker at Plymouth Dockyard completed the construction
- Laid down: Initially:July 1809; Later:August 1810 After Owen's bankruptcy, what was on the stocks was taken apart and moved to Plymouth Dockyard, where work resumed
- Launched: 1 May 1813
- Fate: Foundered without a trace in 1814

General characteristics
- Class & type: Revived Cormorant-class sloop
- Tons burthen: 42713/94 (bm)
- Length: Overall:108 ft 9 in (33.1 m); Keel:91 ft 1 3/8 in (27.8 m)
- Beam: 29 ft 8 1/4 in (9.0 m)
- Depth of hold: 9 ft 0 in (2.7 m)
- Complement: 121 (Royal Navy)
- Armament: Upper deck:16 × 32-pounder carronades; QD:6 × 18-pounder carronades; Fc:2 × 6-pounder chase guns + 2 × 18-pounder carronades

HMS Anacreon had an extremely brief career. She was commissioned in early 1813 and was lost within a year.

== Career ==
Commander John Davies supposedly commissioned her in May 1813, but she had apparently already been in service by then. On 9 April 1813 Eleanor Wilhelmina arrived at Yarmouth, Anacreon having detained her as she was sailing from North Bergen. Davies then sailed Anacreon for Lisbon on 3 August.

On 1 February 1814 she recaptured the Spanish ship Nostra Senora del Carmen la Sirena. Late in January the French privateer Lion had captured three ships in all and plundered two, which she had permitted to go on to Lisbon. Anacreon had recaptured the third, Nostra Senora..., and then had set off in pursuit of the privateer. (Note: A first-class share of the salvage money for Nostra Senora... was worth £91 10s 4d; a sixth-class share, that of an ordinary seaman, was worth £1 19s 6d.)

== Loss ==
Anacreon was last sighted on 28 February 1814 in the English Channel as she was returning from Lisbon. Soon thereafter, she disappeared without trace in a storm. All aboard were lost.

== See also ==
- List of people who disappeared mysteriously at sea
