= HMS Dauntless =

Five ships and one shore establishment of the Royal Navy have borne the name HMS Dauntless:

- HMS Dauntless (1804) was an 18-gun sloop launched at Hull, England in November 1804. In 1807 she ran aground during a battle in the Vistula River and was forced to surrender to the French.
- HMS Dauntless (1808) was a 26-gun sloop launched in 1808 and sold for breaking in 1825.
- HMS Dauntless (1847) was a 24-gun (from 1854, 33-gun) frigate launched in 1847 and sold for breaking in 1885.
- HMS Dauntless (D45) was a Danae-class light cruiser launched in 1918. She was used as a training vessel from 1943 before being sold for breaking in 1946.
- HMS Dauntless was the WRNS training establishment at Burghfield, near Reading, Berkshire, from 1947 until 1981.
- HMS Dauntless (D33) is a Type 45 destroyer launched on 23 January 2007 at the BAE Systems Govan shipyard in Glasgow, and commissioned in June 2010.

== Battle honours ==
Ships named Dauntless have earned the following battle honours:

- Baltic, 1854
- Crimea, 1854–55
- Atlantic, 1939

== In popular culture ==
- In the 2003 film Pirates of the Caribbean: The Curse of the Black Pearl, a fictional HMS Dauntless appears as the flagship and pride of the Royal Navy. It is later revealed in Pirates of the Caribbean: Dead Man's Chest that the ship was destroyed between the two movies by a hurricane.
