= Sir George Osborne (1814 ship) =

History

France
- Launched: 1810
- Captured: c.1814

United Kingdom
- Name: Sir George Osborne
- Owner: 1814:Broderick & Co.; 1821:John Goodson, William Irish, & William Moutrie; 1825:
- Acquired: 1814 by purchase of a prize (Note: One report has her being condemned in prize court on 6 May 1806 after being taken. However, all other information is consistent with her being launched in 1810 and being taken c.1814.)
- Fate: Wrecked and abandoned 1829

General characteristics
- Tons burthen: 310, or 312, or 31258/94, or 313, or 316 (bm)
- Length: 93 ft 10 in (28.6 m)
- Beam: 28 ft 5 in (8.7 m)

Sir George Osborne was acquired in 1814 by British owners purchasing a prize. They initially sailed her as a West Indiaman. Then in 1820 she carried immigrants to South Africa under the auspices of a settler scheme. She next made one voyage as a whaler in the British southern whale fishery. Under new owners she then made a highly unusual voyage to the Pacific. Her new owners were the founders of the Pacific Pearl Fishery Company (est. 1825), and they sailed her on a voyage that was part commercial venture and part scientific exploration, complete with a resident scientist. After her return new owners sent her whaling to the Seychelles, where she was wrecked and abandoned in April 1829.

== Career ==
Sir George Osborne entered Lloyd's Register (LR) in the 1815 volume (published in 1814), with W. Hewett, master, Broderick & Co. owner, and trade Plymouth–Bristol, changing to Bristol–Dominica. The trade data are consistent with Sir George Osborne being a prize brought into Plymouth and being condemned and sold there with her new owners then sailing her to Bristol.

An advertisement in October 1814 by Robert Noyes describes her as new, and stated that she would be sailing to Madeira, Barbados, Martinique, and Dominica, with William Hewitt, commander. In September 1815 Edward Jones & Sons, and Redcliff Back, offered her for sale. In 1816 Captain Hewitt was her master and owner and under his command she made a voyage to Trinidad.

=== Immigrants to South Africa ===
Sir George Osborne was one of the many vessels that brought immigrants to South Africa from England under the 1820 Settlers scheme. The "Sir George Osborne Transport" sailed from Gravesend and left the Downs on 16 March 1820, bound for the Cape of Good Hope. Edward Turvey led a group of 61 immigrants, Daniel Mills led a group of 29 immigrants, and Edward Gardner led a group of 29 immigrants. She arrived at Simon's Bay on 19 June. She sailed on to Algoa Bay, Port Elizabeth and arrived there in July. Sir George Osborne, Telfar, master, arrived back at Portsmouth on 2 February 1821.

=== Whaling voyage ===
Captain John Stavers sailed from England on 24 April 1821 on a whaling voyage. He returned on 22 July 1823 with 500 casks of whale oil and one cask of ambergris. (Note: Captain Stavers' next voyage was as captain of the whaler Coquette. He was murdered at Guam in 1825 during the voyage.)

On her return, Sir George Osborne's owners offered her for sale.

...she has undergone great repair...particularly adapted for the Southern Whale Fishery, a Coffee Ship, the South American, or any Trade where fair burthen and great dispatch are required...

Lloyd's Register reported that Sir George Osborne had damages repaired in 1824. It also showed her master changing from Stavers to Coulson. In the 1825 volume her owner was Moultrie and her trade was London–Cape of Good Hope. Captain Coulson sailed from Gravesend for the Cape on 11 September 1824, and arrived there on 29 November. Sir George Osborne sailed for London on 6 February 1825, and arrived at Gravesend on 17 April.

=== Voyage of exploration ===
Joseph Thompson, who had engaged in whaling, seal hunting, and pearl fishing in the Pacific, and Thomas Icely, the majority shareholder in a vessel of which Thompson was master, created the Pacific Pearl Fishery Company. They floated the company in April 1825.

The Pacific Pearl Fishery Company purchased Sir George Osborne, with Thompson as master, and chartered or purchased a second vessel, Rolla, with Nielson (or Nelson) as master. LR for 1826 showed Sir George Osborne with Thompson, master, South Pacific Company as owner, and trade London–Peru. The venture was part commercial enterprise and part scientific exploration in that the partners engaged the naturalist Samuel Stutchbury to document the expedition.

Sir George Osborne, Thompson, master, and Rolla, Nelson, master, sailed for New South Wales on 15 August 1825. (Note: Rolla, of 236 tons (bm), was the former Cherokee-class brig-sloop HMS Rolla, which the Royal Navy had sold in 1822. Three directors of the Pacific Pearl Fishing Company, Stewart Marjoribanks, William Kershaw, and William Gill Paxton (MP), purchased her for the venture. One source confuses Rolla with a vessel that had been launched in 1816 at New Providence, the Bahamas.) Sir George Osborne was also carrying Jane and William Williams who were sailing to New Zealand to serve there as missionaries. Her cargo included 300 stud merino sheep for New South Wales.

The Sydney Gazette and New South Wales Advertiser reported on Sir George Osborne's arrival, and published the prospectus for the Pacific Pearl Fishing Company. The newspaper noted that apparently many of the initial investors had immediately sold their shares.

Sir George Osborne sailed from Sydney on 18 March 1826 and landed at Paihia, Bay of Islands, on 26 March. From there she sailed to gather pearls in the Tuamoto Archipelago, particularly in the Hao Atoll.

On 19 January 1827 Sir George Osborne passed between two portions of Neilson Reef. (Note: In 1831 Lancaster struck the reef. Sir George Osborne put the gap at 27°00′S 146°17′W. In 1895 the French naval vessel Pourvoyer determined the gap's correct position to be 27°01′30″S 146°2′0″W. This is some 120 miles NNW of Rapa Iti, and 500 miles west of Pitcairn Islands. For a synopsis of the expedition's visit to Rapa Iti see Richards.)

A report dated "Sydney, 7 March" stated that the voyage of Sir George Osborne and Rolla had met with considerable success. Sir George Osborne had been despatched to England with a full cargo. The principal part consisted of shells, arrow-root, cocoa nut, oil, etc., which had been procured in the Society Islands.

Sir George Osborne arrived at Dartmouth in May 1827. She brought the first news to London of the death of Pōmare III, the King of Otaheite. The young king had died of dysentery, leaving no male heir. On 25 June 1827 there appeared in the Public Ledger and Daily Advertiser and advertisement for 40 tons of "Cocoa Nut oil" that Sir George Osborne had brought from Otaheite. Stutchbury published a catalogue of the scientific samples that he had collected.

Once again Sir George Osborne was offered for sale.

...312 tons per register...adapted particularly for a South Seaman or Passenger Ship. Now lying in the West India Import Dock.

=== Whaler ===
| Year | Master | Owner | Trade | Source |
|---|---|---|---|---|
| 1828 | House | Blythe & Co. | London–South Seas | LR; fir, raised 1814, decks 1827 |

Sir George Osborne was reported to have been at the Seychelles with 30 barrels of whale oil in September 1828.

== Fate ==
On 24 April 1829, Sir George Osborne, House, master, ran aground in the Seychelles. She broke up after her crew had abandoned her. Her cargo of 1000 barrels of whale oil was retrieved and transshipped.

As the whaling grounds were worked out, one by one, and ships had to go farther and farther afield, masters had to go into unexplored and imperfectly uncharted waters. It is noteworthy how many many islands in the oceans were discovered, or rediscovered, by whaling and sailing masters. With such discoveries went the risks of running aground on some uncharted island, reef or rock. Such happenings were quite frequent, sometimes with the loss of ship, cargo and lives. Occasionally it was possible to unload the oil and send it home, at a cost. That was what happened when the Sir George Osborne ran ashore in the Seychelles in 1829. Such risks were always present.
