= Daphne Blundell =

Senior British naval officer (1916–2004)

Commandant Daphne Blundell CB
- Born: 19 August 1916
- Died: 24 May 2004 (aged 87)
- Military career
- Allegiance: United Kingdom
- Branch: Women's Royal Naval Service
- Service years: 1942–1973
- Rank: Commandant
- Commands: Women's Royal Naval Service (1970–73)
- Conflicts: Second World War
- Awards: Companion of the Order of the Bath

Daphne Mary Blundell, CB (19 August 1916 – 24 May 2004) was a senior British naval officer, who served as Director of the Women's Royal Naval Service from 1970 to 1973.

== Early life and education ==
Blundell was born on 19 August 1916. She was educated at St Helen's School, an all-girls private school in Northwood, London. She studied at Bedford College, London, the first higher education institution for women in the United Kingdom.

== Naval career ==
Blundell joined the Women's Royal Naval Service (WRNS) in November 1942. She was promoted to acting third officer (equivalent to sub-lieutenant) on 26 September 1943. During her early career, she served in Orkney, Ceylon, East Africa, and Malta. She served on the staff of Flag Officer Naval Air Command from 1964 to 1967. She was promoted to superintendent (equivalent to captain) in 1967. She was on the staff of Commander-in-Chief, Portsmouth between 1967 and 1969. From 1969 to 1970, she was superintendent of WRNS Training and Drafting. In 1970, she was appointed Director of the WRNS and promoted to commandant (equivalent to commodore).

Blundell was appointed an Honorary Aide-de-Camp to the Queen on 8 July 1970 and, in the 1972 Birthday Honours, she was appointed a Companion of the Order of the Bath. She stepped down as Honorary Aide-de-Camp in July 1973, and retired from the WRNS on 24 August.

== Later life ==
In retirement, Blundell served as President of the Association of Wrens. She never married nor had any children.

Blundell died on 24 May 2004, aged 87. Her funeral was held at Holy Trinity Church, Northwood on 3 June 2004.

Military offices
Preceded by Dame Marion Kettlewell	Director of the Women's Royal Naval Service; 1970–1973	Succeeded by Mary Talbot
