= HMS Jalouse (1809) =

UK naval sloop 1809–1819

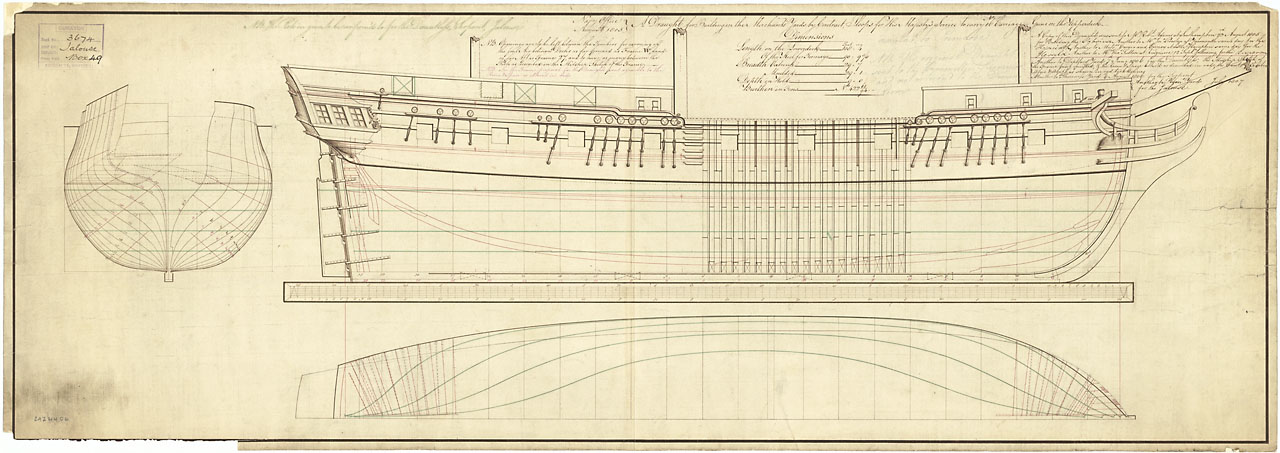
- Body plan for Jalouse, made in 1805.

History

United Kingdom
- Name: HMS Jalouse
- Ordered: 15 January 1806
- Builder: Plymouth Dockyard
- Launched: 20 December 1808
- Commissioned: 13 July 1809
- Fate: Sold 8 March 1819

General characteristics
- Class & type: Cormorant-class ship-sloop
- Tons burthen: 42512/94 (bm)
- Length: 108 ft 4 1/2 in (33.0 m) (overall); 90 ft 9 3/4 in (27.7 m) (keel)
- Beam: 29 ft 8 in (9.04 m)
- Depth of hold: 9 ft 0 in (2.7 m)
- Sail plan: Ship
- Complement: 121
- Armament: Upperdeck: 16 × 32-pounder carronades; QD: 6 × 18-pounder carronades; Fc: 2 × 18-pounder carronades + 2 × 6-pounder bow chasers

HMS Jalouse was a Cormorant-class ship-sloop of the British Royal Navy launched in 1809 and sold in 1819. She participated in the capture of a French privateer, but spent most of her active service escorting convoys. The Navy sold her in 1819.

== Career ==
The Navy commissioned Jalouse in June 1809 for the Irish Station and under the command of Commander Henry G. Morris. Choice, Clark, master, had been sailing from Oporto to London when the French privateer Dougay Trouin captured her. Jalouse recaptured Choice on 23 November and sent her to Cork, Ireland.

On 28 January 1810 Phoenix and Jalouse chased the 14-gun French privateer brig Charles, but lost her in thick fog. The next day Phoenix discovered Charles anchored close under the French coast. A cutting out expedition then went in with boats. Charles had a crew of 70 men, who resisted with grapeshot and small arms fire, killing one seaman on Phoenix and wounding another; Jalouse had no casualties Still, the boats succeeded in taking Charles, where they found two English masters and 13 seamen who the privateers had taken out of vessels a few days previously. One of the vessels Charles had captured was David, Wilkinson, master, which had been sailing from Newfoundland to Waterford. Her captors sent Charles into Plymouth. (Note: Charles was a privateer from Bordeaux. From December 1808, she was under the command of Captain Plassiard. She was a joint-venture between Plassiard, the merchant Balguerie, and the Protestant merchants Baour frères. She made a commercial voyage to Senegal and on her return in 1809 the partners fitted her out as a privateer.)

On 3 November 1811 Jalouse departed Cork to join with the convoy that departed for Lisbon on the 27 October, after experiencing most dreadful weather.

In September 1812 Commander Abraham Lowe replaced Morris. On 23 December 1812 Jalouse arrived at Cork, after seeing a convoy to Cadiz and a month's cruise, during which time she captured, to the westward of the Great Belt, two American brigs.

On 23 May 1813, the American privateer Paul Jones captured Betsey, Roberts, master, which had been sailing from Liverpool to Lisbon. Betsey had been part of a convoy from Cork that Jalouse and Castilian. That same day Leonidas recaptured Betsey, and captured Paul Jones, both about 100 miles (160 km) south of Cape Clear. (Note: Paul Jones was armed with fifteen 6-pounder guns and had a crew of 94 men.) Jalouse escorted her convoy as far as Gibraltar and returned to England on 9 July. She then went into quarantine.

On 7 June 1814 Lowe received promotion to post captain and Commander James Bashford replaced him. Lieutenant John Undrell received promotion to Commander on 13 June 1815 and took command of Jalouse for the Jamaica station. In 1816 Commander Edward Hall replaced Undrell.

== Fate ==
Jalouse was paid-off at Chatham in January 1816. The "Principal Officers and Commissioners of His Majesty's Navy" offered "Jalouse, of 26 guns and, 425 tons", lying at Chatham, for sale on 8 March 1819. She sold there to G. Young on that date for £1,660.
