= Hired armed cutter Hero =

Two vessels served the British Royal Navy as His Majesty's Hired armed cutter Hero. Under the command of Lieutenant John Reynolds, the second hired armed cutter Hero captured some 30 merchantmen during the Gunboat War before the Royal Navy returned her to her owners. She was so successful that Norwegian merchants offered a considerable reward for Hero's capture.

There was also an hired armed lugger Hero, and a number of British letters of marque that carried the name Hero, and that were cutters. None of the letter-of-marque cutters match the description of either hired armed cutter Hero.

== The first hired armed cutter Hero ==
The first hired armed cutter Hero carried nine 12-pounder carronades and was of 7790/94 tons (bm). She served the Royal Navy from 20 August 1804 to 3 February 1805.

== The second hired armed cutter Hero ==
The second hired armed cutter Hero carried ten 12-pounder carronades and was of 11927/94 tons (bm). She served the Royal Navy from 4 May 1809 to 11 November 1811.

Whilst under the command of Lieutenant John Reynolds, Hero commenced cruising in The Sleeve (Kattegat) in 1809. On 14 November, three Danish sloops arrived at Leith, prizes to Talbot, the hired armed ship Charles, and Hero.

Some of her first captures included:

- Danish schooner No. 100 (2 November), in company with Ariel;
- Fortuna (4 November); (Note: Part of the money that accrued to Hero from this capture was from an abatement of duties on a cargo of deals (planks) from Fortuna.)-
- Four Sisters (9 November), captured by the hired armed cutter Idas with Hero in company;
- Emanuel (11 November);
- Charlotta Maria (21 November);
- Haabet (23 November);
- Catharina Christiana (29 November); and
- Jonge Frau Maria (9 January 1810).

In 1810 Reynolds discovered that Sälö Fjord, then little known to the British, was a good place of refuge during gales on the Swedish coast. He surveyed it and reported that it was busy.

In April Hero captured:

- Mercurious (9 April);
- Mette Catharine and Speculation (14 April);
- Pedre Oxe (21 April).

On 21 October Hero captured Carl Frederick. One month later, on 21 November 1810 Hero captured the Catharina Christiana.

In early 1811 Hero met with more success in her prize-taking as she captured:

- Klitloben (10 January);
- Siri (10 March);
- Sloop No. 98 (14 March);
- Haas Fagar and Emanuel (15 March);
- Three Brothers (13 April);
- Haabet;
- Schroeder, Providentia, Anna Maria Cecilia, Maria Kirstina, and Concordia (15 April);

However, on 25 April 1811 Hero, while in the company of the Hired armed cutter Swan, encountered three Danish gunboats in The Sleeve. (Note: Anderson gives the day as 23 April, Winfield gives it as 24 April, and Gossett gives it as 25 April.) Swan was forced to surrender but sank off Uddevalla, on the Swedish coast north of Gothenburg, almost immediately after the Danes boarded her. The battle apparently also resulted in damage to Hero. (Note: Gossett has Hero being sunk, but does not report any court martial date.) A frigate helped her into Vingo where she was repaired enough to sail to England for more complete repairs. She arrived at Dover on 7 May.

Still, on 14 July she captured Margaretta, Ebenetzer, and Sophie. On 13 October she captured Fortuna. On 22 July Hero was in company when the gun-brig Urgent captured Trajen and Freden. (Note: These two vessels yielded Reynolds a total of £16 3s 10d in prize money; an ordinary seaman received 15s 6d.) Lastly, on 19 October she captured the Danish galliot Haabet. She returned to Dover on 17 November from the Baltic having again been much damaged in an engagement with Danish gun boats.

Reynolds removed to the Nimble-class cutter Nimble early in 1812. Nimble was wrecked in the Kattegat in October, near the Sälö Beacon, but with no loss of life.

=== Post script ===
Reportedly, Hero spent from end 1812 to 1814 re-fitting at Sheerness. If so, she was not on the rolls of the Royal Navy.

== Hired armed lugger Hero ==
The hired armed lugger Hero served the Royal Navy in 1809 and is described as being of 4013/94 tons burthen.

== British privateer cutter Hero ==
On 18 July 1812, the Baltimore schooner Falcon, of 172 tons, four guns and sixteen men, under the command of Captain John Wilson, was sailing from Boston to Bordeaux. (Note: Cranwell and Crane state that Falcon had no commission as a letter of marque as she had left Baltimore for France months in advance of the outbreak of war.) Off the coast of France she encountered the "British cutter Hero", of five guns and 50 men. Hero sailed off after failing in three attempts during the two-hour running fight to board Falcon. This Hero may have been the cutter under the command of John Feaste, of 72 tons burthen, that sailed under a letter of marque dated 28 April 1812. (The letter further describes Hero as being armed with eight 3 and 6-pounder guns, and having a crew of 30 men.

The next day the British privateer Dart, of six guns and 40 men, succeeded in capturing Falcon after a fight of over an hour in which Wilson and several of his men were wounded. Dart then took Falcon into Guernsey. This may have been the cutter Dart, under the command of Thomas Guilbert, of 114 tons burthen, armed with six 4-pounder guns and with a letter of marque dated 20 May 1812.
