= HMS America (1777) =

Intrepid-class ship of the line

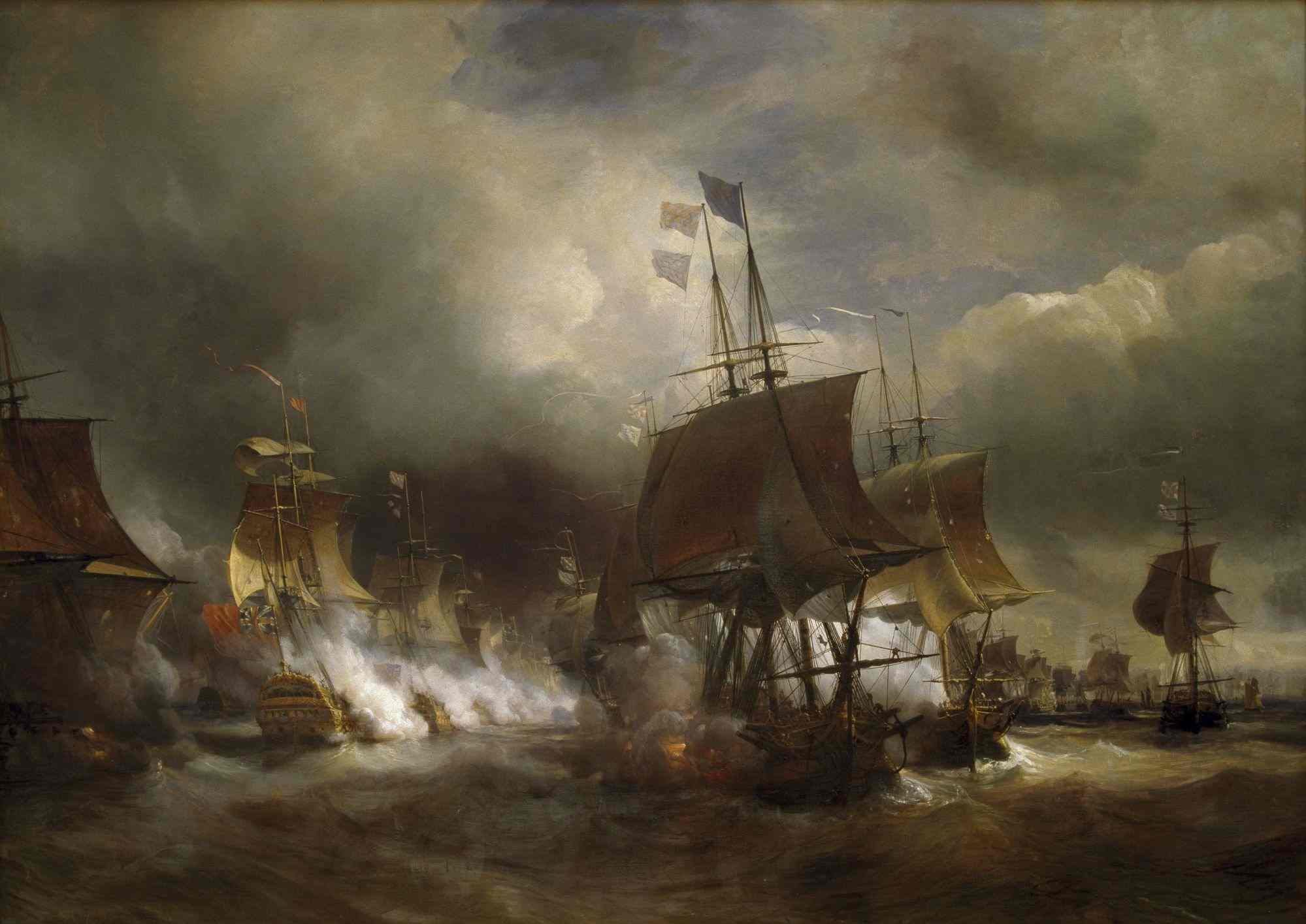
- Battle of Ushant

History

Great Britain
- Name: HMS America
- Ordered: 18 June 1771
- Builder: Deptford Dockyard
- Launched: 5 August 1777
- Fate: Broken up, 1807

General characteristics
- Class & type: Intrepid-class ship of the line
- Tons burthen: 1370 bm
- Length: 159 ft 6 in (48.62 m) (gundeck)
- Beam: 44 ft 4 in (13.51 m)
- Depth of hold: 19 ft (5.8 m)
- Propulsion: Sails
- Sail plan: Full-rigged ship
- Armament: 64 guns: Gundeck: 26 × 24-pounders; Upper gundeck: 26 × 18-pounders; Quarterdeck: 10 × 4-pounders; Forecastle: 2 × 9-pounders

HMS America was a 64-gun third-rate ship of the line of the Royal Navy, designed by John Williams and built by Adam Hayes at Deptford Dockyard and was launched on 5 August 1777. The name was a traditional name in the Royal Navy and continued unabated despite the American War of Independence in 1776.

== Service history ==
Her first commander was Lord Longford, who took America into the Battle of Ushant as part of the Rear Squadron.

America took part in the Battle of the Chesapeake on 5 September 1781, and on 12 April 1782 saw action under command of Captain Thompson in the white squadron as part of the Battle of the Saintes against a French fleet.

In 1795 America was part of the British fleet at the Battle of Muizenberg.

In 1800, the ship was dispatched by Admiral Sir William Parker to sail eastwards. America was under way off the Azores on 13 December 1800 when she ran against the Formigas Reef and suffered severe damage to her hull. With some difficulty she was refloated with the tide and returned to harbour. On 27 December America's captain and senior officers were court martialled aboard HMS Carnatic, which was anchored off Port Royal, Jamaica. All were acquitted when the court established that the grounding had been caused by errors in the ship's charts, upon which the reef was marked as being substantially to the south of its actual location. Admiral Parker was also acquitted in a court martial for having given her orders to leave his area of responsibility in the Americas.

Following the grounding, America was withdrawn from active service and in 1801 was redesignated as a prison ship moored off Jamaica. In 1804 she was loaned to the Transport Board (implying she was still seaworthy). She was decommissioned and broken up in 1807.

== Notable commanders ==
- Lord Longford 1777 to 1779
- James Macnamara 1790
- John Blankett 1794 to 1796
- Edward Buller 1796/7
- Joseph Bingham 1800
