= Joseph Bingham (Royal Navy officer) =

British Royal Navy admiral (1769–1825)

Rear-Admiral Joseph Bingham
- Born: 1769
- Died: 10 December 1825 (aged 55–56)
- Military career
- Allegiance: United Kingdom
- Branch: Royal Navy
- Service years: 1781–1825
- Rank: Rear-Admiral
- Commands: HMS Cormorant; HMS Hannibal; HMS Sampson; HMS Jamaica; HMS Leviathan; HMS Prince George; HMS America; HMS St Fiorenzo; HMS Sceptre; HMS Egmont
- Conflicts: American Revolutionary War; French Revolutionary Wars; Napoleonic Wars

Rear-Admiral Joseph Bingham (c. 1769 – 10 December 1825) was a Royal Navy officer who was appointed Commander-in-Chief, East Indies Station, but never took up the post.

== Naval career ==
Bingham joined the Royal Navy in 1781 as a midshipman on HMS Dublin and took part in the relief of Gibraltar. In January 1793 while serving as third lieutenant on HMS Ganges he assisted in the capture of Le Général Dumourier and other ships, and received his portion of a large amount of prize money. In May 1794, while serving as first lieutenant on HMS Audacious, he was involved in engaging with La Révolutionaire, and his good conduct was reported to the Admiralty.

He was promoted to commander and appointed to the sloop HMS Cormorant and sailed for Jamaica in February 1795. He subsequently commanded HMS Hannibal, HMS Sampson and HMS Jamaica before being given the 74 gun HMS Leviathan. In 1798 he was appointed to HMS Prince George, the flagship of Sir William Parker. He subsequently transferred, with Admiral Parker, to HMS America and was court martialled when that ship was stranded on the Formigas in 1800. He was acquitted by the Court and appointed to HMS St Fiorenzo in 1802.

Bingham sailed to the Cape of Good Hope, and spent the next couple of years operating in the Indian Ocean. On 14 January 1804, St Fiorenzo gave chase to the French naval chasse-marée and aviso Passe-Partout off Mount Dilly on the Malabar Coast. When the wind began to fail, Bingham sent three of his boats after the quarry. Once alongside, in two minutes the British had captured the French vessel, despite fire from two brass six-pounder guns, six brass swivel guns and small arms. Out of her 25-man crew, Passe-Portout had two dead and five seriously wounded, including the captain, who was mortally wounded; the British suffered only one man slightly wounded. Bingham discovered that the French had outfitted Passe Partout to land three officers on the coast to incite the Mahratta states to attack the British. Bingham passed on the intelligence with the result that the British at Poona were able to capture the Frenchmen.

In 1804, he was appointed to HMS Sceptre. He accompanied the expedition sent to the Scheldt under Admiral Strachan and caught the Walcheren Fever. After partially recovering in 1811 he was appointed to HMS Egmont. Promoted to rear-admiral in 1819, he was appointed Commander-in-Chief, East Indies Station but died on 10 December 1825 before he could take up the post.
