= HMS Porgey =

Royal Navy schooner

History

United Kingdom
- Name: HMS Porgey
- Ordered: 11 December 1805
- Builder: Goodrich & Co. (prime contractor), Bermuda
- Laid down: 1806
- Launched: May 1807
- Fate: Burnt to avoid capture 14 June 1810

General characteristics
- Class & type: Ballahoo-class schooner
- Tons burthen: 7041/94 (bm)
- Length: 55 ft 2 in (16.8 m) (overall); 40 ft 10 1/2 in (12.5 m) (keel)
- Beam: 18 ft 0 in (5.5 m)
- Depth of hold: 9 ft 0 in (2.7 m)
- Sail plan: Schooner
- Complement: 20
- Armament: 4 × 12-pounder carronades

HMS Porgey was a Royal Navy Ballahoo-class schooners. The prime contractor for the vessel was Goodrich & Co., in Bermuda, and she was launched in 1807. Like many of her class and the related Cuckoo-class schooners, she succumbed to the perils of the sea relatively early in her career.

== Service ==
She was commissioned in 1807 under Lieutenant Elmes Steele. In June of that year she was in the Bay of Fundy. While there she pursued smugglers and impressed sailors in Passamaquoddy Bay on the border between the United States and the British province of New Brunswick in what is now Canada. Porgey's commander, (acting) Lieutenant James (or John) Flintoph, seems to have landed himself in considerable legal trouble as a result and soon after left the service. (Note: Flintoph's spelling was variable. He described his vessel as "His majesty's armed schooner Pogge".) In June at Passamaquoddy, Maine, he fired on the town (endangering children playing on the green), searched shipping in the harbour, impressed some sailors, and shot away the rigging of a schooner at anchor.

In 1809 Porgey was in the North Sea and came under the command of Lieutenant Hugh Gould. Porgey and her sister schooners Cuckoo and Pilchard were at the unsuccessful Walcheren Expedition, which took place between 30 July and 9 August 1809. Between December 1809 and March 1810 she was in Sheerness undergoing repairs.

== Fate ==
On 4 June 1810 Porgey grounded under enemy fire in the Scheldt estuary while going to the assistance of the hired armed cutter Idas. Lieutenant Gould had Porgey's crew take to her boats and then set fire to her before he left. (Note: Porgey did not, as is sometimes reported, founder in the West Indies in 1812.)
