= HMS Cormorant (1794) =

Cormorant-class sloop of the Royal Navy

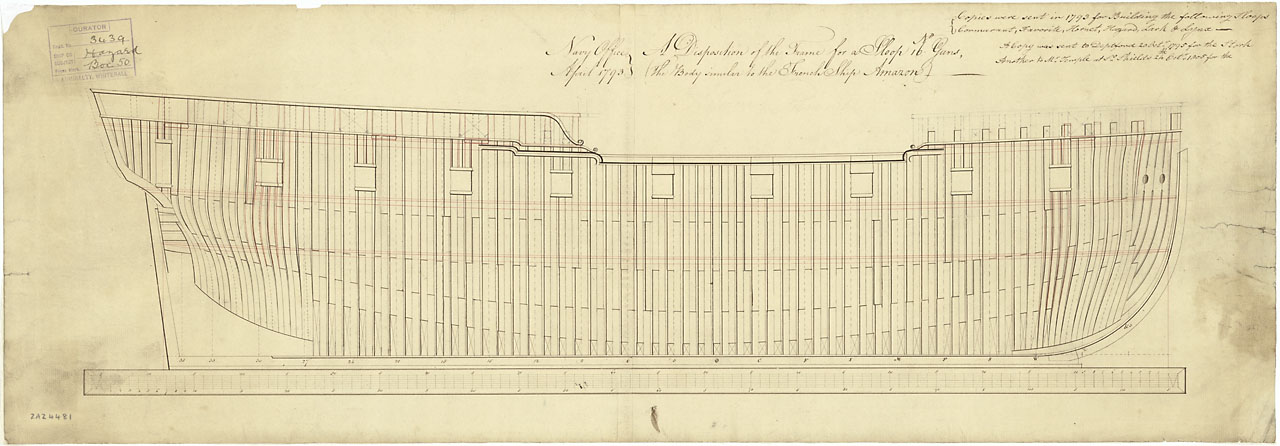
- Drawing showing the framing profile for building the Cormorant

History

Great Britain
- Name: HMS Cormorant
- Ordered: 18 February 1793
- Builder: Randall and Brent, Rotherhithe
- Laid down: April 1793
- Launched: 2 January 1794
- Completed: 10 March 1794 at Deptford Dockyard
- Commissioned: January 1794
- Out of service: Lost 24 December 1796

General characteristics
- Class & type: 16-gun Cormorant-class ship sloop
- Tons burthen: 426 71/94 (bm)
- Length: 108 ft 6 in (33.1 m) (gundeck); 91 ft 6 3/8 in (27.9 m) (keel)
- Beam: 29 ft 8 1/2 in (9.1 m)
- Depth of hold: 9 ft (2.7 m)
- Propulsion: Sails
- Sail plan: Sloop
- Complement: 121
- Armament: 16 × 6-pounder guns; 12 × ½-pounder swivel guns

HMS Cormorant was a 16-gun ship sloop of the Cormorant class in the Royal Navy, launched in 1794 at Rotherhithe. She captured four French privateers before an accidental fire destroyed her in 1796.

== Career ==
The Cormorant was the name-ship of the initial batch of six ship-rigged sloops of the Cormorant Class ordered in February 1793 to a joint design by Sir John Henslow and William Rule, shortly after the outbreak of the French Revolutionary Wars. After launch, she was taken down the Thames to Deptford Naval Dockyard, where she was masted and completed on 10 March 1794.

She entered service under Commander Joshua Morlock. Command passed in July 1794 to Commander Joseph Bingham, under whose command she sailed for Jamaica in February 1795.

Cormorant was at Plymouth on 20 January 1795 and so shared in the proceeds of the detention of the Dutch naval vessels, East Indiamen, and other merchant vessels that were in port on the outbreak of war between Britain and the Netherlands.

On 30 June 1795 Cormorant captured the French privateer Resource Républicain (or Resource République). Then on 27 November Cormorant captured the privateer Petit Créole. Under Bingham, Cormorant also captured the 14-gun privateer Alerte.

In March 1796 Commander Peter Francis Collingwood became her captain, though he is given as her captain when she captured the Vengeance on 19 January. On 21 March 1796 Cormorant supported the landing of troops for an attack on Leogane. The British discovered they were outnumbered and withdrew the next day. Later that year command passed to Commander Thomas Gott.

== Fate ==
On Christmas Eve 1796, Cormorant caught fire by accident at Port-au-Prince and blew up; 95 of her crew were killed (including Gott). A newspaper reported that Gott had been giving a party to celebrate his accession to the command of Cormorant when the accident occurred.
