= Hired armed ship Charles =

British Royal Navy hired armed ship

History

United Kingdom
- Name: Charles
- In service: 17 May 1804
- Out of service: 13 May 1814

General characteristics
- Tons burthen: 3092/94 (bm)
- Armament: 14 × 18-pounder carronades

His Majesty's hired armed ship Charles served the Royal Navy from 17 May 1804 to 13 May 1814. Prize money notices and other accounts referred to her interchangeably as the "hired armed brig", "hired armed ship", and "hired sloop".

Lady's Adventure, Darby, master, arrived at Elsinore on 10 June 1806, having received assistance from Charles. Lady's Adventure had lost her rudder on "Trindall Rock" while sailing from Newcastle to Copenhagen.

In about March 1807 Charles came under the command of G. Davies Robert Clephane on the North Sea station. Between 12 April and 22 May she assisted at the siege of Danzig, together with the hired armed sloop Sally, and HMS Falcon. Charles proved herself useful during the siege and when the British squadron left, evacuated some of General Nikolay Kamensky's troops. On 19 August Charles detained Flensburg and sent her into Grimsby. Flensburg, of Copenhagen, was coming from Messina. In October, by one report, Clephane transferred to HMS Nautilus, but this is not borne out by Nautilus's history.

On 17 January 1808 the "armed brig" Charles arrived at Grimsby much damaged and having lost her masts. She had captured a lugger privateer off the Dogger Bank and sent her into Yarmouth. In March 1808 Clephane assumed command of HMS Acorn.

From April 1808, Charles's commander reportedly was James Welsh. However, in June Charles brought into the Humber two Danish schooners laden with grain, Hercules and Saint Peter. The prize money announcement reports the capture occurred on 3 June, and that commander of the "hired armed brig Charles" was Lieutenant R. Hexter.

On 1 August "His Majesty's Hired Armed Ship Charles", R.H. Hexter, "late commander", captured Vrow Christine.

Then on 13 May 1809, the "hired armed ship Charles", under the command of R.H. Hexter, in company with HMS Talbot, captured Dredokken.

On 23 October Captain Thomas Byam Martin, of Implacable, and chief of the Gottenberg station, sent Hexter and Charles to St Kalf Sound, which is a few miles north of Wingo Sound, Sweden. There she was to protect the vessels of a convoy that a storm had scattered, and send them to Flemish Roads, before bringing the rest of the convoy as soon as possible.

On 14 November, three Danish sloops arrived at Leith, prizes to Talbot, the sloop Charles, and the cutter Hero.

On 4 September 1810 she brought into Grimsby two vessels that she had detained, Jonge Johanes and Neptunus, which was carrying a cargo of fish.

In 1811, Lieutenant Lawrence Smith commanded. In February gales caused the ship Americano, from the Brazils, to run afoul of Charles, resulting in extensive damage to Americano.

Smith was followed in 1812 by Lieutenant J. Mitchell. On 1 August Charles detained and sent into Dover Mars, of and for Wilmington. Mars had been sailing from London. British authorities released Mars a few days later.

On 20 July 1813 she captured the American ship Eliza. Eliza, Wheeler, master, was carrying a cargo of silks to New York. She arrived at Leith on 22 July.

On 18 August Charles captured Emanuel, Humanus Von Leick, master.

The French privateer captured Nancy, Morrison, master, off Beachy Head on 8 October as Nancy was sailing from London to Madeira. Charles recaptured Nancy and brought her into Dover; unfortunately, the master had been killed.

One source states that in 1814 Lieutenant J. Little commanded Charles. However, Lieutenant John Little was in command of HM hired armed schooner Charles between 1811 and 1814.
