= Hired armed cutter Swan =

During the French Revolutionary and Napoleonic Wars the Admiralty also made use of hired armed vessels, one of which was His Majesty's Hired armed cutter Swan. Actually there were two such cutters, but the descriptions of these vessels and the dates of their service are such that they may well represent one vessel under successive contracts. The vessel or vessels cruised, blockaded, carried despatches and performed reconnaissance.

== First hired armed cutter Swan ==
The first Swan was launched in 1797 and served the Royal Navy from 1 July 1799 to 24 October 1801 and also from 6 August 1803 to 21 October 1803. She was a cutter of 14 cannons - twelve 4-pounder guns and two 9-pounder carronades - and a burthen of 12946/94 tons (bm). This vessel is almost certainly the Revenue cutter Swan V (referred to in the section "Swan Revenue Cutters" below)

=== Naval service ===
From 13 August to October 1799 Swan participated in the disastrous Anglo-Russian invasion of Holland under Vice Admiral Andrew Mitchell and Lieutenant General Ralph Abercromby against the Batavian Republic. On 28 August Swan, together with the Hired cutter Active, participated in the capture of the Dutch hulks Drotchterland and Brooderschap, and the ships Helder, Venus, Minerva, and Hector, in the Nieuwe Diep, in Holland. Swan was also among the vessels sharing in the proceeds from the surrender of the Dutch fleet in the Vlieter Incident. On 23 November 1799 Lieutenant-General Sir James Pulteney, second in command of the expedition, was on board Swan supervising the embarkation of the British and Russian troops.

On 12 September there came in to Plymouth the Prussian galliot Vrouw Hildegarde. She had been sailing from Bordeaux to Hamburg with a cargo of brandy and wine when Swan captured her. The galliot Vrouw Hellegonde, prize to "His Majesty's hired armed cutter Swan", Lieutenant H. Stanley, was auctioned at Plymouth on 12 September 1800. (Note: Vrouw Hellegonde, of 10255/94 tons (bm), measured 75 ft 1 1/2 in (22.9 m) in length,17 ft 7 1/2 in (5.4 m) in breadth, and 7 ft 6 1/2 in (2.3 m) in depth.)

On 26 February 1800, under Lieutenant Henry Stanley, Swan was on the Irish station. Here she captured the Uligeride Mercarius (Flying Mercurius), of Bremen, which Swan had detained while Uligeride Mercarius was on a passage to Bordeaux.

On 1 March 1801, while under the command of Acting Lieutenant John Luckraft, Swan captured the French privateer Vengeur in the Channel, one league southwest of Praule Point. Vengeur was under the command of M. Le Roy, mounted two large swivels, and had a crew of 17 men, one of whom was wounded. She was ten days out of St Malo but had taken nothing. Luckraft further reported on behalf of the owners that due to the bad weather he had had the misfortune to lose one of their cutter's best boats boarding the privateer.

Swan was under the command of Lieutenant Philip Browne from 26 February to 17 March 1802. During this period Swan intercepted and seized several notorious smugglers. Browne then transferred to the gun-brig Vixen in May.

On 26 October 1803 Swan sailed in company with four transports from Portsmouth to Plymouth. There they were to pick up troops for Cork. An agent for the Royal Navy, Captain Watson, accompanied them.

Under the command of Lieutenant William Richard Wallace she recaptured Jane on 25 January 1805. The next day she captured Fly (or Vlieg), a Danish privateer of 18 men that had captured Jane. (Note: The London Gazette gives the name of the privateer as Flip, which probably represents a miscopying, misreading, or mistranslating of the vessel's name.) On 19 March salvage arising from the recapture of Jane was due to be paid at Yarmouth, and on 28 May prize monies resulting from the capture of Fly were due to be paid on board.

On 10 May 1805 Swan was part of a squadron under Rear-Admiral Thomas McNamara Russell when the squadron captured the Dorothea Elizabeth.

Three French privateer luggers captured Swan off the Needles on 20 March 1807.

=== Prize money ===
On 18 May 1802 there was an announcement in the press that the proceeds arising from the capture of the Uligeride Mercarius would be due for payment at Dartmouth, or on Swan's next arrival there. On 24 February 1802 prize money resulting from the capture of the Drotchterland, Brooderschap, Helder, Venus, Minerva, and Hector was due to be paid. Lastly, between 17 November and 30 December, prize money resulting from the expedition to Holland was due for payment.

On 4 July 1802 orders were received at Portsmouth for Swan, among a number of other vessels including Bulldog and Serpent, to be put in commission. Serpent may have been Serpent, an ex-Dutch hoy of four guns, that the Navy had purchased in 1794 and sold in 1802. Bulldog may have been Bulldog, which had been a powder hulk in Portsmouth since her recapture in 1801, and which was broken up in 1829. As neither this Serpent nor Bulldog appear to have been recommissioned, this Swan may also have not, in which case she would not be the second Swan.

== Second hired armed cutter Swan ==
The second Swan was a cutter of ten 12-pounder carronades and 11927/94 tons burthen (bm) that served the Royal Navy from 3 August 1807 until the Danes captured her on 24 April 1811 during the Gunboat War. (Note: Anderson gives the day as 23 April, Winfield gives it as 24 April, and Gosset gives it as 25 April.)

During Swan's contract she was under the command of Lieutenant Mark Robinson Lucas.

On 24 August 1807, Swan captured the Haabet, Joost, Master.

On 24 May 1808 she found herself in action off the island of Bornholm with a Danish cutter-rigged vessel. Swan had been carrying despatches when she had spotted the Danish vessel and lured her out. After a chase of about two hours, Swan was in a position to open fire. Twenty minutes into the engagement the Danish cutter exploded. Swan suffered no casualties despite coming under fire both from the Danish vessel and the batteries on Bornholm. The fire from the batteries and the sighting of Danish boats approaching forced Wallace to withdraw without being able to make efforts to rescue survivors. The Danish cutter appeared to be of about 120 tons, to have mounted eight or ten guns, and apparently was full of men. The Danish cutter turned out to be the privateer Habet.

Four days later Swan captured the Danish brigs Emanuel and Aall. On 15 November 1808 Swan captured the Anna Dorothea.

Then Swan captured Constantine Pawlowitz on 4 August 1809.

Later in 1809 Lucas removed from Swan. In December 1809 Swan captured Friendschaff (5 December), Neptunus, and St. Johanna (10 December).

On 4 August 1810, Swan was under the command of Edward Mourilyan when she captured the Juliana Carolina. On 25 August Swan brought in to Hano Bay, Sweden, where Vice-Admiral Sir James Saumarez and his flagship Victory then were, a Danish privateer rowboat with 11 men, one of whom had been killed and another wounded in attempting to make their escape. Swan also brought in a galiot that she had recaptured.

On 6 January 1811 Swan was in Yarmouth for repairs, having had to cut away masts during a gale. On 19 April 1811, Swan captured Baron Rhanizen Lhen and Bellona. That same day she captured Lykkern Prove, Peterson, Master.

On 24 April 1811, Swan and hired armed cutter Hero anchored off Kungsholm; at 3am the next morning they saw three Danish gunboats in The Sleeve (Sunningesund), approaching them. The two British cutters cut their cables and attempted to escape. Shots from one of the gunboats damaged Swan and one shot resulted in the wetting of her powder magazine. As the wind died off, the gunboats concentrated on Swan, forcing her surrender. The Danes boarded her but were able to retrieve little before Swan sank off Uddevalla, on the Swedish coast north of Gothenburg. The fight cost Swan two men killed and one wounded. The same battle apparently also resulted in damage to Hero. (Note: Gosset has Hero being sunk, but does not report any court date. All other reports have Hero damaged, but continuing to serve until November 1811.)

== Swan Revenue cutters of Cowes ==
There were five successive Swan Revenue cutters, all of which were in the service of HM Collector of Customs at Cowes. More specifically, there was a Swan of 130 tons (bm) and fourteen 4-pounder guns under the command of Francis Sarmon which received a Letter of Marque on 25 February 1793. Although these Swans were primarily in the service of the Crown as Revenue "cruizers", in time of war the Admiralty periodically deployed the cutters for naval assignments, e.g. carrying despatches, reconnaissance, or as a transport.

In fact Francis Sarmon captained three of these Swans:

Swan I was converted for Revenue use in 1783 and brought into service (under the Revenue's contract system - the Collector being personally financially liable) but was wrecked later that year.

Swan II was built 1784. Francis took over as its captain from his brother George Sarmon in 1786; she was also wrecked (in 1792). The contract system was abolished in 1788 and financial responsibility was assumed by the Board of Customs.

Swan III was refitted by the Commissioners of Customs from a seized smuggling cutter in 1792 at London; three French frigates captured her on 14 October 1795 whilst she was carrying despatches for the Navy.

Swan IV (built 1796) was captured in an action against a French privateer on 14 December that same year. Francis Sarmon and two seamen were killed and her captors took Swan into Le Havre. (Note: Swan IV became the privateer Boulonnoise, out of Dunkirk. On 2 February 1799, HMS Ethalion was operating with HMS Anson when together they captured Boulonnoise, which had "greatly annoyed the trade in the North Sea".)

Swan V was launched in 1798, and was captured by three French privateer luggers on 20 March 1807. Swan V (commanded by William Ferris) was under Admiralty orders as a participant in the expedition to Holland in 1799. Swan V became the French privateer Indomptable. HMS Owen Glendower recaptured her in 1810. This vessel's actions in naval service are described in more detail under the section above "First hired armed cutter Swan". Following the capture of Swan V in 1807, the Collector of Customs in Cowes commissioned no further Swans.
