= Margaret Drummond (WRNS officer) =

British naval officer

Commandant Dame Margaret Drummond DBE
- Born: Edith Margaret Drummond; 4 September 1917; Kilmarnock, Ayrshire, Scotland
- Died: 21 April 1987 (aged 69)
- Military career
- Allegiance: United Kingdom
- Branch: Women's Royal Naval Service
- Service years: 1941–1967
- Rank: Commandant
- Commands: Women's Royal Naval Service (1964–1967)
- Conflicts: Second World War
- Awards: Dame Commander of the Order of the British Empire

Commandant Dame Edith Margaret Drummond, DBE (4 September 1917 – 21 April 1987) was a senior British naval officer who served as Director of the Women's Royal Naval Service (WRNS) from 1964 to 1967.

== Early life and education ==
Edith Margaret Drummond was born on 4 September 1917 in Kilmarnock, Ayrshire, Scotland to Professor Robert James Drummond and Marion (née Street) Drummond. She was educated at Park School, an all-girls private school in Glasgow, and studied at the University of Aberdeen, graduating with an undergraduate Master of Arts (MA Hons) degree in 1938.

== Military career ==
In April 1941, Drummond joined the Women's Royal Naval Service (WRNS) and served as a writer (equivalent in rank to able seaman). She was commissioned as a third officer (equivalent to sub-lieutenant) in October, with seniority from 25 September. She was promoted to second officer (equivalent to lieutenant) in October 1942, with seniority from 29 August 1942, and in early 1944 joined the staff of Commander-in-Chief, Plymouth. She was "responsible for the administration and paperwork relating to the command's role in operation Neptune": as such, she was the first woman to learn about the Normandy landings. In April 1944, she was made an acting first officer (equivalent to lieutenant commander) with seniority from 5 April; this promotion was confirmed in August.

After the Normandy landings, she was posted to India, where she worked as assistant secretary to its flag officer. Then, with promotion to superintendent (equivalent to captain), she joined the staff of Commander-in-Chief, East Indies Fleet.

Having returned to the United Kingdom, Drummond undertook a number of leadership posting: she served as the officer in charge of HMS Dauntless, the initial training establishment for the Women's Royal Naval Service, head of the WRNS officer training course at Royal Naval College, Greenwich, and Superintendent (training and drafting). Drummond was appointed an Officer of the Order of the British Empire in the 1960 New Year Honours. She was deputy director of the WRNS and then, from June 1964 to 1967, Director of the Women's Royal Naval Service. As director, she was granted the rank commandant (equivalent to commodore). Drummond was appointed an Honorary Aide-de-Camp to Queen Elizabeth II on 4 June 1964, and a Dame Commander of the Order of the British Empire in the 1965 New Year Honours. She retired in 1967.

Military offices
Preceded by Jean Davies	Director of the Women's Royal Naval Service; 1964–1967	Succeeded by Marion Kettlewell
