= Elizabeth Craig-McFeely =

Commandant Elizabeth Craig-McFeely CB
- Born: Elizabeth Sarah Ann Craig-McFeely; 27 April 1927 (age 99)
- Allegiance: United Kingdom
- Branch: Women's Royal Naval Service
- Service years: 1952–1982
- Rank: Commandant
- Spouses: Rear Admiral Colin Dunlop, RN (1995–2009; his death)

Commandant Elizabeth Craig-McFeely CB (born 27 April 1927), who served as Director of the Women's Royal Naval Service (WRNS) between 1979 and 1982, while also acting as aide-de-camp to Queen Elizabeth II.

== Career ==
Elizabeth Sarah Ann Craig-McFeely was born on 27 April 1927, the daughter of Lieutenant colonel Cecil Michael Craig-McFeely. She attended the University of London where she gained a diploma in Physical Education. Initially a PE teacher, she joined the Women's Royal Naval Service (WRNS) in 1952. In 1953, she was posted to various Royal Navy, Royal Marines and Royal Navy Reserve establishments until 1967, including the Royal Navy Supply School between 1964 and 1966.

Craig-McFeely commanded the WRNS in the Far Eastern Fleet between 1967 and 1969. She then worked directly for the Ministry of Defence (Navy), 1969–1974, and at the shore establishment HMS Centurion until 1976 (Centurion is a Ministry of Defence-owned establishment in Gosport, Hampshire, mainly responsible for personnel).

In 1977, she was made Superintendent of the WRNS, becoming Director (equivalent to Rear-Admiral) between 1979 and 1982. While holding this post, she was an honorary aide-de-camp to Queen Elizabeth II.

Craig-McFeely retired from active service in 1982, and was named a Companion to the Order of the Bath. She was succeeded as Director of the WRNS by Commandant Patricia Swallow on 30 July 1982.

== Personal life ==
In 1995, she married Rear Admiral Colin Dunlop, RN. He had been her commanding officer while at the Royal Navy Supply School. Dunlop died in 2009, aged 91.
