= Elizabeth Hoyer-Millar =

British naval officer

Commandant Dame Elizabeth Hoyer-Millar DBE DL
- Hoyer-Millar in 1960
- Born: Evelyn Louisa Elizabeth Hoyer-Millar; 17 December 1910
- Died: 26 February 1984 (aged 73)
- Military career
- Allegiance: United Kingdom
- Branch: Women's Royal Naval Service
- Service years: 1941–1960
- Rank: Commandant
- Commands: Women's Royal Naval Service
- Conflicts: Second World War
- Awards: Dame Commander of the Order of the British Empire

Dame Evelyn Louisa Elizabeth Hoyer-Millar, DBE, DL (17 December 1910 – 26 February 1984) was a British naval officer who served as Commandant of the Women's Royal Naval Service from 1958 to 1960.

== Naval career ==
Hoyer-Millar (from a Scottish family, related to the Barons Inchyra), the daughter of Robert Christian Hoyer-Millar (or Hoyer Millar) and Muriel Rosa Lillian (née Foster) Hoyer-Millar, served in the Voluntary Aid Detachment (VAD) 1939–41, then joined the Women's Royal Naval Service (WRNS) in 1942. She was commissioned as a second officer (equivalent to lieutenant) in 1943, and later was in charge of the first party of WRNS to land in Normandy.

Hoyer-Millar was promoted to first officer then, in 1945, to acting chief officer (equivalent to commander). She was superintendent (captain) of the Air branch and then the Training branch of the WRNS before becoming commandant of the WRNS 1958–60. She was appointed an Officer of the Order of the British Empire in the 1952 New Year Honours, and Dame Commander of the Order of the British Empire in the 1960 Birthday Honours. She retired to Scotland and was appointed a Deputy Lieutenant of the County of Angus in 1971.

== Later life ==
In 1960, Hoyer-Millar was among six distinguished women at a Women of the Year Lunch who were asked "If you were not yourself, who would you like to be?" Hoyer-Millar said that she would like to have been Helen of Troy. "Lady Hamilton I rather obviously considered," she said, "but I think my career might have been less successful and happy had I had the interests and desires that brought her to fame." Hoyer-Millar died on 26 February 1984, aged 73.
