= Women's Royal Naval Service =

Former women's branch of the British navy

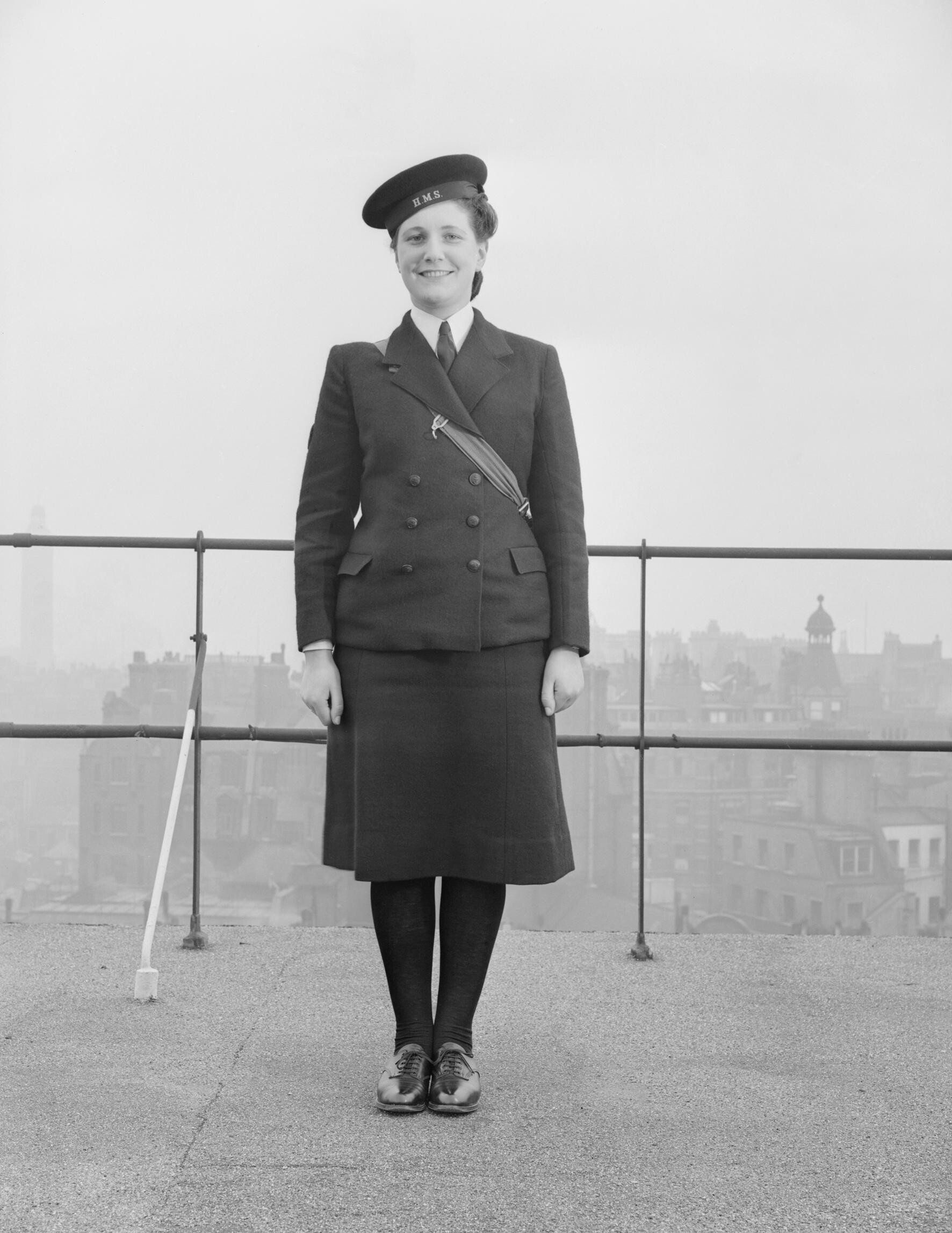
A WRNS rating during the Second World War

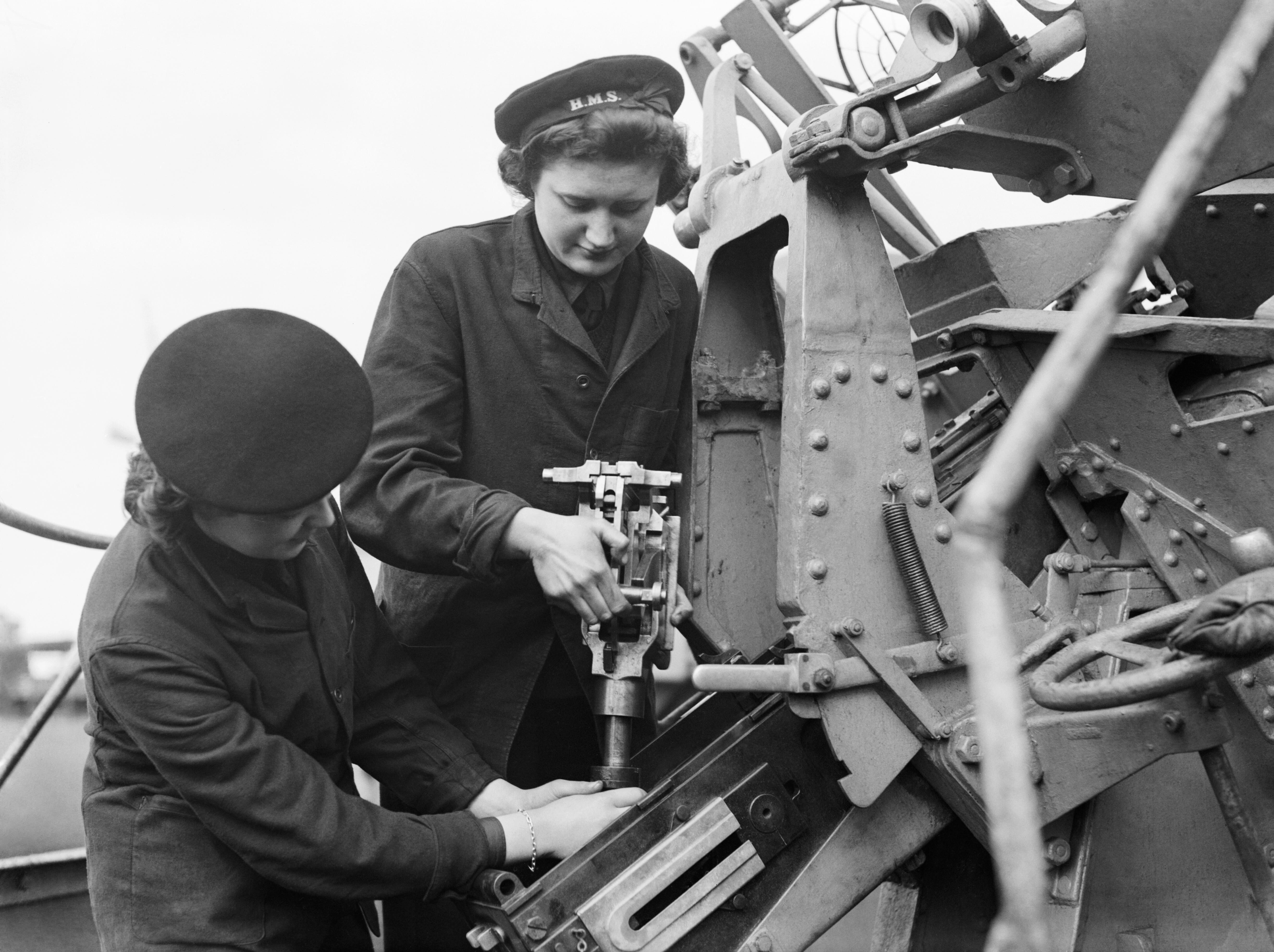
Two Ordnance Wrens in Liverpool reassemble a section of a pom-pom gun during the Second World War.

The Women's Royal Naval Service (WRNS; popularly and officially known as the Wrens) was the women's branch of the United Kingdom's Royal Navy. First formed in 1917 for the First World War, it was disbanded in 1919, then revived in 1939 at the beginning of the Second World War, remaining active until integrated into the Royal Navy in 1993. WRNS included cooks, clerks, wireless telegraphists, radar plotters, weapons analysts, range assessors, electricians, air mechanics, ground transport vehicle drivers and motorcycle dispatch riders.

== History ==
=== First World War ===
The WRNS was formed in 1917 during the First World War. On 10 October 1918, nineteen-year-old Josephine Carr from Cork became the first Wren to die on active service, when her ship, the RMS Leinster was torpedoed. By the end of the war the service had 5,500 members, 500 of them officers. In addition, 2,867 Wrens, 46 officers and 2,821 other ranks who had previously supported the Royal Naval Air Service chose to be transferred to the RAF Royal Air Force. The WRNS was disbanded in 1919.

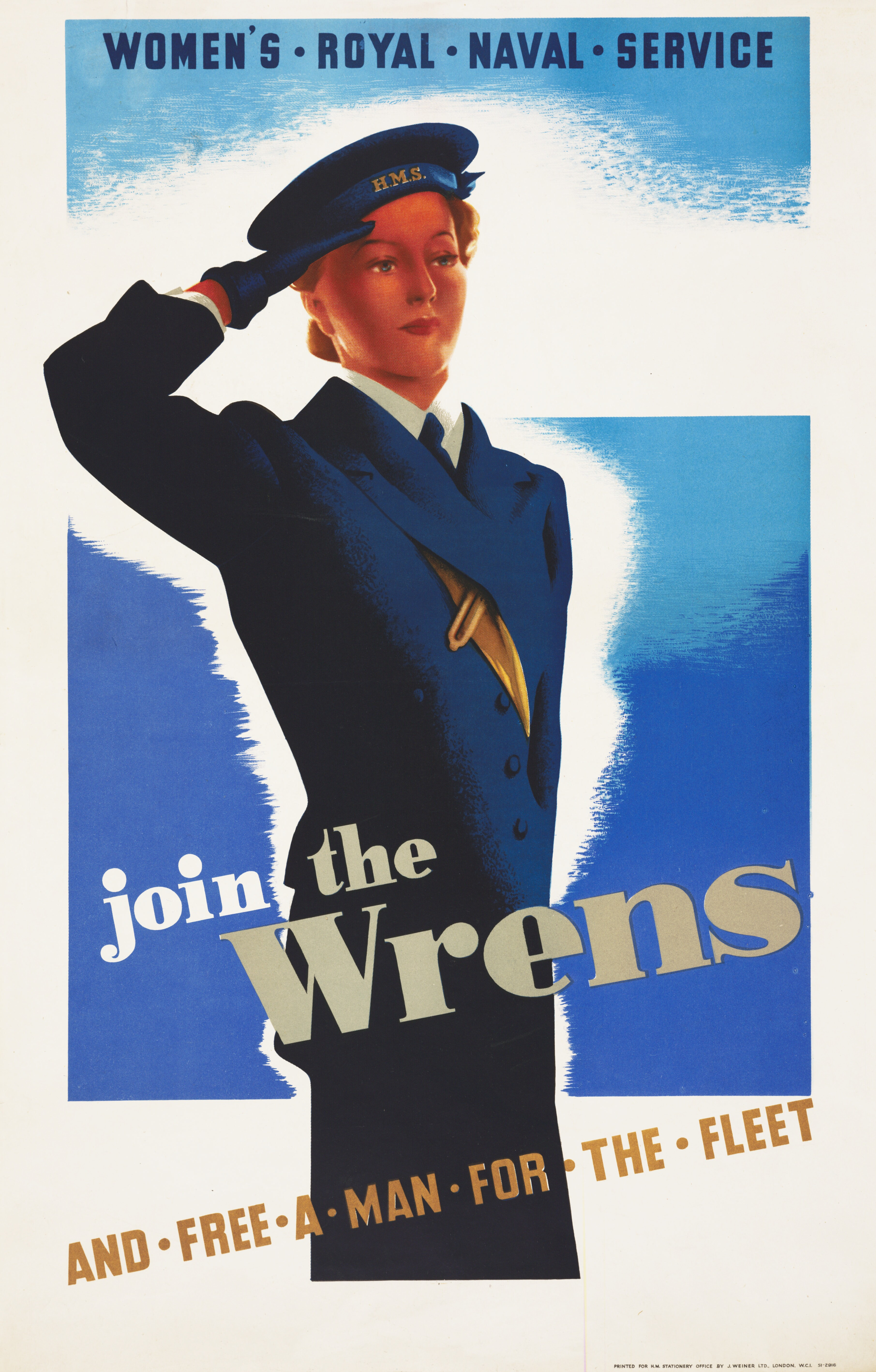
Second World War recruitment poster

=== Second World War ===
At the beginning of the Second World War, Vera Laughton Mathews was appointed as the director of the re-formed WRNS in 1939 with Ethel (Angela) Goodenough as her deputy. The WRNS had an expanded list of allowable activities, including flying transport planes. At its peak in 1944 it had 75,000 active servicewomen. During the war 102 WRNS members were killed in action and 22 wounded in action. One of the slogans used in recruitment posters was "Join the Wrens and free a man for the Fleet".

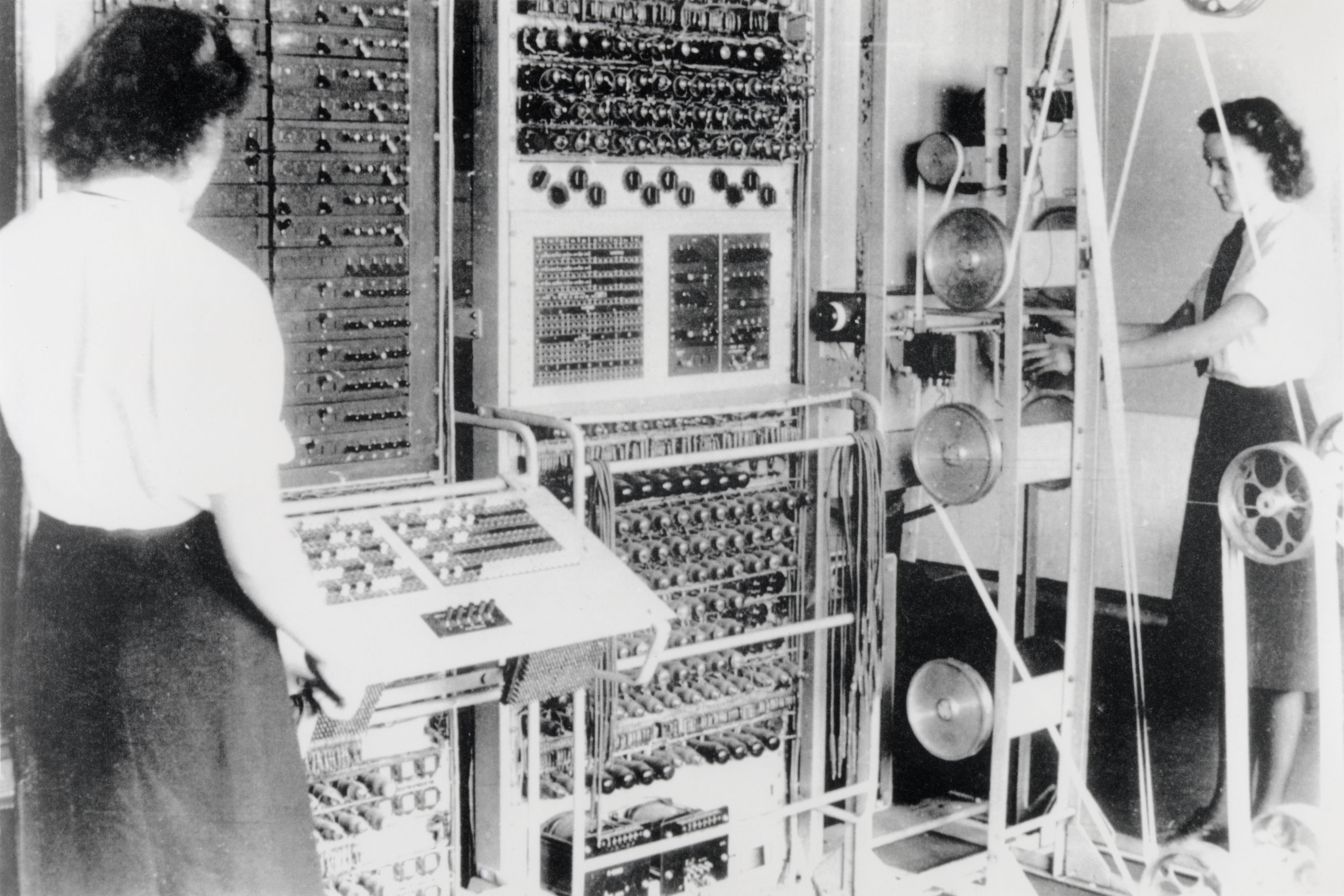
A Mark 2 Colossus computer operated by Wrens.

Wrens were prominent as support staff at the Government Code and Cypher School at Bletchley Park; they were the direct operators of the bombes and Colossus used to break Axis codes and cyphers.

=== Post-war era ===
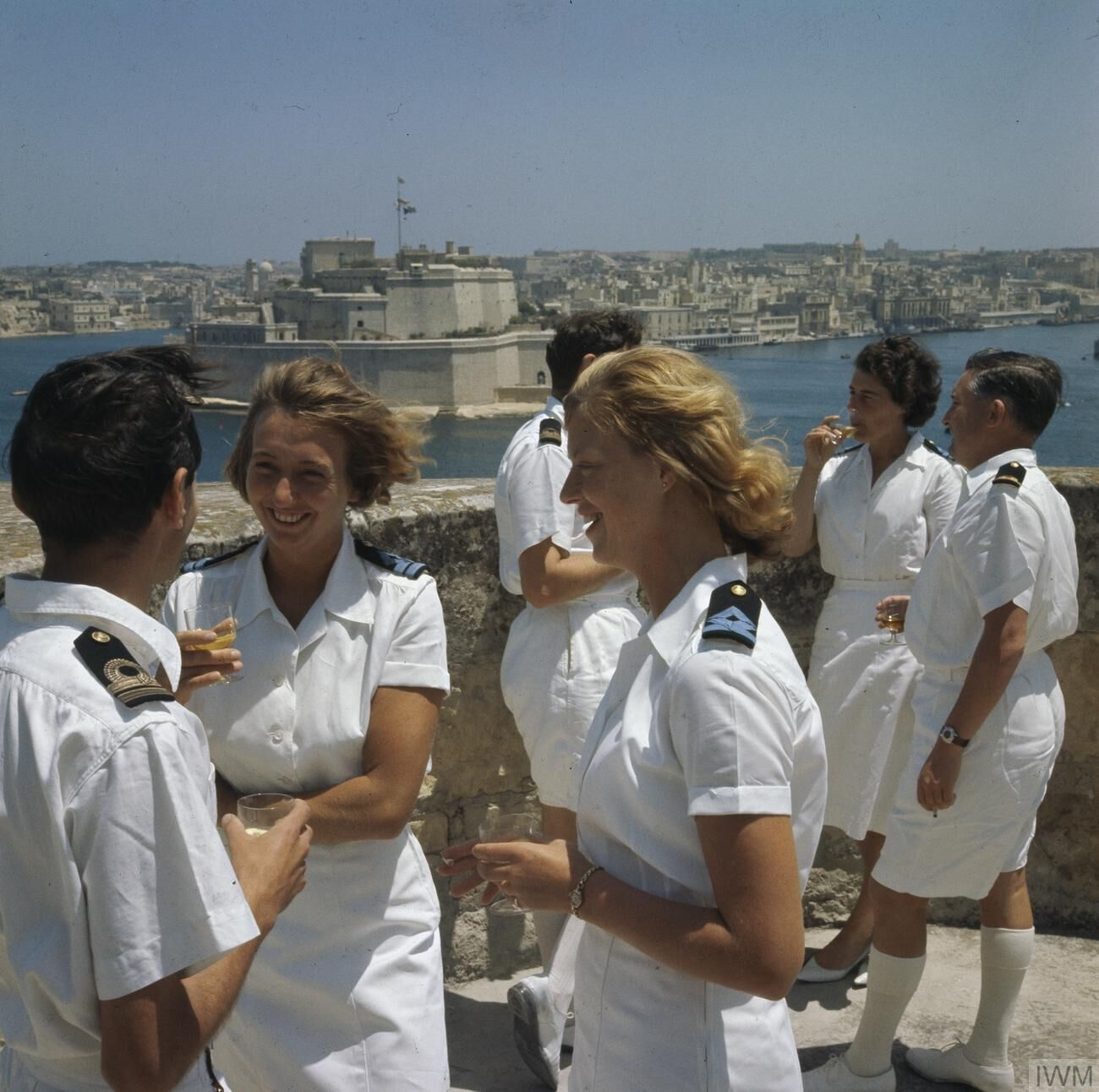
RN and WRNS officers enjoying evening drinks by the Grand Harbour in Malta, 1964.

The WRNS remained in existence after the end of the war although Mathews retired in 1947 and Goodenough had died the year before. In the 1970s it became obvious that equal pay for women and the need to remove sexual discrimination meant that the WRNS and the Royal Navy would become one organisation. The key change was that women would become subject to the Naval Discipline Act 1957. Vonla McBride, who had experience in human resource management, became the Director of the WRNS in 1976, and members of the WRNS were subject to the same discipline as men by the next year.

In October 1990, during the Gulf War, HMS Brilliant carried the first women officially to serve on an operational warship. That same year, Chief Officer Pippa Duncan became the first WRNS officer to command a Royal Navy shore establishment. The WRNS was finally integrated into the Royal Navy in 1993, when women were allowed to serve on board navy vessels as full members of the crew. Female sailors are still informally known by the nicknames "wrens" or "Jennies" ("Jenny Wrens") in naval slang.

Before 1993, all women in the Royal Navy were members of the WRNS except nurses, who joined (and still join) Queen Alexandra's Royal Naval Nursing Service, and medical and dental officers, who were commissioned directly into the Royal Navy, held RN ranks, and wore WRNS uniform with gold RN insignia.

A series of exhibits on the history of the WRNS are part of the Western Approaches Museum in Liverpool.

== Ranks and insignia ==
The WRNS had its own ranking system, which it retained until amalgamation into the Royal Navy in 1993.

=== Officers ===
Flag officers	Field officers	Junior officers
United Kingdom (1917–1919)
Director	Deputy Director	Assistant Director	Deputy Assistant Director	Divisional Director	Deputy Divisional Director	Principal	Deputy Principal	Assistant Principal
Women's Royal Naval Service
(1939–1940)	Director	Deputy director	Superintendent	Chief officer	First officer	Second officer
(1941–1945)	Superintendent	Chief officer	First officer	Second officer	Third officer
Women's Royal Naval Service (1946–1951)
Commandant	Director	Superintendent	Chief officer	First officer	Second officer	Third officer
Women's Royal Naval Service (1951–1993)
Chief commandant (Note: Honorary rank held by a member of the royal family. Until 1951, the position was called Commandant, but was renamed in that year due to the introduction of Commandant as the rank for the Director WRNS. Princess Marina, Duchess of Kent was Commandant, and later Chief Commandant, from 1940 until her death in 1968. She was succeeded by Princess Anne, who held the appointment from 1974 until 1993, when she became Chief Commandant for Women, Royal Navy; she now holds the honorary rank of admiral.)	Commandant (Note: Until 1951, Director was both a position and a rank. In 1951, the rank of Commandant was introduced for the officer holding the position of Director. Director equated to Rear-Admiral until 1946, when it was reduced to Commodore. In common with RN Commodores, after 1946 Director/Commandant was only an appointment and not a true rank and the Directors continued to hold the substantive rank of Superintendent.)	Superintendent	Chief officer	First officer	Second officer	Third officer
NATO code	OF-10	OF-9	OF-8	OF-7	OF-6	OF-5	OF-4	OF-3	OF-2	OF-1

=== Ratings ===
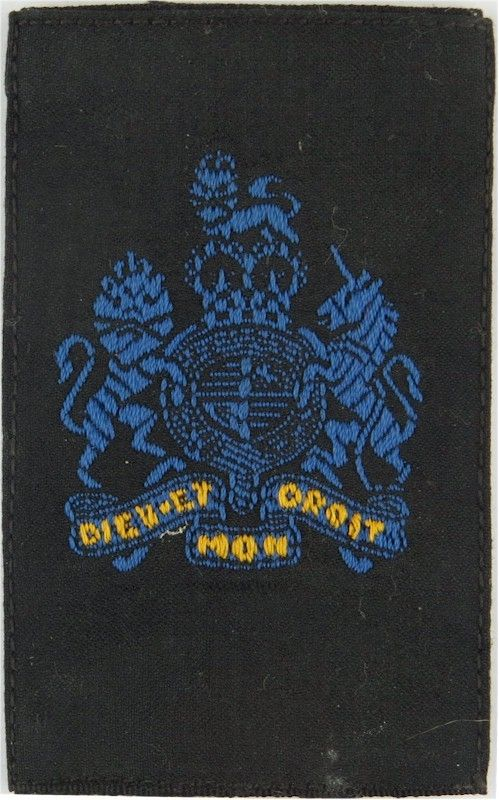
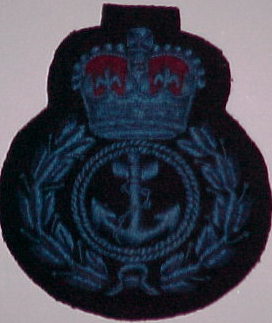
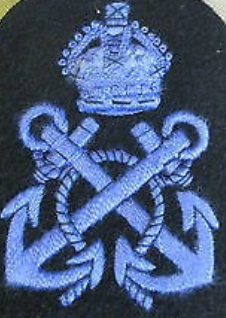
Rank group	Senior NCOs					Junior NCOs		Ratings
(United Kingdom) Women's Royal Naval Service (1917–1919)
(United Kingdom) Women's Royal Naval Service (1917–1919)			Chief Section Leader	Section Leader		Leader		Wren	Ordinary Wren
(United Kingdom) Women's Royal Naval Service (1939–1952)
(United Kingdom) Women's Royal Naval Service (1939–1952)			Chief Wren	Petty Officer Wren		Leading Wren		Wren	Ordinary Wren
(United Kingdom) Women's Royal Naval Service (1953–1993)
(United Kingdom) Women's Royal Naval Service (1953–1993)	Warrant Officer Wren (Note: Introduced in 1970 as Fleet Chief Petty Officer Wren. Renamed in 1985 as Warrant Officer Wren.)		Chief Wren	Petty Officer Wren		Leading Wren		Wren	Ordinary Wren
NATO code	OR-9	OR-8	OR-7	OR-6	OR-5	OR-4	OR-3	OR-2	OR-1

Ratings' titles were suffixed with their trade (e.g. Leading Wren Cook, Chief Wren Telegraphist).

Wrens wore the same rank insignia as their male equivalents, but in blue instead of gold. The "curls" atop officers' rank stripes were diamond-shaped instead of circular.

== Uniforms ==
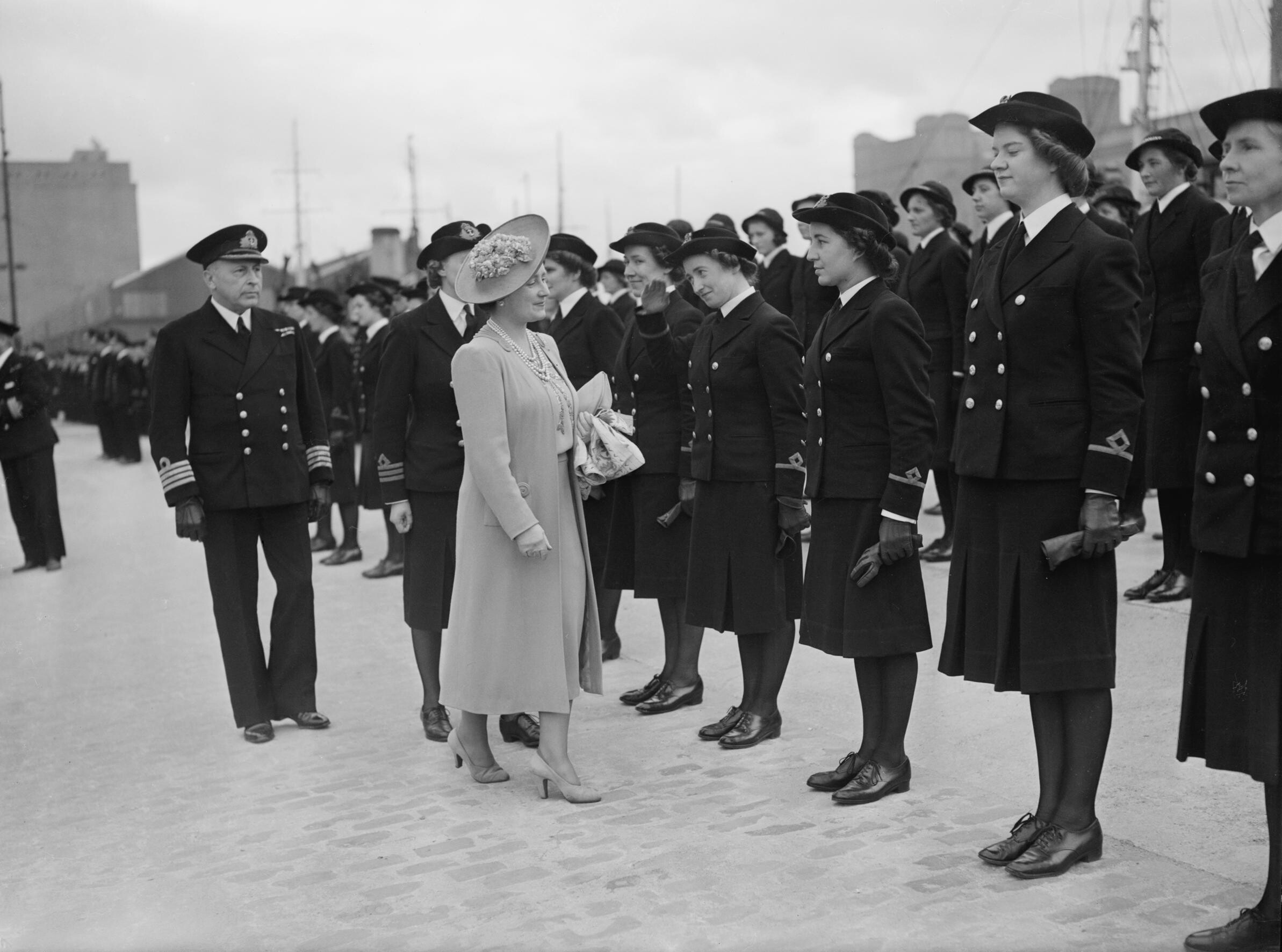
Queen Elizabeth inspecting a detachment of Wrens in Belfast, 1942

From 1939, Wren uniform, designed by leading British fashion designer Edward Molyneux, consisted of a double-breasted jacket and skirt, with shirt and tie, for all ranks (although similar working dress to the men could also be worn). Junior Ratings wore hats similar to those of their male counterparts (although with a more sloping top). Senior Ratings (Petty Officers and above) and officers wore tricorne hats. In tropical areas these had a white cover. All insignia, including cap badges and non-substantive (trade) badges, were blue.

== List of directors ==
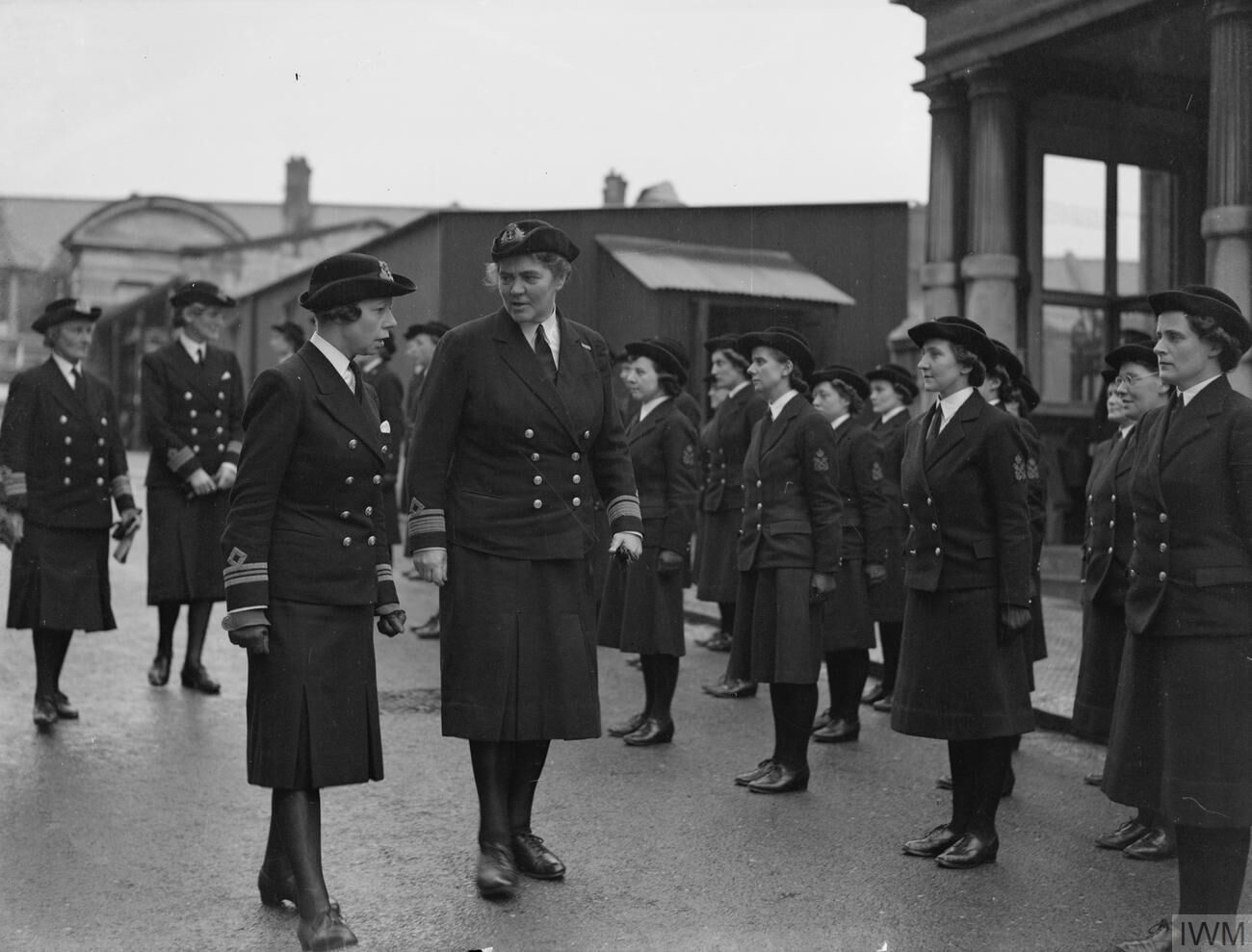
Vera Laughton Mathews inspecting Chief and Petty Officer WRNS

- Dame Katharine Furse, 1917–1919
- Dame Vera Laughton Mathews, 1939–1946
- Dame Jocelyn Woollcombe, 1946–1950
- Commandant Dame Mary Lloyd, 1950–1954
- Commandant Dame Nancy Robertson, 1954–1958
- Commandant Dame Elizabeth Hoyer-Millar, 1958–1960
- Commandant Dame Jean Davies, 1961–1964
- Commandant Dame Margaret Drummond, 1964–1967
- Commandant Dame Marion Kettlewell, 1967–1970
- Commandant Daphne Blundell, 1970–1973
- Commandant Mary Talbot, 1973–1976
- Commandant Vonla McBride, 1976–1979
- Commandant Elizabeth Craig-McFeely, 1979–1982
- Commandant Patricia Swallow, 1982–1985
- Commandant Marjorie Fletcher, 1985–1988
- Commandant Anthea Larken, 1988–1991
- Commandant Anne Spencer, 1991–1993

== See also ==
- Auxiliary Territorial Service
- Eswyn Lyster
- National Association of Training Corps for Girls
- Operation Outward
- Women in the World Wars
- Women's Royal Air Force (World War One)
- Women's Auxiliary Air Force
- Women's Royal Air Force
- Women's Royal Army Corps
- Military ranks of women's services in WWII
