= HMS Dauntless (1808) =

Sloop of the Royal Navy

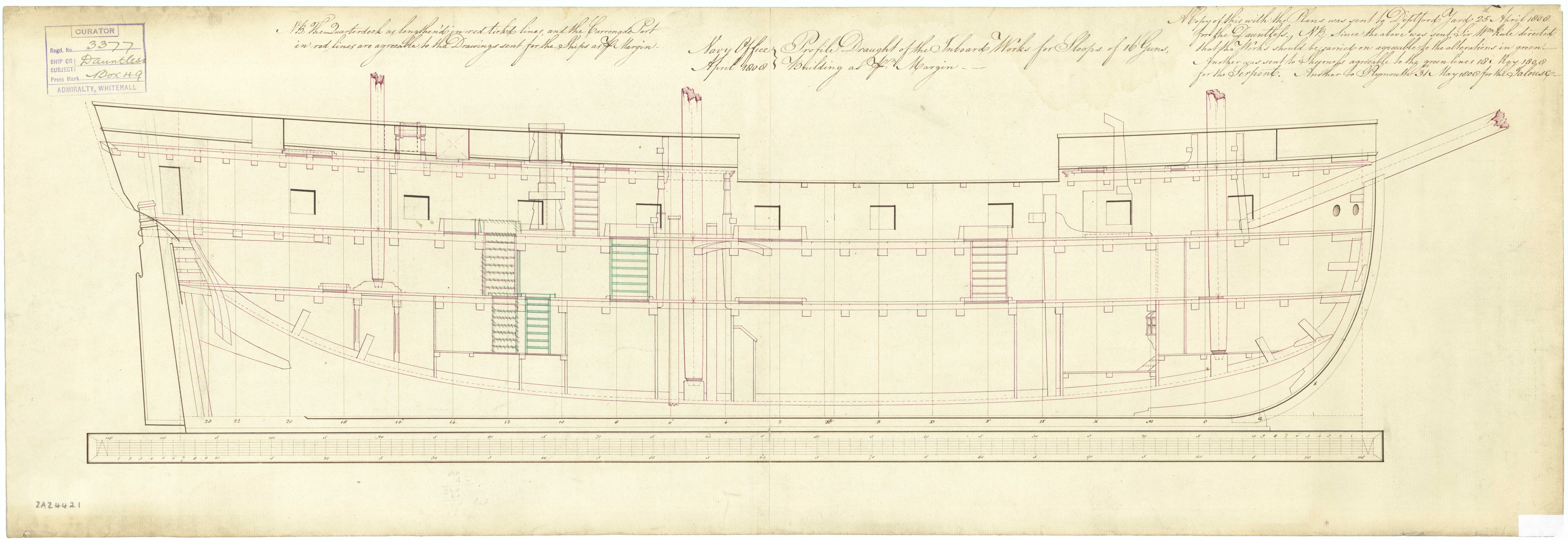
- Dauntless

History

United Kingdom
- Name: HMS Dauntless
- Builder: Deptford Dockyard
- Launched: 20 December 1808
- Commissioned: July 1809
- Decommissioned: October 1823
- Fate: Sold 1825

General characteristics
- Class & type: Cormorant-class ship-sloop
- Tons burthen: 42266/94 (bm)
- Length: 108 ft 4 in (33.02 m) (overall); 90 ft 9 5/8 in (27.676 m) (keel)
- Beam: 29 ft 7 in (9.02 m)
- Depth of hold: 9 ft (2.7 m)
- Sail plan: Ship
- Complement: 121
- Armament: 16 × 32-pounder carronades; 8 × 18-pounder carronades; 2 × 6-pounder bow chasers

The second HMS Dauntless was a Cormorant-class ship-sloop of the Royal Navy, launched in 1808. She was sold in 1823.

== Construction ==
Dauntless was built in Deptford Dockyard as a Cormorant-class ship-sloop.

== War service ==
She was launched on 20 December 1808 and commissioned in July 1809 under Commander Josiah Wittman. Her first service was in November 1809, when she escorted a convoy to the African coast. Wittman died in January 1810. His replacement, in May 1810, was Commander Daniel Barber.

She returned in early 1810 and on 15 June sailed for Archangel. In the autumn of 1811 she was sent to the Cork Station. she remained on the Irish station in 1812 and 1813.

Still, on 16 May 1812, Dauntless arrived at Portsmouth from Jamaica. She had left there on 31 March, escorting a convoy of 32 vessels. On 29 April she parted from them at 35°15′N 56°58′W in a gale.

On 3 December 1813 a gale dismasted the transport Phoenix, Heller, master, at 46°2′N 9°9′W as she was sailing from Portsmouth to the Cape of good Hope. Dauntless came upon Phoenix on 5 December and took her in tow, arriving at Plymouth on 18 December. Also on 6 December, Dauntless came upon Renown, Mait, master, at 45°19′N 9°54′W, also dismasted. Barber had to leave Renown as Dauntless was towing Phoenix. However, Renown, which had been sailing from London to Bahia, was able to make her way to The Downs.

After refitting at Portsmouth in early 1814 she served on the Newfoundland Station. On 22 May Dauntless and Cyane were in company when they recaptured Aeolus. (Note: A first-class share of the salvage, as remitted from Newfoundland, was worth £66 7s 9d; a sixth-class share, that of an ordinary seaman, was worth £1 3s 9d.)

Dauntless shared in the proceeds of the capture, between 29 November and 19 December 1814, of the schooner Mary and the transports Lloyd and Abeona. (Note: A first-class share of the prize money was worth £26 15s 10½d; a sixth-class share was worth 6s 1½d.)

On 7 February 1815, a party of American militia captured a tender to Dauntless near St James Island, in Chesapeake Bay. The tender was armed with one 12-pounder carronade and some swivel guns, and had a crew of 19 men under the command of a lieutenant.

In December 1815, as the Navy contracted after the end of the Napoleonic Wars, she went into Ordinary.

== Post-war ==
Between June 1818 and February 1819 Dauntless underwent repairs and fitting out at Portsmouth. In November 1818, she was recommissioned under Commander Valentine Gardner for service in the East Indies.

Over the next five years, Dauntless visited China, New Zealand, South America, the Pacific archipelagos and New South Wales. Valentine died in November 1820. His replacement was Commander John Norman Campbell (acting). Captain George Gambier assumed command in June 1821.

On 14 August 1821 local inhabitants massacred 10 of the 12 men in a landing party from the whaler Coquette at Hanamenu on the island of Hiva Oa in the Marquesas Islands. The landing party had the misfortune to arrive as a local war commenced and one side assumed they were enemy. Gambier and Dauntless were sent to investigate and exact reprisals.

In company with members of the Philosophical Society of Australasia fixed a suitably engraved bronze tablet on a "beetling rock" on the south head of Botany Bay to commemorate the first landing of Captain James Cook and Sir Joseph Banks in Australia in 1770. The tablet has not been seen for some years. Dauntless sailed through Torres Strait to Trincomalee to rejoin the fleet, and returned to Portsmouth to pay off in October 1823.

== Fate ==
The Principal Officers and Commissioners of His Majesty's Navy offered Dauntless for sale on 27 January 1825. She sold on that day to Thomas Smith for £2,330.
