= Cormorant-class ship-sloop =

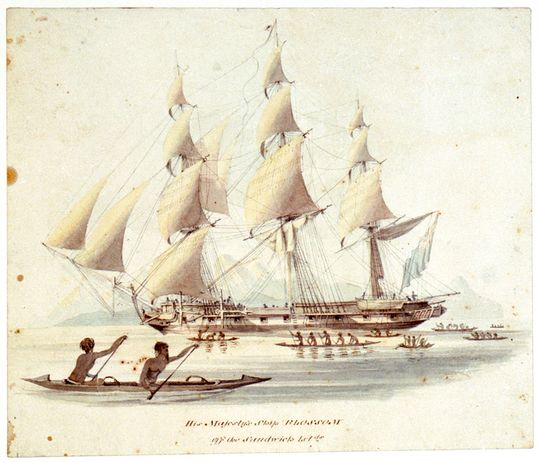
- His Majesty's ship Blossom off the Sandwich Islands

Class overview
- Name: Cormorant class
- Operators: Royal Navy
- Built: 1793–1817
- In service: 1794–1833
- Completed: 30
- Canceled: 1

General characteristics
- Type: Ship sloop
- Tons burthen: 422.7 bm
- Length: 108 ft 4 in (33 m) (gundeck); 90 ft 9.625 in (28 m) (keel)
- Beam: 29 ft 7 in (9 m)
- Depth of hold: 9 ft 0 in (2.74 m)
- Sail plan: Full-rigged ship
- Complement: 125 (121 from 1794)
- Armament: First group as built: Sixteen 6-pounder long guns; Later: Sixteen 24-pounder carronades; Eight 12-pounder carronades; Second group: Sixteen 32-pounder carronades; Eight 18-pounder carronades; Two 6-pounder

The Cormorant class were built as a class of 16-gun ship sloops for the Royal Navy, although they were re-rated as 18-gun ships soon after completion.

== Design ==
The two Surveyors of the Navy – Sir William Rule and Sir John Henslow – jointly designed the class. A notation on the back of the plans held at the National Maritime Museum, Greenwich, states that the designers based their plan on the lines of the captured French sloop Amazon, captured in 1745.

The Admiralty ordered six vessels to this design in February 1793; it ordered a seventh vessel in the following year. These ships were initially armed with sixteen 6-pounder guns, later supplemented with eight 12-pounder carronades (6 on the quarterdeck and 2 on the forecastle). The 6-pounder guns were eventually replaced by 24-pounder carronades.

Twenty-four more ships of the same design were ordered in 1805–1806. However, in this new batch 32-pounder carronades were fitted instead of the 6-pounder guns originally mounted in the earlier batch; the 12-pounder carronades were replaced by 18-pounders, and some ships also received two 6-pounders as chase guns on the forecastle.

Of this second batch one ship (Serpent) was cancelled and another (Ranger) completed to a slightly lengthened variant of the design.

== Ships ==
=== Batch 1 (with 6-pounder guns) ===
Name	Ordered	Builder	Launched	Fate
Cormorant	18 February 1793	Randall & Brent, Rotherhithe	2 January 1794	Blew up by accident on 24 December 1796
Favourite (i)	18 February 1793	Randall & Brent, Rotherhithe	1 February 1794	Captured by the French 6 January 1806; retaken 27 January 1807 and renamed Goree; broken up in 1817,
Hornet	18 February 1793	Marmaduke Stalkart, Rotherhithe	3 February 1794	Sold on 30 October 1817
Lynx (see Note 1)	18 February 1793	William Cleverly, Gravesend	14 February 1794	Sold on 28 April 1813
Lark	18 February 1793	Thomas Pitcher, Northfleet	15 February 1794	Foundered on 3 August 1809
Hazard	18 February 1793	Josiah & Thomas Brindley, Frindsbury	3 March 1794	Sold on 30 October 1817
Stork	6 November 1794	Deptford Royal Dockyard	29 November 1794	Sold on 30 May 1816

- Note 1: Lynx caused an international incident in 1795 when she fired on USRC Eagle.

=== Batch 2 (with 32-pounder carronades) ===
Name	Ordered	Builder	Launched	Fate
Hyacinth	12 July 1805	John Preston, Great Yarmouth	30 August 1806	Broken up in December 1820
Sabrina	12 July 1805	Robert Adams, Chapel, Southampton	1 September 1806	Sold on 18 April 1816
Herald	12 July 1805	Carver & Corney, Littlehampton	27 December 1806	Broken up in September 1817
Anacreon	12 July 1805	Plymouth Royal Dockyard (see Note 2)	1 May 1813	Foundered with all hands on 28 February 1814
Rosamund	4 October 1805	Simon Temple, South Shields	27 January 1807	Sold on 14 December 1815
Fawn	19 October 1805	Thomas Owen, Topsham	22 April 1806	Sold on 20 August 1818
Myrtle	19 October 1805	Richard Chapman, Bideford	2 October 1807	Broken up in June 1818
Acorn	19 October 1805	George Crocker, Bideford	30 October 1807	Broken up in May 1819
Racoon	19 October 1805	John Preston, Great Yarmouth	30 March 1808	Convict prison ship in 1819; sold in August 1838
North Star	19 October 1805	John Cock, Dartmouth (see Note 3)	21 April 1810	Sold 6 March 1817
Hesper	19 October 1805	John Cock, Dartmouth (see Note 3)	3 July 1809	Sold 8 July 1817
Cherub	19 November 1805	John King, Dover	27 December 1806	Sold on 13 January 1820
Minstrel	19 November 1805	Nicholas Bools & William Good, Bridport	25 March 1807	Sold 6 March 1817
Wanderer	19 November 1805	James Betts, Mistleythorn	29 September 1806	Sold 6 March 1817; became a whaling ship and then merchantman on the North Atlantic before her crew abandoned her in October 1827 as she was in a sinking state.
Sapphire	19 November 1805	Josiah & Thomas Brindley, Frindsbury	11 November 1806	Sold 18 April 1822
Blossom	19 November 1805	Robert Guillaume, Northam, Southampton	10 December 1806	Broken up in August 1848
Partridge	19 November 1805	John Avery, Dartmouth	15 July 1809	Broken up in September 1816
Egeria	19 November 1805	Nicholas Bools & William Good, Bridport	31 October 1807	Receiving ship at Devonport from 1825; broken up 1864
Favourite (ii)	30 November 1805	Jabez Bayley, Ipswich	13 September 1806	Broken up in February 1821
Tweed	30 November 1805	Thomas Iremonger, Littlehampton	10 January 1807	Wrecked off Newfoundland 5 November 1813
Ranger (see Note 4)	30 November 1805	Richard Thorne, Fremington, Barnstaple	5 September 1807	Broken up in February 1814.
Jalouse	15 January 1806	Plymouth Royal Dockyard	13 July 1809	Sold 8 March 1819
Serpent	15 January 1806	Sheerness Royal Dockyard	not laid down	Cancelled 8 September 1810
Dauntless	25 March 1806	Deptford Royal Dockyard	20 December 1808	Sold for breaking on 27 January 1825

- Note 2: The initial contractor for Anacreon, Owen of Ringmore, Devon, went bankrupt in 1810, so work was transferred to Plymouth Dockyard.
- Note 3: The initial contractor for North Star and Hesper, Benjamin Tanner of Dartmouth, went bankrupt in 1807 and the two contracts were transferred to John Cock.
- Note 4: Ranger was altered on stocks and completed to a slightly longer design, being 111¼ ft on the gundeck.
