= List of shipwrecks in 1808 =

The list of shipwrecks in 1808 includes ships sunk, wrecked or otherwise lost during 1808.

table of contents
1808
Jan	Feb	Mar	Apr
May	Jun	Jul	Aug
Sep	Oct	Nov	Dec
Unknown date

== January ==
=== 1 January ===
List of shipwrecks: 1 January 1808
Ship	State	Description
Barrett	United Kingdom	The ship was holed by an anchor and sank at Falmouth, Jamaica.
Brisk	United Kingdom	The ship sprang a leak and was abandoned by her crew. She was on a voyage from London to Africa.
Jenny	United Kingdom	The sloop collided with a brig off Great Yarmouth, Norfolk, and was abandoned by her crew. She was then driven ashore. Jenny was on a voyage from Boston, Lincolnshire, to London.
Leighton	United Kingdom	The ship was wrecked on the Isle of Skye. Her crew were rescued. She was on a voyage from Quebec, British North America, to Portsmouth, Hampshire.
Lucena	United States	The ship foundered in the Atlantic Ocean off Cape Trafalgar, Spain. She was on a voyage from Philadelphia, Pennsylvania, to Lisbon, Portugal.

=== 2 January ===
List of shipwrecks: 2 January 1808
Ship	State	Description
Marlborough	United Kingdom	The ship was driven ashore and wrecked on Barbados.

=== 3 January ===
List of shipwrecks: 3 January 1808
Ship	State	Description
Mars	United Kingdom	The ship departed from Savannah, Georgia, United States, for London. No further trace, presumed foundered with the loss of all hands.
Melantho	United Kingdom	The brig was driven ashore and wrecked between Falsterbo, Sweden, and Møn, Denmark.

=== 4 January ===
List of shipwrecks: 4 January 1808
Ship	State	Description
Spy	United Kingdom	The ship foundered in the Atlantic Ocean. Her crew were rescued by Hannah (United Kingdom). Spy was on a voyage from Jamaica to London.

=== 5 January ===
List of shipwrecks: 5 January 1808
Ship	State	Description
Henrietta	Sweden	The ship ran aground in the Vlie. She was on a voyage from Stockholm to London, United Kingdom.
Mary	United Kingdom	The ship was driven ashore at Orfordness, Suffolk. She was on a voyage from Great Yarmouth, Norfolk, to London.

=== 7 January ===
List of shipwrecks: 7 January 1808
Ship	State	Description
Unnamed	United Kingdom	The brig was driven ashore and wrecked at Plymouth Hoe, Devon.

=== 8 January ===
List of shipwrecks: 8 January 1808
Ship	State	Description
America	United States	The ship was driven ashore in the Saltee Islands, County Donegal, United Kingdom. She was on a voyage from Savannah, Georgia, to Liverpool, Lancashire, United Kingdom.
Choice	United Kingdom	The ship foundered in the Irish Sea off Wicklow. She was on a voyage from Liverpool, Lancashire, to Haiti.

=== 9 January ===
List of shipwrecks: 9 January 1808
Ship	State	Description
Crawford	United States	The ship was driven ashore on Heligoland. She was on a voyage from Philadelphia, Pennsylvania, to Amsterdam, North Holland, Kingdom of Holland.

=== 10 January ===
List of shipwrecks: 10 January 1808
Ship	State	Description
Robert	United Kingdom	The sloop ran aground on the Glenstokan Rocks, off Colvend, Kirkcudbrightshire, and was wrecked. Her crew were rescued.
Robert Bollon	United Kingdom	The ship foundered in the Gulf of Mexico (27°10′N 87°00′W). Her crew survived. She was on a voyage from Liverpool, Lancashire, to Savannah, Georgia, United States.

=== 11 January ===
List of shipwrecks: 11 January 1808
Ship	State	Description
John	United Kingdom	The ship foundered in Sheephaven Bay. She was on a voyage from Liverpool, Lancashire, to Galway.

=== 13 January ===
List of shipwrecks: 13 January 1808
Ship	State	Description
Provestein	Flag unknown	The ship was driven ashore at Falmouth, Cornwall, United Kingdom. She was later refloated.
Success	United Kingdom	The brig was driven ashore at Portsmouth, Hampshire.

=== 14 January ===
List of shipwrecks: 14 January 1808
Ship	State	Description
Agincourt	United Kingdom	The ship was driven ashore at Cowes, Isle of Wight. She was later refloated.
Alexander	Sweden	The ship was driven ashore at Liverpool, Lancashire, United Kingdom.
Anges	United Kingdom	The transport ship was driven ashore at Cowes. She was later refloated.
Argo	United Kingdom	The ship was driven ashore at Spurn Point, Yorkshire. She was on a voyage from London to Hull, Yorkshire.
Beaufoy	United Kingdom	The victualling hoy sank at Dover, Kent.
Betsey	United Kingdom	The barque was driven ashore near Margate, Kent. Her crew were rescued. She was on a voyage from Newfoundland, British North America to London.
Betsey	United Kingdom	The ship foundered in The Downs with the loss of three of her crew. She was on a voyage from London to Portsmouth, Hampshire.
Blanchland	United Kingdom	The brig was driven ashore and wrecked on the Norfolk coast between Wells-next-the-Sea and Cromer with the loss of nine of her ten crew.
Calliope	United Kingdom	The West Indiaman was driven ashore at Winterton-on-Sea, Norfolk. She later refloated but was driven ashore and wrecked at Caister-on-Sea, Norfolk. She was on a voyage from Leith, Lothian to Jamaica.
Flora, and Lovell	United Kingdom	Flora was in collision with Lovell in The Downs and sank. Lovell was abandoned by her crew; she also sank.
Flora	United Kingdom	The ship was driven ashore near Hornsea, Yorkshire.
Flora	Denmark	The sloop, a prize, was abandoned in the English Channel. She was on a voyage from Dover to London. She came ashore on the French coast.
Fountain	United Kingdom	The brigantine sank at Wisbech, Cambridgeshire, with the loss of a crew member.
Frederick	United Kingdom	The ship was driven ashore at Margate.
Hope	United Kingdom	The ketch was driven ashore at Kingsdown, Kent.
Hope	United Kingdom	The ketch was driven ashore at Walmer, Kent.
Industry	United Kingdom	The ship was driven ashore at Cowes.
Jenny	United Kingdom	The ship was driven ashore at Margate.
John	United Kingdom	The ship was lost in Sheephaven Bay. She was on a voyage from Liverpool to Galway.
Levant	United Kingdom	The ship was run into by a collier. She then collided with three other vessels and was abandoned by her crew. She consequently foundered in the English Channel off the east Kent coast. Levant was on a voyage from London to São Miguel Island, Azores.
Maida	United Kingdom	The ship was driven ashore at Westgate-on-Sea, Kent. She was on a voyage from Cork to London.
Mary and Ann	United Kingdom	The ship foundered in the English Channel off Margate. She was on a voyage from Surinam to London.
Nordstern	Bremen	The ship was wrecked on Heligoland.
Northumberland Packet	United Kingdom	The ship was driven ashore near Scarborough, Yorkshire. Her crew were rescued by the Scarborough Lifeboat. She was on a voyage from Hull, Yorkshire to Newcastle-upon-Tyne, Northumberland.
Nottingham	United Kingdom	The ship ran aground on the Goodwin Sands, Kent, and was abandoned by her crew. She was refloated but consequently foundered. Nottingham was on a voyage from Deptford, Kent, to Portsmouth.
Phoebe	United Kingdom	The ship was driven ashore at Margate.
Sally	United Kingdom	The ship was driven out of Bridlington, Yorkshire. She came ashore at Hornsea.
Susannah	United Kingdom	The sloop ran aground off Whitby. She was on a voyage from Bridlington to Whitby. She was refloated but was driven ashore and wrecked. Three would-be rescuers were drowned when their coble capsized.
Thomas and Mary	United Kingdom	The sloop was driven ashore at Portland, Dorset. She was on a voyage from Poole, Dorset, to Exeter, Devon.
Union	United States	The ship was driven ashore at Margate. She was later refloated and taken in to Ramsgate.
Venus	United Kingdom	The collier was driven ashore at Deal, Kent. She was on a voyage from South Shields, County Durham, to Gibraltar.
Vervandering	Bremen	The ship was driven ashore and wrecked on Heligoland.
William and Henry	United Kingdom	The ship was driven ashore at Ramsgate, Kent. She was on a voyage from London to the Cape of Good Hope. William and Henry was later refloated and taken in to Ramsgate.
William and James	United Kingdom	The ship was driven ashore at Great Yarmouth, Norfolk.
Two unnamed vessels	United Kingdom	Two boats capsized at Blyth, Northumberland with the loss of all nine people on board.
Three unnamed vessels	United Kingdom	The fishing boats were lost at Newbiggin, Northumberland with the loss of ten lives.
Unnamed	(Netherlands) Kingdom of Holland	The hoy was driven ashore at Margater.

=== 15 January ===
List of shipwrecks: 15 January 1808
Ship	State	Description
Lord Keith	Royal Navy	The same storm that wrecked HMS Sparkler (Royal Navy) drove His Majesty's hired armed cutter Lord Keith into Cuxhaven where the French captured her entire crew.
Ohio	United States	The ship was wrecked at Cape Florida, East Florida. She was on a voyage from Jamaica to New York.
HMS Sparkler	Royal Navy	The gun-brig was wrecked on Terschelling, Friesland, Kingdom of Holland with the loss of 17 of her 53 crew.

=== 16 January ===
List of shipwrecks: 16 January 1808
Ship	State	Description
Levant	United Kingdom	The brig was driven ashore on the French coast. She was refloated on 26 January and taken in to Saint-Valery-sur-Somme, Somme.
Orpheus	Sweden	The brig was abandoned in the North Sea 20 nautical miles (37 km) east south east of Coquet Island, Northumberland, United Kingdom, with the loss of seven of her twelve crew. Survivors were rescued by Eliza (United Kingdom). Orpheus was on a voyage from Dram, Norway, to Leith, Lothian, United Kingdom.

=== 17 January ===
List of shipwrecks: 17 January 1808
Ship	State	Description
Jane	United Kingdom	Napoleonic Wars: The ship was captured and burnt by Hermione and Hortense (both French Navy). Jane was on a voyage from Newfoundland, British North America to Grenada.
Two unnamed vessels	United Kingdom	A brig and a schooner were driven ashore at Spurn Point, Yorkshire.

=== 20 January ===
List of shipwrecks: 20 January 1808
Ship	State	Description
Mary Anne	United Kingdom	The ship was wrecked near Wexford. Her crew were rescued. She was on a voyage from Kinsale, County Cork, to Dublin.
Catherine Green	United Kingdom	The ship was wrecked near Wexford. Her crew were rescued. She was on a voyage from Kinsale to Dublin.

=== 23 January ===
List of shipwrecks: 23 January 1808
Ship	State	Description
Hope	(United Kingdom of Great Britain and Ireland) Dominica	The brig ran aground at Caernarfon. Her crew were rescued. She was destroyed in a storm on 28 January. Hope was on a voyage from Dominica to Liverpool, Lancashire.

=== 24 January ===
List of shipwrecks: 24 January 1808
Ship	State	Description
HMS Carrier	Royal Navy	The cutter ran aground off Étaples, Pas-de-Calais, France. She was abandoned by her crew, who tried to set her afire without success. They were rescued and became prisoners of the French. HMS Carrier was subsequently taken into French service as the privateer Anacreon.

=== 28 January ===
List of shipwrecks: 28 January 1808
Ship	State	Description
John	United Kingdom	The brig was wrecked near Bideford, Devon. She was on a voyage from Newfoundland, British North America to Waterford.
Othello	United States	The ship was wrecked near Bideford. Her crew were rescued. She was on a voyage from Charleston, South Carolina, to Liverpool, Lancashire, United Kingdom.
Summer	United Kingdom	The ship was wrecked near Gothenburg, Sweden, with the loss of all but three of her crew. She was on a voyage from London to a Baltic port.

=== 29 January ===
List of shipwrecks: 29 January 1808
Ship	State	Description
Little George	United Kingdom	The ship was wrecked on Long Island, New York, United States.

=== 30 January ===
List of shipwrecks: 30 January 1808
Ship	State	Description
Canopus	Bremen	The ship was driven ashore and wrecked at Plymouth, Devon, United Kingdom with the loss of a crew member. She was on a voyage from Saint Thomas, Virgin Islands to Gothenburg, Sweden. Canopus was refloated on 1 February.
Grace	United Kingdom	The ship was wrecked on a reef north east of Nevis. She was on a voyage from London to Nevis.
Mary and Sally	United States	The ship was wrecked at Westport, County Mayo, United Kingdom. She was on a voyage from Charleston, South Carolina, to Liverpool, Lancashire, United Kingdom.

=== 31 January ===
List of shipwrecks: 31 January 1808
Ship	State	Description
Abby & Sally	United States	The ship was driven ashore and damaged at the Cape of Good Hope. She was refloated on 2 February.
HMS Leda	Royal Navy	The Leda-class frigate ran aground and was wrecked at Milford Haven, Pembrokeshire. Her crew were rescued.

=== Unknown date ===
List of shipwrecks: Unknown date in January 1808
Ship	State	Description
HMS Ariel	Royal Navy	The sloop-of-war ran aground on the Gunfleet Sand, in the North Sea off the coast of Essex and was severely damaged. She was refloated and put into Harwich, Essex, on 30 January.
Belfast	United Kingdom	The ship was lost near Sligo. She was on a voyage from Sligo to Dublin.
Betsey	United States	The brig was driven ashore and wrecked at North Meols, Lancashire, United Kingdom. Her 24 crew were rescued. She was on a voyage from Philadelphia, Pennsylvania, to Liverpool, Lancashire.
Brothers	United Kingdom	The ship was wrecked in The Wash off Boston, Lincolnshire. Her crew were rescued.
Carl	Sweden	The ship was driven ashore and wrecked near Gothenburg. She was on a voyage from Gothenburg to a Baltic port.
Courier	United Kingdom	The ship foundered in the Atlantic Ocean off the Isles of Scilly with the loss of all hands. She was on a voyage from Newfoundland to Dartmouth, Devon.
HMS Delight	Royal Navy	War of the Fourth Coalition: The Seagull-class brig-sloop ran aground off Reggio Calabria, Kingdom of Sicily, where she came under fire from French shore-based artillery. She was burnt to prevent her capture.
Divina Providentia	Portugal	The ship was driven ashore near Plymouth, Devon, United Kingdom. She was on a voyage from Plymouth to London.
Edwin	United Kingdom	The ship foundered in the Baltic Sea. Her crew were rescued. She was on a voyage from Saint Petersburg, Russia, to Boston, Lincolnshire.
Elizabeth	United Kingdom	The ship was wrecked on the Irish coast.
Endeavour	United Kingdom	The transport ship was driven ashore and wrecked on Heligoland.
Excell	United Kingdom	The ship foundered in The Downs. Her crew were rescued.
Endeavour	United Kingdom	The ship was driven ashore in the Highlands. She was on a voyage from Messina, Kingdom of Sicily, to Liverpool.
Fanny	United Kingdom	The ship was driven ashore in Carmarthen Bay. She was on a voyage from Baltimore, Maryland, United States, to Bristol, Gloucestershire.
Flora	United Kingdom	The ship, as cartel, was lost in Carmarthen Bay.
Flora	United Kingdom	The ship was driven ashore at Cromer, Norfolk. She was on a voyage from Hull, Yorkshire, to Leith, Lothian.
HMS Flora	United Kingdom	The fifth-rate was wrecked on the Dutch coast. All on board were rescued.
Friends Delight	United Kingdom	The ship sank at Pill, Gloucestershire. She was on a voyage from London to Bristol.
Gabriel	United Kingdom	The ship was sunk in the North Sea off Coquet Island, Northumberland, by the privateer Eglé (France).
George	United Kingdom	A boat from the ship was discovered off the Isles of Scilly by HMS Plover (Royal Navy).
Globe	United Kingdom	The brig was driven ashore and wrecked on Islay. Her crew were rescued. She was on a voyage from Liverpool, Lancashire, to Galway.
Good Intent	United Kingdom	The ship foundered in a gale.
Goodrich	United Kingdom	The ship was wrecked on the Irish coast. She was on a voyage from Newfoundland to Poole, Dorset.
Grove Hill	United Kingdom	The ship was driven ashore near Copenhagen, Denmark. She was on a voyage from Riga, Russia, to Hull.
Haabet	Flag unknown	The ship foundered in the Atlantic Ocean whilst on a voyage from Plymouth to Charleston, South Carolina, United States. Her crew were rescued by the privateer Crescent (United Kingdom).
Harmony	United Kingdom	The ship foundered in the Bristol Channel off Barry Island, Glamorgan. She was on a voyage from Bristol to Milford, Pembrokeshire.
Hope	United Kingdom	The ship was driven ashore at Deal, Kent. She was later refloated and taken in to Ramsgate, Kent.
Hope	United Kingdom	The ship foundered with the loss of two of her crew. She was on a voyage from Figueira da Foz, Portugal, to Guernsey, Channel Islands.
Johannes	Sweden	The ship was driven ashore and wrecked near Gothenburg. She was on a voyage from Gothenburg to a Baltic port.
John and Joseph	United States	The ship was wrecked off Middelburg, Zeeland, Kingdom of Holland. She was on a voyage from Baltimore, Maryland, to Amsterdam, North Holland, Kingdom of Holland.
Joseph	United Kingdom	The ship foundered in Aberdaron Bay. Her crew were rescued. She was on a voyage from Milford to Liverpool.
Knud	Flag unknown	The ship was lost at Cape La Hague, Manche, France. She was on a voyage from Lisbon, Portugal, to London.
Maria	Danzig	The ship was wrecked at Varberg, Sweden. She was on a voyage from Danzig to Belfast, County Antrim.
Mercurius	Sweden	The ship was driven ashore and wrecked near Gothenburg. She was on a voyage from Hull to Gothenburg.
Neutrality	Denmark	The ship was detained by Caledonia (United Kingdom). She subsequently foundered in the Atlantic Ocean.
Nottingham	United Kingdom	The ship foundered in the English Channel off Deal. She was on a voyage from Deptford, Kent, to Portsmouth, Hampshire.
Novo Conto	Sweden	The ship was driven ashore and wrecked near Gothenburg. She was on a voyage from London to Gothenburg.
Peggy	United Kingdom	The ship was wrecked on the Isle of Man with the loss of all on board. She was on a voyage from Sligo to Liverpool.
Pope	United Kingdom	The ship was driven ashore and wrecked at Caernarfon. She was on a voyage from Dominica to Liverpool.
Prosperity	United Kingdom	The ship foundered whilst on a voyage from Ireland to New York. All on board were rescued by Patriote (French Navy).
Renown	United Kingdom	The ship was driven ashore at Tenby, Pembrokeshire. She was on a voyage from Cork to Swansea, Glamorgan. She was later refloated and taken in to Tenby for repairs.
Rising Star	United Kingdom	The ship was driven ashore and wrecked at Aldeburgh, Suffolk, with the loss of all but two of her crew. She was on a voyage from Cley-next-the-Sea, Norfolk, to London.
Roxburgh Packet	United Kingdom	The ship was driven ashore at Blakeney, Norfolk. She was on a voyage from Leith to London.
Sally	United Kingdom	The ship sank off Bridlington, Yorkshire.
Sandwich	United Kingdom	The ship foundered in a gale.
Speculation	Sweden	The ship was driven ashore and wrecked near Gothenburg. She was on a voyage from Lancaster, Lancashire, to Gothenburg.
Sugnal	United Kingdom	The ship was driven ashore on the Isle of Mull. She was on a voyage from Liverpool to Limerick.
Sultana	United States	The ship foundered in the North Sea off Hellevoetsluis, Zeeland, Kingdom of Holland.
Ulysses	United Kingdom	The ship was lost at Newport, County Mayo. Her crew were rescued. She was on a voyage from Wiscasset, Maine, United States, to Liverpool.
Venus	United Kingdom	The ship was driven ashore at Deal. She was on a voyage from South Shields, County Durham, to Gibraltar.
Vine	United Kingdom	The ship ran aground on the Gunfleet Sand, in the North Sea off the coast of Essex. she was on a voyage from Newcastle upon Tyne to London.
Vine	United Kingdom	The ship was wrecked at Gothenburg. She was on a voyage from Liverpool to a Baltic port.
William Murdoch	United States	The ship was lost near the Virginia Capes in late January. She was on a voyage from Rotterdam, South Holland, Kingdom of Holland, to Georgetown.
Zalema	United States	The ship was lost near New Romney, Kent. She was on a voyage from Philadelphia, Pennsylvania, to Rotterdam.
Unnamed	Portugal	The ship was lost off Skagen, Denmark. She was on a voyage from Saint Petersburg, Russia to Lisbon.

== February ==
=== 5 February ===
List of shipwrecks: 5 February 1808
Ship	State	Description
Catharine	United Kingdom	The ship foundered in the North Sea off Redcar, Yorkshire. Her crew were rescued.
Dispatch	United Kingdom	The ship foundered in the North Sea. Her crew were rescued. She was on a voyage from Berwick-upon-Tweed, Northumberland to Newcastle-upon-Tyne.

=== 6 February ===
List of shipwrecks: 6 February 1808
Ship	State	Description
Comerciante	Spain	The ship was driven ashore and wrecked near Gibraltar.
Euphrates	United Kingdom	The ship was driven ashore and wrecked at Algeciras, Spain. She was on a voyage from British Honduras to an Irish port.
Mary	United States	The ship was driven ashore and wrecked near Gibraltar.
Minerva	United Kingdom	The ship was driven ashore and wrecked near Gibraltar. She was on a voyage from Barcelona, Spain, to Gibraltar.

=== 8 February ===
List of shipwrecks: 8 February 1808
Ship	State	Description
Peggy	United Kingdom	The ship departed from Gravesend, Kent, for Cork. No further trace, presumed foundered with the loss of all hands.

=== 9 February ===
List of shipwrecks: 9 February 1808
Ship	State	Description
Joseph and John	United Kingdom	The ship struck rocks in the North Sea off Berwick-upon-Tweed, Northumberland and sank. Her crew were rescued. She was on a voyage from Hull, Yorkshire to Grangemouth, Stirlingshire.
Matilda	United Kingdom	Napoleonic Wars: The ship was captured by a French privateer whilst on a voyage from Halifax, British North America, to Saint Domingue. She was set afire and sunk.

=== 10 February ===
List of shipwrecks: 10 February 1808
Ship	State	Description
Dove	United Kingdom	The ship was driven ashore at Dublin. Her crew were rescued.
Havant	United Kingdom	The ship struck the pier and sank at Ramsgate, Kent. she was on a voyage from Great Yarmouth, Norfolk, to Portsmouth, Hampshire.
Mayflower	United Kingdom	The ship was driven ashore at Dublin. Her crew were rescued. She was on a voyage from Clonakilty, County Cork, to Dublin.
Robert Bollon	United States	The ship foundered in the Atlantic Ocean (27°10′N 37°00′W. Her crew survived. She was on a voyage from Liverpool to Savannah, Georgia.
Washington	United Kingdom	The ship was wrecked at Cape Wrath, Sutherland, with the loss of all but three of her crew. She was on a voyage from Lisbon, Portugal, to Liverpool, Lancashire.

=== 11 February ===
List of shipwrecks: 11 February 1808
Ship	State	Description
Harriet	United Kingdom	The ship was wrecked on the West Hoyle Bank, in Liverpool Bay with the loss of 25 of the 32 people on board. She was on a voyage from Liverpool, Lancashire, to Berbice.
Sygnet	French Navy	The 20-gun corvette was driven ashore and wrecked at Cherbourg, Manche.
Seine	French Navy	The 20-gun corvette was driven ashore and wrecked at Cherbourg.
Unnamed	United Kingdom	The pilot boat was lost at Drogheda, County Louth with the loss of two of her crew.
Eight unnamed vessels	United Kingdom	The fishing boats were lost off Skerries, County Dublin with the loss of all hands.
Two unnamed vessels	United States	The ships were driven ashore in Dublin Bay.
Eight unnamed vessels	United Kingdom	The coasters were driven ashore in Dublin Bay.

=== 12 February ===
List of shipwrecks: 12 February 1808
Ship	State	Description
Amity	United Kingdom	The brig was driven ashore at Harwich, Essex. She was on a voyage from Hull, Yorkshire, to London. Amity was later refloated and brought into that port.
Amphitrite	United Kingdom	The ship was driven ashore at Ryde, Isle of Wight. She was later refloated.
Benjamin	United Kingdom	The ship was driven ashore and wrecked at Gore-end Bay, Margate, Kent, with the loss of all hands. She was on a voyage from Waterford to London.
Brothers	United Kingdom	The schooner was driven ashore and wrecked at Dover, Kent.
Buxar	United Kingdom	The ship was driven ashore between Corton, Suffolk and Gunton, Norfolk. She was on a voyage from Sunderland, County Durham, to London. Her crew were rescued.
Charleston	United Kingdom	The ship sank at Scarborough, Yorkshire. She was on a voyage from Newcastle-upon-Tyne, Northumberland to London.
Clyde	United Kingdom	The brig was driven ashore and wrecked at Gore-end Bay with the loss of four of the nine people on board. She was on a voyage from Halifax, Nova Scotia, British North America, to London.
Countess of Elgin	United Kingdom	The cutter was driven ashore in Margate Bay.
Crompton	United Kingdom	The ship was driven ashore between Corton and Gunton. Her crew were rescued.
Diana	United States	The ship was driven ashore at Dublin, United Kingdom. She was on a voyage from New York to Dublin.
Douro	United Kingdom	The ship was driven ashore between Corton and Gunton. She was on a voyage from Hull to Surinam. Her crew were rescued.
Eliza	United Kingdom	The ship ran aground on the Hoyle Bank, in Liverpool Bay. She was on a voyage from Liverpool, Lancashire, to Savannah, Georgia, United States. Eliza was refloated the next day and taken in to Liverpool.
Elizabeth	United Kingdom	Captain Jeffries' ship was driven ashore between Corton and Gunton. Her crew were rescued.
Elizabeth	United Kingdom	Captain Prowton's ship was driven ashore and wrecked at Great Yarmouth. Her crew were rescued by Manby mortar.
Elizabeth	Denmark	The ship, a prize, was driven ashore at Queenborough, Kent.
Governor	United Kingdom	The hoy was driven ashore and wrecked at Margate.
Griffin	United Kingdom	The ship was driven ashore between Corton and Gunton. She was on a voyage from Ipswich, Suffolk, to King's Lynn, Norfolk. Her crew were rescued.
Harmony	United Kingdom	The brig was driven ashore at Harwich. She was on a voyage from Hull to London.
Heroine	United Kingdom	The ship was lost whilst on a voyage from Greenock, Renfrewshire, to Limerick.
Huntress	United Kingdom	The ship was driven ashore in the River Mersey at Liverpool. She was on a voyage from Virginia, United States, to Liverpool. Huntress was later refloated.
Jane	United Kingdom	The ship was driven ashore at Dún Laoghaire, County Dublin.
Jenny	United Kingdom	The ship was driven ashore between Corton and Gunton. She was on a voyage from London to Newcastle-upon-Tyne. Her crew were rescued.
John and Margaret	United Kingdom	The ship was driven ashore near Wells-next-the-Sea, Norfolk. She was on a voyage from Berwick upon Tweed to London.
Leith	United Kingdom	The brig was driven ashore at Harwich. She was on a voyage from Newcastle-upon-Tyne to London.
Little Jane	United Kingdom	The ship was driven ashore at Ryde. She was on a voyage from London to the Cape of Good Hope. She was later refloated.
Lord Keith	United Kingdom	The cutter was driven ashore at Margate.
Lucy and Alida	United Kingdom	The schooner was driven ashore in Marsh Bay, Isle of Thanet. Her crew were rescued. She was on a voyage from Africa to London. Lucy and Alida was refloated on 13 March and taken in to Margate.
Malcolm	United Kingdom	The ship was driven ashore at Ryde.
HMS Mariner	Royal Navy	The brig was driven ashore in Margate Bay.
Martha	United Kingdom	The ship was driven ashore at Great Yarmouth.
Mary	United States	The ship was driven ashore at Ryde.
Marys	United Kingdom	The ship was driven ashore at Great Yarmouth.
Mayflower	United Kingdom	The ship was driven ashore and wrecked on Heligoland. Her crew were rescued.
Mercator	United States	The ship was driven ashore near Dún Laoghaire.
Neptune	United Kingdom	The ship was driven ashore at Kingsgate, Kent. She caught fire the next day and was destroyed. Neptune was on a voyage from Chatham, Kent, to Chepstow, Monmouthshire.
Neptune	United Kingdom	The ship was driven ashore at Portland, Dorset, whilst on a voyage from Arundel, Sussex, to Bridport, Dorset. She was later refloated.
Norfolk	United Kingdom	The brig was driven ashore at Harwich. She was on a voyage from Newcastle-upon-Tyne to London.
Olympus	United Kingdom	The ship was driven ashore and wrecked at Dún Laoghaire. She was on a voyage from Cork to Dublin.
Perseverance	United Kingdom	The ship was driven ashore at Gore-end Bay. She was on a voyage from Cork to London. She was refloated on 3 March and taken in to the River Thames.
Providence	United Kingdom	The ship foundered in the North Sea with the loss of all hands. She was on a voyage from London to Madeira, Portugal.
Quebec	United Kingdom	The brig was driven ashore at Orfordness, Suffolk, and was abandoned by her crew. She subsequently refloated and drifted out to sea.
Racehorse	United Kingdom	The ship sprang a leak and foundered in the English Channel. Her crew were rescued. She was on a voyage from King's Lynn to Liverpool.
Ravensworth	United Kingdom	The ship foundered in the North Sea off Harwich with the loss of six of her nine crew. She was on a voyage from Sunderland, County Durham, to London. Her crew were rescued.
Rochdale	United Kingdom	The ship was driven ashore between Corton and Gunton. She was on a voyage from Hull to London.
Snake	United Kingdom	The ship was driven ashore at Margate. She was on a voyage from Poole, Dorset, to London.
St. Michael	United Kingdom	The ship was driven ashore at Dún Laorghaire.
Swift	United Kingdom	The ship was driven ashore at Great Yarmouth with the loss of a crew member. She was on a voyage from London to Montrose, Forfarshire.
Telemachus	United Kingdom	The sloop ran aground on the Knock John Sandbank, at the mouth of the River Thames and was wrecked with the loss of two of her three crew.
Thomas and Judith	United Kingdom	The ship was driven ashore and wrecked at Gore-end Bay, with the loss of all hands, four or five lives. She was on a voyage from Portsmouth, Hampshire, to London.
Union	United Kingdom	The ship was driven ashore between Corton and Gunton. Her crew were rescued.
Union	United Kingdom	The ship was driven ashore at Dublin. She was on a voyage from Whitehaven, Cumberland, to Dublin.
Unity	United Kingdom	The ship was driven ashore at Portland. She was on a voyage from Southampton, Hampshire, to Penryn, Cornwall. Unity was later refloated.
Three unnamed vessels	United Kingdom	Two full-rigged ships and a brig were driven ashore in Stokes Bay .
Unnamed	United Kingdom	The lugger foundered on the Motherbank.
Two unnamed vessels	United Kingdom	The brigs were driven ashore at Harwich.

=== 13 February ===
List of shipwrecks: 13 February 1808
Ship	State	Description
Elizabeth	United Kingdom	The ship was driven ashore and wrecked at Great Yarmouth, Norfolk. Her crew were rescued. She was on a voyage from Plymouth, Devon, to Boston, Lincolnshire.
Lord Melville	United Kingdom	The ship was driven ashore at Great Yarmouth.
Robin Redbreast	United Kingdom	The ship was driven ashore at Great Yarmouth.

=== 14 February ===
List of shipwrecks: 14 February 1808
Ship	State	Description
Mary	United Kingdom	The ship foundered in The Downs. She was on a voyage from Sunderland, County Durham, to Weymouth, Dorset.

=== 15 February ===
List of shipwrecks: 15 February 1808
Ship	State	Description
Ohio	United States	The ship was wrecked on Martyr's Reef, off the Bahamas. Her crew were rescued. She was on a voyage from Jamaica to New York.
HMS Raposa	Royal Navy	The corvette ran aground 50 nautical miles (93 km) off Cartagena, Viceroyalty of New Granada. She was set afire and scuttled by her 55 crew, who were rescued by the Spanish and taken prisoner.

=== 16 February ===
List of shipwrecks: 16 February 1808
Ship	State	Description
Ida	United States	The brig was driven ashore at Cape May, New Jersey. She was on a voyage from Lisbon, Portugal, to Philadelphia, Pennsylvania.
Nelson	United Kingdom	The brig was driven ashore at Bideford, Devon. She was on a voyage from St. Ives, Cornwall, to Newport, Monmouthshire.
Thetis	United Kingdom	The ship was driven ashore at Cape May.

=== 20 February ===
List of shipwrecks: 20 February 1808
Ship	State	Description
Rhine	United Kingdom	The ship was driven ashore on Heligoland.

=== 23 February ===
List of shipwrecks: 23 February 1808
Ship	State	Description
HMS Hirondelle	United Kingdom	The brig ran aground off Cape Bon and capsized, becoming a wreck, and waves swamped one of her boats as it tried to reach shore. Four members of Hirondelle′s crew survived.

=== 24 February ===
List of shipwrecks: 24 February 1808
Ship	State	Description
Chalmers	United Kingdom	Atlantic slave trade: The ship was wrecked on the Spanish Main. She was on a voyage from Africa to the West Indies. The slaves were rescued by the Spanish.

=== 25 February ===
List of shipwrecks: 25 February 1808
Ship	State	Description
Two unnamed vessels	United Kingdom	The colliers ran aground off Lowestoft, Suffolk. One was refloated and beached. The other was refloated the next day and taken in to Great Yarmouth, Norfolk.

=== 26 February ===
List of shipwrecks: 26 February 1808
Ship	State	Description
Boreas	United Kingdom	The ship was driven ashore and wrecked at Pakefield, Suffolk.
Nancy	United Kingdom	The ship was wrecked on the Goodwin Sands, Kent. Her crew were rescued.

=== 28 February ===
List of shipwrecks: 28 February 1808
Ship	State	Description
Lars Johan	Sweden	The ship was driven ashore near Campbeltown, Wigtownshire, United Kingdom. She was on a voyage from Helsingfors to Liverpool, Lancashire, United Kingdom.

=== 29 February ===
List of shipwrecks: 29 February 1808
Ship	State	Description
Jupiter	United Kingdom	The ship was captured and destroyed off Madeira by Pénélope and Thémis (both French Navy). She was on a voyage from London to Barbados.
London	United Kingdom	The ship was captured and destroyed off Madeira by Pénélope and Thémis (both French Navy). She was on a voyage from London to Barbados.
Magdalen	United Kingdom	Napoleonic Wars: The ship was captured and destroyed off Madeira by Pénélope and Thémis (both French Navy). She was on a voyage from Falmouth, Cornwall, to Barbados.
Richmond	United Kingdom	The ship was captured and destroyed off Madeira by Pénélope and Thémis (both French Navy). She was on a voyage from London to Barbados.
Trafalgar	United Kingdom	The ship was captured and destroyed off Madeira by Pénélope and Thémis (both French Navy). She was on a voyage from London to Surinam.

=== Unknown date ===
List of shipwrecks: Unknown date in February 1808
Ship	State	Description
Active	United Kingdom	The ship was wrecked on Guernsey, Channel Islands.
Albion	United Kingdom	The ship was abandoned in the North Sea off the mouth of the Humber.
Anna Maria	(Denmark) Norway	The ship departed from Arundahl for London, United Kingdom. No further trace, presumed foundered in the North Sea with the loss of all hands.
Bristol Packet	United Kingdom	The full-rigged ship foundered in the Bristol Channel off Minehead, Somerset. She was on a voyage from Teignmouth, Devon, to Bristol, Gloucestershire.
Brutus	United States	Napoleonic Wars: The ship was captured and burnt by Hermione and Hortense (both French Navy). Brutus was on a voyage from Liverpool, Lancashire, United Kingdom, to New York.
Cecilia	United Kingdom	The ship was driven ashore near Margate, Kent. She was on a voyage from São Miguel Island, Azores to London. Cecilia was refloated on 12 February and put into Margate.
Commerce	United Kingdom	The ship was driven ashore. She was on a voyage from Demerara to Cardiff, Glamorgan and London. She was later refloated and taken in to Swansea, Glamorgan.
Delight	United States	The ship was abandoned in the North Sea. She subsequently came ashore on the coast of Essex. Delight was refloated and taken in to Sheerness, Kent on 13 February.
Dutchman	United Kingdom	The ship sank at Whitby after 24 February. She was on a voyage from London to Newcastle upon Tyne.
Eliza	United States	Napoleonic Wars: The ship was captured and burnt by French frigate Hermione (1804) and Hortense (both French Navy). Eliza was on a voyage from Liverpool to New York.
Europe	United Kingdom	The ship was driven ashore on South Uist, Outer Hebrides. She was on a voyage from Pictou, Nova Scotia, British North America, to Ayr
Fortitude	United Kingdom	The ship was wrecked at Alnwick, Northumberland, with the loss of all hands. She was on a voyage from Gibraltar to Liverpool.
Friend	United Kingdom	The ship was driven ashore at Lymington, Hampshire. She was on a voyage from London to Falmouth, Cornwall. Friend was refloated on 1 March.
Industry	United Kingdom	The ship departed Berwick-upon-Tweed, Northumberland, for London. No further trace, presumed foundered with the loss of all hands.
Lochnell Packet	United Kingdom	The ship was driven ashore at "Red Noses". All on board were rescued. She was on a voyage from Liverpool to Dublin.
Margaretta Barbara	Sweden	The ship was wrecked whilst on a voyage from Varberg to London.
Mars	United States	The brig was detained by Redbridge (French Navy) but was subsequently lost off Nassau, Bahamas.
Matilda	United Kingdom	The ship was driven ashore at Plymouth, Devon. She was on a voyage from Montevideo to London.
Mentor	United Kingdom	The ship struck an anchor and sank at the mouth of the River Avon. She was on a voyage from Porto to Bristol.
Neptune	United Kingdom	The ship was driven ashore and wrecked at Scarborough, Yorkshire.
Pomona	United Kingdom	The ship was driven ashore at "Red Noses" She was on a voyage from Whitehaven, Cumberland, to Liverpool.
Sally	United Kingdom	The ship ran aground at Fishguard, Pembrokeshire. She was on a voyage from Cork to Liverpool, Lancashire.
Spraycombe	United Kingdom	The ship was wrecked in the Scilly Islands.
Star	United Kingdom	The ship foundered in the North Sea. Her crew were rescued. She was on a voyage from Great Yarmouth, Norfolk, to Bridlington, Yorkshire.
HMS Tang	Royal Navy	The Ballahoo-class schooner foundered in the Atlantic Ocean with the loss of all 25 people on board.
True Briton	United Kingdom	The ship was wrecked on the Shipwash Sand, in the North Sea off the coast of Essex. Her crew were rescued. She was on a voyage from South Shields, County Durham, to London.
'Unnamed	(United Kingdom of Great Britain and Ireland) Malta	The brig was driven ashore at Gibraltar between 7 and 10 February.

== March ==
=== 2 March ===
List of shipwrecks: 2 March 1808
Ship	State	Description
Mentor	United Kingdom	The ship was run down and sunk in the North Sea by Berwick Merchant (United Kingdom).

=== 7 March ===
List of shipwrecks: 7 March 1808
Ship	State	Description
General Moore	United Kingdom	The ship was driven ashore at Wexford.

=== 8 March ===
List of shipwrecks: 8 March 1808
Ship	State	Description
Dunkerquoise	France	Napoleonic Wars: The privateer was driven ashore at Katwijk, South Holland, Kingdom of Holland and was then destroyed by Princess Augusta (United Kingdom).

=== 9 March ===
List of shipwrecks: 9 March 1808
Ship	State	Description
St. Michael	United Kingdom	The ship foundered off the Blasket Islands, County Kerry. Her crew were rescued. She was reported to have been on a voyage from Kinsale, County Cork, to Cork.

=== 12 March ===
List of shipwrecks: 12 March 1808
Ship	State	Description
Hope	United Kingdom	The brig was wrecked at Mevagissey, Cornwall. Her crew were rescued.

=== 14 March ===
List of shipwrecks: 14 March 1808
Ship	State	Description
Fanny	United Kingdom	The ship departed from Southampton, Hampshire, for the Bristol Channel. No further trace, presumed foundered with the loss of all hands.

=== 15 March ===
List of shipwrecks: 15 March 1808
Ship	State	Description
Harry	United Kingdom	The ship departed from Liverpool, Lancashire, for Saint John, New Brunswick, British North America. No further trace, presumed foundered with the loss of all hands.

=== 19 March ===
List of shipwrecks: 19 March 1808
Ship	State	Description
Elizabeth	United Kingdom	Napoleonic Wars: The ship was captured by two French Navy frigates whilst on a voyage from Malta to London. She was set afire and sunk.

=== 20 March ===
List of shipwrecks: 20 March 1808
Ship	State	Description
Diana	United Kingdom	The ship was wrecked at Teignmouth, Devon.

=== 21 March ===
List of shipwrecks: 21 March 1808
Ship	State	Description
Diamond Packet	United Kingdom	The smack was wrecked on the Tyningham Sands, in the North Sea off the Lothian coast, with the loss of five lives. She was on a voyage from London to Leith, Lothian

=== 22 March ===
List of shipwrecks: 22 March 1808
Ship	State	Description
Bremen Packet	United Kingdom	The ship foundered at the mouth of the Humber. Her crew were rescued.
HDMS Prins Christian Frederick	(Denmark) Dano-Norwegian Navy	Battle of Zealand Point: The 74-gun ship of the line ran aground whilst engaged in a battle with HMS Nassau and HMS Stately (both Royal Navy). She was captured by the British and was subsequently set afire and destroyed on 23 March.
Prosperity	United Kingdom	The ship foundered at the mouth of the Humber.
Syren	French Navy	War of the Fourth Coalition: The frigate was driven ashore at L'Orient, Morbihan in an action with a Royal Navy frigate. She was later refloated and taken in to L'Orient, but was consequently condemned.

=== 23 March ===
List of shipwrecks: 23 March 1808
Ship	State	Description
HMS Astraea	Royal Navy	The Active-class frigate was wrecked on the Horseshoe Reef, off Anegada, Virgin Islands with the loss of four of her crew. Survivors were rescued by HMS St. Christopher (Royal Navy)
HDMS Prinds Christian Frederick	Royal Danish Navy	Gunboat War, Battle of Zealand Point: The Prindcesse Caroline-class ship of the line was driven ashore on the coast of Zealand by HMS Nassau and HMS Stately (both Royal Navy). She was burnt by the British.

=== 24 March ===
List of shipwrecks: 24 March 1808
Ship	State	Description
HMS Milbrook	Royal Navy	A squall drive the ship onto a reef off Berlenga Grande Island in the Berlengas in the Atlantic Ocean off Portugal. Her crew refloated her and anchored her in clear water for the night.
Resolution	(United Kingdom of Great Britain and Ireland) Guernsey	Napoleonic Wars: The privateer was captured and burnt by Hermione and Hortense (both French Navy).

=== 25 March ===
List of shipwrecks: 25 March 1808
Ship	State	Description
HMS Electra	Royal Navy	The Seagull-class brig-sloop ran aground off Augusta, Sicily. Although salvaged, she was declared a total loss and was dismantled.
HMS Milbrook	Royal Navy	For the second day in a row, the ship was driven onto rocks off Berlenga Grande Island in the Berlengas in the Atlantic Ocean off Portugal. She bilged, fell over onto her side, and was lost. Her crew survived.

=== 26 March ===
List of shipwrecks: 26 March 1808
Ship	State	Description
Caledonia	United Kingdom	The ship was driven ashore and wrecked at Redcar, Yorkshire, with the loss of seventeen or nineteen lives.

=== 30 March ===
List of shipwrecks: 30 March 1808
Ship	State	Description
North Star	United Kingdom	The whaler was destroyed by fire.
Providence	United Kingdom	The ship was sunk at Great Yarmouth, Norfolk.

=== 31 March ===
List of shipwrecks: 31 March 1808
Ship	State	Description
Totness	United Kingdom	The ship was driven ashore at Deal Castle, Kent. She was on a voyage from London to Dartmouth, Devon.

=== Unknown date ===
List of shipwrecks: Unknown in March date 1808
Ship	State	Description
Ann	United Kingdom	The ship was driven ashore near Wexford with the loss of two of her crew. She was on a voyage from Conwy, Denbighshire, to Neath, Glamorgan.
Argo	United Kingdom	The ship was driven ashore at Teignmouth, Devon. She was later refloated.
Atalanta	Flag unknown	The ship was lost in the Baltic Sea.
Enterprize	United Kingdom	Napoleonic Wars: The ship was captured and burnt on or about 18 March by Hermione and Hortense (both French Navy). Enterprize was on a voyage from Malta to Liverpool, Lancashire.
Hope	United Kingdom	The ship was wrecked on the Isle of Uist. She was on a voyage from New Brunswick, British North America, to Liverpool.
Joseph and Janet	United Kingdom	The ship was wrecked in the North Sea off Berwick-upon-Tweed, Northumberland. She was on a voyage from Hull, Yorkshire to Glasgow, Renfrewshire.
King George	United Kingdom	The ship was driven ashore and wrecked near Bridlington, Yorkshire.
Mentor	United States	Napoleonic Wars: The ship was captured and burnt by Hermione and Hortense (both French Navy). Mentor was on a voyage from Catalonia, Spain, to Philadelphia, Pennsylvania. Her crew were taken prisoner.
Sappho	United Kingdom	Napoleonic Wars: The ship was on a voyage from London to Madeira, Portugal, when the French Navy frigates Italienne and Sirène (French Navy) captured her. They set her on fire and sank her.
Sarah King	United Kingdom	Napoleonic Wars: The ship was captured by Italienne andSirène (both French Navy) whilst on a voyage from London to Saint Domingue. She was set afire and sunk.
Windham	United States	Napoleonic Wars: The schooner was captured by Sirène (both French Navy). She was set afire and sunk.

== April ==
=== 1 April ===
List of shipwrecks: 1 April 1808
Ship	State	Description
Governor Hunter	(United Kingdom of Great Britain and Ireland) New South Wales	The schooner was driven ashore on Badger Island in a hurricane. She was subsequently repaired and arrived at Sydney on 3 April 1810

=== 3 April ===
List of shipwrecks: 3 April 1808
Ship	State	Description
Merchant	United Kingdom	The ship was run down and sunk in the North Sea off North Shields, County Durham, with the loss of seven of her ten crew. Also reported as lost off Flamborough Head, Yorkshire.

=== 4 April ===
List of shipwrecks: 4 April 1808
Ship	State	Description
Ann	United Kingdom	The sloop was capthred in the English Channel by the privateer Actif (France): She subsequently came ashore on the south coast of the Isle of Wight.
Lovely Cruiser	United Kingdom	The ship was driven ashore and wrecked at Rame Head, Cornwall. She was on a voyage from Cork to Plymouth, Devon.
Mary	United Kingdom	The ship was wrecked near Whithorn, Wigtownshire.
Mercury	United States	The ship was in collision with a Royal Navy warship in the English Channel. She was subsequently driven onto the Goodwin Sands, Kent, United Kingdom, and wrecked. Her crew were rescued. She was on a voyage from Tenerife, Canary Islands, Spain, to London, United Kingdom.
Success	United Kingdom	The ship was driven ashore and wrecked at Rame Head. She was on a voyage from Cork to London.
William	United Kingdom	The ship ran aground off Poolbeg, County Dublin. She was on a voyage from Belfast. County Antrim to the Brazils. She was refloated.
Unnamed	United Kingdom	The brig was driven ashore at Southsea, Hampshire.
Unnamed	United States	The ship was driven ashore at Emsworth, Hampshire.
Unnamed	Portugal	The hoy was driven ashroe at Deal, Kent. She was on a voyage from Porto to London.

=== 5 April ===
List of shipwrecks: 5 April 1808
Ship	State	Description
Albion	United Kingdom	The ship was driven ashore at Portsmouth, Hampshire. She was refloated the next day.
George	United Kingdom	The ship was driven ashore and wrecked at Plymouth, Devon.
George	United Kingdom	The ship was driven ashore at Portsmouth.
Hamlet	United States	The ship was driven ashore in Pegwell Bay, Kent, United Kingdom. She later refloated and consequently sank off Ramsgate, Kent.
John	United Kingdom	The ship was driven ashore at Portsmouth. She was refloated the next day.
Lovely Cruizer	United Kingdom	The ship was driven ashore and wrecked at Ram Head, Devon. She was on a voyage from Cork to Plymouth, Devon.
Success	United Kingdom	The ship was driven ashore and wrecked at Ram Head, Devon. she was on a voyage from Cork to London.
Three Brothers	United Kingdom	The ship foundered in the English Channel off Seaford, Sussex, with the loss of all hands. She was on a voyage from Surinam to London.
Thomas and Martha	United Kingdom	The ship was driven ashore at Great Yarmouth, Norfolk. She was on a voyage from Aberdeen to Jersey, Channel Islands.
Three unnamed vessels	United Kingdom	The colliers were driven ashore at Brighton, Sussex. One of them was wrecked.

=== 7 April ===
List of shipwrecks: 7 April 1808
Ship	State	Description
Agatha	Lübeck	The ship wrecked near Memel, Prussia, with the loss of eighteen of the 29 people on board. She was on a voyage from Libau, Courland Governorate to Memel.

=== 8 April ===
List of shipwrecks: 8 April 1808
Ship	State	Description
Perseverance	United Kingdom	The brig was driven ashore and wrecked west of Sker Point, Glamorgan. All 83 [people on board were rescued. She was on a voyage from Cork to Bristol, Gloucestershire. Her cargo of whiskey was plundered by the local inhabitants, two of whom drank themselves to death.

=== 9 April ===
List of shipwrecks: 9 April 1808
Ship	State	Description
Isabella	United States	The ship was lost off Hellevoetsluis, Zeeland, Kingdom of Holland.

=== 15 April ===
List of shipwrecks: 15 April 1808
Ship	State	Description
Dryade	United Kingdom	The ship was wrecked at Marichoneal, Jamaica. Her crew were rescued. She was on a voyage from Jamaica to London.
Four Sisters	United Kingdom	The ship was run down and sunk in the Atlantic Ocean off the Eddystone Lighthouse, Cornwall. Her crew were rescued.
Nancy	United Kingdom	The ship was wrecked on Skagen, Denmark. Her crew were rescued. She was on a voyage from Great Yarmouth, Norfolk, to a Baltic Port.

=== 17 April ===
List of shipwrecks: 17 April 1808
Ship	State	Description
Chalmers	United Kingdom	The ship was wrecked on Isla Margharita.

=== 19 April ===
List of shipwrecks: 19 April 1808
Ship	State	Description
Four Sisters	United Kingdom	The ship was run down and sunk off the Eddystone Lighthouse. Her crew were rescued.
Isabella	United Kingdom	The ship was wrecked at Bervie, Aberdeenshire.

=== 20 April ===
List of shipwrecks: 20 April 1808
Ship	State	Description
HMS Widgeon	Royal Navy	The Cuckoo-class schooner was wrecked 2 nautical miles (3.7 km) north west of Banff, Aberdeenshire. Her crew were rescued.

=== 21 April ===
List of shipwrecks: 21 April 1808
Ship	State	Description
James	United Kingdom	The sloop foundered in the Atlantic Ocean off St. Ives, Cornwall. She was on a voyage from Ilfracombe, Devon, to Plymouth, Devon.

=== 22 April ===
List of shipwrecks: 22 April 1808
Ship	State	Description
HMS Bermuda	Royal Navy	The Bermuda sloop was wrecked on Memory Rock, Little Bermuda.
Hope	United Kingdom	The ship was run down and sunk by another vessel with the loss of nine of her crew.
Unnamed	United Kingdom	The sloop foundered off St. Ives, Cornwall.

=== 23 April ===
List of shipwrecks: 23 April 1808
Ship	State	Description
Elizabeth & Mary	United Kingdom	The ship was wrecked on Grand Caicos. She was on a voyage from Hayti to Jamaica and London.
Fancy	United Kingdom	The sloop was driven ashore at Cardigan. She was on a voyage from Galway to Newry, County Down.
Mary	United Kingdom	The ship was driven ashore at Goodwick, Pembrokeshire. She was on a voyage from Liverpool, Lancashire, to Penzance, Cornwall.

=== 27 April ===
List of shipwrecks: 27 April 1808
Ship	State	Description
Fame	United Kingdom	The ship sank on the Haisborough Sands, Norfolk, with the loss of a crew member. She was on a voyage from Carron, Stirlingshire, to London.

=== 28 April ===
List of shipwrecks: 28 April 1808
Ship	State	Description
Adventure	United Kingdom	The whaler was wrecked on the Goodwin Sands, Kent, with the loss of two lives. She was on a voyage from London to the South Seas. She was later beached near Margate, Kent.

=== Unknown date ===
List of shipwrecks: Unknown date in April 1808
Ship	State	Description
Apollo	United Kingdom	The ship was wrecked on the Haisborough Sands. She was on a voyage from Harwich, Essex, to Sunderland, County Durham.
Belfast	United Kingdom	The ship foundered whilst on a voyage from London to Norfolk, Virginia, United States. Her crew were rescued by an American vessel.
Boa Amazade	Portugal	The ship ran aground at Porto. She was refloated and taken in to Porto.
Brooke	United Kingdom	The ship was driven ashore at Point Corsel, Loch Ryan. She was on a voyage from Montevideo to Liverpool, Lancashire.
Chalmers	United Kingdom	The ship was wrecked on Margherita Island.
Eurydice	United Kingdom	The ship ran aground at Suriname and sprang a leak. She was on a voyage from Suriname to London. She was refloated and put back to Suriname for repairs.
Fox	United Kingdom	The ship was captured by a Spanish privateer whilst on a voyage from Malta to London. She subsequently foundered.
Harmony	United Kingdom	The ship was driven ashore in Luce Bay. She was on a voyage from Glasgow, Renfrewshire, to Liverpool.
Hermanest August	Flag unknown	The ship foundered off Marazion, Cornwall, United Kingdom, with the loss of all but two of her crew.
Lauriana	Portugal	The ship foundered in the Atlantic Ocean off Cape Trafalgar, Spain. She was on a voyage from Lisbon to Liverpool.
Lochend	United Kingdom	The ship was lost near the Mull of Kintyre, Argyllshire, with the loss of all hands.
Maria	United Kingdom	The ship was driven ashore in Stokes Bay. She was on a voyage from Londo to Prince Edward Island, British North America. She was refloated and taken in to Portsmouth, Hampshire, where she arrived on 7 April.
Paramatta	(United Kingdom of Great Britain and Ireland) New South Wales	The ship was wrecked at Cape Brett, New Zealand, after making a hasty departure from the Bay of Islands. The crew survived the wreck but were captured and killed after a violent exchange with local Māori.
Speculation	United Kingdom	The brig was driven ashore and wrecked at Kilnsea, Yorkshire. She was on a voyage from Southampton, Hampshire, to South Shields, County Durham.
William	United Kingdom	The ship foundered in the Atlantic Ocean off Lisbon, Portugal. Her crew were rescued.
192	United Kingdom	The transport ship was driven ashore near Margate, Kent. She was refloated and taken in to Ramsgate, Kent.

== May ==
=== 4 May ===
List of shipwrecks: 4 May 1808
Ship	State	Description
Fame	United Kingdom	The ship sank on the Haisborough Sands, Norfolk with the loss of a crew member. She was on a voyage from Carron, Stirlingshire to London.

=== 5 May ===
List of shipwrecks: 5 May 1808
Ship	State	Description
Adventure	United Kingdom	The ship was wrecked on the North Sand Head, off the coast of Kent with the loss of two lives. She was on a voyage from London to the South Seas.
Fairless	United Kingdom	The ship ran aground off Corton, Suffolk. She was on a voyage from South Shields, County Durham, to London. Fairless was later refloated.

=== 7 May ===
List of shipwrecks: 7 May 1808
Ship	State	Description
Boreas	Spanish Navy	War of the Fourth Coalition: The gunboat was sunk 6 nautical miles (11 km) off Cape Trafalgar in an action with HMS Redwing (Royal Navy).
Diligent	Spanish Navy	War of the Fourth Coalition: The gunboat was sunk 6 nautical miles (11 km)off Cape Trafalgar in an action with HMS Redwing (Royal Navy).
No.3	Spanish Navy	War of the Fourth Coalition: The gunboat was sunk 6 nautical miles (11 km)off Cape Trafalgar in an action with HMS Redwing (Royal Navy).
No. 6	Spanish Navy	War of the Fourth Coalition: The gunboat was sunk 6 nautical miles (11 km)off Cape Trafalgar in an action with HMS Redwing (Royal Navy).
Four unnamed vessels	Spain	War of the Fourth Coalition: The merchantmen were 6 nautical miles (11 km)sunk off Cape Trafalgar in an action with HMS Redwing (Royal Navy).

=== 9 May ===
List of shipwrecks: 9 May 1808
Ship	State	Description
Margaret	United Kingdom	The schooner was lost at Newfoundland, British North America. Her crew were rescued.

=== 12 May ===
List of shipwrecks: 12 May 1808
Ship	State	Description
Baleine	French Navy	The frigate was driven ashore in the Bay of Rosas in an action with HMS Amphion (Royal Navy).

=== 13 May ===
List of shipwrecks: 13 May 1808
Ship	State	Description
Greenfield	United Kingdom	The ship ran aground and sank on Schooner Island. Her crew were rescued. She was on a voyage from "Berry" to Alnwick, Northumberland.

=== 15 May ===
List of shipwrecks: 15 May 1808
Ship	State	Description
Nancy	United Kingdom	The ship was driven ashore and wrecked at Skagen, Denmark. Her crew were rescued.
Three unnamed vessels	United Kingdom	The ships were driven ashore and wrecked on Skagen. Their crews were rescued.

=== 18 May ===
List of shipwrecks: 18 May 1808
Ship	State	Description
HMS Rapid	Royal Navy	Napoleonic Wars: The gun-brig was sunk without loss of life by coastal artillery fire in the Tagus off southern Portugal. Her crew were rescued by the brig-sloop HMS Primrose (Royal Navy).

=== 19 May ===
List of shipwrecks: 19 May 1808
Ship	State	Description
Minerva	United Kingdom	The ship was wrecked on Great Saltee Island, County Donegal. She was on a voyage from Youghall, County Cork to Whitehaven, Cumberland.

=== 22 May ===
List of shipwrecks: 22 May 1808
Ship	State	Description
Hope	United Kingdom	The ship was run down and sunk with the loss of nine of her crew.

=== 29 May ===
List of shipwrecks: 29 May 1808
Ship	State	Description
Young Charles	United Kingdom	The ship lost her mainmast and was abandoned by her crew. She was taken in to Appledore, Devon by HMRC Shark (United Kingdom.

=== Unknown date ===
List of shipwrecks: Unknown date in May 1808
Ship	State	Description
Amelia	United Kingdom	The ship was driven ashore and damaged near Holyhead, Anglesey. She was on a voyage from Padstow, Cornwall, to Liverpool, Lancashire. Amelia was later refloated and taken in to Holyhead.
Fox	United Kingdom	The ship was captured by a Spanish privateer but subsequently foundered. She was on a voyage from Malta to London.
Justitia Rond Tonder	Flag unknown	The ship ran aground off Margate, Kent, United Kingdom. She was on a voyage from London, United Kingdom to Georgia. She was refloated on 27 May and taken in to the River Thames.
Matty	United Kingdom	The ship ran aground on the Tusker Rock. She was refloated and taken in to Wexford.
Vengeance	France	The privateer was sunk off Guadeloupe by a Royal Navy ship with the loss of all 180 crew.
Young Charles	United Kingdom	The ship was dismasted in the Bristol Channel and was abandoned by her crew. She was later towed in to Appledore, Devon, by HMRC Shark ( Board of Customs).

== June ==
=== 14 June ===
List of shipwrecks: 14 June 1808
Ship	State	Description
Ann	(United Kingdom of Great Britain and Ireland) Jamaica	Napoleonic Wars: The ship was driven ashore by a French privateer and wrecked.

=== 15 June ===
List of shipwrecks: 15 June 1808
Ship	State	Description
Hebe	United Kingdom	The ship struck a reef off Port Dalrymple, Van Diemen's Land, New South Wales, with the loss of a crew member.

=== 16 June ===
List of shipwrecks: 16 June 1808
Ship	State	Description
HM Hired armed ship Harelequin	Royal Navy	The ship was driven ashore between Cowes and Yarmouth, Isle of Wight.
Robert	United Kingdom	The schooner was wrecked off Marichoneal Harbour, Jamaica.

=== 18 June ===
List of shipwrecks: 18 June 1808
Ship	State	Description
Aid	United Kingdom	The ship was driven ashore on Red Island, in the Saint Lawrence River. She was refloated and taken in to Quebec, British North America.
Prospect	United Kingdom	The ship was driven ashore on Red Island. She was refloated and taken in to Quebec.
Young John	United Kingdom	The ship was wrecked on Red Island. Her crew were rescued.

=== 30 June ===
List of shipwrecks: 30 June 1808
Ship	State	Description
HMS Capelin	Royal Navy	The Ballahoo-class schooner struck the Parquette Rock, in the Bay of Biscay off Brest, Finistère, France, and consequently foundered. Her crew were rescued by HM Hired armed cutter Adrian, HMS Champion, HMS Entreprenante, HMS Sybille and HMS Whiting (all Royal Navy).
HSwMS No. 33	Swedish Navy	Finnish War: The gunboat was sunk off Rymättlyä, Grand Duchy of Finland in an engagement with Imperial Russian Navy ships. Four of her crew were killed.

=== Unknown date ===
List of shipwrecks: Unknown date in June 1808
Ship	State	Description
Charlotte	United Kingdom	The ship was abandoned off Buchan Ness, Aberdeenshire, when her crew spotted a vessel they supposed to be a privateer. She was on a voyage from Gothenburg, Sweden, to Leith, Lothian.
Eliza	United States	The brig was wrecked south-southwest of Narai Island in Fiji in the Pacific Ocean. One of her crew was lost.
Neptune	United Kingdom	Napoleonic Wars: The ship was captured and scuttled by Milan (French Navy). She was on a voyage from Gibraltar to Jersey, Channel Islands.
St. Thomas's	United Kingdom	The sloop was driven ashore and wrecked near Aldeburgh, Suffolk.

== July ==
=== 10 July ===
List of shipwrecks: 10 July 1808
Ship	State	Description
HMS Netley	Royal Navy	The brig capsized off Barbados with the loss of all but nine of her crew. Survivors were rescued by HMS Julia (Royal Navy).

=== 14 July ===
List of shipwrecks: 14 July 1808
Ship	State	Description
Stag	United Kingdom	The schooner was driven ashore and wrecked at Roseau, Dominica.

=== 19 July ===
List of shipwrecks: 19 July 1808
Ship	State	Description
Chiswick	United Kingdom	The ship was wrecked at Aux Cayes, Hispaniola.

=== 21 July ===
List of shipwrecks: 21 July 1808
Ship	State	Description
Hiram	United States	The ship was wrecked on Abaco. She was on a voyage from New York to Havana, Cuba.

=== 27 July ===
List of shipwrecks: 27 July 1808
Ship	State	Description
HMS Pickle	Royal Navy	The topsail schooner was wrecked off Cape Santa Maria, Spain. Her crew survived.

=== 30 July ===
List of shipwrecks: 30 July 1808
Ship	State	Description
HMS Meleager	Royal Navy	The Perseverance-class frigate was wrecked on the Barr Bush Keys, off Port Royal, Jamaica, with the loss of three of her crew.

=== Unknown date ===
List of shipwrecks: Unknown date in July 1808
Ship	State	Description
Bayley	United Kingdom	The ship was wrecked on Langness Point, Isle of Man. Her crew were rescued. She was on a voyage from Liverpool, Lancashire, to Gothenburg, Sweden.
Courier	United Kingdom	The sloop sprang a leak and put into Whitby, Yorkshire, where she sank. She was on a voyage from Newcastle upon Tyne, Northumberland, to Sandwich, Kent.
Juno	United Kingdom	Gunboat War: The ship was captured and burnt off Dragør, Denmark, by the Danes.

== August ==
=== 3 August ===
List of shipwrecks: 3 August 1808
Ship	State	Description
Unnamed	(France) First French Empire	The ship ran aground near Livorno in an action with HMS Kent and HMS Wizard (both Royal Navy) and was burnt.

=== 3 August ===
List of shipwrecks: 3 August 1808
Ship	State	Description
Robert and Jane	United Kingdom	The ship was wrecked on the Haisborough Sands, in the North Sea off the coast of Norfolk. Her crew were rescued. She was on a voyage from South Shields, County Durham, to London.

=== 7 August ===
List of shipwrecks: 7 August 1808
Ship	State	Description
HMS Delphinen	Royal Navy	The Lougen-class brig was wrecked on the Dutch coast. Her crew were rescued but taken prisoner.

=== 8 August ===
List of shipwrecks: 8 August 1808
Ship	State	Description
HMS Jaseur	Royal Navy	The ship-sloop departed Calcutta for Prince of Wales Island. She subsequently foundered with the loss of all hands.

=== 11 August ===
List of shipwrecks: 11 August 1808
Ship	State	Description
Unnamed	United Kingdom	The brig foundered in the Sleeve. Her crew were rescued. She was on a voyage from London to Gothenburg, Sweden.

=== 12 August ===
List of shipwrecks: 12 August 1808
Ship	State	Description
Helena	Sweden	The ship departed from Dalarö for Grimsby, Lincolnshire, United Kingdom. No further trace, presumed foundered with the loss of all hands.
Venture	United Kingdom	The ship sprang a leak and foundered. Her crew were rescued. She was on a voyage from London to Gothenburg, Sweden.

=== 18 August ===
List of shipwrecks: 18 August 1808
Ship	State	Description
Diana (Диана)	Imperial Russian Navy	The brig was driven ashore at the mouth of the Sulina branch of the Danube and was abandoned by her crew. After refloating, she immediately foundered, and on 5 September was again brought ashore and wrecked.
Hermione	French Navy	The Hortense-class frigate was lost in the Iroise Sea.

=== 20 August ===
List of shipwrecks: 20 August 1808
Ship	State	Description
Vicissitude	United Kingdom	The ship ran aground on the Goodwin Sands, Kent. She was refloated.

=== 22 August ===
List of shipwrecks: 22 August 1808
Ship	State	Description
Tentacão	Portugal	The ship was wrecked at Cape Henry, Virginia. She was on a voyage from Madeira to Baltimore, Maryland, United States.

=== 23 August ===
List of shipwrecks: 23 August 1808
Ship	State	Description
Eliza	Flag unknown	The ship was driven ashore near Deal, Kent, United Kingdom. She was on a voyage from Amsterdam, North Holland, Kingdom of Holland to Boston.

=== 24 August ===
List of shipwrecks: 24 August 1808
Ship	State	Description
Vsevolod	Imperial Russian Navy	Vsevolod. Anglo-Russian War: The 74-gun ship of the line ran aground in the Baltic Sea while in combat with the 74-gun third rate HMS Implacable (Royal Navy). The frigate Poluks (Imperial Russian Navy) towed her off, but Vsevolod ran aground again later the same day near Baltiski, about 6 nautical miles (11 km; 6.9 mi) from Rager Vik. While still aground, she was captured on 25 August by HMS Implacable and the 74-gun third rate HMS Centaur (Royal Navy). The British set the grounded Vsevolod afire and destroyed her on 26 August.

=== 25 August ===
List of shipwrecks: 25 August 1808
Ship	State	Description
HMS Centaur	Royal Navy	Anglo-Russian War: The 74-gun third rate ran aground in the Baltic Sea near Baltiski, about 6 nautical miles (11 km; 6.9 mi) from Rager Vik, while in combat with the grounded 74-gun ship of the line Vsevolod (Imperial Russian Navy). The 74-gun third rate HMS Implacable (Royal Navy) hauled her off.
George	United Kingdom	The ship departed from the Nore for Gothenburg, Sweden. No further trace, presumed foundered with the loss of all hands.

=== 27 August ===
List of shipwrecks: 27 August 1808
Ship	State	Description
Charlotte	(United Kingdom of Great Britain and Ireland) New South Wales	The sloop capsized in a squall 5 nautical miles (9.3 km) north of Port Jackson, New South Wales, Australia, with the loss of both members of her crew.

=== Unknown date ===
List of shipwrecks: Unknown date in August 1808
Ship	State	Description
Albion	United Kingdom	The ship foundered whilst on a voyage from the Cape of Good Hope to London. Part of the crew arrived at Rio de Janeiro.
Catherina	United Kingdom	The ship sprang a leak and was beached between Malmö and Ystad, Sweden. She was on a voyage from London to Stockholm, Sweden.
Dundee	(United Kingdom of Great Britain and Ireland) New South Wales	The ship foundered at the mouth of the Hunter River with the loss of two of her crew.
Nossa Senhora de Conceico	Portugal	The ship was wrecked at Falmouth, Cornwall, United Kingdom. She was on a voyage from Bristol, Gloucestershire, United Kingdom, to Brazil.
Richard and Sarah	United Kingdom	The ship departed from Weymouth, Dorset, for London. No further trace, presumed foundered with the loss of all hands.
Sarah & Elizabeth	United Kingdom	Napoleonic Wars: The ship was captured and burnt by Pelade (France). She was on a voyage from Barbados to Bermuda.
Unnamed	United Kingdom	The wherry was wrecked off Huskar, Outer Hebrides with the loss of three of her four crew. She was on a voyage from North Uist to Huskar.

== September ==
=== 1 September ===
List of shipwrecks: 1 September 1808
Ship	State	Description
Aurora	United Kingdom	The ship was run ashore near Eastbourne, Sussex, to avoid three French privateers. She was on a voyage from Newport, Monmouthshire, to Chatham, Kent. Aurora was refloated on 4 September.

=== 10 September ===
List of shipwrecks: 10 September 1808
Ship	State	Description
Dove	United Kingdom	The ship was driven ashore at Wexford. She was on a voyage from Wexford to Swansea, Glamorgan. Dove was later refloated and taken in to Wexford.

=== 12 September ===
List of shipwrecks: 12 September 1808
Ship	State	Description
Mary	United Kingdom	The ship was wrecked at Baltimore, Maryland.

=== 24 September ===
List of shipwrecks: 24 September 1808
Ship	State	Description
Canada	United Kingdom	The ship was driven ashore and severely damaged. She was on a voyage from Quebec, British North America to London. She was refloated and towed in to Harwich, Essex by HMRC Lapwing ( Board of Customs).
Mary Ann (or Maryann)	United Kingdom	The ship foundered in the Atlantic Ocean (42°14′N 41°35′W) while sailing from Jamaica to London. Brook Watson rescued her crew (United Kingdom).

=== 20 September ===
List of shipwrecks: 20 September 1808
Ship	State	Description
Geroy (Герой, 'Hero')	Imperial Russian Navy	The frigate was driven ashore at Baltiski. She refloated the next day, but had to be beached and abandoned due to a heavy leak and subsequently became a wreck.

=== 25 September ===
List of shipwrecks: 25 September 1808
Ship	State	Description
Sisters	United Kingdom	The ship struck rocks and foundered 3 leagues (9 nautical miles (17 km)) off Grand Manan Island with the loss of sixteen of her 22 crew. She was on a voyage from Greenock, Renfrewshire, to St. John's, Newfoundland, British North America.

=== 27 September ===
List of shipwrecks: 27 September 1808
Ship	State	Description
Brothers	United Kingdom	The brig was wrecked on the Corton Sand, in the North Sea off the coast of Suffolk. Her crew were rescued.

=== 29 September ===
List of shipwrecks: 29 September 1808
Ship	State	Description
HMS Maria	Royal Navy	The gun-brig was captured by the corvette Départment des Landes (French Navy) off Guadeloupe and was beached by her French prize crew to prevent her from sinking due to damage she sustained in combat with Départment des Landes.

=== 30 September ===
List of shipwrecks: 30 September 1808
Ship	State	Description
Providence	United Kingdom	The ship foundered in the Irish Sea. Her crew were rescued by Jemima (United Kingdom). Providence was on a voyage from Waterford to Swansea, Glamorgan.
Virginia	United States	The ship was lost near Trondheim, Norway, with the loss of all but two of her crew.

=== Unknown date ===
List of shipwrecks: Unknown date in September 1808
Ship	State	Description
Alexander	United Kingdom	The ship foundered in the North Sea. She was on a voyage from Gothenburg, Sweden, to Belfast, County Down.
Charlotte	(United Kingdom of Great Britain and Ireland) New South Wales	The ship was lost in late September with some loss of life.
Fortuna	Sweden	The ship departed from Gothenburg for Visby. No further trace, presumed foundered with the loss of all hands.
Juliana	United States	The ship was captured by four French Navy warships and was scuttled. She was on a voyage from Saint Thomas, Virgin Islands to New York. Juliana was later discovered at sea by a Royal Navy frigate and was taken in to Saint Kitts.
Phœnix	United Kingdom	The ship struck the pier and sank at Dover, Kent. She was on a voyage from London to Dover.

== October ==
=== 5 October ===
List of shipwrecks: 5 October 1808
Ship	State	Description
Prosperous	United Kingdom	The ship was wrecked at Scarborough, Yorkshire. Her crew were rescued.

=== 7 October ===
List of shipwrecks: 7 October 1808
Ship	State	Description
Adventure	United Kingdom	The ship was driven ashore in the River Mersey. She was on a voyage from Liverpool to Cork.
Ann and Sarah	United Kingdom	The ship was driven ashore and wrecked at Bideford, Devon.
Apollo	United Kingdom	The ship was wrecked at Liverpool with the loss of all hands. She was on a voyage from Liverpool to London.
Ardent	United Kingdom	The ship was driven ashore at Parkgate, Cheshire. Her crew were rescued. She was on a voyage from Liverpool to Dublin.
Ariel	United Kingdom	The ship was driven ashore near Liverpool. She was later refloated.
Bee	United Kingdom	The ship was driven ashore at Parkgate.
Catherine Brigetta	Flag unknown	The ship was sighted in the Dogger Bank. No further trace, presumed foundered with the loss of all hands.
Defence	United Kingdom	The ship was driven ashore at Parkgate. She was on a voyage from Londonderry to Chester, Cheshire.
Endeavour	United Kingdom	The sloop was driven ashore in the River Mersey. She was on a voyage from Cork to Liverpool.
Experiment	United Kingdom	The ship was driven ashore at Parkgate. She was on a voyage from Belfast to Chester.
Fletcher	United Kingdom	The ship was wrecked at North Meols, Lancashire, with the loss of all hands. She was on a voyage from Liverpool to Heligoland.
George	United Kingdom	The ship was driven ashore near Liverpool. She was later refloated.
Hannah	United Kingdom	The ship was driven ashore and wrecked in the River Mersey. She was on a voyage from Liverpool to Jamaica. She refloated on 18 October, drifted upstream in a capsized state.
Hibernia	United Kingdom	The ship was wrecked in Loch Indaal. Her 70 passengers, and the crew were rescued. She was on a voyage from Londonderry to Philadelphia, Pennsylvania, United States. She was on refloated in November 1809 and taken in to Greenock, Renfrewshire, where she arrived on the 11th of that month. She was refloated in November 1809.
Hopewell	United Kingdom	The ship was wrecked at Ayr. Her crew were rescued. She was on a voyage from Quebec, British North America, to Ayr.
Industry	United Kingdom	The ship was driven ashore and damaged at Liverpool whilst on a voyage from Liverpool to Spain. She was later refloated.
Isabella	United Kingdom	The sloop was driven ashore at Fraserburgh, Aberdeenshire. Her crew were rescued by the Fraserburgh Lifeboat.
Jolly Major	United Kingdom	The sloop was driven ashore at Greenock.
Juno	United Kingdom	The ship was lost near Liverpool. She was on a voyage from Liverpool to London.
King George	United Kingdom	The ship was driven ashore at Parkgate. Her crew were rescued. She was on a voyage from Liverpool to Dublin.
Mars	United Kingdom	The ship ran aground at Greenock. She was refloated.
Mentor	United Kingdom	The brig was driven ashore in the River Mersey. She was on a voyage from Dublin to Liverpool.
Neptune	United Kingdom	The ship was driven ashore in the River Mersey. She was on a voyage from Liverpool to Berbice or Demerara. Neptune was later refloated.
Phillipsburg	United States	The ship was driven ashore and damaged at Liverpool. She was on a voyage from Liverpool to New York.
Pomona	United Kingdom	The brig foundered in Liverpool Bay off Hoylake.
Princess of Wales	United Kingdom	The ship was driven ashore and wrecked at North Battery, Liverpool. She was on a voyage from Liverpool to Brazil. She refloated on 18 October and drifted out to sea.
Princess Royal	United Kingdom	The ship was driven ashore at Parkgate. She was on a voyage from Belfast to Chester.
Sedulous	United Kingdom	The ship was driven ashore at Parkgate.
Shannon	United Kingdom	The ship was driven ashore at Greenock.
Three Brothers	United Kingdom	The transport ship foundered whilst on a voyage from Portugal to France with the loss of 283 of the 293 people on board. Survivors were rescued by Alert (United Kingdom). Date also reported as 27 September.
Tiger	United Kingdom	The ship was driven ashore at Liverpool. She was on a voyage from Liverpool to Portugal.

=== 8 October ===
List of shipwrecks: 8 October 1808
Ship	State	Description
Active	United Kingdom	The ship was wrecked on the Kentish Knock. Her crew were rescued.
Alexander	United Kingdom	The ship was wrecked in the River Mersey. She was on a voyage from Liverpool, Lancashire, to Brazil.
Bee	United Kingdom	The schooner caught fire in the North Sea off Tod Head, Berwickshire. She was beached at Berwick-upon-Tweed, Northumberland where she was wrecked. Her crew were rescued. Bee was on a voyage from Newcastle-upon-Tyne, Northumberland, to Aberdeen.
Catherine	United Kingdom	The ship was driven ashore at Whitehaven, Cumberland. She was on a voyage from Sligo to Liverpool. Catherine was later refloated and taken in to Whitehaven.
Ceres	United Kingdom	The ship foundered in the North Sea off Aberdeen with the loss of eight of her thirteen crew. Survivors were rescued by HMS Cygnet (Royal Navy). Ceres was on a voyage from Pictou, Nova Scotia, British North America, to London.
Comet	United Kingdom	The brig was wrecked at Ballycastle, County Antrim, with the loss of eight of her crew.
Contest	Sweden	The galiot foundered in Bighouse Bay, Sutherland, United Kingdom, with the loss of all hands. She was on a voyage from Liverpool, Lancashire, United Kingdom, to Gothenburg.
Fielding	United Kingdom	The brigantine was driven ashore in Torrisdale Bay She was on a voyage from Greenock, Renfrewshire, to Gothenburg, Sweden. She was later refloated and put into Burnt Island, Fife.
Friendship	United Kingdom	The sloop foundered in the North Sea off Arbroath, Forfarshire.
Freemason	United Kingdom	The sloop was driven ashore and wrecked at Bridlington, Yorkshire. Her crew were rescued by the Bridlington Lifeboat.
Jane	United Kingdom	The ship foundered in the Irish Sea off Anglesey. Her crew were rescued.
John	United Kingdom	The brig was driven ashore and wrecked at Peterhead, Aberdeenshire. Her crew were rescued.
Lizard	United Kingdom	The sloop was driven ashore 2 nautical miles (3.7 km) north of Peterhead and wrecked. She was on a voyage from Sunderland, County Durham, to Newburgh, Forfarshire.
Mary	United Kingdom	The brig was driven ashore and severely damaged at Leith, Lothian. Her crew were rescued. She was on a voyage from Dundee, Forfarshire, to Gothenburg, Sweden. She was refloated on 10 October and taken in to Leith.
Neptune	United Kingdom	The ship was driven ashore at Montrose, Forfarshire. She was on a voyage from Milton Regis, Kent to Aberdeen.
Peggies	United Kingdom	The ship was driven ashore at Fisherrow, Lothian. She was later refloated.
Supply	United Kingdom	The schooner foundered off Bighouse. Her crew were rescued.
Supply	United Kingdom	The schooner was driven ashore near Tongue, Sutherland. Her crew were rescued.
Three Brothers	United Kingdom	The ship was driven ashore and wrecked at Barnstaple, Devon.
Unity	United Kingdom	The ship was wrecked near Bangor, County Down. Her crew were rescued. She was on a voyage from Belfast to Workington, Cumberland.
Unnamed	United Kingdom	The sloop was wrecked near Newhaven, Lothian.
Unnamed	United Kingdom	The sloop was driven ashore at Prestonpans, Lothian.

=== 9 October ===
List of shipwrecks: 9 October 1808
Ship	State	Description
Atlas	United Kingdom	The ship was driven ashore on Heligoland.
Ephron	United Kingdom	The ship was driven ashore at Benion Strand, County Donegal. She was on a voyage from Saint John, New Brunswick, British North America, to Liverpool, Lancashire.
Nelly	United Kingdom	The ship was driven ashore on Heligoland.

=== 12 October ===
List of shipwrecks: 12 October 1808
Ship	State	Description
Diana	United Kingdom	The ship was sighted by Doncaster whilst on a voyage from London to Quebec City, Lower Canada, British North America. No further trace, presumed foundered with the loss of all hands.

=== 13 October ===
List of shipwrecks: 13 October 1808
Ship	State	Description
Vrow Albertina	Heligoland	The crewless ship was driven out to sea from Heligoland and subsequently foundered.

=== 14 October ===
List of shipwrecks: 14 October 1808
Ship	State	Description
Gage	United Kingdom	The ship was driven ashore at Newhaven, Sussex.
Nile	United Kingdom	The ship was driven ashore at Newhaven. She was on a voyage from London to Poole, Dorset.
Old Emperor	United Kingdom	The ship was drivn ashore at Paull, Yorkshire.

=== 15 October ===
List of shipwrecks: 15 October 1808
Ship	State	Description
Hyena	United Kingdom	The ship foundered off Falmouth, Cornwall. Her crew were rescued. She was on a voyage from Falmouth to Guernsey, Channel Islands.
James	United Kingdom	The ship ran aground on the Herd Sand, in the North Sea off the coast of County Durham. She was refloated.
John	United Kingdom	The brig was driven ashore and wrecked at Peterhead, Aberdeenshire. Her crew were rescued.
John and Isabella	United Kingdom	The brigantine was driven ashore and wrecked on Lindisfarne, Northumberland Her crew were rescued. She was on a voyage from Frazerburgh, Aberdeenshire to Aberdeen.
Lizard	United Kingdom	The sloop was driven ashore and wrecked at Peterhead. Her crew were rescued.
Ratcliff	United Kingdom	The ship ran aground on the Herd Sand. She was refloated.
Success	United Kingdom	The ship ran aground on the Herd Sand. She was refloated.
True Briton	United Kingdom	The ship ran aground on the Herd Sand. She was refloated.
Two Sisters	United Kingdom	The ship ran aground on the Herd Sand. She was refloated.

=== 16 October ===
List of shipwrecks: 17 October 1808
Ship	State	Description
Joseph & Lois	United Kingdom	The ship was lost on Little Islands. She was on a voyage from Hayti to Halifax, Nova Scotia, British North America.
Lovely	United Kingdom	The ship departed from Sydney, Nova Scotia, for Quebec City, Lower Canada. No further trace, presumed foundered with the loss of all hands.

=== 17 October ===
List of shipwrecks: 17 October 1808
Ship	State	Description
Lark	United Kingdom	The ship foundered in the Irish Sea off Great Orme, Caernarfonshire, with the loss off all hands.

=== 18 October ===
List of shipwrecks: 18 October 1808
Ship	State	Description
Peggy	United Kingdom	The ship was run down and sunk in the North Sea off Orfordness, Suffolk, by Neptune (United Kingdom). Her crew were rescued by Neptune.
Vrouw Albertina	Heligoland	The crewless ship was driven out to sea from Heligoland and foundered.

=== 20 October ===
List of shipwrecks: 20 October 1808
Ship	State	Description
Brilliant	United Kingdom	The ship was driven ashore near Whitehaven, Cumberland. She was refloated and taken in to Whitehaven.
Brothers	United Kingdom	The sloop was wrecked near the Ross of Kirkcudbright, Kirkcudbrightshire. Her crew were rescued. She was on a voyage from Greenock, Renfrewshire, to Ulverston, Lancashire.
Carrier	United Kingdom	The ship was driven ashore near Whitehaven. She was refloated and taken in to Whitehaven.
Concordia	(Netherlands) Kingdom of Holland	The brig was wrecked on the Saltees Rocks with the loss of two of her eleven crew. She was on a voyage from Livorno, Kingdom of Etruria, to Dublin.
Friendship	United Kingdom	The ship was driven ashore at Docking, Norfolk Her crew survived. She was on a voyage from Hull, Yorkshire to London.
John	United Kingdom	The brig was run down and sunk in the English Channel off Dungeness, Kent. Her crew were rescued. She was on a voyage from Sunderland, County Durham, to Portsmouth, Hampshire.
Nelly and Peggy	United Kingdom	The ship was driven ashore and wrecked at Leith, Lothian. Her crew were rescued by the Leith Lifeboat.
Majestic	United Kingdom	The transport ship was destroyed by fire at Barbados.
William	United Kingdom	The ship was driven ashore and sunk at Dungeness. She was refloated two days later and taken in to Dover, Kent. She was on a voyage from London to Carmarthen.

=== 21 October ===
List of shipwrecks: 21 October 1808
Ship	State	Description
Amphitrite	United Kingdom	The ship was driven ashore at Pictou, Nova Scotia, British North America. Her crew were rescued. She was on a voyage from Bedec, Prince Edward Island, to Halifax, Nova Scotia. Amphitrite was refloated on 6 November was later driven ashore at Bedec. Her crew were rescued.
John	United Kingdom	The brig was run down and sunk in the English Channel off Dungeness, Kent. Her crew were rescued. She was on a voyage from Sunderland, County Durham, to Portsmouth, Hampshire.
Neath Castle	United Kingdom	The ship was driven ashore at Bridlington, Yorkshire.

=== 22 October ===
List of shipwrecks: 22 October 1808
Ship	State	Description
Argus (Аргус)	Imperial Russian Navy	Finnish War: The frigate ran aground on et:Kuradimuna bank near Prangli in the Gulf of Finland and was wrecked by 25 October. Her crew were rescued. She was on a voyage from Sveaborg to Reval.
Friendship	United Kingdom	The ship foundered in the North Sea off Wells-next-the-Sea, Norfolk. Her crew survived. She was on a voyage from Hull, Yorkshire to London.

=== 23 October ===
List of shipwrecks: 23 October 1808
Ship	State	Description
Admecus	United Kingdom	The brig was driven ashore at Dymchurch, Kent.
Cicero	United Kingdom	The collier foundered in The Downs.
Fanny	United Kingdom	The ship ran aground on the Fairness Rock, off the Kent coast. She was refloated on 24 October and taken in to Margate, Kent. Fanny was on a voyage from Wexford to London.
George and Ann	United Kingdom	The ship foundered in Bigbury Bay.
Unity	United Kingdom	The brig foundered in the English Channel east of Dungeness, Kent.
HMS Volador	Royal Navy	The brig-sloop wrecked on a reef in Gulf of Cora in the Caribbean. She was abandoned the next day. Her crew were rescued.
York	United Kingdom	The sloop was wrecked on the coast of Norfolk. Her crew survived. She was on a voyage from Lancaster, Lancashire, to Hull, Yorkshire.
Unnamed	France	The privateer, a lugger, foundered in Bigbury Bay.

=== 24 October ===
List of shipwrecks: 24 October 1808
Ship	State	Description
Admetis	United Kingdom	The ship was driven ashore and wreckwed at Hythe, Kent. She was on a voyage from Sunderland, County Durham, to Exeter, Devon.
Balsamao	United Kingdom	The ship was driven ashore at Deal, Kent.
Canada	United Kingdom	The ship was driven ashore at Deal.
Cicero	United Kingdom	The collier foundered in The Downs.
Helen	United Kingdom	The ship was driven ashore at Deal.
Principe Atalanta	United Kingdom	The ship was driven ashore at Deal.
St. Marcus	Portugal	The ship was driven ashore and wrecked at Margate, Kent.
Unity	United Kingdom	The ship foundered in the English Channel off Dungeness, Kent.

=== 25 October ===
List of shipwrecks: 25 October 1808
Ship	State	Description
Ceres	United Kingdom	The ship was driven onto rocks at South Shields, County Durham, and wrecked. Her crew were rescued.
Good Intent	United Kingdom	The sloop was driven onto rocks at South Shields and wrecked. Her crew were rescued.
John	United Kingdom	The brig was wrecked near Peterhead, Aberdeenshire.
Lizard	United Kingdom	The ship was wrecked near Peterhead.
Sir Sidney Smith	United Kingdom	The ship was wrecked inn Widewal Bay, Orkney Islands. Her crew were rescued. She was on a voyage from a Swedish port to Liverpool, Lancashire.
Sarah	United Kingdom	The ship was driven onto rocks at South Shields and wrecked. Her crew were rescued.

=== 26 October ===
List of shipwrecks: 26 October 1808
Ship	State	Description
HMS Crane	Royal Navy	The Cuckoo-class schooner was driven ashore at Plymouth Hoe, Devon. She refloated but subsequently sank. Her crew were rescued.
Mathew	United Kingdom	The ship was driven ashore and wrecked on the coast of Norway. Her crew were rescued but made prisoner. She was on a voyage from London to Gothenburg, Sweden.
Ruby	United Kingdom	The sloop was wrecked 4 nautical miles (7.4 km) south of Portpatrick, Wigtownshire, with the loss of all five of her crew. She was on a voyage from Port Glasgow, Renfrewshire, to Bristol, Gloucestershire.
Vedra	United Kingdom	The ship was driven ashore and wrecked at Lytham, Lancashire. She was on a voyage from Malta to Liverpool, Lancashire.
Unnamed	United Kingdom	The collier sank in Pegwell Bay.
Unnamed	United Kingdom	The collier was beached near Broadstairs, Kent.

=== 28 October ===
List of shipwrecks: 28 October 1808
Ship	State	Description
Admetis	United Kingdom	The ship was driven ashore and wrecked near Hythe, Kent. She was on a voyage from Sunderland, County Durham to Exeter, Devon.

=== 29 October ===
List of shipwrecks: 29 October 1808
Ship	State	Description
HMS Banterer	Royal Navy	The Banterer-class post ship was wrecked in the Saint Lawrence River.

=== 30 October ===
List of shipwrecks: 30 October 1808
Ship	State	Description
Acorn	United Kingdom	The ship capsized and sank with the loss of most of her crew. She was on a voyage from the United States to Stockton-on-Tees, Yorkshire.

=== 31 October ===
List of shipwrecks: 31 October 1808
Ship	State	Description
Hope	Sweden	The ship was wrecked 12 nautical miles (22 km) from Lisbon, Portugal. Her crew were rescued. She was on a voyage from Lisbon to Gothenburg.

=== Unknown date ===
List of shipwrecks: Unknown date in October 1808
Ship	State	Description
Alexander	United Kingdom	The ship departed from the Bay of Fundy for Aberdeen. No further trace, presumed foundered with the loss of all hands.
Ann	United Kingdom	The ship foundered in the North Sea. Her crew were rescued by Kitty (United Kingdom).
Comet	United Kingdom	The ship foundered off Belfast, County Antrim.
Dowson	United Kingdom	The transport ship was driven ashore on Goose Island. She was on a voyage from Quebec to Halifax, Nova Scotia, British North America. She was refloated and put back to Quebec for repairs.
Eliza	United Kingdom	The ship was driven ashore at Halifax, Nova Scotia. She was on a voyage from Aberdeen to Pictou, Nova Scotia.
Endeavour	United Kingdom	The ship was driven ashore at Bridlington, Yorkshire. She was later refloated.
Fame	United Kingdom	The transport ship was wrecked on the French coast with the loss of all hands.
Freemason	United Kingdom	The ship foundered in the North Sea off Bridlington, Yorkshire. Her crew were rescued by the Bridlington Lifeboat.
Industry	United Kingdom	The ship was driven ashore at Great Yarmouth, Norfolk.
Industry	United Kingdom	The ship departed from Longhope Orkney Islands for Gothenburg, Sweden. No further trace, presumed foundered with the loss of all hands.
Intercourse	United Kingdom	The ship was driven ashore on the coast of Norfolk. She was on a voyage from Leith, Lothian to Cádiz, Spain. She had been refloated by 1 November and taken in to Great Yarmouth.
Myrtle	United Kingdom	The ship was wrecked on the Cornish coast with the loss of all hands. She was on a voyage from Lancaster, Lancashire, to London.
Pallas	United Kingdom	The ship ran aground at St. Asaph, Denbighshire. She was on a voyage from Liverpool, Lancashire, to Cork.
Ruby	United Kingdom	The ship was driven ashore and wrecked on the coast of County Donegal. Her crew were rescued. She was on a voyage from Quebec, British North America, to Liverpool.
St. Nicholas	Imperial Russian Navy	The ship of the line ran aground near Malmö, Sweden, during an engagement with Dano-Norwegian Navy gunboats. She was set afire and destroyed by her crew.
Two unnamed vessels	United Kingdom	War of the Fourth Coalition: The ships were driven ashore near Malmö, Sweden by the Danish and were burnt.

== November ==
=== 1 November ===
List of shipwrecks: 1 November 1808
Ship	State	Description
Nancy	United Kingdom	The ship was wrecked on the coast of Galicia, Spain, with the loss of two of her crew. She was on a voyage from Malta to London.
True Briton	United Kingdom	The schooner ran aground at Dover, Kent. She was refloated, but collided with the pier and was severely damaged.

=== 2 November ===
List of shipwrecks: 2 November 1808
Ship	State	Description
HMS Delphinen	Royal Navy	The ship was wrecked on the Dutch coast.

=== 4 November ===
List of shipwrecks: 4 November 1808
Ship	State	Description
Friendship	United Kingdom	The transport ship departed from A Coruña, Spain. No further trace, presumed foundered with the loss of all on board.

=== 7 November ===
List of shipwrecks: 7 November 1808
Ship	State	Description
Travers	British East India Company	The wreck of Travers The East Indiaman struck a rock off Sunken Island (15°38′N 94°20′E), near Diamond Island (Myanmar), and foundered with the loss of sixteen lives. Earl Spencer and Monarch (both British East India Company), rescued the survivors.

=== 10 November ===
List of shipwrecks: 10 November 1808
Ship	State	Description
George	United Kingdom	The collier was wrecked on the Mouse Sand, in the Thames Estuary off Sheerness, Kent. Her crew were rescued
Jane	United Kingdom	The ship was driven ashore at Banff, Aberdeenshire.
Maida	United Kingdom	The brig was abandoned off Staithes, Yorkshire. She was reboarded on 12 November and resumed her voyage.
Pomona	United Kingdom	The ship was wrecked at Banff. Her crew were rescued. She was on a voyage from Liverpool, Lancashire, to Leith, Lothian.
Sarah	United Kingdom	The collier was wrecked on the Mouse Sand. Her crew were rescued.

=== 11 November ===
List of shipwrecks: 11 November 1808
Ship	State	Description
Cato	United States	The ship was wrecked on Sandy Hook, New Jersey.

=== 12 November ===
List of shipwrecks: 12 November 1808
Ship	State	Description
Hiram	United Kingdom	Napoleonic Wars: The ship was captured by Vénus (French Navy) whilst on a voyage from St. Ubes, Portugal, to Cork. She was set afire and sunk.
Thames	United Kingdom	Napoleonic Wars: The ship was captured and burnt by Surveillante (French Navy). She was on a voyage from Surinam to London.

=== 13 November ===
List of shipwrecks: 13 November 1808
Ship	State	Description
Albion	United Kingdom	Napoleonic Wars: The ship was captured by Vénus (French Navy) whilst on a voyage from Newfoundland, British North America to Poole, Dorset. She was set afire and sunk.
Nikolai	Russian-American Company	The schooner ran aground on the Olympic Peninsula in the Oregon Country on a beach north of the Quillayute River and James Island during a gale and was abandoned by her crew.

=== 15 November ===
List of shipwrecks: 15 November 1808
Ship	State	Description
Auckland	United Kingdom	The ship was wrecked in the Bay of Cádiz. All on board were rescued.
Barbara	United Kingdom	The sloop foundered in the North Sea. Her crew were rescued. She was on a voyage from Montrose, Forfarshire, to Newcastle upon Tyne, Northumberland.
Brothers	United Kingdom	The ship was driven ashore and damaged at Penzance, Cornwall. She was on a voyage from Neath, Glamorgan, to Plymouth, Devon. She was later refloated and put into Newlyn, Cornwall in a waterlogged condition.
Courier	United Kingdom	The ship sprang a leak and subsequently drove onto the Stoney Binns, in the Humber. Her crew were rescued.
Favourite	United Kingdom	Napoleonic Wars: The ship was captured off Ouessant, Finistère, France, whilst on a voyage from Gijón, Spain, to London. She was subsequently lost near Cherbourg, Seine-Inférieure, France.
Unnamed	United Kingdom	The brig ran aground on the Trinity Sand, in the Humber, and sank. Her crew were rescued.

=== 16 November ===
List of shipwrecks: 16 November 1808
Ship	State	Description
Apollo	United Kingdom	The transport ship was driven ashore at Millbay, Plymouth, Devon.
Elizabeth	United Kingdom	The transport ship was wrecked on the south coast of the Isle of Wight with the loss of eleven of her twenty crew.
Nemisis	Portugal	The ship was in collision with Allegria Constant (Portugal) at Falmouth, Cornwall, United Kingdom, and was subsequently driven ashore and wrecked.
Peggy	United Kingdom	The ship was lost near Whitehaven, Cumberland. She was on a voyage from Dublin to Newry, County Antrim and Harrington, Cumberland.
Pomona	United Kingdom	The ship was wrecked near Banff, Aberdeenshire. She was on a voyage from Liverpool, Lancashire, to Leith, Lothian.
Recovery	United Kingdom	The ship was driven ashore and wrecked at Great Yarmouth, Norfolk. She was on a voyage from Plymouth to Gothenburg, Sweden.
Rosina	United Kingdom	The ship was driven ashore at Whitstable, Kent. She was refloated on 21 November.

=== 17 November ===
List of shipwrecks: 17 November 1808
Ship	State	Description
Ariel	United Kingdom	The ship was wrecked on Rathlin Island, County Donegal. Her crew were rescued. She was on a voyage from Nova Scotia, British North America, to Hull, Yorkshire.
Duncomber	United Kingdom	The ship was driven ashore at Quebec, British North America.
Friendship	United Kingdom	Napoleonic Wars: The transport ship was captured by three French privateers off Boulogne, Pas-de-Calais, France, and was destroyed.
Jane	United Kingdom	The ship was driven ashore at Kamouraska, Quebec, British North America.
Lady Borrington	United Kingdom	The ship was lost at Quebec.
Margaret	United Kingdom	The ship was driven ashore at Kamouraska.
Neva	United Kingdom	The ship was wrecked at Kamouraska.
Samuels	United Kingdom	The ship was driven ashore at Quebec.
Zephyr	United Kingdom	The transport ship was severely damaged at Milford Haven, Pembrokeshire.

=== 18 November ===
List of shipwrecks: 18 November 1808
Ship	State	Description
Cruizer	United Kingdom	The ship was driven ashore at Ramsgate, Kent. She was on a voyage from London to Rio de Janeiro.
Enterprize	United Kingdom	The transport ship was driven ashore at Mawgan Porth, Cornwall.
Maria	United Kingdom	The ship was driven ashore at Hoylake, Lancashire. She was on a voyage from Liverpool, Lancashire to Exeter, Devon.
Neutrality	United Kingdom	The ship was driven ashore at Ramsgate, Kent. She was on a voyage from Málaga, Spain, to London.
Olive Branch	United Kingdom	The ship foundered in the Atlantic Ocean (50°05′N 31°15′W). Her crew were rescued by Margaret (United Kingdom). Olive Branch was on a voyage from Liverpool, Lancashire, to Newfoundland, British North America.
Triton	United Kingdom	The sloop was wrecked at Hoylake with the loss of a crew member.
Two Brothers	United Kingdom	The ship was driven ashore and severely damaged at Plymouth, Devon.

=== 19 November ===
List of shipwrecks: 19 November 1808
Ship	State	Description
Henry	United Kingdom	The ship departed from Cork for Portsmouth, Hampshire. No further trace, presumed foundered with the loss of all hands.
Providence	United Kingdom	The transport ship was wrecked at Bolt Head, Devon, with the loss of all but her captain.
Roebuck	United Kingdom	The ship was wrecked near Ilfracombe, Devon, with the loss of all but one of her crew.

=== 20 November ===
List of shipwrecks: 20 November 1808
Ship	State	Description
Integrity	United Kingdom	The transport ship was driven ashore and wrecked at Trevose Head, Cornwall. Her crew had been rescued by Speedwell (United Kingdom) before she came ashore.
Johns	United Kingdom	The ship was lost on Skagen, Denmark. Her crew were rescued. She was on a voyage from Leith, Lothian to Gothenburg, Sweden.
Mercury	United Kingdom	The brig ran aground off Dover, Kent. She was on a voyage from Lisbon, Portugal to Dover. She was refloated the next day and taken in to Dover.

=== 21 November ===
List of shipwrecks: 21 November 1808
Ship	State	Description
Elizabeth	United Kingdom	The ship was driven ashore and wrecked at Trevose Head, Cornwall, with the loss of two of her crew. She was on a voyage from Waterford to Shoreham-by-Sea, Sussex.
Integrity	United Kingdom	The transport ship was wrecked near Padstow, Cornwall. Her crew were rescued.
Lord Nelson	British East India Company	The East Indiaman was last seen at 8°30′S 80°00′E. No further trace, presumed foundered with the loss of all hands. She was on a voyage from Madras, India, to London.
Lovely Dorcas	United Kingdom	The ship was driven ashore and wrecked in the River Shannon. She was on a voyage from St. Ubes, Portugal, to Limerick.
Selina	United Kingdom	The transport ship was driven ashore in Bigbury Bay, Devon. She was on a voyage from Cork to Portsmouth, Hampshire
Speedy	United Kingdom	The ship was driven ashore and wrecked at Trevose Head with the loss of all hands. She was on a voyage from Malta to London.

=== 22 November ===
List of shipwrecks: 22 November 1808
Ship	State	Description
Barbara	United Kingdom	The sloop foundered in the North Sea. Her crew were rescued. She was on a voyage from Montrose, Forfarshire, to Newcastle-upon-Tyne, Northumberland.
Olive Branch	United Kingdom	The ship foundered in the Atlantic Ocean (50°05′N 51°15′W) whilst on a voyage from Liverpool, Lancashire, to Newfoundland, British North America. Her crew had been rescued by Margaret (United Kingdom) on 18 November.

=== 25 November ===
List of shipwrecks: 25 November 1808
Ship	State	Description
Polly	United Kingdom	The ship sailed from Malta on this date. No further trace, presumed foundered with the loss of all hands.

=== 26 November ===
List of shipwrecks: 26 November 1808
Ship	State	Description
Britannia	United Kingdom	The ship was driven ashore and wrecked between Port Antonia and Port Maria, Jamaica.
Goede Verwagting	(Netherlands) Kingdom of Holland	The galiot was captured by an English privateer. She subsequently foundered on the Brown Bank, in the North Sea. Her crew were rescued by a Dutch fishing vessel.
John	United Kingdom	The ship struck a rock off Heligoland and was abandoned by her crew. She was on a voyage from the Clyde to Heligoland.

=== 28 November ===
List of shipwrecks: 28 November 1808
Ship	State	Description
Atlas	United Kingdom	The collier was driven ashore near Brighton, Sussex. She was later refloated and taken in to Newhaven, Sussex.
Dee Vigilante	(Netherlands) Kingdom of Holland	The ship ran aground near Dordrecht, South Holland.
Delight	United Kingdom	The collier was driven ashore near Brighton.
Harlequin	United Kingdom	The ship was sunk at Madeira, Portugal, by cannon fire from a land-based fort. She was on a voyage from London to Berbice.
Hercules	United Kingdom	The collier was driven ashore near Brighton. She was later refloated and taken in to Newhaven.
John and Jane	United Kingdom	The collier was driven ashore near Brighton.
Maria Charlotta	Sweden	The ship foundered in the North Sea off Great Yarmouth, Norfolk. Her crew were rescued. She was subsequently beached at Southwold, Suffolk, United Kingdom. Maria Charlotta was on a voyage from Gothenburg to Gibraltar.
Mary	United Kingdom	The collier was driven ashore near Brighton.
Summer	United Kingdom	The ship was driven ashore in the Isles of Scilly. She was on a voyage from Lisbon, Portugal, to Plymouth, Devon.

=== 29 November ===
List of shipwrecks: 29 November 1808
Ship	State	Description
Spero	United Kingdom	The schooner was wrecked at the mouth of the River Don. Her crew were rescued.

=== 30 November ===
List of shipwrecks: 30 November 1808
Ship	State	Description
John and Thomas	United Kingdom	The sloop struck the quay at Whitehaven, Cumberland, and sank with the loss of all hands, which numbered at least four.
Nelly & Ann	United Kingdom	The ship departed from Plymouth, Devon, for London. No further trace, presumed foundered with the loss of all hands.
Phœnix	United Kingdom	The sloop was wrecked near Pittenweem, Forfarshire, with the loss of four of her six crew. She was on a voyage from Sunderland, County Durham, to Aberdeen.

=== Unknown date ===
List of shipwrecks: Unknown date in November 1808
Ship	State	Description
Admiral Dacres	(United Kingdom of Great Britain and Ireland) Jamaica	Napoleonic Wars: The ship was driven ashore by French privateers.
Alert	United Kingdom	The ship foundered at the mouth of the River Thames. She was on a voyage from South Shields, County Durham, to London.
Amphitrite	United Kingdom	After being refloated at Pictou, Nova Scotia, British North America, on 6 November, the ship later was driven ashore at Bedec, New Brunswick, British North America.
Annan	United Kingdom	The ship departed from Newfoundland, British North America for Waterford. No further trace, presumed foundered with the loss of all hands.
Doris	United Kingdom	The ship was driven ashore in Red Wharf Bay, Anglesey. She was on a voyage from London to Liverpool, Lancashire.
Duncombe	United Kingdom	The ship was driven ashore in the Saint Lawrence River. She was later refloated.
Experiment	British East India Company	The East Indiaman foundered with the loss of all hands while returning to England from Bengal.
Freden	Sweden	The ship foundered off Møn, Denmark. She was on a voyage from Westerwick, Shetland Islands, United Kingdom, to Gothenburg.
Gardiner and Joseph	United Kingdom	The ship was driven ashore in the Saint Lawrence River. She was on a voyage from Quebec City to London.
Glory	United Kingdom	The East Indiaman foundered with the loss of all hands while returning to England from Bengal.
Grindet	(United Kingdom of Great Britain and Ireland) Jamaica	Napoleonic Wars: The ship was driven ashore by French privateers.
Henry	United Kingdom	The ship foundered in the Atlantic Ocean (47°07′N 8°28′W). Her crew were rescued by Summer (United Kingdom). Henry was on a voyage from Bristol, Gloucestershire, to Seville, Spain.
Hoppet	United Kingdom	Gunboat War: The ship was captured and burnt by the Danes. She was on a voyage from Stockholm, Sweden, to London.
James	United Kingdom	The ship was driven ashore at Cross Haven, County Cork. She was on a voyage from St. Ubes, Portugal, to Limerick.
Jane	United Kingdom	The ship was driven ashore in the Saint Lawrence River.
Laura	United Kingdom	The ship sank at Great Yarmouth, Norfolk. Her crew were rescued.
Margaretta	Sweden	The ship was driven ashore on the coast of Norway. Her crew were rescued but taken prisoner. She was on a voyage from Gothenburg to a Spanish port.
Maria	United Kingdom	The transport ship was driven ashore at Newhaven, Sussex.
Mars	United Kingdom	The transport ship was driven ashore and wrecked on the Île de Ré, Charente-Maritime, France. Her crew were rescued.
Mary and Margaret	United Kingdom	The ship was wrecked near Pembroke with the loss of all hands. She was on a voyage from Lisbon, Portugal, to Ayr.
Ruby	United Kingdom	The sloop was wrecke at Craigarrock with the loss of all hands. She was on a voyage from Glasgow, Renfrewshire to Bristol, Gloucestershire.
Susannah	United Kingdom	The ship was driven ashore in the Saint Lawrence River.
Trusty	United Kingdom	The ship was wrecked near Bideford, Devon, with the loss of all hands. She was on a voyage from Newfoundland to Bristol, Gloucestershire.
Union	United Kingdom	The ship was wrecked on "Wargorne Island". She was on a voyage from Rochester, Kent, to Gothenburg.
Vincedor	United Kingdom	The ship ship ran aground on the Gunfleet Sand, in the North Sea off the coast of Essex. She was on a voyage from London to the Brazils. She was refloated with the assistance of a pilot boat and taken in to Harwich, Essex.
Vrow Catharina	Heligoland	The ship departed from Gravesend, Kent, for Heligoland. No further trace, presumed foundered in the North Sea with the loss of all hands.
Unnamed	United Kingdom	The brig was wrecked at Merigomish, Nova Scotia, British North America on or about 9 November. She was on a voyage from Poole, Dorset to Prince Edward Island, British North America.

== December ==
=== 1 December ===
List of shipwrecks: 1 December 1808
Ship	State	Description
Euphrates	United Kingdom	The brig was wrecked at São Miguel Island, Azores.
Waterman	United Kingdom	The ship was last sighted on this date. She was on a voyage from the Nore to Gothenburg, Sweden. Presumed foundered with the loss of all hands.

=== 3 December ===
List of shipwrecks: 3 December 1808
Ship	State	Description
Friends Goodwill	United Kingdom	The ship was lost near Land's End, Cornwall. She was on a voyage from Swansea, Glamorgan, to St. Mawes, Cornwall.
Lydia	United Kingdom	War of the Fourth Coalition: The ship was captured by Amphitrite (French Navy) and was scuttled. She was on a voyage from Liverpool, Lancashire to Saint Kitts.
Vrouw Catherina	Heligoland	The ship departed from London for Heligoland. No further trace, presumed foundered in the North Sea with the loss of all hands.

=== 4 December ===
List of shipwrecks: 4 December 1808
Ship	State	Description
Charlotte	United Kingdom	The ship departed from Dublin for Plymouth, Devon. No further trace, presumed foundered with the loss of all hands.
Mary Hellen Elizabeth	United Kingdom	The ship was wrecked at São Miguel Island, Azores.
Wilhelmina	Sweden	The galiot was driven ashore and wrecked at Cairnbulg, Aberdeenshire, United Kingdom. Her eleven crew were rescued. She was on a voyage from Gothenburg to Liverpool, Lancashire, United Kingdom.

=== 5 December ===
List of shipwrecks: 5 December 1808
Ship	State	Description
HMS Crescent	Royal Navy	The fifth-rate was wrecked on the coast of Jutland with the loss of over 200 lives. There were about 40 survivors.
Fanny	United Kingdom	The ship was lost near Milford, Pembrokeshire. Her crew were rescued.
John	United Kingdom	The ship was wrecked at Ystad, Sweden. She was on a voyage from Loviisa, Sweden, to London.
Joseph and Mary	United Kingdom	The ship foundered in the North Sea off Flamborough Head, Yorkshire. Her crew were rescued.
Polly	United Kingdom	The ship struck a rock and sank whilst on a voyage from Limerick to the Clyde.
HMS Proselyte	Royal Navy	The bomb was crushed by ice in the Baltic Sea 8 nautical miles (15 km; 9.2 mi) off Anholt, Denmark, and was abandoned.
Victim	Spain	The schooner, which had been captured the previous day by Vénus (French Navy), foundered. She was on a voyage from Havana, Cuba, to Cádiz.

=== 6 December ===
List of shipwrecks: 6 December 1808
Ship	State	Description
Friends	United Kingdom	The ship was driven ashore in Minehead Bay and sank. She was on a voyage from St. Ives, Cornwall, to Bristol, Gloucestershire.
Johanna Margaretta	Sweden	The ship was sighted in the Dogger Bank whilst on a voyage from Stockholm to Brazil. No further trace, presumed foundered with the loss of all hands.
Pomona	United Kingdom	The ship departed from Seville, Spain, for London. No further trace, presumed foundered with the loss of all hands.

=== 7 December ===
List of shipwrecks: 7 December 1808
Ship	State	Description
Anna Maria	United Kingdom	The ship was driven ashore on the "Great Island", near Heligoland.
Anna Margaretta	Heligoland	The ship was wrecked at Heligoland with the loss of all hands.
Bertius	United Kingdom	The ship was driven ashore on the coast of Denmark.
Eliza	United Kingdom	The ship was driven ashore and wrecked on Heligoland.
Elizabeth	United Kingdom	The ship was driven ashore and wrecked on Düne, Heligoland.
Enigheden	Heligoland	The ship was driven ashore on the coast of Denmark.
Freden	United Kingdom	The ship was driven ashore and wrecked on Heligoland.
George	United Kingdom	The ship foundered off Harbor Island, New Providence, New Jersey, United States.
Haabe	Heligoland	The ship was driven ashore on the "Great Island", Heligoland.
Haabet	Heligoland	The ship was driven ashore on the coast of Denmark.
Hope	United Kingdom	The ship was driven ashore and wrecked on Heligoland.
Jonge	Flag unknown	The ship was driven ashore and wrecked on Heligoland.
Jong-Jacob	Heligoland	The ship was wrecked on Düne with the loss of all hands.
Lively	United Kingdom	The ship was driven ashore and wrecked on Heligoland.
Minerva	United Kingdom	The ship was driven ashore and wrecked on Heligoland.
New Success	United Kingdom	The ship was driven ashore and wrecked on Heligoland.
New Versuck	Heligoland	The ship was driven ashore and wrecked on Heligoland.
New Vorwick	Heligoland	The ship was driven ashore and wrecked on Düne.
Norden Star	Heligoland	The ship was driven ashore on "Great Island", Heligoland.
Paulinea	Heligoland	The ship foundered in the North Sea off Heligoland with the loss of all hands.
Perseverance	United Kingdom	The ship was driven ashore on the coast of Denmark.
Providentia	United Kingdom	The ship was driven ashore on the "Great Island", Heligoland.
Richard	United Kingdom	The ship was driven ashore at Bangor, County Down. She was on a voyage from Jamaica to Belfast, County Antrim.
Roberts	United Kingdom	The ship was driven ashore and wrecked on Heligoland.
Sophia	United Kingdom	The ship was driven ashore and wrecked on Düne.
Swan	United Kingdom	The ship was driven ashore and wrecked on Düne.
Twee Gebroeders	Heligoland	Captain Vasser's ship was driven ashore and wrecked on Düne.
Twee Gebroeders	Heligoland	Captain Derecks's ship was driven ashore and wrecked on Düne.

=== 8 December ===
List of shipwrecks: 8 December 1808
Ship	State	Description
Betsey	(United Kingdom of Great Britain and Ireland) Guernsey	The ship was wrecked on the coast of East Friesland, Prussia. She was on a voyage from Gothenburg, Sweden, to Guernsey.
Charlotte	United Kingdom	The ship foundered with the loss of all but two of her crew. She was on a voyage from Dublin to Plymouth, Devon.
Experiment	United Kingdom	The ship struck the pier and sank at Dover, Kent. She was on a voyage from Portsmouth, Hampshire, to London
Richard	United Kingdom	The ship was wrecked on the Tusker Rock, in the Bristol Channel with the loss of four of her seven crew. She was on a voyage from Cardigan to the Ogmore River.

=== 10 December ===
List of shipwrecks: 10 December 1808
Ship	State	Description
HMS Jupiter	Royal Navy	The Portland-class frigate was wrecked in Vigo Bay. Her crew were rescued.
Molly	United Kingdom	The ship foundered in the Baltic Sea. Her crew were rescued.
Phœnix	United Kingdom	The ship departed from Dungarvan, County Waterford, for Portsmouth, Hampshire. No further trace, presumed foundered with the loss of all hands.
Unnamed	United Kingdom	The transport ship was lost in Vigo Bay Her crew were rescued.

=== 11 December ===
List of shipwrecks: 11 December 1808
Ship	State	Description
Active	United Kingdom	The ship departed from Madeira for London. No further trace, presumed foundered with the loss of all hands.
Pomona	United Kingdom	Napoleonic Wars: The ship was captured and destroyed by a French ship operating under a Letter of Marque. She was on a voyage from Lisbon, Portugal, to London.

=== 15 December ===
List of shipwrecks: 15 December 1808
Ship	State	Description
Ersahnung	Flag unknown	The ship ran aground on the Fairness Rock, off Margate, Kent, United Kingdom, and was severely damaged. She was refloated in January 1809 and taken in to Margate.
HMS Flying Fish	Royal Navy	The schooner was wrecked on the coast of Hispaniola. Her crew were rescued.

=== 17 December ===
List of shipwrecks: 17 December 1808
Ship	State	Description
Albion	United Kingdom	The ship was driven ashore at Great Yarmouth, Norfolk. Her crew were rescued.
Beaver	United Kingdom	The ship was driven ashore on the French coast and was taken possession of by the French. She was on a voyage from London to Madeira.
Chrononotonthologos	United Kingdom	The ship was driven ashore and wrecked at St. Ives, Cornwall. She was on a voyage from Guernsey, Channel Islands, to Dublin.
Clio	United Kingdom	The ship was driven ashore and wrecked at Holyhead, Anglesey. Her crew were rescued. She was on a voyage from "Harlington" to Dublin.
Peggy	United Kingdom	The ship was driven ashore and wrecked at Holyhead. Her crew were rescued. She was on a voyage from Whitehaven, Cumberland to Dublin.
Providence	United Kingdom	The ship foundered in the English Channel off Start Point, Devon. Her crew were rescued. She was on a voyage from Neath, Glamorgan, to Rye, Sussex.
Surprize	United Kingdom	The ship was driven ashore at Conwy, Denbighshire.
Walpole	British East India Company	The East Indiaman was driven ashore at Margate, Kent. All on board were rescued. She was on a voyage from Bengal to London.
William	Sweden	The brigantine was lost near Cape Wrath, Sutherland, United Kingdom. She was on a voyage from Gothenburg to Alicante, Spain.

=== 18 December ===
List of shipwrecks: 18 December 1808
Ship	State	Description
Berwick	United Kingdom	The ship was sighted whilst on a voyage from London to Barbados. No further trace, presumed foundered with the loss of all hands.
Brighton Packet	United Kingdom	The ship sprang a leak in the English Channel. Achilles rescued the crew, who abandoned their vessel, and took them into Torbay.(United Kingdom).
Commerce	United Kingdom	The ship was driven ashore at Lowestoft, Suffolk. Her crew were rescued. She was on a voyage from Ipswich, Suffolk, to Leeds, Yorkshire.
Francis	United Kingdom	The ship was wrecked at Kingsdown, Kent. She was on a voyage from Cardiff, Glamorgan, to London.
Friendship	United Kingdom	The ship foundered in the English Channel. Her crew were rescued. She was on a voyage from Fowey, Cornwall, to Portsmouth, Hampshire.
Lord Duncan	United Kingdom	The ship was lost near Gijón, Spain. She was on a voyage from London to Gijón.
Mary	United Kingdom	The ship sank near Beaumaris, Anglesey. She was on a voyage from Harrington, Cumberland, to Dundalk.
Weathell	United Kingdom	The ship was driven ashore at Kirkley, Suffolk. Her crew were rescued. She was on a voyage from London to Boston, Lincolnshire.

=== 19 December ===
List of shipwrecks: 19 December 1808
Ship	State	Description
Ann	United Kingdom	The ship foundered in the English Channel off Portland, Dorset. Her crew were rescued. She was on a voyage from Cardiff, Glamorgan, to London.
Catharina	United Kingdom	The ship was wrecked on the Stora Reef. She was on a voyage from Saint Thomas, Virgin Islands to Jacmel, Haiti.
Dash	(United Kingdom of Great Britain and Ireland) Jersey	Napoleonic Wars: The ship was captured by a French privateer. She was subsequently wrecked on the French coast. Her crew were rescued but made prisoners. Dash was on a voyage from Glasgow, Renfrewshire, to Jersey.
Neptune	United Kingdom	The ship was driven ashore and wrecked at Walberswick, Suffolk. Her crew were rescued. She was on a voyage from London to Whitby, Yorkshire.
Twee Oenstur	Sweden	The ship was wrecked on the Goodwin Sands, Kent, United Kingdom Her crew survived.

=== 20 December ===
List of shipwrecks: 20 December 1808
Ship	State	Description
Integrity	United Kingdom	The ship was driven ashore and wrecked between Birling Gap and Beachy Head, Sussex. Her crew were rescued. She was on a voyage from Rio de Janeiro to London.
Perseverance	United Kingdom	The ship foundered off Belize. Her crew were rescued. She was on a voyage from Jamaica to British Honduras.
Spanish Junta	United Kingdom	The ship was wrecked on the Stoney Points Reef, off Guazava Island, Cuba. She was on a voyage from London to Havana, Cuba.
Wilson	United Kingdom	The ship was wrecked on the east coast of the United States. She was on a voyage from Nevis to Boston, Massachusetts, United States.

=== 21 December ===
List of shipwrecks: 21 December 1808
Ship	State	Description
Dolphin	United Kingdom	The ship was driven ashore at Bridlington, Yorkshire.
Eleanor	United Kingdom	The brig foundered in the English Channel off Dover, Kent, with the loss of all hands. She was on a voyage from Cardiff, Glamorgan, to London.
Jane	United Kingdom	The brig was driven ashore and wrecked at Shakespeare Cliff, Dover, with the loss of all but her captain. She was on a voyage from Limerick to London.
Jenny	United Kingdom	The ship was driven ashore at Bridlingdon.
Neptune	United Kingdom	The ship was driven ashore at Southwold, Suffolk Her crew were rescued. She was on a voyage from London to Whitby, Yorkshire.
Sarah	United Kingdom	The ship was driven ashore at Southwold. Her crew were rescued. She was on a voyage from London to Newcastle-upon-Tyne, Northumberland.
Two Brothers	United Kingdom	The ship was driven ashore at Bridlington.
Twee Gesustur	Sweden	The full-rigged ship was wrecked on the Goodwin Sands, Kent. Her crew survived. She was o a voyage from Norden, Kingdom of Hanover to London.
Urania	United Kingdom	The ship was wrecked on the Hook Sand, in the English Channel off Poole, Dorset. She was on a voyage from Porto, Portugal, to Hull, Yorkshire.

=== 22 December ===
List of shipwrecks: 22 December 1808
Ship	State	Description
Eleanor	United Kingdom	The ship was wrecked near Dover, Kent, with the loss of all hands. She was on a voyage from Cardiff, Glamorgan, to London.
Inteprity	United Kingdom	The ship was lost near Beachy Head, Sussex. Her crew were rescued. She was on a voyage from Rio de Janeiro to London.
Jane	United Kingdom	The ship was wrecked near Dover with the loss of all but her captain. She was on a voyage from Limerick to London.
Mayflower	United Kingdom	The ship was driven ashore at Padstow, Cornwall. Her crew were rescued. She was on a voyage from Portsmouth, Hampshire, to Cardiff, Glamorgan Mayflower was later refloated and brought in to Padstow.

=== 23 December ===
List of shipwrecks: 23 December 1808
Ship	State	Description
HMS Fama	Royal Navy	The brig was wrecked on Bornholm, Denmark, with the loss of eight lives. Survivors were taken prisoner by the Danes.
Percy	United Kingdom	The ship was driven ashore at Benacre, Suffolk. Her crew were rescued. She was on a voyage from London to North Shields, County Durham.
HMS Sacorner	Royal Navy	The sloop-cutter was wrecked near Ystadt, Sweden. Her crew were rescued.
Twilight	United Kingdom	The ship was driven ashore at Walberswick, Suffolk. Her crew were rescued.

=== 25 December ===
List of shipwrecks: 25 December 1808
Ship	State	Description
Lord Nelson	United Kingdom	The transport ship was discovered off Dieppe, Seine-Inférieure, France by HMS Cherokee (Royal Navy) in a crewless and plundered condition. She was taken in to Portsmouth, Hampshire.
Pensamenta Felix	Portugal	The ship sailed from Pernambuco, Brazil, for Liverpool, Lancashire, United Kingdom. No further trace, presumed foundered with the loss of all hands.

=== 28 December ===
List of shipwrecks: 28 December 1808
Ship	State	Description
Hope	United Kingdom	The ship was driven ashore on the Isle of Wight. She was on a voyage from Limerick to London.

=== 29 December ===
List of shipwrecks: 29 December 1808
Ship	State	Description
Magdalena	Sweden	The ship was wrecked at the mouth of the River Tees. Her crew were rescued by the Redcar Lifeboat. She was on a voyage from St. Ubes, Portugal, to Gothenburg.

=== 31 December ===
List of shipwrecks: 31 December 1808
Ship	State	Description
Ocean	United Kingdom	The ship was driven ashore near Fraserburgh, Aberdeenshire. She was on a voyage from Stockholm, Sweden, to Newcastle upon Tyne, Northumberland. Ocean was refloated in January 1809 and taken in to Newcastle upon Tyne.

=== Unknown date ===
List of shipwrecks: Unknown date in December 1808
Ship	State	Description
Alexander	United Kingdom	The ship was driven ashore and wrecked near Blakeney, Norfolk.
Anna	Sweden	The ship was wrecked on the Long Sand, in the North Sea with some loss of life. She was on a voyage from Gothenburg to London, United Kingdom.
Apollo	United Kingdom	The ship ran aground on the Goodwin Sands, Kent. She was on a voyage from Heligoland to Great Yarmouth, Norfolk. She was refloated on 20 December and taken in to Dover, Kent.
Ayles	United Kingdom	The ship departed Ramsgate, Kent, for Liverpool, Lancashire, on or after 8 December. No further trace, presumed foundered with the loss of all hands.
Bona Speranza & Margaritta	(United Kingdom of Great Britain and Ireland) Malta	The ship was driven ashore near Gravesend, Kent. She was on a voyage from Malta to London.
Boreas	United Kingdom	The ship was driven ashore at Caister-on-Sea, Norfolk. Her crew were rescued.
Brilliant	United Kingdom	The ship was driven ashore at Hamoaze, Devon. She was on a voyage from Gosport, Hampshire, to Plymouth, Devon.
HMS Bustler	Royal Navy	The gun-brig was wrecked on the French coast. Her crew were rescued by HMS Nymphe (Royal Navy).
Caroline	United Kingdom	The ship was driven ashore and severely damaged at Milford Haven, Pembrokeshire. Her crew were rescued. She was on a voyage from Bristol, Gloucestershire, to Cork. Caroline was later refloated and taken in to port.
Caroline Frederica	(Netherlands) Kingdom of Holland	The galiot was wrecked near Riga, Russia. Her crew were rescued.
Cartharina Haak	Sweden	The ship was driven ashore near Ystad. She was on a voyage from Karlshamn to London.
Commerce	United Kingdom	The ship was driven ashore at Lowestoft, Suffolk.
Conception	Spain	The ship foundered whilst on a voyage from Málaga to A Coruña with the loss of all but her captain.
Cupid	United Kingdom	The ship sprang a leak and was beached at Whitby, Yorkshire. She was later refloated and taken in to Whitby.
Eliza	United Kingdom	The ship was wrecked on the Welsh coast. She was on a voyage from Guernsey, Channel Islands, to Bristol.
Eliza	United Kingdom	The ship was driven ashore at Great Yarmouth, Norfolk. She was on a voyage from London to Gothenburg, Sweden.
Eliza	United Kingdom	The ship was driven ashore at Hornsea, Yorkshire.
Fama	United Kingdom	The ship was wrecked on Saaremaa, Russia.
Favourite	United Kingdom	The ship was wrecked near Murray Harbour, Prince Edward Island, British North America. She was on a voyage from Prince Edward Island, British North America to Liverpool.
Felicidade	Portugal	The ship foundered whilst on a voyage from Maranhão, Brazil to Porto.
Forrester	United Kingdom	The ship was wrecked near "Kelsoy". Her crew were rescued.
Friends	United Kingdom	The ship departed from Heligoland for Gothenburg, Sweden. No further trace, presumed foundered with the loss of all hands.
Hannibal	United Kingdom	Napoleonic Wars: The ship was captured and sunk by La Colebre (French Navy). Hannibal was on a voyage from Newfoundland, British North America to London.
Harriet	United Kingdom	The ship was lost near Karlskrona, Sweden. She was on a voyage from Plymouth to Stockholm.
Hundrig	United Kingdom	The ship was driven ashore and wrecked at Specton, Yorkshire. Her crew were rescued.
James's	United Kingdom	The ship was driven ashore at Leith, Lothian.
Johan Adriana	Flag unknown	The ship foundered whilst on a voyage from London to a Baltic port. There were six survivors.
Junius	United Kingdom	The ship was driven ashore at Sunderland, County Durham.
Jupiter	United Kingdom	The ship was wrecked on the coast of Norway. She was on a voyage from Great Yarmouth to Gothenburg, Sweden.
Lady Borrington	United Kingdom	The ship was lost at Quebec City, Lower Canada, British North America.
Love and Unity	United Kingdom	The ship was wrecked on the Rudland Sands, in the Irish Sea off the coast of Flintshire. She was on a voyage from Poole, Dorset, to Liverpool.
Margaritta	(United Kingdom of Great Britain and Ireland) Malta	The ship was driven ashore near Gravesend. She was on a voyage from Malta to London.
Maria	Sweden	The schooner was driven ashore on the Dutch coast with some loss of life. She was on a voyage from Kalmar to London. Maria later floated off and was found at sea by HMS Mariner (Royal Navy). She was towed in to Dover, Kent.
Maria	United Kingdom	The ship was driven ashore and wrecked near Frederikshamn. Her crew were rescued.
Mayflower	United Kingdom	The ship was driven ashore and wrecked in the River Shannon. She was on a voyage from Limerick to A Coruña, Spain
Myrmidon	United Kingdom	The ship was driven ashore and wrecked near Blakeney.
Nadezhda	Russia	The ship foundered off Malmö, Sweden.
Nancy	United Kingdom	The ship was driven ashore at Great Yarmouth.
Neptune	Sweden	The brig was wrecked on Benbecula, United Kingdom. Her crew were rescued. She was on a voyage from Liverpool, Lancashire, United Kingdom, to Stockholm.
Neptune	United Kingdom	The ship was driven ashore and wrecked in the Orkney Islands. Her crew were rescued. She was on a voyage from Liverpool to Stockholm, Sweden.
Neptune	United Kingdom	The ship was driven ashore on the coast of Lincolnshire.
Nerina	United Kingdom	The ship was driven ashore in the Orkney Islands. She was on a voyage from Quebec to London.
Nymph	United Kingdom	The ship was driven ashore at Hornsea.
Old Friends	United Kingdom	The ship was driven ashore at Falmouth, Cornwall. She was on a voyage from Plymouth, Devon, to Gibraltar.
Phœnix	United Kingdom	The ship was captured by Topaze (French Navy) whilst on a voyage from Liverpool to Brazil. She was set afire and sunk.
HMS Pincher	Royal Navy	The Archer-class gun-brig ran aground on the Goodwin Sands, Kent. She was refloated n and taken in to Dover.
Polly	United Kingdom	The ship foundered in the North Sea off Lindisfarne, Northumberland.
Priscilla	United Kingdom	Napoleonic Wars: The ship was captured and sunk by La Colebre (French Navy). Priscilla was on a voyage from Newfoundland to London.
Providence	United Kingdom	The ship was wrecked near Lisbon, Portugal. She was on a voyage from Gibraltar to Lisbon.
Ranger	United Kingdom	The ship was wrecked on the Goodwin Sands, Kent. Her crew were rescued. She was on a voyage from Gothenburg, Sweden, to Guernsey.
Rebecca	United Kingdom	The ship was driven ashore and wrecked near Malmö.
Reliance	United Kingdom	The ship was wrecked on the Home Sand, in the North Sea off Lowestoft.
Rose	United Kingdom	The ship foundered in the North Sea off Whitby, Yorkshire.
Rose in June	United Kingdom	The sloop was abandoned by her crew in the English Channel off Dungeness, Kent. She was later towed in to Ramsgate, Kent, by HMS Thrasher (Royal Navy). Rose in June was on a voyage from Cork to London.
Speculation	United Kingdom	The ship was wrecked at Karlskrona, Sweden. Her crew were rescued.
Tartar	United Kingdom	The ship was driven ashore in the River Mersey at Seacombe, Cheshire. She was later refloated.
Teutonia	Flag unknown	The ship was lost in the Baltic.
Triton	United Kingdom	The ship was run down and sunk by HMS Orion (Royal Navy) with the loss of about half of her crew.
Twey Broeders	Flag unknown	The ship was wrecked at Marstrand, Sweden.
Union	British East India Company	The ship was wrecked on the Long Sand, in the North Sea off Margate, Kent.
Wheatnell	United Kingdom	The ship was driven ashore at Kirkley, Suffolk. She was on a voyage from London to Boston, Lincolnshire.
Wilhelmina	Sweden	The ship foundered in the North Sea off Fraserburgh, Aberdeenshire, United Kingdom.
Woodman	United Kingdom	The ship was wrecked on the Suffolk coast. Her crew were rescued. She was on a voyage from Newhaven, Sussex, to Newcastle upon Tyne, Northumberland.

== Unknown date ==
List of shipwrecks: Unknown date in 1808
Ship	State	Description
Adventure	United Kingdom	The ship foundered whilst on a voyage from the Davis Straits to the United Kingdom. Her crew were rescued.
Alfred	United Kingdom	The ship was wrecked at Placentia, Newfoundland, British North America.
Argonaut	Flag unknown	The ship was wrecked on Glover's Reef. She was on a voyage from British Honduras to Jamaica.
Aurora	United Kingdom	The ship went ashore during a voyage from the United Kingdom to Greenland. She put into Kingston upon Hull in March after the incident and returned to service later in 1808
Avos	Russian Empire	During a voyage in Russian America from Kodiak to Sitka, the Russian-American Company tender was lost in "Bay of Islands," most likely a reference to Bay of Isles (60°24′N 147°37′W) on the coast of Knight Island in Prince William Sound.
Batavia	United Kingdom	The ship was wrecked at Bermuda. Her crew were rescued. She was on a voyage from Trinidad to Liverpool, Lancashire.
Bellisarius	United Kingdom	The ship was wrecked at Cape Cod, Massachusetts, United States. Her crew were rescued. She was on a voyage from Halifax, Nova Scotia, British North America], to New Brunswick, British North America and Liverpool.
Brothers	(United Kingdom of Great Britain and Ireland) British North America	The coaster was wrecked on the north coast of Newfoundland.
Byam	United Kingdom	Napoleonic Wars: The snow was captured, driven ashore on Guadeloupe, and burnt sometime prior to 12 April.
Charles William	United Kingdom	The ship was driven ashore on Anticosti Island, Lower Canada, British North America. She was on a voyage from Quebec City, Lower Canada, to London.
Consolation	French Navy	War of the Fourth Coalition: The corvette was sunk in a battle with HMS Foudroyant and HMS Marlborough (both Royal Navy) sometime between June and September.
Cygnet	United Kingdom	The ship was wrecked in the Cayman Islands. She was on a voyage from Jamaica to London.
Ephron	United Kingdom	The ship was lost in the Saint Lawrence River. She was on a voyage from Liverpool to Quebec City.
Flora	United Kingdom	The ship was destroyed by fire at New York, United States.
Forsicate	United Kingdom	The ship was wrecked 4 leagues (12 nautical miles (22 km)) from Valencia, Spain. She was on a voyage from Gibraltar to Valenica.
Frede	(Netherlands) Kingdom of Holland	The ship ran aground in the River Plate.
Frederica	Sweden	The ship departed from Gothenburg for Malmö at the end of August or beginning of September. No further trace, presumed foundered with the loss of all hands.
Hamilton	United Kingdom	The ship was driven ashore in the Saint Lawrence River. She was on a voyage from the Clyde to Quebec City.
Harp	United Kingdom	The ship was sunk by ice off the coast of Newfoundland, British North America.
Highlander	United Kingdom	The ship was lost at New Brunswick.
Industry	United Kingdom	The ship was lost at British Honduras. She was on a voyage from British Honduras to London.
Jannett	India	Napoleonic Wars: The ship was captured and sunk between 9 June and 9 October by Jena (French Navy).
Kate	United Kingdom	The ship was lost at Newfoundland.
Lively	United Kingdom	The ship was wrecked in early 1808, probably while sailing from whaling grounds in the vicinity of the Molucca Islands and Timor to the United Kingdom. A wreck discovered in the Indian Ocean at 16°20′S 119°35′E at Mermaid Reef in the Rowley Shoals is believed to be that of Lively.
Lord Duncan	United Kingdom	The ship was lost at Demerara. She was on a voyage from Demerara to Barbados.
Maria	United States	The brig was wrecked on the coast of Cuba. She was on a voyage from Cuba to New York.
Minerva	United Kingdom	The whaler was lost off the coast of Greenland. Her crew were rescued.
HMS Muros	Royal Navy	The frigate was wrecked at Havana, Cuba, whilst attacking a battery. Her crew were rescued.
Nettley	United Kingdom	The schooner capsized off Barbados in a squall. Nine of her crew survived.
Olive Branch	(United Kingdom of Great Britain and Ireland) British North America	The ship was wrecked in the Saint Lawrence River.
Select	United Kingdom	The ship was lost in the Saint Lawrence River. She was on a voyage from Quebec City to London.
Speedwell	United Kingdom	The ship was wrecked in the Saint Lawrence River. She was on a voyage from Madeira to Quebec City.
Surinam	United Kingdom	The ship was driven ashore and wrecked at Grenada. She was on a voyage from Surinam to Bristol, Gloucestershire.
Three Brothers	United Kingdom	The transport ship foundered in the Atlantic Ocean with the loss of 283 of the 303 people on board. Fifteen survivors were rescued by Alert (United Kingdom).
Three Brothers	United Kingdom	The ship was driven ashore on Goose Island, in the Saint Lawrence River. She was on a voyage from Quebec City to London. Three Brothers was refloated in February 1809.
Triton	United States	The ship foundered in the Atlantic Ocean off Savannah, Georgia. She was on a voyage from Amsterdam, North Holland, Kingdom of Holland to Baltimore, Maryland.
Union	United Kingdom	Napoleonic Wars: The ship was captured and burnt. She was on a voyage from Surinam to Halifax.
Watt	United Kingdom	The ship was driven ashore in the Saint Lawrence River. She was on a voyage from Liverpool to Quebec City. Watt was later refloated and taken in to Quebec City.
William	United States	Napoleonic Wars: The ship was captured and burnt by two French Navy frigates. She was on a voyage from Liverpool to Savannah, Georgia.
William	United Kingdom	Napoleonic Wars: The schooner was captured and burnt by Palinure (French Navy). She was on a voyage from Halifax to Montego Bay, Jamaica.
Young John	United Kingdom	The ship was driven ashore on Goose Island, in the Saint Lawrence River. She was on a voyage from Quebec City to Liverpool. She was subsequently declared a total loss.
