= HMS Volador =

Sloop of the Royal Navy

History

United Kingdom
- Name: HMS Volador
- Namesake: Previous name retained
- Acquired: 1807 by purchase of a prize
- Fate: Wrecked 23 October 1808

General characteristics
- Tons burthen: 273 (bm)
- Sail plan: Brig or Sloop-of-war
- Complement: 121
- Armament: 16 guns

HMS Volador was an ex-Spanish prize that the Royal Navy acquired in 1807 in the West Indies. Commander Francis George Dickens commissioned her.

Lloyd's List (LL) reported on 27 January 1809 that the "Brig of War" Volador, of 18 guns, and a Spanish schooner, had been lost on 24 October 1808 in the Gulf of Cora. One account describes Volador as a sloop-of-war, and reports that one man was lost in her sinking. Several other men may have deserted.

Volador had sailed from Curaçao, searching for a privateer reported to be operating near Maracaibo. At about 1 p.m. on 23 October 1808 she struck on a reef in the Coro Gulf. Attempts to lighten her failed, but her pumps kept her afloat despite the heavy surf, squalls of rain, and her beating on the rocks. On the morning of 24 October 1808 it became apparent that she was near Cape Areekala, and that a Spanish schooner was nearby, also aground, and breaking up. The British took to their boats, but also sent a boat to the schooner to rescue her crew. The boat overturned, drowning one man. Still, the British were able to rescue the Spaniards, who joined the British on the shore. A party from Volador went along the coast to Coro to get help. Four days later the packet Honduras (possibly Honduras Packet) arrived and took off the remaining survivors. The court martial of Darwin, his officers, and crew absolved them of blame, blaming instead grossly inaccurate charts.
