= List of ships named Honduras Packet =

In the late 18th and early 19th century several vessels were named Honduras Packet:

- Honduras Packet was a brig of 100 tons (bm) launched in 1768 at Newfoundland as Union and renamed circa 1784. Possibly due to missing volumes or missing pages in extant volumes, she is last listed in 1787. She is not listed in 1790.
- Honduras Packet, a brig of 179 tons (bm), was a prize captured in 1793 that was captured and recaptured in 1801. She was apparently captured for the last time in 1804 by the French.
- Honduras Packet (1800 ship), a brig of 142–160 tons (bm), was launched in Spain in 1798 under another name and was renamed when the British captured her in 1800. She was a merchantman that between 1804 and 1809 made two voyages seal hunting or whaling in the Southern Fishery. She was also the first vessel to transport Scottish emigrants to Honduras in 1822–23 under Gregor MacGregor's ill-conceived and ill-fated "Poyais scheme". She is last listed in 1828–30.
- Honduras Packet was a brig of two guns and 12 men that the American privateer Mary-Ann, of Charleston captured and sent into Charleston on 19 August 1812. Honduras Packet had been carrying a cargo of sugar, rum, and dry goods, from Jamaica to San Domingo.

Citations
