= Tartar (1806 ship) =

UK slave and merchant ship (1806–1815)

History

United Kingdom
- Name: Tartar
- Launched: 1802 or 1805, France or Spain
- Acquired: 1806
- Fate: Wrecked February 1815

General characteristics
- Tons burthen: 259 (bm)
- Complement: 1806:35; 1813:36
- Armament: 1806:8 × 6-pounder guns + 10 × 12-pounder guns; 1813:12 × 9-pounder guns; 1815:2 × 12-pounder carronades

Tartar was launched in France in 1802, or Spain in 1805, almost certainly under another name. In 1806 she sailed under the flag of the United Kingdom on a voyage as a slave ship in the triangular trade in enslaved people. On her return she started trading between Liverpool and Brazil and Africa. A French frigate captured her in 1813, but then released her. She was wrecked early in 1815.

== Career ==
Transporting enslaved people: Captain John Mitchell acquired a letter of marque on 7 July 1806. He sailed from Liverpool on 9 August. Between 1 January 1806 and 1 May 1807, 185 vessels cleared Liverpool outward bound in the slave trade. Thirty of these vessels made two voyages during this period. Of the 155 vessels, 114 were regular slave ships, having made two voyages during the period, or voyages before 1806.

Tartar acquired captives at the Congo River. She arrived at Charleston on 10 January 1807 with 240 captives. She sailed from Charleston on 25 May, and arrived at back at Liverpool on 9 July. She had left Liverpool with 40 crew members and she suffered one crew death on her voyage.

The Slave Trade Act 1807 ended British participation in the trans-Atlantic slave trade so Tartar had to seek a new role. Although Tartar had been sailing from England since 1806, she did not appear in Lloyd's Register (LR) until 1808. Missing volumes meant that she did not appear in the Register of Shipping (RS) until 1809. Because the registers represented plans for the upcoming year they were only as accurate as owners chose to keep them, and of course, plans changed. Furthermore, the registers followed different publishing schedules. Consequently, the registers did not always agree. Other differences also appeared. LR gave Tartar's origins as France in 1802; the RS gave it as Spain in 1805.

Year	Master	Owner	Trade	Source
1808	Mitchell	M'Vicker	Liverpool–Brazil	LR
1809	Mitchell	M'Vicker	Liverpool–Madeira	RS

On 23 November 1805 Tartar, Mitchell, master, arrived at Liverpool from Bahia. She had sailed from Bahia on 9 October. Lloyd's List reported on 20 December that Tartar, Mitchell, master, had grounded at Seacombe in the Mersey while on her way to the Braziles. She was freed without damage.

Year	Master	Owner	Trade	Source
1814	Mitchell; Johnson	M'Vicker	Liverpool–Brazil; Liverpool-Africa	LR
1815	J.Johnson; W.Pearce	W.Taylor	Liverpool–Africa	LR
1815	Wilson	M'Iver	Liverpool-Africa	RS

Captain William Wilson acquired a letter of marque on 18 December 1813.

As Tartar, Wilson, master, was sailing from Liverpool to Africa, on 31 January 1814 she fell prey to the French frigate Jahde. Jahde had already captured William & Margaret, of and from Londonderry, bound to Grenada, and a Portuguese schooner, both of which she burnt. Jahde plundered Tartar and then gave her up to the crews as a cartel. Tartar arrived at Fayal on 22 February. There the Chief Magistrate ordered that she be returned to her owners. Tartar arrived at Liverpool on 29 May.

Year	Master	Owner	Trade	Source
1815	Pearce	Cook & Co.	Liverpool–Bermuda	RS

== Fate ==
On 29 January 1815 Tartar, Pearce, master, sailed from Liverpool to Bermuda. A few days later she was totally lost at Castle Maine, Ireland.
