= Coro Gulf =

Gulf in Falcón State, Venezuela

Coro Gulf is located near Coro, a city in Falcón State of Venezuela. This gulf is located south of the Paraguaná Peninsula, one of the largest peninsulas in Venezuela by size.
