= List of ship launches in 1807 =

The list of ship launches in 1807 includes a chronological list of some ships launched in 1807.

Date	Ship	Class	Builder	Location	Country	Notes
5 January	Dowson	West Indiaman	Thomas Steemson	Paull	United Kingdom	For S. Barworth & Co.
8 January	Calypso	Gloire-class frigate	Antoine, Louis and Mathurin Crucy	Lorient	France	For French Navy.
10 January	Cephalus	Cruizer-class brig-sloop	Custance & Stone	Yarmouth	United Kingdom	For Royal Navy.
10 January	Clio	Cruizer-class brig-sloop	James Betts	Mistleythorn	United Kingdom	For Royal Navy.
10 January	Royalist	Cruizer-class brig-sloop	Thomas Hills	Sandwich	United Kingdom	For Royal Navy.
19 January	Tweed	Cormorant-class ship-sloop	Thomas Ireonger	Littlehampton	United Kingdom	For Royal Navy.
24 January	Valiant	Repulse-class ship of the line	Perry, Green & Wells	Blackwall	United Kingdom	For Royal Navy.
26 January	Porcupine	Banterer-class post ship	Thomas Owen	Topsham	United Kingdom	For Royal Navy.
27 January	Rosamond	Cormorant-class ship-sloop	Simon Temple	Jarrow	United Kingdom	For Royal Navy.
9 February	Freeling	Brig	Symons	Falmouth	United Kingdom	For private owner.
24 February	Banterer	Banterer-class post ship	Temple shipbuilders	South Shields	United Kingdom	For Royal Navy.
24 February	Nelson	West Indiaman	Hilhouse	Bristol	United Kingdom	For P. J. Miles & Co.
February	Le Revenant	Privateer		Saint-Malo	France	For Robert Surcouf.
23 March	Minstrel	Cormorant-class ship-sloop	Nicholas Bools & William Good	Bridport	United Kingdom	For Royal Navy.
23 March	Volage	Laurel-class post ship	Richard Chapman	Bideford	United Kingdom	For Royal Navy.
24 March	Salsette	Perseverance-class frigate		Bombay Dockyard	India	For British East India Company.
24 March	Pitt	Perseverance-class frigate			United Kingdom	For Royal Navy.
27 March	Promethus	Storeship		Southampton	United Kingdom	For Royal Navy.
8 April	Charlemagne	Téméraire-class ship of the line		Antwerp	France	For French Navy.
9 April	Commerce de Lyon	Téméraire-class ship of the line		Antwerp	France	For French Navy.
12 April	Nettuno	Illyrien-class brig		Venice	Kingdom of Italy	For French Navy.
18 April	Pauline	Hortense-class frigate		Toulon	France	For French Navy.
22 April	Papillon	Sylphe-class brig		Havre de Grâce	France	For French Navy.
22 April	Fawn	Cormorant-class ship-sloop	Thomas Owen	Topsham	United Kingdom	For Royal Navy.
23 April	Bulwark	Third rate	Nicholas Diddams	Portsmouth Dockyard	United Kingdom	For Royal Navy.
23 April	Horatio	Lively-class frigate	George Parsons	Bursledon	United Kingdom	For Royal Navy.
23 April	Hussar	Lively-class frigate	Balthazar Adams	Buckler's Hard	United Kingdom	For Royal Navy.
24 April	Queen Mab	Talbot-class sloop	Simon Temple	Jarrow	United Kingdom	For Royal Navy.
25 April	Comet	Thais-class fireship	William Taylor	Bideford	United Kingdom	For Royal Navy.
25 April	Coquette	Cormorant-class ship-sloop	Temple shipbuilders	South Shields	United Kingdom	For Royal Navy.
25 April	Garland	Laurel-class post ship	Richard Chapman	Bideford	United Kingdom	For Royal Navy.
1 May	Mainwaring	Schooner	Bayley	Ipswich	United Kingdom	For Hudson's Bay Company.
11 May	Gornostai	Scchyogol-class lugger	G. I. Koshkin	Kazan	Russia	For Imperial Russian Navy.
11 May	Scchyogol	Scchyogol-class lugger	G. I. Koshkin	Kazan	Russia	For Imperial Russian Navy.
11 May	Vulkan	Bomb vessel	G. I. Koshkin	Kazan	Russia	For Imperial Russian Navy.
17 May	Amazone	Gloire-class frigate	François-Toussaint Gréhan	Havre de Grâce	France	For French Navy.
23 May	Borey	Selafail-class ship of the line	A. M. Kurochkin	Arkhangelsk	Russia	For Imperial Russian Navy.
23 May	Derwent	Cruizer-class brig-sloop	Isaac Blackburn	Turnchapel	United Kingdom	For Royal Navy.
23 May	Elizabeth	Repulse-class ship of the line	Wells	Blackwall	United Kingdom	For Royal Navy.
23 May	Oryol	Selafail-class ship of the line	A. M. Kurochkin	Arkhangelsk	Russia	For Imperial Russian Navy.
23 May	Severnaia Zvezda	Selafail-class ship of the line	A. M. Kurochkin	Arkhangelsk	Russia	For Imperial Russian Navy.
26 May	Tonquin	Barque	Adam and Noah Brown	New York	United States	For Edmund Fanning.
May	Bream	Ballahoo-class schooner	Goodrich & Co.	Bermuda	(United Kingdom of Great Britain and Ireland) Bermuda	For Royal Navy.
May	Chub	Ballahoo-class schooner	Goodrich & Co.	Bermuda	(United Kingdom of Great Britain and Ireland) Bermuda	For Royal Navy.
May	Cuttle	Ballahoo-class schooner	Goodrich & Co.	Bermuda	(United Kingdom of Great Britain and Ireland) Bermuda	For Royal Navy.
May	Duke of Gloucester	Brig		Kingston Royal Naval Dockyard	(United Kingdom of Great Britain and Ireland) Upper Canada	For Royal Navy.
May	Mullett	Ballahoo-class schooner	Goodrich & Co	Bermuda	(United Kingdom of Great Britain and Ireland) Bermuda	For Royal Navy.
May	Porgey	Ballahoo-class schooner	Goodrich & Co.	Bermuda	(United Kingdom of Great Britain and Ireland) Bermuda	For Royal Navy.
May	Tang	Ballahoo-class schooner	Goodrich & Co.	Bermuda	(United Kingdom of Great Britain and Ireland) Bermuda	For Royal Navy.
1 June	Argus	Spechnyi-class frigate		Arkhangelsk	Russia	For Imperial Russian Navy.
1 June	Bystryi	Spechnyi-class frigate		Arkhangelsk	Russia	For Imperial Russian Navy.
2 June	Providence	Merchantman	Matthew Smith & Hugh Reid	Howrah	India	For private owner.
6 June	Allart	Brig	Ernst Wilhelm Stibolt	Copenhagen	Denmark-Norway	For Dano-Norwegian Navy.
6 June	William & Mary	Royal Yacht		Westminster	United Kingdom	For William IV.
7 June	Anversois	Téméraire-class ship of the line		Antwerp	France	For French Navy.
9 June	Unnamed	State barge	Searle	Westminster	United Kingdom	For Lord Mayor of London.
11 June	Kazan	Ariadna-class corvette		Kazan	Russia	For Imperial Russian Navy.
14 June	Bellona	Corvette	Andrea Salvini	Venice	Kingdom of Italy	For French Navy.
18 June	Seaton	Merchantman	John Foster	Selby	United Kingdom	For John Foster.
20 June	Duguesclin	Téméraire-class ship of the line		Antwerp	France	For French Navy.
21 June	César	Téméraire-class ship of the line		Antwerp	France	For French Navy.
22 June	Marlborough	Fame-class ship of the line	Barnard	Deptford	United Kingdom	For Royal Navy.
June	Friedland	Friedland-class corvette	Coccon	Venice	Kingdom of Italy	For Royal Italian Navy.
6 July	Barracouta	Cruizer-class brig-sloop	Jabez Bayley	Ipswich	United Kingdom	For Royal Navy.
6 July	Milan	Brig	Entreprise Étheart	Saint-Malo	France	For French Navy.
7 July	Statira	Lively-class frigate	Robert Guillaume	Northam	United Kingdom	For Royal Navy.
7 July	York	Fame-class ship of the line	Daniel & Samuel Brent	Rotherhithe	United Kingdom	For Royal Navy.
20 July	Smeaton	Merchantman	Morton & Burn	Leith	United Kingdom	For private owner.
22 July	Talbot	Cormorant-class ship-sloop	James Heath & Sons	Teignmouth	United Kingdom	For Royal Navy.
23 July	Mariner	Merchantman	Fishburn & Brodrick	Whitby	United Kingdom	For private owner.
30 July	Anapa	Anapa-class ship of the line	M. K. Surotsov	Kherson	Russia	For Imperial Russian Navy.
July	Leda	Merchantman		Whitby	United Kingdom	For private owner.
July	Lord Mulgrave	Merchantman		Whitby	United Kingdom	For private owner.
July	Mariner	Merchantman		Whitby	United Kingdom	For private owner.
4 August	Eclipse	Cruizer-class brig-sloop	Thomas King	Dover	United Kingdom	For Royal Navy.
5 August	Nautilus	Cruizer-class brig-sloop	James Betts	Mistley	United Kingdom	For Royal Navy.
5 August	Primrose	Cruizer-class brig-sloop	Thomas Nickells	Fowey	United Kingdom	For Royal Navy.
6 August	Pilot	Cruizer-class brig-sloop	Robert Guillaume	Northam	United Kingdom	For Royal Navy.
6 August	The Mercury	Schooner	James Higgin	Ulverston	United Kingdom	For Josiah Ritchie.
15 August	Dantzig	Téméraire-class ship of the line		Antwerp	France	For French Navy.
18 August	Danae	Consolante-class frigate		Genoa	Kingdom of Sardinia	For French Navy.
19 August	Cumberland	Repulse-class ship of the line	Pitcher	Northfleet	United Kingdom	For Royal Navy.
20 August	Erebus	Thais-class fireship	Thomas Owen	Topsham	United Kingdom	For Royal Navy.
20 August	Sparrowhawk	Cruizer-class brig-sloop	Mathew Warren	Brightlingsea	United Kingdom	For Royal Navy.
2 September	D'Hautpoul	Téméraire-class ship of the line	Frères Crucy	Lorient	France	For French Navy.
3 September	Lord Cranstoun	Merchantman	Brocklebank	Lancaster	United Kingdom	For Williams, Wilson & Co.
3 September	Phœnix	West Indiaman		Chester	United Kingdom	For private owner.
4 September	Leonidas	Leda-class frigate	John Pelham	Frindsbury	United Kingdom	For Royal Navy.
5 September	Ranger	Sloop-of-war	Richard Thorne	Fremington	United Kingdom	For Royal Navy.
6 September	Ville de Berlin	Téméraire-class ship of the line		Antwerp	France	For French Navy.
18 September	Argo	West Indiaman	C. Smales & Co., or Eskdale, Cato & Co.	Whitby	United Kingdom	For R. Dale.
19 September	Sultan	Fame-class ship of the line	Dudman	Deptford	United Kingdom	For Royal Navy.
19 September	Name unknown	Barge	Searles & Co.	Lambeth	United Kingdom	For Worshipful Company of Drapers.
20 September	Pultusk	Téméraire-class ship of the line		Antwerp	France	For French Navy.
24 September	Admiral Gambier	Merchantman	Simon Temple	South Shields	United Kingdom	For Buckle & Co.
30 September	Lavrentii	Brig	M. K. Surotsov	Kherson	Russia	For Imperial Russian Navy.
1 October	Caledonia	West Indiaman	Carson, Forbes, Courtey & Co.	Chester	United Kingdom	For Mr. M'Inroy.
2 October	Myrtle	Cormorant-class ship-sloop	Richard Chapman	Bideford	United Kingdom	For Royal Navy.
3 October	Carnation	Cruizer-class brig-sloop	James Taylor	Bideford	United Kingdom	For Royal Navy.
3 October	North River	Paddle steamer	Charles Browne	New York	United States	For Robert Fulton and Robert R. Livingston.
7 October	Zenobia	Cruizer-class brig-sloop	Brindley	King's Lynn	United Kingdom	For Royal Navy.
9 October	Concord	Merchantman	Avery	Dartmouth	United Kingdom	For Mr. Haniford.
17 October	Undaunted	Lively-class frigate	Edward Sison	Woolwich Dockyard	United Kingdom	For Royal Navy.
19 October	Magnet	Cruizer-class brig-sloop	Robert Guillaume	Northm	United Kingdom	For Royal Navy.
30 October	Acorn	Cormorant-class ship-sloop	George Crocker	Bideford	United Kingdom	For Royal Navy.
30 October	Serpent	Curieux-class brig	Louis & Michel-Louis Crucy	Paimbœuf	France	For French Navy.
31 October	Egeria	Cormorant-class ship-sloop	Nicholas Bools & William Good	Bridport	United Kingdom	For Royal Navy.
October	Entreprenant	Patamar	Grisard	Île de France	(France) Mauritius	For French Navy.
3 November	Hyperion	Fifth rate	William Gibson	Hull	United Kingdom	For Royal Navy.
16 November	Boyne	Merchantman	Matthew Smith	Calcutta	India	For private owner.
16 November	Warspite	Third rate	Robert Seppings	Chatham Dockyard	United Kingdom	For Royal Navy.
18 November	Aboukir	Courageux-class ship of the line	Brindley	Frindsbury	United Kingdom	For Royal Navy.
18 November	Cato	West Indiaman	Westerdell & Barnes	Hull	United Kingdom	For Mr. Staniforth.
19 November	Frances Anne	Lifeboat	Lukin	Lowestoft	United Kingdom	For private owner.
27 November	Harmony	Brig		Lancaster	United Kingdom	For private owner.
27 November	Proserpine	Amphion-class frigate	Thomas Steemson	Paull	United Kingdom	For Royal Navy.
2 December	Pylade	Brig		Venice	Kingdom of Italy	For Royal Italian Navy.
2 December	Fiamma	corvette	Andrea Salvini	Venice	Kingdom of Italy	For French Navy.
27 December	Corona	Fifth rate		Venice	Kingdom of Italy	For Royal Italian Navy.
29 December	Plumper	Archer-class gun-brig	William Hughes	Halifax	(United Kingdom of Great Britain and Ireland) Upper Canada	For Royal Navy.
Spring	Clermont	Paddle steamer	Robert Fulton	Hudson River	United States	For Robert Fulton.
Unknown date	Admiral Decres	Privateer			France	For private owner.
Unknown date	Adolphe	Privateer			France	For Robert Surcouf.
Unknown date	Alert	Schooner		Sunderland	United Kingdom	For private owner.
Unknown date	Alexis	Merchantman	John & Philip Laing	Sunderland	United Kingdom	For private owner.
Unknown date	Amboyna	Brig		Rangoon	(United Kingdom of Great Britain and Ireland) Burma	For private owner.
Unknown date	Argyle	Slave ship		Liverpool	United Kingdom	For James Parr.
Unknown date	Aris	Brig		Venice	Kingdom of Italy	For Anastasios Tsamados.
Unknown date	Benares	Brig		Bombay	India	For British East India Company.
Unknown date	Brilliant	West Indiaman		Whitehaven	United Kingdom	For Hyde & Co.
Unknown date	Caledonia	Brig	Amherstburg Royal Naval Dockyard	Malden	(United Kingdom of Great Britain and Ireland) Upper Canada	For Royal Navy.
Unknown date	Ceneus	Brig	W. Potts	Sunderland	United Kingdom	For private owner.
Unknown date	Clarendon	West Indiaman		Whitehaven	United Kingdom	For Still & Co.
Unknown date	Daphne	Full-rigged ship			United Kingdom	For Royal Dutch Navy.
Unknown date	Defiance	Smack	Nicholas Bools & William Good	Bridport	United Kingdom	For William Good.
Unknown date	Experiment	Horse-powered ferry boat	David Wilkinson		United States	For private owner.
Unknown date	Fife Packet	Smack	Nicholas Bools & William Good	Bridport	United Kingdom	For William Good.
Unknown date	Fowey	Sloop	Nicholas Bools & William Good	Bridport	United Kingdom	For George Miller.
Unknown date	Frederick	Merchantman		Batavia	(Netherlands) Dutch East Indies	For Palmer & Co.
Unknown date	General Hunter	Brig		Amherstburg Royal Naval Dockyard	(United Kingdom of Great Britain and Ireland) Upper Canada	For Provincial Marine.
Unknown date	Havik	Full-rigged ship		Rotterdam	(Netherlands) Kingdom of Holland	For Royal Dutch Navy.
Unknown date	Hyena	Full-rigged ship		Dunkirk	France	For Royal Dutch Navy.
Unknown date	James Madison	Cutter		Baltimore, Maryland	United States	For United States Revenue-Marine.
Unknown date	Jean Bart	Privateer		Marseille	France	For Daumas Frères.
Unknown date	John Palmer	Merchantman		Plymouth	United Kingdom	For private owner.
Unknown date	Kastor	Kastor-class frigate	G. S. Islakov	Lodeynoye Pole	Russia	For Imperial Russian Navy.
Unknown date	Lascelles	Merchantman		Hull	United Kingdom	For private owner.
Unknown date	Leda	Merchantman	Holt & Richardson	Whitby	United Kingdom	For private owner.
Unknown date	Le Marsouin	Privateer			France	For Robert Surcouf.
Unknown date	Lord Cathcart	West Indiaman		Hull	United Kingdom	For private owner.
Unknown date	Lord Cathcart	Merchantman	Temple shipbuilders	South Shields	United Kingdom	For private owner.
Unknown date	Lord Cranstown	Merchantman	John Brockbank	Lancaster	United Kingdom	For private owner.
Unknown date	Lord Melville	Merchantman		Quebec	(United Kingdom of Great Britain and Ireland) Upper Canada	For private owner.
Unknown date	Mary Ann	Merchantman		Liverpool	United Kingdom	For Fisher & Co.
Unknown date	Mukaddeme i Hayir	Third rate		Sinop	Ottoman Empire	For Ottoman Navy.
Unknown date	Nonpareil	Privateer	William Price	Baltimore, Maryland	United States	For private owner.
Unknown date	Nouvelle Enterprise	Privateer		Livorno	France	For private owner.
Unknown date	Ortensia	Psiche-class schooner	Luigi Paresi	Venice	Kingdom of Italy	For French Navy.
Unknown date	Penrhyn Castle	Snow		Bangor	United Kingdom	For O. Griffith & Co.
Unknown date	Perthshire	Smack	Nicholas Bools & William Good	Bridport	United Kingdom	For William Good.
Unknown date	Poluks	Kastor-class frigate	G. S. Isakov	Lodeynoye Pole	Russia	For Imperial Russian Navy.
Unknown date	Portsea	Merchantman	Michael Smith	Howrah	India	For private owner.
Unknown date	Queen Charlotte	Packet boat		Falmouth	United Kingdom	For private owner.
Unknown date	Revenant	Privateer		Saint-Malo	France	For Jacques Récamier and others.
Unknown date	Rosina	Merchantman			Denmark-Norway	For private owner.
Unknown date	Rossie	Schooner	Thomas Kemp	Baltimore, Maryland	United States	For John McKim Jr.
Unknown date	Salisbury	Merchantman		Howdon	United Kingdom	For Mr Dodds.
Unknown date	Scipio	Merchantman	John & Philip Laing	Sunderland	United Kingdom	ForJ. Bonner.
Unknown date	Thames	West Indiaman		Howden	United Kingdom	For private owner.
Unknown date	Two Lydias	Privateer			(Netherlands) Kingdom of Holland	For private owner.
Unknown date	Tyne	West Indiaman	Daniel & Samuel Brent	Rotherhithe	United Kingdom	For John Locke.
Unknown date	Union	Schooner	Nicholas Bools & William Good	Bridport	United Kingdom	For Dundee Shipping Co.
Unknown date	Venus	Snow		Île de France	(France) Mauritius	For private owner.
Unknown date	Venus	Sixth rate		Dunkirk	France	For Royal Dutch Navy.
Unknown date	Waterhouse	Snow	W. Reay	Hylton	United Kingdom	For W. Taylor.
Unknown date	Name unknown	Merchantman			France	For private owner.
Unknown date	Name unknown	Merchantman			France	For private owner.
Unknown date	Name unknown	Merchantman			France	For private owner.
Unknown date	Name unknown	Slave ship			Spain	For private owner.
Unknown date	Name unknown	Schooner		Marblehead, Massachusetts	United States	For private owner.
Unknown date	Name unknown	Merchantman			France	For private owner.
Unknown date	Name unknown	Merchantman			Denmark-Norway	For private owner.
Unknown date	Name unknown	Merchantman			France	For private owner.
Unknown date	Name unknown	West Indiaman		New York	United States	For private owner.
