= HMS Phaeton (1782) =

Frigate of the Royal Navy

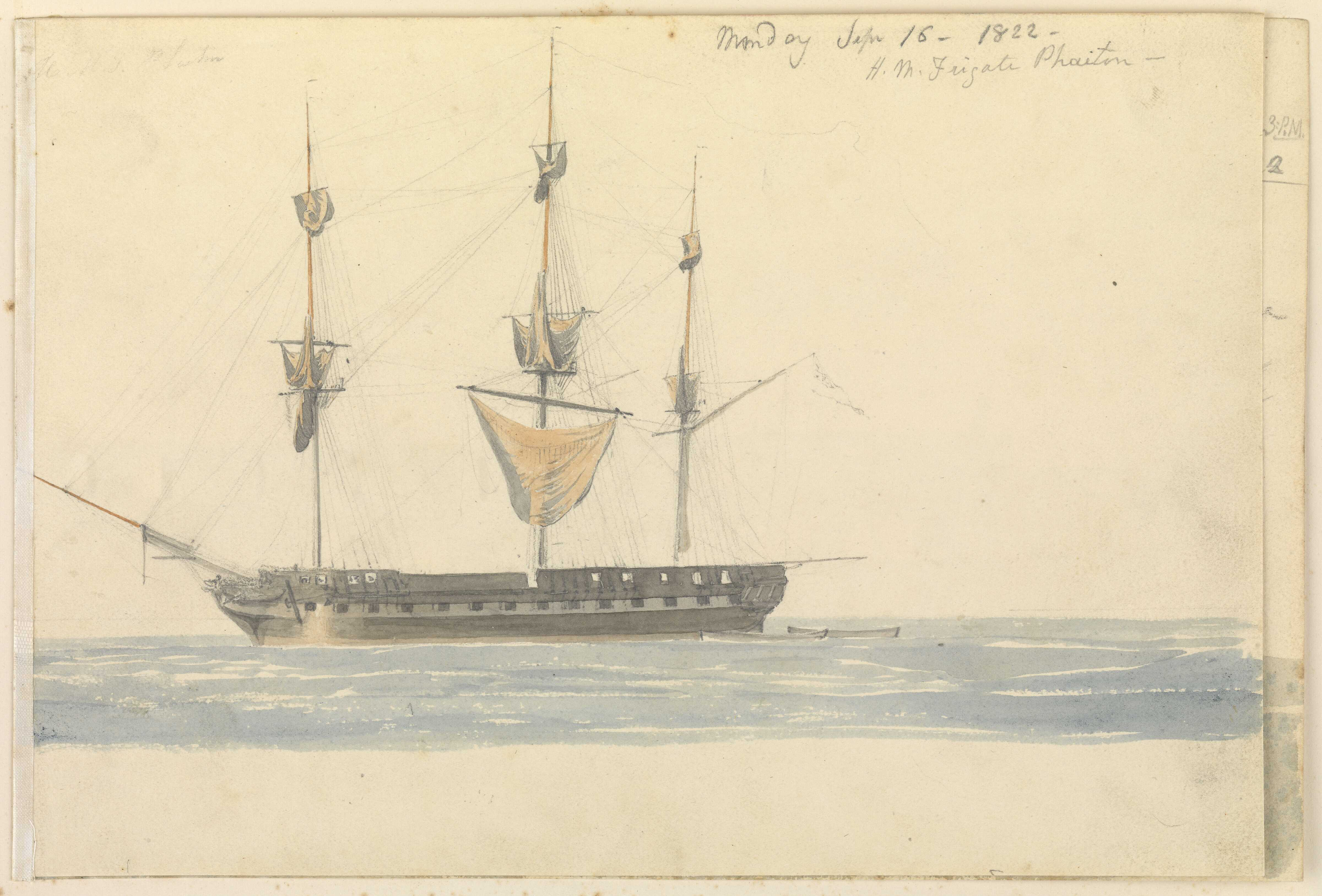
- 1822 illustration of Phaeton at Portsmouth Harbour

History

Great Britain
- Name: HMS Phaeton
- Operator: Royal Navy
- Ordered: 3 March 1780
- Builder: John Smallshaw, Liverpool
- Laid down: June 1780
- Launched: 12 June 1782
- Completed: 27 December 1782
- Commissioned: March 1782
- Honours and awards: Naval General Service Medal with clasp; "1 June 1794"; "27 Oct. Boat Service 1800".
- Fate: Sold for breaking up 26 March 1828

General characteristics
- Class & type: Minerva-class frigate
- Tons burthen: 944 (bm)
- Length: 141 ft 0 in (42.98 m)
- Beam: 39 ft 0 in (11.89 m)
- Depth of hold: 13 ft 10 in (4.22 m)
- Propulsion: Sail
- Complement: 280
- Armament: Upper deck: 28 × 18-pounder guns; QD: 8 × 9-pounder guns + 6 × 18-pounder carronades; Fc: 2 × 9-pounder guns + 4 × 18-pounder carronades

HMS Phaeton was a 38-gun Minerva-class fifth-rate frigate of the Royal Navy. She is best known for her intrusion into Nagasaki harbour in 1808. John Smallshaw (Smallshaw & Company) built Phaeton in Liverpool between 1780 and 1782. She participated in numerous engagements during the French Revolutionary Wars and the Napoleonic Wars during which service she captured many prizes. Francis Beaufort, inventor of the Beaufort scale, was a lieutenant on Phaeton when he distinguished himself during a successful cutting out expedition. Phaeton sailed to the Pacific in 1805, and returned in 1812. She was finally sold on 26 March 1828.

== Early years ==
Phaeton was commissioned in March 1782. Within a year she had been paid off.

== Service in the Channel ==
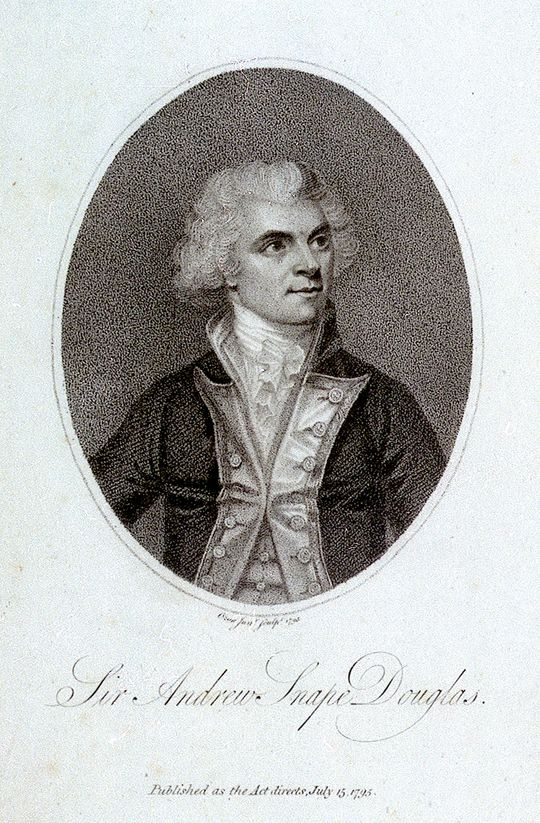
Sir Andrew Snape Douglas

In December 1792 Phaeton was commissioned under Sir Andrew Snape Douglas. In March 1793 Phaeton captured the 4-gun privateer lugger Aimable Liberté.

Then on 14 April Phaeton sighted the French privateer Général Dumourier (or Général Du Mourier), of twenty-two 6-pounder guns and 196 men, and her Spanish prize, the St Jago, 140 leagues to the west of Cape Finisterre. Phaeton was part of Admiral John Gell's squadron and the entire squadron set off in pursuit, but it was Phaeton that made the actual capture.

St Jago had been sailing from Lima to Spain when General Dumourier captured her on 11 April. In trying to fend off General Dumourier, St Jago fought for five hours, losing 10 men killed and 37 wounded, before she struck. She also suffered extensive damage to her upper works. St Jago's cargo, which had taken two years to collect, was the richest ever trusted on board a single ship. Early estimates put the value of the cargo as some £1.2 and £1.3 million. The most valuable portion of the cargo was a large number of gold bars that had a thin covering of pewter and that were listed on the manifest as "fine pewter". General Dumourier had taken on board 680 cases, each containing 3000 dollars, plus several packages worth two to three thousand pounds.

The ships that conveyed St Jago to Portsmouth were St George, Egmont, Edgar, Ganges and Phaeton. The money came over London Bridge in 21 wagons, escorted by a party of light dragoons, and lodged in the Tower of London.

On 11 December the High Court of Admiralty decided that the ship should be restored to Spain, less one eighth of the value after expenses for salvage, provided the Spanish released British ships held at Corunna. The agents for the captors appealed and on 4 February 1795 the Lords of the council (the Privy council) put the value of the cargo at £935,000 and awarded it to the captors. At the time, all the crew, captains, officers and admirals could expect to share in the prize. Admiral Hood's share was £50,000.

On 28 May Phaeton took the 20-gun Prompte off the Spanish Coast. The Royal Navy took Prompte into service under her existing name.

Together with Weazle, Phaeton took two privateers in the Channel in June - Poisson Volante, of ten guns, and Général Washington. On 27 November Phaeton and Latona were among the six vessels of a squadron that captured the 28-gun French corvette Blonde off Ushant.

In February 1794 Phaeton was paid off, but the next month Captain William Bentinck recommissioned her.

During the battle of the Glorious First of June, Phaeton came to the aid of the dismasted Defence. While doing so, Phaeton exchanged broadsides with the French ship-of-the-line Impétueux. Phaeton suffered three men killed and five wounded. She was the only one of the support vessels there to suffer casualties. In 1847 the Admiralty awarded the survivors to that date of all the vessels at the battle, including Phaeton, the Naval General Service Medal with clasp "1 June 1794".

== Captain Robert Stopford ==
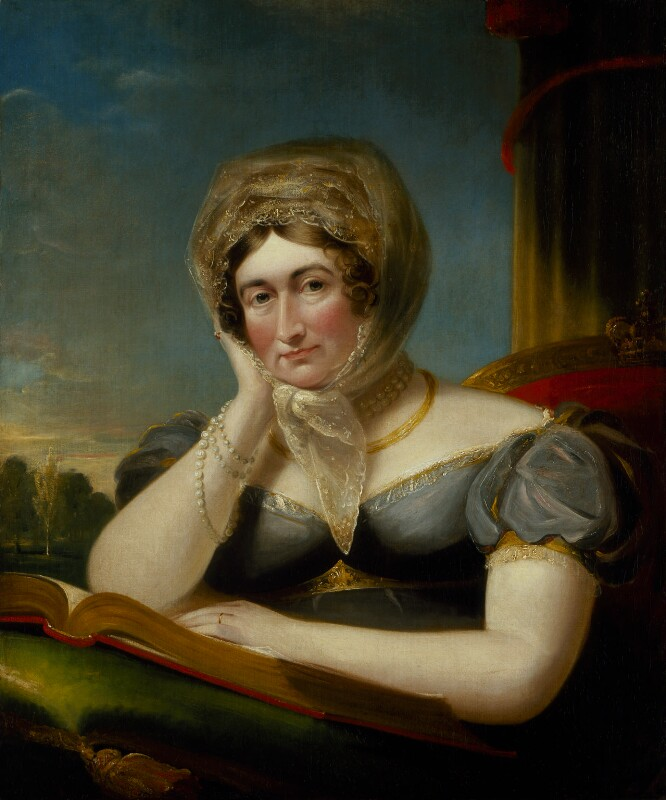
Portrait of Queen Caroline, ca. 1820, by James Lonsdale

In September, Phaeton came under the command of Captain Stopford. In May 1795 Phaeton escorted Princess Caroline of Brunswick to England. Then began what would become a spectacular string of prize-taking. During Stopford's service in the Channel, Phaeton captured some 13 privateers and three vessels of war, and also recovered numerous vessels that the French had taken.

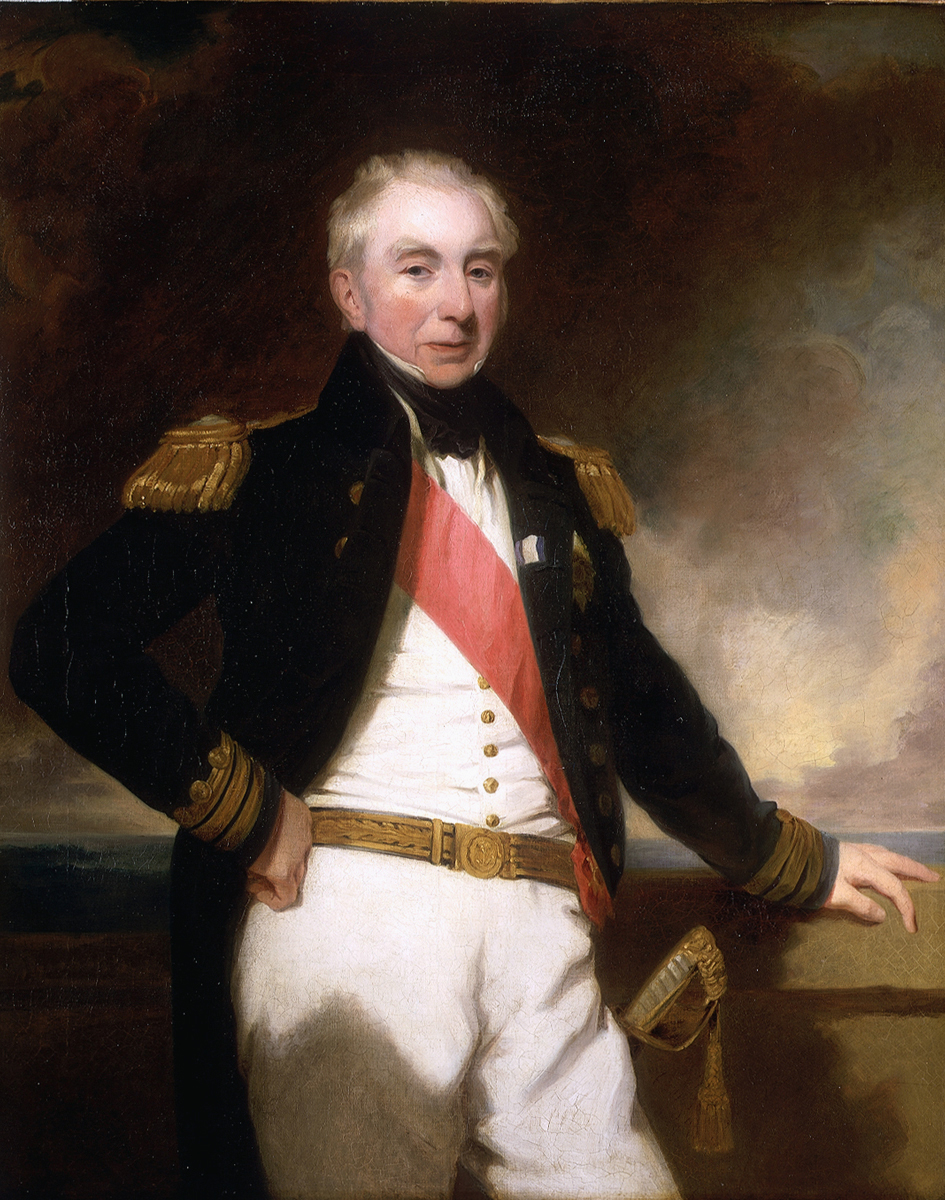
Admiral Sir Robert Stopford, c. 1840, by Frederick Richard Say, from the National Maritime Museum, Greenwich, London

On 10 March 1796, Phaeton engaged and captured the French corvette Bonne Citoyenne off Cape Finisterre. She was armed with twenty 9-pounder guns and had a crew of 145 men. She had left Rochefort on 4 March in company with the French frigates Forte, Seine, and Régénérée, and the brig Mutine, all sailing for the Île de France with troops and military supplies. Stopford took her back to England as his prize. The Royal Navy then bought her in as Bonne Citoyenne, a sixth-rate sloop-of-war.

While cruising in the Channel, on 6 March 1797, Phaeton took the French privateer Actif. She was armed with 18 guns and had a crew of 120 men. She had sailed from Nantes on 17 February and ten days later had captured the packet ship Princess Elizabeth, which was her only prize.

On 28 May, Phaeton, Melpomene, and the hired armed lugger Speedwell detained Frederickstadt.

On 16 September Phaeton took the 6-gun Chasseur. Then two days later she took the privateer Brunette. Then with Unite she took 16-gun Indien on 24 September off the Roches Bonnes. On 9 October Unite captured Découverte, with the 32-gun frigate Stag and Phaeton in company. (Note: Découverte had been launched in 1896 as Papillon, renamed Parleur, and then in 1795 renamed to Découverte.)

Phaeton also recaptured three British vessels. These were Adamant (24 September), Arcade (3 October), and Recovery (20 October).

Then on 28 December Phaeton took the 12-gun Hazard in the Bay of Biscay. The next day, the 44-gun Anson, Captain Philip Charles Durham, with Phaeton, retook the 20-gun Sphinx-class post ship Daphne, which the French had captured almost exactly three years earlier. Out of a crew of 276, including 30 passengers of various descriptions, Daphne, lost five men killed and several wounded before she surrendered. Anson had no casualties.

On New Year's Day, 1798, Phaeton took Aventure. On 19 February she took the 18-gun Légère in the Channel. On 21 February 1798 she, Nymphe, and Mermaid recaptured American armed mechantman "Eliza" (49°10′N 10°30′W) that had been captured by French privateer "Don Guicote" on 13 February (seems to be some conflicting info on which ship actually made the capture). On 22 March she participated in damaging the 36-gun frigate Charente near the Cordouan lighthouse. Phaeton fired on Charente, chasing her first into range of the guns of the 74-gun third rate Canada, under the command of Captain Sir John Borlase Warren, with whom she exchanged broadsides. Charente grounded, but then so did Canada. Phaeton and Anson had to abandon the chase to pull Canada free. In the meantime, Charente threw her guns overboard, floated free, and reached the river of Bordeaux, much the worse for wear.

With Anson, Phaeton took the 18-gun privateer Mercure on 31 August. Mercure was pierced for 20 guns and had a crew of 132 men. She was one day out of Bordeaux and had captured nothing. (Note: Mercure was a former British merchant vessel that the French had captured in May 1793. She had then served in the French Navy, first as Mercury of London and then under other names until in February 1798 the French Navy renamed her Mercure and handed her over at Bordeaux for service as a privateer. Although Stopford described her as "quite a new Vessel, Copper-bottomed and fastened", by 1798 she was at least five years old.)

A week later, Anson and Phaeton captured the 32-gun privateer Flore after a 24-hour-long chase. Stopford, in his letter, described Flore as a frigate of 36 guns and 255 men. She was eight days out of Boulogne on a cruise. Flore had also served the Royal Navy in the American Revolutionary War.

Then on 8 October Phaeton took the 16-gun privateer Lévrier. Together with Ambuscade and Stag, on 20 November she took Hirondelle. (Note: Hirondelle was the former British privateer Swallow, probably the cutter by that name, Thomas Amos, master, 189 tons burthen (bm), of sixteen 9-pounder guns. Amos had received a letter of marque on 25 February 1793. Hirondelle apparently carried sixteen 4-pounder guns and a crew of 127 men.)

On 24 November 1798, Phaeton captured the French privateer brig Resolue (or Resolu). Resolue was armed with 18 guns and carried a crew of 70 men. She had previously captured the English merchant ship General Wolfe, sailing from Poole to Newfoundland and an American sloop sailing from Boston to Hamburg. Stag later recaptured the American.

On 6 December, Phaeton and Stag captured the French privateer brig Resource. She was armed with 10 guns and carried a crew of 66 men. She had sailed from La Rochelle two days previously and was sailing for the African coast. Ambuscade shared in the prize money for both Resolu and Resource.

On 11 April 1799 she recaptured American brig "Nymph" captured by a privateer on 13 March. She was sent in to Plymouth.

== Mediterranean ==
In July 1799 Captain Sir James Nicoll Morris took command of Phaeton and sailed with Lord Elgin, of the eponymous Elgin Marbles, for Constantinople. She arrived at the Dardanelles on 2 November. Elgin would be Britain's ambassador to the Ottoman Empire until 1803. In May 1800 she participated in the blockade of Genoa as part of Lord Keith's squadron. The Austrian general besieging the city, Baron d'Ott, particularly appreciated her fire in support of the Austrian army.

On 14 April 1800 Phaeton and Peterel captured the St. Rosalia. Phaeton had to share her share of the proceeds with five vessels due to a prior agreement.

On 3 May, Mutine, Phaeton and Cameleon captured eight vessels in Anguilla Bay:

- Stella de Nort;
- Santa Maria;
- Nostra Senora del Carmine;
- Fiat Volantes Deus;
- Nostra Signora del Assunta;
- Nostra Signora de Sonsove;
- San Nicolas; and
- San Joseph (San Giuseppe).

Five days later they captured eleven Genoese vessels. They captured the first eight at St Remo:

- Polacre ship St. Giovanni, which was sailing in ballast from St Remo;
- Polacre brig Achille, which was sailing from Marseilles to Genoa with a cargo of corn and wine;
- Polacre barque St. Antonio, which was sailing from Cette to Genoa with a cargo of wine;
- Polacre brig Santa (Assunta), which was sailing from Ard to Port Maurice with a cargo of wine;
- Polacre ship Conception, sailing in ballast to Port Maurice;
- Polacre ship Madona del Carmine, sailing from Cette to Genoa with a cargo of wine;
- Settee Signora del Carmine, which was sailing from Marseilles to Genoa with a cargo of corn;
- Settee St. Giuseppe, which was sailing from Marseilles to Port Maurice with a cargo of corn;
- Settee Immaculate Conception, which was sailing from Cette to Genoa with a cargo of wine;
- Settee Amina Purgatorio, which sailing from Cette to Genoa with a cargo of wine; and
- Settee Virgine Rosaria, which was sailing from Cette to Genoa with a cargo of wine.

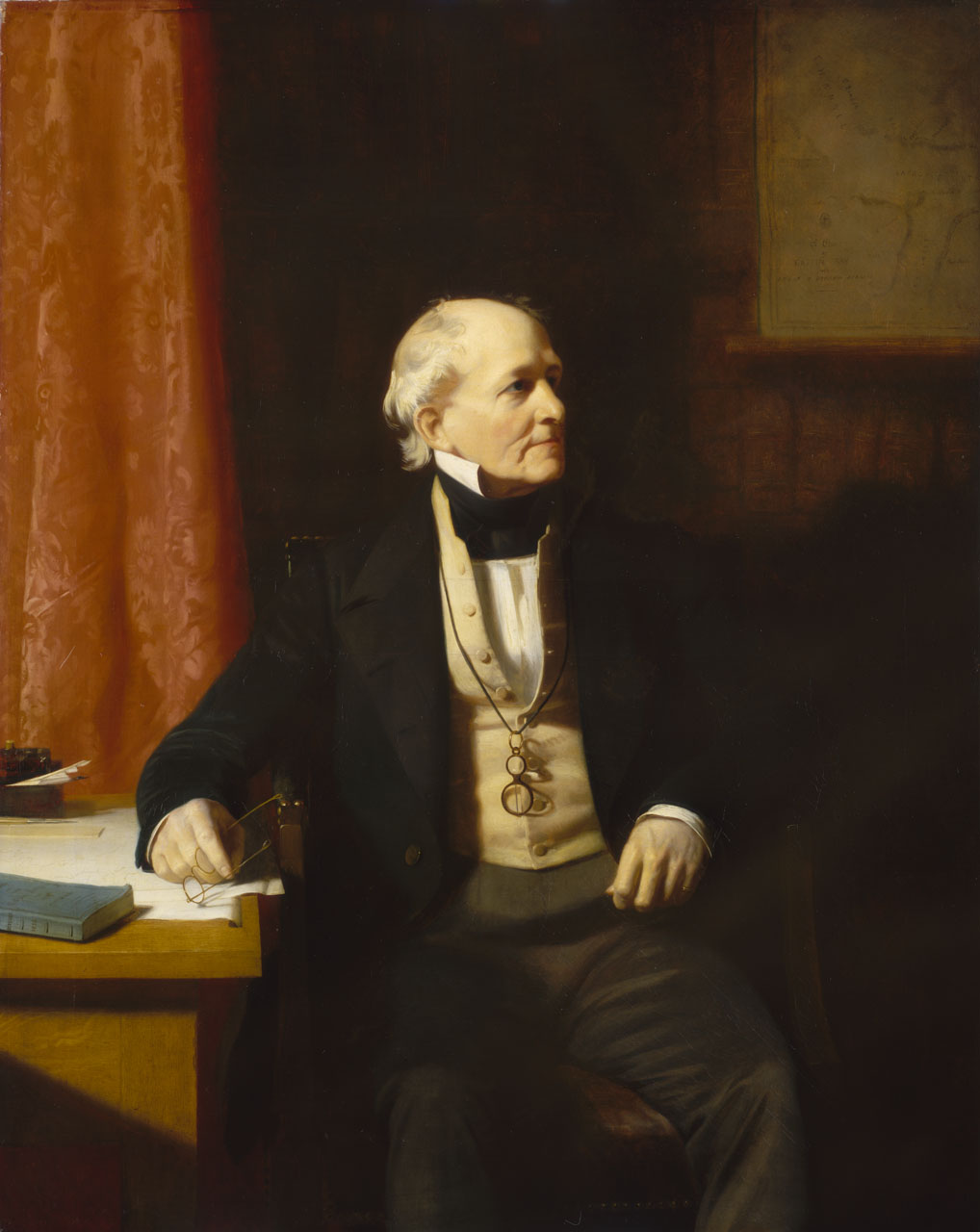
Francis Beaufort

On 25 October Phaeton chased a Spanish polacca to an anchorage under a battery of five heavy guns at Fuengirola, where she joined a French privateer brig. The following night the brig escaped while the polacca tried twice, unsuccessfully, to escape to Málaga. On the night of 27 October, Francis Beaufort led Phaeton's boats on a cutting out expedition. (Note: Fortuitously, Beaufort had served with Stopford on Aquilon some years earlier.) Unfortunately the launch, with a carronade, was unable to keep up and was still out of range when a French privateer schooner, which had come into the anchorage unseen, fired on the other boats. The barge and two cutters immediately made straight for the polacca and succeeded in securing her by 5 am. The captured ship was San Josef, alias Aglies, of two 24-pounder iron guns, two brass 18-pounder guns as stern chasers, four brass 12-pounder guns and six 6-pounder guns. She was a packet, carrying provisions between Málaga and Velilla. She had a crew of 49 seamen, though 15 were away, and there were also 22 soldiers on board to act as marines.

The boarding party suffered one man killed and three wounded, including Beaufort who received, but survived, 19 wounds. (Note: In November 1801 the Navy awarded Beaufort a pension of £45 12s. 6d. per annum for his wounds.) The Spanish sustained at least 13 wounded.

Once Morris was sure that his men had secured the prize he sailed Phaeton in pursuit of a second polacca that had passed earlier, sailing from Ceuta to Málaga. Phaeton was able to catch her under a battery at Cape Molleno. While Phaeton was returning to pick up Beaufort, his men and their prize, the French privateer schooner sailed past, too far away for Phaeton to intercept.

The British immediately commissioned San Josef as a British sloop-of-war under the name Calpe, the ancient name for Gibraltar. Although it would have been usual to promote Beaufort, the successful and heroic leader of the expedition, to command Calpe, Lord Keith chose instead George Dundas who not only was not present at the battle, but was junior to Beaufort. In 1847 the Admiralty awarded the survivors to that date of the boarding party the Naval General Service Medal with clasp "27 Oct. Boat Service 1800".

On 16 May 1801, boats from Phaeton and Naiad under the direction of Naiad's first lieutenant, entered the port of Marín, Pontevedra, in Galicia in north west Spain. There they captured the Spanish corvette Alcudia and destroyed the armed packet Raposo, both under the protection of a battery of five 24-pounders. Alcudia, commanded by Don Jean Antonio Barbuto, was moored stem and stern close to the fort. Her sails had previously been taken ashore so the boats had to tow her out but soon after a strong south-west wind set in and it was necessary to set her on fire. Only four men from the two British ships were wounded.

Phaeton then returned to Britain and was paid off in March 1802.

== East Indies ==
In July 1803 Captain George Cockburn recommissioned Phaeton for service in the Far East. Later in 1804 she and HMS Lancaster chased the French privateer Henriette back to Port Louis. Also, Phaeton recaptured the Mornington, which the French privateer Nicholas Surcouf in Caroline had captured on 14 August 1804; Captain Fallonard of the brig Île de France recaptured Mornington. The British recaptured Mornington again as she continued to sail under the British Ensign until she was burnt in the Bay of Bengal in 1816.

On 2 August 1805, under Captain John Wood, Phaeton fought the 40-gun Sémillante, Captain Léonard-Bernard Motard, in the San Bernardino Strait off San Jacinto, Philippines, together with the 18-gun Cruizer-class brig-sloop Harrier, Captain Edward Ratsey. After exchanges of fire first with Harrier and then with Phaeton, Sémillante took refuge under the guns of a shore battery. Unable to dislodge her, the two British vessels eventually sailed off, each having suffered two men wounded. Sémillante was reported to have suffered 13 killed and 36 wounded. After resupplying at San Jacinto, Sémillante intended to sail for Mexico in March 1805 to fetch specie for the Philippines; the encounter with Phaeton and Harrier foiled the plan. Motard returned to the Indian Ocean, operating for the next three years against British shipping from Île de France.

On 18 November 1805 Phaeton was at Saint Helena. There she took on board 32 officers and crew from the East Indiaman Brunswick, which the French had captured. The French had released them at the Cape of Good Hope and a cartel had delivered them to St Helena. Phaeton was already carrying the Marquis of Wellesley and his suite, who was returning to England after having served as Governor General of India. They arrived at Spithead on 13 January 1806.

In October 1806 Captain John Wood took command of Phaeton. Then in July 1808, Captain Fleetwood Pellew succeeded him.

== Nagasaki Harbour incident ==
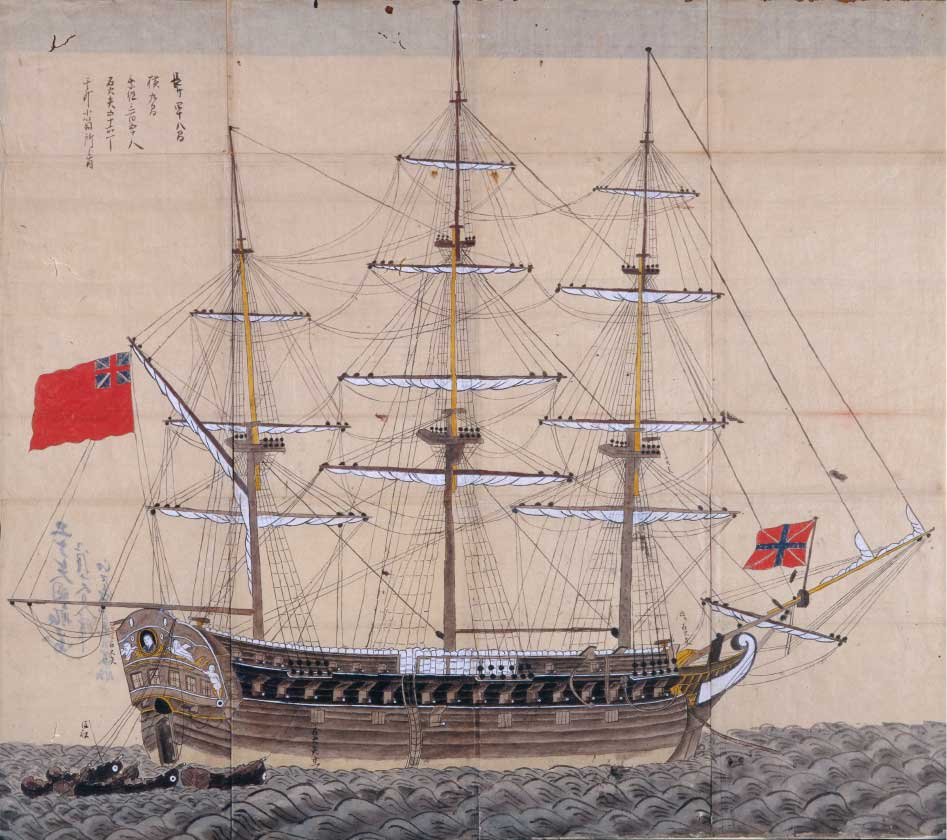
Contemporary Japanese illustration of Phaeton

On 4 October 1808, Phaeton entered Nagasaki's bay flying a false Dutch flag to ambush two Dutch merchantmen expected to arrive shortly at the Dutch trading post of Dejima. Despite the ship's arrival being later in the season than normal, she aroused no suspicions among those in Nagasaki. The Nagasaki bugyō, Matsudaira Yasuhide, sent out a reception boat to Phaeton, which lowered a ship's boat and seized two Dutchmen from the boat. Informed of Phaeton's hostile intentions, Yasuhide mobilised the Nagasaki garrison, requested reinforcements from nearby areas and discussed response options with Dejima's commissioner, Hendrik Doeff. False rumours circulated around Nagasaki, while Yasuhide made plans to destroy Phaeton with fireships.

By the morning of 5 October Pellew learnt through interrogation that the two Dutchmen knew nothing of the expected merchantmen and notified Yasuhide that they would be released in exchange for food, water and fuel. Yasuhide, having ascertained Phaeton's true identity and realising his fireship plan was infeasible, provided the provisions. However, Pellew deemed them inadequate and retained the Dutchmen, demanding further provisions and threatening to destroy all the ships in the bay if they weren't sent. Though Yasuhide was incensed by Pellew's new demand, Doeff persuaded him to comply and the British released the two Dutchmen. On the morning of 6 October Yasuhide instructed Phaeton to depart, which she did on the same day.

== After Nagasaki ==
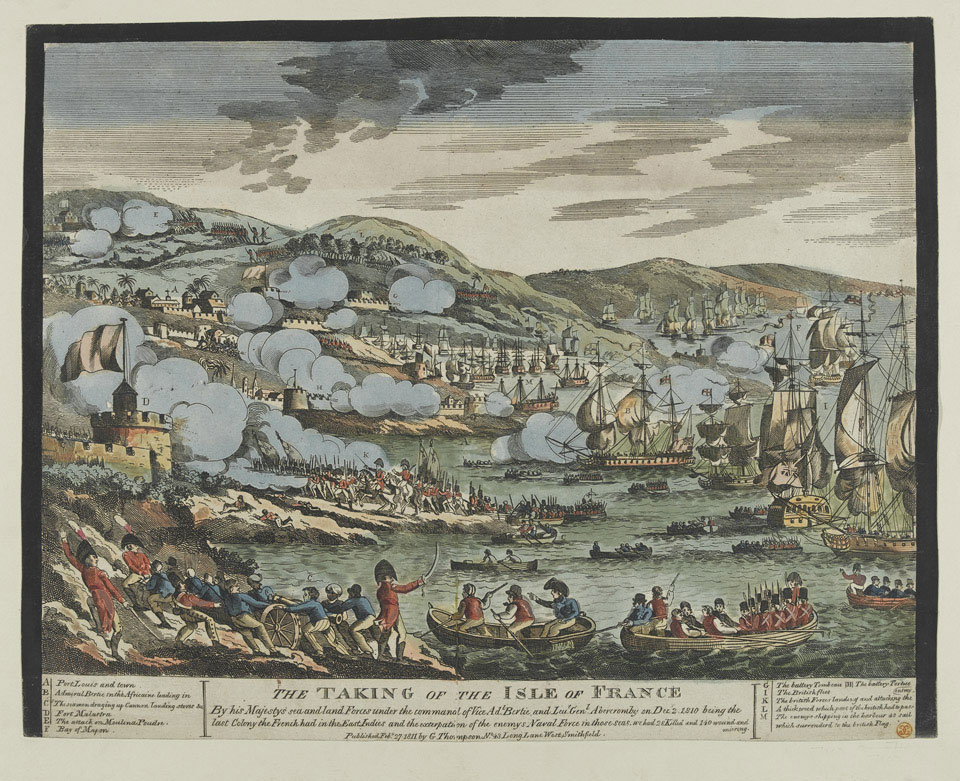
The invasion of Isle de France, which Phaeton participated in

Pellew was confirmed in his rank of post-captain on 14 October 1808, and went on to see action in the invasion of Isle de France in 1810 and the reduction of Java in 1811. In May, Phaeton escorted the second division of British troops, commanded by Major-General Frederick Augustus Wetherall, from Madras to Prince of Wales Island, and then on to Malacca. Once the expedition reached Batavia, Phaeton and three of the other frigates patrolled for French frigates known to be in the area.

On 31 August a landing party from Phaeton and Sir Francis Drake, together with marines from Hussar, captured a fort from the French at Sumenep on the island of Madura, off Java. The British suffered three men killed and 28 wounded. Pellew sailed Phaeton home in August 1812, escorting a convoy of East Indiamen. For his services he received a present of 500 guineas and the thanks of the East India Company.

== Post-war ==
In 1816, Capt. Frances Stanfell sailed Phaeton from Sheerness, bound for Saint Helena and the Cape of Good Hope. She arrived at St Helena on 14 April 1816, where she delivered its newly appointed military governor, Lieutenant-General Sir Hudson Lowe, his wife, Susan de Lancey Lowe, and her two daughters by a former marriage. Lowe had been expressly sent to the island to serve as the gaolor of Napoleon Bonaparte, who would die there in exile in 1821.

In April 1818, Capt. W. H. Dillon commissioned Phaeton. In the autumn of 1818 Lieutenant John Geary, who had joined Phaeton at her re-commissioning, faced a court martial. (Note: This was at least Geary's second court martial. In 1810 he was captain of Mullett when he was found guilty of not having done his utmost to follow orders to sail to South America. At that time he was severely reprimanded.) The charges were that he had concealed two deserters from the band of the 18th Regiment of Foot. More formally, the charges were: "Inveigling musicians from one of the Regiments in garrison and with practicing deception towards the officers who were sent on board to search for them." The board found him guilty. He was severely reprimanded and dismissed from Phaeton. Robert Cavendish Spencer, late of Ganymede, a captain on the board, thought enough of Geary to shake his hand and offer him a job in the future. Several years later Spencer made good on his offer.

Phaeton went on to the East Indies. In October 1819 she was paid off and then recommissioned within the month under Captain William Augustus Montagu, for Halifax. She was paid off in September 1822. She was immediately recommissioned under Captain Henry Evelyn Pitfield Sturt. She sailed for Gibraltar and Algeciras and was paid off some three years later.

== Fate ==
Phaeton was sold on 11 July 1827 to a Mr. Freake for £3,430, but the Navy Office cancelled the sale, "Mr. Freake having been declared insane." She was finally sold on 26 March 1828 for £2,500 to Joshua Cristall for breaking up.

== In popular media ==
The Nagasaki Harbour Incident plays a role in the novel The Thousand Autumns of Jacob de Zoet by David Mitchell. However, this depiction is highly fictionalized; the ship in the novel is HMS Phoebus, the incident occurs in 1800 and finding no Dutch ships the Phoebus of the novel, commanded by a Captain Penhaligon who is considerably older than the historical figure at this time, bombards Dejima.

The Nagasaki Harbour Incident plays a role in the novel Blood of Tyrants by Naomi Novik. This depiction is historical fantasy; the Japanese sink HMS Phaeton with dragons stationed at Nagasaki at the time.

== See also ==
- Anglo-Japanese relations
