= Clarendon (ship) =

Several ships have been named Clarendon:

- Clarendon (1783 ship) was built at Bristol as a West Indiaman.
- Clarendon (1792 ship) was built at Lancaster as a West Indiaman. She spent most of her career sailing between England and Jamaica. She then became a transport based out of Hull. She wrecked on 7 April 1815 while bringing prisoners as a cartel from Bermuda to the United States.
- Clarendon (1804 ship) was launched in France in 1788, under another name. She was taken in prize in 1804. In 1805 Clarendon began a voyage as a slave ship in the triangular trade in enslaved people but fell prey to Spanish privateers after she had embarked slaves.
- Clarendon (1807 ship) was built at Whitehaven. Between 1808 or so and 1813 she sailed as a West Indiaman between London and Jamaica. In 1814 she sailed for Batavia under a license from the British East India Company (EIC). The privateer Young Wasp captured her off the Cape of Good Hope (the Cape), on 6 January 1815, and she arrived at Baltimore on 15 April.
- Clarendon (1827 ship), of 450 tons (bm), was launched at London in 1827. In 183 she brought Chinese labourers to Trinidad, and was the second such vessel to arrive there during the 1853-1866 importation of Chinese labourers.
- Clarendon (1855 ship), cargo ship, was launched in 1855 by Andrew Leslie & Co, Hebburn. Wrecked off Estonia in 1872.
- Clarendon (APA-72) was launched 12 September 1944. On 22 May 1945, Clarendon made three voyages from San Diego and San Francisco to Pearl Harbor, carrying passengers and cargo back and forth. A county in South Carolina is named after this ship.
