= Ortensia =

Ortensia can refer to:

- Ortensia the Cat, an animated cat created by Ub Iwerks and Walt Disney
- Ortensia (horse), an Australian thoroughbred racehorse
- Ortensia, a unit from the Re:Stage! franchise
- French schooner Ortensia
