= HMS Calpe (1800) =

Sloop of the Royal Navy

History

Spain
- Name: San José
- Launched: 1796
- Captured: By the Royal Navy, 27 October 1800

General characteristics (in Spanish service)
- Type: Polacca
- Complement: 34 seamen & 22 soldiers
- Armament: 14 guns

United Kingdom
- Name: HMS Calpe
- Acquired: By capture, 27 October 1800
- Honours and awards: Naval General Service Medal with clasp "Gut of Gibraltar 12 July 1801"
- Fate: Sold, 1802

United Kingdom
- Name: Calpe
- Owner: W. Boyd
- Acquired: By purchase
- Fate: Wrecked 1805

General characteristics (in British service)
- Type: Sloop-of-war
- Tons burthen: 209, or 211, or 212 (bm)
- Length: 75 ft 4 in (23.0 m) (overall): 57 ft 0 in (17.4 m) (keel)
- Beam: 26 ft 3 in (8.0 m)
- Depth of hold: 12 ft 6 in (3.8 m)
- Complement: 49 seamen + 22 soldiers
- Armament: HMS; 2 × long 24-pounder guns (bows); 2 × long brass 18-pounder guns (stern); 4 × 12 pounder & 4 × 4-pounder guns; Merchantman:8 × 4-pounder guns + 2 × 12-pounder guns (of the "New Construction")

HMS Calpe was the former 14-gun polacca San José of the Spanish Navy, originally built in 1796 in Greece. The British captured her in 1800 and commissioned her as a sloop-of-war. She served at the Battle of Algeciras Bay before the Navy sold her in 1802. She underwent repairs and reappeared as a merchantman in the 1805 registers; however, she wrecked at the Dardanelles in 1805.

== Capture ==
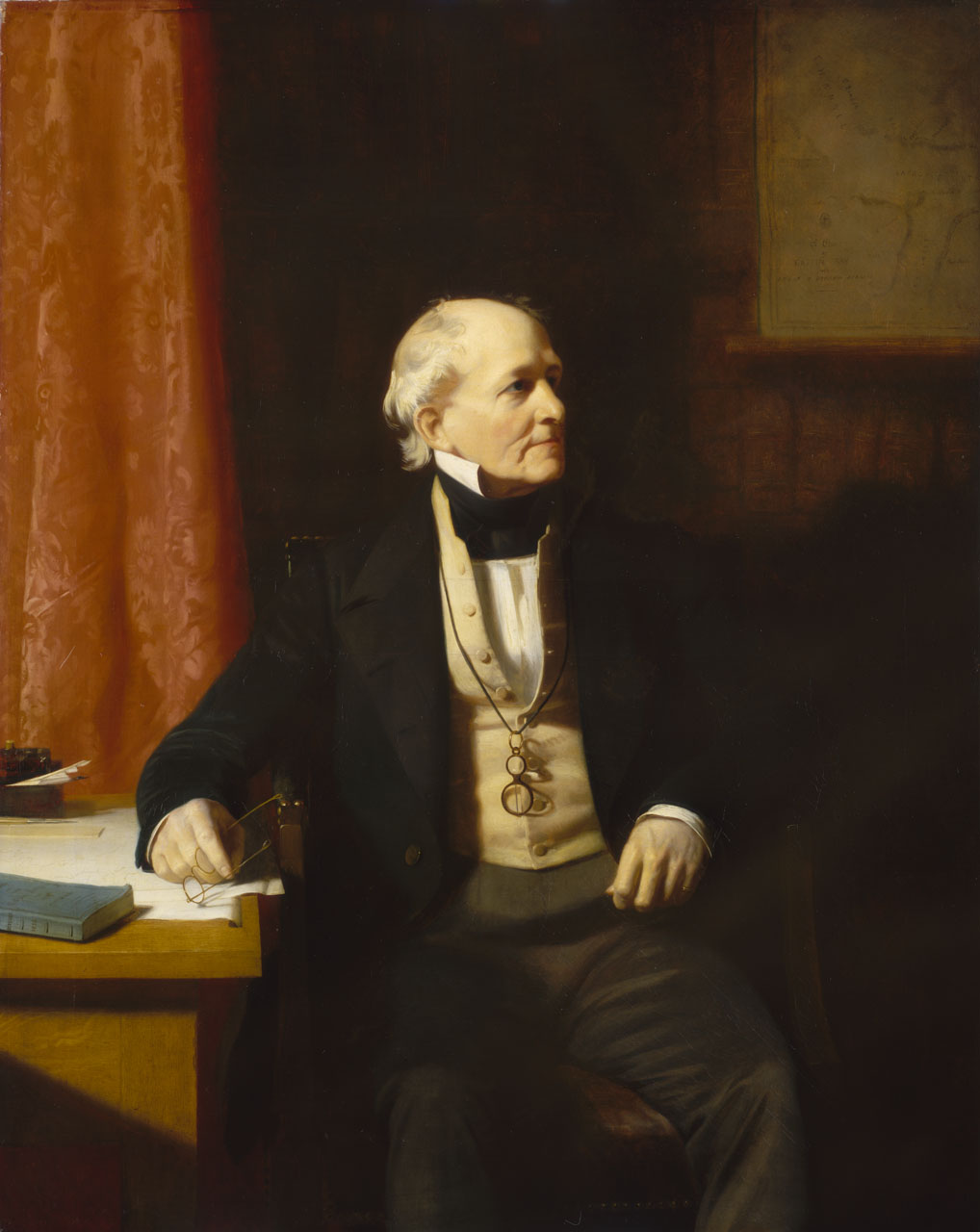
Francis Beaufort

On 25 October 1800, the frigate Phaeton chased a Spanish polacca to an anchorage under a battery of five heavy guns at Fuengirola, where she joined a French privateer brig. The following night the brig escaped while the polacca tried twice, unsuccessfully, to escape to Málaga. On the night of 27 October, Francis Beaufort, later inventor of the Beaufort Wind-Scale, led Phaeton's boats on a cutting out expedition. Unfortunately the launch, with a carronade, was unable to keep up and was still out of range when a French privateer schooner, which had come into the anchorage unseen, fired on the other boats. The barge and two cutters immediately made straight for the polacca. The boarding party suffered one man killed and three wounded, including Beaufort who received, but survived, 19 wounds. The boarding party succeeded in securing the polacca by 5 am. The captured ship was San José, alias Aglies, of 14 guns. She had been employed as a packet, carrying provisions between Málaga and Velilla. She had a crew of 34 seamen and there were also 22 soldiers on board. The Spanish sustained at least 13 wounded. The British immediately commissioned San José as a British sloop-of-war under the name of Calpe, the ancient name of Gibraltar. Although it would have been usual to promote Beaufort, the successful and heroic leader of the expedition, to command Calpe, Lord Keith chose Commander George Dundas instead, who not only was not present at the battle, but was junior to Beaufort.

== British service ==
When Calpe was first commissioned in the Royal Navy there were insufficient Royal Marines available for her. As a stop-gap, she received a mixed detachment of 22 Army troops from the Gibraltar Garrison, the Royal Artillery, 5th and 63rd Foot, Cambrian Rangers, and the Argyll, Banffshire and Prince of Wales' Own Fencibles, all under the command of an officer from the 5th Foot. Even after the marines arrived, the troops stayed aboard for some more months.

Calpe shared with a number of warships in the capture of Eurydice on 9 February 1801.

Sometime before 4 July, 1801 American brig "Neptune" had been detained, along with her paperwork, at Algeciras, but she escaped during the night and went to Gibraltar where she was detained by Calpe for not having paperwork. The paperwork was sent from Spain and she was released.

== Battle of Algeciras Bay ==
By 1 July 1801 she was at Gibraltar. While there she observed the arrival of a French squadron. On 5 July, at 2 a.m., Lieutenant Richard Janvarin, whom Dundas had dispatched from Gibraltar, joined Rear Adm. James Saumarez in Caesar in a boat, and informed Sir James of the appearance of the French squadron off the Rock.

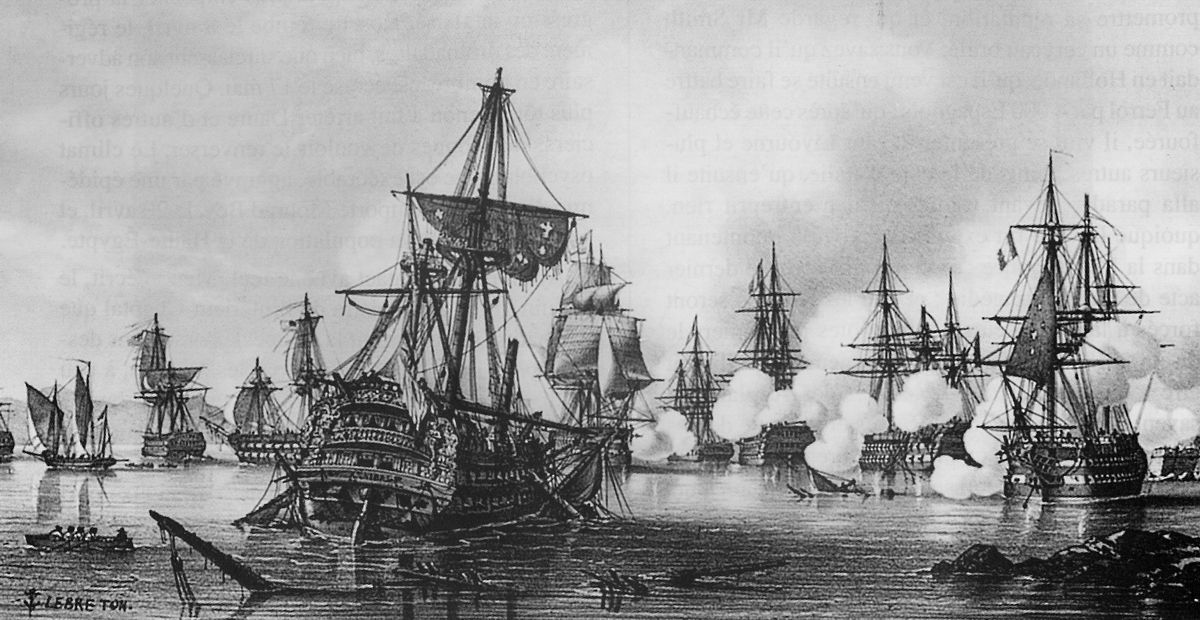
HMS Hannibal (left foreground) lies aground and dismasted at the Battle of Algeciras Bay.

On 6 July Saumarez sailed from Gibraltar with Caesar, Pompee, Spencer, Venerable, Hannibal and Audacious with the intention of attacking Admiral Linois's squadron of three French line-of-battle ships and a frigate, which were lying a considerable distance from the batteries at Algeciras. As Venerable, the leading ship, approached the wind dropped and she was forced to anchor. Pompee managed to get into action but Hannibal grounded and was forced to strike. Dundas, deceived by a signal from Hannibal, sent his boats to save Hannibal's crew. The French detained the boats and their crews, including Calpe's lieutenant, Thomas Sykes; after firing several broadsides at the enemy's shipping and batteries, Calpe returned to Gibraltar. In the battle the British drove two of the French ships ashore and badly damaged the rest. The total loss in the British squadron was 121 killed, 240 wounded, and 14 missing. The Franco-Spanish force lost 317 men killed and some 3-500 wounded.

On 8 July a squadron of five Spanish ships-of-the-line, a French 74, three frigates and a large number of gunboats reinforced the French ships. Hard work repaired all the British ships at Gibraltar, except Pompee in time for them to follow the Franco-Spanish fleet when it sailed on 12 July. In the subsequent second phase of the Battle of Algeciras Bay, the two first rates Real Carlos and San Hermenegildo fired upon each other during the night, caught fire and exploded, with tremendous loss of life. The British captured the third rate St Antoine, with Superb and Calpe assisting afterwards in securing the prize and removing the prisoners. Calpe later shared in the prize money for St Antoine's hull and provisions, and in the head money for St Antoine, Real Carlos, and San Hermenegildo. Dundas was made Post-captain on 9 August and took command of St Antoine, which he sailed back to England.

Saumarez then appointed Lieutenant John Lamburn (or Lamborn), first lieutenant of Caesar, to command Calpe. However, the Admiralty did not confirm Saumarez's promotions, except that of Dundas. Among other decisions, it returned Lamburn to Caesar, and replaced him as captain of Calpe with Commander Phillip Dumaresque. (Dumaresque had been a lieutenant aboard Caesar and received his promotion in July when he arrived in London with Saumarez's dispatches.) In subsequent months Calpe assisted the 38-gun frigate Thames, under Captain Aiskew Paffard Hollis, which had also participated in the battle, in destroying a number of the enemy's coasters in the bay of Estepona. In 1847 the Admiralty issued the Naval General Service Medal with clasp "Gut of Gibraltar 12 July 1801" to all surviving claimants from the battle.

== Sale ==
Calpe was sold in Lisbon in 1802. On 2 August 1803 Lloyd's List reported that Calpee and Sir Andrew Mitchell had arrived at Portsmouth from Lisbon with 380 men of the crew of HMS Victorious. Victorious had been broken up at Lisbon.

== Merchantman ==
Calpe entered Lloyd's Register and the Register of Shipping in 1805 with G. Jillard, master, W. Boyd, owner, and trade London–Smyrna. She had undergone a thorough repair in 1804. Lloyd's Register had her origin as Cartagena, Spain. The Register of Shipping simply had it as Spain. On 7 May 1805, Lloyd's List reported that Calpe, Jellard, master, was on shore at the Dardanelles and was feared to be lost.
