= Salisbury (ship) =

Several vessels have been named Salisbury:

- Salisbury (1781 ship) was built at Havana c.1761 under another name. She first appeared under British ownership in 1781 as a West Indiaman. In 1785 she became the northern whale fishery whaler Rebecca. In 1787 new owners renamed her Harpooner and she was briefly a northern whaler in the Davis Strait. She was wrecked in 1789.
- Salisbury, of 127 tons (bm), was launched at Sunderland in 1803. She was last listed in 1839 with minimal data.
- Salisbury (1807 ship) was launched at Howdon. The Transport Board (Royal Navy) engaged her to support the British attack on Copenhagen. She was wrecked while bringing troops back to England after the city's surrender.
- Salisbury, of 115 tons (bm), was launched at Yarmouth in 1810
- Salisbury, of 118 tons (bm), was launched at Portugal in 1812 and was lost on 3 October 1825 when she was driven ashore and wrecked on Götaland, Sweden. She had been on a voyage from Liverpool, to Saint Petersburg.
- Salisbury, of 120 tons (bm), was a foreign prize that first appeared in Lloyd's Register in 1815 and was still carried in the Register of Shipping in 1833.
- Salisbury (1818 ship), of 117 tons (bm), was launched c.1814 in the Brazils, almost certainly under another name. She was possibly captured by the British or sold to British owners in 1818. She made one voyage seal hunting and was lost in 1827.

== See also ==
- HMS Salisbury – any of seven vessels of the British Royal Navy
