= Edward Jordan (pirate) =

Irish rebel and pirate (1771–1809)

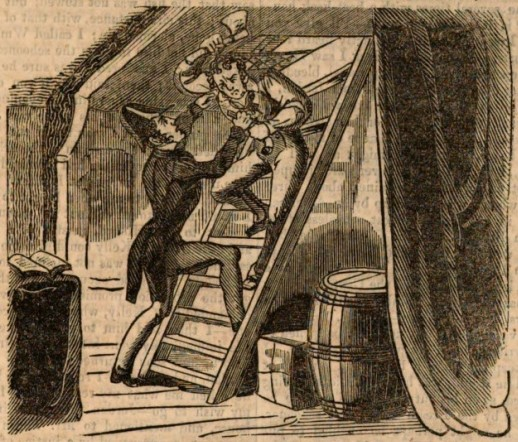
Edward Jordan attacking Captain John Stairs with an axe (illustration published in "The Annals of Crime, and New Newgate Calendar", 1834)

Edward Jordan (c. 1771–1809) was an Irish rebel, fisherman, and pirate in Nova Scotia. He was typical of the violent but short-lived pirates in the 19th century following the end of the "Golden Age of Piracy" in the 18th century.

Born in County Carlow, Ireland, he took part in the Irish rebellions of 1797–1798 but was pardoned and attempted to start a new life as a fisherman in Nova Scotia. However, his seasonal fishing operation based at Gaspe Bay was unsuccessful, and he racked up large debts. Halifax merchants seized his fishing schooner, The Three Sisters, and on 13 September 1809, desperate to avoid losing the schooner, he tried to murder all of the crew sent to seize the ship. He killed two sailors but the captain, John Stairs, was only wounded and managed to escape overboard. Stairs was rescued by a passing fishing schooner and survived to spread the alarm. A few weeks later the Royal Navy schooner HMS Cuttle captured Jordan.

Jordan was convicted of piracy and executed in Halifax, Nova Scotia later that year. His body was covered in tar and hanged from chains in an iron cage called a gibbet at Black Rock Beach in Point Pleasant as a warning to others. His gibbet joined those of four others across the harbour on McNabs Island who had been executed for mutiny aboard the brig HMS Columbine in the same year. His skull was eventually deposited at the Nova Scotia Museum. It was recently displayed in the exhibit "Pirates: Myth and Reality" at the Maritime Museum of the Atlantic in Halifax.
