= HMS Barracouta (1804) =

History

United Kingdom
- Name: HMS Barracouta
- Ordered: 23 June 1803
- Builder: Goodrich & Co. (prime contractor), Bermuda
- Laid down: 1803
- Launched: 1804
- Fate: Wrecked 3 October 1805

General characteristics
- Type: Ballahoo-class schooner
- Tons burthen: 70 41/94 (bm)
- Length: 55 ft 2 in (16.8 m) (overall); 40 ft 10 1/2 in (12.5 m) (keel)
- Beam: 18 ft 0 in (5.5 m)
- Depth of hold: 9 ft 0 in (2.7 m)
- Sail plan: Schooner
- Complement: 20
- Armament: 4 × 12-pounder carronades

HMS Barracouta was a Royal Navy Ballahoo-class schooner. The prime contractor for the vessel was Goodrich & Co., in Bermuda, and she was launched in 1804. Like many of her class and the related Cuckoo-class schooners, she succumbed to the perils of the sea relatively early in her career.

She was commissioned under Lieutenant Joel Orchard and was wrecked on 3 October 1805. Barracouta had been sailing in company with Pique and Port Mahon but became separated from them in a gale. The next day Orchard discovered that he was not as far west as he had thought and so steered west-north-west. Because of bad weather and strong currents, and despite having kept a good lookout with soundings, she struck a reef of rocks during the night. Dawn found her on a ridge running north–south and about three miles from Padro Kay near the Jardines (Cuba).

Despite their best efforts, the crew was unable to save Barracouta as the waves pounded her onto the rocks, causing flooding. The crew cut away her masts and abandoned her. All her crew were saved and they spent several days on nearby keys salvaging stores until she broke up.

They then set sail in two boats, one of which they had previously taken from the Spanish. They then came across a Spanish schooner that they captured. Two privateers that had set out from Trinidad, Cuba to find them captured them in turn. The crew were made prisoners of war; one, a sub-lieutenant, died during captivity.
