= HMS Herring (1804) =

History

United Kingdom
- Name: HMS Herring
- Ordered: 23 June 1803
- Builder: Goodrich & Co. (prime contractor), Bermuda
- Laid down: 1803
- Launched: 1804
- Fate: Lost, presumed foundered, July 1813

General characteristics
- Type: Ballahoo-class schooner
- Tons burthen: 7041/94 (bm)
- Length: 55 ft 2 in (16.8 m) (overall); 40 ft 10 1/2 in (12.5 m) (keel)
- Beam: 18 ft 0 in (5.5 m)
- Depth of hold: 9 ft 0 in (2.7 m)
- Sail plan: Schooner
- Complement: 20
- Armament: 4 × 12-pounder carronades

HMS Herring was a Royal Navy Ballahoo-class schooner of four 12-pounder carronades and a crew of 20. The prime contractor for the vessel was Goodrich & Co., in Bermuda, and she was launched in 1804. She spent most of her career in North American waters though she did spend two years sailing between Britain and Spain before returning to North America where she foundered in 1813.

== Service ==
She was commissioned under Lieutenant Isaac Morrison for the Leeward Islands or Newfoundland, and in fact served on the Newfoundland Station. In 1804 she was temporarily under Lieutenant John G. M'B. McKillop. He wrote the following letter:

His Maj. Schooner Herring, Bermuda October 1804

Sir,

I have the honor to acquaint your excellency that since my letter of the19 ..... the Herring and Pilchard have been launched, the former coppered and the inside work nearly compleat, the latter not yet coppered. The ship with spars for the several vessels arrived the day before yesterday which will enable the above vessels to be completed and ready for sea by the last of this month. The Capelin and Mackeral will not be launched until the middle of next month and I fear will not be ready to proceed to Newfoundland this winter. There being no iron ballast sent out for the schooners is of great inconvenience and the Navy Board have positively forbid any being purchased. The schooners being very buoyant obliges us to fill the hold with stone and carry all the water and provisions between decks so that the men have very little room. They are fine vessels of the kind and have the appearance of fast sailors. I beg leave to observe to your excellency that there being no establishment for the supply of necessaries, we are supplying them on the most reasonable terms possible and mean to forward the vouchers to the victualling board. The Officers and men are all in perfect health. I have the honor to remain &&&

John McKillop Lieut.

To: His Excellency Sir Erasmus Gower.

In 1805 Herring was again under the command of Morrison, on the Newfoundland station. Between 1806 and 1809, she was under the command of Morrison, then McKillop, and then by 1807 Lieutenant Walter J. Sprott. In 1808 she was under the command of Samuel W. Sprott, and in that year and the next she sailed twice for the Bay of Exploits in two unsuccessful attempts to make contact with the Beothuk people.

Herring then came under the command of Lieutenant Strong, who sailed her for Portugal on 5 March 1810. Herring underwent repairs at Portsmouth from 2 November until 16 January 1811. She spent that year and early 1812 sailing between Lisbon or Cadiz and Falmouth.

In 1812 Lieutenant John Murray took command, sailing her for North America on 3 July. On 15 February 1813 the American schooner Rachel arrived at Portsmouth. She was a prize to Herring.

== Fate ==
Herring was lost in July 1813, presumed foundered with all hands while on the Halifax station. As a result of an administrative error Herring remained on the Navy List until 7 December 1817.
