= HMS Chub (1807) =

History

United Kingdom
- Name: HMS Chub
- Ordered: 11 December 1805
- Builder: Goodrich & Co. (prime contractor), Bermuda
- Laid down: 1806
- Launched: May 1807
- Fate: Wrecked 14 August 1812

General characteristics
- Type: Ballahoo-class schooner
- Tons burthen: 7041/94 (bm)
- Length: 55 ft 2 in (16.8 m) (overall); 40 ft 10 1/2 in (12.5 m) (keel)
- Beam: 18 ft 0 in (5.5 m)
- Depth of hold: 9 ft 0 in (2.7 m)
- Sail plan: Schooner
- Complement: 20
- Armament: 4 × 12-pounder carronades

HMS Chub (or Chubb) was a British Royal Navy Ballahoo-class schooner of four 12-pounder carronades and a crew of 20. The prime contractor for the vessel was Goodrich & Co., in Bermuda, and she was launched in 1807. She and her crew were lost when she was wrecked in August 1812.

== Service ==
Chub was commissioned in March 1807 under Lieutenant Wentworth Parsons Croke. Chub may have assisted at the invasion of Martinique between January and February 1809. If so, she does not appear among the vessels whose crews qualified for the Naval General Service Medal when the Admiralty awarded it in 1847.

Lieutenant William Innes replaced Croke in June 1809 (who went on to command the schooner Shamrock), and was in turn replaced by Lieutenant Samuel Nisbett in 1812.

On 5 March 1812 Chub left Bermuda to search for Mary, Wilson, master, which had been sailing from Tobago to London. Admiral Sawyer had received information that Mary was in great distress from leaks and trying to reach Bermuda. Chub returned two days later without having found Mary. By 8 April Mary had still not arrived at Bermuda and it was feared that she had foundered.

Chub captured several vessels in 1812 while on the Halifax station. On 18 July she captured the privateer Eliza and on 6 August the merchantman Grace. Then on 18 July she recaptured Ann, M'Donald, master, which had been sailing from Cadiz to St John's when the American privateer Teazer captured her the day before. Chub brought Ann into Liverpool.

On 12 August, at dusk, Chub came under friendly fire from HMS Emulous, which mistook Chubb for an American privateer. Chubb had earlier stopped at Liverpool, Nova Scotia and taken on board some volunteers who wanted to go a cruise with her. A chain-shot from Emulous killed two of these volunteers, Ebenezer Herrington (or Harrington), and John Scott. Herrington was buried in the Old Burying Ground in Halifax. Chubb returned the surviving volunteers to Liverpool and resumed her cruise.

== Fate ==
Chub was driven ashore on 14 August on the "Sisters" (Black Rocks) within two miles of the Sambro Island Light near Halifax, Nova Scotia. Nisbett and all on board perished. She was stationed with the blockade of the American fleet at the time of sinking.
