= HMS Mullett (1807) =

History

United Kingdom
- Name: HMS Mullett
- Ordered: 11 December 1805
- Builder: Goodrich & Co. (prime contractor), Bermuda
- Laid down: 1806
- Launched: May 1807
- Fate: Sold 15 December 1814

General characteristics
- Type: Ballahoo-class schooner
- Tons burthen: 70 41/94 (bm)
- Length: 55 ft 2 in (16.8 m) (overall); 40 ft 10 1/2 in (12.5 m) (keel)
- Beam: 18 ft 0 in (5.5 m)
- Depth of hold: 9 ft 0 in (2.7 m)
- Sail plan: Schooner
- Complement: 20
- Armament: 4 × 12-pounder carronades

HMS Mullett was a Royal Navy Ballahoo-class schooner of four 12-pounder carronades and a crew of 20. The prime contractor for the vessel was Goodrich & Co., in Bermuda, and she was launched in 1807. Mullett had an apparently useful and completely uneventful career until she was sold at the end of 1814.

== Service ==
She was commissioned under Lieutenant Martin Guise for Halifax and the West Indies. In 1808 Lieutenant Abraham Brown assumed command. On 22 February 1808 she captured the American ship Thames. At the same time she also detained the American brig Columbia, which resulted in the incurring of some expenses that were deducted from the prize money. (Note: A first-class share of the prize money was worth £293 14s 6d; a fifth-class share, i.e., the share of a seaman, was worth £10 17s 7d.)

On 7 April Mullet encountered a squadron of six French ships of the line at 31°0′N 69°0′W, steering WNW. Mullett shadowed them for three hours. At the time it was believed that they were the vessels that had left Rochefort on 17 January.

In 1809 Lieutenant Robert Standly replaced Brown. In May 1810 she was in home waters under Lieutenant John Geary. Between September and October she was under repair at Plymouth. Between 9 and 11 November Geary faced a court martial. The charges were that he had not done his utmost to execute the orders of Sir Robert Calder in proceeding with the mails for Surinam, Berbice and Demerara. Instead, he had twice returned to port. He argued in his defence that his crew had been too sickly for him to proceed. The court's sentence was that he be severely reprimanded. (Note: In 1818 Geary, now first lieutenant of Phaeton, would again face a court martial. This time the charge would be that he had hidden two deserters from a British Army band on board Phaeton. He would again be severely reprimanded, and this time dismissed from his ship.) In 1810, Mullett was distressed and another vessel took out the Suriname mails.{{sfnp}Pawlyn|2003|p=104}}

In 1811 she was under Lieutenant Hugh Andersen in the Channel, and then in the next year under Lieutenant Thomas Evans surveying the Irish Sea. In 1813 she was under Lieutenant John Neale and then in 1814 under Lieutenant Josiah Thompson, who sailed her on the North Coast of Spain.

== Fate ==
She was sold at Plymouth for £390 on 15 December 1814.

== Post script ==
In January 1819, the London Gazette reported that Parliament had voted a grant to all those who had served under the command of Lord Viscount Keith in 1812, between 1812 and 1814, and in the Gironde. Mullet was listed among the vessels that had served under Keith in 1813 and 1814. (Note: The money was paid in three tranches. For someone participating in the first through third tranches, a first-class share was worth £256 5s 9d; a sixth-class share was worth £4 6s 10d. For someone participating only in the second and third tranches a first-class share was worth £202 6s 8d; a sixth-class share was worth £5 0s 5d.)
