= Dover (1807 ship) =

History

United Kingdom
- Name: Dover
- Namesake: Dover
- Launched: 1807, France
- Acquired: 1807 by purchase of a prize
- Captured: 24 June 1814 and burnt

General characteristics
- Tons burthen: 189 (bm)

Dover was a French vessel launched in 1807 under another name and taken in prize that year. She sailed between Britain and North America until 1814 when a United States privateer captured and burnt her.

== Career ==
Dover first appeared in Lloyd's Register (LR) in 1807.

Year	Master	Owner	Trade	Source
1807	Bloomfield	Keaton & Co.	Portsmouth–Liverpool	LR
1810	Blomfield; J.Tullock	Keaton & Co.	Liverpool–Newfoundland	LR
1812	J.Tullock; J.Ady	Captain & Co.	Liverpool–Newfoundland; Portsmouth–New Brunswick	LR

On 15 October 1812 Dover, Adey, master, had to put back into Liverpool leaky. She had been sailing from Liverpool to Newfoundland when she was driven onshore on the coast of Ireland. She had to throw part of her cargo overboard.

Year	Master	Owner	Trade	Source
1814	J.Adey (or Ady)	Laats & Co.	Portsmouth–Newfoundland; London–Lisbon	LR

== Fate ==
On 24 June 1814 the U.S. privateer Rattlesnake captured "the Wasp, Dorey, of Guernsey; and the Dover, of London, laden with Grain, bound to Lisbon". Rattlesnake burnt both vessels.

HMS Hyperion captured Rattlesnake two days later.
