= HMS Shamrock (1808) =

History

United Kingdom
- Name: HMS Shamrock
- Namesake: The Shamrock
- Ordered: February 1808
- Builder: Bermuda
- Laid down: 1808
- Launched: 15 September 1808
- Fate: Wrecked 23 February 1811

General characteristics (Note: All measurements are per design, not "as built".)
- Type: Shamrock-class schooner
- Tons burthen: 15032/94 (bm)
- Length: Overall:78 ft 8 in (24.0 m); Keel:60 ft 8 1/8 in (18.5 m)
- Beam: 21 ft 7 in (6.6 m)
- Depth of hold: 7 ft 10 in (2.4 m)
- Sail plan: Schooner
- Complement: 50
- Armament: 8 × 12-pounder carronades + 6 × 6-pounder chase guns

HMS Shamrock was a schooner built at Bermuda in 1808 of Bermuda cedar. She was built for the Royal Navy and was the name-ship of her class of 10-gun schooners. She was wrecked in 1811.

== Career ==
Sahmrock was commissioned under Lieutenant Abraham Bowen in 1808. There was a report that she had been lost on a passage from Halifax, Nova Scotia, to Barbados, and some official mentions to that effect, but these are clearly in error.

In 1809 Lieutenant Wentworth Parsons Croke replaced Bowen. Between 22 December 1810 and 16 January 1811 Shamrock underwent repairs at Portsmouth. She then departed carrying dispatches for Lisbon.

== Loss ==
Lloyd's List initially reported on 2 April 1811 that "HM schooner Shamrock" had been lost off Cape St Mary's, and that her crew had been saved.

Lieutenant Croke was cruising south east of Cape St Vincent when Shamrock pursued two merchant vessels that she did not catch. She then turned north to regain her station. At 10:30 pm on 23 February 1811 she ran aground, which came as a considerable shock as Croke had thought himself well-clear of land. It proved impossible to get her off and as waves poured over her and she filled with water he had Shamrock's masts cut away. They fell towards shore and the crew used them to scramble to safety. Still, two men died in the wreck. When the sun rose, Croke was able to see that Shamrock was about one and a half miles south of Cabo de Santa Maria. The location was approximately 36°55′N 7°48′W.

The subsequent court-martial admonished Croke to be more careful in the future. The causes of the loss were a miscalculation in navigation and strong currents that had put Shamrock much further north than he had realized, but Croke had failed to take necessary precautions when approaching land.
