= Rosina (1807 ship) =

History

United Kingdom
- Name: Rosina
- Launched: 1807, Norway
- Fate: Wrecked November 1810

General characteristics
- Tons burthen: 110, or 111 (bm)
- Sail plan: Schooner

Rosina was launched in Norway in 1807. She was wrecked in November 1810.

== Career ==
Rosina first appeared in Lloyd's Register in 1808.

Year	Master	Owner	Trade	Source
1808	Storey	C.Balteel	Dartmouth–Plymouth	LR

On 3 September 1808, Rosina, Brodig, master, arrived at Gothenburg from Plymouth. Then on 10 November she was on shore near Whitstable as she was sailing for Plymouth with a load of timber. She had struck on a sandbank but boats had pulled her off. On 21 July, she resumed her voyage to Plymouth. As she was not taking on much water it was believed that she had not suffered material damage. On 1 December, she arrived at Weymouth on her way from Gothenburg to Plymouth, together with some other vessels that had lost their cables and anchors in the Downs.

Year	Master	Owner	Trade	Source
1809	J.O.Brodig; N.Maddack; Samuelson	Bulteel & Co. Mullion & Co.	Plymouth–Wales; Liverpool–Prince Edward's Island	LR
1810	Sermellson	Mullion & Co.	Liverpool–Prince Edward Island	Register of Shipping

== Fate ==
Rosina, Samuelson, master, from North America, was driven ashore at Ballyrattan Bay, near Cork, on 27 November 1810, and was expected to go to pieces.

== Postscript ==
Rosina, ID:W08818, appears in an inventory of shipwrecks at Ballycotton conducted by Mizen Archeology in 2021.
