= Duchess of York (1807 ship) =

History

United Kingdom
- Name: Duchess of York
- Builder: Spain
- Acquired: 1807
- Captured: 1807

General characteristics
- Tons burthen: 100 (bm)
- Armament: 10 × 4-pounder guns

Duchess of York was a Spanish prize that started on a voyage as a slave ship. She was cut off on the coast of Africa in 1807 on her first slave trading voyage and disappears.

She first appeared in Lloyd's Register (LR) in 1807.

Year	Master	Owner	Trade	Source
1807	Jn.Davis	Critchley	Liverpool–Africa	LR

Captain John Davis sailed from Liverpool on 22 March 1807. (She sailed before 1 May, the day on which the Slave Trade Act 1807 took effect, banning British vessels from participating in the slave trade.) She is believed to have gathered slaves on the coast between Rio Nuñez and the Assini River. At the end of December, Lloyd's List reported that Duchess of York, Davis, master, had been cut off on the coast of Africa. The next report was that Duchess of York, Davis, master, was stranded onshore at Baffoe Bay (possibly Boffa 10.18°N 14.04°W).

Reportedly, Duchess of York was attacked from the shore. She did not reach the Americas and her slaves apparently stayed in Africa.

The final disposition of Duchess of York, her captain, and crew is obscure. Both LR and the Register of Shipping continued to list her for several more years, but with stale data. An article on captains of slave ships makes no mention of her loss. An article on losses of slave ships has no information beyond that in the LL report.

In 1807, a short year because of the end of British participation in the trans-Atlantic slave trade, 12 British slave ships were lost, seven of them on the coast of Africa. During the period 1793 to 1807, war, rather than maritime hazards or resistance by the captives, was the greatest cause of vessel losses among British slave vessels.
