= HMS Tang =

History

United Kingdom
- Name: HMS Tang
- Ordered: 11 December 1805
- Builder: Goodrich & Co. (prime contractor), Bermuda
- Laid down: 1806
- Launched: May 1807
- Fate: Lost, presumed foundered, February 1808

General characteristics
- Type: Ballahoo-class schooner
- Tons burthen: 70 41/94 (bm)
- Length: 55 ft 2 in (16.8 m) (overall); 40 ft 10 1/2 in (12.5 m) (keel)
- Beam: 18 ft 0 in (5.5 m)
- Depth of hold: 9 ft 0 in (2.7 m)
- Sail plan: Schooner
- Complement: 20
- Armament: 4 × 12-pounder carronades

HMS Tang was a Royal Navy Ballahoo-class schooner of four 12-pounder carronades and a crew of 20. The prime contractor for the vessel was Goodrich & Co., in Bermuda, and she was launched in 1807. Like many of her class and the related Cuckoo-class schooners, she succumbed to the perils of the sea relatively early in her career.

== Service ==
Tang was commissioned in 1807 under Lieutenant George Senhouse. In 1808 Lieutenant Joseph Derby took command.

== Fate ==
Tang was lost with all hands in February 1808 in the North Atlantic while sailing from Bermuda to Britain. Reports indicate that she had 25 people aboard, suggesting that she may also have been carrying some passengers.
