= Tartar (1811 ship) =

History

United Kingdom
- Builder: France
- Launched: 1807
- Acquired: Circa 1811 by purchase of a prize
- Fate: Foundered January 1814; no trace

General characteristics
- Tons burthen: 121 (bm)
- Armament: 6 × 6-pounder carronades

Tartar was launched in France in 1807, almost surely under another name. She was captured circa 1811 and traded to Brazil, first from Liverpool and then from Falmouth, Cornwall. She disappeared without a trace in January 1814.

== Career ==
Tartar first appeared in Lloyd's Register (LR), in 1811.

Year	Master	Owner	Trade	Source
1811	K.C.Hill	Koster & Co.	Liverpool–Brazils	LR
1813	K.C.Hill; J.West	Nicholoson; Geddes	Falmouth–Brazil	LR

== Fate ==
On 4 February 1814 Tartar, West, master, was reported to have arrived at St Michaels from Spain. Around 2 January 1814 she sailed from St Michaels for London and was never heard from again.
