= HMS Cuttle (1807) =

History

United Kingdom
- Name: HMS Cuttle
- Ordered: 11 December 1805
- Builder: Goodrich & Co. (prime contractor), Bermuda
- Laid down: 1806
- Launched: May 1807
- Honours and awards: Naval General Service Medal with clasp "Martinique"
- Fate: Broken up 1814 or wrecked 1814

General characteristics
- Type: Ballahoo-class schooner
- Tons burthen: 70 41/94 (bm)
- Length: 55 ft 2 in (16.8 m) (overall); 40 ft 10 1/2 in (12.5 m) (keel)
- Beam: 18 ft 0 in (5.5 m)
- Depth of hold: 9 ft 0 in (2.7 m)
- Sail plan: Schooner
- Complement: 20
- Armament: 4 × 12-pounder carronades

HMS Cuttle was a Royal Navy Ballahoo-class schooner of four 12-pounder carronades and a crew of 20. The prime contractor for the vessel was Goodrich & Co., in Bermuda, and she was launched in 1807. She was broken up in 1814.

== Service ==
She was commissioned in 1807 under Lieutenant Thomas Bury for the Halifax station. Between 28 September and 16 October she was in Portsmouth, refitting.

In October 1808, Lieutenant George Jackson took command. One of his first assignments was to sail to Boston to await the American president's response to the Chesapeake-Leopard Affair.

Cuttle was at the capture of Martinique in early 1809. In 1847 the Admiralty authorized the issuance of the Naval General Service Medal with clasp "Martinique" to all remaining survivors of the campaign that claimed it. Jackson left Cuttle after Martinique.

In late 1809 Cuttle was again at Halifax. Around early November she captured the Three Sisters, which the pirate Edward Jordan had owned but stolen, after killing the crew, to prevent foreclosure. He was convicted of piracy and executed in Halifax, Nova Scotia. His body was covered in tar and hanged from chains in a gibbet at Point Pleasant as a warning to others. His gibbet joined three others across the harbour on McNabs Island who had been executed for mutiny aboard the Cruizer-class brig-sloop HMS Columbine in the same year.

In 1810 Cuttle was under the command of Lieutenant Michael Molloy, off North America. In June 1811 she was under Lieutenant William L. Patterson, who in 1812 was with her in Portsmouth. On 24 July 1812 she captured the American vessel Laura. Cuttle was then under a Lieutenant Saunders. The Mary, which Cuttle had detained as she was sailing from Rio de Janeiro to New York, came into Bermuda on 15 August. In 1813 Cuttle was under Lieutenant John T. Young.

== Fate ==
Cuttle was decommissioned and laid up at Bermuda on 29 March. She was broken up in 1814. Still, several reports erroneously have her foundering with all hands off Halifax in December 1814.
