= Mainwaring (1807 ship) =

Schooner launched in Ipswich

History

United Kingdom
- Name: Mainwaring
- Namesake: William Mainwaring (1737-1812) was a merchant and Governor of the Hudson's Bay Company
- Operator: Hudson's Bay Company
- Builder: Ipswich
- Launched: 1807
- Fate: Condemned 1820 and broken up

General characteristics
- Tons burthen: 80 (bm)
- Sail plan: Schooner

Mainwaring was a schooner launched in Ipswich in 1807. The Hudson's Bay Company (HBC) acquired her and she spent the rest of her career sailing for the HBC until she was broken up in 1820.

Mainwaring first appeared in the registers in the Register of Shipping (RS) in 1809 with Davidson, master, Hudson's Bay Company, owner, and trade London–Hudson Bay. By then Captain John Davidson (or Davison), had sailed her to York Factory. From 1808 until she was broken up she operated out of Moose Factory; her main function was to supply Fort Severn, a Hudson's Bay Company post at the mouth of the Severn River in northern Ontario, though she visited other posts around the bay as well.

In 1815, Mainwaring was decommissioned after the HBC vessels had become ice-bound in Hudson Bay.

In 1820 she was found unseaworthy and was broken up.

In 1821 a ship of 60 tons was built at Moose Factory from materials salvaged from Mainwaring.
