= Lord Melville (1807 ship) =

United Kingdom
- Name: Lord Melville
- Owner: Campbell, Sen and Co., Glasgow
- Launched: 1807, Quebec
- Fate: Burned and exploded 1 April 1809

General characteristics –
- Tons burthen: 371, or 372 (bm)
- Armament: 2 × 9-pounder guns

Lord Melville was launched at Quebec in 1807. She was re-registered at London on 4 March 1808. She entered Lloyd's Register (LR) in 1808.

| Year | Master | Owner | Trade | Source |
|---|---|---|---|---|
| 1808 | S.Cameron | Gilespie | London | LR |
| 1809 | Cameron; T.Brown | Campbell | London−Saint Vincent. | LR |

Lord Melville, Brown, master, was sailing from Saint Vincent to Glasgow when a fire and explosion destroyed her on 1 April 1809 in the Atlantic Ocean at 55°07′N 26°36′W. The boatswain had gone to the spirits room with a lighted candle that ignited the fumes and started the fire. He died in the incident. The remaining 26 people on board took to her boats and were able to leave before she blew up.

Register of Shipping for 1809 carried the annotation "Burnt" by her name.
