= Ballahoo-class schooner =

Type of historical British naval vessel

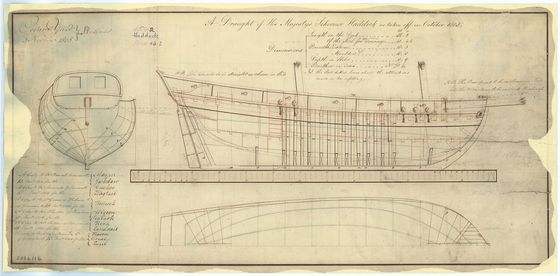
- A plan showing body plan with stern board outline, sheer lines with inboard detail, and longitudinal half-breadth of HMS Haddock of the Ballahoo class, as taken off in October 1805 and modified on her refit. National Maritime Museum, Greenwich

Class overview
- Name: Ballahoo (or Fish) class
- Operators: Royal Navy
- Succeeded by: Cuckoo (or Bird) class
- Planned: 18
- Completed: 18
- Lost: 12

General characteristics
- Tons burthen: 70 41/94 (bm)
- Length: Overall: 55 ft 2 in (16.8 m); Keel: 40 ft 10 1/2 in (12.5 m)
- Beam: 18 ft 0 in (5.5 m)
- Depth of hold: 9 ft 0 in (2.7 m)
- Sail plan: Schooner
- Complement: 20
- Armament: 4 × 12-pounder carronades (Pierced for 10)

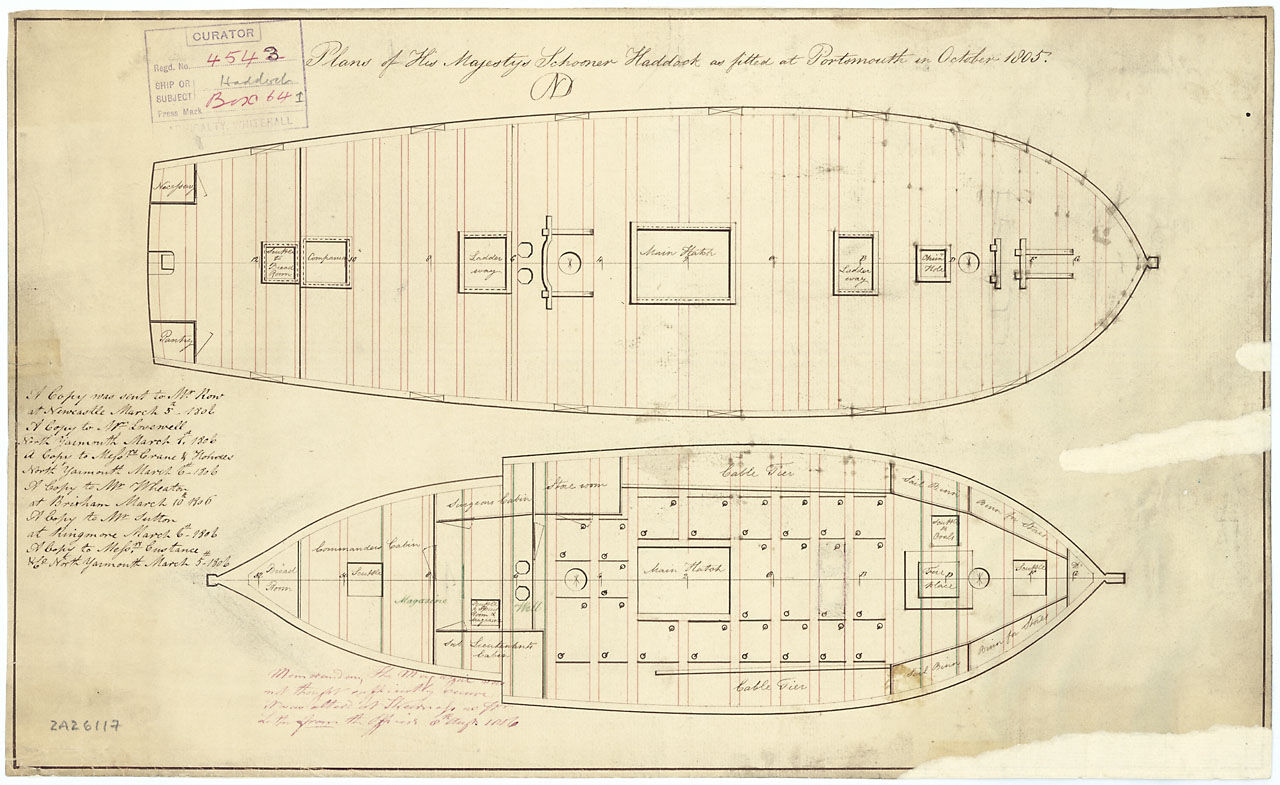
Plan of HMS Haddock, c. October 1805

The Ballahoo class (also known as the Fish class) was a Royal Navy class of eighteen 4-gun schooners built under contract in Bermuda during the Napoleonic War. The class was an attempt by the Admiralty to harness the expertise of Bermudian shipbuilders who were renowned for their fast-sailing craft (particularly the Bermuda sloops). The Admiralty ordered twelve vessels on 23 June 1804, and a further six on 11 December 1805.

== Construction ==
A number of different builders in different yards built them, with all the first batch launching in 1804 and 1805. The second batch were all launched in 1807. Goodrich & Co acted as the main contractor to the Navy Board, and in many cases the actual builder is unrecorded. They were all constructed of Bermuda cedar.

This durable, native wood, abundant in Bermuda before the Blight, was strong and light, and did not need seasoning. Shipbuilders used it for framing as well as planking, which reduced vessel weight. It was also highly resistant to rot and marine borers, giving Bermudian vessels a potential lifespan of twenty years and more, even in the worm-infested waters of the Chesapeake and the Caribbean.

== Operational lives ==
Of the eighteen vessels in the class, only two were not lost or disposed of during the war, surviving to be sold in 1815–1816. Twelve were wartime losses, and four were disposed of before 1815.

William James wrote scathingly of the Ballahoo and subsequent Cuckoo-class schooners, pointing out the high rate of loss, primarily to wrecks or foundering, but also to enemy action. He reports that they were "sent to 'take, burn, and destroy' the vessels of war and merchantmen of the enemy". The record suggests that none seem to have done so successfully. In the only two (arguably three) cases when the Cuckoo-class schooners did engage enemy vessels, in each case the enemy force was much stronger and overwhelmed the Cuckoo-class schooners.

James also remarks that:

Their very appearance as "men of war" raised a laugh at the expense of the projector. Many officers refused to take the command of them. Others gave a decided preference to some vessels built at the same yard, to be employed as water-tanks at Jamaica. Moreover, when sent forth to cruise against the enemies of England...these "king's schooners" were found to sail wretchedly, and proved so crank and unseaworthy, that almost every one of them that escaped capture went to the bottom with the unfortunate men on board.

== Ships ==
=== Orders of 23 June 1803 ===
The first twelve were intended for three different stations:

- Newfoundland: Herring, Mackerel, Pilchard, and Capelin
- Jamaica:- Barracuta, Whiting, Pike, and Haddock
- Leeward Islands: Flying Fish, Ballahou, Grouper, and Snapper.

| Name | Builder | Begun | Launched | Completed | Fate |
|---|---|---|---|---|---|
| Ballahoo | Bermuda | 1803 | 1804 | 1804 | Captured by American privateer off South Carolina 29 April 1814 |
| Barracouta | Bermuda | 1803 | 1804 | 1804 | Wrecked on Padro Keys, near the Jardines (Cuba), on 3 October 1805; crew saved but captured. |
| Capelin | Bermuda | 1803 | 1804 | 1804 | Wrecked on Parquette Rock off Brest on 28 June 1808; crew saved by ships in company. |
| Flying Fish (or sometimes Kingfish) | Bermuda | 1803 | 1804 | 1804 | |
| Grouper | Bermuda | 1803 | 1804 | 1804 | Wrecked on a reef off Guadeloupe 21 October 1811; crew saved. |
| Haddock | Bermuda | 1803 | 1805 | 1805 | Taken by French 18-gun Génie in the Atlantic 30 January 1809. |
| Herring | Bermuda | 1803 | 1804 | 1804 | Lost, presumably foundered with all hands, off Halifax in July 1813. |
| Mackerel | Bermuda | 1803 | 1804 | 1804 | Sold at Plymouth for £400 on 14 December 1815. |
| Pike | Bermuda | 1803 | 1804 | 1804 | Taken and retaken; ultimate fate is unclear. |
| Pilchard | Bermuda | 1803 | 1805 | 1806 | Sold at Sheerness 23 February 1813. |
| Snapper | Bermuda | 1803 | 1805 | 1806 | Taken by French lugger Repace off Sables d'Olonne |
| Whiting | Bermuda | 1803 | 1805 | 1806 | Taken, released, and taken by 18-gun privateer Diligent 22 August 1812. |

=== Orders of 11 December 1805 ===
| Name | Builder | Begun | Launched | Completed | Fate |
|---|---|---|---|---|---|
| Bream | Bermuda | 1806 | 1807 | 1807 | Sold or broken up 1816. |
| Chub | Bermuda | 1806 | 1807 | 1807 | Driven ashore and lost with all hands near Halifax, Nova Scotia, 14 August 1812. |
| Cuttle | Bermuda | 1806 | 1807 | 1807 | Broken up 1814. |
| Porgey | Bermuda | 1806 | 1807 | 1807 | Grounded in the Scheldt Estuary and burnt to avoid capture. |
| Mullett | Bermuda | 1806 | 1807 | 1807 | Sold at Plymouth for £300 on 15 December 1814. |
| Tang | Bermuda | 1806 | 1807 | 1807 | Lost, presumed foundered with all hands, in North Atlantic February 1808. |
