= Express Packet (1808 ship) =

History

United Kingdom
- Name: Express Packet
- Launched: 1807
- Acquired: circa 1808
- Fate: Last mentioned in 1817

General characteristics
- Tons burthen: 208 (bm)
- Armament: 12 × 9-pounder guns

Express Packet (or Express) was built in France in 1807, probably under another name, and taken in prize circa 1808. From 1809 she sailed as a packet for the Post Office Packet Service out of Falmouth, Cornwall. In 1812 an American privateer captured her in a notable single ship action, but then returned her to her captain and crew after plundering her. Express stopped sailing as a packet in 1817 and then made one more voyage to Spain, after which she disappeared from online records.

== Career ==
Captain John Bullock assumed command of Express Packet on 3 December 1808, and she started sailing for the packet service in 1809.

Two French privateers captured Jacob, of Philadelphia, Jellig, master, as she was sailing from Cadiz and Gibraltar. On 30 June 1810 Express Packet recaptured Jacob and carried her into Gibraltar.

On 23 March 1811, 13/16ths of Express Packet were offered for sale. Four days earlier, she had arrived at Falmouth from Jamaica with 560,000 dollars.

Captain John Watkins assumed command of Express Packet on 4 February 1812.

Captain John Quick assumed command of Express Packet on 31 December 1812.

On 23 March 1813, Express Packet, John Quick, master, left Rio de Janeiro, bound for Falmouth. She had a crew of 32 men and boys. On 14 April she encountered the American privateer Anaconda at 6°26′S 29°8′W. Anaconda was armed with 18 guns and had a crew of 120 men. The ensuing action lasted for an hour and a half before Captain Quick felt he had to strike. Express Packet had suffered no casualties, but four guns had been dismounted, her rigging was cut to pieces, and holes between wind and water had resulted in her having taken on 3½ feet of water with more coming in. The Americans plundered Express Packet of all her stores and threw her guns overboard. They also took out £10,000 or £12,000 in gold bullion. The Americans restored the passengers' private property and gave Express Packet back to Quick and his crew.

U.S. sources reported that the bullion was worth $80,000. A later report stated that Express Packet had been armed with 12 guns and had had a crew of 38 men. She had engaged for 18 minutes before striking.

Express Packet arrived back at Falmouth on 19 May 1813. She had sunk her mails before she was captured. (Note: Contemporary newspaper accounts of the capture gave her captor's name variously as Anna Corda, Annacenda, and Anaconda.) The Captains' Enquiry into the action praised Captain Quick for his conduct. The damage to Express reduced her valuation from £3071 to £2270 12s. Quick received 1/12th of that as salvage. The repairs took over two months to complete and cost £2341 14s 9d.

Express Packet then returned to mercantile service.

== Fate ==
Express Packet was no longer listed among the "Falmouth Packets" in the Lloyd's Register volume for 1818. She was listed as Express among the regular merchant vessels, still with Quick as master and trade Falmouth. The last mention of Express, Quick, master in Lloyd's List's ship arrival and departure data showed her arriving in Corunna on 4 October 1817 from Falmouth.
