= Salisbury (1807 ship) =

History

United Kingdom
- Name: Salisbury
- Owner: Dodds
- Operator: Board of Transport
- Builder: Francis Hurry & Co, Howdon
- Launched: 1807
- Fate: Wrecked 10 November 1807

General characteristics
- Tons burthen: 324 (bm)
- Complement: 19
- Armament: 2 × 6-pounder guns + 8 × 18-pounder carronades

Salisbury was launched at Howdon in 1807. The Royal Navy′s Transport Board engaged her to support the British attack on Copenhagen in August–September 1807. She was wrecked while bringing troops back to England after the city's surrender.

Salisbury first entered Lloyd's Register (LR) in 1807 with N.Purdye, master, Dodds, owner, and trade London transport.

On 10 November 1807, Salisbury was wrecked on the Long Sand, in the North Sea off Deal, Kent, England, with the loss of over 240 lives. Lloyd's List gave the location as Kentish Knock and the name of her master as Purdy. Other records suggest that 60 of the 260 troops on board were saved; it is not clear how many of her crew, if any, survived.
