= Velilla =

Velilla, Spain
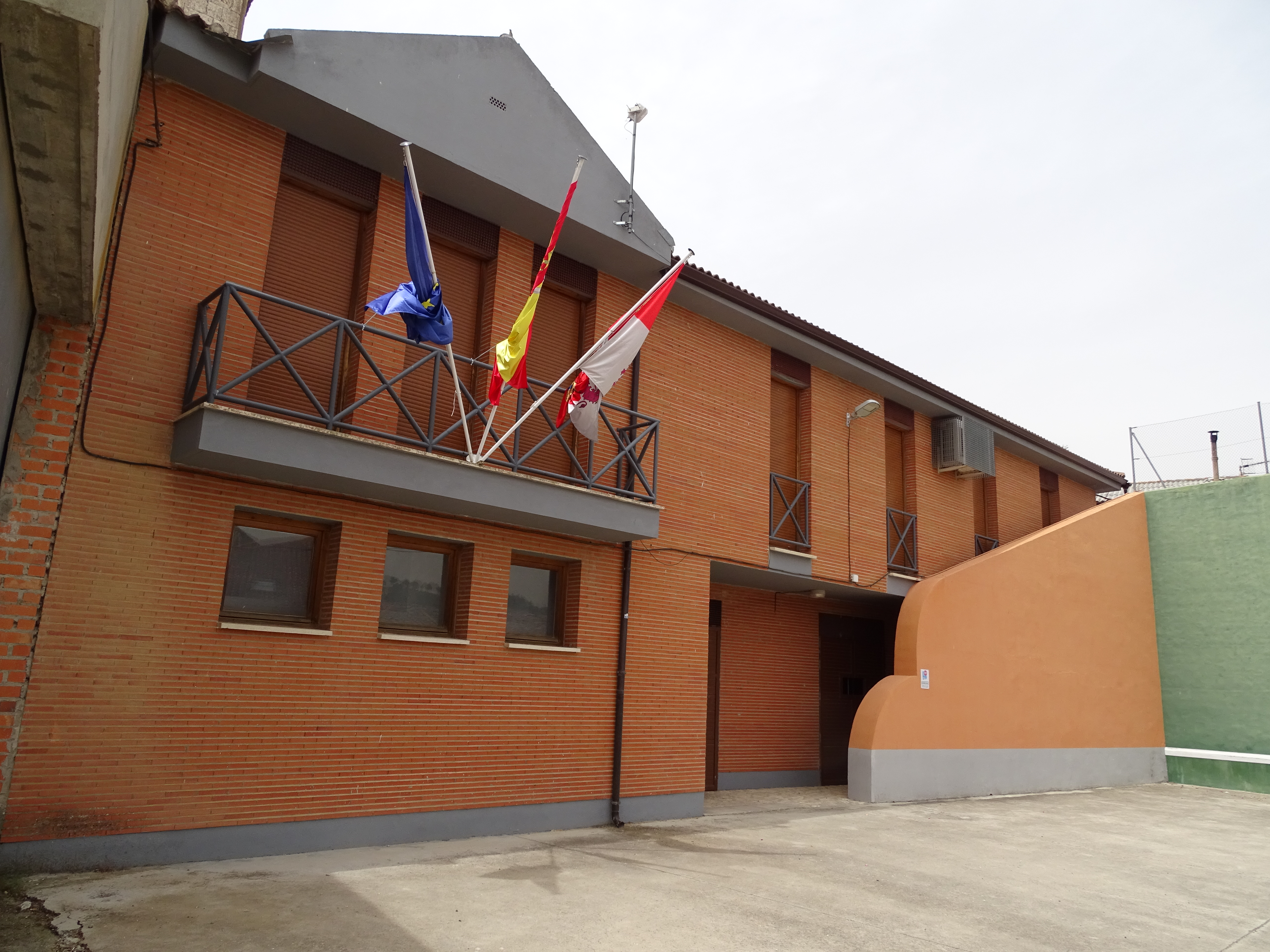
- Town hall

- Location in Spain
- Coordinates: 41.5583°N 5.0044°W
- Country: Spain
- Autonomous community: Castile and León
- Province: Valladolid
- Municipality: Velilla

Area
  - Total: 19 km^{2} (7.3 sq mi)

Population (2025-01-01)
  - Total: 109
  - Density: 5.7/km^{2} (15/sq mi)
- Time zone: UTC+1 (CET)
  - Summer (DST): UTC+2 (CEST)

Velilla is a municipality located in the province of Valladolid, Castile and León, Spain. According to the 2004 census (INE), the municipality has a population of 138 inhabitants.
