= Clarendon (1807 ship) =

History

United Kingdom
- Name: Clarendon
- Launched: 1807, Whitehaven
- Captured: January 1815

General characteristics
- Tons burthen: 485, or 507(bm)
- Complement: 37
- Armament: 1814:2 × 24-pounder + 16 × 9-pounder carronades; 1814:2 × 9-pounder guns + 12 × 24&9-pounder carronades

Clarendon was built in 1807 at Whitehaven. Between 1808 or so and 1813 she sailed as a West Indiaman between London and Jamaica. In 1814 she sailed for Batavia under a license from the British East India Company (EIC). The privateer Young Wasp captured Clarendon off the Cape of Good Hope (the Cape), on 6 January 1815, and she arrived at Baltimore on 15 April.

== Career ==
Clarendon first appeared in Lloyd's Register (LR) in the volume for 1808.

Year	Master	Owner	Trade	Source
1808	J.Hudgen	Still & Co.	Whitehaven–Cork	LR
1810	J.Hodgen; J.Scott	Still & Co.	London–Jamaica	LR

15 February 1813 Clarendon, Scott, master, was at Deal, preparing to sail for Jamaica. A gale came up that cost her her anchors. Other vessels at Deal were blown out to sea.

In 1813 the EIC lost its monopoly on the trade between India and Britain. British ships were then free to sail to India or the Indian Ocean under a license from the EIC.

Year	Master	Owner	Trade	Source
1814	J.Scott	Still & Co.	Liverpool–Jamaica; London–India	LR
1815	J.Scott	Mestaers	London–India	LR

On 1 March 1814 Captain Thomas Lynn acquired a letter of marque On 25 February Clarendon sailed for Batavia.

== Fate ==
On 8 January 1815 the United States privateer Young Wasp captured Clarendon of the Cape as Clarendon was returning to London from Batavia. Clarendon arrived at Baltimore on 15 April. There she was condemned in prize. She had on board 1,150,000 pounds of coffee, a quantity of "elephants teeth", "Japan wood", etc.

Young Wasp had a burthen of 418 tons, was armed with 20 guns, and had a crew of 150 men. American records describe Clarendon as carrying 24 guns and having a crew of 50 men, and being captured off the Cape of Good Hope.
