= French schooner Ortensia =

Ortensia
History

France
- Name: Ortensia
- Builder: Luigi Paresi, Venice
- Laid down: December 1806
- Launched: 1807
- Captured: July 1808

United Kingdom
- Name: HMS Ortenzia
- Acquired: July 1808 by capture
- Fate: Sold November 1812

General characteristics
- Class & type: Psiche-class schooner
- Displacement: 177 tons (French)
- Tons burthen: 172 (bm)
- Length: 27.61 m (90.6 ft) (overall)
- Beam: 6.82 m (22.4 ft)
- Sail plan: Schooner
- Complement: 62, but 56 at capture
- Armament: Originally: 10 × 6-pounder guns; At capture: 2 × 24-pounder guns + 6 × long 9-pounder guns + 2 × 3-pounder swivel guns; British service: 10 guns

The French schooner Ortensia (or Hortensia), launched at Venice in 1807, was the second of three Psiche-class schooners. All three served in Napoleon's Italian navy. After HMS Minstrel captured her at the Brionian Islands, the Royal Navy took Ortensia into service as HMS Ortenzia. The Navy sold her at Malta in 1812.

== Capture ==
On the morning of 16 July 1808, Captain John Hollinworth of Minstrel was off Veruda, when he observed a schooner anchor off "Paul's". As Minstrel approached, the crew of the schooner fired her guns at Minstrel and then ran schooner ashore "on one of the Bryone Islands", where they abandoned her. The schooner turned out to be the Italian schooner Ortenzia, pierced for 16 guns but carrying only ten. She had had a crew of 56 men under the command of lieutenant de fregate Stalamini. Hollingsworth opined that she would be useful in His Majesty's service as she was a "very fast sailing Vessel... Copper bottomed, nearly new". (Note: The Admiralty paid head money in May 1815 for the capture. A first-class share was worth £73 15s 6¼d; a sixth-class share, that of an ordinary seaman, was worth £1 5s 5¼d.)

== Royal Navy service ==
The Royal Navy commissioned her in 1809 under the command of Lieutenant Edward Blaquiere.

On 22 June 1810 Ortenzia was off the coast of Calabria. When Pilot, Commander John Toup Nicholas, arrived, Blaquiere informed Toup that a French convoy of 51 vessels were anchored off Cirella, a small town some 30 miles south of the Gulf of Policastro. The next day Pilot and Ortenzia came up under sweeps, the wind being calm, and observed that the convoy was under the escort of five settees and eight gunboats. Ortensia, assisted by boats from Pilot chased the convoy, firing on it. The British succeeded in causing five of the largest merchant vessels to run ashore north of the town and some of the others to seek refuge under a battery. However, the arrival of more escorts and the tiredness of the British sailors, who had been at the sweeps for nine hours, led Toup to call off the attack. In the evening Pilot's boats tried to destroy the vessels on the beach, but heavy small arms fire drove them off. Pilot and Ortenzia then destroyed the vessels with gunfire. British casualties included three men killed.

On 11 May 1811, Captain Henry Hope, of Topaze, and Blaquiere arrived at Tripoli and the next day met with Yūsūf Pāshā Qaramānlī and his council.

== Fate ==
The Navy sold her at Malta on 6 November 1812.
