= List of ships named Lord Cathcart =

Three vessels launched in 1807–1808 were named Lord Cathcart for William Cathcart, 1st Earl Cathcart. All three were ill-fated, being wrecked between 1820 and 1822. Before they wrecked, all three made a voyage to India c.1817. The British East India Company (EIC) in 1813 lost its monopoly on the Britain–India trade and thereafter private vessels sailed under an EIC license for their voyage.

- Lord Cathcart (1807 Hull ship), of 362 tons (bm), was a West Indiaman that made one voyage to India before she foundered 1820 after striking a rock at Pelagosa Island in the Adriatic Sea.
- Lord Cathcart (1807 Shields ship), of 490 or 491 tons (bm), between 1816 and 1919 traded with the Cape of Good Hope. She experienced two notable events, her detention in Chile in 1822 and her wrecking at Prince Edward Island in 1825.
- Lord Cathcart (1808 ship), of 44173/94 (bm) was launched on 12 October 1808 at Jarrow. Between 1815 and 1819 she traded with the East Indies and India. She was trading with Quebec when she foundered in 1821 in the Atlantic.
