= List of shipwrecks in June 1826 =

The list of shipwrecks in June 1826 includes some ships sunk, wrecked or otherwise lost during June 1826.

== 1 June ==
List of shipwrecks: 1 June 1826
Ship	State	Description
Ganges	United Kingdom	The ship ran aground in the Hooghly River at Fultah, India. She was on a voyage from London to Madras and Calcutta, India. Ganges was refloated on 3 June and taken in to Calcutta.
Windsor Castle	United Kingdom	The ship put into Mauritius leaking badly. There she was surveyed, condemned as a constructive total loss, and sold for breaking up. Prince Regent United Kingdom, Lamb, master, was engaged to take Windsor Castle's cargo.

== 2 June ==
List of shipwrecks: 2 June 1826
Ship	State	Description
Agamemnon	United Kingdom	The ship was wrecked on Cape Sable Island, Nova Scotia, British North America. Her crew survived.

== 3 June ==
List of shipwrecks: 3 June 1826
Ship	State	Description
Eagle	United Kingdom	The ship ran aground on the Falsterbo Reef, in the Baltic Sea. Her crew were rescued. She was on a voyage from Memel, Prussia to Bristol, Gloucestershire. Eagle was refloated in late June and taken in to Landskrona, Sweden for repairs.

== 4 June ==
List of shipwrecks: 4 June 1826
Ship	State	Description
Brothers	United Kingdom	The ship was wrecked on the Barrel Key. Her crew survived. She was on a voyage from London to New Orleans, Louisiana, United States.

== 6 June ==
List of shipwrecks: 6 June 1826
Ship	State	Description
Duke of Gloucester	(United Kingdom of Great Britain and Ireland) Cape Colony	The coastal schooner was driven ashore in Table Bay.
Nautilus	United Kingdom	The ship was lost in Table Bay. She was on a voyage from London to Mauritius.
William	(United Kingdom of Great Britain and Ireland) Cape Colony	The coastal schooner was driven ashore in Table Bay.

== 7 June ==
List of shipwrecks: 7 June 1826
Ship	State	Description
Enterprise	United Kingdom	The ship ran aground on the Dipper Ledge and was abandoned. She was on a voyage from the Clyde to Saint John, New Brunswick, British North America.

== 12 June ==
List of shipwrecks: 12 June 1826
Ship	State	Description
Nostra Señora de Aransain	Spain	The ship was captured and sunk off Cape Finisterre by a Colombian privateer. She was on a voyage from Passage West, County Cork, United Kingdom to Barcelona.

== 13 June ==
List of shipwrecks: 13 June 1826
Ship	State	Description
Providence	United Kingdom	The ship sprang a leak and sank off Ardrossan, Ayrshire. Her crew were rescued. She was on a voyage from Ayr to Dundalk, County Louth.

== 14 June ==
List of shipwrecks: 14 June 1826
Ship	State	Description
Ann	United Kingdom	The ship was wrecked off Dublin. She was on a voyage from Cardiff, Glamorgan to Dublin.

== 15 June ==
List of shipwrecks: 15 June 1826
Ship	State	Description
Indiana	United Kingdom	The ship was driven ashore at Saugor, India.
Pyotr (Пётр, 'Peter')	Imperial Russian Navy	The transport ship was holed by a submerged anchor and sank at the mouth of the ru:Tsarev, a distributary in the Volga Delta. She was subsequently refloated, repaired and returned to service.

== 16 June ==
List of shipwrecks: 16 June 1826
Ship	State	Description
Bombay Merchant	United Kingdom	The ship was lost in the Bengal River, India with the loss of 36 lives.

== 17 June ==
List of shipwrecks: 17 June 1826
Ship	State	Description
Europa	United Kingdom	The ship was lost near Tunis, Beylik of Tunis. At least three of her fifteen crew survived. She was on a voyage from Chioggia, Kingdom of Lombardy–Venetia to Plymouth, Devon.

== 20 June ==
List of shipwrecks: 20 June 1826
Ship	State	Description
Hope	United Kingdom	The ship was wrecked on the South Bishop Rock, in the Irish Sea off the coast of Pembrokeshire. Her crew were rescued. She was on a voyage from Swansea to Strangford, County Antrim.

== 22 June ==
List of shipwrecks: 22 June 1826
Ship	State	Description
Elizabeth & Ann	United Kingdom	The ship ran aground on the Amet Island Reef, British North America.

== 24 June ==
List of shipwrecks: 24 June 1826
Ship	State	Description
Prince of Wales	United Kingdom	The ship struck a rock and was damaged in the Sound of Hoy. She was on a voyage from Stromness, Orkney Islands to Hudson Bay. Prince of Wales subsequently put into Kirkcaldy, Fife for repairs.

== 26 June ==
List of shipwrecks: 26 June 1826
Ship	State	Description
Mary	United Kingdom	The ship was driven ashore at Communipaw, New Jersey.

== 28 June ==
List of shipwrecks: 28 June 1826
Ship	State	Description
Dexterity	United Kingdom	The whaler was lost in the Davis Strait. Her crew were rescued.

== 29 June ==
List of shipwrecks: 29 June 1826
Ship	State	Description
Jonge Frederick	Netherlands	The ship collided with a schooner in the English Channel and capsized with the loss of two of her crew. She was on a voyage from Bordeaux, Gironde, France to Brussels. Jonge Frederick was later taken in to Cadgwith, Cornwall, United Kingdom.

== 30 June ==
List of shipwrecks: 30 June 1826
Ship	State	Description
Auguste	France	The ship was wrecked near Bayonne, Basses-Pyrénées. Her crew were rescued. She was on a voyage from St. Thomas, Virgin Islands to St. Andero, Spain and Bordeaux, Gironde.
Sally	(United Kingdom of Great Britain and Ireland) New South Wales	The schooner was wrecked off Waterhouse Island with the loss of thirteen of the 23 people on board.

== Unknown date ==
List of shipwrecks: Unknown date in June 1826
Ship	State	Description
Calder	United Kingdom	The brig was wrecked at Valparaíso, Chile.
Sydney Packet	United Kingdom	The ship was wrecked on White Island, British North America.
