= List of shipwrecks in January 1820 =

The list of shipwrecks in January 1820 includes ships sunk, foundered, grounded, or otherwise lost during January 1820.

== 1 January ==
List of shipwrecks: 1 January 1820
Ship	State	Description
Marianna	Sweden	The ship was lost near Gothenburg with the loss of one life. She was on a voyage from Liebau, Prussia to London, United Kingdom.
Roseberry	United Kingdom	The ship struck the pier at Whitby, North Riding of Yorkshire and was severely damaged.

== 3 January ==
List of shipwrecks: 3 January 1820
Ship	State	Description
Albion	Sweden	The full-rigged ship was driven ashore at Mogadore, Morocco.
Assunta	Kingdom of Sardinia	The brig-schooner was driven ashore and wrecked at Mogadore.
Minerva	Kingdom of Sardinia	The bombard was driven ashore and wrecked at Mogadore.
Vine	United Kingdom	The ship struck Rock Patrick, off Strangford, County Down, and foundered. She was on a voyage from Beaumaris, Anglesey, to Berwick-upon-Tweed, Northumberland.

== 4 January ==
List of shipwrecks: 4 January 1820
Ship	State	Description
Charles	France	The ship was lost near Nantes, Loire-Inférieure. Her crew were rescued. She was on a voyage from Nantes to Marseille, Bouches-du-Rhône.
Indian Hunter	United States	The ship was abandoned in the Atlantic Ocean. Her crew were rescued by United States (United States). Indian Hunter was on a voyage from Bermuda to New York.
Vine	United Kingdom	The ship struck a rock at Strangford, County Antrim and was wrecked. She was on a voyage from Beaumaris, Anglesey to Berwick-upon-Tweed, Northumberland.

== 5 January ==
List of shipwrecks: 5 January 1820
Ship	State	Description
Mateldess	Portugal	The ship was lost at the mouth of the Rio Grande. She was on a voyage from "Acra" to Madeira.

== 6 January ==
List of shipwrecks: 6 January 1820
Ship	State	Description
Isabella	United Kingdom	The ship was driven ashore at Spurn Point, Yorkshire. Her crew were rescued by a lifeboat. She was on a voyage from Miramichi Bay to Hull, Yorkshire. Isabella was later refloated and taken in to Hull.

== 7 January ==
List of shipwrecks: 7 January 1820
Ship	State	Description
El Furia	Spain	The ship sprang a leak and foundered off Jamaica. She was on a voyage from Jamaica to Santa Marta, Viceroyalty of New Granada.
Flora	United Kingdom	The ship was wrecked at São Miguel, Azores, Portugal. Her crew were rescued.
Preussens Freywilliger	Prussia	The ship was wrecked on Læsø, Denmark. She was on a voyage from Pillau to London, United Kingdom.
Sultan	France	The ship was wrecked at Sables d'Olonne, Vendée. Her crew were rescued. She was on a voyage from Bordeaux, Gironde to "Rodon".
Wessaweskeay	United States	The ship was driven ashore and wrecked at the Wood Island Lighthouse, Maine. She was on a voyage from Havana, Cuba to Portsmouth, New Hampshire.
William & Elizabeth	United Kingdom	The ship was driven ashore near Poole, Dorset. She was on a voyage from London to Poole.

== 8 January ==
List of shipwrecks: 8 January 1820
Ship	State	Description
Charles	United Kingdom	The schooner was wrecked off Port Royal, Jamaica.
William Henry	United Kingdom	The schooner was driven ashore at Westgate-on-Sea, Kent. She was on a voyage from London to Vlissingen, Zeeland, Netherlands. William Henry was refloated on 12 January and taken in to Margate.

== 9 January ==
List of shipwrecks: 9 January 1820
Ship	State	Description
Eliza	United Kingdom	The ship was driven ashore and wrecked at Eyemouth, Berwickshire. Her crew were rescued. She was on a voyage from Leith, Lothian to Berwick-upon-Tweed, Northumberland.
Ibbetson	United Kingdom	The schooner ran aground on the Spaniard Sand, in the North Sea off the coast of Kent. She was on a voyage from Cork to London. Ibbetson was later refloated with the assistance of seven smacks and taken in to Whitstable, Kent.
Magnet	United Kingdom	The ship was driven ashore and wrecked 3 nautical miles (5.6 km) north of Peterhead, Aberdeenshire. Her crew were rescued. Her crew were rescued.
Maria	United Kingdom	The ship was wrecked on the East Barrows Sand, in the North Sea off the coast of Essex. All on board were rescued She was on a voyage from Rotterdam, South Holland, Netherlands to London.
Unnamed	United Kingdom	The barque ran aground on the Spaniard Sand. She was refloated with the assistance of several smacks and taken in to The Swale.

== 10 January ==
List of shipwrecks: 10 January 1820
Ship	State	Description
Elizabeth	United States	The ship was driven ashore and wrecked at Deal, New Jersey.
General Gadsden	United States	The ship was driven ashore at Deal, New Jersey. All on board were rescued. She was on a voyage from Amsterdam, North Holland, Netherlands to New York.
John	United Kingdom	The collier was wrecked on the Stoney Binks, in the North Sea off the coast of County Durham. Her crew were rescued. She was on a voyage from South Shields, County Durham to London.
Sally	United States	The ship was wrecked in New Topsail Inlet. Her crew were rescued. She was on a voyage from Saint Thomas, Virgin Islands to Wilmington, Delaware.
Valor	United States	The ship was wrecked at Deal, New Jersey. She was on a voyage from Havana, Cuba to New York.

== 11 January ==
List of shipwrecks: 11 January 1820
Ship	State	Description
Isabella	United Kingdom	The sloop was wrecked on Mahee Island, County Down. She was on a voyage from Larne, County Antrim to Dublin.
John	United Kingdom	The ship was wrecked near Hull, Yorkshire. She was on a voyage from South Shields, County Durham to London.

== 12 January ==
List of shipwrecks: 12 January 1820
Ship	State	Description
Active	Portugal	The ship was wrecked at Terceira, Azores.
Ann	United Kingdom	The ship was driven ashore and wrecked in Galway Bay. She was on a voyage from Berbice to London.
Felix Ventura	Portugal	The ship was wrecked at Terceira.
Fleece	United Kingdom	The ship ran aground at Newry, County Antrim. Her crew were rescued.
Hope	United Kingdom	The ship was wrecked at Terceira.
Lord Cathcart	United Kingdom	The ship struck a rock and foundered in the Adriatic Sea 5 nautical miles (9.3 km) east north east of Pelagosa, Kingdom of the Two Sicilies with the loss of five of her nineteen crew. She was on a voyage from Fiume, Republic of Venice to an English port.
Thomas	United Kingdom	The ship was wrecked at Terceira.
Valency	United Kingdom	The ship was lost near Ceuta, Spain. She was on a voyage from Messina, Sicily to London.
Young William	United Kingdom	The ship was wrecked at Terceira.

== 13 January ==
List of shipwrecks: 13 January 1820
Ship	State	Description
Eliza	United States	The ship was wrecked on the coast of Newfoundland, British North America. She was on a voyage from Boston, Massachusetts to Halifax, Nova Scotia, British North America.

== 15 January ==
List of shipwrecks: 15 January 1820
Ship	State	Description
Duke of Wellington	United Kingdom	The ship was wrecked in a gale at São Miguel, Azores, Portugal.
Elizabeth and Sarah	United Kingdom	The ship was last seen in the Atlantic Ocean (46°55′N 12°00′W whilst on a voyage from São Miguel to London. Presumed subsequently foundered with the loss of all hands.
Twelve Brothers	United Kingdom	The schooner was driven ashore crewless at Blakeney, Norfolk.

== 16 January ==
List of shipwrecks: 16 January 1820
Ship	State	Description
Ann	United Kingdom	The ship ran aground in the Isles of Scilly. She was on a voyage from Swansea, Glamorgan to Teignmouth, Devon. She was refloated with assistance and taken in to St. Mary's, Isles of Scilly.
Diana	United Kingdom	The ship struck a rock and sank in Loch Tarbert. She was on a voyage from Limerick to Liverpool, Lancashire.
Helen	United Kingdom	The ship was driven ashore and wrecked at Ardgowan House, Renfrewshire. She was on a voyage from Greenock, Renfrewshire to Jamaica.
Mary	United Kingdom	The sloop was driven ashore near Wells-next-the-Sea, Norfolk. She was on a voyage from Alnmouth, Northumberland to London.

== 17 January ==
List of shipwrecks: 17 January 1820
Ship	State	Description
Friends	United States	The ship was wrecked near Eastport, Maine.
George and Jenny	United Kingdom	The sloop was driven ashore at Southport, Lancashire. Her crew were rescued. She was on a voyage from Limerick to Greenock, Renfrewshire.
Heart of Oak	United Kingdom	The sloop ran aground, capsized and was wrecked at Brielle, South Holland, Netherlands Her crew survived.
Helen	France	The ship was wrecked on Long Island, New York, United States. She was on a voyage from Bordeaux, Gironde to New York City.
Isis	United Kingdom	The ship struck rocks in the Sound of Hoy. She put in to Stromness, Orkney Islands for repairs.
Jeune Corrinne	France	The ship ran aground on the Îles Deux Moulins, Gironde. She was on a voyage from New Orleans, Louisiana, United States to Bordeaux, Gironde.
Midas	United States	The ship was run down and sunk off Boston, Massachusetts. Her crew were rescued. She was on a voyage from Saint Domingo to Boston.
Quatre Sœurs	France	The ship was driven ashore and wrecked at Manasquan, New Jersey, United States. She was on a voyage from Rio de Janeiro, Brazil to New York.
Rodney	United Kingdom	The brig was sunk by ice in the River Thames at Wapping, Middlesex.

== 18 January ==
List of shipwrecks: 18 January 1820
Ship	State	Description
Adventure	United Kingdom	The ship foundered in Dublin Bay with the loss of all hands She was on a voyage from Liverpool, Lancashire to Dublin.
Catherine	United Kingdom	The sloop foundered in the Irish Sea off Great Orme Head, Caernarvonshire with the loss of two of her crew. She was on a voyage from Liverpool to Pwllheli, Caernarvonshire.
Hero	United Kingdom	The sloop foundered in the Irish Sea off Great Orme Head. Her crew were rescued.
Jane	United Kingdom	The ship was driven ashore at Carlingford, County Louth. She was on a voyage from Newry, County Antrim to Whitehaven, Cumberland.
Mary Catherine	United Kingdom	The sloop foundered in the Irish Sea off Great Orme Head with the loss of two of her crew. She was on a voyage from Liverpool to Pwllheli.
Rubicon	United States	The full-rigged ship was driven ashore at Long Branch, New Jersey. She was on a voyage from Charleston, South Carolina to New York.
Union	United States	The ship was wrecked off Cape Ann, Massachusetts with the loss of nine lives. She was on a voyage from Halifax, Nova Scotia, British North America to Boston, Massachusetts.

== 19 January ==
List of shipwrecks: 19 January 1820
Ship	State	Description
Anne	United Kingdom	The ship ran aground, capsized and was wrecked at Kilcolgan, County Galway. Her crew were rescued. She was on a voyage from Berbice to London
Bountiful	United Kingdom	The ship was wrecked at Ambleteuse, Pas-de-Calais, France. Her crew were rescued.
Cleopatra	United Kingdom	The ship ran aground on Gray Point, Belfast Lough and sank. Her crew were rescued. She was on a voyage from Workington, Cumberland to Belfast, County Antrim.
Clio	United Kingdom	The ship sprang a leak and was abandoned in the North Sea off Flamborough Head, Yorkshire. Her crew were rescued by Dido (United Kingdom).
Cruiser	United Kingdom	The brig capsized and was wrecked off Wylfa, Anglesey with the loss of all hands. She was on a voyage from Liverpool, Lancashire to Great Yarmouth, Norfolk.
Dolphin	United Kingdom	The schooner was driven ashore and severely damaged in Swansea Bay. She was on a voyage from Dartmouth, Devon to Neath, Glamorgan.
Dumfries	United Kingdom	The ship sprang a leak and was abandoned at sea. Her crew were rescued by Mary Ann (United Kingdom). Dumfries was on a voyage from Cardiff, Glamorgan to Whitehaven, Cumberland.
Emilie	Norway	The ship was lost off Christiansand.
Friendship	United Kingdom	The ship ran aground in the River Tyne. She was on a voyage from Newcastle upon Tyne, Northumberland to London. She was refloated and taken in to South Shields, County Durham in a leaky condition.
Jennett	United Kingdom	The ship foundered in the Irish Sea off Howth, County Dublin with the loss of all hands.
Jobson	United Kingdom	The ship ran aground and sank at Porto Santo Stefano, Grand Duchy of Tuscany with the loss of a crew member. She was on a voyage from London to Genoa, Grand Duchy of Tuscany.
John & Mary	United Kingdom	The ship was sunk by ice at Wisbech, Cambridgeshire. She was on a voyage from Wisbech to London.
Margaret	United Kingdom	The ship was driven ashore at Eyemouth, Berwickshire. Her crew were rescued.
Mary	United Kingdom	The ship was driven ashore at Portpatrick, Wigtownshire. Her crew were rescued. She was on a voyage from Greenock, Renfrewshire to Liverpool, Lancashire.
Merton Hall	United Kingdom	The ship was driven ashore and wrecked at Ballantrae, Ayrshire. She was on a voyage from Belfast, County Antrim to Ayr.
Neptune	United Kingdom	The ship ran aground at Sunderland, County Durham and was wrecked.
Nicholas	United Kingdom	The ship was lost near Howth. Her crew were rescued by Countess (United Kingdom). Nicholas was on a voyage from Whitehaven, Cumberland to Dublin.
Providence	United Kingdom	The ship ran aground and was severely damaged on the Herd Sand, in the North Sea off South Shields, County Durham. She was refloated in late August and taken in to South Shields.
Resolution	United Kingdom	The ship was driven ashore at North Shields, County Durham. She was refloated on 16 February and taken in to South Shields.
Sprightly	United Kingdom	The ship was driven ashore by ice in the River Thames.
Supply	United Kingdom	The Mersey flat was lost near Amlwch, Anglesey with the loss of all hands.
Susan & Ann	United Kingdom	The ship ran aground on the Herd Sand. Her crew were rescued. She was later refloated.
Thomas and Alice	United Kingdom	The ship ran aground on the Herd Sand. She was later refloated and taken in to South Shields, where she was beached.
Three Brothers	United Kingdom	The ship was driven ashore and wrecked at North Shields.
Union	United Kingdom	The ship was driven ashore at Islandmagee, County Antrim with the loss of two lives.
Unnamed	Spain	The coaster was wrecked at A Coruña.

== 20 January ==
List of shipwrecks: 20 January 1820
Ship	State	Description
Charlotte	United Kingdom	The ship was wrecked on the Hook Sand with the loss of more than four lives. She was on a voyage from Pwllheli, Caernarvonshire to Bristol, Gloucestershire.
John	United Kingdom	The ship was driven ashore at St Martin's, Isles of Scilly. She was on a voyage from Prince Edward Island, British North America to Bristol. John was later refloated and taken in to St Mary's, Isles of Scilly.
Lamb	United Kingdom	The schooner foundered in the Bristol Channel off Lundy Island, Devon with the loss of at least three lives.
Margaret	United Kingdom	The ship was driven ashore at Quoddy Head, Maine, United States. She was on a voyage from St. Andrews, New Brunswick, British North America to Liverpool, Lancashire. Margaret was eventually refloated and taken in to a port.
Riga Packet	United Kingdom	The ship was dismasted and abandoned off St. Ives, Cornwall. She was on a voyage from Demerara to London.
Thetis	United Kingdom	The sloop was driven ashore near Ilfracombe, Devon with the loss of two lives. She was on a voyage from Ilfracombe to Bristol, Gloucestershire.
Unnamed	Flag unknown	The brig sank about 3 nautical miles (5.6 km) off Cape Cornwall, Cornwall.
Unnamed	United Kingdom	The brig foundered. She was on a voyage from an Irish port to Cardiff, Glamorgan.

== 21 January ==
List of shipwrecks: 21 January 1820
Ship	State	Description
Bell & Mary	United Kingdom	The sloop sank at South Shields, County Durham. She was refloated the next day and beached.
Drie Gesusters	Bremen	The ship was lost in the English Channel off Folkestone, Kent, United Kingdom. Her crew were rescued. She was on a voyage from the Charente to Bremen.
Edmund	United Kingdom	The ship was driven ashore on the Holderness coast, Yorkshire.
George	United Kingdom	The ship was lost off Worms Head, Glamorgan. Her four crew were rescued.
John	United Kingdom	The ship foundered in Rhossili Bay with the loss of all hands. She was on a voyage from Llanelli to Swansea, Glamorgan.
Minerva	United Kingdom	The collier was wrecked on the Stony Binks, in the North Sea off the mouth of the Humber with the loss of all hands. She was on a voyage from Newcastle upon Tyne, Northumberland to Rochester, Kent.
Picton	United Kingdom	The ship was wrecked on Foreland Point, Devon. She was on a voyage from Bristol, Gloucestershire to Barbados. Two crewmen died; remainder of crew and woman passenger were rescued.
Ponsonby	United Kingdom	The ship was driven ashore and capsized at Newport, Monmouthshire.
Rambler	United Kingdom	The ship was driven ashore and wrecked at Pakefield, Suffolk. Her crew were rescued. She was on a voyage from Newcastle upon Tyne to Great Yarmouth, Norfolk. Rambler was refloated in June and taken in to Great Yarmouth.
Rubicon	United States	The ship was driven ashore and wrecked at Long Branch, New Jersey. She was on a voyage from Charleston, South Carolina to New York.
William Penn	United Kingdom	The ship was lost in the English Grounds. Her crew were rescued. She was on a voyage from Youghal, County Cork to Bristol.

== 22 January ==
List of shipwrecks: 22 January 1820
Ship	State	Description
Hope	United Kingdom	The ship was wrecked off Margate, Kent. Her crew were saved. She was on a voyage from London to Portsmouth, Hampshire.
Hugh Crawford	United Kingdom	The ship struck a rock and was wrecked in the Clyde 6 nautical miles (11 km) from Dunoon, Ayrshire. She was on a voyage from Charleston, South Carolina, United States to Greenock, Renfrewshire.
Spartan	United Kingdom	The ship was driven ashore and severely damaged at Londonderry. She was later refloated.
Victory	United States	The brig was abandoned at sea. Her crew were rescued by Agile (United States). Victory was on a voyage from Surinam to Boston, Massachusetts.

== 23 January ==
List of shipwrecks: 23 January 1820
Ship	State	Description
Alabama	United States	The ship was driven ashore 25 nautical miles (46 km) from Aux Cayes, Haiti. Her crew were rescued. She was plundered by the local inhabitants.
Anna	United Kingdom	The ship was driven ashore in Dunworthy Bay.
Rabbit	United Kingdom	The ship was lost near the Carr Rock. Her crew were rescued.

== 24 January ==
List of shipwrecks: 24 January 1820
Ship	State	Description
Brothers	United Kingdom	The brig was driven ashore at Beachy Head, Sussex. Her crew were rescued. She was on a voyage from Barcelona, Spain to London. Brothers was later refloated and taken in to Newhaven, Sussex.
Collins	United Kingdom	The ship was driven ashore in Dundrum Bay. She was on a voyage from Saint John, New Brunswick, British North America to Liverpool, Lancashire.
Jean McCleary	United Kingdom	The ship was driven ashore at Cushendun, County Antrim. She was on a voyage from Whitehaven, Cumberland to Londonderry.
John Edwards	United Kingdom	The ship struck a rock and sank at Tobermory, Isle of Mull. Her crew were rescued. She was on a voyage from Sligo to Dublin.
Lady Bulkeley	United Kingdom	The ship sank in the Irish Sea off Southport, Lancashire with the loss of all hands.
Mean McCleary	United Kingdom	The ship ran aground at "Cashendom". Her crew were rescued. She was on a voyage from Whitehaven, Cumberland to Londonderry.
Minerva	United Kingdom	The ship was abandoned off Memel, Prussia. She was on a voyage from London to Memel. Minerva subsequently came ashore at Windau, Courland Governorate.

== 25 January ==
List of shipwrecks: 25 January 1820
Ship	State	Description
Active	United States	The ship was driven ashore in Prince's Bay, Staten Island, New York. She was on a voyage from Martinique to New York City.
Alabama	United States	The ship was driven ashore on the coast of Haiti and was plundered by 400 of the local inhabitants. Her crew were rescued.
Anacreon	United Kingdom	The ship was wrecked on the north west coast of Wangerooge, Kingdom of Hanover. Her crew were rescued. She was on a voyage from Havana, Cuba to Bremen.
Belle Sauvage	United States	The ship foundered in the Atlantic Ocean. Her crew were rescued. She was on a voyage from Newport, Rhode Island to Bilbao, Spain.
Countess of Leven and Melville	United Kingdom	The ship was wrecked on Lastovo, Austrian Empire with the loss of all but two of those on board. She was on a voyage from Malta to Trieste.
Giacomina	Malta	The ship was driven ashore and wrecked in St. Paul's Bay, Malta. She was on a voyage from Constantinople, Ottoman Empire to Malta.
Integrity	United Kingdom	The transport ship was driven ashore and damaged at Mountbatten, Devon. She was on a voyage from Chatham, Kent to Plymouth, Devon. She was later refloated.
Isabella	United Kingdom	The ship ran aground on the Home Sand, in the North Sea off Great Yarmouth, Norfolk. She was on a voyage from Zakynthos, Greece to Hull, Yorkshire. Isabella was refloated on 28 January and taken in to Hull.
Leda	United Kingdom	The ship was driven ashore and wrecked at Malta. Her crew were rescued. She was on a voyage from Trondheim, Norway to Ancona, Papal States.
Mary	United States	The ship was lost at Cold Spring, New York. She was on a voyage from Saint Thomas, Virgin Islands to New York City.
Rose	United Kingdom	The ship ran aground and was damaged at Plymouth, Devon. She was on a voyage from Cork to London. Rose was later refloated.
San Fidel	Spain	The ship struck rocks and sank off Gibraltar. She was on a voyage from "Caril" to Algeciras.
Sisters	United Kingdom	The ship was wrecked at Saron, Cantabria, Spain with the loss of all hands. She was on a voyage from Tarragona, Spain to Hull.
Stag	United States	The ship was driven ashore and wrecked near the Cape Henry Lighthouse, Virginia. Her crew were rescued. She was on a voyage from Sumatra to Baltimore, Maryland.
Two Generals	United States	The ship sprang a leak and was abandoned in the Atlantic Ocean. All on board were rescued by George Crosard (France). Two Generals was on a voyage from Charleston, South Carolina to Bordeaux, Gironde, France.
Unnamed	Flag unknown	The ship was wrecked at Malta.

== 26 January ==
List of shipwrecks: 26 January 1820
Ship	State	Description
Augusta	United Kingdom	The ship sprang a leak and was abandoned in the Atlantic Ocean (51°00′N 20°30′W). Five of her eleven crew died before the survivors were rescued on 9 February by Everthorpe (United Kingdom). Augusta was on a voyage from Saint John, New Brunswick, British North America to Dumfries.
Elizabeth	United Kingdom	The ship was driven ashore and severely damaged at Scarborough, Yorkshire.
Giacomina	Ottoman Empire	The ship was wrecked in St. Paul's Bay, Malta.
Jeune Denis	United Kingdom	The ship put in to Weymouth, Dorset, United Kingdom in a sinking condition. She was on a voyage from Senegal to Havre de Grâce, Seine-Inférieure.
John and Mary	United Kingdom	The ship was sunk by ice at Wisbech, Cambridgeshire. She was on a voyage from Wisbech to London.
Leda	Norway	The ship was wrecked in Melleha Bay, Malta.
Thetis	United Kingdom	The ship was driven ashore at Worthing, Sussex. She was on a voyage from Malta to London. Thetis was later refloated and taken in to Shoreham-by-Sea, Sussex.
Union	United Kingdom	The ship ran aground and sank at St Helen's, Isles of Scilly. She was on a voyage from Chepstow, Monmouthshire to St Helen's. Union was later refloated and taken in to St. Mary's, Isles of Scilly.

== 27 January ==
List of shipwrecks: 27 January 1820
Ship	State	Description
Dalrymple	United Kingdom	The ship ran aground on the Long Sand, in the North Sea off the coast of Essex. She was on a voyage from the Bay of Fundy to Colchester, Essex. She was refloated and put in to Harwich, Essex.
Nile	United Kingdom	The ship was driven ashore at "Rieutienville", Pas-de-Calais, France. She was on a voyage from Malta to London. Nile was refloated and taken in to Le Crotoy, Somme, France.
Riga	United Kingdom	The packet ship was abandoned off St. Ives, Cornwall. She was on a voyage from London to Demerara.
Young Thomas	United Kingdom	The ship was driven ashore at Filey, Yorkshire. She was refloated and taken in to Scarborough, Yorkshire in a severely damaged condition.

== 28 January ==
List of shipwrecks: 28 January 1820
Ship	State	Description
Borneo	United Kingdom	The ship was wrecked near "Carragona", on the north west coast of America.
Jane	United Kingdom	The ship was driven ashore near Bayonne, Basses-Pyrénées, France. Her crew were rescued. She was on a voyage from Newfoundland, British North America to Bilbao, Spain.
John	United Kingdom	The ship was wrecked in the North Sea and was abandoned by her crew. She was on a voyage from South Shields, County Durham to London.
Sally	United States	The ship was lost in the Turks Islands. She was on a voyage from Portsmouth, New Hampshire to Gonaïves, Haiti.
Tiger	United Kingdom	The ship was driven ashore at Bayonne. Her crew were rescued. She was on a voyage from Newfoundland to Bilbao.

== 29 January ==
List of shipwrecks: 29 January 1820
Ship	State	Description
Nancy	United Kingdom	The ship was wrecked on the Naas Sand with the loss of a crew member. She was on a voyage from Swansea, Glamorgan to Bridgwater, Somerset.
Sisters	United Kingdom	The ship was wrecked on the Naas Sand. She was on a voyage from Swansea to Bridgwater.
Thomas	United Kingdom	The ship was wrecked on the Naas Sand. She was on a voyage from Swansea to Bridgwater.
Unnamed	United Kingdom	The brig was abandoned in the North Sea. Her crew were rescued by Friends (United Kingdom).

== 30 January ==
List of shipwrecks: 30 January 1820
Ship	State	Description
Fleece	United Kingdom	The ship ran aground on the Spit Sand, in the English Channel off Portsmouth, Hampshire and was wrecked. She was on a voyage from Sunderland, County Durham to Portsmouth.
Fortune	United Kingdom	The ship was wrecked on "Cazgiel Island" in the Gulf of Venice. Her crew were rescued. She was on a voyage from London to Fiume, Austrian Empire.

=== 31 January ===
List of shipwrecks: 31 January 1820
Ship	State	Description
Unnamed	United Kingdom	The ship ran aground on the Cross Sand, in the North Sea off the coast of Norfolk.

== Unknown date ==
List of shipwrecks: Unknown date in January 1820
Ship	State	Description
Belinda	United Kingdom	The ship was damaged at Penzance, Cornwall. She was on a voyage from London to Cork.
Bellona	Spanish Navy	The ship was wrecked at Veracruz, Viceroyalty of New Granada.
Consulado de la Havannah	Spanish Navy	The ship was wrecked at Veracruz.
Earnest	United Kingdom	The ship was driven ashore near Cherbourg, Seine-Inférieure, France. She was on a voyage from Pernambuco, Brazil to Havre de Grâce, Seine-Inférieure.
Guia	Spanish Navy	The ship was wrecked at Veracruz.
Hugh	United States	The ship ran aground at Toward Point, Argyllshire, United Kingdom. Her crew were rescued. She was on a voyage from Charleston, South Carolina to the Clyde.
Louisa	France	The ship was wrecked at Lannion, Côtes-du-Nord. She was on a voyage from Bordeaux, Gironde to Lannion.
USS Lynx	United States Navy	The schooner departed from St. Mary's, Georgia for Jamaica 11 January. No further trace, presumed foundered in a hurricane off Jamaica with the loss of all 50 hands.
Martha	United States	The ship was lost off Matanzas, Cuba. She was on a voyage from Charleston, South Carolina to Matanzas.
Medina	United Kingdom	The schooner ran aground off Saint-Malo, Ille-et-Vilaine and was wrecked. Her crew were rescued by rocket apparatus. She was on a voyage from Cádiz, Spain to Bristol.
Princess Royal	United Kingdom	The ship was wrecked on the Hogsty Reef. She was on a voyage from Jamaica to Bermuda.
Rippon	United Kingdom	The ship was destroyed by fire in the North Sea. She was on a voyage from London to York.
Rising Sun	Netherlands	The ship was lost whilst on a voyage from Bordeaux, Gironde, France to Amsterdam, North Holland.
Rose Victoire	France	The ship foundered in the English Channel off Guernsey, Channel Islands. Her crew were rescued.
St. Johannes	Stettin	The ship was wrecked near "Swenor". Her crew were rescued. She was on a voyage from Leith, Lothian, United Kingdom to Stettin.
Shannon	United Kingdom	The ship was driven ashore and wrecked at St. Mary's, Isles of Scilly. Her crew were rescued.
Swallow	United Kingdom	The brig was wrecked at Portishead, Gloucestershire in early January. She was on a voyage from the Cape of Good Hope, Cape Colony to Bristol, Gloucestershire.
Young Thomas	United Kingdom	The ship was driven ashore near Filey Bridge, Yorkshire in late January. She was later refloated and taken in to Scarborough, Yorkshire.
Unnamed	Flag unknown	The ship was driven ashore at the mouth of the Tiber.
Two unnamed vessels	Flags unknown	The ships were driven ashore at Santa Marinella, Papal States.
Unnamed	Flag unknown	The ship was driven ashore at "Montalta".
Unnamed	(United Kingdom of Great Britain and Ireland) British North America	The schooner was lost near Eastport, Maine, United States in mid-January.
