= List of shipwrecks in April 1821 =

The list of shipwrecks in April 1821 includes ships sunk, wrecked, or otherwise lost during April 1821.

== 1 April ==
List of shipwrecks: 1 April 1821
| Ship | State | Description |
|---|---|---|
| Trio | United Kingdom | The ship was driven ashore at Great Yarmouth, Norfolk. She was refloated on 10 April and taken in to Great Yarmouth for repairs. |

== 2 April ==
List of shipwrecks: 2 April 1821
| Ship | State | Description |
|---|---|---|
| Flora | United Kingdom | The ship was driven ashore and wrecked in the King Road. She was on a voyage from Bristol, Gloucestershire to New Brunswick, British North America. Flora was later refloated. |
| Golden Fleece | United Kingdom | The ship was wrecked on the Goodwin Sands, Kent. Her crew were rescued. She was on a voyage from South Shields, County Durham to Ramsgate, Kent. |
| Hope | United Kingdom | The ship capsized and sank in the Thames Estuary off Leigh-on-Sea, Essex. She was on a voyage from Harlingen, Friesland, Netherlands to London. Hope was later refloated and taken in to London. |
| Magnet | United States | The ship was driven ashore at Liverpool, Lancashire, United Kingdom. She was refloated on 30 April and taken in to Liverpool. |

== 3 April ==
List of shipwrecks: 3 April 1821
| Ship | State | Description |
|---|---|---|
| Adolphe | France | The ship was driven ashore and wrecked at Padstow, Cornwall, United Kingdom. |
| Freundschaft | Lübeck | The ship was driven ashore and wrecked at Rye, Sussex, United Kingdom with the loss of seven of her crew. She was on a voyage from Málaga, Spain to Lübeck. |
| Goede Hoop | Netherlands | The ship was wrecked on Ameland, Friesland with the loss of all hands. She was on a voyage from Hull, Yorkshire, United Kingdom to Groningen. |
| Spring | United Kingdom | The ship foundered in the Atlantic Ocean off Campos dos Goytaczes, Brazil. |
| Tom & Margaret | United Kingdom | The ship was wrecked on the Kentish Knock. Her crew were rescued. She was on a voyage from Sunderland, County Durham to Portsmouth, Hampshire. |

== 4 April ==
List of shipwrecks: 4 April 1821
| Ship | State | Description |
|---|---|---|
| Mold | United Kingdom | The ship sprang a leak and sank in the North Sea off the Dudgeon Bank. She was on a voyage from South Shields, County Durham to London. |
| Success | United Kingdom | The ship was driven ashore at Bangor, County Down. |
| Weser | United States | The ship was driven ashore and wrecked at Sligo, United Kingdom. |

== 5 April ==
List of shipwrecks: 5 April 1821
| Ship | State | Description |
|---|---|---|
| Speculation | United Kingdom | The ship was driven ashore at Mount Batten, Plymouth, Devon. |
| Young Augustus | United Kingdom | The ship foundered in the Atlantic Ocean off Lands End, Cornwall. Her crew were rescued. She was on a voyage from Dungarvan, County Waterford to Portsmouth, Hampshire. |

== 6 April ==
List of shipwrecks: 6 April 1821
| Ship | State | Description |
|---|---|---|
| Concert | United Kingdom | The ship foundered in the Irish Sea off Caernarfon. Her crew were rescued. She was on a voyage from Liverpool, Lancashire to Barmouth, Merionethshire. |
| Johns | United Kingdom | The ship struck the Hod Sand, in the North Sea off the coast of Norfolk. She was consequently beached at Great Yarmouth, where she sank. |
| Langston | United Kingdom | The ship ran aground on Scroby Sands, Norfolk and sank. Her crew were rescued. She was on a voyage from Bridgwater, Somerset to Hull, Yorkshire. |
| Venus | (United Kingdom of Great Britain and Ireland) Saint Vincent | The schooner was lost 30 nautical miles (56 km) from Kingston, Jamaica. |

== 7 April ==
List of shipwrecks: 7 April 1821
| Ship | State | Description |
|---|---|---|
| Jane | United Kingdom | The ship was wrecked at Whitby, Yorkshire with the loss of five of her eight crew. |
| San Josef | Spain | The brig was wrecked on Barbuda. |
| Venus | United Kingdom | The ship struck the Whitby Rock. She was taken in to Whitby where she sank. |
| San Josef | Spain | The brig was wrecked on Barbuda. |

== 8 April ==
List of shipwrecks: 8 April 1821
| Ship | State | Description |
|---|---|---|
| Ann | United Kingdom | The ship was driven ashore and wrecked at Memel, Prussia. Her crew were rescued. She was on a voyage from Hull, Yorkshire to Memel. |
| Emma | Stettin | The ship was wrecked at Torcka, Sweden. She was on a voyage from London, United Kingdom to Stettin. |

== 9 April ==
List of shipwrecks: 9 April 1821
| Ship | State | Description |
|---|---|---|
| Doris | France | The ship was lost at Guadeloupe. |

== 10 April ==
List of shipwrecks: 10 April 1821
| Ship | State | Description |
|---|---|---|
| Fairly | United Kingdom | The ship foundered off the Isle of Skye. She was on a voyage from Liverpool, Lancashire to Stornoway, Isle of Lewis. |
| Thomas | United Kingdom | The ship was driven ashore on the coast of Sweden. She was later refloated and proceeded to Copenhagen, Denmark. |

== 12 April ==
List of shipwrecks: 12 April 1821
| Ship | State | Description |
|---|---|---|
| Supply | United Kingdom | The ship was driven ashore at Lønstrup, Denmark. She was on a voyage from London to Memel, Prussia. Supply was later refloated; she departed for Memel on 18 April. |
| Union | United Kingdom | The ship departed from the Clyde for Quebec, British North America. No further trace, presumed foundered with the loss of all hands. |

== 13 April ==
List of shipwrecks: 13 April 1821
| Ship | State | Description |
|---|---|---|
| Belle Rose | France | The ship foundered in the English Channel off Havre de Grâce, Seine-Inférieure with the loss of her captain. She was on a voyage from Marseille, Bouches-du-Rhône to Rouen, Seine-Inférieure. |

== 14 April ==
List of shipwrecks: 14 April 1821
| Ship | State | Description |
|---|---|---|
| Ann | United Kingdom | The sloop foundered off Great Orme Head, Caernarvonshire. She was on a voyage from Liverpool, Lancashire to Amlwch, Anglesey. |
| Janet | United Kingdom | The brig was driven ashore and wrecked at Whitby, Yorkshire with the loss of five of her eight crew. The survivors were rescued by rocket apparatus. |
| Thomas and Mary | United Kingdom | The ship capsized off Portland Bill. Dorset with the loss of all hands. |

== 15 April ==
List of shipwrecks: 15 April 1821
| Ship | State | Description |
|---|---|---|
| Ann | United Kingdom | The sloop foundered in the Irish Sea off Great Orme Head, Caernarvonshire. Her crew were rescued. She was on a voyage from Liverpool, Lancashire to Amlwch, Anglesey, |
| Confiance | France | The ship was wrecked on the Île d'Oléron, Charente Maritime. Her crew were rescued. She was on a voyage from Bordeaux, Gironde to Senegal. |
| Rising Sun | United States | The ship was wrecked at the mouth of the Guaymas River. She was on a voyage from New York to Angostura, Venezuela. |
| Thomas and Mary | United Kingdom | The boat foundered in the English Channel off Portland Bill, Dorset with the loss of all seven of her crew. |

== 17 April ==
List of shipwrecks: 17 April 1821
| Ship | State | Description |
|---|---|---|
| Pesensia | Unknown | The ship was driven ashore on Terschelling, Friesland, Netherlands. She was on a voyage from "Frederickshall" to Calais, France. |

== 18 April ==
List of shipwrecks: 18 April 1821
| Ship | State | Description |
|---|---|---|
| Remittance | United States | The schooner foundered in the Atlantic Ocean off Charleston, South Carolina. She was on a voyage from Saint Croix, Virgin Islands to Savannah, Georgia. |
| United Kingdom | United Kingdom | The ship was driven ashore and sank at St. Andrew, New Brunswick, British North America. |
| Vrow Maria | Netherlands | The ship foundered off Juist, Kingdom of Hanover. Her crew were rescued. She was on a voyage from Eckernförde, Duchy of Schleswig to Amsterdam, North Holland. |

== 19 April ==
List of shipwrecks: 19 April 1821
| Ship | State | Description |
|---|---|---|
| Ann | United Kingdom | The ship foundered in the Atlantic Ocean (45°50′N 17°30′W). Her crew were rescued by Sally and James (United Kingdom). She was on a voyage from Teignmouth, Devon to Newfoundland, British North America. |
| Favourite | United Kingdom | The ship was wrecked at St. Domingo, Dominican Republic. Her crew were rescued. She was on a voyage from Kingston, Jamaica to Monte Christo, Colombia. |

== 22 April ==
List of shipwrecks: 22 April 1821
| Ship | State | Description |
|---|---|---|
| Fortuna | Prussia | The ship struck the Long Sand, in the North Sea off Harwich, Essex, United Kingdom. Her crew were rescued by a Barking Smack. She was refloated on 30 April and taken in to Harwich. |

== 24 April ==
List of shipwrecks: 24 April 1821
| Ship | State | Description |
|---|---|---|
| Agnes | United Kingdom | The ship was run down and sunk in the Atlantic Ocean by Union (United Kingdom). All on board were rescued by Union. |
| Earl of Sandwich | United Kingdom | The drogher was wrecked at St. Lucia. |

== 25 April ==
List of shipwrecks: 25 April 1821
| Ship | State | Description |
|---|---|---|
| Wharton | United Kingdom | The ship sprang a leak in the Atlantic Ocean (46°37′N 22°16′W) and was abandoned by her crew, who were rescued by Wilson (United Kingdom). She was on a voyage from Portsmouth, Hampshire to Miramichi Bay. |

== 27 April ==
List of shipwrecks: 27 April 1821
| Ship | State | Description |
|---|---|---|
| Mary | United Kingdom | The ship ran aground near the Old Head of Kinsale, County Cork. She was on a voyage from New Orleans, Louisiana, United States to Havre de Grâce, Seine-Inférieure, France. Mary was refloated on 29 April and taken in to Kinsale. |

== 28 April ==
List of shipwrecks: 28 April 1821
| Ship | State | Description |
|---|---|---|
| Hall | United Kingdom | The ship was driven ashore at Havana, Cuba. She was on a voyage from Jamaica to Liverpool, Lancashire. Hall was refloated on 3 July and taken in to Havana for repairs. |

== 29 April ==
List of shipwrecks: 29 April 1821
| Ship | State | Description |
|---|---|---|
| Fly | United Kingdom | The ship ran aground in The Wash off King's Lynn, Norfolk and sank. Her crew were rescued. She was on a voyage from Newcastle upon Tyne, Northumberland to King's Lynn. Fly was later refloated and taken in to King's Lynn. |
| Hall | United Kingdom | The ship was driven ashore at Havana, Cuba. She was on a voyage from Jamaica to Liverpool, Lancashire. |
| Lord Cathcart | United Kingdom | The ship sprang a leak and foundered in the Atlantic Ocean (45°38′N 26°47′W) Her crew were rescued by Neptune (United Kingdom). She was on a voyage from London to Quebec, British North America. |
| Neath Castle | United Kingdom | The ship ran aground and sank at Dover, Kent. She was on a voyage from Portsmouth, Hampshire to Deptford, Kent. |
| Teat's Hill | United Kingdom | The ship struck the Black Rock and foundered. She was on a voyage from Plymouth, Devon to Falmouth, Cornwall. She was later refloated and taken in to Falmouth. |

== 30 April ==
List of shipwrecks: 30 April 1821
| Ship | State | Description |
|---|---|---|
| Birmingham | United Kingdom | The ship struck the Runnel Stone and sank with the loss of six of the eight people on board. She was on a voyage from Cardiff, Glamorgan to Havre de Grâce, Seine-Inférieure, France. |
| Commerce | United Kingdom | The ship was driven ashore at Dover, Kent. She was on a voyage from Youghall, County Cork to London. Commerce was later refloated. She sailed for London on 2 May. |
| Hall | United Kingdom | The ship was driven ashore and wrecked at Havana, Cuba. |
| Vrow Hendrika | United Kingdom | The ship was in collision with a Russian vessel and was abandoned in the North Sea. Her crew were rescued by Dutch fishing vessels. She was on a voyage from London to Amsterdam, North Holland. Vrow Hendrika was taken in to Brielle, South Holland on 5 May. |

== Unknown date ==
List of shipwrecks: Unknown date 1821
| Ship | State | Description |
|---|---|---|
| Margaretta | Kingdom of Hanover | The ship was lost off the coast of Greenland in mid-April. |
| Marsh | United Kingdom | The ship ran aground off Carriacou and was wrecked in early April. She was on a voyage from London to Grenada. |
| Neptune | United Kingdom | The ship was sunk by ice off Baltic Port, Russia before 11 April. She was on a voyage from Messina, Sicily to Saint Petersburg, Russia. |
| Standhaftighed | Netherlands | The ship was wrecked near "Schermoeke". She was on a voyage from "Swelvig" to Amsterdam, North Holland. |
| Waterloo | United Kingdom | The ship was wrecked at Philadelphia, Pennsylvania, United States at the end of April. She was on a voyage from Havana, Cuba to Rotterdam, South Holland, Netherlands. |
| Wright | United Kingdom | The ship sank near Whitehaven, Cumberland. She was on a voyage from Donaghadee, County Antrim to Whitehaven. |
