= British Hero (1809 ship) =

History

United Kingdom
- Name: British Hero
- Owner: 1813:Carling (or Carlins) & Co.; 1816:Crow & Co.
- Builder: Simon Temple, Jarrow
- Launched: 1809
- Fate: Wrecked November 1816

General characteristics
- Tons burthen: 587 (bm)
- Armament: 10 × 18-pounder carronades

British Hero was a British ship launched at Jarrow in 1809. She initially was a government transport and so did not appear in Lloyd's Register (LR) or the Register of Shipping (RS) until she came into mercantile service c. 1813. She was lost in November 1816 on a voyage to India.

== Career ==
A violent gale hit the Tagus on 19 December 1812. Among the vessels sustaining damage was the "British Hero Transport", which lost her cables and anchors.

She first appeared in the Register of Shipping in the 1813 volume with Cockerill, master, Carling & Co., owners, and trade Plymouth transport.

The British East India Company (EIC) had in 1813 lost its monopoly on the trade between Britain and India and numerous shipowners proceeded to sail their vessels on the newly-legal trade. Lloyd's Register for 1816 showed her master as Edwards, her owner as Crow & Co., and her trade as London–India. She had undergone small repairs in 1816.

On 22 May 1816 British Hero, J. Edwards, master, sailed for India under a license issued by the EIC. On 5 June British Hero, Edwards, master, arrived at Madeira from London, and sailed on the 8th for Bengal. She arrived at the Cape of Good Hope on 30 July, and on 18 August sailed for Madras and Bengal.

== Fate ==
Lloyd's List reported that British Hero had wrecked on 3 November 1816 on the Diamond Rock off Aracan. She had struck a hidden rock in clear weather some days after she left Madras. She struck in the evening and by 10pm crew and passengers had taken to the ship's boats. They then sailed to Chittagong, where they arrived on 9 November.
