= Temple shipbuilders =

English family business

Temple shipbuilders was a family business in North East England during the late eighteenth century and the early nineteenth century.

== Simon Temple, the Elder ==
Simon Temple (1728–1805) was born in Crayke, North Yorkshire. By 1780 he was advertising himself as a shipwright in South Shields.

== Simon Temple, the Younger ==
Simon Temple (1759–1815) also born in Crayke opened a shipbuilding yard in Thrift Street, South Shields, and established a colliery in Jarrow.

== William Smoult Temple ==
Was a shipbuilder at Jarrow (1811 - 1812).

== Ships ==
=== Merchant vessels ===
- Admiral Aplin (1802 EIC ship), an East Indiaman
- Admiral Gambier (1807 ship)
- Archduke Charles (1809 ship)
- Atlas (1801 South Shields ship)
- British Hero (1809 ship)
- British Tar (1792 ship)
- Egfrid (1810 ship)
- Herculean (1799 ship)
- Hercules (1801 ship)
- Imperial (1802 ship)
- Indian (1810 ship)
- Lord Cathcart (1807 Shields ship)
- Lord Cathcart (1808 ship)
- Lord Eldon (1802 EIC ship), an East Indiaman
- Lord Melville, see HMS Porpoise (1804)
- Malabar (1804 ship)
- Northumberland (1797 ship)
- Oswin (1810 ship)
- Pilot (1813 ship)
- Rolla (1800 ship)
- Warrior, see HMS Vulture

=== Naval vessels ===
- HMS Banterer (1807), name ship of her class
- HMS Coquette (1807), built as HMS Queen Mab but renamed
- HMS Crocodile (1806), sixth-rate post ship
- Pandour, renamed HMS Cossack (1806), before launch; sixth-rate
- HMS Saldanha (1809), a frigate
