= Oswin (1810 ship) =

History

United Kingdom
- Name: Oswin
- Namesake: Oswine of Deira
- Owner: 1810:Atkinson; 1811:T. Brown
- Builder: Temple shipbuilders, South Shields
- Launched: 25 August 1810
- Fate: Foundered 31 January 1819

General characteristics
- Tons burthen: 441 (bm)
- Armament: 8 guns

Oswin was launched in 1810. In 1818 she sailed for India. She foundered at sea in January 1819. All aboard survived despite having had to sail in a longboat for almost two weeks over 1400 miles to Saint Helena.

== Career ==
Oswin first appeared in Lloyd's List in 1811 with Atkinson, master, changing to Perkins, Templer, owner, changing to T. Brown, and trade London, changing to London transport.

In 1813 the EIC lost its monopoly on the trade between India and Britain. British ships were then free to sail to India or the Indian Ocean under a license from the EIC. Oswin was one of the many vessels that came to take advantage of the opportunity.

Lloyd's Register for 1819 showed Oswin with J. Kay, master, T.&R. Brown, owners, and London–Fort William, India. On 18 April 1818 Oswin sailed for India.

== Fate ==
Oswin was homeward bound from India when on 27 January 1819 she sprang a leak in a gale off Cape Agulhas. Eventually the water came into her faster than the pumps could manage. Captain Kay, the crew, and the one passenger, Lt. Nicholson of the 71st Foot, took to her longboat after provisioning it. They abandoned Oswin on the 31st at 31°18′S 11°51′E. The longboat arrived at Saint Helena on 12 February after a voyage of over 1400 miles. An East Indiaman then took the survivors on to England.
