= HMS Cossack (1806) =

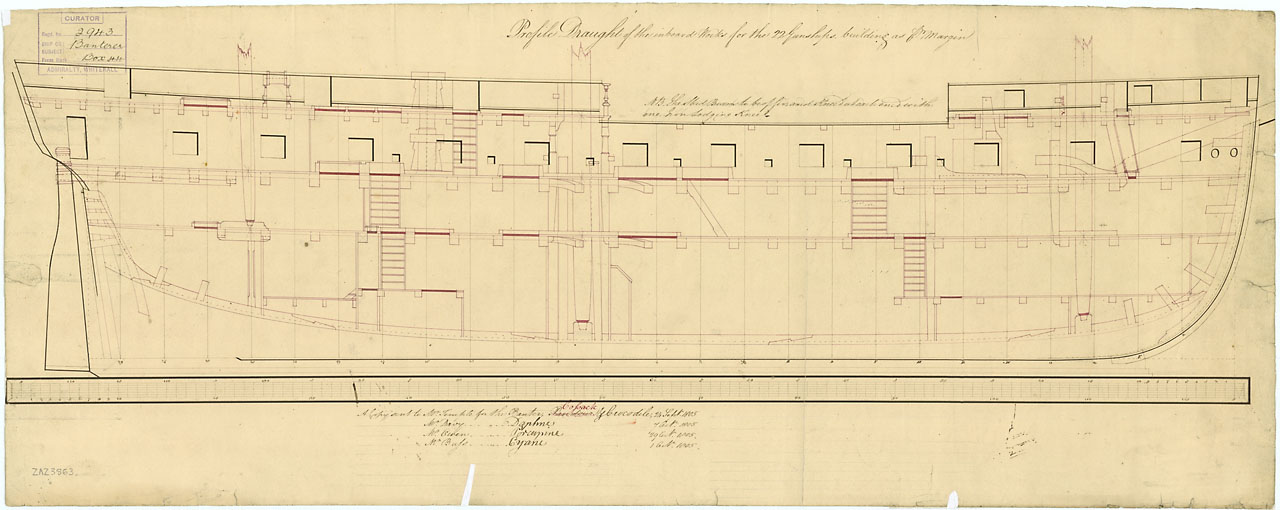
- Cossack

History

United Kingdom
- Name: HMS Cossack
- Ordered: 30 January 1805
- Builder: Simon Temple, South Shields
- Laid down: July 1805
- Launched: 24 December 1806
- Completed: 2 July 1807 at Chatham Dockyard
- Commissioned: early 1807
- Fate: Broken up in June 1816

General characteristics
- Class & type: 22-gun Banterer-class post ship
- Tons burthen: 54560/94 (bm)
- Length: 117 ft 11 1/2 in (36.0 m) (overall); 98 ft 4 1/2 in (30.0 m) (keel)
- Beam: 32 ft 3 1/2 in (9.8 m)
- Depth of hold: 10 ft 6 in (3.20 m)
- Sail plan: Full-rigged ship
- Complement: 155 (later 175)
- Armament: As ordered : Upper deck (UD): 22 × 9-pounder guns; QD: 6 × 24-pounder carronades; Fc: 2 × 6-pounder guns & 2 × 2-pounder carronades; Later: UD: 22 × 32-pounder carronades; QD: 6 × 24-pounder carronades; FC: 2 × 6-pounder guns + 2 × 24-pounder carronades

HMS Cossack was a Royal Navy Banterer-class post ship of a nominal 22 guns, launched in 1806 at South Shields, England. She was ordered in January 1805 as HMS Pandour and launched under that name but her name was altered to Cossack during 1806. She served throughout the Napoleonic War, but appears to have seen little action. She was broken up at Portsmouth in June 1816.

== Service ==
She was rated as a 22-gun ship and was intended to mount that number of long 9-pounder guns on her main deck. However, she also carried eight 24-pounder carronades and two long 6-pounders on her quarterdeck and forecastle. By the time that Captain George Digby commissioned her in early 1807, the Admiralty added two brass howitzers to her armament, while exchanging her 9-pounders for 32-pounder carronades. It also increased her complement by twenty to 175 officers, men, and boys.

Cossack was at the Battle of Copenhagen in 1807. She later shared in the prize money allotted for the capture of the Danish fleet. Cossack also shared in the proceeds of Minerva, captured on 22 August 1807. Around this time, while Cossack was serving in the Little Belt, her boats captured a brig. However, the French succeeded in capturing one of the boats involved, killing two British sailors, wounding three, and capturing some others.

In June 1808 Cossack and Comet went to St Andero to assist Spanish loyalists and bring off any British subjects. On 21 June boats from Cossack and Comet landed seamen and Royal Marines who spiked the guns of Fort St Salvador de Ano and Fort Sedra, near the town of St Andero, to prevent them falling into French hands. They also blew up two magazines, during which Captain Daly of Comet and Lieutenant Read of the Marines were injured when one of the magazines blew up.

By 29 June 1808 she was off France when she, Seine, Comet and Unicorn captured the French brig Pierre Caesar. The Admiralty took Pierre Caesar into service as Tigress. Later, on 5 August, Cossack captured the schooner Mouche in the Channel. Lloyd's List reported that "the Mouche French National Schooner of one gun, four swivels, and 24 men, from Bayonne to the Havannah, with Dispatches, arrived at Plymouth, 27 instant, Prize to the Cossack SW."

Then in late March 1809 Cossack captured Celestene. Lloyd's List reported on 31 March that the sloop of war Cossack arrived at Falmouth on 25 March with Celestine. The French ship had come from the Isles of France with a valuable cargo. Cossack captured Celestine on 23 March about 70 leagues (340 km) south west of the Lizard; in the chase Celestine had thrown 16 guns overboard.

In November 1810 Captain Thomas Garth replaced Digby. His replacement, in April 1811, was Captain Thomas Searle. In February 1812 Captain William King took command. On 7 June he sailed Cossack for Portugal.

In February 1813 Captain Francis Stanfell replaced King. Under Stanfell Cossack escorted a convoy to Jamaica and then served on the North America station where she was damaged in a storm.

In March 1814 Captain Edward Silby replaced Stanfell, and four months later Captain James Erskine Wemyss replaced Silby. One month later, in August, Captain the Honourable Robert Rodney took command. On 19 March 1815, Cossack assisted the American schooner Thistle, earning for herself a share of the salvage money. (Note: A first-class share of the prize money was worth £118 4s 3¼d; a sixth-class share, that of an ordinary seaman, was worth £1 5s 5½d.) Cossack's last commander was Captain Lord Algernon Percy, who took command in August 1815. Under Percy, Cossack served on the North American station.

== Fate ==
Cossack was broken up at Portsmouth in June 1816.
