= Northumberland (1797 ship) =

Wrecked sailboat

History

Great Britain
- Name: Northumberland
- Namesake: Northumberland
- Owner: J. Lyall
- Builder: Temple shipbuilders, South Shields
- Launched: 4 April 1797
- Fate: Wrecked 14 October 1805

General characteristics
- Tons burthen: 40646/94, or 423 (bm)
- Length: 77 ft 6 in (23.6 m)
- Beam: 31 ft 4 in (9.6 m)
- Depth of hold: 13 ft 3 in (4.0 m)
- Propulsion: Sail
- Armament: 1797:10 × 6-pounder guns; 1805:12 × 12-pounder guns "of the New Construction"

Northumberland was launched at South Shields in 1797. She made one voyage for the British East India Company (EIC). She then traded with the West Indies until she wrecked in 1805.

== Career ==
EIC voyage (1797–1799): Captain Samuel Aikman, or Andrew Aickman, or Ackman, sailed Northumberland from her berth on 25 June 1797. She left Torbay on 22 September 1797, bound for Bengal. Northumberland arrived at the Cape of Good Hope on 15 December, and left on 15 April 1798. On 25 January 1799 she was sailing "towards England". She returned to her moorings 7 February.

Lloyd's Register for 1799 showed Northumberland's trade changing from London—India to London—Jamaica.

Lloyd's Register for 1805 showed Northumberland's master changing from J. Proctor to Gibbs. Her trade is still London—Jamaica.

== Loss ==
Northumberland, Gibb, master, was totally lost on the Charleston Bar, South Carolina, on 14 October 1805; her crew was saved. She was on a voyage from Jamaica to London when she became distressed and so attempted to put into Charleston.
