= Indian (1810 ship) =

1810 ship

History

United Kingdom
- Name: Indian
- Owner: Manning & Co.
- Builder: Simon Temple, Temple shipbuilders, Jarrow
- Launched: 6 January 1810
- Fate: Wrecked December 1817

General characteristics
- Tons burthen: 522, or 522 71/94 (bm)
- Draught: 19 feet (5.8 m)
- Propulsion: Sail
- Complement: 45
- Armament: 12 × 12-pounder carronades + 12 swivel guns
- Notes: Two decks, with copper sheathing fastened with copper bolts.

Indian was a merchant ship launched at Shields in 1810. Her first voyage was to transport convicts to Australia. She then became a West Indiaman. She wrecked with heavy loss of life on 8 December 1817.

== Origin ==
There is a little ambiguity about Indian's origin. She first appeared in Lloyd's Register in 1812 with origin Whitby and launch year of 1809. This is the information that Bateson reproduces. However, the Register of Shipping for 1811 shows her origin as Shields, and her launch year as 1810. The most complete history of Whitby shipping has no listing for Indian. By contrast, Hackman has precise launch data and burthen, suggesting that his launch year of 1810 and place of Jarrow/Shields is correct. A database of vessels built on the Tyne also gives her year and location as 1810 and Jarrow.

== Career ==
Captain Andrew Barclay acquired a letter of marque on 7 June 1810. Under his command, Indian sailed from England on 18 July 1810 and arrived at Port Jackson on 16 December 1810. She embarked 200 male convicts, of whom eight died on the voyage. Indian also carried a detachment of the 73rd Regiment of Foot, who provided the guard.

Indian left Port Jackson on 24 February 1811 bound for Bengal.

Year	Master	Owner	Trade	Source & notes
1815	Barklay; J. Garbutt	Manning	London–Botany Bay	Lloyd's Register (LR)
1816	J. Garbutt; J. Ferrar	Manning; Gibbar	Liverpool–Boston	LR
1818	J. Fraser	Gibbons & Co.	London–St. Thomas	LR
1818	Davidson	Gibbons & Co.	London–St Thomas	Register of Shipping

On 3 October 1815 Indian, Garbutt, master, sailed from Liverpool for Boston. However, on 8 November she had to put into Falmouth. She had encountered heavy gales on 21 and 23 October that carried away her foremast and head of her mainmast. It also sprang her bowsprit and washed 40 tons of salt overboard.

She sailed from Falmouth on 28 February 1816, but then encountered heavy weather on 2 and 3 March. She had to put back on the 4th, having lost her fore and main topmasts, and her mainmast having been sprung. She was expected to sail again around the middle of march.

== Fate ==
On 8 December 1817 Indian was wrecked near Plouénan, Finistère, France with the loss of all on board. She was on a voyage from Portsmouth, Hampshire to St. Thomas, Virgin Islands.

One report had the loss occurring near Ushant. Lloyd's List stated that Indian was coming from Portsmouth and that she had a number of officers sailing to join "the Spanish insurgents".

A report dated 12 December, from Brest stated that 240 people had been lost. Some horses, however, were saved from the wreck. The report put the wreck at "Pontasrol". The last report had the wrecking occurring near Roscoff. It stated that some 200 persons drowned.

Lloyd's List reported on 2 January 1818, that gentlemen coming from France were reporting that there was no doubt that Indian, of London, had been wrecked. The hull, containing 58 bodies, had been saved and sold. Boats marked "Indian, of London" had been found. The masts and other parts of ships had been picked up on the coast for several days after the storm had abated.
