= Pilot (1813 ship) =

Convict transport to New South Wales

History

United Kingdom
- Name: Pilot
- Owner: 1813:Clark & Co.; 1815:S. & F. Somes & Co.
- Builder: Temple shipbuilders, Jarrow
- Launched: 7 October 1813
- Fate: Missing at sea

General characteristics
- Tons burthen: 390, 392, 39269/94, or 394 (bm)
- Length: 101 ft 6 in (30.9 m)
- Beam: 30 ft 2 in (9.2 m)
- Propulsion: Sail

Pilot was launched in 1813. She transported convicts to New South Wales in 1817. She disappeared in 1820.

== Career ==
Pilot first appeared in Lloyd's Register in 1813 with Hall, master. The 1815 volume shows her master changing to Grice, her owner to Simes, and her trade to Cowes—Batavia.

On 9 March 1817 Captain William Pexton 1817 sailed from Cork for Port Jackson, and arrived there on 29 July 1817. She had embarked 119 male convicts, but only disembarked 117, though none of whom died en route. Presumably two may have been landed before she departed England.

Pilot's surgeon-superintendent was Charles Queade. He had drawn up and issued to Captain Pexton and the commander of the guard a detailed set of instructions concerning the care and security of the convicts. When Pilot arrived at Port Jackson he passed a copy of these to Governor Lachlan Macquarie. By the mid-1820s the government itself developed and disseminated detailed regulations

After she delivered her convicts, Pilot sailed on 7 September for Hobart, and then in November for Batavia.

The Register of Shipping for 1819 showed Pilot with S. Owens, master, Somes, owner, and trade London—Ceylon.

== Fate ==
On 28 May 1820 Pilot, Owen, master, sailed from Bengal for London. She was not heard of again.
