= British Tar (1792 ship) =

History

Great Britain
- Name: British Tar
- Owner: 1792:John & James Mangles; 1810:John Pirie
- Builder: Temple shipbuilders, South Shields
- Launched: 1792
- Fate: Lost 1818

General characteristics
- Tons burthen: 320, or 326, or 343 (bm)
- Armament: 1810:8 × 18-pounder carronades; 1812:2 × 9-pounder guns + 8 × 18-pounder carronades

British Tar was launched at Shields in 1792 and made five voyages as a whaler and several as a West Indiaman. She then became a general trader. She was lost on 29 January 1818.

== Career ==
British Tar enters Lloyd's Register in 1792 with J. Fitch, master, Mangles, owner, and trade London–South Seas fisheries.

For her first whale fishing voyage British Tar sailed to Peru under the command of Jedediah Fitch. On 8 February 1793 she was at St Helena, homeward bound, and she arrived in England with 219 tuns of sperm oil.

On her second voyage she sailed in 1793 for Peru under the command of Blythe (or Thomas Bligh). She returned on 29 July 1794.

Her third voyage was again under the command of Bligh (or Blythe, or Blight), but this time he sailed her for the Pacific Ocean, where she was reported to be in August–September 1796. She returned to England on 8 May 1797.

British Tar then spent several years sailing to the West Indies. John and James Mangles still owned her and she sailed to San Domingo, but more often to Jamaica.

On 8 January 1802 Captain Innis sailed British Tar to the Galápagos Islands for her fourth whaling voyage. At some Point Captain Rowe replaced Innis. Homeward bound, she left St Helena on 4 May 1804, and arrived in England on 17 July.

Captain Charles Harrax (or Harrass, or Harrat, or Haddock), left England on 12 November 1804 and returned on 15 April 1807. This is the last whaling voyage for British Tar's that has any details. However, she may have continued whale hunting into 1810.

The Register of Shipping for 1810, in its supplemental pages, shows British Tar with Anthony, master, J. Pirie, owner, and trade London–Guadeloupe. In 1811 she underwent a large repair, and her trade became London–Newcastle.

== Fate ==
The Register of Shipping for 1818 showed British Tar with J. Pirie, owner and master, and trade London–Madeira. The entry has a line through it and the notation "Lost".

Lloyd's List reported on 3 February 1818 that a gale on 29 January 1818 had caused the total loss of British Tar, John Pirie, master, between Lymington and Christchurch, Dorset. She was on her return voyage from Sierra Leone to London. All on board, at least 14 people, were lost.

The day after British Tar was lost, the body of a four-foot long African lizard was found on the beach by Hordle Cliff, near Milford. Apparently this animal was the largest of the kind ever brought to Europe.
