= Banterer-class post ship =

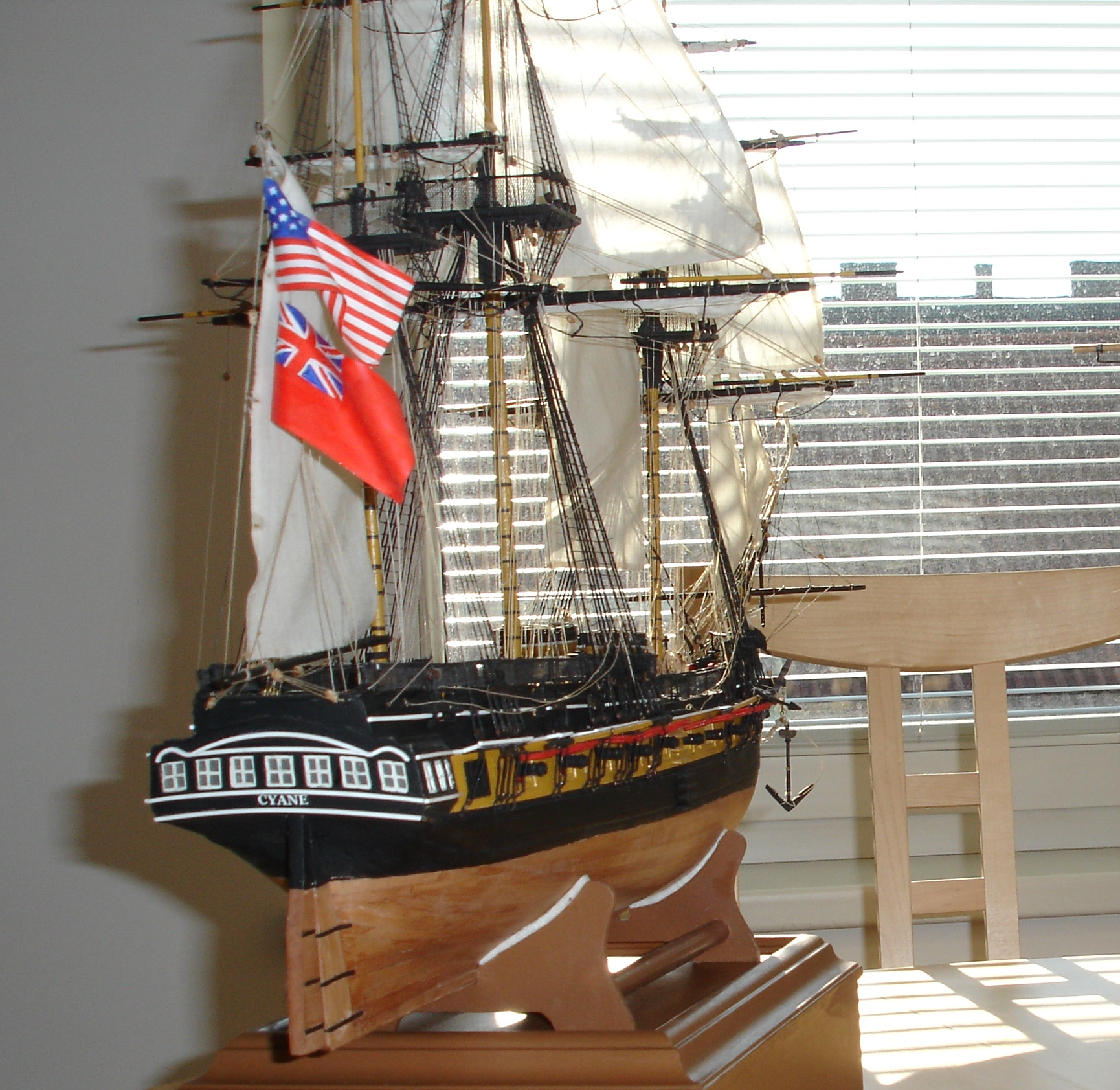
- A model of HMS Cyane showing her after her capture by USS Constitution

Class overview
- Name: Banterer-class post ships
- Operators: Royal Navy
- Completed: 6

General characteristics
- Type: Sixth-rate post ship
- Tons burthen: 537 2/94 (as designed)
- Length: 118 ft (36 m) (gundeck); 98 ft 7.125 in (30.05138 m) (keel)
- Beam: 32 ft (9.8 m)
- Depth: 10 ft 6 in (3.20 m)
- Sail plan: Full-rigged ship
- Complement: 155 (later raised to 175).
- Armament: As ordered : Upperdeck: 22 × 9-pounder guns; Quarterdeck: 6 × 24-pounder carronades; Focsle: 2 × 6-pounder guns; + 2 × 24-pounder carronades; Later: Upperdeck: 22 × 32-pounder carronades; Quarterdeck: 6 × 24-pounder carronades; Focsle: 2 × 6-pounder guns; + 2 × 24-pounder carronades

The Banterer-class sailing sixth rates were a series of six 22-gun post ships built to an 1805 design by Sir William Rule, which served in the Royal Navy during the Napoleonic War. The first four were launched in 1806 and the remaining two in 1807. One ship – the Banterer – was lost in 1808 and another – the Cyane – captured by the United States Navy in 1815; the remaining four were all deleted during 1816.

== Ships in class ==
- HMS Crocodile
  - Builder: Simon Temple, South Shields
  - Ordered: 30 January 1805
  - Laid down: June 1805
  - Launched: 19 April 1806
  - Completed: 10 August 1806 at Chatham Dockyard
  - Fate: Broken up at Portsmouth in October 1816.
- HMS Daphne
  - Builder: Robert Davy, Topsham, Exeter
  - Ordered: 30 January 1805
  - Laid down: July 1805
  - Launched: 2 July 1806
  - Completed: 4 October 1806 at Plymouth Dockyard
  - Fate: Sold to be broken up at Deptford in February 1816, but became mercantile Daphne; last listed in 1823
- HMS Cossack
  - Builder: Simon Temple, South Shields
  - Ordered: 30 January 1805
  - Laid down: July 1805
  - Launched: 24 December 1806
  - Completed: 2 July 1807 at Chatham Dockyard
  - Fate: Broken up at Portsmouth in June 1816.
- HMS Cyane
  - Builder: John Bass, Topsham, Exeter
  - Ordered: 30 January 1805
  - Laid down: August 1805
  - Launched: 14 October 1806
  - Completed: 13 July 1807 at Plymouth Dockyard
  - Fate: Captured by USS Constitution off Madeira on 20 February 1815.
- HMS Banterer
  - Builder: Simon Temple, South Shields
  - Ordered: 30 January 1805
  - Laid down: August 1805
  - Launched: 24 February 1807
  - Completed: 12 July 1807 at Chatham Dockyard
  - Fate: Wrecked in the Saint Lawrence River in October 1808.
- HMS Porcupine
  - Builder: Thomas Owen, Topsham, Exeter
  - Ordered: 30 January 1805
  - Laid down: September 1805
  - Launched: 26 January 1807
  - Completed: 22 June 1807 at Plymouth Dockyard
  - Fate: Sold to be broken up at Portsmouth in April 1816.
