= HMS Banterer (1807) =

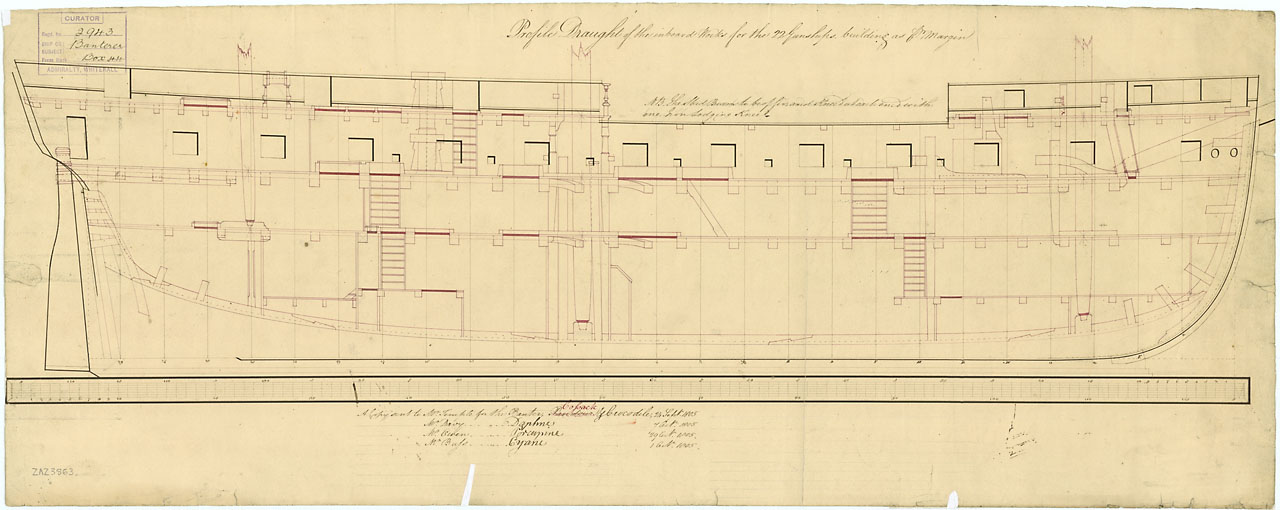
- Banterer

History

United Kingdom
- Name: HMS Banter
- Ordered: 30 January 1805
- Renamed: HMS Banterer 9 August 1805
- Builder: Temple shipbuilders, South Shields
- Laid down: August 1805
- Launched: 24 February 1807
- Completed: 12 July 1807
- Commissioned: May 1807
- Out of service: Wrecked 29 October 1808

General characteristics
- Class & type: 24-gun Banterer-class sixth-rate post-ship
- Tons burthen: 53774/94 (bm)
- Length: 118 ft 0 in (36.0 m) (overall); 98 ft 5.75 in (30.0 m) (keel)
- Beam: 32 ft 0.5 in (9.8 m)
- Depth of hold: 10 ft 6 in (3.20 m)
- Sail plan: Full-rigged ship
- Complement: 155 (later 175)
- Armament: As ordered : Upperdeck (UD): 22 × 9-pounder guns; QD: 6 × 24-pounder carronades; Fc: 2 × 6-pounder guns & 2 × 24-pounder carronades; Later: UD: 22 × 32-pounder carronades; QD: 6 × 24-pounder carronades; Fc: 2 × 6-pounder guns & 2 × 24-pounder carronades

HMS Banterer was a Royal Navy Banterer-class sixth-rate post-ship of 24 guns, built between 1805 and 1807 at South Shields, England. She was ordered in January 1805 as HMS Banter but her name was lengthened to Banterer on 9 August 1805.

== Design and construction ==
Banterer was rated as a 24-gun ship and was intended to mount that number of long 9-pounder guns on her main deck. However she also carried eight 24-pounder carronades and two long 6-pounders on her quarterdeck and forecastle. By the time that Captain Alexander Cary took command in May 1807, the Admiralty added two brass howitzers to her armament, while exchanging her 9-pounders for 32-pounder carronades. Her complement was increased by 20 to 175 officers, men, and boys.

Banterer was laid down in August 1805 and launched on 24 February 1807. She was completed on 12 July 1807.

== Service history ==
Captain Alexander Shippard (or Sheppard) commissioned Banterer in May 1807. Later that year, Banterer participated in the Battle of Copenhagen in August and September 1807.

Subsequently, Banterer returned to England. She then sailed with a convoy for Halifax, Nova Scotia, in British North America on 13 February 1808. On 29 October 1808, she was wrecked in the Saint Lawrence River in British North America near Point Mille Vache.

The court-martial for Sheppard and his officers and crew took place aboard the corvette Tourtourelle between 28 and 30 January 1809 in St. George's Harbour at Bermuda. The court martial dismissed Lieutenant Stephen C. McCurdy from the Royal Navy for having neglected his responsibilities during the third watch. It also severely reprimanded the acting master, Robert Clegram, for culpable negligence in failing to pass on to the officer who relieved him Sheppard's instructions concerning certain safety precautions. The court martial acquitted Sheppard, his other officers and crew, and the pilot of the loss.
