= HMS Porcupine (1807) =

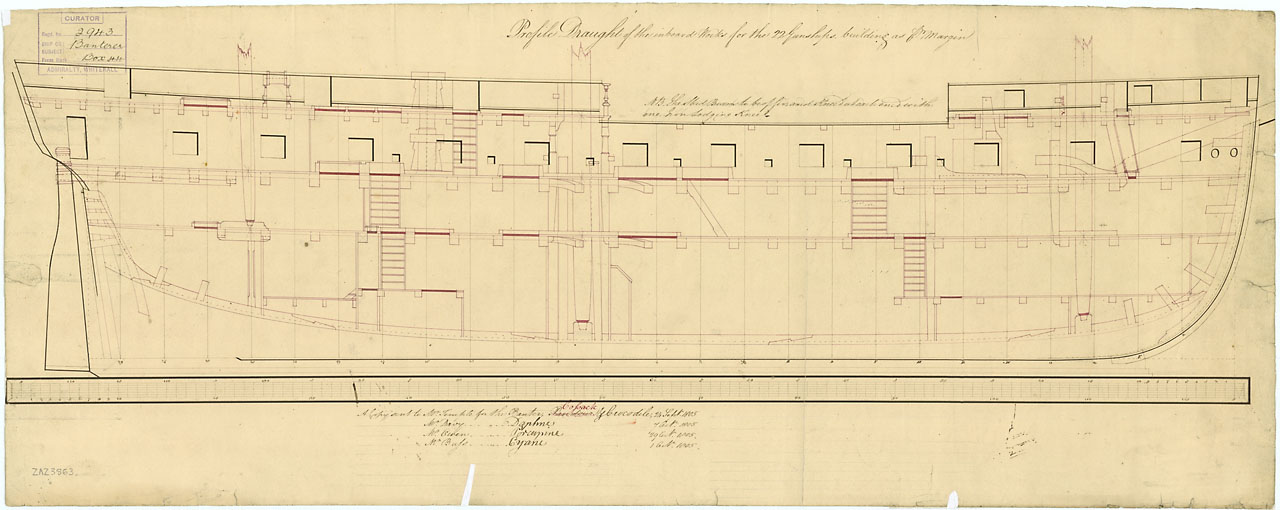
- Porcupine

History

United Kingdom
- Name: HMS Porcupine
- Ordered: 30 January 1805
- Builder: Thomas Owen, Topsham, Exeter
- Laid down: September 1805
- Launched: 26 January 1807
- Completed: 22 June 1807 at Plymouth Dockyard
- Commissioned: March 1807
- Out of service: Sold 18 April 1816
- Honours and awards: Naval General Service Medal with clasp "10 July Boat Service 1808"

United Kingdom
- Acquired: April 1818 by purchase
- Renamed: Windsor Castle
- Fate: Sold 1826 for breaking up

General characteristics
- Class & type: Banterer-class post ship
- Tons burthen: 55968/94, or 538, or 560 (bm)
- Length: 118 ft 0 5/8 in (36.0 m) (overall); 98 ft 7 3/4 in (30.1 m) (keel)
- Beam: 32 ft 0 1/4 in (9.8 m)
- Depth of hold: 10 ft 6 in (3.20 m)
- Sail plan: Full-rigged ship
- Complement: 155 (later 175)
- Armament: As ordered: Upper deck (UD): 22 × 9-pounder guns; QD: 6 × 24-pounder carronades; Fc: 2 × 6-pounder guns & 2 × 24-pounder carronades; Later: UD: 22 × 32-pounder carronades; QD: 6 × 24-pounder carronades; Fc: 2 × 6-pounder bow chasers + 2 × 24-pounder carronades

HMS Porcupine was a Royal Navy Banterer-class post ship of 24 guns, launched in 1807. She served extensively and relatively independently in the Adriatic and the Western Mediterranean during the Napoleonic Wars, with her boats performing many cutting out expeditions, one of which earned for her crew the Naval General Service Medal. She was sold for breaking up in 1816 but instead became the mercantile Windsor Castle. She was finally sold for breaking up in 1826 at Mauritius.

== Design ==
Porcupine was rated a 24-gun ship and the original plan was that she would mount that number of long 9-pounder guns on her main deck plus two 6-pounder guns on her forecastle. She also carried ten 24-pounder carronades on her quarterdeck and forecastle. By the time that Captain Henry Duncan commissioned her in March 1807, the Admiralty had added two brass howitzers to her armament, while exchanging her 9-pounders for 32-pounder carronades. Her complement was increased by twenty to 175 officers, men and boys.

== Service ==
Porcupine entered service in March 1807, operating in the Mediterranean Fleet during the Napoleonic Wars under the command of Captain Henry Duncan. Detached to serve on independent command in the Adriatic Campaign, Porcupine fought numerous minor actions with shore batteries and coastal merchant ships.

=== Adriatic ===
On 23 September 1807, she captured Fortuna. Then on 7 October Porcupine chased a trabaccolo into the harbour of Zupaino on Šipan (Giuppana), the largest of the Elaphiti Islands. That evening Duncan sent his boats, under the command of Lieutenant George Price, with Lieutenant Francis Smith, into the harbour where they captured and brought out the trabaccolo, which was the Venetian gunboat Safo. She was armed with a 24-pounder gun and some swivel guns, and had a crew of some 50 men, all under the command of enseigne de vaisseau Anthonio Ghega. She was well moored to the shore and was expecting an attack. Even so, once the British arrived, most of the crew jumped overboard. Safo belonged to a division of gunboats deployed to protect the coast and had been sent out from Ragusa (Dubrovnik) three days earlier. Also, before entering the harbour, the British captured a guard boat with one 4-pounder swivel gun. Despite the resistance, Porcupine had only two men wounded. (Note: Head money was paid in February 1829. A first-class share was worth £68 18s 11¼d; a fifth-class share, that of an able seaman, was worth 7s 4¼d.)

Between 23 September and 23 November, Porcupine captured some 40 enemy vessels, most of which were carrying grain and wine between Ragusa and Catero (Kotor). Duncan received intelligence that the French were going to fortify the island of Curzola. He therefore kept Porcupine between the island and Ragusa. On 27 November Lieutenant Price in the cutter captured two small vessels sailing from Ragusa; small arms fire from the shore wounded one man. Two days later Price went into the harbour of Zuliano where he destroyed several small vessels and wine in warehouses that was intended for French troops. He brought out the only vessel afloat, a trabaccolo carrying a cargo of wool. As he was leaving the port another trabaccolo approached and before Porcupine could intercept it, Price had captured it too. She was sailing from Ragusa to Curzola with military stores, including two 6½" brass mortars, two 5½" brass howitzers, four new carriages for 18-pounder guns, together with material for constructing a shore battery as well as shot and shell. Duncan was able to get the guns and most of the stores on to Porcupine before a gale came up, which forced him to destroy the two trabaccolos.

Porcupine's next exploit occurred on 7 January 1808. After a chase of eight hours, Porcupine captured the French transport Saint Nicolo. She was armed with two guns, had a crew of 16 sailors, and also had on board 31 soldiers from the 6th Regiment of the Line. She was 36 hours out of Tarento. Finding out from the prize that another vessel had left four hour earlier, Duncan set out to find her in the channel between Paxos and Corfu. He was successful in intercepting his quarry, which turned out to be Madonna del Carmine. She was armed with six guns, had a crew of 20 men, and was carrying 33 soldiers, also from the 6th Regiment. Both vessels were on their first voyage and were carrying cargoes of grain and gunpowder for the garrison at Corfu.

=== Western Mediterranean ===
Next, Duncan was ordered to cruise in the Western Mediterranean off Naples and continued his successful operations against coastal shipping. Following the outbreak of the Peninsular War, Duncan was ordered to take the Duke of Orléans to Cádiz. Duncan refused and was subject to disparaging comments about his age, although he was later proven correct in his assessment. In June 1808, Robert Elliott was appointed to replace Duncan; however, some months elapsed before he was able to do so.

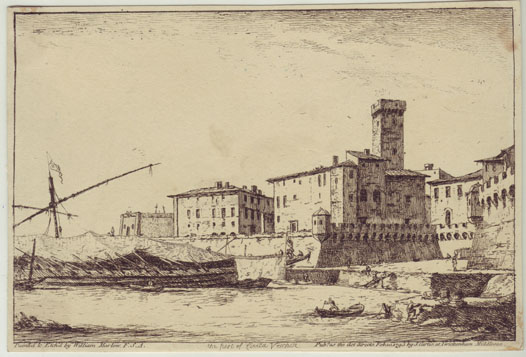
Civitavecchia in 1795, etching by William Marlow

On 23 June a French vessel exited Civitavechia and tried to elude Porcupine. However, Porcupine succeeded in running her ashore between two towers, each armed with two cannons. Lieutenant Price took in the boats and succeeded in destroying her, without suffering any casualties and despite heavy fire from the towers. The vessel was from Ischia and was sailing with a cargo of wine.

Two days later, Porcupine was off the island of Montecristo when a daylight she encountered a French schooner. After an 11-hour chase, Porcupine succeeded in capturing her about four leagues south of Bastia. The French crew abandoned their vessel and escaped before Porcupine could take possession of her. She was Nouvelle Enterprise, three weeks old, pierced for 14 guns but only mounting six. She was 24 hours out of Leghorn and was carrying bale goods for Scala Nova in Turkey.

However, on 9 July Duncan spotted an enemy merchant vessel, and her escorts, two gunboats, each armed with a 24-pounder gun, all sailing along the coast. Porcupine was becalmed off Monte Circello, Romania so Duncan sent in her boats. After rowing eight hours in the heat, the boats succeeded in driving the merchant vessel on shore and the gunboats to take shelter under the guns of two shore batteries at Port d'Anzo (Anzio). Three more French vessels arrived and succeeded in getting into the harbour. One of the vessels was a large polacca of six guns, and she anchored a little further out than the other vessels. That evening Duncan sent in the boats again to cut her out. The polacca, which had a crew of some 20-30 men, was expecting an attack and had tied her to the beach. French soldiers were on the beach, and the polacca was within close range of the batteries, a tower, and the gunboats. Still, the British succeeded in capturing her and getting her out to sea, though it took them about an hour and twenty minutes to do so. The polacca had been sailing from Hieres Bay to Naples with a cargo of salt. In the attack, the British suffered eight men wounded, including Lieutenant Price, who was severely injured in his head and leg. He received a promotion to commander for this and earlier achievements in some 30 boat actions. In 1847 the Admiralty issued the Naval General Service Medal with clasp "10 July Boat Service 1808" to all surviving claimants from the action.

On 10 July, Porcupine captured Madonna de Rosario. Eleven days later, Porcupine ran a French polacca ashore near Monte Circello. Lieutenant Smith took in the boats and destroyed the polacca, which was of about 200 tons burthen (bm) and which had been carrying a cargo of iron hoops and staves. The cutting out expedition suffered no casualties though it came under fire from a tower with two guns located no more than a pistol-shot away.

After dark on 8 August, Porcupine, still under the command of Duncan, had her cutter and jolly boat under Lieutenant Francis Smith cut out a vessel she had run ashore on the island of Pianosa. The cutting out party was successful, bringing out Concepcion, which was armed with four guns. She had been lying within 30 yards of a tower and a shore battery of six guns. She was also defended by soldiers on the beach and one of her guns which she had landed. She had been carrying bale goods from Genoa to Cyprus. The action cost Porcupine one man killed, and a lieutenant and eight men severely wounded, with three men later dying of their wounds. Smith might have received a promotion for this and prior actions but Duncan's letter to Admiral Collingwood was lost and the duplicate arrived only after Collingwood had died in March 1810.

== Channel ==
By 14 July 1810, Elliot had assumed command of Porcupine. On that day the sailing master for Porcupine impressed an American sailor, Isaac Clark, from Jane out of Norfolk, Virginia. Elliott tore up the seaman's protection (a document attesting to his being an American citizen and so exempt from British impressment), declaring the man an Englishman. Over the next few weeks Elliott had Clark whipped three times (each whipping consisting of 24 lashes) when Clark refused to go on duty, and held in irons on bread and water. After nine weeks Clark surrendered. He served on Porcupine for two and a half years, being wounded in an engagement with a French frigate. Eventually he was transferred to Impregnable and then to a hospital due to ongoing problems with his wound. There the American consul was able to get him released and discharged, a copy of the protection having been forwarded from Salem, Massachusetts. Clark further testified that there were seven Americans aboard Porcupine, three of whom had agreed to serve.

In 1811, Porcupine was ordered to sail to Brazil and returned to Portsmouth. She was at Portsmouth on 31 July 1812 when the British authorities seized the American ships there and at Spithead on the outbreak of the War of 1812. She therefore shared, with numerous other vessels, in the subsequent prize money for these vessels: Belleville, Aeos, Janus, Ganges, and Leonidas.

Porcupine later joined the squadron off Bordeaux, assisting the British advance during the Peninsular War. Porcupine, while under command of Captain John Goode and carrying the flag of Rear-Admiral Charles Penrose, through early 1814 operated against French coastal positions and squadrons.

On the morning of 23 February 1814, she and the other vessels of Penrose's flotilla assisted the British Army in its crossing of the Ardour river, near Bayonne. In this service two of Porcupine's seamen drowned, as did some others from the flotilla when boats overturned crossing the bar on the coast.

On 2 April Captain Goode, who had ascended the Gironde above Pouillac, sent Porcupine's boats, under the orders of Lieutenant Robert Graham Dunlop, to pursue a French flotilla that was proceeding down from Blaye to Tallemont. As the British boats approached them, the French flotilla ran on shore under the cover of about 200 troops from Blaye who lined the beach. Dunlop landed with a party of seamen and marines and drove the French off. The landing party remained until the tide allowed them to take away most of the French vessels. The British captured a gun-brig, six gun-boats, one armed schooner, three chasse-marées, and an imperial barge, and burned a gun-brig, two gun-boats, and a chasse-marée. Total British casualties were two seamen missing and 14 seamen and marines wounded.

Porcupine returned to Plymouth from Bordeaux on 6 September 1814. On 4 November she sailed to the Coast of Africa and thence to the Cape of Good Hope before coming back to Sierra Leone on 29 April 1815.

On 16 October 1815 Porcupine arrived at Deal and sailed for the river to be paid off. She arrived at Woolwich on 6 November and was paid off and laid up in ordinary. Although there were some plans for her to serve on the South America station, she never sailed again for the Royal Navy. Porcupine was sold at Woolwich Dockyard in April 1816 for breaking up.

== Merchantman and loss ==
However, rather than breaking her up, J. Short & Co., purchased her, converted her to a merchantman and renamed her Windsor Castle. Her owners traded with India under a license from the British East India Company The supplemental pages for Lloyd's Register for 1816 show her master as "Hornblower", and her trade as London-India. In 1818 her master was T. Hoggart and her trade was London-Bengal.

On 1 June 1826, she put into Mauritius leaking badly. There she was surveyed, condemned as a constructive total loss, and sold for breaking up. Prince Regent, Lamb, master, was engaged to take Windsor Castle's cargo.

== Post script ==
In January 1819, the London Gazette reported that Parliament had voted a grant to all those who had served under the command of Lord Viscount Keith in 1812, between 1812 and 1814, and in the Gironde. Porcupine was listed among the vessels that had served under Keith in 1813 and 1814. (Note: The money was paid in three tranches. For someone participating in the first through third tranches, a first-class share was worth £256 5s 9d; a sixth-class share was worth £4 6s 10d. For someone participating only in the second and third tranches a first-class share was worth £202 6s 8d; a sixth-class share was worth £5 0s 5d.) She had also served under Kieth in the Gironde. (Note: The sum of the two tranches of payment for that service was £272 8s 5d for a first-class share; the amount for a sixth-class share was £3 3s 5d.)
