= Prince Regent (1811 Rochester ship) =

UK merchant ship and convict transport (1811–1863)

History

United Kingdom
- Name: Prince Regent
- Namesake: George IV, who became Prince Regent in 1811
- Builder: John Pelham, Frindsbury, Rochester (Note: Both prior to building Prince Regent and after, Pelham built Cruizer-class brig-sloops for Royal Navy. The vessels of this class were of the same burthen as Prince Regent, and several became whalers after the Navy disposed of them.)
- Launched: 25 April 1811
- Fate: Grounded March 1863 and grounded April

General characteristics
- Tons burthen: 382, or 39248/94, or 395 (bm)
- Armament: 18 × 12-pounder carronades (1811)

Prince Regent was launched at Rochester in 1811. She initially traded with the West Indies and the Mediterranean. From 1814 on she started trading with the Indian Ocean and India, sailing under a licence from the British East India Company (EIC). In 1820–1821 she transported convicts from Ireland to New South Wales. She continued to trade with Australia. In 1841–1842 she made a second voyage transporting convicts from Ireland, this time to Hobart. In about 1843 new owners shifted her home port to Hull. From there she traded with Quebec, the Baltic, Aden, and perhaps elsewhere. In 1863 she was at Alicante, Spain where she grounded. She was condemned as not worth repairing.

== Career ==
Prince Regent first appeared in Lloyd's Register in 1811.

Year	Master	Owner	Trade	Source
1811	Heseldine	Middleton	London–Jamaica	LR
1812	Heseldine; C.Kerr	Middleton; Buckle & Co.	London–Jamaica	LR
1813	C.Kerr	Buckle & Co.	London–Malta	LR
1815	C.Kerr	Buckle & Co.	London–CGH	LR

In 1813 the British East India Company (EIC) had lost its monopoly on the trade between India and Britain. British ships were then free to sail to India or the Indian Ocean under a licence from the EIC. Prince Regent's owners applied for a licence to sail to certain ports in the East Indies under the provisions for whalers. They applied on 3 October 1815 and received the licence on 8 October.

On 7 May 1814, Prince Regent, Kerr, master, sailed from Gravesend, Kent for Isle of France (Mauritius). Three days later she sailed from Portsmouth with the fleet under convoy by Achille. On 7 July Prince Regent, Kerr, master, was at 15°17′S 26°2′W, on her way to Île de France. On 6 August she was at the Cape of Good Hope. On 19 February 1815 Prince Regent, Kerr, master, sailed from Batavia. On 8 August she was off Plymouth.

On 22 November 1815, Prince Regent, Clifford, master, sailed for India. On 31 December she was at 4°58′N 19°47′W. On 18 March 1816 she arrived at Isle of France (Mauritius). On 11 December she was at St Helena, from Mauritius, and sailed for England. On 2 February 1817 she was at Deal, from Bengal.

On 29 August 1817, she was at Gravesend, Prince Regent, Clifford, master, sailed for Bengal. On her way she stopped at Madeira. On 14 December she had reached the Cape. On 11 May 1818 she sailed from Bengal and on 8 October she was off Portsmouth; by 12 October she was at Gravesend.

Year	Master	Owner	Trade	Source
1818	F.Clifford	Buckle & Co.	London–Calcutta	LR
1820	J.Clifford	Buckle & Co.	London–Calcutta	RS
1821	J.Clifford	Buckle & Co.	London–New South Wales	RS

On 16 January 1820 Prince Regent, Clifford, master, arrived at the Cape from Bombay. On 6 April she was off Portsmouth.

1st convict voyage (1820–1821): Captain Francis Clifford sailed from Cork on 19 September 1820. Prince Regent arrived at Port Jackson on 9 January 1821. She had embarked 144 male convicts, none of whom died on the voyage. A detachment of the 1st Foot (Royals) provided the guard. On 14 February Prince Regent sailed for Batavia, which she reached. She sailed from Batavia on 8 August and was at Anjer Roads four days later. Prince Regent (late Clifford) arrived at Gravesend in December.

Year	Master	Owner	Trade	Source
1822	F.Clifford; Lamb	Buckle & Co.	London–New South Wales; London–Madras	LR
1824	Lamb	Buckle & Co.	London	LR; good repair 1823

On 29 January 1824 Prince Regent, W.B.Lambe, master, sailed from England with 55 passengers for Hobart and Sydney. She touched at Bahia and arrived at Hobart on 2 July. On 31 July she sailed for Port Jackson. On 11 November she sailed for London.

Year	Master	Owner	Trade	Source
1826	Lamb	Buckle & Co.	London–V.D.L.	LR; good repair 1823

Prince Regent, [William Buchanan] Lamb, master, sailed for Van Diemen's Land from Cowes on 22 October 1825. She touched at Madeira, which she left on 6 November, and arrived at Hobart on 1 March 1826. Her cargo included 250 Merino sheep, under the care of three German shepherds. Thirty of the sheep died on the voyage. The sheep were mostly intended for the Australian Company at Sydney. On 17 March she sailed for Sydney. On 22 April she sailed for Mauritius.

On 1 June 1826, Windsor Castle put into Mauritius leaking badly. There she was surveyed, condemned as a constructive total loss, and sold for breaking up. Prince Regent, Lamb, master, was engaged to take Windsor Castle's cargo.

Year	Master	Owner	Trade	Source & notes
1828	Lamb; C.Mallard	Buckle & Co.	London–New South Wales	LR; good repair 1823, new deck and some repairs 1827
1833	Aitkin	Buckle & Co.	London–New South Wales	LR; good repair 1823, new deck and some repairs 1827
1839	Aitkin	Buckle & Co.	London	LR; damages repaired 1838 and some repairs 1839
1841	Aitkin; Bartlett	Buckle & Co. J.Somes	London; London–Sydney	LR; damages repaired 1838 and some repairs 1839

2nd convict voyage (1841–1842): Captain J.T.Barclay sailed from Gravesend on 1 July 1841, bound for Dublin to embark convicts for Hobart. Before leaving, he had embarked the guard for the voyage, two officers and 39 other ranks from the 96th Regiment of Foot. Prince Regent arrived at Kingstown and there embarked 181 male convicts. On 7 August she sailed for Hobart. She reached the Cape of Good Hope on 10 November. In addition to re-provisioning and taking on water, she also embarked five military convicts. She left the Cape on 21 November and arrived at Hobart on 2 January 1842. She arrived with 182 convicts, three having died on the Journey. On 28 January she sailed in ballast for Singapore.

Year	Master	Owner	Trade	Source & notes
1843	Chambers	Chambers	Hull–Quebec	LR; large repairs 1844, & white and black strakes
1848	Chambers	Hill & Co.	Hull–America; Hull–Quebec	LR; damages repaired 1846
1850	Martin	Hill & Co.	Hull–Quebec	LR; large repairs 1844 and some repairs 1849
1851	Warton	Hill & Co.	Hull–Quebec	LR; large repairs 1844 and some repairs 1849
1853	Martin	Hill & Co.	Hull–Quebec	LR; large repairs 1844, part new deck 1849, some repairs 1849, 1852, & 1853, and part new wales and topsides 1853
1856	J.Carrick	Hill & Co.	Hull–Quebec	LR; large repairs 1844, part new deck 1849, some repairs 1853, 1854, & 1856, and part new wales and topsides 1853
1858	J.Carrick	Hill & Co.		LR
1859	J.Carrick	Hill & Co.	Hull–Baltic	LR; large repairs 1844, part new deck 1849, some repairs 1854, & 1856, part new wales and topsides 1853, & damages repaired 1856

On 9 August 1859, Captain John Carrick, of Prince Regent, of Hull, died at the Cape. He was the last son of the late Captain John Carrick. She was on a voyage to Aden.

Year	Master	Owner	Trade	Source & notes
1862	J.Carrick; Elleson	Hill & Co.	Hull	LR; large repairs 1844, part new deck 1849, some repairs 1853, 1856, & 1861, part new wales and topsides 1853

== Fate ==
Prince Regent, Ellison, master, on 23 March 1863 ran aground and was damaged at Alicante, Spain. She was on a voyage from Hull. She was refloated on 7 April and found to be severely leaky. Prince Regent was consequently condemned.

Prince Regent's entry in the 1863 volume of Lloyd's Register bears the annotation "LOST".
