= Lord Cathcart (1807 Shields ship) =

History

United Kingdom
- Name: Lord Cathcart
- Namesake: William Cathcart, 1st Earl Cathcart.
- Builder: Temple shipbuilders, South Shields
- Launched: 1807
- Fate: Wrecked October 1825

General characteristics
- Tons burthen: 490, or 491 (bm)

Lord Cathcart was launched at Shields in 1807. Between 1816 and 1919 she traded with the Cape of Good Hope. She experienced two notable events, her detention in Chile in 1822 and her wrecking in 1825.

== Career ==
Lord Cathcart entered Lloyd's Register (LR) in 1808 with Richardson, master, Bulmer & Co., owners, and trade London transport.

The Register of Shipping reports the following information:

Year	Master	Owner	Trade
1810	Richardson	Bulmer & Co.	London transport
1815	G.Allen; Tolbeck	Bulmer & Co.	Portsmouth transport
1816	Tolbert; Dalby	Bulmer & Co.	London–Bengal; London–Cape of Good Hope
1817			Not published
1818	Tolbert	Bulmer & Co.	London–Cape of Good Hope
1819	Tolbert	Bulmer & Co.	London–Cape of Good Hope
1820	Watson	Blanchard	London–Cadiz

On 23 June 1820, Lord Cathcart, Watson, master, arrived at Quebec after a 40-day voyage from Cadiz.

Year	Master	Owner	Trade
1821	Watson	Blanchard	London–Rio de Janeiro
1822	Watson	Blanchard	London–Rio de Janeiro

On 15 December 1820, Lord Cathcart, Watson, master, arrived at Rio de Janeiro from London. On 7 January 1821 she sailed from Rio de Janeiro for Lima.

Detention: Lloyd's List on 2 October 1821 reported a letter dated Rio de Janeiro, 23 July. It stated that Lord Cochrane had landed 500 men at Arica and captured the town. The troops had also seized four vessels there: Lord Cathcart, Columbia, Joseph, and Robert. Lord Cathcart and Columbia had already landed their cargoes. A later report confirmed that Lord Cathcart, Watson, master, of and from London, was among the vessels seized at Arica. Lord Cathcart arrived at Valparaíso on 24 June and was detained there.

Cochrane apparently released Lord Cathcart. In a letter dated 2 October, Valparaíso, Watson reported that she had again been detained, at Valparaíso, "in consequence of dispatches received from Lord Cochrane." On 18 May 22, at Valparaíso, Lord Cathcart's cargo was condemned as Spanish property. Cochrane ordered Lord Cathcart to follow him to Ilo, intending to detain her, but did not put any men aboard her. Watson took advantage of the night to sail off.

Lloyd's Register for 1824 showed Lord Cathcart's master changing from D. Dipnall to M'Dougal. Her owner was Staniforth, and her trade Plymouth–Odessa.

Lloyd's List reported on 10 August 1824 that Lord Cathcart, M'Dougal, master, had arrived at Liverpool from Miramichi. On 1 August she had run afoul of a large ship off Cape Clear Island. Lord Cathcart had lost her foreyard and jib-boom, and had suffered other damage.

== Fate ==
Mearns, Nichols, master, arrived at Greenock on 17 November 1825. She had left Miramichi, New Brunswick, on 27 October and she brought the news that three vessels had been lost on 18 October on West Point, Prince Edward Island. The three were:

- Lord Cathcart, M'Dougal, sailing from Miramichi to the Clyde;
- Hamlet, Christie, master; and,
- Protector, Robson, master, sailing from Clyde to Miramichi.

All the crews were saved.
