= Lord Cathcart (1807 Hull ship) =

History

United Kingdom
- Name: Lord Cathcart
- Namesake: William Cathcart, 1st Earl Cathcart.
- Launched: 1807, Hull
- Fate: Wrecked 12 January 1820

General characteristics
- Tons burthen: 362 (bm)
- Complement: 17 at loss
- Armament: 8 × 6-pounder guns + 2 × 12-pounder carronades (1810)

Lord Cathcart was launched at Hull in 1807. She was a West Indiaman but made one voyage to India, sailing under a licence from the British East India Company. She foundered in 1820 after striking a rock at Pelagosa Island in the Adriatic Sea.

== Career ==
Lord Cathcart entered Lloyd's Register in 1808 with J. Lane, master, Foster & Co., owner, and trade Hull–Jamaica.

The Register of Shipping reports the following information:

Year	Master	Owner	Trade
1810	Beattie	R. Moxon	London–Jamaica
1815	W. Batteny	R. Moxon	Liverpool–Jamaica
1816	Rammer; Fairburn	Moxon	Liverpool–San Domingo; London–Jamaica
1817			Not published

In 1813 the EIC had lost its monopoly on the trade between India and Britain. British ships were then free to sail to India or the Indian Ocean under a license from the EIC.

Year	Master	Owner	Trade
1818	J. Farrant	R. Moxon	London–Calcutta
1819	J. Farrant	R. Moxon	London–Calcutta
1820	J. Farrant	R. Moxon	London–Calcutta

== Fate ==
Lord Cathcart was sailing from Fiume to England when she sank within 15 minutes after striking a rock 5 nautical miles (9.3 km) east north east of Pelagosa Island, Kingdom of the Two Sicilies, on 12 January 1820 in the Adriatic Sea, north of Gargano. Captain J. Ferrand, the carpenter, and three seamen drowned. The Chief Officer and eleven of the crew reached Manfredonia after two days and nights in her boats.
