= Lord Cathcart (1808 ship) =

History

United Kingdom
- Name: Lord Cathcart
- Namesake: William Cathcart, 1st Earl Cathcart.
- Builder: Temple shipbuilders, Jarrow
- Launched: 12 October 1808
- Fate: Wrecked April 1821

General characteristics
- Tons burthen: 44173/94, or 44858/94 (bm)
- Armament: 8 × 18-pounder carronades (1810)

Lord Cathcart was launched at Jarrow in 1808. Between 1815 and 1819 she traded with the East Indies and India. She was trading with Quebec when she foundered in 1821 in the Atlantic.

== Career ==
Lord Cathcart entered the Register of Shipping in 1809 with West, master, T&R Brown, owner, and trade London transport.

The Register of Shipping reports the following information:

Year	Master	Owner	Trade
1810	D. West	T&R Brown	London transport
1815	D. West; Coward	T&R Brown	London transport
1816	Coward; Ross	T&R Brown	London transport London–Java

In 1813 the British East India Company (EIC) had lost its monopoly on the trade between India and Britain. British ships were then free to sail to India or the Indian Ocean under a licence from the EIC. Lord Cathcart's owners applied for a licence on 13 December 1815 and received it that same day.

Captain Ross sailed Lord Cathcart to Calcutta. On Ross's return to Britain, Captain Brown replaced Ross.

Year	Master	Owner	Trade
1817			Not published
1818	Ross; S. Brown	T&R Brown	London–Bombay; London–India
1819	S. Brown	T&R Brown	London–India
1820	S. Brown	T&R Brown	London–Quebec
1821	S. Brown; Banks	T&R Brown	London–Quebec
1822	Banks	T&R Brown	London–Quebec

== Fate ==
On 29 April 1821 as Lord Cathcart, Banks, master, was sailing from London to Quebec, a heavy sea struck her. She became so leaky her crew abandoned Lord Cathcart in a sinking condition in position 45°38′N 36°47′W. Neptune, of Jersey, was bound to Newfoundland when she picked up the crew from their boats the next day. On 11 May Neptune put the crew on Traveller, which was coming from Jamaica; Traveller took the crew to Leith.
