= List of shipwrecks in 1807 =

The list of shipwrecks in 1807 includes ships sunk, wrecked or otherwise lost during 1807.

table of contents
1807
Jan	Feb	Mar	Apr
May	Jun	Jul	Aug
Sep	Oct	Nov	Dec
Unknown date

== January ==
=== 1 January ===
List of shipwrecks: 1 January 1807
Ship	State	Description
Industry	United Kingdom	The ship sank on the North Bank, in the Irish Sea off Wexford. She was on a voyage from Glasgow, Renfrewshire, to Waterford.

=== 4 January ===
List of shipwrecks: 4 January 1807
Ship	State	Description
Birmingham	United Kingdom	The ship was lost near Calais, France. She was on a voyage from Amsterdam, North Holland, Kingdom of Holland to St. Ubes, Spain.
HMS Nautilus	Royal Navy	The sloop-of-war was wrecked on Antikythera, Greece with the loss of 62 of the 122 people on board.

=== 9 January ===
List of shipwrecks: 9 January 1807
Ship	State	Description
Johanna Elizabeth	Sweden	The galiot was wrecked off Abbotsbury, Dorset, United Kingdom with the loss of two of her eight crew. She was on a voyage from St Martin's, Isles of Scilly, Great Britain to Bergen, Norway.
Merry Quaker	United Kingdom	The ship was wrecked on the Colorados, off the coast of Cuba. She was on a voyage from Jamaica to New York, United States.

=== 12 January ===
List of shipwrecks: 12 January 1807
Ship	State	Description
Delfs Welvaaren	(Netherlands) Kingdom of Holland	Leiden gunpowder disaster: The ship exploded at Leiden, North Holland, destroying much of the town and killing 151 people.

=== 13 January ===
List of shipwrecks: 13 January 1807
Ship	State	Description
Columbia	United States	The ship capsized off Bermuda. She was on a voyage from Philadelphia, Pennsylvania, to Guadeloupe.
Jacob	United States	The ship was lost near Ocracoke, North Carolina. She was on a voyage from Bordeaux, Gironde, France to Baltimore, Maryland.

=== 15 January ===
List of shipwrecks: 15 January 1807
Ship	State	Description
Hero	United Kingdom	The ship was lost in Barnstaple Bay. She was on a voyage from Bridgwater, Somerset, to Plymouth, Devon.
Solide	United Kingdom	The ship was wrecked on the Hoyle Bank, in Liverpool Bay. She was on a voyage from Liverpool, Lancashire, to Limerick.

=== 16 January ===
List of shipwrecks: 16 January 1807
Ship	State	Description
Paulina	United States	The ship was wrecked on the Herd Sand, in the North Sea. Her crew were saved by the lifeboat Northumberland (United Kingdom). Paulina was on a voyage from Baltimore, Maryland, United States to Newcastle-upon-Tyne, Northumberland.
Walters	United States	The ship was driven ashore at Sandy Hook, New Jersey. Her crew were rescued. She was on a voyage from Amsterdam, North Holland, Kingdom of Holland to New York.

=== 17 January ===
List of shipwrecks: 17 January 1807
Ship	State	Description
Two Friends	United Kingdom	The ship was lost near St. Ives, Cornwall. She was on a voyage from Dungarvan, County Waterford, to Southampton, Hampshire.

=== 20 January ===
List of shipwrecks: 20 January 1807
Ship	State	Description
Ariel	France	The ship was wrecked on the French coast. She was on a voyage from Vlissingen, Zeeland, Kingdom of Holland to the Île de Ré, Charente-Inférieure.
John and James	United Kingdom	The ship departed from Newfoundland for Demerara. No further trace, presumed foundered with the loss of all hands.

=== 21 January ===
List of shipwrecks: 21 January 1807
Ship	State	Description
Lucy'	United Kingdom	The ship was driven ashore at Blackwall, London. She was on a voyage from Saint Kitts to London. She was refloated and taken in to London.

=== 22 January ===
List of shipwrecks: 22 January 1807
Ship	State	Description
Balance	United Kingdom	The ship was wrecked in the Orkney Islands with the loss of six of her crew. She was on a voyage from Danzig to Liverpool, Lancashire.

=== 23 January ===
List of shipwrecks: 23 January 1807
Ship	State	Description
Atlas	United Kingdom	The ship was wrecked in the Shetland Islands with the loss of a crew member. She was on a voyage from Leith, Lothian, to Jamaica.
Centurion	United Kingdom	War of the Fourth Coalition: The ship was captured in the Irish Sea by a French schooner privateer. She was set afire and sunk.
George Washington	United States	The ship was driven ashore and wrecked at San Sebastián, Spain. Her crew were rescued. She was on a voyage from Philadelphia, Pennsylvania to a French port.
HMS Orpheus	Royal Navy	The Amazon-class frigate was wrecked on a reef off Port Royal, Jamaica. Her crew survived.
Union	United Kingdom	War of the Fourth Coalition: The ship was captured in the Irish Sea by a French schooner privateer. She was set afire and sunk.

=== 24 January ===
List of shipwrecks: 24 January 1807
Ship	State	Description
HMS Crocodile	Royal Navy	The Banterer-class post-ship ran aground on No-Man's Sand, off Spithead, Hampshire. She was refloated.

=== 25 January ===
List of shipwrecks: 25 January 1807
Ship	State	Description
Leith Packet	United Kingdom	War of the Fourth Coalition: The ship was captured by a French privateer. She was burnt the next day. Leith Packet was on a voyage from a Baltic port to London.
Magnet	United Kingdom	War of the Fourth Coalition: The ship was captured by a French privateer. Her crew were taken off and she was abandoned. Magnet was on a voyage from Leith, Lothian, to London. she was discovered crewless the next day and taken in to Hull, Yorkshire.
Star	United Kingdom	War of the Fourth Coalition: The ship was captured by the privateer Brave (France) and presumed to have been destroyed. She was on a voyage from Greenock, Renfrewshire, to Deptford, Kent.

=== 27 January ===
List of shipwrecks: 27 January 1807
Ship	State	Description
Flora (Флора)	Imperial Russian Navy	The corvette capsized – but righted herself thanks to some of her masts breaking – with the loss of two of her crew; then on 28 January ran aground and sank near Vlorë, Albania. She was on a voyage from Korčula to Corfu. Having made it to shore, the crew (who were unaware that Russo-Turkish War had started) were taken prisoner by the Ottomans.

=== 30 January ===
List of shipwrecks: 30 January 1807
Ship	State	Description
Henrietta	United Kingdom	War of the Fourth Coalition: The ship was captured by a privateer. She was then driven ashore on Texel, North Holland, Kingdom of Holland by two Royal Navy cruisers. She was refloated but consequently sank.

=== Unknown date ===
List of shipwrecks: Unknown date in January 1807
Ship	State	Description
Adventure'	United Kingdom	The ship foundered. She was on a voyage from Montserrat to Liverpool, Lancashire.
Alexander	United Kingdom	The ketch was wrecked on the coast of Algeria. Her crew were rescued. She was on a voyage from Leith, Lothian, to Odesa, Russia.
Amphion	United States	The brig foundered whilst on a voyage from Portland, Maine, to Liverpool, with the loss of five of her crew. Survivors were rescued by Leonidas (United States).
Ann	United Kingdom	The ship was wrecked in the Turks Islands. She was on a voyage from Quebec, British North America to Jamaica.
Broderne	Hamburg	The ship was wrecked near Bergen, Norway.
Caroline	United States	The ship was driven ashore and wrecked at Livorno, Grand Duchy of Tuscany.
Centurion	United Kingdom	The ship was wrecked in the Orkney Islands. She was on a voyage from Pernau, Livonia, Russian Empire to Liverpool.
Elizabeth	United Kingdom	The ship was driven ashore at Caernarfon. She was on a voyage from Chester, Cheshire to Plymouth, Devon.
Engineer	United Kingdom	The ship was driven ashore at Bridlington, Yorkshire. She was on a voyage from London to Leeds, Yorkshire.
Esperance	United Kingdom	The ship was wrecked on the coast of Jutland. She was on a voyage from Memel, Prussia to London.
Felix	United Kingdom	The schooner was wrecked at St. Andero, Spain. There were four survivors.
Fitzwilliam	United States	The ship was driven ashore at Livorno.
Graff Bernstoff	Danzig	The ship was lost on the Dogger Bank. She was on a voyage from Danzig to Plymouth, Devon, United Kingdom.
Henry	United States	The ship was driven ashore at Livorno.
Hope	United Kingdom	The ship was driven ashore at Porto, Portugal. She was later refloated and taken in to Porto.
Hoppett	Flag unknown	The ship foundered off the Orkney Islands. She was on a voyage from Liverpool to the Øresund.
Importantia	United Kingdom	The ship was driven ashore on the coast of Norway. She was on a voyage from Hull, Yorkshire to Hamburg. Importantia was later refloated and taken in to Rægefjord.
Jessie	United Kingdom	The ship was abandoned whilst on a voyage from Liverpool to Cork. She was later towed in to Baltimore, County Cork.
Johanna	United Kingdom	War of the Fourth Coalition: The ship was captured and burn by a French Navy ship of the line. She was on a voyage from Liverpool to Wilmington, Delaware, United States.
John'	United States	The ship was wrecked at Charleston, South Carolina. Her crew were rescued. She was on a voyage from Africa to Charleston.
Kate	United States	The ship was driven ashore and damaged at Liverpool. She was on a voyage from Charleston to Liverpool. Kate was later refloated and beached.
Martha and Sophia	United Kingdom	The ship foundered in Gare Loch with the loss of all but two of her passengers and crew. She was on a voyage from Ullapool, Ross-shire to Bristol, Gloucestershire.
Minerva'	United Kingdom	The ship was wrecked on the coast of Norway. She was on a voyage from Memel, Prussia to London, or Hull, Yorkshire.
Neptune	United Kingdom	War of the Fourth Coalition: The ship was captured by the privateer Jena (France) whilst on a voyage from Danzig to London. She was subsequently sunk in the North Sea off Winterton-on-Sea, Norfolk.
Philanthropist	United States	The ship foundered on or about 20 January. She was on a voyage from Jamaica to Savannah, Georgia.
Republican	United States	The ship was driven ashore at Livorno.
Sally'	United States	The ship capsized at sea. Two of her crew were rescued. She was on a voyage from Cuba to New York.
Skelton Castle	British East India Company	The East Indiaman was lost whilst on a voyage from the United Kingdom to China.
Travellor	United Kingdom	The ship sank near Longhope, Orkney Islands. She was on a voyage from "Eastdale" to Leith, Lothian.
Triton	United Kingdom	The ship was lost in the Orkney Islands. She was on a voyage from a Baltic port to Liverpool, Lancashire.
Two Brothers	United Kingdom	The ship was abandoned in the Dogger Bank. She was on a voyage from Riga, Russia to Dundee, Forfarshire. She was taken in to Harwich, Essex on 7 January.
Two Friends	United Kingdom	The ship was lost near St. Ives, Cornwall. She was on a voyage from Caernarfon to London.
Two Marias	United States	The ship was driven ashore at Livorno.
Unnamed	United Kingdom	The brig struck the Outer Binks, in the North Sea and sank off the mouth of the Humber.

== February ==
=== 2 February ===
List of shipwrecks: 2 February 1807
Ship	State	Description
Active	United Kingdom	The brig was driven ashore and wrecked between Cuckmere Haven and Seaford, Sussex. Her crew survived. She was on a voyage from Swansea, Glamorgan, to Chatham, Kent.
Margaret	United Kingdom	The brig was driven ashore at the Birling Gap, Sussex. Her crew were rescued. She was on a voyage from Whitehaven, Cumberland, to London.
Mary Wilson	United Kingdom	The ship was driven ashore at Portpatrick, Wigtownshire. She was on a voyage from Lisbon, Portugal to Glasgow, Renfrewshire.
Prosperous	United Kingdom	The ship foundered off the coast of Dorset with the loss of two of her three crew. The survivor was rescued by Hope (United Kingdom).

=== 3 February ===
List of shipwrecks: 3 February 1807
Ship	State	Description
Mary	United Kingdom	The ship foundered in the English Channel off Christchurch, Hampshire. She was on a voyage from Fowey, Cornwall, to London.

=== 7 February ===
List of shipwrecks: 7 February 1807
Ship	State	Description
Elizabeth	United Kingdom	The ship was driven ashore at Toward Point, Argyllshire. She was on a voyage from the Clyde to Jamaica. Elizabeth was later refloated.
Hopewell	United Kingdom	The ship was driven ashore at Toward Point. She was on a voyage from the Clyde to Jamaica. Hopewell was later refloated and taken in to Greenock, Renfrewshire.
Marian	United Kingdom	The ship was driven ashore at Toward Point. She was on a voyage from the Clyde to Jamaica. Marian was later refloated.
Susannah	United Kingdom	The ship was lost with the loss of all but one of her crew. She was on a voyage from Dungarvan, County Waterford, to Dublin.

=== 8 February ===
List of shipwrecks: 8 February 1807
Ship	State	Description
Bradley	United Kingdom	The ship was run down and sunk off Robin Hoods Bay, Yorkshire by Moisley (United Kingdom). Her crew were rescued.
Medea	United Kingdom	The ship foundered in The Wash off King's Lynn, Norfolk. Her crew were rescued. She was on a voyage from Newcastle-upon-Tyne, Northumberland to King's Lynn.
Oliver Woolcot	United Kingdom	The ship ran aground on the Warden Ledge, off the Isle of Wight. She consequently put into Cowes, Isle of Wight.

=== 10 February ===
List of shipwrecks: 10 February 1807
Ship	State	Description
Nossa Senhora do Capo Verde	Portugal	The ship was lost on the coast of Holland. She was on a voyage from Lisbon to Cowes, Isle of Wight United Kingdom and Amsterdam, North Holland, Kingdom of Holland.

=== 11 February ===
List of shipwrecks: 11 February 1807
Ship	State	Description
Britannia	United Kingdom	The ship was destroyed by an explosion at Cork with the loss of at least eleven lives.

=== 12 February ===
List of shipwrecks: 12 February 1807
Ship	State	Description
HMS Atalante	Royal Navy	The brig-sloop was wrecked off the Île de Ré, Charente-Inférieure, France. Her crew were rescued by HMS Nile, HMS Penelope and HMS Pomone (all Royal Navy).

=== 13 February ===
List of shipwrecks: 13 February 1807
Ship	State	Description
Ann and Ellen	United Kingdom	The ship was wrecked on the Horse Bank, in the Irish Sea 10 nautical miles (19 km) off Lytham St. Annes, Lancashire. All eighteen people on board were rescued. She was on a voyage from Demerara to Liverpool, Lancashire.
Columbia	United States	The ship capsized off Bermuda. She was on a voyage from Philadelphia, Pennsylvania, to Guadeloupe.
Juffrouw Martz Dermens	Prussia	The ship ran aground on rocks at Blyth, Northumberland, United Kingdom and was wrecked. Her crew were rescued.
HMS Wagtail	Royal Navy	The Cuckoo-class schooner was wrecked at Vila Franca do Campo, Azores, Portugal with the loss of one of her eighteen crew.
HMS Woodcock	Royal Navy	The Cuckoo-class schooner was wrecked at Vila Franca do Campo. Her crew survived.

=== 14 February ===
List of shipwrecks: 14 February 1807
Ship	State	Description
HMS Ajax	Royal Navy	The Ajax-class ship of the line was destroyed by fire at Tenedos, Ottoman Empire, with the loss of 250 of the 630 people on board.
Jane	United States	The ship was driven ashore at Montego Bay, Jamaica.
Jason	United Kingdom	The ship was wrecked near Cromer, Norfolk. Her crew were rescued.
Mississippi	United States	The ship foundered in the Atlantic Ocean 80 nautical miles (150 km) south of New York. Her crew were rescued. She was on a voyage from London, United Kingdom to New York.

=== 15 February ===
List of shipwrecks: 15 February 1807
Ship	State	Description
Louisa	Hamburg	The ship was driven ashore and wrecked at Londonderry, United Kingdom.

=== 16 February ===
List of shipwrecks: 16 February 1807
Ship	State	Description
Franklin	United States	The ship was wrecked on Heneaga. Her crew were rescued. She was on a voyage from New York to Jamaica.
Lady Lees	United Kingdom	War of the Fourth Coalition: The ship was captured by the privateer Decidé (France). She was subsequently driven ashore by two British cutters.
Nelly and Ann	United Kingdom	The ship was driven ashore in Windmill Bay, Orkney Islands. She was on a voyage from Saint Petersburg, Russia to Dublin.

=== 17 February ===
List of shipwrecks: 17 February 1807
Ship	State	Description
Alexander	United Kingdom	The full-rigged ship was driven ashore and wrecked near Walmer Castle, Kent. She was on a voyage from London to St. Ubes, Spain.
Alliance	United Kingdom	The collier was driven ashore on the south coast of the Isle of Wight.
America	United States	The ship ran aground in the River Foyle. She was on a voyage from New York to Londonderry, United Kingdom.
Betsey	United Kingdom	The transport ship, a brig, was driven ashore and wrecked between Deal and South Foreland. She was on a voyage from Sheerness, Kent to Plymouth, Devn.
Boddingtons	United Kingdom	The ship was driven ashore between Deal and South Foreland, Kent.
Christina	United Kingdom	The ship was driven ashore and wrecked between Deal Castle and South Foreland. She was on a voyage from London to Charente, France.
Delight	United Kingdom	The sloop departed from Woodbridge, Suffolk for London. No further trace, presumed foundered with the loss of all hands.
Dawson	United Kingdom	The ship was driven ashore and wrecked between Deal and Kingsdown, Kent.
Earl Camden	British East India Company	The East Indiaman was driven ashore at Northfleet, Kent. She was later refloated.
Emmanuel	United Kingdom	The ship foundered in the North Sea off Margate, Kent.
George	United Kingdom	The brig was driven ashore and wrecked near Walmer Castle. She was on a voyage from London to Lisbon.
Griffin	United Kingdom	The full-rigged ship was driven ashore and wrecked between Deal and South Foreland. She was on a voyage from London to Demerara.
Grocer	United Kingdom	The sloop departed from Woodbridge for London. Presumed foundered off the north Kent coast on 19 February with the loss of all hands.
Hope	United Kingdom	The hoy was driven ashore and wrecked near Walmer Castle, Kent. She was on a voyage from London to Deal.
Huddersfield	United Kingdom	The ship foundered in the North Sea off Cromer, Norfolk. Her crew were rescued.
Iris, or Isis	United Kingdom	The full-rigged ship was driven ashore and wrecked near Deal Castle.
Isabella	United Kingdom	The ship was wrecked at Greenore Point, County Wexford Her crew were rescued. She was on a voyage from Dublin to Porto, Portugal.
Iris, or Isis	United Kingdom	The ship was driven ashore and wrecked near Deal Castle. She was on a voyage from London to Grenada.
John	United Kingdom	The sloop was wrecked at Great Yarmouth with some loss of life. She was on a voyage from Hull, Yorkshire to london.
Juffrow Christina	Kingdom of Hanover	The ship was driven ashore and wrecked near Deal Castle. She was on a voyage from London to the Charente, France.
La Jeira	Portugal	The brig was driven ashore and wrecked at Cowes, Isle of Wight, United Kingdom.
Lion	United Kingdom	The ship foundered in the North Sea. She was on a voyage from London to Selby, Yorkshire.
Magnet	United Kingdom	The ship was driven ashore and wrecked between Deal Castle and South Foreland.
Mary	United Kingdom	The ship foundered in the North Sea.
Nancy and Eleanor	United Kingdom	The ship foundered in the North Sea.
Nelson	United Kingdom	The ship foundered in the North Sea. She was on a voyage from London to Hull, Yorkshire.
Providence	United Kingdom	The brig was driven ashore and wrecked at Kingsdown with the loss of all hands. She was on a voyage from London to Poole, Dorset.
Regard	United Kingdom	The brig was driven ashore and wrecked between Deal Castle and Kingsdown. She was on a voyage from London to Portsmouth, Hampshire.
Stable	United Kingdom	The ship was driven ashore and wrecked between Deal and South Foreland.
St. George	United Kingdom	The full-rigged ship was driven ashore and wrecked at St. Margarets Bay, Kent. She was on a voyage from London to Jamaica.
St. Vincent	United Kingdom	The full-rigged ship was driven ashore and wrecked at Kingsdown.

=== 18 February ===
List of shipwrecks: 18 February 1807
Ship	State	Description
Abeona	United Kingdom	The ship was driven ashore and wrecked with the loss of all hands.
Apollo	United Kingdom	The ship was wrecked on the Pye Sand, in the North Sea off Harwich, Essex.
Barzillai	United Kingdom	The ship was driven ashore and wrecked near Boulogne, Pas-de-Calais, France. Six of her crew were rescued. She was on a voyage from London to Jamaica.
Breeze	United Kingdom	The ship was driven ashore and wrecked at Happisburgh, Norfolk.
Canadian	United Kingdom	The ship was driven ashore and wrecked on the French coast. Her crew were rescued. She was on a voyage from London to Faial, Azores, Portugal.
Charles and Mary	United Kingdom	The ship was driven ashore and wrecked at Happisburgh.
Charles Harman	United Kingdom	The ship was wrecked near Margate, Kent. She was on a voyage from Shoreham-by-Sea, Sussex to London.
Ceres	United Kingdom	The ship was driven ashore at Caister-on-Sea, Norfolk. Her crew were rescued.
Cybelle	United Kingdom	The transport ship was driven ashore at Sheerness, Kent. She was later refloated.
Delight	United Kingdom	The sloop foundered in the North Sea whilst on a voyage from Woodbridge, Suffolk, to London.
Dove	United Kingdom	The sloop was abandoned in the North Sea. Her crew were rescued. She was on a voyage from London to Weymouth, Dorset. She was subsequently taken in to Dover, Kent.
Duncan	United Kingdom	The ship was driven ashore between Great Yarmouth and Happisburgh.
Echo	United Kingdom	The ship was driven ashore between Great Yarmouth and Happisburgh. Her crew were rescued.
Ellill	United Kingdom	The ship was driven ashore at Winterton-on-Sea, Norfolk. Her crew were rescued. She was on a voyage from Newcastle upon Tyne, Northumberland to London.
Emily	United Kingdom	The ship was driven ashore and wrecked at "Oriel", France. Her crew survived but were made prisoners.
Farmer	United Kingdom	The brig collided with another vessel. She foundered with the loss of a crew member.
Firm	United Kingdom	The ship was abandoned in the English Channel off Étaples, Pas-de-Calais, France. Her crew were rescued by HMS Archer (Royal Navy).
Fortitude	United Kingdom	The ship was driven ashore at Winterton-on-Sea. Her crew were rescued.
Glory	United Kingdom	The ship foundered off Margate.
HMS Griper	Royal Navy	A storm drove the brig onshore on the French coast near Ostend. All aboard were lost.
Grocer	United Kingdom	The sloop foundered in the North Sea whilst on a voyage from Woodbridge, Suffolk, to London.
Hanna	United Kingdom	The ship was abadoned off the coast of Essex. She was subsequently taken in to Harwich.
HMRC Hunter	United Kingdom	The Revenue Cutter foundered in the North Sea off Happisburgh with the loss of all 33 crew.
Industry	United Kingdom	The ship was driven ashore and wrecked at Caister on Sea. Her crew were either lost, or rescued.
Jane or Jean	United Kingdom	The ship was driven ashore between Great Yarmouth and Lowestoft with the loss of her captain. She was on a voyage from Aberdeen to London.
Jupiter	United Kingdom	The transport ship was driven ashore at Sheerness, Kent. She was later refloated.
L'Ancreon	France	The privateer foundered at Dieppe, Seine-Inférieure.
Leeds Packet	United Kingdom	The ship foundered in the North Sea off Cromer, Norfolk. She was on a voyage from South Shields, County Durham, to Guernsey, Channel Islands.
Lord Duncan	United Kingdom	The ship was driven ashore at Caister-on-Sea. Her crew were rescued.
HMS Magpie	Royal Navy	War of the Fourth Coalition: The Cuckoo-class schooner ran aground near Perros, Côtes-du-Nord, France and was captured by the French.
Margaret	United Kingdom	The ship was driven ashore at Happisburgh, Norfolk. Her crew were rescued.
Molly	United Kingdom	The smack was driven ashore at Sheerness.
Nathaniel Brown	United Kingdom	a boat from Nathaniel Brown was driven ashore near Great Yarmouth.
Pomona	United Kingdom	The ship was driven ashore and wrecked between Great Yarmouth and Lowestoft with the loss of her captain. She was on a voyage from Sunderland, County Durham, to Plymouth, Devon.
HMS Prospero	Royal Navy	The bomb vessel was driven ashore and wrecked near Dieppe with the loss of all but six of her crew.
Queen of Harvest	United Kingdom	The brig was driven ashore at Dunkerque, Nord, France. She was on a voyage from North Shields, County Durham, to Newcastle-upon-Tyne, northumberland.
Retreat	United Kingdom	The transport ship was driven ashore at Sheerness. She was later refloated.
HMS Snipe	Royal Navy	The gun-brig was driven ashore between Great Yarmouth and Lowestoft with the loss of 73 of the 93 people on board. She was later refloated and taken in to Great Yarmouth in a severely damaged condition.
HMS Speedwell	Royal Navy	The ship was driven ashore and wrecked at Dieppe with the loss of all hands.
Sylph	United Kingdom	A skiff from Sylph was driven ashore at Margate.
Tartar	United Kingdom	The ship was driven ashore and wrecked between Great Yarmouth and Lowestoft with the loss of all eleven crew. She was on a voyage from South Shields, County Durham, to London.
Thomas and Mary	United Kingdom	The ship was driven ashore and wrecked with the loss of all hands.
Traveller	United Kingdom	The ship foundered in the North Sea off Walberswick, Suffolk with the loss of all hands.
Trelawney	United Kingdom	The ship was driven ashore at Winterton-on-Sea. Her crew were rescued. She was on a voyage from Great Yarmouth to Danzig or vice versa.
Two Brothers	United Kingdom	The ship was wrecked on the Sunk Sand, in the North Sea. She was on a voyage from Blakeney, Norfolk, to London.
Ulysses	United Kingdom	The ship was driven ashore and wrecked between Great Yarmouth and Lowestoft.
Union	United Kingdom	The sloop was driven ashore and wrecked between Deal Castle and South Foreland. She was on a voyage from London to Liverpool, Lancashire.
Union	United Kingdom	The ship foundered in the English Channel off Dover, Kent. She was on a voyage from London to Liverpool.
Wadstray	United Kingdom	The transport ship was driven ashore at Sheerness.
Two unnamed vessels	Flags unknown	A barque and a brig were driven ashore at Winterton-on-Sea with the loss of all hands.
Unnamed	United Kingdom	The Humber keel was driven ashore between Great Yarmouth and Lowestoft.
Three unnamed vessels	Flags unknown	The ships ran aground on the Scroby Sands, Norfolk. Two of them sank with the loss of all hands. The third was refloated.
Unnamed	Flag unknown	The ship collided with HMS Snipe and sank off the coast of Norfolk with the loss of all hands.
Unnnamed	Flag unknown	The brig foundered off Lowestoft with the loss of all eight crew.

=== 19 February ===
List of shipwrecks: 19 February 1807
Ship	State	Description
Bacchus	United Kingdom	The ship was driven ashore on the French or Dutch coast.
Brethy	United Kingdom	The ship was driven ashore on the French or Dutch coast.
Canada	United States	The brig was driven ashore on the French.
Ceres	United Kingdom	The ship was driven ashore on the French or Dutch coast.
Europa	United Kingdom	The ship was driven ashore on the French or Dutch coast.
Emilia	United Kingdom	The ship was driven ashore at Criel-sur-Mer, Seine-Inférieure.
Fox	United Kingdom	The ship was driven ashore on the French or Dutch coast with the loss of a crew member.
Freedom	United Kingdom	The ship was driven ashore and wrecked at Wells-next-the-Sea, Norfolk. She was a voyage from Hull, Yorkshire to Stockton on Tees, County Durham.
Friends	United Kingdom	The brig was driven ashore at Ostend, West Flanders, France.
Good Intention	United Kingdom	The brig was driven ashore on the Dutch coast.
London	United Kingdom	The ship was driven ashore at Le Tréport, Seine Maritime.
Lord Nelson	United Kingdom	The ship was driven ashore and wrecked near Dieppe, Seine-Inférieure, France.
Merchant	United Kingdom	The brig was driven ashore near Dieppe.
Ocean	United Kingdom	The ship was driven ashore at Saint-Valery-sur-Somme, Somme, France with the loss of two of her fifteen crew.
Selby	United Kingdom	The ship was driven ashore on the French or Dutch coast with the loss of two of her fourteen crew.
Spring	(United Kingdom of Great Britain and Ireland) Guernsey	The ship foundered in the English Channel off the French coast. Her crew were rescued. She was on a voyage from Guernsey to London.
Stafford	United Kingdom	The brig sprang a leak in the North Sea and was abandoned by her crew, two of whom were rescued by HMS Defence (Royal Navy). The rest were rescued by a sloop. Stafford was on a voyage from Sunderland, County Durham, to Portsmouth, Hampshire.
Unnamed	United Kingdom	The fishing boat was driven ashore at Great Yarmouth.
Two unnamed vessels	Flags unknown	The ships were driven ashore at Triminham, Norfolk.
130 unnamed vessels	Flags unknown	Eighty ships were sunk, driven ashore or damaged in a storm at Amsterdam, North Holland, Kingdom of Holland. A further 50 schuyts, lighters and other small vessels were wrecked or damaged.

=== 22 February ===
List of shipwrecks: 22 February 1807
Ship	State	Description
HMS Superieure	Royal Navy	The schooner ran aground on The Shingles, in the Solent. She was refloated.

=== 23 February ===
List of shipwrecks: 23 February 1807
Ship	State	Description
Rosanna	United States	The ship struck rocks off Bermuda. She was on a voyage from Baltimore, Maryland to La Guaira, Venezuela. She was refloated.
Unnamed	United Kingdom	The brig was driven ashore on Texel, North Holland, Kingdom of Holland.

=== 24 February ===
List of shipwrecks: 24 February 1807
Ship	State	Description
Cheesman	United States	The ship was driven ashore at Londonderry, United Kingdom. She was on a voyage from New York to Londonderry.
Thornton	United Kingdom	War of the Fourth Coalition: The ship was captured and burnt by Foudroyant (French Navy). She was on a voyage from Portsmouth, Hampshire, to São Miguel Island, Azores.

=== 25 February ===
List of shipwrecks: 25 February 1807
Ship	State	Description
Cicero	United Kingdom	The ship was wrecked on the Cobler's Rocks, off Barbados. Her crew were rescued. She was on a voyage from London to Jamaica.
Laurel	United Kingdom	The ship ran aground on the Goodwin Sands, Kent and was damaged. She was later refloated and taken in to Margate, Kent in a severely leaky condition. Laurel was on a voyage from Lancaster, Lancashire, to Carmarthen and London.
Nestor	United Kingdom	The ship ran aground at Sunderland, County Durham. She was refloated and resumed her voyage, but put in to Whitby, Yorkshire the next day, where she sank.
Two Friends	United States	The ship was wrecked in the Turks Islands. Her crew were rescued. She was on a voyage from Charleston, South Carolina, to Jamaica.

=== 26 February ===
List of shipwrecks: 26 February 1807
Ship	State	Description
Alexander	United Kingdom	The schooner was wrecked at Kinnaird Head, Aberdeenshire. Her six crew were rescued. She was on a voyage from Aberdeen to Dublin.
Juffrouw Henrietta	Danzig	The ship was driven ashore and wrecked at Sanday, Orkney Islands, United Kingdom. Her crew were rescued. She was on a voyage from Danzig to Liverpool, Lancashire, United Kingdom.
Utrecht	Royal Dutch Navy	The frigate was driven ashore and wrecked at Sanday with the loss of about 100 of the 450 people on board. Survivors were taken prisoner. She was on her maiden voyage, from Hellevoetsluis to Curaçao.
Unnamed	Portugal	The ship was wrecked near Den Helder, North Holland, Kingdom of Holland.

=== 27 February ===
List of shipwrecks: 27 February 1807
Ship	State	Description
Nestor	United Kingdom	The ship sank at Whitby, Yorkshire.
Unnamed	United Kingdom	The sloop sank in the Humber 4 nautical miles (7.4 km) upstream of Hull, Yorkshire. She was on a voyage from Hull to East Stockwith, Lincolnshire and Chesterfield, Derbyshire.

=== 28 February ===
List of shipwrecks: 28 February 1807
Ship	State	Description
Contest	(United Kingdom of Great Britain and Ireland) New South Wales	The sloop was driven ashore and wrecked at Port Stephens, New South Wales, Australia. Her crew were rescued.

=== Unknown date ===
List of shipwrecks: Unknown date in February 1807
Ship	State	Description
Adventure	United Kingdom	The ship was driven ashore near Liverpool, Lancashire, and was severely damaged. She was on a voyage from Liverpool to Barbados. Adventure was later refloated and taken in to Liverpool.
Alrand	Russia	The ship was wrecked at Memel, Prussia. Her crew were rescued. She was on a voyage from Saint Petersburg to London.
Anna	United Kingdom	The ship was wrecked at Pillau, Prussia. She was on a voyage from Memel to London.
Anna and Ellen	United Kingdom	The ship was driven ashore at Lytham St. Annes, Lancashire and was wrecked. She was on a voyage from Saint Vincent to Liverpool, Lancashire.
Bacchus	United Kingdom	The ship was driven ashore between Dunkerque, Nord and Havre de Grâce, Seine-Inférieure, France between 19 and 22 February.
Betsey	United Kingdom	The ship was wrecked near Padstow, Cornwall. she was on a voyage from Plymouth, Devon, to Swansea, Glamorgan.
Betsey	United Kingdom	The ship was wrecked near Londonderry. She was on a voyage from the West Indies to the Clyde.
HMS Blenheim	Royal Navy	The Sandwich-class ship of the line foundered in the Indian Ocean off Madagascar on or after 18 February with the loss of all hands.
Brethy	United Kingdom	The ship was driven ashore between Dunkerque and Havre de Grâce between 19 and 22 February.
Brilliant	United Kingdom	The ship was driven ashore at Cowes, Isle of Wight. She was on a voyage from Southampton, Hampshire, to Guernsey, Channel Islands.
Brothers	United Kingdom	War of the Fourth Coalition: The ship was captured by the French Navy whilst on a voyage from Tobago to London. She was set afire and sunk.
Canada	United States	The brig foundered in the English Channel off the coast of France between 19 and 22 February.
Ceres	United Kingdom	The ship was driven ashore between Dunkerque and Havre de Grâce between 19 and 22 February.
Columbia	United States	The ship was driven ashore at Formby, Lancashire. She was on a voyage from Charleston, South Carolina, to Liverpool. She was later refloated.
Dretby	United Kingdom	The ship was driven ashore on the French or Dutch coast.
Emanuel	United Kingdom	The ship foundered off Margate, Kent.
Emelia	United Kingdom	The ship was driven ashore and wrecked near "Oriel", France between 19 and 22 February.
Endeavour	United Kingdom	The transport ship foundered in the English Channel off Saint-Valery-sur-Somme, Somme, France. Her crew were rescued.
Erin	United Kingdom	The ship was driven ashore at Cork. She was on a voyage from Cork to Weymouth, Dorset.
Esther	United Kingdom	The ship was driven ashore on Dragør, Denmark.
Europa	United Kingdom	The ship was driven ashore between Dunkerque and Havre de Grâce between 19 and 22 February.
Favourite	United Kingdom	The ship was wrecked at Borness, Wigtownshire. She was on a voyage from Maryport, Cumberland, to an Irish port.
Fowey	United Kingdom	The ship struck rocks off Plymouth and was holed. She was towed in to Plymouth.
Fox	United Kingdom	The ship was driven ashore between Dunkerque and Havre de Grâce between 19 and 22 February.
Friends	United Kingdom	The brig was driven ashore and wrecked near Dieppe, Seine Maritime between 19 and 22 February.
George and Ann	United Kingdom	The ship was wrecked at Bonmahon, County Waterford. She was on a voyage from Liverpool to Waterford.
Goede Intentie	(Netherlands) Kingdom of Holland	The ship was wrecked on the coast of Jutland.
Goldfinch	United Kingdom	War of the Fourth Coalition: The ship was captured by the French Navy whilst on a voyage from Tobago to London. She was set afire and sunk.
Haverfordwest	United Kingdom	The ship was wrecked near Milford Haven, Pembrokeshire. She was on a voyage from Milford Haven to Bristol, Gloucestershire.
Hawke Packet	United Kingdom	The ship sank in the River Tyne. She was on a voyage from London to Newcastle upon Tyne.
Heart of Oak	United Kingdom	The ship foundered in the North Sea off Great Yarmouth, Norfolk.
Henry	United Kingdom	The ship ran aground off Great Yarmouth and was wrecked.
Isabella	United Kingdom	The ship struck the Tuskar Rock and was severely damaged. She put into Milford Haven. Isabella was on a voyage from Greenock, Renfrewshire, to Jamaica.
HMS Java	Royal Navy	The ship foundered in the Indian Ocean off Madagascar.
Lark	United Kingdom	The ship was driven ashore and wrecked at Barmstone, near Stonehaven, Aberdeenshire. Her crew were rescued. She was on a voyage from Sunderland, County Durham, to Stonehaven and the Shetland Islands.
Liberty	United Kingdom	The ship, a cartel, ran aground off Great Yarmouth. She was on a voyage from Texel, North Holland, Kingdom of Holland to a British port.
Ligueiro	Portugal	The ship was driven ashore near Cowes.
London Packet	United Kingdom	The ship was driven ashore and wrecked near Tréport, Seine-Inférieure between 19 and 22 February.
Mars	United States	The ship departed from New York for Bilbao, Spain. No further trace, presumed foundered with the loss of all hands.
Mary and Eleanor	United Kingdom	The ship ran aground off Great Yarmouth. She was on a voyage from Newcastle upon Tyne to London.
Mary Ellen	United Kingdom	War of the Fourth Coalition: The ship was captured by the French Navy whilst on a voyage from Guernsey, Channel Islands, to Newfoundland, British North America. She was set afire and sunk.
Memphis	United Kingdom	The ship was driven ashore at "Oldhaven". She was later refloated.
Merchant	United Kingdom	The brig was driven ashore and wrecked near Dieppe between 19 and 22 February.
Mercurius	United Kingdom	The ship was driven ashore near Karlskrona, Sweden. She was on a voyage from Memel to London.
Nelson	United Kingdom	The ship capsized and sank off Lowestoft, Suffolk. Her crew were rescued.
Nicholas and Jane	United Kingdom	The ship was wrecked at Helsingør, Denmark. She was on a voyage from Riga, Russia to Plymouth, Devon.
Ocean	United Kingdom	The ship was driven ashore and wrecked near Saint-Valery-sur-Somme, Somme, France between 19 and 22 February.
Orrick	United Kingdom	The ship foundered in the North Sea off Margate.
Palmyra	United States	The ship foundered off Liverpool. She was on a voyage from Bath, Maine, to Liverpool.
Peggy	United Kingdom	The ship foundered whilst on a voyage from Barbados to America. Her crew were rescued.
Prosperous	United Kingdom	The ship foundered.
Providence	United Kingdom	The ship was wrecked at St David's Head, Pembrokeshire. She was on a voyage from Youghal, County Cork, to Swansea.
Selby	United Kingdom	The ship was driven ashore between Dunkerque and Havre de Grâce between 19 and 22 February.
Sparrow	United Kingdom	War of the Fourth Coalition: The ship was captured by the French Navy whilst on a voyage from Newfoundland to a Mediterranean port. She was set afire and sunk.
Thought	United Kingdom	The brig foundered at the mouth of the River Clyde on the coast of Scotland with the loss of all hands. She was on a voyage from St Michael's Mount, Cornwall, to Glasgow, Renfrewshire.
Tyrone	United Kingdom	The sloop was driven ashore at Selsey, Sussex. She was on a voyage from Dungarvan, County Waterford, to Emsworth, Hampshire.
Unnamed	United Kingdom	The sloop was wrecked on Inchkeith, Fife. She was on a voyage from Newcastle upon Tyne to Montrose, Forfarshire.

== March ==
=== 1 March ===
List of shipwrecks: 1 March 1807
Ship	State	Description
Burlington	United Kingdom	War of the Fourth Coalition: The ship was captured by a French privateer. She was on a voyage from Hull, Yorkshire to São Miguel Island, Azores. Burlington was subsequently wrecked at Cherbourg, Seine-Inférieure, France.
Jack Tar	United Kingdom	The ship ran aground on the Goodwin Sands, Kent. She was on a voyage from South Shields, County Durham to Jamaica. She was refloated and taken in to Dover, Kent.
Leviathan	United Kingdom	The ship foundered with the loss of her captain. She was on a voyage from Jamaica to London.

=== 3 March ===
List of shipwrecks: 3 March 1807
Ship	State	Description
Samaritan's Hope	United Kingdom	The ship was driven ashore in Bangor Bay. She was on a voyage from Liverpool, Lancashire to Philadelphia, Pennsylvania, United States. She was refloated and taken in to Bangor, County Down.

=== 4 March ===
List of shipwrecks: 4 March 1807
Ship	State	Description
Betsey	United Kingdom	The ship was run down and sunk by another vessel with the loss of all but one of her crew. She was on a voyage from Falmouth, Cornwall, to Neath, Glamorgan.
HMS Blanche	Royal Navy	HMS Blanche. The fifth-rate frigate was wrecked off Ouessant, Finistère, France with the loss of 45 of her 284 crew.
Fredonia	United Kingdom	The ship departed from Bristol, Gloucestershire, for Philadelphia, Pennsylvania, United States. No further trace, presumed foundered with the loss of all hands.
London Merchant	United Kingdom	The brig was run down by Eleanor (United Kingdom) in the North Sea 2 nautical miles (3.7 km) off Scarborough, Yorkshire. Her crew were rescued. London Merchant was on a voyage from Woodbridge, Suffolk, to Newcastle-upon-Tyne, Northumberland

=== 5 March ===
List of shipwrecks: 5 March 1807
Ship	State	Description
HMS Pigmy	Royal Navy	The gun-brig was wrecked at Saint-Pierre-d'Oléron, Charente-Inférieure, France. Her 45 crew survived but were taken prisoner by the French.

=== 6 March ===
List of shipwrecks: 6 March 1807
Ship	State	Description
Mary	United Kingdom	The ship foundered in the Atlantic Ocean off the Isles of Scilly. Her crew were rescued.

=== 8 March ===
List of shipwrecks: 8 March 1807
Ship	State	Description
Crescent	United Kingdom	The whaler foundered off the coast of Patagonia. Her crew were rescued by Edward (United States). She was on a voyage from the South Seas to London.
James	United Kingdom	The ship was wrecked off Dublin. Her crew were rescued. She was on a voyage from Stranraer, Wigtownshire to Dublin.
John	United Kingdom	The ship was driven ashore in the Clyde. She was on a voyage from the Clyde to Jamaica.
John and Rosamund's Increase	United Kingdom	The ship departed Berwick-upon-Tweed, Northumberland for Hull, Yorkshire. Presumed foundered in the North Sea with the loss of all hands, a cask from the ship was discovered 3 nautical miles (5.6 km) off Whitby, Yorkshire by Advice (United Kingdom).
Leith Packet	United Kingdom	The ship was driven ashore at "Sandhale". She was on a voyage from Leith, Lothian, to Hull. Five of her eight crew survived until 11 March, when Berwick Packet rescued them.(United Kingdom).

=== 9 March ===
List of shipwrecks: 9 March 1807
Ship	State	Description
Mary	United Kingdom	The ship foundered in the Atlantic Ocean off Cádiz, Spain. She was on a voyage from Portsmouth, Hampshire, to Malta.

=== 10 March ===
List of shipwrecks: 10 March 1807
Ship	State	Description
Alpha	United Kingdom	The ship was driven ashore near Louth, Lincolnshire. Her crew were rescued.
Nostra Senora do Caro Verde	Portugal	The ship was wrecked on the Dutch coast. She was on a voyage from Cowes, Isle of Wight, United Kingdom to Amsterdam, North Holland, Kingdom of Holland.
Peggy	United Kingdom	The ship was wrecked on the Stoney Binks, in the North Sea with the loss of a crew member.
Royal Charlotte	United Kingdom	The transport ship was lost in the River Plate.
Unnamed	United Kingdom	The packet ship was wrcked on the coast of Lincolnshire with the loss of all hands. She was on a voyage from Hull, Yorkshire to Leith, Lothian.

=== 11 March ===
List of shipwrecks: 11 March 1807
Ship	State	Description
Unnamed	United Kingdom	The brig sank in the Humber with the loss of all hands.
Unnamed	United Kingdom	The sloop sank off in the North Sea the coast of Lincolnshire.

=== 13 March ===
List of shipwrecks: 13 March 1807
Ship	State	Description
Milton	United States	The ship ran aground off Bermuda. She was on a voyage from New York to Saint Thomas, Virgin Islands. Milton was later refloated.
Peggy	United Kingdom	The sloop was wrecked at Heddon-on-the-Wall, Northumberland. Her crew were rescued by a coble.

=== 14 March ===
List of shipwrecks: 14 March 1807
Ship	State	Description
Eliza and Mary	United States	The ship foundered in the Atlantic Ocean (35°10′N 57°12′W). Her crew were rescued. She was on a voyage from New York to London, United Kingdom.
Lady Charlotte Hope	United Kingdom	The brig was driven ashore at Marshchapel, Lincolnshire, with the loss of two of her crew. she was on a voyage from Hull, Yorkshire to Stockton-on-Tees, County Durham.
Two unnamed vessels	United Kingdom	The brigs were driven ashore near Grimsby, Lincolnshire.

=== 15 March ===
List of shipwrecks: 15 March 1807
Ship	State	Description
Adamant	United Kingdom	The ship was wrecked on the Herd Sand, in the North Sea off Hartlepool, County Durham. Her crew were rescued by a lifeboat. She was on a voyage from Sunderland, County Durham, to Aberdeen.
Dispatch	United Kingdom	The ship was driven ashore in the Pentland Firth.
Eliza	United Kingdom	The ship was driven ashore and wrecked near Fraserburgh, Aberdeenshire.

=== 16 March ===
List of shipwrecks: 16 March 1807
Ship	State	Description
Telegraph	United Kingdom	The ship foundered in the North Sea off the mouth of the Humber. Her crew were rescued.

=== 17 March ===
List of shipwrecks: 17 March 1807
Ship	State	Description
Isabella	United Kingdom	The ship was wrecked on the Tuskar Rock. Her crew were rescued. She was on a voyage from Limerick to Belfast, County Down.

=== 18 March ===
List of shipwrecks: 18 March 1807
Ship	State	Description
Yazon (Язон, 'Jason')	Imperial Russian Navy	The brig ran aground and was wrecked at Cape Tarkhankut, Crimea. Her crew were rescued. She was on a voyage from Sevastopol to Odesa.

=== 19 March ===
List of shipwrecks: 19 March 1807
Ship	State	Description
Good Intent	United Kingdom	The ship foundered in the English Channel off Fécamp, Seine-Inférieure, France. She was on a voyage from Portsmouth, Hampshire, to London.

=== 21 March ===
List of shipwrecks: 21 March 1807
Ship	State	Description
Merchant	United States	The ship was wrecked on a reef off Bermuda. Her crew were rescued. She was on a voyage from New London, Connecticut, to Bermuda.

=== 23 March ===
List of shipwrecks: 23 March 1807
Ship	State	Description
Lewis William	United States	The ship was wrecked on the Colorados, off the coast of Cuba. She was on a voyage from New Orleans, District of Louisiana to New York.
United Brothers	United Kingdom	The ship was wrecked near Portreath, Cornwall.

=== 25 March ===
List of shipwrecks: 25 March 1807
Ship	State	Description
Sally	United States	The ship was wrecked at New York. She was on a voyage from Jamaica to New York.

=== 26 March ===
List of shipwrecks: 26 March 1807
Ship	State	Description
Ann	United Kingdom	The brig sank at Whitby, Yorkshire.

=== 27 March ===
List of shipwrecks: 27 March 1807
Ship	State	Description
Ida	United Kingdom	The ship was wrecked on the Bawdsey Sand, in the North Sea off the coast of Suffolk. She was on a voyage from King's Lynn, Norfolk to London.

=== 30 March ===
List of shipwrecks: 30 March 1807
Ship	State	Description
Princess Royal	United Kingdom	The ship was destroyed by fire at Demerara.

=== 31 March ===
List of shipwrecks: 31 March 1807
Ship	State	Description
Hanina	United States	The ship was driven ashore and wrecked in the Delaware River.
Jane Ann	United States	The ship was driven ashore and wrecked in the Delaware River.
Rainbow	United States	The ship foundered off Milford, Delaware. She was on a voyage from Saint Vincent to Wilmington, Delaware.
Rhoda and Betsey	United Kingdom	The ship foundered in the Atlantic Ocean off Sandy Hook, New Jersey, United States. She was on a voyage from Liverpool, Lancashire, to New York.
Sally	United States	The ship was driven ashore in the Delaware River.
South Carolina	United States	The ship was driven ashore at Sandy Hook. She was on a voyage from Philadelphia, Pennsylvania, to India.
Three Apprentices	United States	The ship was driven ashore and wrecked at Sandy Hook. She was on a voyage from Havana, Cuba to Philadelphia.
Woodrop	United States	The ship was driven ashore in the Delaware River. She was on a voyage from Philadelphia to India.

=== Unknown date ===
List of shipwrecks: Unknown date in March 1807
Ship	State	Description
Alexander	United Kingdom	The privateer, of Plymouth, Devon, foundered with the loss of all hands.
Ann	United Kingdom	The ship was driven ashore in Dundrum Bay. She was on a voyage from Liverpool, Lancashire, to Glasgow, Renfrewshire.
Ann	United Kingdom	The ship was driven ashore near Wicklow. She was on a voyage from Chester, Cheshire, to Wicklow.
Aurora	United Kingdom	The ship was driven ashore near Grimsby, Lincolnshire.
Betsey	United Kingdom	The ship was driven ashore at "Sandhale". She was on a voyage from London to Hull, Yorkshire.
Britannia	United Kingdom	The ship ran aground on the Arklow Bank, off the coast of County Wicklow. She was on a voyage from Jamaica to the Clyde. She was refloated and taken in to Cork on 5 March.
Catherina	United Kingdom	The ship was driven ashore and wrecked at Ballyshannon, County Donegal. She was on a voyage from London to Sligo.
HMS Cesar	Royal Navy	The brig was wrecked in the Gironde. There were 45 survivors.
Charlotte	United Kingdom	The ship sank at Cardiff, Glamorgan.
Duck	United Kingdom	The ship was driven ashore and wrecked in the Isles of Scilly.
Duncan	United Kingdom	The ship was driven ashore near Wicklow. She was on a voyage from Liverpool to Wicklow.
Favourite	United Kingdom	The ship was wrecked in Broadhaven Bay with the loss of all hands.
Juno	United Kingdom	The ship was driven ashore and wrecked at Beaumaris, Anglesey. She was on a voyage from Liverpool to Tönning, Duchy of Schleswig.
Leicester	United Kingdom	The ship was wrecked at Whitby, Yorkshire. Her crew were rescued.
Lune	United Kingdom	The ship was driven ashore near Wicklow. She was on a voyage from Liverpool to Dublin.
Mary	United Kingdom	The ship foundered in the Atlantic Ocean off the Isles of Scilly on or about 6 March. Her crew were rescued.
Mary and Elizabeth	United Kingdom	The ship was wrecked on the Goodwin Sands, Kent with the loss of all hands. She was on a voyage from Boston, Lincolnshire, to Sandwich, Kent.
Nelly	United Kingdom	The ship was driven ashore at Corton, Suffolk. She was on a voyage from Sunderland, County Durham, to Colchester, Essex.
Nossa Senhora da Misericórdia	Portugal	The ship foundered whilst on a voyage from Saint-Malo, Ille-et-Vilaine, France to Lisbon. Her crew were rescued by HMS Narcissus (Royal Navy).
Nymph	United Kingdom	The ship ran aground on The Shingles, in the Solent. She was on a voyage from Cardiff to London. She was refloated and taken in to Cowes, Isle of Wight.
Peggy	United Kingdom	The ship foundered in the North Sea off the mouth of the Humber. She was on a voyage from South Shields, County Durham, to London.
Phœnix	United Kingdom	The ship was driven ashore and wrecked at Portland Castle, Dorset.
Small Bridge	United Kingdom	The ship was driven ashore at Portsmouth, Hampshire. She was on a voyage from London to Plymouth.
Temperance	United States	The ship was driven ashore in the Elbe. She was on a voyage from Philadelphia, Pennsylvania to Hamburg. She was refloated and taken in to Glückstadt, Duchy of Schleswig.
Two Brothers	United Kingdom	The ship foundered in the Atlantic Ocean off Mizen Head, County Cork. She was on a voyage from Chester to Dublin.
Washington	United States	The ship was lost off Texel, North Holland, Kingdom of Holland. She was on a voyage from Baltimore, Maryland, to Amsterdam, North Holland.

== April ==
=== 1 April ===
List of shipwrecks: 1 April 1807
Ship	State	Description
William and Mary	United Kingdom	The brig was driven ashore and wrecked near Wells-next-the-Sea, Norfolk with the loss of two of her crew.

=== 2 April ===
List of shipwrecks: 2 April 1807
Ship	State	Description
Louisa	United Kingdom	The ship was lost whilst on a voyage from Jamaica to Alexandria, Egypt. Her crew were rescued.

=== 5 April ===
List of shipwrecks: 5 April 1807
Ship	State	Description
Friendship	United Kingdom	The ship departed from Waterford for Newfoundland, British North America. No further trace, presumed foundered with the loss of all hands.
San Juan Principe	Portuguese Navy	The frigate was driven ashore and wrecked at Gibraltar with the loss of 199 of her 315 crew.

=== 6 April ===
List of shipwrecks: 6 April 1807
Ship	State	Description
Janet and Ann	United Kingdom	The ship foundered off Oban, Argyllshire. She was on a voyage from Glasgow, Renfrewshire, to Oban.

=== 10 April ===
List of shipwrecks: 10 April 1807
Ship	State	Description
Neptune	United States	The ship was wrecked at Waterford, United Kingdom. Her crew were rescued. She was on a voyage from Charleston, South Carolina, to Liverpool, Lancashire, United Kingdom.

=== 11 April ===
List of shipwrecks: 11 April 1807
Ship	State	Description
Brothers	United Kingdom	The sloop was driven ashore and wrecked on Burry Holms, Glamorgan. All on board were rescued. She was on a voyage from Carmarthen to Bristol, Gloucestershire.

=== 14 April ===
List of shipwrecks: 14 April 1807
Ship	State	Description
John	United States	The ship was wrecked in the Caicos Islands. She was on a voyage from Washington D.C. to Jamaica.

=== 15 April ===
List of shipwrecks: 15 April 1807
Ship	State	Description
Victor	United Kingdom	War of the Fourth Coalition: The sloop was severely damaged off Batavia, Netherlands East Indies in an engagement with three Dutch privateers, which she captured.

=== 17 April ===
List of shipwrecks: 17 April 1807
Ship	State	Description
Protector	United Kingdom	The sloop foundered at Spithead, Hampshire. Her crew survived.

=== 18 April ===
List of shipwrecks: 18 April 1807
Ship	State	Description
Unnamed	United Kingdom	A ferry capsized between Felixtowe, Suffolk and Harwich, Essex with the loss of more than 60 lives.

=== 20 April ===
List of shipwrecks: 20 April 1807
Ship	State	Description
HSwMS Ulla Fersen	Swedish Navy	The frigate foundered off Usedom, Pomerania.

=== 25 April ===
List of shipwrecks: 25 April 1807
Ship	State	Description
Albion	United Kingdom	The ship was run down and sunk in the North Sea off Rockcliffe. Her crew were rescued. She was on a voyage from London to South Shields, County Durham.

=== 26 April ===
List of shipwrecks: 26 April 1807
Ship	State	Description
Henry	United Kingdom	The ship was lost off Water Island, Virgin Islands.

=== 28 April ===
List of shipwrecks: 28 April 1807
Ship	State	Description
Ann	United Kingdom	The ship foundered whilst on a voyage from Lymington, Hampshire, to London.

=== 29 April ===
List of shipwrecks: 29 April 1807
Ship	State	Description
Quebec	(United Kingdom of Great Britain and Ireland) British North America	The ship foundered in the Atlantic Ocean (51°22′30″N 34°38′00″W) with the loss of her captain. Four of her crew were rescued by Anna Marie (United Kingdom). Quebec was on a voyage from Peterhead, Aberdeenshire, United Kingdom to Quebec City, Lower Canada. She was discovered at sea (43°21′N 31°20′W) on 16 May by Commerce (United Kingdom) and was set afire.
Triton	United Kingdom	The ship foundered off Barbuda. All on board were rescued.
Swift	United Kingdom	The ship wasn driven ashore at Liverpool, Lancashire. She was on a voyage from Liverpool to New York, United States. She was refloated the next day and put back to Liverpool in a severely leaky condition.

=== 30 April ===
List of shipwrecks: 30 April 1807
Ship	State	Description
Henrietta	United Kingdom	The ship ran aground on a sandbank 28 nautical miles (52 km) off Berbice. She was refloated on 24 May. She was on a voyage from Halifax, Nova Scotia, British North America to Surinam.

=== Unknown date ===
List of shipwrecks: Unknown date in April 1807
Ship	State	Description
Agenoria	United Kingdom	The ship was driven ashore in the Eyder. She was on a voyage from London to Tönningen, Duchy of Holstein.
Almy	United States	The ship was captured by a Spanish privateer but was subsequently lost. Her crew were rescued. She was on a voyage from Jamaica to New York.
Andalusia	United Kingdom	The ship was driven ashore at Memel, Prussia.
Arethusa	United Kingdom	The ship was driven ashore at Memel.
Collpitts	United Kingdom	The ship was driven ashore at "Holmstadt", Sweden. She was on a voyage from South Shields, County Durham, to a Baltic Port.
Columbia	United States	The ship was abandoned by her crew. She was on a voyage from Cádiz, Spain to New York.
Dantzig	United Kingdom	The ship was driven ashore at Memel. Dantzig was later refloated.
Dolphin	United Kingdom	The ship was driven ashore and wrecked near Tönning, Duchy of Holstein.
Echo	United Kingdom	The ship was driven ashore at Memel.
Eugenia	United States	The ship sprang a leak and was abandoned off Bermuda on or before 29 April. Her crew were rescued by Triton (United Kingdom), which subsequently foundered on 29 April. Eugenia was on a voyage from New York to Dublin, United Kingdom.
Francis	France	The ship was driven ashore and wrecked near Tönning.
Friendship	United Kingdom	The ship was driven ashore and wrecked in the River Shannon.
Haslewood	United Kingdom	The ship was driven ashore near Riga, Russia.
Java	Royal Dutch Navy	The frigate was in collision with Blenheim (Royal Dutch Navy) off the Island of Roderique, Dutch East Indies and foundered.
Loyal Volunteer	United Kingdom	The ship was driven ashore on Ramsey Island, Pembrokeshire. She was on a voyage from Bristol, Gloucestershire, to Dublin.
Maryann	United Kingdom	The ship was driven ashore at Memel.
Nancy	United Kingdom	The ship was driven ashore at Memel.
Neptune	United Kingdom	War of the Third Coalition: The ship was captured by a French privateer. She was driven ashore on Martinique, where she was burnt by an Antiguan privateer. Neptune was on a voyage from Newcastle upon Tyne, Northumberland to Grenada.
Prospera	(Netherlands) Kingdom of Holland	The ship was driven ashore and wrecked in the Eider.
Recovery	United Kingdom	The ship was driven ashore at Caister-on-Sea, Norfolk.
Sally	United States	The ship foundered in the North Sea off Texel, North Holland, Kingdom of Holland. She was on a voyage from Baltimore, Maryland, to Amsterdam, North Holland.
Sophia	United Kingdom	The ship was lost in Tilligo Bay with the loss of six of her crew. She was on a voyage from New South Wales to London.
Sussex	United Kingdom	The ship was driven ashore at Memel.
Thomas and Betsey	United Kingdom	The ship foundered at the mouth of the Eider. Her crew were rescued. She was on a voyage from Sunderland, County Durham, to Tönning.
Woolton	United Kingdom	The ship was lost near Holyhead, Anglesey. She was on a voyage from Demerara to Liverpool, Lancashire.

== May ==
=== 3 May ===
List of shipwrecks: 3 May 1807
Ship	State	Description
Swan	United Kingdom	The ship sank on the South Bull, off Dublin, with the loss of three of her crew.

=== 8 May ===
List of shipwrecks: 8 May 1807
Ship	State	Description
General Scott	United States	The ship foundered in the Atlantic Ocean (45°30′N 33°30′W) with the loss of 23 of the 41 people on board. Survivors were rescued by Anna Maria and Argo (both United Kingdom).

=== 11 May ===
List of shipwrecks: 11 May 1807
Ship	State	Description
Jason	United Kingdom	The ship sprang a leak in the Atlantic Ocean and was abandoned by her crew. They were rescued by William Taylor (United States). Jason was on a voyage from Leith, Lothian, to Virginia, United States.

=== 12 May ===
List of shipwrecks: 12 May 1807
Ship	State	Description
Liberty	United Kingdom	The ship foundered in the Grand Banks of Newfoundland. Her crew were rescued by Prince Frederick ( Denmark-Norway). Liberty was on a voyage from South Shields, County Durham, to Quebec.

=== 13 May ===
List of shipwrecks: 13 May 1807
Ship	State	Description
Exchange	United Kingdom	The ship was driven ashore on Bornholm, Denmark.
HMS Dauntless	Royal Navy	HMS Dauntless aground. War of the Third Coalition: The Combatant-class sloop ran aground in the Vistula near Danzig. She was bombarded by French artillery and captured.

=== 14 May ===
List of shipwrecks: 14 May 1807
Ship	State	Description
General Mercer	United States	The ship was driven ashore and wrecked near Vlissingen, Zeeland, Kingdom of Holland. Her crew were rescued. She was on a voyage from Baltimore, Maryland, to Rotterdam, South Holland, Kingdom of Holland.
Neptunus	(Netherlands) Kingdom of Holland	The ship was wrecked on the Goodwin Sands, Kent, United Kingdom. Her crew were rescued. She was on a voyage from Rotterdam to Lisbon, Portugal.

=== 16 May ===
List of shipwrecks: 16 May 1807
Ship	State	Description
Leopold	Duchy of Holstein	The ship was destroyed by fire at Dover, Kent, United Kingdom.

=== 18 May ===
List of shipwrecks: 18 May 1807
Ship	State	Description
Elizabeth and Margaret	United Kingdom	The ship was driven ashore on the French coast.
Prospect	United Kingdom	The ship was driven ashore on the French coast.
Two unnamed vessels	United Kingdom	The ships were driven ashore on the French coast.

=== 19 May ===
List of shipwrecks: 19 May 1807
Ship	State	Description
Hope	United Kingdom	The ship sank in Studland Bay.
Industry	United Kingdom	The sloop foundered in the Atlantic Ocean off Land's End, Cornwall. She was on a voyage from Newport, Monmouthshire to Exeter, Devon.
Orb	United States	The ship was wrecked near "Fahrsand". Her crew were rescued. She was on a voyage from Amsterdam, North Holland, Kingdom of Holland to Saint Petersburg, Russia.
Unnamed	United Kingdom	The brig foundered off Land's End.

=== 22 May ===
List of shipwrecks: 22 May 1807
Ship	State	Description
Unnamed	United Kingdom	The coble capsized off Whitby, Yorkshire. Her three crew were rescued by two other cobles.
Unnamed	United Kingdom	The coble capsized off Whitby. Her crew were rescued by another coble.

=== 24 May ===
List of shipwrecks: 24 May 1807
Ship	State	Description
Four unnamed vessels	Ottoman Navy	Russo-Turkish War: The ships were wrecked at Troy in an engagement with Imperial Russian Navy vessels.

=== 29 May ===
List of shipwrecks: 29 May 1807
Ship	State	Description
HMS Jackal	Royal Navy	The gun-brig was driven onto a sandbank and wrecked off Calais, France. Her crew survived but were taken prisoner.
Ventriloquist	United Kingdom	The ship sprang a leak in the North Sea. She subsequently foundered in The Wash off King's Lynn, Norfolk. Her crew were rescued. She was on a voyage from London to Hull, Yorkshire.
William and Nancy	United Kingdom	The ship was driven ashore and wrecked near Calais
York	United Kingdom	The ship was driven ashore and wrecked near Calais.

=== 30 May ===
List of shipwrecks: 30 May 1807
Ship	State	Description
Ganges	British East India Company	The East Indiaman sank off the Cape of Good Hope at 38°22′S 019°50′E, almost due south of Cape Agulhas. The East Indiaman Earl St Vincent ( British East India Company) rescued everyone on board, a total of 203 or 209 people, according to different sources. (One source claims that Ganges was lost in the Andaman Islands on 29 May.)
Harmonie	United Kingdom	The ship was driven ashore at Great Yarmouth, Norfolk. She was on a voyage from Copenhagen, Denmark to London.
Horizon	United Kingdom	The ship was lost near Brest, Finistère, France. Her crew were rescued. She was on a voyage from London to Lisbon, Portugal and Lima, Viceroyalty of Peru.
Northumberland	United Kingdom	The transport ship struck the Runnel Stone and foundered in the English Channel. All on board, more than 270 people, were rescued.
Zeelust	(Netherlands) Kingdom of Holland	The ship capsized and sank in the North Sea off Great Yarmouth. Her crew were rescued.
Many unnamed vessels	United Kingdom	Several fishing boats sank off Deal, Kent. Many more were driven ashore and wrecked.

=== Unknown date ===
List of shipwrecks: Unknown date in May 1807
Ship	State	Description
Amphitrite	United Kingdom	War of the Fourth Coalition: The ship was captured by a French privateer whilst on a voyage from Poole, Dorset, to Portugal. She was subsequently wrecked near Bordeaux, Gironde, France.
Brutus	United States	The ship ran aground on the Revelstone. She was on a voyage from New York to Saint Petersburg, Russia. She was refloated and completed her voyage, arriving o 2 June.
Charlotte	United States	The ship was driven ashore and wrecked in the Eyder.
Clothier	United Kingdom	War of the Fourth Coalition: The victualling ship was captured and sunk by the privateer General Perpignan (France).
Commerce	United Kingdom	The ship was driven ashore and wrecked at Algeciras, Spain. She was on a voyage from Belfast, County Antrim, to Sicily.
Constant Packet	United Kingdom	The ship was wrecked off São Miguel Island, Azores. She was on a voyage from the West Indies to Jersey, Channel Islands.
Eliza Ann	United Kingdom	The ship was driven ashore at Gibraltar.
Favouriten	Sweden	The brig was driven ashore and wrecked on the Isle of Roon, off Kungsbacka.
Hibernia	United Kingdom	The ship was lost near Memel, Prussia. She was on a voyage from London to a Baltic Port.
Jonge Tobias	Duchy of Holstein	The ship foundered in the North Sea off Texel, North Holland, Kingdom of Holland. Her crew were rescued. She was on a voyage from Husum to London, United Kingdom.
Mary-Ann	United Kingdom	The ship was wrecked on Andros, Greece. she was on a voyage from London to Constantinople, Ottoman Empire.
Nancy	United Kingdom	The ship ran aground in the Swine Bottoms. She was on a voyage from Gothenburg, Sweden to Riga, Russia. Nancy was later refloated and taken in to Copenhagen, Denmark for repairs.
Nossa Senhora de Boa Nova St Quivera	Portugal	The ship was wrecked on The Manacles. She was on a voyage from Hamburg to Porto.
Orb	United States	The ship was wrecked on the coast of Norway. She was on a voyage from Amsterdam, Holland to Saint Petersburg, Russia.
Prince of Wales	United Kingdom	The ship was lost near St. Ives, Cornwall. Her crew were rescued. She was on a voyage from Cork to Portsmouth, Hampshire.
Unnamed	France	The lugger ran aground off Blankenese, Duchy of Holstein and was wrecked.

== June ==
=== 8 June ===
List of shipwrecks: 8 June 1807
Ship	State	Description
Richard	United Kingdom	The ship foundered in the North Sea off Scarborough, Yorkshire. Her crew were rescued. She was on a voyage from Newcastle upon Tyne, Northumberland to King's Lynn, Norfolk.

=== 12 June ===
List of shipwrecks: 12 June 1807
Ship	State	Description
Charlotte	Denmark	The East Indiaman foundered in the Kattegat with the loss of all hands.
Fanny	United Kingdom	The ship foundered in the North Sea off Lindesnes, Norway. Her crew were rescued. She was on a voyage from Memel, Prussia to Great Yarmouth, Norfolk.
Senhora do Carmo e St Jozé	Portugal	The ship was wrecked at Porto. Her crew were rescued. She was on a voyage from Porto to Figueira da Foz and Brazil.

=== 17 June ===
List of shipwrecks: 17 June 1807
Ship	State	Description
Jane & Elizabeth	United Kingdom	The ship was driven ashore at Liverpool, Lancashire. She was on a voyage from Trinidad to Liverpool. She was later refloated and docked for repairs.

=== 21 June ===
List of shipwrecks: 21 June 1807
Ship	State	Description
Charlotte	Danish Asiatic Company	The East Indiaman foundered in the North Sea with the loss of all but one of her crew.
Curlew	United Kingdom	The ship was wrecked at Strömstad, Sweden.
Elizabeth	United Kingdom	The ship was wrecked near Strömstad. She was on a voyage from Memel, Prussia to London and/or Grangemouth, Stirlingshire.
Unnamed	Bremen	The brig was wrecked near Stromstad. Her crew were rescued.

=== 24 June ===
List of shipwrecks: 24 June 1807
Ship	State	Description
Isaac	United Kingdom	The ship was wrecked on the coast of Jutland. She was on a voyage from Hull, Yorkshire to Riga, Russia.

=== 27 June ===
List of shipwrecks: 27 June 1807
Ship	State	Description
Adventure	United Kingdom	The ship was wrecked on the coast of Jutland. She was on a voyage from London to Saint Petersburg, Russia.

=== 29 June ===
List of shipwrecks: 29 June 1807
Ship	State	Description
Hope	United Kingdom	The ship was run down and sunk by Monarch (United Kingdom). She was on a voyage from Jamaica to Quebec City, Lower Canada, British North America.

=== Unknown date ===
List of shipwrecks: Unknown date in June 1807
Ship	State	Description
Hope	United Kingdom	The ship was discovered at sea crewless. She was beached at Holme-next-the-Sea, Norfolk.
Mandarin	United States	The ship was wrecked on the coast of Holland. Her crew were rescued.
Mary	United States	The ship was driven ashore on Aspö, Sweden.
Nelly	United Kingdom	The ship was driven ashore on Siskar Island, in the Gulf of Finland. She was on a voyage from London to Saint Petersburg, Russia. Nelly was later refloated.
Prince	United Kingdom	The ship was wrecked near Goa in early June. She was on a voyage from Madras to Bombay, India.

== July ==
=== 1 July ===
List of shipwrecks: 1 July 1807
Ship	State	Description
Swinger	United Kingdom	The ship departed from Lisbon, Portugal for the River Plate. No further trace, presumed foundered in the Atlantic Ocean with the loss of all hands.

=== 3 July ===
List of shipwrecks: 3 July 1807
Ship	State	Description
Deane	United Kingdom	The ship was destroyed by fire whilst on a voyage from Trinidad to Liverpool, Lancashire. All on board were rescued.

=== 7 July ===
List of shipwrecks: 7 July 1807
Ship	State	Description
Erzhog Engel Michael	(Denmark) Norway	The ship was driven ashore near Falsterbo, Sweden. She was on a voyage from Christiansand to Saint Petersburg, Russia. Erzhog Engel Michael was later refloated and taken in to Copenhagen, Denmark

=== 12 July ===
List of shipwrecks: 12 July 1807
Ship	State	Description
Charles	United States	The schooner sank at 43°32′31″N 070°13′14″W with the loss of 16 lives after striking Watt′s Ledge, a reef in Casco Bay off the east side of Richmond Island off Cape Elizabeth, Massachusetts (now Maine). There were six survivors.

=== 17 July ===
List of shipwrecks: 17 July 1807
Ship	State	Description
Pretty Lass	United Kingdom	The transport ship sank in the River Plate.

=== 19 July ===
List of shipwrecks: 19 July 1807
Ship	State	Description
Harlequin	United Kingdom	The ship ran aground on the Blyth Bank, in the River Thames near Gravesend, Kent. She was on a voyage from London to Jamaica.

=== 20 July ===
List of shipwrecks: 20 July 1807
Ship	State	Description
Hibernia	United Kingdom	The ship ran aground and capsized in the River Liffey. She was on a voyage from Dublin to the West Indies.

=== 21 July ===
List of shipwrecks: 21 July 1807
Ship	State	Description
HMS Saturn	Royal Navy	The Arrogant-class ship of the line ran aground at Cádiz, Spain. She was refloated and taken in to Gibraltar for repairs.

=== 23 July ===
List of shipwrecks: 23 July 1807
Ship	State	Description
Isabella	United Kingdom	The ship foundered whilst on a voyage from London to Quebec. Her crew were rescued.

=== 25 July ===
List of shipwrecks: 25 July 1807
Ship	State	Description
Eliza	United Kingdom	The ship was wrecked at Montserrat in a hurricane. She was on a voyage from Montserrat to Bristol, Gloucestershire.
Lady Parker	United Kingdom	The ship was wrecked at Montserrat in a hurricane. She was son a voyage from Montserrat to London.
Lark	United States	The brig was wrecked at Barbados.
Memphis	United Kingdom	The whaler was last sighted on this date whilst on a voyage from Madeira to the South Seas. No further trace, presumed foundered with the loss of all hands.

=== 26 July ===
List of shipwrecks: 26 July 1807
Ship	State	Description
Eliza	United Kingdom	The ship was wrecked at Montserrat.
Lady Parker	United Kingdom	The ship was wrecked at Montserrat.
Maria	United Kingdom	The ship was wrecked at Saint Kitts.
Rolla	United Kingdom	The ship was driven ashore in the Mississippi River. She was on a voyage from New Orleans, Louisiana Territory, to Liverpool, Lancashire.
Four unnamed vessels	Flags unknown	Two schooners and two sloops were wrecked at Saint Kitts.

=== 27 July ===
List of shipwrecks: 27 July 1807
Ship	State	Description
Fame	United Kingdom	The ship was lost on the Eastern Sea Reef. All aboard took to her boats and were saved.
Freedom	United Kingdom	War of the Fourth Coalition: The ship was captured by a French privateer off Saint Kitts and was run ashore near Sint Maarten. She was on a voyage from Suriname to London. She was recaptured on 29 July and refloated.

=== 29 July ===
List of shipwrecks: 29 July 1807
Ship	State	Description
Maria	United Kingdom	The ship was wrecked at Saint Kitts.

=== Unknown date ===
List of shipwrecks: Unknown date in July 1807
Ship	State	Description
Betsey	United Kingdom	The ship was driven ashore in the Humber.
Catherine or Katherine	United Kingdom	The ship was driven ashore and wrecked in the Isles of Scilly. She was on a voyage from Jamaica to London.
Hanover	United Kingdom	The ship was driven ashore in the River Thames at Blackwall, Middlesex. She was on a voyage from Jamaica to London.
Henrick	Bremen	The ship was wrecked on the Swedish coast. She was on a voyage from Bremen to Copenhagen, Denmark.
Independence	United States	The ship was destroyed at Loango by an explosion with the loss of over 200 lives.
Maria Catharina	Duchy of Holstein	The ship was driven ashore near Cartagena, Spain. She was on a voyage from Cette, Hérault, France to Tönningen.
Pacific	United Kingdom	The ship was lost on the coast of Holland.
Resolution	United Kingdom	The ship was driven ashore and wrecked in the River Thames at Blackwall. She was on a voyage from Jamaica to London.
Thetis	United Kingdom	The ship was wrecked on Saaremaa, Russia. She was on a voyage from Liverpool, Lancashire, to Reval and Saint Petersburg, Russia.
Young Regulus	United Kingdom	The ship was lost near Gibraltar. She was on a voyage from Malta to London.

== August ==
=== 8 August ===
List of shipwrecks: 8 August 1807
Ship	State	Description
Enigheden	Denmark	The ship sank in the Gironde.
Hope	United States	The ship sank in the Gironde.

=== 11 August ===
List of shipwrecks: 11 August 1807
Ship	State	Description
Slade	United Kingdom	The ship was run ashore on Langlade Island and was abandoned by her crew. She was on a voyage from Quebec City, Lower Canada, British North America to London.

=== 13 August ===
List of shipwrecks: 13 August 1807
Ship	State	Description
HMS Cassandra	Royal Navy	The Adonis-class schooner capsized and sank off Bordeaux, Gironde, France with the loss of thirteen lives.
Friendship	United Kingdom	The ship was last sighted on this date whilst on a voyage from Montevideo to London. No further trace, presumed foundered with the loss of all hands.
Resolution	Denmark	The brig was lost near Gibraltar. Her crew were rescued.

=== 17 August ===
List of shipwrecks: 17 August 1807
Ship	State	Description
Eclipse	United Kingdom	Gunboat War: The ship was captured by two Royal Danish Navy gunboats. She was set afire and sunk. Eclipse was on a voyage from Memel, Prussia to King's Lynn, Norfolk.

=== 18 August ===
List of shipwrecks: 18 August 1807
Ship	State	Description
Resolution	Denmark-Norway	The brig foundered off Gibraltar.

=== 25 August ===
List of shipwrecks: 25 August 1807
Ship	State	Description
Europa	United Kingdom	The ship was driven ashore at Barbados. She was on a voyage from the Clyde to Saint Thomas, Virgin Islands.

=== 26 August ===
List of shipwrecks: 26 August 1807
Ship	State	Description
HDMS Stubbekjøbing	(Denmark) Dano-Norwegian Navy	Napoleonic Wars: The gunboat was destroyed by mortar fire in Svanemølle Bay.

=== 29 August ===
List of shipwrecks: 29 August 1807
Ship	State	Description
Hercules	United States	The ship foundered with the loss of six of her crew. She was on a voyage from Bordeaux, Gironde, France to New York.
John Gilpin	United Kingdom	The ship was in collision with another vessel off Great Yarmouth, Norfolk and sank. She was on a voyage from Teignmouth, Devon, to Hull, Yorkshire and Newcastle upon Tyne, Northumberland.

=== 30 August ===
List of shipwrecks: 30 August 1807
Ship	State	Description
Charles	United Kingdom	The transport ship was destroyed by an explosion at Copenhagen, Denmark with the loss of all fifteen crew.
Stork	United Kingdom	War of the Fourth Coalition: The ship was driven ashore near Jérémie, Hispaniola by a French privateer and was burnt. She was on a voyage from Saint Domingo to London.

=== 31 August ===
List of shipwrecks: 31 August 1807
Ship	State	Description
Badger	United Kingdom	War of the Fourth Coalition: The brig was captured off Porto, Portugal by a Spanish vessel and was run ashore. She was on a voyage from Dublin to Porto. Badger was later refloated with assistance from HMS Milbrook (Royal Navy).
Hull Packet	United Kingdom	War of the Fourth Coalition: The ship was captured off Porto by a Spanish vessel and was run ashore. She was on a voyage from Dublin to Porto.

=== Unknown date ===
List of shipwrecks: Unknown date in August 1807
Ship	State	Description
Duncombe	United Kingdom	Gunboat War: The ship was captured by some Danish gunboats. She was set afire and sunk. Duncombe was on a voyage from Hull, Yorkshire to a Baltic port.
Huron	United States	The ship was driven ashore and wrecked at Liverpool, Lancashire, United Kingdom. She was on a voyage from Liverpool to New York.
Marchioness Wellesley	United Kingdom	The East Indiaman was driven ashore between Channel Creek and Culpee, India and was abandoned by her crew. Although described as wrecked, she was later repaired and returned to service.
Mariner	United Kingdom	The ship was wrecked of the Falsterbø Reef in the Baltic Sea. She was on a voyage from Whitby, Yorkshire to Riga, Russia.
Melchbourn	United Kingdom	The ship ran aground at Barnstaple, Devon. She was on a voyage from Cork to Bristol, Gloucestershire. She was refloated and taken in to Barnstaple.
Neptune	United Kingdom	The ship foundered in the Atlantic Ocean. Her crew were rescued. She was on a voyage from Torbay, Devon, to Newfoundland, British North America.
Olive Branch	United Kingdom	The ship foundered off the Shetland Islands.
Satisfaction	United Kingdom	The ship was lost in Dundrum Bay. Her crew were rescued. She was on a voyage from Liverpool to Pictou, Nova Scotia, British North America.
HMS Surveillante	Royal Navy	The Virginie-class frigate ran aground off Copenhagen, Denmark. She was refloated.
Two Brothers	United Kingdom	The ship was wrecked near Topsham, Devon.
Welcome Messenger	United Kingdom	The ship was driven ashore near Topsham.

== September ==
=== 4 September ===
List of shipwrecks: 4 September 1807
Ship	State	Description
Industry	United Kingdom	The brig was driven ashore and wrecked near Wexford with the loss of four of the five people on board. She was on a voyage from Cobh, County Cork, to Liverpool, Lancashire.

=== 5 September ===
List of shipwrecks: 5 September 1807
Ship	State	Description
Alexander	United Kingdom	The sloop was driven onto the Wallace Rocks, in the Irish Sea off Ballywater, County Wexford.

=== 6 September ===
List of shipwrecks: 6 September 1807
Ship	State	Description
Betsey Fisher	United Kingdom	The ship was driven ashore and wrecked at Dunbar, Lothian. She was on a voyage from Saint Petersburgh, Russia to Dundee, Perthshire.
Euphemia and Ann	United Kingdom	The ship was driven ashore at Dunbar. She was on a voyage from Banff, Aberdeenshire, to London.
Industry	United Kingdom	The ship was abandoned in the Irish Sea. She was subsequently driven ashore near Wexford. She was on a voyage from Newfoundland, British North America to Cork and Liverpool, Lancashire. Industry was later refloated and taken in to Waterford.
James	United Kingdom	The ship was wrecked at North Berwick, Lothian. She was on a voyage from Galway to Newcastle-upon-Tyne, Northumberland.
Juno	United Kingdom	The ship was captured by two Spanish privateers and was run ashore and wrecked at Algeciras, Spain. She was on a voyage from Amsterdam, North Holland, Kingdom of Holland to a Mediterranean port.
Lowther	United Kingdom	The ship was driven ashore at Skerries, County Dublin, and consequently sank. She was on a voyage from Whitehaven, Cumberland, to Dublin.
Marianne or Mary Ann	United Kingdom	The ship was driven ashore at Holyhead, Anglesey.
Mary	United Kingdom	The ship was wrecked at Leith, Lothian. She was on a voyage from Easdale, Inner Hebrides, to Leith.
Mary	United Kingdom	The ship was driven ashore and wrecked at Portknockie, Morayshire with the loss of all hands. She was on a voyage from a Baltic port to London.
Neptune	United Kingdom	The ship was wrecked at Holyhead. She was on a voyage from Saint-Domingue to Liverpool, Lancashire.
Peggy	United Kingdom	The ship foundered in the Irish Sea off Port Erin, Isle of Man. Her crew were rescued. She was on a voyage from Ayr to Dublin.
President	United Kingdom	The ship was driven ashore and wrecked at Holyhead. She was on a voyage from Whitehaven to an Irish port.
Scout	United Kingdom	The ship was wrecked at Holyhead.
Unnamed	United Kingdom	The sloop was driven ashore and wrecked at Dunbar.
Unnamed	United Kingdom	The sloop was driven ashore at Dunbar.
Unnamed	United Kingdom	The ship was driven ashore at Dunbar.

=== 8 September ===
List of shipwrecks: 8 September 1807
Ship	State	Description
Juno	United States	Peninsular War: The ship was captured in the Mediterranean Sea by two Spanish privateers. She was driven ashore and wrecked at Algeciras, Spain.
Success	United Kingdom	The ship foundered in the Atlantic Ocean off Land's End, Cornwall. She was on a voyage from Swansea, Glamorgan, to Looe, Cornwall.

=== 9 September ===
List of shipwrecks: 9 September 1807
Ship	State	Description
Bristol Packet	United Kingdom	The ship was driven ashore at Dublin. She was on a voyage from Dublin to Bristol, Gloucestershire. She was later refloated.

=== 10 September ===
List of shipwrecks: 10 September 1807
Ship	State	Description
Eclipse	United States	On her maiden voyage, the 343-ton ship struck a reef and sank in 18 feet (5.5 m) of water off Sanak Island in the Catherine Archipelago in Russian America with the immediate loss of at least 22 lives. Four of the survivors died in 1809 when a new schooner they built from her wreckage also was wrecked while they were trying to sail to safety.

=== 11 September ===
List of shipwrecks: 11 September 1807
Ship	State	Description
Good Intent	United Kingdom	The ship was driven ashore and wrecked on the Dutch coast with the loss of all but one of her crew. She was on a voyage from Arkhangelsk, Russia to Hull, Yorkshire.

=== 12 September ===
List of shipwrecks: 12 September 1807
Ship	State	Description
Argo	United Kingdom	The ship was abandoned by her crew, who were rescued. She was on a voyage from Newfoundland, British North America to Lisbon, Portugal.
Industry	United Kingdom	The brig was wrecked near Wexford with the loss of four of the five people on board. She was on a voyage from Cobh, County Cork to Liverpool, Lancashire.
John Jones	United Kingdom	The ship departed from The Downs for Pensacola, New Spain. No further trace, presumed foundered with the loss of all hands

=== 13 September ===
List of shipwrecks: 13 September 1807
Ship	State	Description
Vrow Anna	(Netherlands) Kingdom of Holland	The ship was driven ashore and wrecked on Texel, North Holland.

=== 15 September ===
List of shipwrecks: 15 September 1807
Ship	State	Description
Camilla	United Kingdom	The ship capsized in a squall off Saint Lucia with the loss of a crew member. She was on a voyage from Newfoundland, British North America to Barbados.
Elizabeth	United States	The ship was driven ashore and wrecked at Lowestoft, Suffolk, United Kingdomm.

=== 19 September ===
List of shipwrecks: 19 September 1807
Ship	State	Description
Grand Sachem	United States	The ship ran aground at Liverpool, Lancashire, United Kingdom. She was on a voyage from Liverpool to New York. She was refloated the next day.
Susannah	United States	The ship was driven ashore at Plymouth, Devon, United Kingdom. She was refloated.

=== 28 September ===
List of shipwrecks: 28 September 1807
Ship	State	Description
Hope	United Kingdom	The ship sprang a leak and foundered in the Irish Sea with the loss of a crew member. She was on a voyage from Dublin to Swansea, Glamorgan.
Svyatoy Ioann (Святой Иоанн, 'St. John')	Imperial Russian Navy	The transport ship was driven ashore and wrecked at the mouth of the Kamchatka River with the loss of five lives. The rescue of her crew was aided by transport ship Feodosy (Феодосий, Imperial Russian Navy).

=== 29 September ===
List of shipwrecks: 29 September 1807
Ship	State	Description
Ann	United Kingdom	The brig was driven ashore and wrecked at Blakeney, Norfolk. Her crew were rescued.
Lady St. John	United Kingdom	The ship was driven ashore in Bootle Bay. She was on a voyage from Nevis to Liverpool, Lancashire.
Susannah	United States	The ship ran aground at Plymouth, Devon, United Kingdom. She was on a voyage from Barcelona, Spain to Plymouth. She was refloated.
Two unnamed vessels	Flags unknown	The ships foundered off Point Palmyras, India with the loss of all hands.

=== 30 September ===
List of shipwrecks: 30 September 1807
Ship	State	Description
Charming Nancy	United Kingdom	The sloop foundered in The Downs. Her crew were rescued. She was on a voyage from Portland, Dorset, to Ramsgate, Kent.
John and Joseph	United States	The ship was wrecked off Middelburg, Zeeland, Kingdom of Holland. She was on a voyage from Baltimore, Maryland, to Amsterdam, North Holland, Kingdom of Holland.
Mary	United Kingdom	The ship foundered in the North Sea off the mouth of the Humber.
Mary & Elizabeth	United Kingdom	The brig was wrecked on the Goodwin Sands, Kent with the loss of all hands. She was on a voyage from Porto, Portugal to London.
Ocean	United Kingdom	The brig ran aground on the Nore Sand, in the River Medway and was wrecked.
HMS Railleur	Royal Navy	The ship-sloop was driven ashore on Læsø, Denmark. She was later refloated.
Venus	Denmark	The ship was lost near "Cunbrishamn". She was on a voyage from Helsingør to Norrköping, Sweden.
Five unnamed vessels	United Kingdom	The ships were driven ashore on Læsø.

=== Unknown date ===
List of shipwrecks: Unknown date in September 1807
Ship	State	Description
Amalthea	United Kingdom	War of the Fourth Coalition: The ship was captured by a Spanish ship and was plundered. She was recaptured by HMS Alcmene (Royal Navy) and taken in to Porto, Portugal.
Bellona	United Kingdom	The ship was wrecked at Bolt Head, Devon, with the loss of five of her crew. She was on a voyage from Surinam to London.
Concord	United Kingdom	The ship foundered in the Atlantic Ocean. Her crew survived. She was on a voyage from St. Ubes, Spain to Newfoundland, British North America.
Dispatch	United Kingdom	The ship foundered in the English Channel off Jersey, Channel Islands. Her crew were rescued. She was on a voyage from Bristol, Gloucestershire, to Jersey.
HDMS Ditmarsken	(Denmark) Dano-Norwegian Navy	Napoleonic Wars, Battle of Copenhagen: The ship of the line was burnt after the battle, being deemed useless for Royal Navy service.
Dolphin	United Kingdom	The ship was driven ashore near Holyhead, Anglesey.
Elizabeth	United States	The ship was driven ashore and wrecked at Great Yarmouth, Norfolk. she was on a voyage from Amsterdam, North Holland, Kingdom of Holland to Baltimore, Maryland.
HMS Elizabeth	Royal Navy	The cutter foundered with the loss of all hands.
HDMS Flaadebatteri No. 1	(Denmark) Dano-Norwegian Navy	Napoleonic Wars: Battle of Copenhagen: The floating battery was destroyed at Copenhagen.
Glasgow	United Kingdom	The ship departed from Drogheda, County Louth, for Liverpool. No further trace, presumed foundered with the loss of all hands.
Goodintent	United Kingdom	The ship was wrecked on the coast of Scotland. She was on a voyage from Arkhangelsk, Russia to Hull, Yorkshire.
HDMS Hajen	(Denmark) Dano-Norwegian Navy	Napoleonic Wars: Battle of Copenhagen: The gun barge was scuttled at Copenhagen.
Humber	United Kingdom	The ship was wrecked on the coast of Norway. Her crew survived but were taken prisoner.
Jason	United States	The ship was wrecked on Grand Cayman with the loss of all but two of her crew. She was on a voyage from Jamaica to Philadelphia, Pennsylvania.
HDMS Kiempen	(Denmark) Dano-Norwegian Navy	Napoleonic Wars: Battle of Copenhagen: The gun barge was scuttled at Copenhagen. Subsequently refloated and returned to service.
HDMS Lindormen	(Denmark) Dano-Norwegian Navy	Napoleonic Wars: Battle of Copenhagen: The gun barge was scuttled at Copenhagen. Subsequently refloated and returned to service.
Maglona	United Kingdom	The ship was driven ashore at Drogheda, County Louth. She was on a voyage from Newry, County Antrim, to Liverpool, Lancashire.
Margaretta	United Kingdom	The ship departed from Rio de Janeiro for the West Indies. No further trace, presumed foundered with the loss of all hands.
HDMS Mars	(Denmark) Dano-Norwegian Navy	Napoleonic Wars, Battle of Copenhagen: The ship of the line was burnt on Saltholm.
Mary and Tom	United Kingdom	The ship foundered in the Baltic Sea. She was on a voyage from Saint Petersburg, Russia to Milford, Pembrokeshire.
Prosperity	United Kingdom	The ship was driven ashore near Holyhead. She was on a voyage from Whitehaven, Cumberland, to Dublin.
Marquis of Huntley	United Kingdom	The ship was driven ashore and wrecked in the Orkney Islands. She was on a voyage from Quebec City, Lower Canada, British North America to London.
HDMS St. Thomas	(Denmark) Dano-Norwegian Navy	Napoleonic Wars, Battle of Copenhagen: The frigate was burnt, being deemed useless for Royal Navy service.
Squirrel	United Kingdom	The ship was driven ashore on the Isle of Arran. She was on a voyage from Limerick to Galway. Squirrel was later refloated and resumed her voyage.
HDMS Sværdfisken	(Denmark) Dano-Norwegian Navy	Napoleonic Wars: Battle of Copenhagen: The gun barge was scuttled at Copenhagen. Subsequently refloated and returned to service.
HDMS Triton	United Kingdom	Napoleonic Wars, Battle of Copenhagen: The frigate was burnt of Saltholm, or on the Swedish coast.
William	United Kingdom	The ship foundered in the Gulf of Finland. Her crew were rescued. She was on a voyage from Saint Petersburg to Dundee, Forfarshire.
Woodhouse	United Kingdom	The ship was wrecked on Hogland, Russia. She was on a voyage from Narva, Russia to Hull.
Unnamed	United Kingdom	The ship was driven ashore near Holyhead. She was on a voyage from Dumbarton to Drogheda.
Unnamed	United Kingdom	The galiot was driven ashore near Holyhead. She was on a voyage from Dublin to Liverpool.

== October ==
=== 2 October ===
List of shipwrecks: 2 October 1807
Ship	State	Description
Roebuck	United States	The ship foundered with the loss of two of her crew. She was on a voyage from Philadelphia, Pennsylvania, to Trinidad.

=== 4 October ===
List of shipwrecks: 4 October 1807
Ship	State	Description
Adventure	United Kingdom	The ship foundered in the Atlantic Ocean off Cape Breton Island, British North America. Her crew were rescued. She was on a voyage from the Clyde to Halifax, British North America.

=== 6 October ===
List of shipwrecks: 6 October 1807
Ship	State	Description
Edwin	Flag unknown	The ship was lost off Lindesnes, Norway. Her crew were rescued. She was on a voyage from Saint Petersburg, Russia to Boston.

=== 7 October ===
List of shipwrecks: 7 October 1807
Ship	State	Description
Intrepid	United States	The ship foundered whilst on a voyage from Philadelphia, Pennsylvania, to Tönning, Duchy of Holstein. Her crew were rescued.

=== 8 October ===
List of shipwrecks: 8 October 1807
Ship	State	Description
Richard	United Kingdom	The ship foundered in the North Sea. She was on a voyage from Newcastle-upon-Tyne, Northumberland to King's Lynn, Norfolk. Her crew were rescued by the brig Favourite (United Kingdom).

=== 9 October ===
List of shipwrecks: 9 October 1807
Ship	State	Description
Mary	United Kingdom	The sloop departed Leith, Lothian for Whitby, Yorkshire. No further trace, presumed foundered in the North Sea with the loss of all hands.

=== 10 October ===
List of shipwrecks: 10 October 1807
Ship	State	Description
Albertina	(Netherlands) Kingdom of Holland	The ship was wrecked on the coast of Heligoland.
Dobut	United Kingdom	The ship departed from Quebec, British North America for London. No further trace, presumed foundered with the loss of all hands.
Martha	United Kingdom	The ship foundered off the coast of Jutland. She was on a voyage from London to Copenhagen, Denmark.
Mary	United Kingdom	The ship departed from Leith, Lothian, for Whitby, Yorkshire. No further trace, presumed foundered with the loss of all hands.

=== 12 October ===
List of shipwrecks: 12 October 1807
Ship	State	Description
Union	United States	The ship was driven ashore and wrecked at Barry's Point, County Cork, United Kingdom. Her crew were rescued. She was on a voyage from Baltimore, Maryland, to Cork, United Kingdom.

=== 14 October ===
List of shipwrecks: 14 October 1807
Ship	State	Description
HMS Pert	Royal Navy	The brig-sloop was driven ashore and wrecked on Margarita Island on the Spanish Main with the loss of ten of her crew. Survivors were rescued the next day by Alarma (Spain).

=== 16 October ===
List of shipwrecks: 16 October 1807
Ship	State	Description
HMS Maria	Royal Navy	The schooner foundered in the Leeward Islands during a hurricane with the loss of all hands.
Pert	United Kingdom	The brig, a privateer, was driven ashore and wrecked on the Isla Margarita in a hurricane. Twelve of her crew were lost.
Susannah	(United Kingdom of Great Britain and Ireland) British North America	The ship was driven ashore and wrecked on Tobago. She was on a voyage from Tobago to New Brunswick.

=== 19 October ===
List of shipwrecks: 19 October 1807
Ship	State	Description
Dowson	United Kingdom	The ship was abandoned in the Atlantic Ocean. Her seventeen crew were rescued by Lipton ( (United Kingdom of Great Britain and Ireland) British North America). Dowson was on a voyage from Whitby, Yorkshire to Richibucto, New Brunswick, British North America.

=== 20 October ===
List of shipwrecks: 20 October 1807
Ship	State	Description
Unnamed	United Kingdom	The collier was lost off St Alban's Head, Dorset. Her crew were rescued.

=== 21 October ===
List of shipwrecks: 21 October 1807
Ship	State	Description
Flora	United States	The ship was wrecked at Leith, Lothian, United Kingdom. She was on a voyage from Virginia to Leith.

=== 22 October ===
List of shipwrecks: 22 October 1807
Ship	State	Description
Alexander	United Kingdom	The ship was wrecked near Killala, County Mayo.
Alexander	United Kingdom	The transport ship foundered in the Atlantic Ocean. There were at least 21 survivors of the 110 people on board. They took to a boat, and were rescued by Brutus (United States). Alexander was on a voyage from Montevideo, Viceroyalty of the Río de la Plata to a British port.
Diana	United Kingdom	The ship was driven ashore on "Sunda Island".
Goodintent	United Kingdom	The ship was driven ashore and wrecked at Southwold, Suffolk, with the loss of three of her crew. She was on a voyage from South Shields, County Durham, to London.
Hope	United Kingdom	The transport ship foundered in the North Sea off Lowestoft, Suffolk with the loss of all but one of those on board.
Hopewell	United Kingdom	The ship was driven ashore and wrecked at Corton, Suffolk. Her crew were rescued. She was on a voyage from Sunderland, County Durham, to Rochester, Kent.
Margaret and Jane	United Kingdom	The ship was wrecked near Sligo. Her crew were rescued. She was on a voyage from Liverpool, Lancashire, to Sligo.
Nancy	United Kingdom	The ship was driven ashore at Great Yarmouth, Norfolk. She was on a voyage from South Shields, County Durham, to London
Orphan	United Kingdom	The ship was driven ashore at Corton. Her crew were rescued. She was on a voyage from South Shields to Whitstable, Kent.
Pactolus	United Kingdom	The ship was driven ashore and wrecked at Great Yarmouth with the loss of all hands.
Petronelle	Denmark-Norway	The ship was driven ashore and wrecked off Sandwich, Kent. She was on a voyage from Longsound to Bristol, Gloucestershire, United Kingdom.
HMS Spitfire	Royal Navy	The Tisiphone-class fireship ran aground at Sheerness, Kent. She was refloated.
Unnamed	United Kingdom	The hoy foundered off Lowestoft. Her crew were rescued.
Five unnamed vessels	Flags unknown	The ships were wrecked between Killala and Sligo.

=== 23 October ===
List of shipwrecks: 23 October 1807
Ship	State	Description
Anna Maria	United Kingdom	The ship was wrecked near Portrush, County Antrim Her crew were rescued. She was on a voyage from Liverpool, Lancashire, to Westport, County Mayo.
Eliza	United Kingdom	The ship was driven ashore near Wexford. She was on a voyage from Greenock, Renfrewshire, to Jamaica. Eliza was later refloated.
HDMS Neptunus	(Denmark) Dano-Norwegian Navy	The 84-gun ship of the line, a British prize, ran aground off Copenhagen. Her crew were rescued. She was later refloated and taken in to Great Yarmouth, Norfolk, United Kingdom

=== 24 October ===
List of shipwrecks: 24 October 1807
Ship	State	Description
Oliver	United Kingdom	The ship foundered in the Atlantic Ocean (22°15′N 87°14′W). She was on a voyage from New Orleans, Louisiana Territory, for Liverpool, Lancashire.

=== 25 October ===
List of shipwrecks: 25 October 1807
Ship	State	Description
HMS Subtle	Royal Navy	The schooner ran aground on a reef in St George's Channel in Bermuda at approximately 32°16′40″N 65°02′20″W, 8 nautical miles (15 km; 9.2 mi) west-northwest of Somerset Island. She soon rolled onto her side, becoming a total loss. Her crew abandoned ship in her boats and survived.

=== 28 October ===
List of shipwrecks: 28 October 1807
Ship	State	Description
Earl of Dalkeith	United Kingdom	The ship was driven ashore and wrecked at Alnwick, Northumberland. Her crew were rescued. She was on a voyage from Hull to Leith, Lothian.

=== 29 October ===
List of shipwrecks: 29 October 1807
Ship	State	Description
Anna	United Kingdom	The ship was driven ashore on Osmussaar, Russia. She was on a voyage from Saint Petersburg, Russia to London.
George	United Kingdom	The ship was driven ashore on Osmussaar. She was on a voyage from Saint Petersburg to London.
Rambler	United Kingdom	The brig foundered in the Bay of Bulls with the loss of 138 of the 146 people on board. She was on a voyage from Leith, Lothian to Pictou, Nova Scotia, British North America.
Sarah	United Kingdom	War of the Fourth Coalition: The ship was captured by a French privateer in the Atlantic Ocean off Land's End, Cornwall whilst on a voyage from Liverpool, Lancashire, to Great Yarmouth, Norfolk. Her own crew were taken off and a prize crew put aboard. She subsequently foundered off Bideford with the loss of all but one of the prize crew.

=== 30 October ===
List of shipwrecks: 30 October 1807
Ship	State	Description
HMS Zenobia	Royal Navy	The schooner ran aground 20 nautical miles (37 km) south of Cape Henry, Virginia, United States. Her remaining six crew abandoned her on 6 December, eighteen having previously deserted.

=== 31 October ===
List of shipwrecks: 31 October 1807
Ship	State	Description
Augustus Cæsar	United Kingdom	The transport ship was driven ashore and wrecked at Ter Heijde, South Holland, Kingdom of Holland. All 224 people on board survived, but were taken prisoner. The ship was captured.
Bee	United Kingdom	The ship was driven ashore on the coast of Holland. Her crew were rescued but made prisoners.

=== Unknown date ===
List of shipwrecks: Unknown date in October 1807
Ship	State	Description
HDMS Aalborg	(Denmark) Dano-Norwegian Navy	The gunboat was lost in the Kattegat.
Abeona	United Kingdom	The ship was driven ashore and wrecked near Wexford. She was on a voyage from Liverpool, Lancashire, to Charleston, South Carolina, United States.
Alicia	United Kingdom	The ship of the line foundered off the north coast of Jutland, Denmark with the loss of more than 500 of the approximately 1,200 people on board.
Ann	United Kingdom	The ship was driven ashore and wrecked at Gothenburg, Sweden. She was on a voyage from Riga, Russia to London.
HDMS Arendal	(Denmark) Dano-Norwegian Navy	The gunboat was lost in the Kattegat.
HDMS Assens	(Denmark) Dano-Norwegian Navy	The gunboat was lost in the Kattegat.
Averick	United Kingdom	The ship was wrecked on the Nore, in the River Medway.
Betsey	United Kingdom	The ship was wrecked at Arkhangelsk, Russia. She was on a voyage from Arkhangelsk to London.
Betsey and Nelly	United Kingdom	The ship was discovered derelict at sea. She was taken in to Rye, Sussex.
Betsey and Peggy	United States	The brig was abandoned in the Atlantic Ocean.
Brothers	United Kingdom	The schooner was driven ashore and wrecked at Blyth, Northumberland. She was on a voyage from Newburgh, Fife, to Sunderland, County Durham.
Ceres	United Kingdom	The ship ran aground on Læsø, Denmark. She was on a voyage from Riga to Portsmouth, Hampshire.
Christian Elizabeth	Prussia	The ship ran aground off Ventava, Courland Governorate.
HDMS Christiansund	(Denmark) Dano-Norwegian Navy	The gunboat was lost in the Kattegat.
Concordia	Grand Duchy of Tuscany	The ship was wrecked in the Saltee Islands, County Donegal, United Kingdom with the loss of three of her crew.
Dapper	United Kingdom	The ship was discovered crewless at sea. She was on a voyage from Jersey, Channel Islands to Leith, Lothian. She was taken in to Southwold, Suffolk.
Diana	United Kingdom	The ship was driven ashore in Hornbeck Bay. She was on a voyage from Dundee, Forfarshire, to Riga.
Dragon	United States	The ship was driven ashore at Vlissingen, Zeeland, Holland. She was on a voyage from New York to Antwerp, France.
Endeavour	United Kingdom	The transport ship was wrecked on the Kentish Knock, in the North Sea with the loss of 27 of the 35 people on board.
HDMS Faaborg	(Denmark) Dano-Norwegian Navy	The gunboat was driven ashore in the Kattegat. Subsequently returned to service.
Fair Creole	(United States) Louisiana Territory	The ship was driven ashore on Texel, North Holland, Kingdom of Holland. She was later refloated.
HDMS Flensborg	(Denmark) Dano-Norwegian Navy	The gunboat was lost in the Kattegat.
Formosa	United Kingdom	The ship struck the Whitby Rock. She was on a voyage from Newcastle upon Tyne, Northumberland to London. Formosa was later refloated and taken in to Whitby, Yorkshire.
HDMS Frederiksund	(Denmark) Dano-Norwegian Navy	The gunboat was lost in the Kattegat.
Friendship	United Kingdom	The ship was driven ashore on Dragør, Denmark. She was on a voyage from Saint Petersburgh, Russia to London. She was refloated and taken in to Malmö, Sweden.
General Prescott	United Kingdom	The ship was driven ashore on the Welsh coast. She was on a voyage from Messina, Kingdom of Sicily to Liverpool.
Glenalmond	United Kingdom	The ship was driven ashore in the Shetland Islands.
Golden Rule	United States	The ship was abandoned in the Atlantic Ocean with the loss of three of her crew. She was on a voyage from Wiscasset, Maine, to Liverpool. Survivors were rescued by George (United States). The wreck was later discovered at 48°32′N 26°55′W by Adelaide (United States).
Gute Sacke	(Netherlands) Kingdom of Holland	The ship struck the pier and sank at Dover, Kent, United Kingdom.
HDMS Helsingør	(Denmark) Dano-Norwegian Navy	The gunboat was lost in the Kattegat.
HDMS Holbek	(Denmark) Dano-Norwegian Navy	The gunboat was driven ashore in the Kattegat. Subsequently returned to service.
John	United Kingdom	The ship was wrecked near Wexford with the loss of three of her crew.
HDMS Kallundborg	(Denmark) Dano-Norwegian Navy	The gunboat was lost in the Kattegat.
Kewson	United Kingdom	The ship was wrecked near Halifax, Nova Scotia, British North America. Her crew were rescued. She was on a voyage from London to Halifax and Prince Edward Island.
HDMS Kjerteminde	(Denmark) Dano-Norwegian Navy	The gunboat was driven ashore in the Kattegat. Subsequently returned to service.
HDMS Langesund	(Denmark) Dano-Norwegian Navy	The gunboat was lost in the Kattegat.
Liverpool	United Kingdom	The ship was driven ashore and wrecked at South Shields, County Durham.
HDMS Middelfart	(Denmark) Dano-Norwegian Navy	The gunboat was lost in the Kattegat.
HDMS Nakskov	(Denmark) Dano-Norwegian Navy	The gunboat was lost in the Kattegat.
Neptune	United Kingdom	The ship was driven ashore near Dagerort, Russia and was abandoned by her crew. She was on a voyage from Saint Petersburg, Russia to Grangemouth, Stirlingshire.
HDMS Nestved	(Denmark) Dano-Norwegian Navy	The gunboat was driven ashore in the Kattegat. Subsequently returned to service.
HDMS Nykjøbing	(Denmark) Dano-Norwegian Navy	The gunboat was driven ashore in the Kattegat. Subsequently returned to service.
HDMS Nysted	(Denmark) Dano-Norwegian Navy	The gunboat was driven ashore in the Kattegat. Subsequently returned to service.
HDMS Odense	(Denmark) Dano-Norwegian Navy	The gunboat was lost in the Kattegat.
HDMS Rødbye	(Denmark) Dano-Norwegian Navy	The gunboat was lost in the Kattegat.
Rose	United Kingdom	The collier foundered with the loss of at least three lives.
HDMS Roskilde	(Denmark) Dano-Norwegian Navy	The gunboat was lost in the Kattegat.
HDMS Saltholmen	(Denmark) Dano-Norwegian Navy	The gunboat was lost in the Kattegat.
HDMS Staværn	(Denmark) Dano-Norwegian Navy	The gunboat was lost in the Kattegat.
Speculation	United Kingdom	The sloop was driven ashore and wrecked between Bishopstone Tide Mill and Newhaven, Sussex. Her crew survived. She was on a voyage from Newhaven to Plymouth, Devon.
HDMS Svendborg	(Denmark) Dano-Norwegian Navy	The gunboat was lost in the Kattegat.
Traveller	United Kingdom	The ship was driven ashore in the Shetland Islands. She was on a voyage from Trondheim, Norway to Dundalk, County Louth.
Union	United Kingdom	The ship was wrecked on the coast of Lincolnshire. Her crew were rescued. She was on a voyage from Gainsborough, Lincolnshire, to Wisbech, Cambridgeshire.
Vriendschap	(Netherlands) Kingdom of Holland	The ship was wrecked on the Dutch coast. She was on a voyage from London to Gothenburg, Sweden.
HDMS Wiborg	(Denmark) Dano-Norwegian Navy	The gunboat was lost in the Kattegat.
Winter	United Kingdom	The ship was wrecked at Memel, Prussia. She was on a voyage from Memel to London.
Wisbech Packet	United Kingdom	The ship was driven ashore and wrecked on Lindisfarne. Her crew were rescued. She was on a voyage from Great Yarmouth, Norfolk, to Stirling.
Unnamed	United Kingdom	The sloop was wrecked 30 nautical miles (56 km) from Holyhead.

== November ==
=== 1 November ===
List of shipwrecks: 1 November 1807
Ship	State	Description
Earl of Dalkeith	United Kingdom	The ship struck a reef in the North Sea off Boulmer, Northumberland and sank. Her crew were rescued. She was on a voyage from Hull, Yorkshire to Newcastle-upon-Tyne, Northumberland.

=== 2 November ===
List of shipwrecks: 2 November 1807
Ship	State	Description
Crumwell Bottom	United Kingdom	The ship was lost near Lowestoft, Suffolk. Her crew were rescued. She was on a voyage from Selby, Yorkshire to London.
Olive Branch	United Kingdom	The ship was driven ashore at Middelburg, Zeeland, Holland.
Recovery	United Kingdom	The transport ship was driven ashore at Portsmouth, Hampshire. She was later refloated.
Star	United Kingdom	The ship was driven ashore at Dungeness, Kent. She was on a voyage from Colchester, Essex, to Portsmouth, Hampshire.
Venus	Portugal	The ship departed from Porto for London. No further trace, presumed foundered with the loss of all hands.

=== 3 November ===
List of shipwrecks: 3 November 1807
Ship	State	Description
Grovehill	United Kingdom	The ship was wrecked off Dragør, Denmark.
Mercury	United Kingdom	The brig was driven ashore and wrecked near Ayr with the loss of all on board. She was on a voyage from Porto, Portugal to Greenock, Renfrewshire.
Messenger	United Kingdom	The ship was driven ashore in the Clyde. She was refloated.
Vancouver	United States	The ship was driven ashore in the Clyde.
Venus	United Kingdom	The ship was driven ashore at Crovie Head, Banffshire. All on board were rescued. She was later refloated and taken in to Gardenstown, Banffshire.

=== 4 November ===
List of shipwrecks: 4 November 1807
Ship	State	Description
Emperor of Russia	United Kingdom	The transport ship was wrecked on Texel, North Holland, Kingdom of Holland. Her crew were rescued but made prisoners.
Harmonia	United Kingdom	The ship was wrecked near St. Ives, Cornwall. Her crew were rescued. She was on a voyage from Porto, Portugal to Sligo.
Unity	United Kingdom	The fishing smack, which had been hired as a mailboat, was wrecked on the coast of Norway with the loss of her captain. The survivors were taken prisoner.
Union Packet	United Kingdom	The ship was wrecked at Østerrisør, Norway.

=== 7 November ===
List of shipwrecks: 7 November 1807
Ship	State	Description
Almira	United States	The ship departed Plymouth, Devon, United Kingdom for Amsterdam, North Holland, Kingdom of Holland. No further trace, presumed foundered with the loss of all hands.
Bell	United Kingdom	The ship was run down and sunk in the North Sea off Stockton-on-Tees, Yorkshire.
James and Rebecca	United Kingdom	The transport ship was wrecked at Mullion, Cornwall, with the loss of 43 of the 210 people on board. Survivors were rescued by a breeches buoy that was fabricated by her second mate. She was on a voyage from Buenos Aires, Argentina to an English port.
Unnamed	France	War of the Fourth Coalition: The tartane ran aground at Carthagena, Viceroyalty of New Granada in an action with HMS Grasshopper (1806) and HMS Rennommee (both Royal Navy). She was captured, but was not burnt due to there being many wounded aboard, and also women and children.
Unnamed	Spain	War of the Fourth Coalition: The brig ran aground at Carthagena in an action with HMS Grasshopper (1806) and HMS Rennommee (both Royal Navy). She was captured, but was not burnt due to there being many wounded aboard, and also women and children.

=== 8 November ===
List of shipwrecks: 8 November 1807
Ship	State	Description
Bell	United Kingdom	The ship was run down and sunk in the North Sea off Stockton on Tees, County Durham by Newcastle Packet (United Kingdom) with the loss of three lives. Bell was on a voyage from Newcastle upon Tyne, Northumberland to London.

=== 10 November ===
List of shipwrecks: 10 November 1807
Ship	State	Description
Bloomfield	United Kingdom	The sloop was driven ashore near Great Yarmouth, Norfolk.
Brothers	United Kingdom	The ship was driven ashore near Great Yarmouth. She was on a voyage from Hull, Yorkshire to Gibraltar.
Ceres	United Kingdom	The ship sank at Milford, Pembrokeshire. She was on a voyage from Youghall, County Cork to Glasgow, Renfrewshire.
Lark	United Kingdom	The ship was driven ashore near Bridlington, Yorkshire. She was on a voyage from Great Yarmouth to a Scottish port.
HMS Leveret	Royal Navy	The Cruizer-class brig-sloop was wrecked in the North Sea off Great Yarmouth, Norfolk. Her crew were rescued by the fishing smack Samuel (United Kingdom).
Mathew	United Kingdom	The ship was driven ashore near Bridlington.
Providence	United Kingdom	The transport ship was wrecked on the Long Sand, in the North Sea. Her crew were rescued.
Salisbury	United Kingdom	The transport ship was wrecked on the Long Sand, in the North Sea off Deal, Kent with the loss of over 240 lives.
Sarah	United Kingdom	The ship sprang a leak and was abandoned in the Atlantic Ocean. All on board survived. She was on a voyage from Greenock, Renfrewshire, to New York, United States.
Search	United Kingdom	The ship was driven ashore at Great Yarmouth. Her crew were rescued. Search was on a voyage from Hull, Yorkshire to London, she was later refloated and taken in to Great Yarmouth.
Victory	United Kingdom	The ship was lost at Pictou, Nova Scotia, British North America. Her crew were rescued.

=== 11 November ===
List of shipwrecks: 11 November 1807
Ship	State	Description
Betsey	United Kingdom	The brigantine was driven ashore and wrecked at the mouth of the River Tees near Skinningrove, Yorkshire. Her crew were rescued.
Brunton	United Kingdom	The sloop was driven ashore at the mouth of the River Tees near Saltburn, Yorkshire. Her crew were rescued. She was later refloated and taken in to Whitby for repairs.
Cornelia	United Kingdom	The brig ran aground on the Herd Sand, in the North Sea off the mouth of the River Tyne. Her crew were rescued by the lifeboat Northumberland (United Kingdom). Cornelia was later refloated and brought in to South Shields, County Durham.
Eagle	United Kingdom	The packet ship foundered with the loss of all on board.
Economy	United Kingdom	The ship was lost near St. Ives, Cornwall with the loss of all hands.
Eliza	United Kingdom	The ship was driven ashore and wrecked near South Shields. She was on a voyage from Gothenburg, Sweden to Aberystwyth, Cardiganshire.
Isabella	United Kingdom	The ship foundered in the North Sea off Whitby, Yorkshire.
Jemima	United Kingdom	The ship was driven ashore at South Shields.
John and Ann	United Kingdom	The ship was driven ashore and wrecked at Scarborough, Yorkshire with the loss of a crew member.
Lark	United Kingdom	The ship was driven ashore and wrecked at Bridlington, Yorkshire.
Mary	United Kingdom	The ship was wrecked at Scarborough. Her crew were rescued by the Scarborough Lifeboat. She was on a voyage from Great Yarmouth, Norfolk, to Grangemouth, Stirlingshire. Her crew were rescued by the Scarborough Lifeboat.
Matilda	United Kingdom	The ship foundered in the North Sea off Whitby.
Matthew	United Kingdom	The ship was driven ashore at Bridlington.
Nancy	United Kingdom	The ship was driven ashore and wrecked at Beaumaris, Anglesey Her crew were rescued. She was on a voyage from Messina, Kingdom of Sicily to Liverpool, Lancashire.
Providence	United Kingdom	The ship was driven ashore and wrecked 4 nautical miles (7.4 km) south of Huntcliff Foot, Yorkshire. Her crew were rescued.
Recovery	United Kingdom	The sloop was lost off Spurn Point, Yorkshire. Her crew were rescued.
Salisbury	United Kingdom	The transport ship was wrecked on the Kentish Knock, in the North Sea, with the loss of 241 of the 251 people on board.
Sophia	United Kingdom	The ship was driven ashore at Saltburn, Yorkshire. Her crew were rescued.
Udacy of Ury	United Kingdom	The ship was driven ashore at South Shields. She was later refloated and taken in to Sunderland, County Durham.
Waldemar	Royal Navy	The 94-gun ship of the line ran aground on a sandbank in the North Sea and was nearly wrecked.
William	United Kingdom	The brig was driven ashore and wrecked 4 nautical miles (7.4 km) south of Huntcliff Foot, Yorkshire. Her crew were rescued.
William	United Kingdom	The stores ship was lost in the Gut of Canso. Her crew were rescued.
Two unnamed vessels	United Kingdom	The ships were driven ashore at Skinningrove.

=== 12 November ===
List of shipwrecks: 12 November 1807
Ship	State	Description
Goodintent	United Kingdom	The ship departed from South Shields, County Durham, for London. No further trace, presumed foundered in the North Sea with the loss of all hands.
Unnamed	United Kingdom	The sloop was damaged by fire at Hull, Yorkshire.
Unnamed	United Kingdom	The brig sank off Whitby, Yorkshire with the loss of all hands.
Several unnamed vessels	United Kingdom	Eight or nine Humber Keels sank off Whitby with the loss of all hands.

=== 13 November ===
List of shipwrecks: 13 November 1807
Ship	State	Description
Onix	United Kingdom	The ship was driven ashore on Götaland, Sweden. She was on a voyage from Saint Petersburg, Russia to London.
Shorn	United Kingdom	The transport ship was in collision with another vessel and foundered in the English Channel off Dover, Kent. All on board were rescued.

=== 14 November ===
List of shipwrecks: 14 November 1807
Ship	State	Description
L'Actif	France	The privateer was captured in the Dogger Bank by HMRC Carrier (United Kingdom). L'Actif was ordered in to Great Yarmouth, Norfolk, United Kingdom, but was presumed to have subsequently foundered.

=== 15 November ===
List of shipwrecks: 15 November 1807
Ship	State	Description
Ann, or Anne	United Kingdom	The brig was driven ashore and wrecked in the Isles of Scilly She was on a voyage from Plymouth, Devon to Cork.
Joseph Harden	United Kingdom	The fishing coble was driven ashore at Aldborough, Yorkshire.
Tamer	United Kingdom	The brig was driven ashore and wrecked in the Isles of Scilly She was on a voyage from Plymouth to Cork.
Vrow Anna	Sweden	The ship departed from Arendal, Norway for Gothenburg. No further trace, presumed foundered with the loss of all hands.

=== 16 November ===
List of shipwrecks: 16 November 1807
Ship	State	Description
Ann	United Kingdom	The brig was wrecked in the Isles of Scilly. Her crew were rescued.
Eliza	United Kingdom	The ship was driven ashore and capsized at Hamoaze, Devon.
James	United Kingdom	The ship was driven ashore and wrecked at Waxholme, Yorkshire with the loss of all on board. She was on a voyage from Leith, Lothian, to Newcastle upon Tyne, Northumberland.
Leeds	United Kingdom	The ship ran aground on the Middle Ground. She was on a voyage from Saint Petersburgh, Russia to London. She was refloated the next day with assistance from the schooner Quail (United Kingdom) and HMS Vanguard (Royal Navy).
Tamer	United Kingdom	The brig was wrecked in the Isles of Scilly. Her crew were rescued.
Victory	United Kingdom	The ship was wrecked at Pictou, British North America. Her crew were rescued.

=== 18 November ===
List of shipwrecks: 18 November 1807
Ship	State	Description
American	United States	The schooner was wrecked at Bilbao, Spain. She was on a voyage from New York to Bilbao.
Prince of Wales	Royal Navy	The sloop was wrecked at Blackrock, Dublin. There were sixteen survivors from around 190 people on board.
Venus	Portugal	Napoleonic Wars: The ship was captured and burnt by Manche (French Navy). She was on a voyage from Porto to London, United Kingdom.

=== 19 November ===
List of shipwrecks: 19 November 1807
Ship	State	Description
Betsey	United Kingdom	The ship was wrecked near Dungarvan, county Waterford. Her crew were rescued. She was on a voyage from Cork to Gothenburg, Sweden.
Ceres	United Kingdom	The ship was driven ashore and wrecked at Coldingham, Berwickshire, with the loss of seven of the nine people on board.
Fame	United Kingdom	The ship sprang a leak and was abandoned by her crew. She was on a voyage from Lisbon, Portugal, to Dublin.
Hazard	United Kingdom	The ship was wrecked on the west coast of the Isle of Man south of Port Erin with the loss of eight of her crew.
Juno	United Kingdom	The brig was wrecked on Sanda Island. Her crew were rescued. She was on a voyage from Dublin to Londonderry.
Luna	United Kingdom	The ship was driven ashore at Aberdeen. She was on a voyage from Montreal, Lower Canada, British North America to Aberdeen.
Unity	United Kingdom	The ship was driven ashore near St. Mary's, Isles of Scilly. She was on a voyage from Bristol, Gloucestershire, to Plymouth, Devon. Unity was later refloated.
Velocity	United Kingdom	The ship foundered in the Irish Sea with the loss of all hands. She was on a voyage from Cork to London.

=== 20 November ===
List of shipwrecks: 20 November 1807
Ship	State	Description
Active	United Kingdom	The ship was lost near St Abb's Head, Berwickshire.
Ann	United Kingdom	The ship was driven ashore and wrecked at Newquay, Cornwall, with the loss of three of her crew. She was on a voyage from London to Bristol, Gloucestershire.
Barbara	United Kingdom	The ship was driven ashore and wrecked at Thornton, Fife. Her crew were rescued.
Barbara	United Kingdom	The ship was wrecked near Aberdeen. Her crew were rescued.
Bonito	(United Kingdom of Great Britain and Ireland) Malta	The transport ship was abandoned in the English Channel off Ramsgate, Kent. All fourteen people on board were rescued. She was subsequently brought in to Great Yarmouth, Norfolk.
Ceres	United Kingdom	The ship was lost whilst on a voyage from the Orkney Islands to Peterhead, Aberdeenshire.
Diana	United Kingdom	The transport ship sank at Ramsgate.
Falmouth	United Kingdom	The ship was driven ashore at Montevideo.
Glasgow	United Kingdom	The ship ran aground on the Boots Rocks, in the North Sea off Hartley, Northumberland with the loss of a crew member. She was on a voyage from Gothenburg, Sweden to Leith, Lothian. She was later refloated and brought in to Blyth, Northumberland.
Hope	United Kingdom	The hospital ship foundered in the North Sea off Lowestoft, Suffolk with the loss of all but one of those on board.
Malta	United Kingdom	The ship was driven ashore and severely damaged at Portsmouth. She was on a voyage from Leith to Malta. The ship was later refloated.
Mary	United Kingdom	The ship was severely damaged at Dublin.
Mary	United Kingdom	The ship was wrecked near Hartlepool, County Durham. Her crew were rescued.
Naomi	United Kingdom	The ship was driven ashore at Truro, Cornwall. She was on a voyage from London to Bristol, Gloucestershire.
Neptune	(United Kingdom of Great Britain and Ireland) Jersey	The brig was wrecked near Cardigan. Her crew were rescued.
Neptune	United Kingdom	The ship was driven ashore near Bridlington. Her crew were rescued. She was on a voyage from London to Whitby.
Powell	United Kingdom	The ship foundered in the Irish Sea with the loss of all hands.
Prince of Wales	United Kingdom	The sloop was sunk on the South Bull, in the Irish Sea off Dublin with the loss of over 150 lives.
Rochdale	United Kingdom	The brig was wrecked at Blackrock, Dublin with the loss of all 265 people on board.
Tryal	United Kingdom	The ship was severely damaged at Dublin.
Velocity	United Kingdom	The ship foundered whilst on a voyage from Cork to London.
Vrow Anna	Flag unknown	The ship was blown out to sea from Heligoland. No further trace, presumed foundered.

=== 21 November ===
List of shipwrecks: 21 November 1807
Ship	State	Description
Draper	United Kingdom	The ship was driven ashore and wrecked at Milford, Pembrokeshire. She was on a voyage from Bristol, Gloucestershire, to Cardiff, Glamorgan.
Richard	United Kingdom	The ship was driven ashore at Milford. She was on a voyage from Burry, Glamorgan to Pwllheli, Caernarvonshire.
Sisters	United Kingdom	The ship was driven ashore at Milford. She was on a voyage from Bristol to Greenock, Renfrewshire.
Triton	United Kingdom	The ship was wrecked near Marstrand, Sweden. She was on a voyage from Saint Petersburgh, Russia to Helsingør, Denmark.

=== 22 November ===
List of shipwrecks: 22 November 1807
Ship	State	Description
Alexander	United Kingdom	The hospital ship exploded and sank in the Atlantic Ocean with the loss of about 90 lives. There were 21 survivors.
Charles	United Kingdom	The ship is presumed to have foundered off the coast of Cornwall with the loss of all but the ship's dog.
Dove	United Kingdom	The brigantine ran aground at the Birling Gap, Sussex and was wrecked. Her crew survived. She was on a voyage from Jersey, Channel Islands, to London.
Friendship	United Kingdom	The brigantine was driven ashore and wrecked at Seaford, Sussex. Her crew were resscued. She was on a voyage from Jersey to Scarborough, Yorkshire.
Goodintent	United Kingdom	The ship was driven ashore and wrecked at Bude, Cornwall.
Unnamed	United Kingdom	The brig was discovered crewless in the Swin. She was taken in to Harwich, Essex, United Kingdom in a sinking condition.

=== 23 November ===
List of shipwrecks: 23 November 1807
Ship	State	Description
Alert	United Kingdom	The ship ran aground on the Herd Sand, in the North Sea off South Shields, County Durham. Her crew were rescued. She was on a voyage from Malta to South Shields. She was later refloated.
Ann	United Kingdom	The brig was driven ashore on Teurn Island, near Arendal, Norway. She later floated off and was captured by the Danes.
Ann and Mary	United Kingdom	The brig was driven onto rocks at Ryhope, County Durham. She was later refloated and taken in to Sunderland for repairs.
Dove	United Kingdom	The ship was lost near Newhaven, Sussex. Her crew were rescued. She was on a voyage from Jersey, Channel Islands, to London.
Ely	United Kingdom	The schooner was driven ashore at Whitby, Yorkshire. Her crew were rescued by the Whitby Lifeboat. She was on a voyage from Hull, Yorkshire to Newcastle-upon-Tyne, Northumberland.
Mary	United Kingdom	The ship was driven ashore and wrecked at Hartlepool, County Durham. Her crew were rescued.
Samuel	United Kingdom	The ship was driven ashore and wrecked on Teurn Island, Near Arendal, Norway.
16 unnamed vessels	Flags unknown	The ships were driven ashore between Whitby and Sunderland, County Durham.

=== 24 November ===
List of shipwrecks: 24 November 1807
Ship	State	Description
Unnamed	United Kingdom	The ship was driven ashore at Coatham, Yorkshire. Her six crew were rescued by the Redcar Lifeboat.

=== 25 November ===
List of shipwrecks: 25 November 1807
Ship	State	Description
Ant	United Kingdom	The ship was wrecked at the mouth of the River Tees. Her crew were rescued. She was on a voyage from Blakeney, Norfolk, to Leith, Lothian.
Duke of Athol	United Kingdom	The packet ship was wrecked at Warrenpoint, County Antrim. She was on a voyage from Liverpool, Lancashire, to the Isle of Man.
Transporten	Sweden	The ship departed from Gothenburg for Dublin, United Kingdom. No further trace, presumed foundered with the loss of all hands.

=== 26 November ===
List of shipwrecks: 26 November 1807
Ship	State	Description
Aurora	United Kingdom	The ship capsized at Jamaica, and was condemned.

=== 28 November ===
List of shipwrecks: 28 November 1807
Ship	State	Description
HMS Boreas	Royal Navy	The Laurel-class post ship struck the Hanois rocks south west of Guernsey, Channel Islands and was wrecked with the loss of her captain and all but 77 of her 155 crew.
Calliope	United Kingdom	The ship was driven ashore and wrecked at Winterton-on-Sea, Norfolk. All on board were rescued. She was on a voyage from Leith, Lothian, to Jamaica.
Coke	United Kingdom	The ship was driven ashore at Winterton-on-Sea. All on boared were rescued. She was on a voyage from Hull, Yorkshire to London.
Friendship	United Kingdom	The ship was driven ashore and wrecked near St. Bees, Cumberland. She was on a voyage from Dublin to Whitehaven, Cumberland.
Hawke	United Kingdom	The ship was driven ashore at Winterton-on-Sea.
Lady Warren	United Kingdom	The ship was wrecked in the Caicos Islands. Her crew were rescued.
Louisa	United Kingdom	The ship was driven ashore and wrecked at Aberporth, Cardiganshire, with the loss of all five of her crew.
Nelson	United Kingdom	The ship was driven ashore at Caister-on-Sea, Norfolk. Her crew were rescued.
Oak	United Kingdom	The ship was driven ashore near Great Yarmouth, Norfolk. Her crew were rescued.
Three Brothers	United Kingdom	The transport ship was driven ashore at Great Yarmouth with the loss of a crew member.

=== 29 November ===
List of shipwrecks: 29 November 1807
Ship	State	Description
Apollo	United Kingdom	The ship was driven ashore and wrecked near Southwold, Suffolk, with the loss of two of her crew. She was on a voyage from Sunderland, County Durham, to Sandwich, Kent.

=== 30 November ===
List of shipwrecks: 30 November 1807
Ship	State	Description
Charlotte	United Kingdom	War of the Fourth Coalition: The ship was captured by Caroline (French Navy). She was set afire and sunk.

=== Unknown date ===
List of shipwrecks: Unknown date in November 1807
Ship	State	Description
Alexandria	United Kingdom	The ship foundered in the North Sea off Goree, Zeeland, Kingdom of Holland. She was on a voyage from Alexandria, Egypt to Rotterdam, South Holland, Kingdom of Holland.
Annabella	United Kingdom	The ship was wrecked in Killalla Bay. She was on a voyage from Glasgow, Renfrewshire, to Sligo.
Anna Maria	United Kingdom	The ship was wrecked at Portrush, County Antrim. She was on a voyage from Liverpool, Lancashire, to Westport, County Mayo.
Appletree	United Kingdom	The ship was lost near St. Ives, Cornwall. She was on a voyage from Bristol to Dartmouth, Devon.
Atalanta	United Kingdom	The ship was lost near St. Ives with the loss of four of her crew. She was on a voyage from Plymouth, Devon, to Bristol, Gloucestershire.
Bellisarius	Russia	The ship was wrecked on Domesnes, Norway. She was on a voyage from Riga to Liverpool.
Bird	United Kingdom	The ship ran aground on the Herd Sand, in the North Sea off the coast of County Durham. She was later refloated and taken in to South Shields, County Durham.
Blessing	United Kingdom	The ship was driven ashore at Bridlington, Yorkshire. Her crew were rescued. She was on a voyage from London to Whitby, Yorkshire.
Bridgewater	United Kingdom	The ship was wrecked at Holyhead, Anglesey.
Brilhante	Portugal	The ship was wrecked at Porto. She was on a voyage from Porto to London.
Brilliant	United Kingdom	The ship was wrecked on the Stonescar Rocks, in the North Sea.
Brilliant	United Kingdom	The ship was lost in the Gulf of Finland. Her crew were rescued. She was on a voyage from Hull, Yorkshire to Saint Petersburg, Russia.
Britannia	United Kingdom	The brig was driven ashore and wrecked at Whitby.
Brothers	United Kingdom	The ship was driven onto the Barbar Sand, in the North Sea and was wrecked. She was on a voyage from Hull to Gibraltar. She was later refloated and beached at Caister-on-Sea, Norfolk.
Ceres	United Kingdom	The ship was driven ashore at Beaumaris, Anglesey. She was on a voyage from Whitehaven, Cumberland, to the West Indies.
Charlotte or Poloma	Portugal	Napoleonic Wars: The ship was captured and burnt by two French Navy frigates. She was on a voyage from Lisbon to Madeira and London.
Christopher	United Kingdom	The ship was driven ashore at Inverness.
Cognac Packet	United Kingdom	The ship was driven ashore in the Humber. She was on a voyage from South Shields, to Gibraltar. Cognac Packet was later refloated and put into Hull.
Concord	United Kingdom	The ship was driven ashore near Bridlington.
Cromwell	United Kingdom	The ship foundered in the North Sea off Lowestoft, Suffolk. She was on a voyage from Selby, Yorkshire to London.
Dependence	United Kingdom	The ship was driven ashore and wrecked near Deal Castle, Kent. She was on a voyage from London to Gibraltar.
Devonish	United Kingdom	The ship was driven ashore and damaged at Plymouth, Devon. She was on a voyage from Porto to London. Devonish was later refloated and taken in to Plymouth.
Draper	United Kingdom	The ship ran aground on the West Hoyle Bank, in Liverpool Bay. She was on a voyage from New York, United States to Liverpool.
Eleanora	United Kingdom	The ship was driven ashore at Longhope, Orkney Islands. She was on a voyage from Liverpool to Gothenburg, Sweden.
Eliza	United States	The ship foundered in the North Sea off Vlieland, Friesland, Kingdom of Holland. She was on a voyage from Wilmington, Delaware, to Rotterdam.
Eliza	United Kingdom	The ship was driven ashore at St. Ives, Cornwall. She was on a voyage from Plymouth to a Welsh port.
Ellen	United Kingdom	The ship was driven ashore at Liverpool and was severely damaged. She was on a voyage from Liverpool to Haiti. Ellen was later refloated.
Endeavour	United Kingdom	The sloop foundered in the North Sea off the mouth of the River Tees with the loss of all hands.
Enigheten	Sweden	The ship was driven ashore and wrecked at Harwich, Essex, United Kingdom.
Fame	United Kingdom	The ship ran aground off Killough, County Down. She was on a voyage from Rothesay, Bute to Galway.
Favourite	United Kingdom	The ship was driven ashore on the British coast. She was on a voyage from Onega, Russia, to London. Favourite was later refloated and towed into Harwich, Essex in a wrecked condition.
Fly	United Kingdom	The ship was driven ashore near Whitby. Her crew were rescued by the Whitby Lifeboat. Fly was on a voyage from Hull to Newcastle upon Tyne, Northumberland. Fly was later refloated and taken in to Whitby for repairs.
Flying Fish	United Kingdom	The ship was driven ashore near Whitby. She was later refloated and taken in to Whitby for repairs.
Freedom	United Kingdom	The ship was driven ashore at Bridlington.
Friends	United Kingdom	The ship was driven ashore near Holyhead. She was on a voyage from Ayr to Dublin.
Friends Adventure	United Kingdom	The ship was driven ashore at Littlehampton, Sussex. She was on a voyage from London to Bristol.
Friendship	United Kingdom	The ship was driven ashore and wrecked at Winterton-on-Sea, Norfolk. Her crew were rescued. She was on a voyage from Saint Petersburg to London.
General Suwara	United Kingdom	The ship was driven ashore at Bideford, Devon. She was on a voyage from Cork to Liverpool.
Griffin	United Kingdom	The whaler was driven ashore near Portsmouth, Hampshire. She was on a voyage from London to the South Seas. Griffin was later refloated and taken in to Cowes, Isle of Wight.
Hardy's	United Kingdom	The ship reportedly was driven ashore and wrecked at Harwich, Essex. She was on a voyage from Arkhangelsk, Russia to London. She was repaired and returned to sailing only to be lost in 1822.
Helena	United Kingdom	The ship was lost in Killala Bay. She was on a voyage from Beaumaris, Anglesey, to Sligo.
Henry	United Kingdom	The ship was wrecked near Copenhagen, Denmark.
Hero	United Kingdom	The ship was wrecked near Libava, Courland Governorate. Her crew were rescued. She was on a voyage from Saint Petersburgh, Russia to Portsmouth, Hampshire.
Hope	United Kingdom	The ship was wrecked at Porto. She was on a voyage from Porto to London.
Industry	United Kingdom	The ship was driven ashore near Deal, Kent. She was on a voyage from London to Bristol. Industry was refloated on 15 November and taken in to Ramsgate, Kent.
Jane	United Kingdom	The ship was driven ashore in Riga Bay. She was on a voyage from Saint Petersburg to Greenock, Renfrewshire.
Janet and Mary	United Kingdom	The ship was driven ashore at Inverness.
John	United Kingdom	The ship was driven ashore and wrecked on the coast of Anglesey.
John and Ann	United Kingdom	The ship foundered in the North Sea off Scarborough, Yorkshire.
Le Rodeaux	France	The privateer ran aground and was wrecked at Brouwershaven, Zeeland, Kingdom of Holland with the loss of 25 lives.
Margarett	United Kingdom	The brig was driven ashore and wrecked on Anglesey with the loss of all hands.
Martha	United Kingdom	The ship was wrecked on the coast of Jutland. She was on a voyage from Plymouth, Devon, to Copenhagen, Denmark.
Mary	United Kingdom	The ship foundered in the North Sea off Scarborough.
Mary	United Kingdom	The ship sank at Ramsgate.
Maryann, or Mary Ann	United Kingdom	The ship was driven ashore near Bridlington.
Maryann	United Kingdom	The ship was driven ashore and wrecked. Her crew were rescued. She was on a voyage from Chepstow, Monmouthshire to an Irish port.
Mary Gore	United Kingdom	The ship was lost near Londonderry. She was on a voyage from Stockholm, Sweden to Dublin.
Mervin	United Kingdom	The ship was driven ashore in Youghall Bay. She was on a voyage from Bristol to Surinam.
Minerva	United Kingdom	The ship was lost on the Portuguese coast.
Monticello	United States	The ship was driven ashore on Texel, North Holland, Kingdom of Holland.
Munificence	United Kingdom	The ship foundered in the Gulf of Bothnia in early November with the loss of all hands.
Nancy	United Kingdom	The ship was wrecked near Inverness.
Providence	United Kingdom	The transport ship was wrecked on the Long Sand, in the North Sea off Deal, Kent.
Queen	United Kingdom	The ship was wrecked on the coast of Zealand, Denmark. She was on a voyage from Dundee, Forfarshire, to a Baltic port.
Roslin Castle	United Kingdom	The ship was wrecked near Inverness.
Samuel	United Kingdom	The ship was wrecked near Inverness.
Santa Rita	Portugal	The ship foundered in the English Channel off South Foreland, Kent, United Kingdom. Her crew were rescued. She was on a voyage from Riga to Viana do Castelo.
Senhora de Guia	Portugal	Peninsular War: The ship was captured by a Spanish privateer and was subsequently lost near Bilbao, Spain. she was on a voyage from Porto to an English port.
Success	United Kingdom	The ship was driven ashore near Gothenburg, Sweden. She was on a voyage from Riga to Hull, Yorkshire.
Susan	United Kingdom	The ship was wrecked on the coast of Jutland. Her crew were rescued. She was on a voyage from a Baltic port to London.
Thorn	United Kingdom	The transport ship was run donw and sunk off Dover, Kent. All on board were rescued.
Ulysses	(United States) Louisiana Territory	The ship was driven ashore and wrecked near Deal. She was on a voyage from Tönningen, Duchy of Holstein to New York, United States.
Vigilant	United Kingdom	The ship was wrecked at St. Ives, Cornwall. She was on a voyage from St. Ives to Liverpool.
William	United Kingdom	The ship was driven ashore and wrecked at Helsingborg, Sweden.
William and Mary	United Kingdom	The ship was wrecked near Padstow, Cornwall. Her crew were rescued.
William Penn	United States	The ship was driven ashore near Tönningen. She was on a voyage from Tönningen to Virginia.
Woodside	United Kingdom	The ship was driven ashore near Girvan, Ayrshire. She was on a voyage from Glasgow, Renfrewshire to Belfast, County Antrim.

== December ==
=== 2 December ===
List of shipwrecks: 2 December 1807
Ship	State	Description
Nancy	United Kingdom	The ship was in collision with Fortitude (United Kingdom) in the North Sea and foundered. Her crew were rescued. She was on a voyage from Montrose, Forfarshire, to Sunderland, County Durham.

=== 3 December ===
List of shipwrecks: 3 December 1807
Ship	State	Description
Thomas and Ann	United Kingdom	The ship sprang a leak and was beached on the coast of Yorkshire.

=== 4 December ===
List of shipwrecks: 4 December 1807
Ship	State	Description
Adolphe	France	War of the Fourth Coalition: The privateer was captured by HMS Leda (Royal Navy). She was subsequently driven ashore at Bembridge, Isle of Wight. Adolphe was later refloated and taken in to Portsmouth, Hampshire.
Speedwell	United Kingdom	The ship was wrecked on the coast of Jutland, Denmark. Her crew were rescued but taken prisoner She was on a voyage from Saint Petersburg, Russia to London.

=== 5 December ===
List of shipwrecks: 5 December 1807
Ship	State	Description
Henrietta	Sweden	The ship ran aground in the Vlie. Her crew were rescued. She was on a voyage from Stockholm to London.

=== 6 December ===
List of shipwrecks: 6 December 1807
Ship	State	Description
Cæsar	United Kingdom	War of the Fourth Coalition: The privateer was captured by Caroline (French Navy). She was set afire and sunk.

=== 7 December ===
List of shipwrecks: 7 December 1807
Ship	State	Description
Friends	United Kingdom	The ship was lost near St. Ives, Cornwall.
Hendra	United Kingdom	The ship was lost near St. Ives.
Mary	United Kingdom	The ship was lost near St Ives.
Spraycomb	United Kingdom	The ship was driven ashore at Hayle, Cornwall.

=== 8 December ===
List of shipwrecks: 8 December 1807
Ship	State	Description
Amicus	United Kingdom	The ship was driven ashore and wrecked on the Holderness coast, Yorkshire with the loss of four lives. She was on a voyage from Saint Petersburg, Russia to Hull, Yorkshire.
Jason	United Kingdom	The ship was driven ashore on the Holderness coast. Her crew were rescued. She was on a voyage from Wyburg to King's Lynn, Norfolk.
Kingston	United Kingdom	The ship ran aground off the coast of Lincolnshire. Her crew were rescued. She was on a voyage from Riga, russia to Hull. Kingston was later refloated and taken in to Hull.

=== 10 December ===
List of shipwrecks: 10 December 1807
Ship	State	Description
Otter	United Kingdom	The ship sprang a leak in the Atlantic Ocean. She was set fire to and abandoned. Otter was on a voyage from Saint Kitts to Liverpool.

=== 11 December ===
List of shipwrecks: 11 December 1807
Ship	State	Description
Jane	United Kingdom	The ship foundered in the Solway Firth with the loss of all hands. She was on a voyage from Whitehaven, Cumberland, to Annan, Dumfriesshire.

=== 18 December ===
List of shipwrecks: 18 December 1807
Ship	State	Description
President Ince	United Kingdom	The ship sprang a leak and was abandoned. Her crew were rescued by Mary (United Kingdom). President Ince was on a voyage from Barbados to Cork.

=== 19 December ===
List of shipwrecks: 19 December 1807
Ship	State	Description
Hercules	United Kingdom	The ship foundered in the Atlantic Ocean. Her crew were rescued by HMS Hope (Royal Navy). She was on a voyage from Antigua to London.

=== 20 December ===
List of shipwrecks: 20 December 1807
Ship	State	Description
Jupiter	United Kingdom	The transport ship was driven ashore on the Isle of Wight.

=== 25 December ===
List of shipwrecks: 25 December 1807
Ship	State	Description
Hercules	Sweden	The ship was sighted off "Kelsea". No further trace, presumed foundered with the loss of all hands. She was on a voyage from Uddevalla to Hull, Yorkshire, United Kingdom.
Perseverance	United Kingdom	Napoleonic Wars: The ship was captured and burnt by Hermione and Hortense (both French Navy). Perseverance was on a voyage from Trinidad to Halifax, Nova Scotia, British North America.

=== 26 December ===
List of shipwrecks: 26 December 1807
Ship	State	Description
Erin	United States	The ship was lost at the mouth of the Gironde with the loss of all but one of her crew. She was on a voyage from Baltimore, Maryland, to Bordeaux, Gironde, France.

=== 27 December ===
List of shipwrecks: 27 December 1807
Ship	State	Description
Rising Sun	United Kingdom	The ship was driven ashore and damaged at Kinsale, County Cork. She was later refloated.

=== 28 December ===
List of shipwrecks: 28 December 1807
Ship	State	Description
Elizabeth	United Kingdom	The ship was wrecked in the Orkney Islands. Her crew were rescued. She was on a voyage from Quebec City, Lower Canada, British North America to Liverpool, Lancashire.
Endeavour	United Kingdom	The ship was lost in the Humber. She was on a voyage from Gainsborough, Lincolnshire, to Hull, Yorkshire.
Henrietta Charlotta	Portugal	The ship was driven ashore and wrecked at Millbay, Plymouth, Devon, United Kingdom. She was on a voyage from Lisbon to London
Orion	United Kingdom	The brig was wrecked in Millbay. Her crew were rescued. She was on a voyage from London to the West Indies.
Susan	United States	The ship was driven ashore in the Truro River, United Kingdom.

=== 29 December ===
List of shipwrecks: 29 December 1807
Ship	State	Description
HMS Anson	Royal Navy	HMS Anson. The 44-gun fifth-rate frigate was wrecked off The Loe, Cornwall, England, with the loss of between 60 and 190 of her crew.
Antiope	United Kingdom	The transport ship was driven ashore and wrecked in St. Bride's Bay with the loss of seven lives. There were at least 243 survivors.
Glenfacchen	United Kingdom	The ship foundered in the Irish Sea with the loss of all on board. She was on a voyage from Liverpool, Lancashire, to Londonderry.
Maryann	United States	The ship was driven ashore at Southsea, Hampshire, United Kingdom.
Sarah Ann	United Kingdom	The ship was driven ashore at Southsea.

=== 31 December ===
List of shipwrecks: 31 December 1807
Ship	State	Description
Active	United Kingdom	The brig was driven ashore at Weymouth, Dorset. She was later refloated and taken in to Weymouth.
Augusta	United Kingdom	The ship was wrecked on the North Bull, in the Irish Sea off County Dublin with the loss of four of her crew.
Fair Eliza	United States	The ship was wrecked on Mayaguana. She was on a voyage from Africa to Charleston, South Carolina.
Hercules	Portugal	The ship was detained by Greyhound ( (United Kingdom of Great Britain and Ireland) Guernsey), operating under a letter of marque. She was subsequently wrecked at Tralee, County Kerry, United Kingdom with the loss of six of her crew and two from Greyhound. Hercules was on a voyage from Rio de Janeiro, Colonial Brazil to Lisbon.
Little Watt	United States	The ship was driven ashore on "Bulls Breakers" and was wrecked. She was on a voyage from Africa to Charleston, South Carolina.
Nancy	United Kingdom	The schooner was driven ashore and wrecked at Plymouth, Devon. She was on a voyage from Newfoundland, British North America to Poole, Dorset.

=== Unknown date ===
List of shipwrecks: Unknown date in December 1807
Ship	State	Description
Adolphe	France	The French prize was on her way to Britain when she ran on shore at Bembridge Ledge. Initially there was little hope of getting her off, but despite the earlier reports, Adolphe was gotten off and was brought into Portsmouth a few days later.
Adventure	United Kingdom	The ship was driven ashore and damaged near Plymouth, Devon. She was later refloated.
Alarm	United Kingdom	The ship was wrecked on the Burbo Bank, in the Mersey Estuary with the loss of all hands. She was on a voyage from Cork to Liverpool, Lancashire.
Alarm	United Kingdom	The ship was destroyed by fire at Canton, China early in December.
Albion	United Kingdom	The country ship was destroyed by fire at Canton, China. She was carrying a valuable cargo of silks and dollars.
Albion	United Kingdom	The ship was abandoned in the Atlantic Ocean. Her crew were rescued by Magnet (United Kingdom). Albion was on a voyage from Grenada to London.
Ann	United Kingdom	The ship caught fire and exploded off the coast of Africa with the loss of over 100 lives, mostly slaves.
Aurora	United Kingdom	The ship struck the Carr Rock, in the North Sea and foundered. She was on a voyage from London to Great Yarmouth, Norfolk, and Grangemouth, Stirlingshire.
Bee	United Kingdom	The ship was lost at Cape Cod, Massachusetts, United States.
Catharina Dorothea	flag unknown	The ship was driven ashore near "Holmstadt", Sweden. She was on a voyage from London to a Baltic port.
Ceres	United Kingdom	The ship was driven ashore at Weymouth, Dorset.
Clio	United Kingdom	The ship was driven ashore on the coast of Manche, France. Her crew were rescued but made prisoners. She was on a voyage from London to Tobago
Confidence	United Kingdom	The ship was driven ashore at Barnstaple, Devon, with the loss of all hands. She was on a voyage from Barnstaple to Greenock, Renfrewshire.
Dove	United Kingdom	The brig was wrecked at Beachy Head, Sussex. Her crew were rescued. She was on a voyage from Jersey, Channel Islands, to London.
Draper	United Kingdom	The ship was driven ashore near Harwich, Essex. Her crew were rescued. She was on a voyage from Newcastle upon Tyne, Northumberland to Dover, Kent.
Endeavour	United Kingdom	The transport ship foundered in the North Sea off Heligoland.
Elizabeth	United Kingdom	The ship was driven ashore at Pwllheli, Caernarfonshire. She was on a voyage from Dublin to Bristol, Gloucestershire.
Ellis	United Kingdom	The ship was lost at Domesnes, Norway.
Friends	United Kingdom	The ship foundered off Hayle, Cornwall with the loss of all hands.
Friendship	United Kingdom	The ship was lost near the Isle of Man. She was on a voyage from Dublin to Whitehaven, Cumberland.
Friendship	United Kingdom	The ship foundered off Hayle with the loss of all on board. She was on a voyage from Plymouth to a Welsh port.
Gracia Divina	Portugal	War of the Fourth Coalition: The ship was captured by the privateer Bellona (France) whilst on a voyage from Porto to London. She subsequently foundered in the Bay of Biscay off Gijón, Spain.
Generous Friends	United Kingdom	The ship ran aground and was wrecked on the Arklow Bank, in the Irish Sea. She was on a voyage from Liverpool to Waterford.
Glatton	United Kingdom	The East Indiaman ran agroud in the English Channel off the French coast. She was refloated and taken in to The Downs.
Harriet	United Kingdom	The ship was wrecked on Gotland, Sweden.
Harriet	United Kingdom	The ship ran aground on the Sandhammer Reef, Norway. Her crew were rescued.
Harriet and Ann	United Kingdom	The ship foundered off the Isles of Scilly. Her crew were rescued. She was on a voyage from Cornwall to Wales.
Henry	United Kingdom	The ship was lost between Padstow and Land's End, Cornwall with the loss of all hands. She was on a voyage from Wexford to London.
Jonge Martha	Sweden	The ship was driven ashore at "Fludstrand", Norway.
Lauzon	United Kingdom	The ship was driven ashore on Anticosti Island, Lower Canada, British North America. Her crew survived. She was on a voyage from Newfoundland to Quebec City, British North America.
Liberty	United Kingdom	The ship was driven ashore near Wexford. She was on a voyage from Wexford to Dublin.
Maria Charlotta	Sweden	The ship was driven ashore at Helsingborg. She was on a voyage from Gävle to London.
Marianne	United Kingdom	The coaster was lost on the Sussex coast. Her crew were rescued.
Mars	United Kingdom	The ship foundered in the North Sea whilst on a voyage from Great Yarmouth to a Scottish port.
Mary	United Kingdom	The ship foundered off Margate on or before 16 December.
Maryann, or Mary Ann	United Kingdom	The ship was lost near Dublin. Her crew were rescued.
Nordeskerman	Sweden	The ship was wrecked at Hoylake, Lancashire. She was on a voyage from Liverpool to Gothenburg.
Orion	Sweden	The brig was driven ashore on the Danish coast. She was on a voyage from Riga, Russia to Copenhagen, Denmark.
Otter	United Kingdom	The ship foundered whilst on a voyage from the Leeward Islands to London. Her crew were rescued.
Providence	United Kingdom	The ship was wrecked near Alnwick, Northumberland. She was reported to be on a voyage from Liverpool to Waterford.
Rachel and Lucy	United Kingdom	The ship was lost near Lough Swilly with the loss of all hands. She was on a voyage from Ballyraine, County Donegal, to Liverpool.
Ranger	United Kingdom	The ship was driven ashore on the Goodwick Sands, Pembrokeshire. She was on a voyage from Youghall, County Cork to Liverpool.
Ranger	United Kingdom	The ship foundered in the River Severn at Purton, Berkeley, Gloucestershire.
Rothe Duna	Russia	The ship was wrecked in Læsø, Denmark. She was on a voyage from Riga to Liverpool.
Samaritan	United States	The ship was lost near Vlissingen, Zeeland, Kingdom of Holland. Her crew were rescued. She was on a voyage from New York to Antwerp, Deux-Nèthes, France.
Samuel	United Kingdom	The ship was wrecked at Cape Purre with the loss of all but one of her crew. She was on a voyage from London to Quebec.
Sophia	Denmark-Norway	The ship was wrecked at Flekkerøy. She was on a voyage from the Øresund to London.
Swallow	United Kingdom	The brig foundered off the Isles of Scilly. Her crew were rescued. She was on a voyage from Cornwall to Wales.
Thomas and Ann	United Kingdom	The ship was driven ashore at Robin Hoods Bay, Yorkshire. Her crew were rescued. She was on a voyage from Sunderland, County Durham, to Yorkshire.
Two Sisters	Danzig	The ship ran aground on the Little Grounds, in the Baltic Sea. She was on a voyage from Memel, Prussia to London.
Union	United Kingdom	The ship was driven ashore and damaged near Plymouth. She was later refloated.
Windermere	United Kingdom	The transport ship was driven ashore at Messina, Sicily.
Yorrick	United States	The ship was driven ashore and wrecked on Texel, North Holland, Kingdom of Holland.

== Unknown date ==
List of shipwrecks: Unknown date in 1807
Ship	State	Description
Admiral Aplin	British East India Company	War of the Fourth Coalition: The East Indiaman was captured by the privateer Revenant (France) on 27 September. She had foundered off the Coromadel Coast by 15 October. Her crew were rescued by Clyde (United Kingdom).
Admiral Cochrane	United Kingdom	The ship was wrecked at Saint Domingo.
Albion	United Kingdom	A fire destroyed the ship between St. Lucia and Martinique as she was sailing from London to Jamaica. Her crew were rescued.
Albion	United Kingdom	The ship was wrecked at Trepassey, Newfoundland, British North America with the loss of all but one of her crew.
Albion	United Kingdom	The ship was abandoned whilst on a voyage from Grenada to London. Her crew were rescued by Magnet (United Kingdom).
Alexander	United Kingdom	The ship was run down and sunk in the Grand Banks of Newfoundland by Henry (United Kingdom). Her crew were rescued. She was on a voyage from Liverpool, Lancashire, to Boston, Massachusetts, United States.
Alexander	United Kingdom	The ship was driven ashore and wrecked on Long Island, New York, United States.
Amazon	Denmark-Norway	The ship was wrecked on Hainan, China. Her crew were rescued.
Benevolent	United Kingdom	The ship was wrecked on the coast of Newfoundland. she was on a voyage from Newfoundland to Boston, Massachusetts.
Bengal	United States	The ship ran aground on Gorretti Island, in the River Plate. She was later towed to Montevideo where she was wrecked.
Betsey	United Kingdom	The ship was destroyed by fire at Norfolk, Virginia, United States.
Blenheim	United Kingdom	The ship was reported to have foundered.
Bridgetown	United Kingdom	The ship was wrecked on the Cobler's Rocks, off Barbados. She was on a voyage from London to Jamaica.
Britannia	United Kingdom	The ship was wrecked on the coast of "New Holland" with some loss of life.
Brutus	United Kingdom	The ship was wrecked on Block Island, Rhode Island, United States. She was on a voyage from Liverpool to an American port.
Calcutta	United Kingdom	The ship was wrecked on the coast of New Guinea, She was on a voyage from Port Jackson, New South Wales to China.
Ceres	United Kingdom	The ship capsized off Cape Mesurado, Africa. Thirteen of her crew were rescued. She was on a voyage from Liverpool, Lancashire, to the West Indies.
Ceres	United Kingdom	The ship foundered with the loss of all hands. She was on a voyage from Newfoundland to an English port.
Charles	United Kingdom	The ship was wrecked on the coast of Cornwall.
Concord	United Kingdom	The ship foundered whilst on a voyage from St. Ubes, Spain to Newfoundland, British North America. Her crew were rescued.
Daniel	United Kingdom	The ship foundered off the Indian coast whilst bound for Calcutta. Her crew were rescued.
Dart	(United Kingdom of Great Britain and Ireland) Guernsey	The ship was lost in the River Plate.
Diana	United States	The ship sprang a leak and was abandoned by her crew. She was on a voyage from St. Ubes, Portugal to Baltimore, Maryland.
Diligence	United Kingdom	The ship was wrecked near Porthcawl, Glamorgan, with the loss of five of her seven crew. She was on a voyage from Bristol, Gloucestershire, to Padstow, Cornwall.
Doncet	(United Kingdom of Great Britain and Ireland) British North America	The schooner was lost in the Saint Lawrence River. Her crew were rescued.
Doubt	United Kingdom	The ship was wrecked on the coast of Labrador, British North America. Her crew survived. She was on a voyage from Quebec City, Lower Canada, British North America to London.
Dunlop	United Kingdom	The ship was lost in the Saint Lawrence River.
Duchess of York	United Kingdom	The ship was driven ashore in Baffos Bay, Africa.
Dunroben Castle	United Kingdom	The ship ran aground off Miramichi, New Brunswick, British North America. Her crew were rescued. She was on a voyage from Greenock, Renfrewshire, to Miramichi.
Eclipse	United Kingdom	The ship was lost in Courland Bay, Tobago. Her crew were rescued.
Economie	Hamburg	The ship was wrecked at Bordeaux, Gironde, France.
Edward	United Kingdom	The ship was wrecked at Archangelsk, Russia before 19 November.
Eliza Ann	United Kingdom	The ship was wrecked on Hainan with some loss of life.
Experiment	United Kingdom	The ship foundered.
Faithful Messenger	United Kingdom	The ship was wrecked on the coast of Cornwall.
Flora	United Kingdom	The ship was driven ashore on the coast of Florida, New Spain. She was on a voyage from New Orleans, Louisiana Territory.
Four Friends	United States	The ship was lost on Grand Caicos. Her crew were rescued. she was on a voyage from Charleston, South Carolina, to Jamaica.
General Don	(United Kingdom of Great Britain and Ireland) Jersey	The ship was wrecked on Glover's Reef, off the coast of British Honduras.
Harriet	Flag unknown	The brig, a prize, foundered in the Atlantic Ocean.
Hazard	United Kingdom	The ship was wrecked on the coast of Cornwall.
Henry	United Kingdom	The ship foundered off the American coast. Her crew were rescued. She was on a voyage from Havana, Cuba to an American port.
Hope	United Kingdom	The ship was wrecked in the Strait of Belle Isle. Survivors were rescued by Diana (United Kingdom).
Hope	United Kingdom	The ship was wrecked on the coast of Newfoundland. Her crew were rescued. She was on a voyage from Figueira da Foz, Portugal to Newfoundland.
HMS Ignition	Royal Navy	The fireship foundered with the loss of seven of her 23 crew.
Java	United Kingdom	The ship was reported to have foundered.
Jane	United States	The ship foundered whilst on a voyage from Tobago to Norfolk, Virginia. Her crew were rescued.
John	United Kingdom	The ship was lost at Pictou, Nova Scotia, British North America. Her crew were rescued.
John Jay	United States	The ship was lost in the Java Sea.
Lady Jane	United Kingdom	The ship foundered whilst on a voyage from Demerara to Waterford. Her crew were rescued by Sally (United Kingdom).
London	United Kingdom	The ship was lost in the Saint Lawrence River.
Lord Duncan	United Kingdom	The ship was destroyed by an explosion at Saint Domingo with the loss of two of her crew. She was on a voyage from Saint Domingo to London.
Martha	United Kingdom	The ship was wrecked in the Caicos Islands. Her crew were rescued.
Mary	United Kingdom	The ship was wrecked on the coast of Brazil. She was on a voyage from Montevideo to Virginia, United States.
Merchant	United States	The ship was abandoned by her crew. She was on a voyage from New York to Amsterdam, North Holland, Kingdom of Holland.
Mercury	United Kingdom	The ship was wrecked at Jamaica. She was on a voyage from Jamaica to London.
HMS Moucheron	Royal Navy	The ship foundered in the Mediterranean Sea in early 1807.
Nelly	United Kingdom	The ship was wrecked at Barbadoes.
Neptune	United Kingdom	The sloop foundered off Grenada.
Neptune	United Kingdom	Gunboat War: The ship was captured by the Danish. She subsequently came ashore near Copenhagen where she was set afire and destroyed by the Royal Navy.
Nercus	United Kingdom	The ship foundered in the Atlantic Ocean off Long Island, New York, United States.
Peggy	United Kingdom	The ship foundered whilst on a voyage from Jamaica to Liverpool. Her crew were rescued.
Polperro	United Kingdom	The ship was wrecked on the coast of Cornwall.
Prince Edward	United Kingdom	The ship was driven ashore and severely damaged at Jamaica. She was consequently condemned.
Prosperity	United Kingdom	The ship foundered in the Atlantic Ocean. All on board were rescued by Patriote (French Navy). Prosperity was on a voyage from an Irish port to New York.
Sally	(United States) Louisiana Territory	The ship foundered whilst on a voyage from New Orleans to Jamaica. Her crew were rescued.
Seaflower	United Kingdom	The ship was lost on the coast of Florida, New Spain. She was on a voyage from Jamaica to Havana and New York, United States.
Sir Charles Hamilton	United Kingdom	The ship was lost in the Turks Islands. She was on a voyage from Liverpool to Saint Domingo.
Sitha (Ситха, 'Sitka')	Russia	The ship was wrecked at the mouth of the Kamchatka River. The rescue of her crew was aided by transport ship Feodosy (Феодосий, Imperial Russian Navy).
Spy	United Kingdom	The ship was wrecked on the coast of Cuba. She was on a voyage from Málaga, Spain to Havana, Cuba.
Terrible	Navy of the Kingdom of Holland	The ship was wrecked at Batavia, Netherlands East Indies.
Venus	United Kingdom	The privateer was lost in the River Plate.
Warren Hastings	United Kingdom	The ship was wrecked on Île Bourbon.
William Phillips	United Kingdom	The ship foundered. Her crew were rescued by Bear (United Kingdom). William Phillips was on a voyage from Demerara to London.
Young Henry	United Kingdom	The ship was wrecked on the coast of Cornwall.
Five unnamed vessels	United Kingdom	The ships were wrecked at Archangelsk before 19 November.
