= List of shipwrecks in 1809 =

The list of shipwrecks in 1809 includes ships sunk, wrecked, or otherwise lost during 1809.

table of contents
1809
Jan	Feb	Mar	Apr
May	Jun	Jul	Aug
Sep	Oct	Nov	Dec
Unknown date

== January ==
=== 1 January ===
List of shipwrecks: 1 January 1809
Ship	State	Description
Cumberland	United Kingdom	Napoleonic Wars: The ship was captured by a French privateer and run onto rocks off Jersey, Channel Islands. She later refloated and was taken in to Jersey. Cumberland was on a voyage from Quebec City, Lower Canada, British North America to London.
Prometheus	United Kingdom	The ship was driven ashore on the coast of Jutland. She was refloated.

=== 2 January ===
List of shipwrecks: 2 January 1809
Ship	State	Description
Diligence	United Kingdom	The transport ship ran aground and was severely damaged. She was later refloated and put into Ramsgate, Kent.

=== 3 January ===
List of shipwrecks: 3 January 1809
Ship	State	Description
Cupid	United Kingdom	The sloop was driven ashore at Whitby, Yorkshire. Her crew were rescued. She was on a voyage from London to Whitby.
Lydia	United Kingdom	The ship departed from Falmouth, Cornwall for Malta. No further trace, presumed foundered with the loss of all hands.

=== 4 January ===
List of shipwrecks: 4 January 1809
Ship	State	Description
Agnes	Sweden	The bomb-tender was driven ashore at Kilnsea, Yorkshire, United Kingdom. She was later refloated and put into Hull, Yorkshire.
Francis	United Kingdom	The ship foundered in the Irish Sea off Wexford with the loss of all hands.
Nancy	United Kingdom	The brig foundered in the Isles of Scilly. She was on a voyage from a Welsh port to Plymouth, Devon.

=== 5 January ===
List of shipwrecks: 5 January 1809
Ship	State	Description
Francis	United Kingdom	The ship foundered in the Atlantic Ocean off the Tuskar Rock with the loss of all hands.
Hannah and John	United Kingdom	The ship was driven ashore at Penzance, Cornwall. She was on a voyage from Shoreham-by-Sea, Sussex to Cork.
HMS Pigeon	Royal Navy	The Cuckoo-class schooner was wrecked in the North Sea off Kingsgate, Kent with the loss of two of her twenty crew.
Unnamed	Sweden	The cutter was driven ashore near Whitby, Yorkshire, United Kingdom.

=== 6 January ===
List of shipwrecks: 6 January 1809
Ship	State	Description
Betty	Sweden	The ship was wrecked at Arklow, County Wicklow, United Kingdom. Her crew were rescued. She was on a voyage from Liverpool, Lancashire, United Kingdom to a Spanish port.
Horatio	United Kingdom	The ship was wrecked on the Maple Sand, in the North Sea off the coast of Essex. Her crew were rescued. She was on a voyage from London to Liverpool.
Satisfaction	United Kingdom	The ship was sighted in the Øresund. No further trace, presumed foundered with the loss of all hands.

=== 7 January ===
List of shipwrecks: 7 January 1809
Ship	State	Description
Diligence	United Kingdom	The transport ship was driven ashore at Ramsgate, Kent and severely damaged.
Goodenough	Denmark-Norway	The schooner was driven ashore and wrecked at Cove, Aberdeen, United Kingdom with the loss of two of her five crew.
Royal Recovery	United Kingdom	The brig was wrecked at Gunwalloe, Cornwall. Her crew were rescued. She was on a voyage from Liverpool, Lancashire to London.

=== 8 January ===
List of shipwrecks: 8 January 1809
Ship	State	Description
Catherine	United Kingdom	The brig was wrecked at Portland, Dorset. Her crew were rescued. She was on a voyage from Bristol, Gloucestershire to London.
Duke of Clarence	United Kingdom	The transport ship was driven ashore and severely damaged at Quiberon, Morbihan, France.
Duke of York	United Kingdom	The ship was driven from her moorings at Falmouth, Cornwall. she collided with a galiot and sank. Her crew were rescued.
Elizabeth	United Kingdom	The transport ship was wrecked at Quiberon.
Elizabeth	United Kingdom	The transport ship, (marked E.E.) was wrecked at Quiberon with the loss of three lives.
Elizabeth	United Kingdom	The transport ship (marked H.I.) was driven ashore at Quiberon. She was on a voyage from Lisbon, Portugal to Quiberon and Plymouth, Devon.
Good Intent	United Kingdom	The transport ship was driven ashore at Quiberon.
Jane	United Kingdom	The transport ship was driven ashore at Quiberon.
Minerva	United Kingdom	The ship was wrecked at Quiberon. She was on a voyage from Lisbon to Quiberon and Plymouth.
Renown	United Kingdom	The transport ship was driven ashore at Quiberon.
Rodney	United Kingdom	The transport ship was driven ashore at Quiberon. She was later refloated and sailed to Portsmouth, Hampshire.
William	United Kingdom	The ship was wrecked at Land's End, Cornwall with the loss of seven of her crew. She was on a voyage from Demerara to London.

=== 9 January ===
List of shipwrecks: 9 January 1809
Ship	State	Description
Cato	United Kingdom	The ship ran aground at Aberdeen. She was on a voyage from London to Aberdeen. She was refloated and taken in to Aberdeen.
HMS Morne Fortunee	Royal Navy	The schooner capsized in the Indian Ocean off Martinique in a squall. There were nineteen survivors.

=== 10 January ===
List of shipwrecks: 10 January 1809
Ship	State	Description
Carmarthen Packet	United Kingdom	The ship was wrecked on The Shingles, off the Isle of Wight. Her crew were rescued. She was on a voyage from Cork to Portsmouth, Hampshire.
Elizabeth	United Kingdom	The ship departed Havana, Cuba for Cádiz, Spain. No further trace, presumed foundered in the Atlantic Ocean with the loss of all hands.
Two Friends	United Kingdom	The ship was wrecked on the Haisborough Sands, Norfolk.

=== 11 January ===
List of shipwrecks: 11 January 1809
Ship	State	Description
Isabella and Margaret	United Kingdom	The sloop was wrecked at Lossiemouth, Morayshire. Her crew were rescued. She was on a voyage from Aberdeen to Inverness.
Jeschkenthall	Sweden	English Wars: The ship was driven ashore on Saltholm, Denmark, where she was burnt by the Danes.
HMS Magnet	Royal Navy	The Cruizer-class brig-sloop was driven ashore and wrecked west of Malmö, Sweden. Her 120 crew were rescued.

=== 13 January ===
List of shipwrecks: 13 January 1809
Ship	State	Description
Yeshenkhal	Russia	The ship was driven ashore near Malmö, Sweden. She was burnt by the Danish.

=== 14 January ===
List of shipwrecks: 14 January 1809
Ship	State	Description
Caroline	France	The brig, a letter of marque and prize of HMS Eclair (Royal Navy), was run down and sunk in the Cattewater.

=== 15 January ===
List of shipwrecks: 15 January 1809
Ship	State	Description
Yeschkenthal	Russia	The ship was driven ashore by the Danes and then set afire and destroyed.

=== 16 January ===
List of shipwrecks: 16 January 1809
Ship	State	Description
Peter	United Kingdom	The ship was wrecked near Wexford with the loss of all hands. She was on a voyage from Dublin to Bristol, Gloucestershire.

=== 17 January ===
List of shipwrecks: 17 January 1809
Ship	State	Description
Appledore	United Kingdom	The sloop was driven ashore in Tramore Bay.
Francis	United Kingdom	The ship was driven ashore near Dublin and was abandoned by her crew. She was on a voyage from Liverpool, Lancashire to Curaçao.
Linskell	United Kingdom	Peninsular War: The transport ship was driven ashore at A Coruña, Spain. She was refloated.
Middlesex	United Kingdom	Peninsular War: The transport ship was destroyed at A Coruña to prevent her being captured.
Naiad	United Kingdom	Peninsular War: The transport ship was destroyed at A Coruña to prevent her being captured.
Nymph	United Kingdom	Peninsular War: The transport ship was destroyed at A Coruña to prevent her being captured.
Recommencement	United Kingdom	The ship ran aground in the Malmö Channel. She was set afire and destroyed by the Danes.
Sally	United Kingdom	The ship foundered off Barbados. Her crew were rescued. She was on a voyage from "Shelburn" to Barbados.
Thomas's	United Kingdom	Peninsular War: The transport ship was burnt at A Coruña to prevent her being captured.
Townsend	United Kingdom	The ship was driven ashore at Falmouth, Cornwall, but it expected that she would be gotten off.
Trusty	United Kingdom	The ship was wrecked on the Brazen Head Rocks, off Waterford with the loss of sixteen of her 23 crew.
Venture	United Kingdom	The ship was run down and sunk in the English Channel off Torbay, Devon by Robert and Ann (United Kingdom). All on board were rescued.

=== 18 Jauary ===
List of shipwrecks: 18 January 1809
Ship	State	Description
Trial	United States	The ship was wrecked on Long Island, New York with the loss of all but three of her crew.

=== 19 January ===
List of shipwrecks: 19 January 1809
Ship	State	Description
George	United Kingdom	The ship was sunk by ice at Hull, Yorkshire. She was refloated the next day. George was on a voyage from Malta to Hull.

=== 20 January ===
List of shipwrecks: 20 January 1809
Ship	State	Description
HMS Claudia	Royal Navy	The Adonis-class schooner was wrecked off Kristiansand, Norway with the loss of fourteen of her 35 crew.

=== 21 January ===
List of shipwrecks: 20 January 1809
Ship	State	Description
Sylvanus	United Kingdom	The transport ship was wrecked near Rosscarbery, County Cork. Her crew were rescued.

=== 22 January ===
List of shipwrecks: 22 January 1809
Ship	State	Description
Ann Philippaa	United Kingdom	The ship was wrecked on the Isle of Pines, Cuba. She was on a voyage from Jamaica to Glasgow, Renfrewshire.
Dispatch	United Kingdom	The transport ship was driven ashore and wrecked at Falmouth, Cornwall with the loss of about 100 lives. There were seven survivors. Dispatch later refloated and drove ashore in Coverach Bay.
Dove	United Kingdom	The ship was lost near "Looe Island". She was on a voyage from Plymouth, Devon to Falmouth.
Generous Mind	United Kingdom	The ship was wrecked on The Staples with the loss of all hands. She was on a voyage from Aberdeen to Hull, Yorkshire.
Orion	United Kingdom	The transport ship was driven ashore in the Isles of Scilly. She was later refloated and put into St. Mary's.
HMS Primrose	Royal Navy	The Cruizer-class brig-sloop was wrecked on The Manacles with the loss of 120 of her 121 crew.

=== 23 January ===
List of shipwrecks: 23 January 1809
Ship	State	Description
Malta	United Kingdom	The ship was driven ashore and wrecked at Newhaven, Sussex.
Orion	United Kingdom	The transport ship was driven ashore in the Isles of Scilly.
Rose	United Kingdom	The packet ship was wrecked at Looe, Cornwall with the loss of more than 33 lives. She was on a voyage from Plymouth, Devon to Falmouth, Cornwall.

=== 24 January ===
List of shipwrecks: 24 January 1809
Ship	State	Description
Apollo	United Kingdom	The ship was wrecked on the Goodwin Sands with the loss of fourteen of her crew.
Argo	United Kingdom	The transport ship, a brig, was driven ashore at Llanelly, Glamorgan.
Henry	United Kingdom	The transport ship was driven ashore and wrecked at Glandore, County Cork. Her crew were rescued.
Jane	United Kingdom	The ship was driven ashore at Milford Haven, Pembrokeshire.
Old Wife	United Kingdom	The ship was wrecked in Mount's Bay.
Sylvanus	United Kingdom	The transport ship was wrecked at Rosscarbery, County Cork. Her crew were rescued.
Twilight	United Kingdom	The ship was driven ashore and wrecked at Southwold, Suffolk.
Tamanto	Kingdom of Sicily	The ship departed from the Isles of Scilly for London. No further trace, presumed foundered with the loss of all hands.

=== 25 January ===
List of shipwrecks: 25 January 1809
Ship	State	Description
Admiral Gardner	British East India Company	The wrecks of Britannia and Admiral Gardner. The East Indiaman was wrecked on the Goodwin Sands, Kent. She was on a voyage from London to Madeira and Madras, India. Carnatic ( British East India Company) rescued four survivors./ Also described as Lord Gardner.
Apollo	United Kingdom	The ship was wrecked on the Goodwin Sands with the loss of nineteen of her twenty crew. She was on a voyage from London to Curaçao.
Britannia	British East India Company	The wrecks of Britannia and Admiral Gardner. The East Indiaman was wrecked on the Goodwin Sands.
Castor	United Kingdom	The ship foundered whilst on a voyage from Plymouth, Devon to Sunderland, County Durham. Her crew were rescued.
Ceres	United Kingdom	The ship foundered in the Irish Sea off Milford Haven, Pembrokeshire. Her crew were rescued. She was on a voyage from Llanelly, Glamorgan to Plymouth.
Maisters	United Kingdom	The transport ship ran aground on the Hospital Shoal, off Spithead, Hampshire. She was later refloated and taken in to Portsmouth, Hampshire.
Manchester	United Kingdom	The brig ran aground on the Dudgeon Sandbank, in the North Sea. She was refloated but conequently foundered. Her crew were rescued by Harry (United Kingdom). Manchester was on a voyage from Selby, Yorkshire to London.
Young Fanny	Prussia	The ship was driven ashore at Plymouth and wrecked with some loss of life.

=== 26 January ===
List of shipwrecks: 26 January 1809
Ship	State	Description
Maria	United Kingdom	The ship was driven ashore at Grange Chine, Isle of Wight.
Samuel Walker	United Kingdom	The ship was driven ashore near Bridlington, Yorkshire.

=== 27 January ===
List of shipwrecks: 27 January 1809
Ship	State	Description
Caledonia	United Kingdom	The ship was driven ashore and wrecked in Tramore Bay. She was on a voyage from Alicante, Spain to Belfast, County Antrim.
Elizabeth	United Kingdom	The ship was wrecked near Newry, County Antrim.
Three Brothers	United Kingdom	The ship was holed by an anchor and sank at Holyhead, Anglesey.

=== 28 January ===
List of shipwrecks: 28 January 1809
Ship	State	Description
Aimwell	British East India Company	The ship was driven ashore at Lowestoft, Suffolk.
Nancy	United Kingdom	The collier was wrecked at the Cape of Good Hope.
Squirrel	United Kingdom	The ship was driven ashore and wrecked at the mouth of the River Don. She was on a voyage from Great Yarmouth, Norfolk to Aberdeen.

=== 29 January ===
List of shipwrecks: 29 January 1809
Ship	State	Description
Adventure	United Kingdom	The ship was driven ashore at Penzance, Cornwall. She was on a voyage from Málaga, Spain to Gibraltar and Portsmouth, Hampshire.
Betsey	United Kingdom	The ship sprang a leak and was abandoned in the Atlantic Ocean (56°30′N 9°10′W). Her crew were rescued by Watson (United Kingdom). Betsey was on a voyage from Jamaica to the Clyde.
Elizabeth	United Kingdom	The ship was driven ashore in the Cattewater.
Foxwell	United Kingdom	The ship was wrecked at Wexford. Her crew were rescued. She was on a voyage from Dominica to London.
Hope	United Kingdom	The ship was wrecked on the Black Middens, in the North Sea off South Shields, County Durham.
Louisa	United Kingdom	The transport ship was driven ashore and wrecked in the Cattewater.
Margaret	United Kingdom	The ship was driven onto the Herd Sand, in the North Sea off South Shields.
Margery and Mary	United Kingdom	Napoleonic Wars: The ship was captured and burnt by Papillon (French Navy). She was on a voyage from London to New Providence, New Jersey, United States.
Mary	United Kingdom	The ship was wrecked on the Black Middens, in the North Sea off South Shields, County Durham.
Prince of Wales	United Kingdom	The ship was driven ashore at South Shields.

=== 30 January ===
List of shipwrecks: 30 January 1809
Ship	State	Description
America	(United Kingdom of Great Britain and Ireland) British North America	The ship was driven ashore at Falmouth, Cornwall. She was later refloated.
Britannia	United Kingdom	The sloop was driven ashore and wrecked in the River Tay. Her crew were rescued.
Carteret	United Kingdom	The packet ship was driven ashore at Falmouth.
Chesterfield	United Kingdom	The packet ship was driven ashore at Falmouth. She was later refloated.
HMS Dannemark	Royal Navy	The third rate ship of the line was driven ashore at Portsmouth, Hampshire.
Dantzic	United Kingdom	The ship was severely damaged at Portsmouth. She was on a voyage from London to Malta.
Duke of Kent	United Kingdom	The packet ship was driven ashore at Falmouth. She was later refloated.
Eclipse	United Kingdom	The transport ship was driven ashore in Stokes Bay.
Enterprize	United Kingdom	The transport ship was driven ashore in Stokes Bay.
Hibernia	United Kingdom	The transport ship was driven ashore in Stokes Bay.
Hit or Miss	United Kingdom	The transport ship was driven ashore at Southsea, Hampshire. She was later refloated.
flagFlag unknown	{{{flag}}}	The ship was driven ashore in Stokes Bay.
Howe	United Kingdom	The ship was driven ashore and damaged at Portsmouth. She was later refloated.
John	United Kingdom	Captain Charleton's transport ship was driven ashore at Southsea. She was later refloated.
John	United Kingdom	Captain Wood's transport ship was driven ashore at Southsea. She was later refloated.
Leanie	United Kingdom	The ship was driven ashore and wrecked in Stokes Bay. She was on a voyage from Seville, Spain to London.
Melantho	United Kingdom	The transport ship was driven ashore in Stokes Bay. She was later refloated.
Melburn	United Kingdom	The ship was driven ashore at Southsea.
Oak	United Kingdom	The transport ship was driven ashore at Southsea. She was later refloated and taken in to Portsmouth.
Perseverance	United Kingdom	The ship was driven ashore and wrecked in Stokes Bay. She was on a voyage from London to Porto, Portugal.
Phoenix	United Kingdom	The ship was wrecked on Nash Point, Glamorgan with the loss of one of her seven crew. She was on a voyage from Bideford, Devon to Newport, Monmouthshire.
Saturnus	Sweden	The ship was driven ashore and wrecked near Portsmouth. She was on a voyage from Gothenburg to Cádiz, Spain.
Triton	United Kingdom	The ship was driven ashore. She was refloated and beached on the Hoyle Bank, in Liverpool Bay, where she was wrecked. Triton was on a voyage from Rio de Janeiro to Liverpool, Lancashire.
Union	United Kingdom	The transport ship was driven ashore in Stokes Bay.
Union	United Kingdom	The ship was driven ashore near Portsmouth. She was on a voyage from Limerick to London. Union was later refloated.
Vovenguen	Spain	The ship was driven ashore at Falmouth.

=== 31 January ===
List of shipwrecks: 31 January 1809
Ship	State	Description
Carnation	French Navy	Invasion of Martinique: The Cruizer-class brig-sloop was set afire and scuttled at Martinique to prevent her capture by the Royal Navy.
Jane	United Kingdom	The ship was driven asore at Milford Haven, Pembrokeshire.
Mary, and Sarah	United Kingdom	The two ships collided off the Blasket Islands, County Kerry. Sarah sank. Mary was on a voyage from Limerick to Poole, Dorset. She put into Cove, County Cork in distress. Sarah was on a voyage from Limerick to Portsmouth, Hampshire.
Snap Dragon	United Kingdom	The ship was severely damaged at Ramsgate, Kent when another vessel drove from her moorings and collided with her. She was on a voyage from London to Trinidad.
Sprightly	United Kingdom	The ship was wrecked on the coast of the Isle of Man. Her crew were rescued. She was on a voyage from Newry, County Down to Liverpool, Lancashire.

=== Unknown date ===
List of shipwrecks: Unknown date in January 1809
Ship	State	Description
Alexander	United Kingdom	The ship was wrecked near Blakeney, Norfolk.
Anna Elizabeth	Flag unknown	The ship was driven ashore in the Baltic Sea.
Brothers	United Kingdom	The ship foundered in Riga Bay.
Brothers	United Kingdom	The transport ship was destroyed by fire at Cork.
Catherine	United Kingdom	The ship ran aground on the Knock Sand and was damaged. She was later refloated.
Charles William	United Kingdom	The ship ran aground on Anticosti Island, Saint Lawrence River. She was on a voyage from Quebec City, Lower Canada, British North America to London.
HMS Constant	Royal Navy	The Archer-class gun-brig was driven ashore on the coast of Sweden.
Diana	Russia	The ship was driven ashore at Swinemünde, Prussia.
Die Hoffnung	Flag unknown	The ship was wrecked on Ameland, Friesland, Kingdom of Holland.
Elizabeth	Sweden	The ship was driven ashore near Stockholm. She was on a voyage from Gothenburg to Sundsvall.
Fairfield	United Kingdom	The ship foundered in the North Sea off Peterhead, Aberdeenshire. She was on a voyage from Sundsvall, Sweden to London.
Fama	Flag unknown	The ship was driven ashore on Saaremaa, Russia.
Good Intent	United Kingdom	The transport ship was wrecked near Christchurch, Dorset. Her crew were rescued
Hibernia	United Kingdom	The brig was driven ashore and wrecked in Stokes Bay, Hampshire.
Hoffnung	Sweden	The ship was wrecked on Læsø, Denmark. Her crew were rescued but made prisoner.
Jacob	United Kingdom	The ship was wrecked on the Dutch coast with the loss of all but three of her crew.
Jannette	Flag unknown	The ship was lost at Memel, Prussia.
Johanna	Sweden	The ship was lost on the coast of Sweden.
Liebling	Prussia	The ship was lost at Memel.
Lisbon Packet	United Kingdom	The ship was driven ashore at Dundalk, County Louth. She was on a voyage from Lisbon, Portugal to Dublin.
Maida	United Kingdom	The transport ship was driven ashore in Bootle Bay. She was later refloated. Maida was on a voyage from A Coruña, Spain to Liverpool, Lancashire.
Malvina	United Kingdom	The transport ship was wrecked at A Coruña. Her crew were rescued.
Mansfield	United Kingdom	The ship departed from Seville, Spain for London. No further trace, presumed foundered with the loss of all hands.
Margaret	United Kingdom	The ship was driven ashore in the Isles of Scilly. She was later refloated and put into Falmouth, Cornwall, where she arrived on 25 January. Margaret was on a voyage from London to Porto, Portugal.
Maria	United States	The brig was wrecked on the coast of Cuba. She was on a voyage from Cuba to New York.
Mary	United Kingdom	The ship was wrecked at Poole, Dorset. She was on a voyage from London to Portsmouth, Hampshire.
Minerva	United Kingdom	The ship foundered in Riga Bay.
Morgenstern	Flag unknown	The ship was lost in the Gulf of Finland.
Myrmidon	United Kingdom	The ship was wrecked near Blakeney.
Nadcashda, or Nadicastrda	Russia	The ship was captured by the Danes and scuttled off Malmö, Sweden.
Naid	United Kingdom	The transport ship was driven ashore and wrecked at A Coruña, Spain. Her crew were rescued.
Ocean	United Kingdom	The transport ship was driven ashore at A Coruña and was abandoned by her crew.
HMS Piercer	Royal Navy	The Archer-class gun-brig was driven ashore on the coast of Sweden.
Pomona	United Kingdom	The ship was driven ashore in Carnarvon Bay. She was on a voyage from Lisbon, Portugal to Liverpool.
Providence	United Kingdom	The ship was driven ashore on the Irish coast. Her crew were rescued. She was on a voyage from Liverpool to Port Rush, County Antrim.
Purchase	United Kingdom	The transport ship was driven ashore at A Coruña.
Rachel	United Kingdom	The ship was driven ashore at Dungarvan, County Waterford. She was on a voyage from Bristol, Gloucestershire to Liverpool.
Razor Grinder	United Kingdom	The sloop was driven ashore and wrecked at Eastney, Hampshire. She was on a voyage from London to Portsmouth.
Recommencement	United Kingdom	English War: The ship was driven ashore on "Shano" and was burnt by the Danes.
Ringmore	United Kingdom	The ship departed from Dartmouth, Devon in late January for London. No further trace, presumed foundered with the loss of all hands.
Romulus	United Kingdom	The ship was driven ashore on the Isle of Wight.
Rose	United Kingdom	The ship was driven ashore at Lowestoft, Suffolk between 25 and 28 January. She was later refloated and anchored off Great Yarmouth, Norfolk. Rose was on a voyage from London to Tobago.
Scorner	United Kingdom	The cutter was lost on the coast of Norway.
Shepherdess	United Kingdom	The ship was wrecked on Flat Holm, in the Bristol Channel.
Speculator	United Kingdom	The ship departed Cork for Brazil. No further trace, presumed foundered with the loss of all hands.
Speculation	United Kingdom	The ship was lost in the Baltic Sea.
Three Davids	United Kingdom	The ship ran aground near "Skanar", Sweden.
True Love	United Kingdom	The ship was abandoned before 3 January. She was on a voyage from Seville, Spain to London. True Love was taken in to Bantry, County Cork on 8 January.
Wandringsman	Sweden	The brig was driven ashore and wrecked near Happisburgh, Norfolk.
Wilhelmina	Flag unknown	The ship was lost in Riga Bay.
William	United Kingdom	The transport ship was wrecked at A Coruña, Spain.
Woodman	United Kingdom	The ship was wrecked on the coast of Suffolk. She was on a voyage from Newhaven, Sussex to Newcastle-upon-Tyne, Northumberland.
Unnamed	Denmark	The privateer, a schooner, prize to HMS Egeria (Royal Navy), was driven ashore at Grimsby, Lincolnshire, United Kingdom.

== February ==
=== 1 February ===
List of shipwrecks: 1 February 1809
Ship	State	Description
Berkshire	United Kingdom	The collier was wrecked on Scroby Sands, Norfolk.
John	United Kingdom	The ship was driven ashore in the River Mersey.
Sultan	United Kingdom	The collier was wrecked on Scroby Sands.

=== 2 February ===
List of shipwrecks: 2 February 1809
Ship	State	Description
Ranger	United Kingdom	The ship ran aground on a reef off San Salvador Island, Bahamas. She was on a voyage from London to New Providence, New Jersey, United States.
Three Brothers	United Kingdom	The ship was holed by an anchor at Holyhead, Anglesey and became waterlogged. She was on a voyage from Saint Croix to Liverpool, Lancashire.

=== 3 February ===
List of shipwrecks: 3 February 1809
Ship	State	Description
Alexander	United Kingdom	The ship ran aground on the Brake Sand. She was on a voyage from London to Tobago. She was refloated with assistance and taken in to Margate, Kent. She subsequently sailed for the River Thames for repairs.
Amphitrite	French Navy	Invasion of Martinique: The Armide-class frigate was scuttled at Martinique to prevent her capture by the Royal Navy.
Ann	United Kingdom	The ship was driven ashore at Berwick-upon-Tweed, Northumberland. Her crew were rescued.
Henry Addington	United Kingdom	The East Indiaman ran aground at Bognor, Sussex. She was refloated and put back to The Downs.
Merchant	United Kingdom	The ship was wrecked at Berwick-upon-Tweed. Her crew were rescued. She was on a voyage from Dundee, Forfarshire to Newcastle-upon-Tyne, Northumberland.
Robert	United Kingdom	The ship was driven ashore at Greenock, Renfrewshire. She was on a voyage from Greenock to Jamaica. Robert was refloated and sailed on 14 February.
Three Sisters	United Kingdom	The brig was driven ashore and wrecked 5 nautical miles (9.3 km) west of Dunbar, Lothian. Her crew were rescued. She was on a voyage from Sunderland, County Durham to Aberdeen.

=== 5 February ===
List of shipwrecks: 5 February 1809
Ship	State	Description
Ulisses	Portugal	The ship foundered in Cape Verde. She was on a voyage from Rio de Janeiro, Brazil.

=== 6 February ===
List of shipwrecks: 6 February 1809
Ship	State	Description
Active	Demerara	The schooner was driven ashore at Sandy Hook, New Jersey, United States.
Baltic	United Kingdom	The ship foundered in the Bristol Channel off Lundy Island, Devon. She was on a voyage from Cardiff, Glamorgan to London.
Isabella	United Kingdom	The galiot was driven ashore at Montrose, Forfarshire. All on board were rescued. She was on a voyage from Sunderland, County Durham to Aberdeen. Isabella was later refloated.
Mars	United Kingdom	The cutter was wrecked on St. Nicholas Island, Devon. She was on a voyage from Falmouth, Cornwall to Plymouth, Devon.
Susannah	United Kingdom	The ship ran aground on the Pudding Pye Sand, in the River Humber at Brough, Yorkshire and capsized. She was on a voyage from King's Lynn, Norfolk to Stockwith (either West Stockwith, Nottinghamshire or East Stockwith, Lincolnshire).
Two unnamed vessels	United Kingdom	The ships were wrecked at St. Ives, Cornwall.

=== 7 February ===
List of shipwrecks: 7 February 1809
Ship	State	Description
Elizabeth	United Kingdom	The ship was wrecked on the New Sand, in the North Sea off the mouth of the Humber. Her crew survived. She was on a voyage from London to Aberdeen.
Fortitude	United Kingdom	The ship was driven ashore and wrecked at Marazion, Cornwall.
John	United Kingdom	The ship was wrecked on the coast of County Down. Her crew were rescued. She was on a voyage from St. Ubes, Spain to Gothenburg, Sweden.
Two Brothers	United Kingdom	The ship was driven ashore and wrecked near Dymchurch, Kent.

=== 8 February ===
List of shipwrecks: 8 February 1809
Ship	State	Description
Baltic	United Kingdom	The ship foundered in the Bristol Channel off Lundy Island, Devon. Her crew were rescued. She was on a voyage from Cardiff, Glamorgan to London.
Bell	United Kingdom	The ship was driven ashore and wrecked at Portsmouth, Hampshire. She was on a voyage from Newcastle-upon-Tyne, Northumberland to Lisbon, Portugal.
Duchess of York	United Kingdom	The ship foundered near Newry, County Antrim with the loss of all hands. She was on a voyage from Waterford to Liverpool, Lancashire.
Hellen	United Kingdom	The ship struck and anchor and sank at Holyhead, Anglesey. She was on a voyage from Alicante, Spain to Liverpool.
Jannet	United Kingdom	The ship ran aground on the Hoyle Bank, in Liverpool Bay and was wrecked. She was on a voyage from Limerick to Liverpool.
Joseph and Mary	United Kingdom	The ship foundered whilst on a voyage from Liverpool to Portsmouth, Hampshire. Her crew were rescued.
Mayflower	United Kingdom	The ship was driven ashore in Dundalk Bay. She was on a voyage from Waterford to Liverpool.
Mistley	United Kingdom	The transport ship foundered in the Bay of Biscay with the loss of three of her crew.
Neptune	United Kingdom	The ship was driven ashore at Arklow, County Wicklow. She was on a voyage from Glasgow, Renfrewshire to Antigua.
Rebecca	United Kingdom	The ship was wrecked on the South Bull, in the Irish Sea off County Dublin. Her crew were rescued.
Warren	United Kingdom	The ship was driven ashore at Dungarvan, County Waterford.

=== 9 February ===
List of shipwrecks: 9 February 1809
Ship	State	Description
Active	United Kingdom	The ship was driven ashore at Milford, Pembrokeshire. She was on a voyage from Jamaica to London. She was refloated the next day.
Endeavour	United Kingdom	The ship was lost at Drogheda, County Louth. She was on a voyage from Waterford to Liverpool, Lancashire.
Mary and Alice	United Kingdom	The ship was driven ashore and wrecked at Milford. She was on a voyage from Waterford to Bristol, Gloucestershire.
Swift	United Kingdom	The ship was driven ashore in the River Tay. She was later refloated and taken in to Dundee, Forfarshire, where she was placed under repair.
Thames	United Kingdom	The sloop was wrecked on the Nore, in the Thames Estuary off Sheerness, Kent with the loss of four lives. Survivors were rescued by Fortitude (United Kingdom). Thames was on a voyage from Dundee, Forfarshire to London.

=== 10 February ===
List of shipwrecks: 10 February 1809
Ship	State	Description
Bell	United Kingdom	The ship was wrecked in the English Channel off Spithead, Hampshire.
Dispatch	United Kingdom	The ship was wrecked at Waterford with the loss of all hands. She was on a voyage from Whitehaven, Cumberland to Waterford.
Elizabeth	United Kingdom	The ship was lost near Wexford. Her crew were rescued. She was on a voyage from Cardigan to Liverpool, Lancashire.
Penelope	United Kingdom	The ship struck the pier at Liverpool and sank. She was on a voyage from London to Liverpool.

=== 12 February ===
List of shipwrecks: 12 February 1809
Ship	State	Description
Mars	United Kingdom	The ship was driven ashore at Helston, Cornwall and was severely damaged. She was later refloated.
Nocton	United Kingdom	The packet ship was driven ashore at Falmouth, Cornwall.

=== 13 February ===
List of shipwrecks: 13 February 1809
Ship	State	Description
Augusta	United Kingdom	The ship was driven ashore and wrecked about 4 leagues 12 nautical miles (22 km) from Figueira da Foz, Portugal with the loss of six of her crew. She was on a voyage from Greenock, Renfrewshire to Jamaica.
Macclesfield	United Kingdom	The ship sprang a leak in the Atlantic Ocean (53°08′N 11°18′W) and was abandoned by her crew. They were rescued by Friendship (United Kingdom). Macclesfield was on a voyage from London to Surinam. She later came ashore on Rosine Island, in Galway Bay and was subsequently wrecked.
Mercury	United Kingdom	The ship was wrecked at Sunderland, County Durham.
Penelope	United Kingdom	The ship struck the quayside and sank at Liverpool, Lancashire.
Resolution	United Kingdom Guernsey	The ship foundered off St. Andero, Spain. Her crew survived.
St Carlos	Flag unknown	The ship foundered in the Atlantic Ocean. Her crew were rescued by Phœnix (United Kingdom).

=== 17 February ===
List of shipwrecks: 17 February 1809
Ship	State	Description
Mertelner	United Kingdom	The ship was lost whilst on a voyage from Hull, Yorkshire to Gainsborough, Lincolnshire.

=== 18 February ===
List of shipwrecks: 18 February 1809
Ship	State	Description
Arethusa	United Kingdom	The sloop was driven ashore at Aberdeen.
Betsey	United Kingdom	The ship was driven ashore and wrecked on The Cumbraes, County of Bute. She was on a voyage from Belfast, County Antrim to Glasgow, Renfrewshire
Eliza Sprott	United States	The ship was driven ashore and wrecked. She was on a voyage from Aberdeen to Liverpool, Lancashire, United Kingdom.
Lady Hill	United Kingdom	The ship was driven ashore in Movill Bay, Ireland. She was later refloated and taken in to Londonderry.
Resolution	United Kingdom	The ship was abandoned by her crew off Cape Ortegal Spain and subsequently sank.

=== 20 February ===
List of shipwrecks: 20 February 1809
Ship	State	Description
Harriet	United Kingdom	The ship was wrecked near Sandy Hook, New Jersey, United States.
True American	United States	The ship was lost near New York. She was on a voyage from Jamaica to New York.

=== 21 February ===
List of shipwrecks: 21 February 1809
Ship	State	Description
Dorothea	United Kingdom	The ship was driven ashore on Heligoland.
Susan	United Kingdom	The cutter was driven ashore at Rock Ferry, Cheshire. She was on a voyage from Liverpool, Lancashire to New Providence, New Jersey, United States. Susan was later refloated.

=== 24 February ===
List of shipwrecks: 24 February 1809
Ship	State	Description
Calypso	French Navy	Battle of Les Sables-d'Olonne: The Gloire-class frigate was driven ashore at Les Sables d'Olonne, Vendée.
Cybèle	French Navy	Battle of Les Sables-d'Olonne: The Nymphe-class frigate ran aground and was damaged beyond repair in an action against HMS Amelia, HMS Caesar, HMS Defiance, HMS Donegal and HMS Dotterel (all Royal Navy). She was consequently broken up.
Italienne	French Navy	Battle of Les Sables-d'Olonne: The Consolante-class frigate was driven ashore at Les Sables d'Olonne.

=== 26 February ===
List of shipwrecks: 26 February 1809
Ship	State	Description
Jean Bart	French Navy	The Téméraire-class ship of the line ran aground on the Lespalles Shoal, off Île Madame, Charente-Inférieure and was wrecked. The wreck was subsequently burnt by the Royal Navy following the Battle of the Basque Roads.

=== 27 February ===
List of shipwrecks: 27 February 1809
Ship	State	Description
Good Statesman	United Kingdom	The ship struck an anchor and sank at Plymouth, Devon.
Warsaw	French Navy	The 74-gun ship of the line was driven ashore and wrecked at Les Sables-d'Olonne, Vendée in an action with HMS Amelia, HMS Caesar, HMS Defiance and HMS Donegal (all Royal Navy).

=== Unknown date ===
List of shipwrecks: Unknown date in February 1809
Ship	State	Description
Active	United Kingdom	The ship was driven ashore. She was refloated and put into Milford, Pembrokeshire on 10 February. Active was on a voyage from Youghall, County Cork to London.
Æolus	United Kingdom	The brig was driven ashore at Spurn Point, Yorkshire.
Anna	United Kingdom	The ship capsized at Falmouth, Cornwall. She was on a voyage from London to Haiti.
Brown	United Kingdom	War of the Fourth Coalition The ship was captured by the French. She was run ashore near Altafulla, Spain and burnt. She was on a voyage from London to Tarragona, Spain.
Catharine	United Kingdom	The ship was lost in the Baltic Sea.
Countess of Darlington	United Kingdom	The ship was wrecked at Flamborough Head, Yorkshire with the loss of all hands.
Drie Davids	Sweden	The ship was lost in Malmö Bay.
Eden	United Kingdom	The ship was driven ashore in the River Thames. She was on a voyage from Saint Kitts to London.
Everton	United Kingdom	The ship was wrecked on the Spanish coast whilst on a voyage from Liverpool, Lancashire to Spain. Her crew were rescued.
George	United Kingdom	The ship was driven ashore on Heligoland and abandoned by her crew. She was later refloated and taken in to Heligoland by HMS Musquito (Royal Navy). George was on a voyage from London to Heligoland.
Herald	United Kingdom	The ship foundered in the Atlantic Ocean of Cape Finisterre, Spain. Her crew were rescued.
John	United Kingdom	The ship was wrecked near Redruth, Cornwall. She was on a voyage from Cork to London.
Kitty's Amelia	United Kingdom	The ship was lost near Maldonado, Viceroyalty of the Río de la Plata.
Liddell	United Kingdom	The ship was wrecked on the Isle of Arran. She was on a voyage from Miramichi, New Brunswick, British North America to Liverpool.
Lucy	United Kingdom	Napoleonic Wars: The ship was captured by the French off Altafulla, Spain and was run ashore near Tarragona, Spain. She was burnt by a Royal Navy frigate. Lucy was on a voyage from Gibraltar to Tarragona.
Maria	French Navy	Invasion of Martinique: The gun-brig was burned at Martinique to prevent her capture by the British.
Mary	United Kingdom	The ship was discovered crewless at sea. She was taken in to "Pile".
Portland	United Kingdom	The ship was wrecked on Bardsey Island, Caernarfonshire. She was on a voyage from Liverpool to Pwllheli, Caernarfonshire.
Rattler	United Kingdom	The ship was driven ashore in St Austell Bay. She was on a voyage from London to Porto, Portugal.
Saturnus	Sweden	The brig was driven ashore and wrecked at Hayling Island, Hampshire, United Kingdom.
Severn	United Kingdom	The ship foundered in Dundalk Bay. She was on a voyage from Cork to Liverpool.
Susan	United Kingdom	The ship was lost near Hull, Yorkshire.
Swallow	United Kingdom	The ship was driven ashore at Youghal, County Cork. She was on a voyage from Newfoundland to Ross.
Throstle	United Kingdom	The ship was driven ashore on the Nore. She was on a voyage from Dundee, Forfarshire to London.
Two Friends	United Kingdom	The ship was wrecked at São Miguel, Azores, Portugal.
Union	United Kingdom	The ship foundered in St Brides Bay. She was on a voyage from Liverpool to London.
HMS Viper	United Kingdom	The schooner sailed from Cádiz on 9 February, bound for Gibraltar and never arrived; presumed foundered.

== March ==
=== 6 March ===
List of shipwrecks: 6 March 1809
Ship	State	Description
Goodintent	(United Kingdom of Great Britain and Ireland) Jersey	The ship ran aground on rocks off the Isles of Scilly. she was later refloated and beached. Goodintent was on a voyage from Jersey to Lisbon, Portugal.

=== 9 March ===
List of shipwrecks: 9 March 1809
Ship	State	Description
John	United States	The ship was wrecked in the Bahamas. She was on a voyage from Havana, Cuba to Baltimore, Maryland.

=== 11 March ===
List of shipwrecks: 11 March 1809
Ship	State	Description
Friends	United Kingdom	The ship was driven ashore at Kingsgate, Kent and sank. She was on a voyage from "Holloway" to Sandwich, Kent.
Prudence	United Kingdom	The ship was wrecked on the Haisborough Sands, in the North Sea off the coast of Norfolk. There was only one survivor.

=== 14 March ===
List of shipwrecks: 14 March 1809
Ship	State	Description
HMS Harrier	Royal Navy	The Cruizer-class brig-sloop was reported at a position 1,000 nautical miles (1,900 km) off Rodrigues, Mascarene Islands. No further trace, presumed to have foundered with the loss of all hands.
Spring	United Kingdom	The ship was driven ashore and wrecked near Blakeney, Norfolk. She was on a voyage from Heligoland to London.

=== 15 March ===
List of shipwrecks: 15 March 1809
Ship	State	Description
Bengal	British East India Company	The East Indiaman was last sighted off Mauritius on this date; presumed foundered with the loss of all hands.
Calcutta	British East India Company	The East Indiaman was last sighted off Mauritius on this date; presumed foundered with the loss of all hands.
Jane, Duchess of Gordon	British East India Company	The East Indiaman was last sighted off Mauritius on this date; presumed foundered with the loss of all hands.
Lady Jane Dundas	British East India Company	The East Indiaman was last sighted off Mauritius on this date; presumed foundered with the loss of all hands.

=== 17 March ===
List of shipwrecks: 17 March 1809
Ship	State	Description
Argument	(United Kingdom of Great Britain and Ireland) New South Wales	The sloop was wrecked off Broken Bay with the loss of all three people on board.

=== 19 March ===
List of shipwrecks: 19 March 1809
Ship	State	Description
John	United Kingdom	The ship was lost in the Bahamas. She was on a voyage from Havana, Cuba to Baltimore, Maryland, United States.

=== 21 March ===
List of shipwrecks: 21 March 1809
Ship	State	Description
Neptune	United Kingdom	The ship was wrecked in Ballyteague Bay. Her crew were rescued. She was on a voyage from Lisbon, Portugal to Liverpool, Lancashire.

=== 22 March ===
List of shipwrecks: 22 March 1809
Ship	State	Description
Caledonia	United Kingdom	The ship was driven ashore at Demerara.

=== 24 March ===
List of shipwrecks: 24 March 1809
Ship	State	Description
Leuser	Sweden	The ship was driven ashore at Landskrona. She was later refloated.

=== 25 March ===
List of shipwrecks: 25 March 1809
Ship	State	Description
Unnamed	United Kingdom	The sloop was driven ashore and wrecked at Montrose, Forfarshire. Her crew were rescued.

=== 27 March ===
List of shipwrecks: 27 March 1809
Ship	State	Description
Alliance	Sweden	The ship was wrecked on the coast of Jutland at Vigsø in the night of 26–27 March, with the loss of all hands.
Margaret	United Kingdom	The whaler was wrecked in the Orkney Islands. Her crew were rescued She was on a voyage from London to the Davis Straits.

=== 28 March ===
List of shipwrecks: 28 March 1809
Ship	State	Description
Nancy	United Kingdom	The ship was lost off Sapelo Island, Georgia, United States. She was on a voyage from Liverpool to Charleston, South Carolina, United States and St Mary's.

=== 29 March ===
List of shipwrecks: 29 March 1809
Ship	State	Description
Harmony	United Kingdom	Peninsular War: The ship was captured by the French at Lisbon, Portugal and was subsequently lost.
Queen	United Kingdom	Peninsular War: The ship was captured by the French at Lisbon and was subsequently lost.

=== 30 March ===
List of shipwrecks: 30 March 1809
Ship	State	Description
Brooks	United Kingdom	The ship was lost near Maranhão, Brazil. She was on a voyage from Liverpool, Lancashire to Brazil.
Chance	United Kingdom	The ship was lost near Wexford with the loss of all hands. She was on a voyage from Dublin to Wexford.

=== Unknown date ===
List of shipwrecks: Unknown date in March 1809
Ship	State	Description
Addington	United Kingdom	The transport ship was sunk by ice at Gothenburg, Sweden.
Alert	United Kingdom	The ship was run down and sunk in the Atlantic Ocean off the coast of Portugal by Prince George (United Kingdom). Her crew were rescued. She was on a voyage from Malta to London.
HMS Alert	United Kingdom	The ship-sloop ran aground off Drake's Island, Devon. She was refloated on 19 March.
Eclipse	United Kingdom	The ship was driven ashore on the French coast.
Fairfield	United Kingdom	The ship was wrecked at Rattray Head, Aberdeenshire. She was on a voyage from Sundsvall, Norway to London.
Felton	United Kingdom	Napoleonic Wars: The ship was captured by the French and burnt. She was on a voyage from Tenerife, Canary Islands to Bristol, Gloucestershire.
Harrington	United Kingdom	The brig was wrecked at Luzon, Spanish East Indies.
Hazard	(United Kingdom of Great Britain and Ireland) New South Wales	The sloop was wrecked at Box Head with the loss of one of her two crew. She was on a voyage from Pittwater to Sydney.
Nautilus	United Kingdom	The ship was lost at São Miguel Island, Azores.
Thetis	United Kingdom	The ship was driven ashore on the French coast.
Vrow Elizabeth	Flag unknown	The ship was lost in the Baltic Sea.
Vrow Jantjie	Flag unknown	The ship was driven ashore in the Cattegat. Her crew were rescued.
William	United Kingdom	The sloop was wrecked near Ayr.
Zephyr	Sweden	The ship was driven ashore in the Baltic Sea.

== April ==
=== 1 April ===
List of shipwrecks: 1 April 1809
Ship	State	Description
Lord Melville	United Kingdom	The ship was destroyed by fire and an explosion in the Atlantic Ocean (55°07′N 26°36′W) with the loss of a crew member. There were 26 survivors. She was on a voyage from Saint Vincent to Glasgow.

=== 7 April ===
List of shipwrecks: 7 April 1809
Ship	State	Description
Nancy	United Kingdom	The ship was severely damaged by fire at New York, United States.

=== 8 April ===
List of shipwrecks: 8 April 1809
Ship	State	Description
El Brilliante	Spain	The ship was wrecked on the Cat Keys. She was on a voyage from Havana, Cuba to Cádiz.

=== 12 April ===
List of shipwrecks: 12 April 1809
Ship	State	Description
Aquilon	French Navy	War of the Fifth Coalition, Battle of the Basque Roads: The Téméraire-class ship of the line was captured by HMS Revenge (Royal Navy) and was set afire.
Calcutta	French Navy	Régulus (left) and Calcutta (right). War of the Fifth Coalition, Battle of the Basque Roads: The fourth-rate ran aground. She was abandoned and set afire by her crew.
Esther	United Kingdom	The ship was destroyed by an explosion off Tory Island, County Donegal with the loss of four lives. She was on a voyage from Liverpool, Lancashire to Quebec City, Lower Canada, British North America.
Indienne	French Navy	War of the Fifth Coalition, Battle of the Basque Roads: The 46-gun ship was set afire and scuttled by her crew.
Jemappes	French Navy	War of the Fifth Coalition: Battle of the Basque Roads: The Téméraire-class ship of the line was driven ashore. She was later refloated and taken in to the Charente in a severely damaged condition.
HMS Mediator	Royal Navy	War of the Fifth Coalition, Battle of the Basque Roads: The fifth rate was expended as a fireship during the battle.
Régulus	French Navy	Régulus (left) and Calcutta (right). War of the Fifth Coalition, Battle of the Basque Roads: The Téméraire-class ship of the line ran aground off Fouras, Charente-Inférieure. She was refloated on 29 April.
Tonnerre	French Navy	War of the Fifth Coalition, Battle of the Basque Roads: The Téméraire-class ship of the line was beached. She was set afire and scuttled by her crew.

=== 13 April ===
List of shipwrecks: 13 April 1809
Ship	State	Description
Amelia	United Kingdom	The ship was driven ashore on Düne, Heligoland. She was later refloated. Amelia was on a voyage from Greenock, Renfrewshire to Heligoland.
Anna	United Kingdom	The brig was driven ashore and wrecked near the Birling Gap, Sussex. Her crew survived, She was on a voyage from Waterford to London.
Ezamheid	Heligoland	The ship was driven ashore on Düne.
Susannah	United Kingdom	The sloop was driven ashore and wrecked near the Birling Gap. Her crew survived. She was on a voyage from Waterford to London.
Ville de Varsovie	French Navy	War of the Fifth Coalition, Battle of the Basque Roads: The Bucentaure-class ship of the line ran aground during the battle. She was captured by HMS Revenge and was set afire and destroyed.

=== 14 April ===
List of shipwrecks: 14 April 1809
Ship	State	Description
Kitty	United Kingdom	The ship foundered in the North Sea off Fraserburgh, Aberdeenshire. She was on a voyage from Peterhead, Aberdeenshire to Leith, Lothian.

=== 15 April ===
List of shipwrecks: 15 April 1809
Ship	State	Description
Lady Charlotte	United Kingdom	The ship was driven ashore in Whitelink Bay. Her crew were rescued.

=== 16 April ===
List of shipwrecks: 16 April 1809
Ship	State	Description
Kitty	United Kingdom	The sloop was wrecked at Peterhead, Aberdeenshire with the loss of all five of her crew and the pilot.
Nelly	United Kingdom	The ship was wrecked at Dún Laoghaire, County Dublin with the loss of seven of her eight crew.
Penelope	United Kingdom	The ship was driven ashore near Cape Town, Cape Colony. She was still ashore on 27 April. Penelope was on a voyage from the Cape of Good Hope to Saint Helena and Surinam.
Sparkes and Rebecca	United Kingdom	The ship foundered in Liverpool Bay with the loss of all on board. She was on a voyage from Liverpool, Lancashire to Philadelphia, Pennsylvania, United States.

=== 17 April ===
List of shipwrecks: 17 April 1809
Ship	State	Description
Betsey	United Kingdom	The sloop was driven ashore and wrecked at Inchkeith, Fife with the loss of two of her four crew. She was on a voyage from Sunderland, County Durham to Peterhead, Aberdeenshire.
Ceres	United Kingdom	War of the Fifth Coalition: The ship was captured and sunk in the English Channel off Beachy Head, Sussex by a French privateer.
John and Ann	United Kingdom	War of the Fifth Coalition: The ship was captured and sunk in the English Channel off Beachy Head by a French privateer.

=== 20 April ===
List of shipwrecks: 20 April 1809
Ship	State	Description
Lord Cranstoun	United Kingdom	The ship ran aground on the Spit Sand, in the Bristol Channel. She was on a voyage from Saint Croix to Liverpool, Lancashire. Lord Cranstoun was later refloated and taken in to the King Road.

=== 22 April ===
List of shipwrecks: 22 April 1809
Ship	State	Description
James and Margaret	United Kingdom	The ship was driven ashore and wrecked at Great Yarmouth, Norfolk. She was on a voyage from London to Gothenburg, Sweden.

=== 23 April ===
List of shipwrecks: 23 April 1809
Ship	State	Description
Catherine	United Kingdom	The ship was wrecked on Whale Fish Island. Her crew were rescued. She was on a voyage from Hull, Yorkshire to the Davis Straits.
Fair Trader	United States	The ship was wrecked at sea with the loss of five of her crew and was abandoned. She was on a voyage from Philadelphia, Pennsylvania to Madeira.

== =24 April ==
List of shipwrecks: 24 April 1809
Ship	State	Description
Cassard	French Navy	The Téméraire-class ship of the line ran aground in the Charente and was severely damaged. She was refloated.
Foudroyant	French Navy	The Tonnant-class ship of the line was driven ashore at Rochefort, Charente-Inférieure.
Océan	French Navy	The Océan-class ship of the line was driven ashore at Rochefort.

=== 28 April ===
List of shipwrecks: 28 April 1809
Ship	State	Description
Cabrenangue	(Portugal) Brazil	The schooner was driven ashore near Bray Head, County Wicklow, United Kingdom. Her crew were rescued. She was on a voyage from Maranhão to Liverpool, Lancashire, United Kingdom.
Dutchess of Gordon	United Kingdom	The smack was wrecked at Macduff, Aberdeenshire. Her crew were rescued.
Stag	United Kingdom	The smack was driven ashore near the mouth of the River Spey. She was refloated.
Two unnamed vessels	United Kingdom	A brig and a schooner was driven ashore near the mouth of the River Spey.

=== 29 April ===
List of shipwrecks: 29 April 1809
Ship	State	Description
HMS Alcmene	Royal Navy	The Alcmene-class frigate ran aground at the mouth of the Loire. She was abandoned and set afire by her crew, who were rescued by HMS Amelia (Royal Navy).
Anna Maria	United Kingdom	The ship ran aground and was wrecked whilst on a voyage from Cuba to Grand Cayman Island. Her crew were rescued.
George	United Kingdom	The ship foundered in the Atlantic Ocean. Her crew were rescued. She was on a voyage from Greenock, Renfrewshire to Pictou, Nova Scotia, British North America.

=== 30 April ===
List of shipwrecks: 30 April 1809
Ship	State	Description
Three Brothers	United Kingdom	The ship sprang a leak and was abandoned.

=== Unknown date ===
List of shipwrecks: Unknown date in April 1809
Ship	State	Description
Charming Betsey	United Kingdom	The ship was lost whilst on a voyage from Sunderland, County Durham, to Banff, Aberdeenshire.
Doris	United Kingdom	The transport ship was run down and sunk by HMS Bonne Citoyenne (Royal Navy). All on board were rescued. She was on a voyage from Portsmouth, Hampshire, to Lisbon, Portugal.
Dree Gususters	Flag unknown	The ship was wrecked on the Barber Sand, in the North Sea off the coast of Norfolk, United Kingdom. Her crew were rescued.
Fame	United Kingdom	The ship was driven ashore and wrecked at Happisburgh, Norfolk.
Jeune Adelle	France	War of the Fifth Coalition: The schooner was captured and burnt by a French squadron. She was on a voyage from Marie-Galante to Barbados.
John	United Kingdom	The ship was wrecked at Padstow, Cornwall. She was on a voyage from Gatcombe, Gloucestershire to London.
Jong Cornelia	(Netherlands) Kingdom of Holland	The ship was lost in the Vlie.
Maria	United Kingdom	The ship was wrecked at Cape Canso, Nova Scotia, British North America at the end of April. She was on a voyage from London to Quebec City, Lower Canada, British North America.
Oak	United Kingdom	The transport ship was driven ashore at Yarmouth, Isle of Wight. She was later refloated and taken in to Portsmouth, Hampshire.
Rose in June	United Kingdom	The ship was wrecked at Ramsgate, Kent.
Royal Merchant	United Kingdom	The ship was driven ashore and wrecked at Happisburgh.
Two Sisters	United Kingdom	The ship was lost in the Tagus. Her crew were rescued. She was on a voyage from Lisbon to an English port.

== May ==
=== 1 May ===
List of shipwrecks: 1 May 1809
Ship	State	Description
Caledon	United Kingdom	The ship was wrecked on the English Bank, in the River Plate.

=== 3 May ===
List of shipwrecks: 3 May 1809
Ship	State	Description
Good Hope	United Kingdom	The ship was lost near Anegada. She was on a voyage from London to the Spanish Main.

=== 4 May ===
List of shipwrecks: 4 May 1809
Ship	State	Description
Hugh	United Kingdom	The ship was wrecked at St. Mary's, Isles of Scilly. She was on a voyage from Tortola to Liverpool, Lancashire.

=== 11 May ===
List of shipwrecks: 11 May 1809
Ship	State	Description
Unnamed	Royal Danish Navy	The cutter was driven ashore at "Huilbo". She was destroyed by HMS Melpomene (Royal Navy).

=== 14 May ===
List of shipwrecks: 14 May 1809
Ship	State	Description
Aldbro	United Kingdom	The ship was severely damaged by fire at Billingsgate, London.
Britannia	United Kingdom	The hoy was severely damaged by fire at Billingsgate.
Friends	United Kingdom	The ship was severely damaged by fire at Billingsgate.
Zealous	United Kingdom	The brig was destroyed by fire at Billingsgate.

=== 15 May ===
List of shipwrecks: 15 May 1809
Ship	State	Description
Ann	United Kingdom	The ship was wrecked in the Turks Islands. Her crew were rescued. She was on a voyage from Amelia Island, East Florida, New Spain to Jamaica.
Felix	Denmark	Gunboat War: The sloop, a privateer, was driven ashore near Felixberg, Courland Governorate by HMS Tartar (Royal Navy).

=== 18 May ===
List of shipwrecks: 18 May 1809
Ship	State	Description
Favorite	United Kingdom	The ship was sighted off Plymouth, Devon. No further trace, presumed foundered with the loss of all hands. She was on a voyage from Seville, Spain to London.

=== 21 May ===
List of shipwrecks: 21 May 1809
Ship	State	Description
Vine	United Kingdom	War of the Fifth Coalition: The ship was captured and burnt. She was on a voyage from Terceira, Spain to London.

=== 24 May ===
List of shipwrecks: 24 May 1809
Ship	State	Description
Scorpion	United Kingdom	War of the Fifth Coalition: The ship was captured off Cork by "Volant" (French Navy) and destroyed. She was on a voyage from Liverpool, Lancashire to New Providence, New Jersey, United States.
Yarmouth	United Kingdom	The ship departed from Liverpool for Heligoland. No further trace, presumed foundered with the loss of all hands.

List of shipwrecks: 25 May 1809
Ship	State	Description
HMS Cacafogo	United Kingdom	The gunboat struck rocks off Europa Point as she was entering Gibraltar Bay, and was bilged.

=== 26 May ===
List of shipwrecks: 26 May 1809
Ship	State	Description
Leith	United Kingdom	The brig was destroyed by fire at Shadwell, London.

=== Unknown date ===
List of shipwrecks: Unknown date in May 1809
Ship	State	Description
Betsey	United Kingdom	The ship was driven ashore and wrecked at Whitehaven, Cumberland. She was on a voyage from Dublin to Whitehaven.
Castle	United Kingdom	The ship was driven ashore and wrecked at Whitehaven. She was on a voyage from an Irish port to Harrington, Cumberland.
Daniel	United Kingdom	The ship foundered in the Bristol Channel off Lundy Island, Devon.
Ennerdale	United Kingdom	The ship foundered whilst on a voyage from Guernsey, Channel Islands to Gibraltar.
Enterprize	United Kingdom	War of the Fifth Coalition: The ship was captured and burnt by a French squadron. She was on a voyage from Tenerife to Madeira and Jersey, Channel Islands.
Evergreen	United Kingdom	War of the Fifth Coalition: The ship was captured and burnt by a French squadron. She was on a voyage from London to São Miguel Island, Azores.
Irene	United Kingdom	The ship was wrecked in the Orkney Islands.
Oak-Hall	United Kingdom	The whaler foundered off Greenland in mid-May with the loss of two of her crew.
Sarah Clasina	Flag unknown	The ship foundered in the Baltic Sea with the loss of all but one of her crew.
Young Charles	United Kingdom	War of the Fifth Coalition: The ship was captured and burnt by a French squadron. She was on a voyage from Gibraltar to Guernsey.
Unnamed	Prussia	The ship was lost in the Baltic Sea.

== June ==
=== 1 June ===
List of shipwrecks: 1 June 1809
Ship	State	Description
Asia	British East India Company	The East Indiaman was lost in the Bengal River, India.

=== 2 June ===
List of shipwrecks: 2 June 1809
Ship	State	Description
Alpha	United Kingdom	The ship was driven ashore and wrecked near Padstow, Cornwall. Her crew were rescued. She was on a voyage from Swansea, Glamorgan to Rochester, Kent.
Charlotta Sophia	Sweden	The ship was driven ashore at Great Yarmouth, Norfolk, United Kingdom. Her crew were rescued. She was on a voyage from Gothenburg to London.
Fanny	United Kingdom	The ship was driven ashore in Stokes Bay.
Hazard	United Kingdom	The ship foundered in the North Sea off Cromer, Norfolk. Her crew were rescued. She was on a voyage from South Shields, County Durham to London.
Janet & Catharine	United Kingdom	The ship was run down and sunk off Skagen, Denmark by Active (United Kingdom). Janet & Catharine was on a voyage from Gothenburg to Perth. Also reported as Jane and Elizabeth run down by the barque Advice (United Kingdom). Her crew were rescued.
Kingston	United Kingdom	The ship was driven ashore at Great Yarmouth. Her crew were rescued.
Sarah	United States	The ship was driven ashore and wrecked in Carnarvon Bay. She was on a voyage from New York to Gothenburg, Sweden.
Selina	United Kingdom	The ship was driven ashore in Stokes Bay.
Two Sisters	United Kingdom	The ship was driven ashore and severely damaged in Stokes Bay.

=== 3 June ===
List of shipwrecks: 3 June 1809
Ship	State	Description
Brothers	United Kingdom	The ship was wrecked at Hoymouth, Orkney Islands with the loss of all hands.
Swallow	United Kingdom	The ship was dismasted in a gale and consequently abandoned by her crew off Milford Haven, Pembrokeshire. She was on a voyage from Waterford to Swansea, Glamorgan.
Unnamed	United Kingdom	The ship was wrecked on Flotta, Orkney Islands.

=== 5 June ===
List of shipwrecks: 5 June 1809
Ship	State	Description
Jonge Alida	(Netherlands) Kingdom of Holland	The ship was driven ashore near Westkapelle, Zeeland.
Metis	United Kingdom	The ship was wrecked at The Lizard, Cornwall. Her crew were rescued. She was on a voyage from Liverpool, Lancashire to Falmouth, Cornwall and thence to Malta.
Speculation	United Kingdom	The ship was wrecked in the Cattewater. Her crew were rescued.

=== 6 June ===
List of shipwrecks: 6 June 1809
Ship	State	Description
Elizabeth	United Kingdom	The collier, a brig, foundered in the North Sea off Kingsgate, Kent. Her crew were rescued.
Nancy	United Kingdom	The ship foundered in the Atlantic Ocean off Land's End, Cornwall. Her crew were rescued. She was on a voyage from Cardiff, Glamorgan to London.

=== 15 June ===
List of shipwrecks: 15 June 1809
Ship	State	Description
Olive Branch	United Kingdom	The ship was driven ashore on the Arklow Banks, in the Irish Sea off County Wicklow. She was on a voyage from Quebec City, Lower Canada, British North America to Dublin. Olive Branch was later refloated and taken in to Dublin.

=== 16 June ===
List of shipwrecks: 16 June 1809
Ship	State	Description
HMS Agamemnon	Royal Navy	The Ardent-class ship of the line was wrecked off Maldonado, Viceroyalty of the Río de la Plata. Her crew survived.

=== 18 June ===
List of shipwrecks: 18 June 1809
Ship	State	Description
New Carlisle	United Kingdom	The ship was run down and sunk off Cape Bollard, Newfoundland, British North America by Sally (United Kingdom). Her crew were rescued.
HMS Sealark	Royal Navy	The Cuckoo-class schooner foundered in the North Sea off the Dutch coast with the loss of nineteen of her twenty crew.

=== 19 June ===
List of shipwrecks: 19 June 1809
Ship	State	Description
Albion	United Kingdom	The ship was driven ashore on Düne. She was on a voyage from Newcastle upon Tyne, Northumberland to Heligoland.

=== 25 June ===
List of shipwrecks: 25 June 1809
Ship	State	Description
Jane	United States	The ship was lost at the mouth of the Jade. She was on a voyage from Virginia to Varel, Prussia.

=== 26 June ===
List of shipwrecks: 26 June 1809
Ship	State	Description
Samuel	United Kingdom	The ship ran aground on a rock off Tortola. She was refloated.

=== 28 June ===
List of shipwrecks: 28 June 1809
Ship	State	Description
Neptune	United Kingdom	The ship struck rocks off Cape St. Francis, Newfoundland, British North America and was damaged. She was on a voyage from Newfoundland to Prince Edward Island, British North America. Neptune put into Black Head Cove.

=== Unknown date ===
List of shipwrecks: Unknown date in June 1809
Ship	State	Description
Adventure	United Kingdom	The ship was driven ashore at Bootle, Lancashire.
Arran	United Kingdom	The ship was wrecked on the island of Karak (29°15′N 50°19.5′E) in the Persian Gulf. She was on a voyage from Bengal to Bussorah, Ottoman Iraq. The cargo was expected to be saved.
Betsey	United Kingdom	The ship foundered whilst on a voyage from Swansea, Glamorgan to Padstow, Cornwall.
Bristol	United Kingdom	The ship was wrecked near Caernarfon. Her crew were rescued. She was on a voyage from Bristol, Gloucestershire to Liverpool, Lancashire.
Columbus	United Kingdom	The whaler was lost in the Shetland Islands. She was on a voyage from London to Greenland.
James and Margaret	United Kingdom	The ship was wrecket at Great Yarmouth, Norfolk. She was on a voyage from London to Gothenburg, Sweden.
Richard and Jane	United Kingdom	The ship was driven ashore in Carnarvon Bay. She was on a voyage from Cork to Liverpool. Richard and Jane was refloated in early July and taken in to Holyhead, Anglesey.
Speculation	United Kingdom	The ship was wrecked on the Maplin Sand, in the North Sea off the coast of Essex. She was on a voyage from Gothenburg to London.
Themistocles	Sweden	The ship was driven ashore at "Long Hope". She was on a voyage from St. Ubes, Portugal to Gothenburg.
Vyf Gebroeders	Heligoland	The ship departed from London for Heligoland. No further trace, presumed foundered with the loss of all hands.

== July ==
=== 2 July ===
List of shipwrecks: 2 July 1809
Ship	State	Description
Elizabeth	United Kingdom	The ship was wrecked at British Honduras. Her crew were rescued.

=== 8 July ===
List of shipwrecks: 8 July 1809
Ship	State	Description
HMS Solebay	Royal Navy	The ship ran aground and was wrecked in the Senegal River during an operation by the Royal Navy to capture Senegal from the French.

=== 13 July ===
List of shipwrecks: 13 July 1809
Ship	State	Description
Little James	United States	The ship ran aground on Düne. She was on a voyage from Salem, Massachusetts to Tönningen, Duchy of Holstein.

=== 18 July ===
List of shipwrecks: 18 July 1809
Ship	State	Description
Peggy	United Kingdom	The sloop was wrecked at Montrose, Forfarshire. Her crew were rescued. She was on a voyage from Aberdeen to Montrose.

=== 19 July ===
List of shipwrecks: 19 July 1809
Ship	State	Description
Experiment	(United Kingdom of Great Britain and Ireland) Jamaica	The ship was wrecked in Long Bay, Jamaica. Her crew were rescued. She was on a voyage from India to Jamaica.

=== 21 July ===
List of shipwrecks: 21 July 1809
Ship	State	Description
Brunswick	United Kingdom	The ship foundered in the Grand Banks of Newfoundland. Her crew were rescued. She was on a voyage from London to Quebec City, Lower Canada, British North America.

=== 23 July ===
List of shipwrecks: 23 July 1809
Ship	State	Description
Mary	United Kingdom	The ship was last seen on this date whilst on a voyage from Martinique to Liverpool, Lancashire. Presumed to have subsequently foundered with the loss of all hands.

=== 25 July ===
List of shipwrecks: 25 July 1809
Ship	State	Description
Hayti	United Kingdom	The ship struck a rock in the Cape Verde Islands and was wrecked. She was on a voyage from Bristol, Gloucestershire to Gibraltar and Brazil

=== 27 July ===
List of shipwrecks: 27 July 1809
Ship	State	Description
Two Friends	United Kingdom	The ship was wrecked on the coast of County Donegal. Her crew were rescued. She was on a voyage from New Providence, New Jersey, United States to Liverpool, Lancashire.

=== 29 July ===
List of shipwrecks: 29 July 1809
Ship	State	Description
Tyson	United Kingdom	War of the Fifth Coalition: The ship was captured by the privateer Superieure (France) off Saint Croix, Virgin Islands. She was set afire and sunk.

=== Unknown date ===
List of shipwrecks: Unknown date in July 1809
Ship	State	Description
Brunswick	United Kingdom	The ship foundered in the Grand Banks of Newfoundland on either 21 or 27 July, according to different sources. Her crew were rescued. She was on a voyage from London to Quebec City, Lower Canada, British North America.
Dominica Packet	United Kingdom	The ship capsized at Liverpool, Lancashire.
Drie Gebroeders	Heligoland	The ship was lost with all hands. She was on a voyage from London, United Kingdom to Heligoland.
Fame	United Kingdom	The ship was driven ashore in Dundalk Bay and severely damaged. She was later refloated. Fame was on a voyage from Dundalk, County Louth to London.
Hoffnung	Flag unknown	The ship capsized 2 leagues (6 nautical miles (11 km)) off Lorient, Morbihan, France with the loss of all hands. She was later taken in to Port-Louis, Morbihan.
Pilgrim	United Kingdom	The ship was wrecked at Gijón, Spain. She was on a voyage from Liverpool to a Spanish port.
Rising Sun	United Kingdom	The ship sank at Liverpool.
Spring	United Kingdom	The ship was driven ashore at Bay Ness. Her crew were rescued.

== August ==
=== 2 August ===
List of shipwrecks: 2 August 1809
Ship	State	Description
Three Sisters	United Kingdom	The ship was last seen on this date whilst on a voyage from Antigua to Liverpool, Lancashire. Presumed subsequently foundered in a hurricane with the loss of all hands.
William	United Kingdom	The ship departed from Palermo, Kingdom of Sicily for Terra Nova. No further trace, although it was thought she may have been captured and taken in to Naples.
Three unnamed vessels	Royal Navy	War of the Fifth Coalition, Walcheren Campaign: The pinnaces were sunk off Walcheren, Zeeland, Kingdom of Holland by shore-based artillery.

=== 3 August ===
List of shipwrecks: 3 August 1809
Ship	State	Description
HMS Lark	Royal Navy	The Cormorant-class ship-sloop foundered off San Domingo with the loss of 117 of her 120 crew. Survivors were rescued by HMS Moselle (Royal Navy).
Speedwell	United Kingdom	The sloop was lost near Milford, Pembrokeshire with the loss of all hands.

=== 4 August ===
List of shipwrecks: 4 August 1809
Ship	State	Description
Ruby	United Kingdom	The ship was wrecked on Scroby Sands, Norfolk. Her crew were rescued. She was on a voyage from Newcastle-upon-Tyne, Northumberland to London.
Unnamed	Flag unknown	The ship was wrecked on Scroby Sands. Her crew were rescued.

=== 6 August ===
List of shipwrecks: 6 August 1809
Ship	State	Description
Albertina	United Kingdom	The ship ran aground in the Isles of Scilly and was damaged. She was on a voyage from London to Liverpool, Lancashire.
Beckford	United Kingdom	The ship was driven ashore at Exmouth, Devon.
Elizabeth	United Kingdom	The ship was wrecked at North Meols, Lancashire. Her crew were rescued. She was on a voyage from Greenock, Renfrewshire to Liverpool, Lancashire.
Peace	United Kingdom	The ship was wrecked near Salcombe, Devon with the loss of all hands. She was on a voyage from Gibraltar to London.
Samuel	United Kingdom	The ship sprang a leak and foundered in the North Sea off "Marsh". Her crew were rescued. She was on a voyage from Great Yarmouth, Norfolk to Sunderland, County Durham.

=== 8 August ===
List of shipwrecks: 8 August 1809
Ship	State	Description
Amelia	United Kingdom	The ship ran aground on the Geer Rock, Penzance, Cornwall and was severely damaged. She was on a voyage from Penzance to Bristol, Gloucestershire. Amelia was refloated on 10 August and taken in to Penzance.

=== 10 August ===
List of shipwrecks: 10 August 1809
Ship	State	Description
Dwina	United Kingdom	The ship was struck by lightning in the Grimsby Dock, London. She was destroyed by the consequent fire.
Lord Keith	United Kingdom	The ship was lost in the Farne Islands, Northumberland. Her crew were rescued. She was on a voyage from London to the Firth of Forth.
Rosina	United Kingdom	The ship was struck by lightning in the East India Dock, London. She was severely damaged by the consequent fire.

=== 11 August ===
List of shipwrecks: 11 August 1809
Ship	State	Description
Alexander	United Kingdom	The ship capsized in the Queen's Dock, Liverpool, Lancashire.

=== 12 August ===
List of shipwrecks: 12 August 1809
Ship	State	Description
Dragon	United Kingdom	The ship departed from Grenada for Newfoundland, British North America. No further trace, presumed foundered with the loss of all hands.

=== 13 August ===
List of shipwrecks: 13 August 1809
Ship	State	Description
Charles and Frederick	United Kingdom	The ship capsized on the Stoney Binks. Her crew were rescued. She was on a voyage from Gothenburg, Sweden to Grimsby, Lincolnshire.
Fama de Lisbon	Portugal	The ship was lost at Pernambuco, Brazil. Her crew were rescued. She was on a voyage from London, United Kingdom to Pernambuco.
John	United Kingdom	The ship was wrecked in the Turks Islands. Her crew were rescued. She was on a voyage from Liverpool, Lancashire to New Providence, New Jersey, United States.

=== 16 August ===
List of shipwrecks: 16 August 1809
Ship	State	Description
Janet	United Kingdom	The ship ran aground in the English Channel off The Lizard, Cornwall. Her crew were rescued.

=== 17 August ===
List of shipwrecks: 17 August 1809
Ship	State	Description
Gold Hunter	United Kingdom	The ship was driven ashore and wrecked on The Shingles, Isle of Wight. She was on a voyage from Swanage, Dorset to Portsmouth, Hampshire.
Jason	United Kingdom	The ship was wrecked on Orchilla, Venezuela. Her crew were rescued. She was on a voyage from the Clyde to Trinidad and Curaçao.

=== 19 August ===
List of shipwrecks: 19 August 1809
Ship	State	Description
Jenny	United Kingdom	The ship was run down and sunk in the North Sea off Filey, Yorkshire with the loss of all but two of her crew. She was on a voyage from South Shields, County Durham to London.
Liberty	United Kingdom	The ship foundered in the North Sea off Happisburgh, Norfolk. Her crew were rescued. She was on a voyage from South Shields to London.

=== 24 August ===
List of shipwrecks: 24 August 1809
Ship	State	Description
Corsica	United Kingdom	The ship was abandoned in the Atlantic Ocean. Her crew were rescued by Eagle (United Kingdom).

=== 26 August ===
List of shipwrecks: 26 August 1809
Ship	State	Description
Fly	United Kingdom	The ship departed from The Downs for Lisbon, Portugal. No further trace, presumed foundered with the loss of all hands.
Matchless	United States	The ship foundered on this date.

=== 27 August ===
List of shipwrecks: 27 August 1809
Ship	State	Description
Ann	United Kingdom	The ship was last seen on this date whilst on a voyage from Jamaica to London. Presumed subsequently foundered in a hurricane with the loss of all hands.
Atlas	United Kingdom	The ship was last seen on this date whilst on a voyage from Barbados to Bristol, Gloucestershire. Presumed subsequently foundered in a hurricane with the loss of all hands.
Dwina	United Kingdom	The ship was last seen on this date whilst on a voyage from Martinique to Liverpool, Lancashire. Presumed subsequently foundered in a hurricane with the loss of all hands.
Bellona	United Kingdom	The ship was last seen on this date whilst on a voyage from Jamaica to London. Presumed subsequently foundered in a hurricane with the loss of all hands.
Express	United Kingdom	The cutter foundered in the Atlantic Ocean (41°00′N 42°00′W) in a hurricane.
Good Intent	United Kingdom	The ship was last seen on this date whilst on a voyage from Antigua to Belfast, County Antrim. Presumed subsequently foundered in a hurricane with the loss of all hands.
Margaret and Ann	United Kingdom	The whaler was destroyed by fire at "Cape Richness". She was on a voyage from Iceland to London.
Rising Sun	United States	The ship capsized with some loss of life. Survivors were rescued by Samuel Barnett (United States). Rising Sun was on a voyage from Boston, Massachusetts to Porto, Portugal.

=== 29 August ===
List of shipwrecks: 29 August 1809
Ship	State	Description
Regulus	United States	The ship foundered whilst on a voyage from Madeira to New York.
William Grey	United States	The ship ran aground off the west coast of Bermuda and was wrecked. Her crew were rescued. She was on a voyage from the Kennebec River to Jamaica.

=== 30 August ===
List of shipwrecks: 30 August 1809
Ship	State	Description
Polly	United States	The ship was dismasted and consequently abandoned by her crew. She was on a voyage from Baltimore, Maryland to London.

=== 31 August ===
List of shipwrecks: 31 August 1809
Ship	State	Description
HMS Foxhound	Royal Navy	The Cruizer-class brig-sloop foundered in the Atlantic Ocean with the loss of all hands.
Lion	United Kingdom	The ship was driven ashore near Dundrum, County Dublin. She was on a voyage from Dublin to Quebec City, Lower Canada, British North America.
Paquete do Porto	Portugal	The ship sailed from The Downs for Rio de Janeiro. No further trace, presumed foundered with the loss of all hands.
Robert	United States	The ship was wrecked on Cape Henry, Virginia. Her crew were rescued. She was on a voyage from Jamaica to Philadelphia, Pennsylvania.

=== Unknown date ===
List of shipwrecks: Unknown date in August 1809
Ship	State	Description
Alonzo	United States	The ship foundered in the North Sea off Texel, North Holland, Holland.
Amelia	United Kingdom	The ship ran aground. She was on a voyage from Bristol, Gloucestershire, to Baltimore, Maryland, United States. She was refloated and put back to Bristol.
Bremen	Bremen	The ship departed from Norfolk, Virginia, United States for London, United Kingdom. No further trace, presumed foundered with the loss of all hands.
HMS Contest	Royal Navy	The gun-brig foundered in the Atlantic Ocean off the Azores, Portugal with the loss of all hands.
Devaynes	United Kingdom	The ship ran aground in the Bengal River. She was refloated and placed under repair.
HMS Dominica	Royal Navy	The schooner foundered off Tortola during a hurricane. There were either three or five survivors.
Esperance	Stettin	The ship ran aground on the Lemon and Ore Sand, in the North Sea off Great Yarmouth, Norfolk, United Kingdom and was abandoned by her crew. She subsequently refloated. On 17 August HMS Espeigle (Royal Navy) discovered her at sea and took Esperance in to Heligoland.
Horizon	United States	The ship ran aground in the River Thames at Northfleet, Kent, United Kingdom. She was on a voyage from New York, United States to London.
Ocean	United Kingdom	The ship ran aground in the Bengal River. She was refloated and placed under repair.
HMS Pike	Royal Navy	The Ballahoo-class schooner foundered.
Resolution	United Kingdom	The ship was wrecked on the Devon coast with the loss of all hands. She was on a voyage from Grenada to London.
Royal Edward	United Kingdom	The West Indiaman was driven ashore and wrecked on Selsey Bill, Sussex.
Unnamed	United Kingdom	The sloop was wrecked near The Lizard, Cornwall. She was on a voyage from Teignmouth, Devon to Greenock, Renfrewshire.

== September ==
=== 1 September ===
List of shipwrecks: 1 September 1809
Ship	State	Description
Anna Maria	United Kingdom	The ship was abandoned in the Atlantic Ocean (43°40′N 50°16′W). Her crew were rescued by John (United Kingdom).
Unnamed	United Kingdom	The ship capsized at Liverpool, Lancashire.

=== 2 September ===
List of shipwrecks: 2 September 1809
Ship	State	Description
Friendship	United Kingdom	The ship foundered in the Irish Sea off Milford Haven, Pembrokeshire. She was on a voyage from Bridgwater, Somerset to Southampton, Hampshire.
Patriot	United Kingdom	The ship was abandoned in the Atlantic Ocean whilst on a voyage from Kinsale, County Cork to Quebec City, Lower Canada, British North America. She was reboarded by some of her crew and taken in to Newfoundland.
Valentine	United Kingdom	The ship was lost near Guayaquil, Viceroyalty of New Granada with the loss of all but four of her crew.

=== 3 September ===
List of shipwrecks: 3 September 1809
Ship	State	Description
Dispatch	United Kingdom	The ship was lost on this date. Her crew were rescued.
Minerva	United Kingdom	The ship foundered in the English Channel off The Lizard, Cornwall. Her crew were rescued. She was on a voyage from Liverpool, Lancashire to Malta.
Unnamed	Royal Navy	War of the Fifth Coalition, Walcheren Campaign: The corvette was wrecked on the Oost Callot Bank, off the coast of Zeeland, Kingdom of Holland.

=== 4 September ===
List of shipwrecks: 4 September 1809
Ship	State	Description
Ann Jane	United Kingdom	The ship was abandoned in the Atlantic Ocean. She was on a voyage from Liverpool, Lancashire to Quebec City, Lower Canada, British North America.
Hull Packet	United Kingdom	The ship was driven ashore near "Huntley Fort". She was on a voyage from Leith, Lothian to Hull, Yorkshire.

=== 5 September ===
List of shipwrecks: 5 September 1809
Ship	State	Description
Concordia	United Kingdom	The ship was driven ashore near Visby, Sweden and was abandoned. She was refloated on 7 September and taken in to "Rohenamn".

=== 7 September ===
List of shipwrecks: 7 September 1809
Ship	State	Description
Concordia	United Kingdom	The ship ran aground on Scroby Sands, Norfolk. She was on a voyage from Sunderland, County Durham to London.
Speedwell	United Kingdom	Her crew abandoned the barge in the English Channel off Seaford, Sussex with the loss of three of the five people on board. She subsequently came ashore east of the mouth of the River Cuckmere and was wrecked. Speedwell was on a voyage from Arundel and/or Littlehampton, Sussex to London.

=== 10 September ===
List of shipwrecks: 10 September 1809
Ship	State	Description
Bonafide	(France) First French Empire	The ship was lost on the Dutch coast.
Jonge Juffrow	(France) First French Empire	The ship was lost on the Dutch coast.
Jonge Wilhelm	Flag unknown	The ship sprang a leak and was abandoned by her crew. They were rescued by Swanwick (United Kingdom).
Maria	(France) First French Empire	The ship was lost on the Dutch coast.
Schneeder	(France) First French Empire	The ship was lost on the Dutch coast.
Vriendschaplust	(France) First French Empire	The ship was lost on the Dutch coast.

=== 11 September ===
List of shipwrecks: 11 September 1809
Ship	State	Description
Fanny	United Kingdom	The ship was driven ashore and wrecked near Padstow, Cornwall. She was on a voyage from Waterford to Chichester, Sussex.

=== 13 September ===
List of shipwrecks: 13 September 1809
Ship	State	Description
Ann & Mary	United Kingdom	The ship departed from "the Motherbank". No further trace, presumed foundered with the loss of all hands. She was on a voyage from Mogadore, Morocco to London.
Shah Ardaseer	United Kingdom	The India-built country ship was destroyed by fire at Bombay. She was on a voyage from Bombay to London.

=== 14 September ===
List of shipwrecks: 14 September 1809
Ship	State	Description
Jenny	United Kingdom	The ship was lost at the mouth of the Groot River, Africa with the loss of seven of her crew. She was on a voyage from Platerburgh Bay to the Cape of Good Hope.
Lady Nelson	United Kingdom	The ship was lost near the Shellicks, Ireland. She was on a voyage from Porto, Portugal to Liverpool, Lancashire.

=== 15 September ===
List of shipwrecks: 15 September 1809
Ship	State	Description
Kitty	(United Kingdom of Great Britain and Ireland) Jersey	The ship was wrecked on the coast of Africa. Her crew were rescued. She was on a voyage from Jersey to the Canary Islands.
HCS Strombolo	British East India Company	The ketch foundered with the loss of sixteen crew. Seventeen people were rescued by HCS Mornington ( British East India Company). Also reported as 15 October.

=== 17 September ===
List of shipwrecks: 17 September 1809
Ship	State	Description
Anna Catharina	Flag unknown	The ship was driven ashore and wrecked on Anholt, Denmark. Her crew were rescued.
Balance	United Kingdom	The ship was driven ashore and wrecked on Anholt. Her crew were rescued.
Henrietta	United Kingdom	The ship was driven ashore and damaged on Anholt. She was later refloated.
Prosperity	United Kingdom	The ship was driven ashore and wrecked on Anholt. Her crew were rescued.
Walpole	British East India Company	The East Indiaman foundered in the North Sea off Margate, Kent during 1809.

=== 18 September ===
List of shipwrecks: 18 September 1809
Ship	State	Description
Bee	United Kingdom	The ship was driven ashore between the mouth of the River Tees and Saltburn-by-the-Sea, Yorkshire. Her crew were rescued.
Demerara	United Kingdom	The ship was driven ashore and damaged in the River Mersey. She was on a voyage from Liverpool, Lancashire to the Clyde. Demerara refloated on 19 September and taken in to Liverpool.
Farmer's Increase	United Kingdom	The ship was driven ashore between the mouth of the River Tees and Saltburn. Her crew were rescued.
George	United Kingdom	The ship was driven ashore in the River Mersey. She was on a voyage from Liverpool to Philadelphia, Pennsylvania, United States. George was refloated on 20 September.
Harmonia	United Kingdom	The ship was driven ashore and wrecked in Bootle Bay. She was on a voyage from Liverpool to Pernambuco, Brazil.
Juno	United Kingdom	The ship was driven ashore on the coast of Lincolnshire. She was on a voyage from Cádiz, Spain to Hull, Yorkshire. She was refloated and taken in to Grimsby, Lincolnshire.
Margaret	United Kingdom	The ship was driven ashore and wrecked in Bootle Bay. She was on a voyage from Liverpool to Rio de Janeiro.
Minerva Smyth	United States	The ship was driven ashore in the River Mersey, She was on a voyage from Liverpool to Philadelphia, Pennsylvania. Minerva Smyth was refloated on 20 September and taken in to Liverpool.
Peggy	United Kingdom	The ship was driven ashore on the French coast. She was taken possession of by the French, refloated and taken in to "Delette", near Cherbourg, Seine-Inférieure.
Sarah	United Kingdom	The ship was driven ashore in Bootle Bay. She was on a voyage from Liverpool to Heligoland. Sarah was later refloated.
Stephen	United Kingdom	The ship was driven ashore in the River Mersey. She was on a voyage from New Orleans, Louisiana Territory to New York, United States and Liverpool.
Susannah	United Kingdom	The ship was driven ashore at Blyth, Northumberland. She was later refloated and taken in to South Shields, County Durham.
Three Brothers	United Kingdom	The ship was driven ashore between the mouth of the River Tees and Saltburn. Her crew were rescued.

=== 19 September ===
List of shipwrecks: 19 September 1809
Ship	State	Description
Active	United Kingdom	The ship was driven ashore near Whitby, Yorkshire. Her crew were rescued. She was later refloated and taken in to Whitby for repairs.
Flying Fish	United Kingdom	The ship was driven ashore at Whitby. Her crew were rescued.
Goodintent	United Kingdom	The ship was driven ashore near Whitby. Her crew were rescued.
Peggies	United Kingdom	The ship was wrecked on Skagen, Denmark. Her crew were rescued but were made prisoners. She was on a voyage from Stockholm, Sweden to Fisherrow, Lothian.

=== 20 September ===
List of shipwrecks: 20 September 1809
Ship	State	Description
Unnamed	Royal Navy	War of the Fifth Coalition, Walcheren Campaign: The cutter was wrecked off Vlissingen, Zeeland, Kingdom of Holland.

=== 22 September ===
List of shipwrecks: 22 September 1809
Ship	State	Description
HMS Curieux	Royal Navy	The corvette ran aground on a reef off the Îles des Saintes. Her crew were rescued by HMS Hazard (Royal Navy) before she was set afire to prevent her capture by the French Navy.
William	United Kingdom	The ship was driven ashore and wrecked in Mill Bay, Devon. Her crew were rescued.

=== 25 September ===
List of shipwrecks: 25 September 1809
Ship	State	Description
Onderneeming	(France) First French Empire	The ship departed from Arkhangelsk, Russia. No further trace, presumed foundered with the loss of all hands.
Uryl	Russia	The ship was destroyed by fire at Cronstadt. Her crew were rescued.

=== 26 September ===
List of shipwrecks: 26 September 1809
Ship	State	Description
Britannia	United Kingdom	The ship was wrecked on rocks near Youghall, County Cork. She was on a voyage from Youghall to Liverpool, Lancashire.
Clyde	United Kingdom	The ship was wrecked in the North Sea off Wells-next-the-Sea, Norfolk with the loss of all but one of those on board. She was on a voyage from London to Boston, Lincolnshire.

=== 27 September ===
List of shipwrecks: 27 September 1809
Ship	State	Description
Jane	United States	The ship was driven ashore in Bootle Bay, Lancashire, United Kingdom. She was on a voyage from New York to Liverpool, Lancashire.
Joseph & Phoebe	United States	The ship was driven ashore near Londonderry.
Lovely Peggy	United Kingdom	The ship was driven off Heligoland crewless and came ashore on the coast of Jutland. She was subsequently taken in to Tönningen, Duchy of Holstein.
Pomona	United States	The ship was driven ashore in Bootle Bay. She was on a voyage from Charleston, South Carolina to Liverpool.

=== 28 September ===
List of shipwrecks: 28 September 1809
Ship	State	Description
Indian	United Kingdom	The ship departed from Arkhangelsk, Russia. No further trace, presumed foundered with the loss of all hands.

=== 29 September ===
List of shipwrecks: 29 September 1809
Ship	State	Description
Ceres	United Kingdom	The ship was driven ashore at Sunderland, County Durham.
Frau Magdalena	Flag unknown	The ship departed from Arkhangelsk, Russia. No further trace, presumed foundered with the loss of all hands.

=== 30 September ===
List of shipwrecks: 30 September 1809
Ship	State	Description
Commerce	United Kingdom	The ship was driven ashore at Whitby, North Riding of Yorkshire. Her crew were rescued. Commerce was refloated in October and taken in to Sunderland, County Durham for repairs.
Lively	United Kingdom	The ship was driven ashore at Whitby. Her crew were rescued. She was refloated in October and taken in to Sunderland.

=== Unknown date ===
List of shipwrecks: Unknown date in September 1809
Ship	State	Description
Abendstein	Russia	The ship was wrecked near Karlskrona, Sweden.
Ann and Mary	United Kingdom	The ship was abandoned in the Atlantic Ocean whilst on a voyage from New Brunswick, British North America to Aberdeen. She was discovered in a waterlogged state at 44°00′N 49°27′W on 11 September.
Ann Jane	United Kingdom	The ship foundered before 22 September. Her crew were rescued by Janvrin ( (United Kingdom of Great Britain and Ireland) Guernsey).
Brisco	United Kingdom	The ship was driven ashore and wrecked on Heligoland.
Ceres	United Kingdom	The ship was driven ashore in Carnarvon Bay. She was on a voyage from Liverpool, Lancashire to Cádiz, Spain.
Diana	United Kingdom	The ship was driven ashore and wrecked on Heligoland.
Duncan	United Kingdom	The ship was wrecked at Milford, Pembrokeshire. She was on a voyage from Westport, County Mayo to London.
Duration	United Kingdom	The ship was driven ashore and wrecked at Margate, Kent. She was on a voyage from Cardiff, Glamorgan to London.
Eliza	United Kingdom	The ship was wrecked on the Isle of May, Fife.
Endeavour	United Kingdom	The ship was driven ashore near Padstow, Cornwall. She was on a voyage from Cork to London. Endeavour was later refloated and taken in to Padstow.
Hope	United Kingdom	The ship capsized in the Irish Sea off the Poolbeg Lighthouse, Dublin.
Margaret	United Kingdom	The ship was driven ashore at Bootle, Lancashire.
Minerva	United Kingdom	The ship was lost near Falmouth, Cornwall. She was on a voyage from Portsmouth, Hampshire to Malta.
Prospect	United Kingdom	The ship was driven ashore on Düne.
Reindeer	United Kingdom	The ship was driven ashore and wrecked on Heligoland.
Sally	United Kingdom	The ship was destroyed by fire in the North Sea. Her crew were rescued by HMS Talbot (Royal Navy).
Seaflower	United Kingdom	The ship was driven ashore and wrecked on Heligoland.
Speedwell	United Kingdom	The ship barge was lost near Arendal, Norway. She was on a voyage from Arendal to London.
Stadt Berlin	Prussia	The ship was wrecked on the Norwegian coast. She was on a voyage from Emden to a Norwegian port.
Twee Gebroeders	Heligoland	The ship was driven ashore and wrecked on Heligoland.
Vrow Anna	Heligoland	The ship was driven ashore on Düne.

== October ==
=== 1 October ===
List of shipwrecks: 1 October 1809
Ship	State	Description
Gatcambe	United Kingdom	The ship was lost in the Bristol Channel with the loss of three of her five crew. She was on a voyage from Swansea, Glamorgan to Newnham, Gloucestershire.

=== 3 October ===
List of shipwrecks: 3 October 1809
Ship	State	Description
Thomas Wentworth	United Kingdom	The ship departed from Portsmouth, Hampshire for Quebec City, Lower Canada, British North America. No further trace, presumed foundered with the loss of all hands.

=== 4 October ===
List of shipwrecks: 4 October 1809
Ship	State	Description
Henrick	United Kingdom	The ship was wrecked at Arkhangelsk, Russia.
Lovely Hannah	United Kingdom	The ship foundered in the Indian Ocean off Ceylon whilst on a voyage from Bengal to Bombay.

=== 6 October ===
List of shipwrecks: 6 October 1809
Ship	State	Description
No. 22	Imperial Russian Navy	The transport ship ran aground and was wrecked at sv:Vahakari in the Gulf of Finland with the loss of one life. She was on a voyage from Kronstadt to Kotka, Grand Duchy of Finland.
No. 48	Imperial Russian Navy	The transport ship was driven ashore and wrecked on Sommers in the Gulf of Finland. Her crew were rescued. She was on a voyage from Kronstadt to Sveaborg, Grand Duchy of Finland.

=== 7 October ===
List of shipwrecks: 7 October 1809
Ship	State	Description
Belinda	United Kingdom	The ship departed from Liverpool, Lancashire to Newfoundland. No further trace, presumed foundered with the loss of all hands.

=== 8 October ===
List of shipwrecks: 8 October 1809
Ship	State	Description
Minerva	United Kingdom	The ship was wrecked 12 nautical miles (22 km) east of Mazaro, Kingdom of Sicily. She was on a voyage from Malta to Hull, Yorkshire.

=== 11 October ===
List of shipwrecks: 11 October 1809
Ship	State	Description
Eole	France	The brig, prize to HMS Medusa and HMS Surveillante (both Royal Navy), was driven ashore at Penzance, Cornwall, United Kingdom.
Hope	United Kingdom	The ship was lost in Dundalk Bay. She was on a voyage from Liverpool, Lancashire to Newfoundland, British North America.
Thomas and Elizabeth	United Kingdom	The ship was abandoned in the Atlantic Ocean 5 leagues (15 nautical miles (28 km)) off St Ives, Cornwall. She was on a voyage from St Ives to Swansea, Glamorgan.

=== 12 October ===
List of shipwrecks: 12 October 1809
Ship	State	Description
Greyhound	United States	The brig was driven ashore in a hurricane at Dominica.
Susannah	United Kingdom	The ship was driven ashore and wrecked in a hurricane at Dominica.

=== 13 October ===
List of shipwrecks: 13 October 1809
Ship	State	Description
Atlas	United Kingdom	The ship collided with John and Mary (United Kingdom) and was driven ashore at Plymouth, Devon. Atlas was on a voyage from Plymouth to Gibraltar. She was refloated.
Fortitude	United Kingdom	The ship was driven ashore on Martinique. She was subsequently wrecked in a gale at the end of October.
Greyhound	United States	The brig was driven ashore and wrecked at Dominica.
Susannah	United Kingdom	The full-rigged ship was driven ashore and wrecked at Dominica.

=== 14 October ===
List of shipwrecks: 14 October 1809
Ship	State	Description
Lady Nelson	United Kingdom	The ship was wrecked on the Irish coast with the loss of all but two of her crew, She was on a voyage from Porto, Portugal to Liverpool, Lancashire.
Yekaterina (Екатерина, 'Catherine')	Imperial Russian Navy	The galiot was driven ashore in the mouth of the Bolshaya. All on board were rescued. She was on a voyage from Okhotsk to Petropavlovsk. She had broken up by 30 October.

=== 15 October ===
List of shipwrecks: 15 October 1809
Ship	State	Description
Industry	United Kingdom	The brig was wrecked near Dursey Island, County Cork with the loss of all nine people on board.

=== 18 October ===
List of shipwrecks: 18 October 1809
Ship	State	Description
Forsoket	Sweden	The ship was lost near Karlskrona. She was on a voyage from London, United Kingdom to Norrköping.
Frow Maria	Sweden	The ship was lost off Karlskrona. Her crew were rescued. She was on a voyage from Gothenburg to Stockholm.
Peggy	(United Kingdom of Great Britain and Ireland) British North America	The ship foundered whilst on a voyage from St. John's, Newfoundland to St. Julien's, Newfoundland.

=== 22 October ===
List of shipwrecks: 22 October 1809
Ship	State	Description
Harriet	United Kingdom	The sloop foundered at Falmouth, Cornwall.

=== 23 October ===
List of shipwrecks: 23 October 1809
Ship	State	Description
Isabella	United Kingdom	The ship was driven ashore and wrecked at St. Pierre, Martinique.
Unnamed	United States	The ship was driven ashore on Martinique.
Three unnamed vessels	Flags unknown	The schooners were driven ashore on Martinique.

=== 24 October ===
List of shipwrecks: 24 October 1809
Ship	State	Description
Ceres	United Kingdom	The ship departed Newfoundland, British North America for Gibraltar. No further trace, presumed foundered in the Atlantic Ocean with the loss of all hands.

=== 25 October ===
List of shipwrecks: 25 October 1809
Ship	State	Description
Genriyetta (Генриетта, 'Henrietta')	Imperial Russian Navy	The transport ship ran aground near Sveaborg, between Mjölö and sv:Svartbådan, and broke up three days later. Her crew were rescued. She was on a voyage from Kotka to Sveaborg, Grand Duchy of Finland.
Pollux (Поллукс)	Imperial Russian Navy	The frigate ran aground 8 nautical miles (15 km) west of the fi:Orrengrund Lighthouse. She was refloated, but subsequently hit an underwater rock and foundered with the loss of 140 of the 232 people on board. The survivors made it to the nearest island, sv:Enskär (or another island of its group (Note: Period maps don't name the individual islands. For example, on a 1793 map the label Yensker ili Pitkoloda (lit. Enskär or Pitkäluoto) is attached to the entire group and placed next to its largest island, sv:Yttre Aspskär.)). She was on a voyage from sv:Lehtinen to Kronstadt. A contemporary British source places the wreck off Sveaborg, without providing any further detail.
Uryl	Sweden	The ship was destroyed by fire at Kronstadt. Her crew were rescued.
Two unnamed vessels	French Navy	War of the Fifth Coalition: The ships of the line were burnt by their crews in an action with a Royal Navy squadron led by Lord Collingwood. They were on a voyage from Toulon, Var to Barcelona, Spain.
Two unnamed vessels	French Navy	War of the Fifth Coalition: The ship of the line and a frigate were driven ashore and wrecked on the coast of Var in an action with a Royal Navy squadron led by Lord Collingwood. They were on a voyage from Toulon to Barcelona.
Seven unnamed vessels	United Kingdom	War of the Fifth Coalition> A frigate and six transport ship were burnt by a Royal Navy squadron led by Lord Collingwood. They were on a voyage from Toulon to Barcelona.

=== 26 October ===
List of shipwrecks: 26 October 1809
Ship	State	Description
Lion	French Navy	Napoleonic Wars: The Téméraire-class ship of the line ran aground near Sète, Hérault. She was set afire and destroyed by her crew to prevent her being captured by the Royal Navy.
Robuste	French Navy	Napoleonic Wars: The Bucentaure-class ship of the line ran aground near Frontignan, Hérault. She was set afire and destroyed by her crew to prevent her being captured by the Royal Navy.

=== 27 October ===
List of shipwrecks: 27 October 1809
Ship	State	Description
Elizabeth	Russia	The ship foundered in the Baltic Sea off Narva.
Maria	United Kingdom	The ship departed from Plymouth, Devon for Seville, Spain. No further trace, presumed foundered with the loss of all hands.

=== 30 October ===
List of shipwrecks: 30 October 1809
Ship	State	Description
March	United Kingdom	The ship was wrecked at Skagen, Denmark. She was on a voyage from London to a Baltic port.

=== 31 October ===
List of shipwrecks: 31 October 1809
Ship	State	Description
Lemproye	French Navy	Napoleonic Wars: The armed store ship was driven ashore near Rosas, Spain by HMS Apollo and HMS Invincible (both Royal Navy). She was burnt to avoid capture.
Victoire	French Navy	Napoleonic Wars: The ship was driven ashore near Rosas by HMS Apollo and HMS Invincible (both Royal Navy). She was burnt to avoid capture.

=== Unknown date ===
List of shipwrecks: Unknown date in October 1809
Ship	State	Description
Adeona	Sweden	The ship was driven ashore on Anholt, Denmark. She was on a voyage from Stockholm to London, United Kingdom.
Aurora	Russia	The ship was driven ashore at Reval.
Britannia	United Kingdom	The transport ship was wrecked at Vlissingen, Zeeland, First French Empire.
Carl Gustaff	Sweden	The brig was driven ashore on Anholt. She was on a voyage from Carlshamn to London. Carl Gustaff later refloated and was taken in to Gothenburg.
Catharina	United Kingdom	The ship was wrecked on the Dutch coast. She was on a voyage from London to Heligoland.
Commerce	United Kingdom	The ship was driven ashore in the Isles of Scilly. She was on a voyage from Gibraltar to London.
Commerce	United Kingdom	The ship was lost in the White Sea.
Concordia	United Kingdom	The ship foundered in the North Sea off Heligoland.
Eliza and Mary	United Kingdom	The ship was driven ashore on the Isle of Man. She was on a voyage from Liverpool, Lancashire to "Holmstadt".
Enterprize	Sweden	The ship was lost in Åland.
Endraght	(France) First French Empire	The ship, a prize to HMS Censor (Royal Navy), was driven ashore at Great Yarmouth, Norfolk, United Kingdom.
Expedition	United Kingdom	The ship foundered in the North Sea off Heligoland.
Freedom	United Kingdom	The ship was driven ashore and wrecked between Dartmouth and Start Point, Devon.
Friede	Flag unknown	The ship was lost near Domesnes Norway.
George	United States	The brig was run ashore at Guadeloupe by HMS Pelter (Royal Navy). She was refloated and taken in to Antigua by HMS Pelter.
Heart of Oak	United Kingdom	The ship was wrecked at Veere, Zeeland, First French Empire. She was on a voyage from Hull to Heligoland.
Kleine Famalie	Flag unknown	The ship was destroyed by fire five days after sailing from Arkhangelsk, Russia.
Louisa	United Kingdom	The ship was driven ashore at Courtmacsherry, County Cork. She was on a voyage from Malta to London.
Louisa Johanna	Sweden	The ship was wrecked at "Westerwick", Denmark. She was on a voyage from Stockholm to Kalmar.
Marianna	France	The ship was lost on the French coast.
Mary	(United Kingdom of Great Britain and Ireland) Province Wellesley	The ship departed from Manilla, Spanish East Indies for Penang. She had not arrived by 29 December, presumed foundered.
Prospect	United Kingdom	The ship was wrecked at Heligoland.
Rafail	United Kingdom	The Yaroslav-class ship of the line was destroyed by fire in the Tagus.
Resolution	United States	The ship was captured by the privateer Decide (France). She was on a voyage from London to New York. She was discovered in the Atlantic Ocean (47°N 16°W) by Vedra (United Kingdom), which put some of her crew aboard. They took her in to Liverpool, where she arrived on 31 October.
True Briton	United Kingdom	The ship was driven ashore and wrecked at Saltfleet, Lincolnshire with the loss of four of her crew. She was on a voyage from Ipswich, Suffolk to Barton-upon-Humber, Lincolnshire.
Venus	United Kingdom	The ship was lost at Lisbon, Portugal. She was on a voyage from Falmouth, Cornwall to Lisbon.
Vrouw Anna	Heligoland	The ship was driven ashore and wrecked on Düne.
Vrow Johanna	Flag unknown	The ship was driven ashore in the Great Belt, where she was set afire by the Danes.
Walhalla	Prussia	The ship was wrecked on an island off Saaremaa, Russia. She was on a voyage from Memel to Riga, Russia.
Unnamed	United Kingdom	The sloop was driven ashore near Humberston, Lincolnshire. She was on a voyage from Thorne, Yorkshire to Louth, Lincolnshire.
Unnamed	United Kingdom	The ship sank in the River Ouse near Boothferry, Yorkshire.

== November ==
=== 2 November ===
List of shipwrecks: 2 November 1809
Ship	State	Description
Henrick	Flag unknown	The ship was lost near Læsø, Denmark.

=== 3 November ===
List of shipwrecks: 3 November 1809
Ship	State	Description
Countess of Crawford	United Kingdom	The ship foundered in the Atlantic Ocean (44°34′N 47°03′W). Her crew were rescued by Traveller (United Kingdom).
Domkrat (Домкрат, 'Jack')	Imperial Russian Navy	The transport ship was driven ashore near the village of Patala on Bolshoy Beryozovy Island, across the strait from Primorsk. All on board survived. She was on a voyage from Sveaborg, Grand Duchy of Finland to Kronstadt. She broke up on 7 November.
Elizabeth	United Kingdom	The ship foundered whilst on a voyage from Quebec City, Lower Canada, British North America to an Irish port.
Forester	United Kingdom	The sloop was wrecked on the Goodwin Sands, Kent. Her crew were rescued.
Means	United Kingdom	The ship was driven ashore at Milford, Pembrokeshire. She was on a voyage from "Saloe" to Hull, Yorkshire.
Nancy	United Kingdom	The brig was driven ashore at Great Yarmouth, Norfolk. She was later refloated and taken in to Great Yarmouth.
Propitious	United Kingdom	The ship was abandoned in the Atlantic Ocean (41°52′N 41°30′W). She was on a voyage from Quebec City to Hull, Yorkshire.
William and Ann	United Kingdom	The ship foundered in the Atlantic Ocean (44°34′N 47°03′W). Her crew were rescued by Traveller (United Kingdom).

=== 5 November ===
List of shipwrecks: 5 November 1809
Ship	State	Description
Diamond	British East India Company	The East Indiaman was wrecked off "Nobflower Island" with the loss of two lives.
Futteh Allebhoy	British East India Company	The East Indiaman was wrecked off "Nobflower Island".
Lady Mary	United Kingdom	The ship was driven ashore near the Hook Lighthouse, County Wexford. She was on a voyage from Chester, Cheshire to Waterford. She was later refloated and taken in to Passage West, County Cork in a severely damaged state.
Maria Dorothea	United Kingdom	The ship was driven ashore at Orfordness, Suffolk. Her crew were rescued.

=== 6 November ===
List of shipwrecks: 6 November 1809
Ship	State	Description
Jane	United Kingdom	The ship was wrecked in the Firth of Tay. Her crew were rescued. She was on a voyage from Gothenburg, Sweden to Dundee, Forfarshire.

=== 11 November ===
List of shipwrecks: 11 November 1809
Ship	State	Description
Aurora	United Kingdom	The ship foundered whilst on a voyage from Bristol, Gloucestershire to Boston, Massachusetts, United States.
John Adams	United States	The ship was abandoned in the Atlantic Ocean. She was on a voyage from New York to Tenerife.

=== 12 November ===
List of shipwrecks: 12 November 1809
Ship	State	Description
Haddock	United Kingdom	War of the Fifth Coalition: The schooner was captured by Genie (French Navy) and was scuttled.

=== 13 November ===
List of shipwrecks: 13 November 1809
Ship	State	Description
Friends	United Kingdom	The ship was driven ashore and wrecked at Orfordness, Suffolk. She was on a voyage from Great Yarmouth, Norfolk to Hull, Yorkshire.
Nao Pode Sur	Portugal	The ship ran aground on the Scroby Sands, Norfolk. She was on a voyage from Porto to Hull. She was refloated and taken in to Great Yarmouth.

=== 15 November ===
List of shipwrecks: 15 November 1809
Ship	State	Description
Breeze	United Kingdom	The ship ran aground on the Haisborough Sands, in the North Sea. She was refloated but consequently had to be beached at Caister-on-Sea, Norfolk, where she was wrecked. She was on a voyage from Hull, Yorkshire to London.
Lady Tyrconnel	United Kingdom	The ship was run down and sunk in the River Thames by a collier. Her crew were rescued. She was on a voyage from Aberdeen to London.
Minerva	United Kingdom	The ship departed from the Nore for Walcheren, Prussia. No further trace, presumed foundered in the North Sea with the loss of all hands.
Pomona	United Kingdom	The ship was wrecked in the Orkney Islands. She was on a voyage from Liverpool, Lancashire to Gothenburg, Sweden.

=== 16 November ===
List of shipwrecks: 16 November 1809
Ship	State	Description
Albion	United Kingdom	Napoleonic Wars: The transport ship was captured by the French and was subsequently driven ashore near Calais.
Christina	Prussia	The ship was wrecked at Memel.
Favourite	United Kingdom	Napoleonic Wars: The transport ship was driven ashore between Calais and Graveline, Nord, France. She was taken possession of by the French.
Fortune	United Kingdom	War of the Fifth Coalition: The ship was captured in the Atlantic Ocean (48°56′N 16°00′W) by Genie (French Navy) and was scuttled. She was on a voyage from Saint Croix, Virgin Islands to London.
Hazard	United Kingdom	The ship was wrecked in the Vlie. Her crew were rescued. She was on a voyage from London to Heligoland.
Ocean	United Kingdom	Napoleonic Wars: The transport ship was captured by the French. She was subsequently driven ashore near Calais.
Spy	United States	The ship was driven ashore on Texel, North Holland, First French Empire. She was later refloated and take to the Nieuw Diep.
Trafalgar	United Kingdom	Napoleonic Wars: The transport ship was captured by the French. She was subsequently driven ashore near Calais.

=== 17 November ===
List of shipwrecks: 17 November 1809
Ship	State	Description
HMS Chiffone	Royal Navy	Persian Gulf campaign of 1809: The Heureuse-class frigate ran aground at Ras Al Khaimah during an attack on that place. She was refloated.
Die Hoffnung	Heligoland	The ship was driven ashore and wrecked on Heligoland.
Ellen	United Kingdom	The ship was driven ashore and wrecked on Heligoland.
Esther	United Kingdom	The ship ran aground north of Düne. She was refloated with assistance of HMS Amiable (Royal Navy) and taken in to Heligoland.
Five Gebroeders	Heligoland	The ship was driven ashore and wrecked on Heligoland.
Johanna Elizabeth	Heligoland	The ship was driven ashore and wrecked on Heligoland.
Jong Jacob	Heligoland	The ship was driven ashore and wrecked on Heligoland.
Jong Jan	Heligoland	The ship was driven ashore and wrecked on Heligoland.
Jong Pieter	Heligoland	The ship was struck by Seaforth (United Kingdom) and sank at Heligoland.
Metta	Heligoland	The ship was driven ashore and wrecked on Heligoland.
Neptunus	Heligoland	Captain Behrens's ship was driven ashore and wrecked on Heligoland.
Neptunus	Heligoland	Captain Felder's ship was driven ashore and wrecked on Heligoland.
HMS Patriot	Royal Navy	The gun-brig was driven ashore on Düne. She was later refloated and returned to service.
Robareas	United States	The ship was driven ashore and wrecked on Heligoland.
Seaton	United Kingdom	The ship was driven ashore and wrecked near Beaumaris, Anglesey with the loss of three of her crew. She was on a voyage from Cork to Liverpool, Lancashire.
Tweede Bervaght	Heligoland	The ship was in collision with HMS Patriot (Royal Navy). She was then driven ashore and wrecked on Düne.
Vrouw Trentjie	Heligoland	The ship was driven ashore and wrecked on Heligoland.
Zevy Sophia	Heligoland	The ship was driven ashore and wrecked on Heligoland.
Nine unnamed vessels	Emirate of Ras Al Khaimah	Persian Gulf campaign of 1809: The dhows were burnt by HMS Chiffonne (Royal Navy) at Ras Al Khaimah.

=== 18 November ===
List of shipwrecks: 18 November 1809
Ship	State	Description
Edward	United Kingdom	The ship was driven ashore and wrecked at the mouth of the River Tees. Her crew were rescued.
Eliza	United Kingdom	The ship was driven ashore on Heligoland. She was refloated.
Fanny	United Kingdom	The ship foundered in the North Sea off the mouth of the River Tees with the loss of all hands.
Friends	United Kingdom	The ship foundered in the North Sea off the mouth of the River Tees with the loss of all hands.
Friends	United Kingdom	The crewless ship was driven from her anchorage off Lowestoft, Suffolk in a gale. She came ashore at Orfordness, Suffolk and was wrecked.
George	United Kingdom	The ship foundered in the Atlantic Ocean with the loss of a crew member. She was on a voyage from Cork to Jamaica. Six survivors were rescued by Sir Edward Pellew (United Kingdom).
Hunter	United Kingdom	The ship was driven ashore at Bootle, Lancashire. She was on a voyage from Liverpool, Lancashire to Brazil. She was later refloated.
Lord Wellington	United Kingdom	The ship was driven ashore and wrecked near Walmer Castle, Kent. Her crew were rescued. She was on a voyage from Waterford to London.
Margaret and Ann	United Kingdom	The ship was driven ashore and wrecked at Whitby, Yorkshire. Her crew were rescued.
Neptune	United Kingdom	The ship was driven ashore and wrecked at the mouth of the River Tees. Her crew were rescued.
Resolution	United Kingdom	The ship was driven ashore and wrecked at Whitby. Her crew were rescued.

=== 19 November ===
List of shipwrecks: 19 November 1809
Ship	State	Description
Fifth of May	United Kingdom	The ship was driven ashore and wrecked at Great Yarmouth, Norfolk. Her crew were rescued.
Hopewell	United Kingdom	The ship was driven ashore and wrecked at Great Yarmouth. Her crew were rescued.
Nye Prove	Sweden	The ship was driven ashore and wrecked at Great Yarmouth. Her crew were rescued. She was on a voyage from London, United Kingdom to Gothenburg.
Runter	United Kingdom	The ship struck rocks in the isles of Scilly and sank whilst on a voyage from Cork to Truro, Cornwall. Her crew were rescued. She was subsequently refloated.

=== 20 November ===
List of shipwrecks: 20 November 1809
Ship	State	Description
Vaynol	United Kingdom	The ship ran aground on the Sproe Reef whilst on a voyage from Stockholm, Sweden to London. She was set afire and destroyed on the orders of the commodore of the convoy that she formed part of.

=== 21 November ===
List of shipwrecks: 21 November 1809
Ship	State	Description
Aurora	United States	The ship sprang a leak and foundered in the Atlantic Ocean. Her fifteen crew took to a boat. They were rescued the next day by HMS Philomel (Royal Navy).
Fleis	Prussia	The ship was driven ashore at Pillau.
Hibernia	United Kingdom	The ship foundered in the Atlantic Ocean off Port Isaac, Cornwall. She was on a voyage from Padstow, Cornwall to "Port de la Bole".
Jong Pieter	Heligoland	The ship was run into by Seaforth (United Kingdom) and foundered off Heligolan.
Oveida de Pareira	Portugal	The ship departed from Macoa for China. She had not arrived by 14 February 1810, presumed foundered.

=== 22 November ===
List of shipwrecks: 22 November 1809
Ship	State	Description
Anne	United Kingdom	The ship capsized in the Irish Sea off St. Bees, Cumberland. Her crew were rescued. She was on a voyage from Tobermory Isle of Mull to Liverpool, Lancashire.
Saphronia	United Kingdom	The ship departed from Lisbon, Portugal for London. No further trace, presumed foundered with the loss of all hands.

=== 23 November ===
List of shipwrecks: 23 November 1809
Ship	State	Description
Adelheit	Heligoland	The ship was driven ashore and wrecked on Heligoland.
Dolphin	Heligoland	The ship was driven ashore and wrecked on Heligoland.
Dree Gesusters	Heligoland	The ship was driven ashore and wrecked on Heligoland.
Johanna Elizabeth	Heligoland	The ship sank at Heligoland.
Noel Rent	Heligoland	The ship was driven ashore and wrecked on Heligoland.
Nymph	United Kingdom	The ship was wrecked in the Isles of Scilly. She was on a voyage from Newfoundland, British North America to Poole, Dorset.
Six Gebroeders	Heligoland	The ship was driven ashore and wrecked on Heligoland.
Tagus	Portugal	The ship foundered in the Atlantic Ocean. She was on a voyage from Baltimore, Maryland, United States to Lisbon. Her crew survived.
Thomas & Hannah	United Kingdom	The ship was run down and sunk by Princess of Wales (United Kingdom). Her crew were rescued. Thomas & Hannah was on a voyage from Exeter, Devon to London.
Twee Gebroeders	Heligoland	The ship was driven ashore on Heligoland and severely damaged. She was later refloated.
Unnamed	(Netherlands) Kingdom of Holland	The ship, aprize of HMS Pincher (Royal Navy), was driven ashore and wrecked on Heligoland.

=== 24 November ===
List of shipwrecks: 24 November 1809
Ship	State	Description
Jonge Meyboom	Prussia	The ship foundered off Texel, North Holland, First French Empire.

=== 25 November ===
List of shipwrecks: 25 November 1809
Ship	State	Description
Twee Gebroeders	Heligoland	The ship was driven ashore on Heligoland. She was later refloated.

=== 26 November ===
List of shipwrecks: 26 November 1809
Ship	State	Description
Friends	United Kingdom	The ship foundered in the Irish Sea off Dún Laoghaire, County Dublin. Her crew were rescued. She was on a voyage from Belfast, County Antrim to Dublin.
Good Hope	United Kingdom	The ship foundered off Texel, North Holland, First French Empire.
Lion	United Kingdom	The ship capsized at Penzance, Cornwall. She was on a voyage from Penzance to Malta.
Susan	United Kingdom	The ship was discovered crewless off South Foreland, Kent. She was taken in to Ramsgate, Kent.
Three Brothers	United Kingdom	The ship ran aground at the mouth of the River Tees and was severely damaged. She was refloated and towed into Hartlepool, County Durham for repairs.

=== 27 November ===
List of shipwrecks: 27 November 1809
Ship	State	Description
Chance	(United Kingdom of Great Britain and Ireland) British North America	The ship was wrecked whilst on a voyage from Quebec City, Lower Canada to Newfoundland.

=== 30 November ===
List of shipwrecks: 30 November 1809
Ship	State	Description
Bucephalus	United Kingdom	The ship was destroyed by fire at Shadwell, Middlesex. She was on a voyage from Newcastle upon Tyne, Northumberland to London.
Union	United Kingdom	The ship ran aground on the Barber Sand, in the North Sea off the coast of Norfolk. She was on a voyage from Stockholm, Sweden to London. She was refloated.
Unnamed	United Kingdom	The brig was lost off Great Yarmouth, Norfolk.

=== Unknown date ===
List of shipwrecks: Unknown date in November 1809
Ship	State	Description
Archangel Michael	Russia	The ship was wrecked at Arkhangelsk.
Clifton	United Kingdom	Napoleonic Wars: The ship was captured and burnt by Loire and Seine (both French Navy). She was on a voyage from a Scottish port to Grenada.
Elizabeth	Russia	The ship was driven ashore and wrecked between Harwich, Essex and Orfordness, Suffolk, United Kingdom.
Fancy	United Kingdom	The ship departed from the River Thames for Guernsey, Channel Islands. No further trace, presumed foundered with the loss of all hands.
Fanny	United Kingdom	The ship was driven ashore in the Isles of Scilly. She was on a voyage from Málaga, Spain to Dublin. She was refloated and taken in to Milford Haven, Pembrokeshire.
Fortuna	Russia	The ship foundered in the North Sea off South Shields, County Durham, United Kingdom.
Frechling	Flag unknown	The ship was lost at Riga, Russia.
Freden	Sweden	The ship was wrecked on Læsø, Denmark. She was on a voyage from Stockholm to London, United Kingdom.
Freden	Sweden	The ship was wrecked on the coast of Jutland in mid-November. She was on a voyage from London to Gothenburg.
Freehling	Flag unknown	The ship was wrecked at Riga, Russia.
Friendship	United Kingdom	The ship stuck a rock in Strangford Lough and was damaged. She was on a voyage from Quebec City, Lower Canada, British North America to Liverpool, Lancashire.
Grace	United Kingdom	The ship was driven ashore near Liverpool. She was on a voyage from Dundalk, County Louth to Liverpool.
Henrick Benjamin	Flag unknown	The ship was driven ashore on Læsø, Denmark.
Huntress	United States	The ship was abandoned. She was on a voyage from Lisbon, Portugal to Newberry Port, Massachusetts.
James	United Kingdom	Gunboat War: The ship ran aground in the Great Belt whilst on a voyage from Liverpool, Lancashire to Stockholm, Sweden. HMS Alonzo (Royal Navy) set James on fire to prevent the Danes capturing her.
Jane	United Kingdom	The ship struck a rock and sank in the River Suir. She was on a voyage from Waterford to London.
Jane	United Kingdom	The ship was wrecked on the Gunfleet Sand, in the North Sea. She was on a voyage from London to South Shields.
Juffrow Rosina	Flag unknown	The ship was lost near Karlskrona, Sweden.
Langley	United Kingdom	The sloop sank at Herne Bay, Kent.
Louisa Cecilia	United States	Napoleonic Wars: The ship was captured and burnt by Loire and Seine (both French Navy). Louisa Cecilia was on a voyage from New York to a Spanish port.
Marquis of Huntley	United Kingdom	The ship foundered in the Baltic Sea. Her crew were rescued. She was on a voyage from Stockholm, Sweden to Hull, Yorkshire.
Mary	United Kingdom	The ship was driven ashore at Cullercoats, Northumberland. She was on a voyage from Quebec City, Lower Canada, British North America to Newcastle-upon-Tyne, Northumberland.
Mary	United Kingdom	The ship was lost whilst on a voyage from Galway to Waterford. Her crew were rescued.
Minerva	United Kingdom	The ship ran aground on the Hoyle Bank, in Liverpool Bay. She was on a voyage from Boston, Massachusetts, United States to Ireland and Liverpool.
Phœnix	United States	Napoleonic Wars: The ship was captured and burnt by Loire and Seine (both French Navy). Phœnix was on a voyage from New York to Lisbon.
Rainbow	United Kingdom	The ship foundered in the Grand Banks of Newfoundland in early November. Her crew were rescued. She was on a voyage from Liverpool to Penobscot, Maine, United States.
Seaforth	United Kingdom	The ship was wrecked in the Jade Bight.
Swan	United Kingdom	The ship was lost near Formby, Lancashire. She was on a voyage from Lisbon to Liverpool.
Symetrre	United Kingdom	The ship was driven ashore at Beachy Head, Sussex. She was refloated and taken into The Downs, and later in to Portsmouth, Hampshire, where she arrived on 29 November.
Theresa	United Kingdom	The ship was destroyed by fire at a Norwegian port.
No. 20	Denmark	The schooner was discovered crewless off Texel, North Holland, Kingdom of Holland by the cutter King George (United Kingdom).
Unnamed	Hanover	The ship was driven ashore near Copenhagen, Denmark on or about 3 November.

== December ==
=== 1 December ===
List of shipwrecks: 1 December 1809
Ship	State	Description
Johanna Carolina Ger Hurt	Flag unknown	The ship was wrecked near Karlskrona Sweden.
New Jersey	United Kingdom	The ship ran aground on the Cockle Sand, in the North Sea off the coast of Norfolk. She was refloated.

=== 2 December ===
List of shipwrecks: 2 December 1809
Ship	State	Description
Brilliant	United Kingdom	The ship was lost near Cape Frio, Brazil. Her crew were rescued. She was on a voyage from Rio de Janeiro to London.
Cora	United Kingdom	The ship was wrecked on Anholt, Denmark.
Juffrow Fichades	(France) First French Empire	The ship was lost.

=== 3 December ===
List of shipwrecks: 3 December 1809
Ship	State	Description
Elizabeth	United Kingdom	The ship was driven ashore near Workington, Cumberland. She was on a voyage from Chepstow, Monmouthshire to Whitehaven, Cumberland.
Henrietta	Sweden	The ship departed from St. Ubes, Portugal for Stockholm. No further trace, presumed foundered with the loss of all hands.

=== 4 December ===
List of shipwrecks: 4 December 1809
Ship	State	Description
Margaretha	Flag unknown	The ship was wrecked on "Bornriffe".
Tres Hermanas	Spain	The ship departed from Sanlúcar de Barrameda for Liverpool, Lancashire, United Kingdom. No further trace, presumed foundered with the loss of all hands.
Wilgangen	Sweden	The ship ran aground on the Scroby Sands, Norfolk, United Kingdom. She was refloated and taken in to Great Yarmouth, Norfolk.

=== 5 December ===
List of shipwrecks: 5 December 1809
Ship	State	Description
Eliza	United Kingdom	The ship was lost at Tramore, County Waterford with the loss of all but two of her crew. She was on a voyage from Newfoundland, British North America to Waterford.
Margaretha	(France) First French Empire	The ship was wrecked at Bornrif, Ameland, Friesland.
Venus	United Kingdom	The ship was wrecked at Skagen, Denmark. She was on a voyage from Liverpool, Lancashire to Gothenburg, Sweden.
Vrouw Rebecca	Prussia	The ship foundered at sea.>

=== 6 December ===
List of shipwrecks: 6 December 1809
Ship	State	Description
Druid	United Kingdom	The ship ran aground at Cork.
HMS Hussar	Royal Navy	The Lively-class frigate was driven ashore in Tor Bay. She was on a voyage from Plymouth, Devon to Guernsey, Channel Islands.
Jane	United Kingdom	The sloop was lost in Tramore Bay. Her crew were rescued. She was on a voyage from Tralee, County Kerry to Waterford.
Jemima	United Kingdom	The ship collided with Charlotte (United Kingdom) and foundered in the North Sea off Flamborough Head, Yorkshire. Her crew were rescued.
Six Sisters	United States	The ship sank in the Eider.
Unnamed	United States	The ship sank in the Eider.

=== 7 December ===
List of shipwrecks: 7 December 1809
Ship	State	Description
Albion	United Kingdom	The schooner was driven ashore and wrecked at Seaford, Sussex. Her nine crew were rescued. She was on a voyage from Gibraltar to London.
Eunice	United States	The brig was driven ashore and wrecked at Seaford. Her ten crew were rescued. She was on a voyage from New York to Tönning, Hanover.
February	Prussia	The full-rigged ship was driven ashore and wrecked at Seaford with the loss of fourteen of her sixteen crew, She was on a voyage from Gibraltar to London.
Hired armed ship Harlequin	Royal Navy	Due to a navigational error by her captain, the hired armed vessel, a sloop-of-war ran aground in the English Channel off Seaford and was wrecked with the loss of two of the 50 people on board. Harlequin was escorting a convoy of 23 merchant ships, six of which were also wrecked. She was on a voyage from Plymouth, Devon to The Downs.
Juffrow Anna	Sweden	The ship was wrecked at Gothenburg. She was on a voyage from London to Gothenburg.
Mibedacht	Prussia	The full-rigged ship was driven ashore and wrecked at Seaford with the loss of twelve of her thirteen crew. She was on a voyage from Riga, Russia to Memel.
Traveller	United Kingdom	The brigantine was driven ashore and wrecked at Seaford. Her eight crew were rescued. She was on a voyage from Málaga, Spain to London.
Weymouth	United Kingdom	The full-rigged ship was driven ashore and wrecked at Seaford with the loss of four of her eleven crew. She was on a voyage from Plymouth to London.

=== 8 December ===
List of shipwrecks: 8 December 1809
Ship	State	Description
Jemima	United Kingdom	The ship was wrecked on the Hoyle Bank, in Liverpool Bay, with the loss of all but four of the forty-plus people on board. She was on a voyage from Liverpool, Lancashire to Newry, County Down.

=== 9 December ===
List of shipwrecks: 9 December 1809
Ship	State	Description
Victorina	United Kingdom	The ship ran aground at New Providence, New Jersey, United States. She was on a voyage from Liverpool, Lancashire to New Providence.

=== 10 December ===
List of shipwrecks: 10 December 1809
Ship	State	Description
Christian and Margaret	United Kingdom	The ship was lost at Saltcoats, Ayrshire. she was on a voyage from Liverpool, Lancashire to Leith, Lothian.
Santa Margaretta	Spain	The ship ran aground on the Brake Sand, in the North Sea. She was on a voyage from London, United Kingdom to Cádiz. She was refloated and taken in to Ramsgate, Kent, United Kingdom.

=== 11 December ===
List of shipwrecks: 11 December 1809
Ship	State	Description
John	United Kingdom	The ship was driven out to sea from Heligoland. No further trace, presumed foundered with the loss of all hands.
Juno	Flag unknown	The ship was lost near Gothenburg, Sweden with the loss of seven of her crew.
Newark Castle	United Kingdom	The ship foundered in the North Sea. Her crew were rescued. She was on a voyage from South Shields, County Durham to Aberdeen.
Nordstern	Flag unknown	The ship was lost near Åbo, Grand Duchy of Finland.
President	United Kingdom	The victualling ship was wrecked near "Wingo".

=== 12 December ===
List of shipwrecks: 12 December 1809
Ship	State	Description
Ann	United Kingdom	The ship was wrecked near South Shields, County Durham.
Atlas	United Kingdom	The ship was wrecked near South Shields.
Charles	Russia	The ship, a prize, was driven ashore at Great Yarmouth, Norfolk, United Kingdom.
Coffee Planter	United Kingdom	The ship was driven onto the East Tong Sand, in the Thames Estuary. She was later refloated and taken in to Margate, Kent.
Dogter Margaretta	Heligoland	The ship was wrecked on the North Reef, off Heligoland. She was on a voyage from London to Heligoland.
Einigheit	Heligoland	The ship was wrecked on the North Reef, off Heligoland. She was on a voyage from London to Heligoland.
Ellen	Heligoland	The ship was wrecked on the North Reef, off Heligoland. She was on a voyage from London to Heligoland.
Familien	(Denmark) Norway	The ship was lost on the Norwegian coast.
Frau Getin	Heligoland	The ship foundered off Heligoland.
George	United Kingdom	The ship was driven ashore on the Spitsand. She was later refloated and taken in to Portsmouth, Hampshire.
George	United Kingdom	The ship was wrecked on the North Reef, off Heligoland. She was on a voyage from Bristol, Gloucestershire to Heligoland.
Gustavus	United Kingdom	The ship was wrecked at Vlissingen, Zeeland, First French Empire with the loss of all hands. She was on a voyage from Vlissingen to London.
Hero	United Kingdom	The West Indiaman was driven ashore near Sandwich, Kent. She was refloated and taken in to Ramsgate, Kent.
Hoffnung	United Kingdom Heligoland	The ship was driven ashore and wreecked on Heligoland.
Jacob & Robert	Heligoland	The ship sank at Heligoland. She was on a voyage from London to Heligoland.
Jubilee	United Kingdom	The ship sank at Ramsgate, Kent. She was on a voyage from London to Guernsey, Channel Islands.
Leda	United Kingdom	The polacca sank at Ramsgate. She was on a voyage from London to Gibraltar. Leda was subsequently wrecked on 15 December.
Leonidas	United Kingdom	The ship was driven ashore at Great Yarmouth.
Melcomb	United Kingdom	The ship foundered in the North Sea off Great Yarmouth.
Middlesex	United Kingdom	The ship was wrecked on the North Reef, off Heligoland. She was on a voyage from New York, United States to Heligoland.
Nancy	United Kingdom	Napoleonic Wars: The ship was capturned and sunk by four French frigates. She was on a voyage from the Clyde to Grenada.
Noodgedacht	Heligoland	The ship was driven ashore and wrecked on Heligoland.
Norwich	United Kingdom	The ship was driven ashore at Great Yarmouth.
Olive Branch	United Kingdom	The ship was driven onto the Brake Sand, in the North Sea. She was refloated but was abandoned by her crew and subsequently foundered. Olive Branch was on a voyage from London to Jamaica.
Pursuit	United Kingdom	The ship was driven ashore near Spithead, Hampshire. She was later refloated.
Recovery	United Kingdom	The ship was driven ashore on the Spitsand. She was later refloated and taken in toe Portsmouth.
Sally	United Kingdom	The ship was driven ashore and capsized at Ramsgate with the loss of all but three of those on board. She later floated out to sea on her side. Sally was on a voyage from London to Madeira.
Three Friends	United Kingdom	The ship was driven ashore on Düne, Heligoland.
Triton	United Kingdom	The ship was driven ashore near "Oldhaven".
Union	United Kingdom	The ship was driven ashore at Great Yarmouth.
Unnamed	Flag unknown	The ship sank off Broadstairs, Kent.
Seven unnamed vessels	Flags unknown	The ships were driven ashore in Lymington Creek. They were refloated.
Unnamed	Flag unknown	The ship foundered off Great Yarmouth with the loss of all hands.
Unnamed	Flag unknown	The galiot collided with General Palafox (United Kingdom) and sank at Heligoland.

=== 14 December ===
List of shipwrecks: 14 December 1809
Ship	State	Description
Catherine	United Kingdom	The ship foundered in the North Sea off Lowestoft, Suffolk with the loss of all but one of her crew.
HMS Defender	Royal Navy	The Archer-class gun-brig was driven ashore and wrecked near Folkestone, Kent.
HMS Junon	Royal Navy	Napoleonic Wars: The Gloire-class frigate was set afire and scuttled off Guadeloupe by the French. The ships of the line Clorinde and Loire, frigate Renommée, and vessel Seine (all French Navy) had captured her off Guadeloupe on 13 December with the loss of 15 of her crew.
Union	United Kingdom	The ship was driven ashore near Southwold, Suffolk. She was on a voyage from Sunderland, County Durham to Weymouth, Dorset.

=== 15 December ===
List of shipwrecks: 15 December 1809
Ship	State	Description
Adelaide	France	The brig was driven ashore at Ramsgate, Kent, United Kingdom.
Ann	United Kingdom	The ship was wrecked on the Black Middens, in the North Sea off the coast of County Durham. She was on a voyage from London to South Shields, County Durham.
Ann	United Kingdom	The ship was driven ashore in Pegwell Bay, Kent.
Ansang	Flag unknown	The ship was driven ashore at Ramsgate. She was on a voyage from a Baltic port to Plymouth, Devon, United Kingdom.
Aurora	United Kingdom	The brigantine was driven ashore and wrecked between Newhaven and Seaford, Sussex with the loss of three of her five crew. She was on a voyage from Southampton, Hampshire to Bridlington, Yorkshire.
Camilla	United Kingdom	The ship was driven ashore near Great Yarmouth, Norfolk. She was on a voyage from Sunderland, County Durham to London.
Catherine	United Kingdom	The ship ran aground and capsized on the Home Sand, in the North Sea off Lowestoft, Suffolk with the loss of all but one of her crew. She was on a voyage from Sunderland to Chatham, Kent.
Clarendon	United Kingdom	The ship was driven ashore near Portsmouth. She was later refloated and taken in to Portsmouth.
Cognac	United Kingdom	The ship foundered in Tor Bay. Her crew were rescued. She was on a voyage from Prince Edward Island, British North America to Teignmouth, Devon.
Concordia	France	The ship was wrecked on the Goodwin Sands, Kent with loss of life.
Corn Planter	United Kingdom	The ship was driven ashore and wrecked near Sandown Castle, Kent. She was on a voyage from London to Philadelphia, Pennsylvania, United States.
Countess of Cardigan	United Kingdom	The ship was driven ashore at Johnshaven, Aberdeenshire. Her crew were rescued.
Defiance	United Kingdom	The trow foundered near the mouth of the River Wye. Her crew survived. She was refloated.
Fame	United Kingdom	The ship was driven ashore at Great Yarmouth. She was on a voyage from Newcastle upon Tyne to London. Fame was later refloated and taken in to Great Yarmouth.
Flaxley	United Kingdom	The ship was driven ashore near Ramsgate. She was on a voyage from London to Falmouth, Cornwall. Flaxley was later refloated and taken in to Broadstairs, Kent.
Fortune	United Kingdom	The ship was driven ashore at Aberdeen. She was on a voyage from Aberdeen to Sunderland, County Durham.
George	United Kingdom	The collier was driven ashore off Sandwich, Kent.
George	United Kingdom	The ship was driven ashore and wrecked near Redcar, Yorkshire.
Harvey	United Kingdom	The ship was driven ashore at Ramsgate, Kent. She was on a voyage from London to Trinidad. Harvey was refloated on 16 December and taken in to Ramsgate.
Hawke	United Kingdom	The ship was driven ashore at Aberdeen. She was on a voyage from South Shields, County Durham to Aberdeen.
Jane	United Kingdom	The ship was driven ashore at Aberdeen. She was on a voyage from London to Glasgow, Renfrewshire.
Kingston	United Kingdom	The ship was driven ashore on the Sandwich Flats. She was on a voyage from London to Jamaica. Kingston was later refloated and taken in to Ramsgate.
Lady Ann	United Kingdom	The ship foundered was driven ashore near Ramsgate. She was on a voyage from London to Grenada. Lady Ann was later refloated and taken in to Ramsgate.
Liberty	United Kingdom	The ship foundered in the North Sea off the mouth of the Humber. Her crew were rescued.
Mary	United Kingdom	The ship was driven ashore at Great Yarmouth. She was on a voyage from Hull, East Riding of Yorkshire to London.
Melburn	United Kingdom	The ship was driven ashore at Great Yarmouth. She was on a voyage from Quebec City, Lower Canada, British North America to London. Melburn was refloated in January 1810 and taken in to Great Yarmouth.
Nancy	United Kingdom	The ship was driven ashore at Great Yarmouth.
Peacock	United Kingdom	The barge foundered near the mouth of the River Wye. Her crew survived.
Providence	United Kingdom	The sloop was driven ashore near Stonehaven, Aberdeenshire. Her crew were rescued She was on a voyage from Aberdeen to Montrose, Forfarshire.
Royalist	United Kingdom	The transport ship was driven on to the Spitsand. She was later refloated and beached at Southsea, Hampshire. Subsequently refloated and taken in to Portsmouth, Hampshire.
Speculation	United Kingdom	The ship was driven ashore on the Hoyle Bank, in Liverpool Bay. She was on a voyage from Liverpool to Trinidad. Speculation was later refloated.
Success	United Kingdom	The ship was driven ashore at Great Yarmouth.
Success	United Kingdom	The trow foundered near the mouth of the River Wye. Her crew survived. She was refloated.
Susan	United Kingdom	The ship was driven ashore and wrecked 4 nautical miles (7.4 km) south of Montrose, Forfarshire. Her crew were rescued.
Union	United Kingdom	The ship was driven ashore at Great Yarmouth. She was on a voyage from Gainsborough, Lincolnshire to London. Union was later refloated and taken in to Great Yarmouth for repairs.
Westmoreland	United Kingdom	The ship was driven ashore at Great Yarmouth. She was on a voyage from Stockton on Tees, Yorkshire to London.
Unnamed	Flag unknown	An unidentified ship in ballast and of between 300 and 400 tons became a total loss on the Goodwin Sands in the English Channel.

=== 16 December ===
List of shipwrecks: 16 December 1809
Ship	State	Description
Mary	United Kingdom	The ship struck an anchor and sank at Milford Haven, Pembrokeshire. She was on a voyage from Liverpool, Lancashire to Demerara.
Mary	United Kingdom	The ship was driven ashore and wrecked at Port Maria, Jamaica. She was on a voyage from Jamaica to London.

=== 17 December ===
List of shipwrecks: 17 December 1809
Ship	State	Description
Perseverance	United Kingdom	The ship was wrecked on the Rock of Pai. She was on a voyage from Gibraltar to Rio de Janeiro.

=== 18 December ===
List of shipwrecks: 18 December 1809
Ship	State	Description
John	United Kingdom	The ship was run ashore at Hoylake, Lancashire. She was on a voyage from Jamaica to Liverpool, Lancashire. She was refloated.
Marquis of Lorn	United Kingdom	The sloop foundered in the Irish Sea off Holyhead, Anglesey with the loss of all on board.
Mary	United Kingdom	The ship was driven ashore and wrecked at Port Maria, Jamaica.
Syren	United Kingdom	The ship was destroyed by fire on the coast of Africa. Her crew were rescued.
Thomas and Mary	United Kingdom	The ship was driven ashore and damaged at Garmouth, Aberdeenshire. She was on a voyage from Gothenburg, Sweden to London.

=== 21 December ===
List of shipwrecks: 21 December 1809
Ship	State	Description
Lucy	United Kingdom	The ship was driven ashore on the Isle of Mull. She was on a voyage from Miramichi, New Brunswick, British North America to Ayr.

=== 22 December ===
List of shipwrecks: 22 December 1809
Ship	State	Description
Caroline	United Kingdom	The ship was driven ashore and severely damaged near Boston, Massachusetts. She was on a voyage from Liverpool, Lancashire to Boston. Caroline was later refloated.
Northern Friends	United Kingdom	The ship was abandoned in the Atlantic Ocean. Her crew were rescued by the privateer Gascon (France). Northern Friends was on a voyage from Quebec City, Lower Canada, British North America to Chatham, Kent.

=== 23 December ===
List of shipwrecks: 25 December 1809
Ship	State	Description
Partridge	United Kingdom	The ship was wrecked on the Owers Sandbank, in the English Channel. Her crew were rescued. She was on a voyage from Plymouth, Devon to Brighton, Sussex.
HMS Salorman	Royal Navy	The cutter ran aground east of Ystad, Sweden, and was abandoned by her crew. She was a total loss.
Thames	United Kingdom	The ship departed from Salcombe, Devon for São Miguel Island, Azores. No further trace, presumed foundered with the loss of all hands.

=== 24 December ===
List of shipwrecks: 24 December 1809
Ship	State	Description
Carolina	Sweden	The ship was wrecked on the coast of Norway with the loss of all but one of her crew. She was on a voyage from London, United Kingdom to Gothenburg.

=== 25 December ===
List of shipwrecks: 25 December 1809
Ship	State	Description
Mary	(United Kingdom of Great Britain and Ireland) Malta	The ship was lost at Malta. She was on a voyage from Messina, Kingdom of Sicily to Malta.
Minerva	Flag unknown	The ship was lost at "Giorsber".
Vrouw Christina	Prussia	The ship was wrecked on the coast of Jutland with the loss of her captain.

=== 28 December ===
List of shipwrecks: 28 December 1809
Ship	State	Description
John	United Kingdom	Napoleonic Wars: The ship was captured and burnt in the Atlantic Ocean (48°47′N 9°15′W) by the privateer Confiance (France). She was on a voyage from London to São Miguel Island, Azores.
Pek	(France) First French Empire	The ship was driven ashore at Egmond aan Zee.
Vriendschaap	(France) First French Empire	The ship was driven ashore at Egmond aan Zee.

=== 29 December ===
List of shipwrecks: 29 December 1809
Ship	State	Description
Active	United Kingdom	The ship departed from Messina, Kingdom of Sicily for a British port. Supposed subsequently wrecked on the coast of Calabria with the loss of all hands.

=== Unknown date ===
List of shipwrecks: Unknown date in December 1809
Ship	State	Description
Addington	United Kingdom	The ship was driven ashore at Alnwick, Northumberland. She was on a voyage from Malta to Leith, Lothian.
Ann	United Kingdom	The ship foundered off Campbeltown, Argyllshire. She was on a voyage from Sligo to Liverpool, Lancashire.
Anna Catharina Sophia	Sweden	The ship foundered off Gothenburg. Her crew were rescued.
Aurora	Sweden	The ship was wrecked near Gothenburg. She was on a voyage from Alicante, Spain to Gothenburg.
Barbara and Mary	United Kingdom	The ship ran aground at Wexford. She was on a voyage from Liverpool to Londonderry.
Boyd	United Kingdom	Boyd Boyd massacre: The brigantine was destroyed by fire and explosion at Whangaroa, New Zealand.
Cecilia	United Kingdom	The transport ship was lost at Vlissingen.
Charles	Russia	The ship was driven ashore at Great Yarmouth, Norfolk, United Kingdom.
Connecticut	United States	The ship was wrecked on Saint Tudwal's Islands, Caernarfonshire, United Kingdom. Her crew were rescued. She was on a voyage from New York to Liverpool, Lancashire, United Kingdom.
Diana	United Kingdom	She was driven ashore near Killybegs, County Donegal. She was on a voyage from Liverpool to Barbados.
Dorothea	United Kingdom	The ship was lost in the Baltic Sea.
Eliza	United Kingdom	The ship was driven ashore in the Outer Hebrides and severely damaged. She was on a voyage from Dublin to a Swedish port.
Eliza	(United Kingdom of Great Britain and Ireland) Jamaica	War of the Fifth Coalition: The schooner was captured by the privateer Superieure (France) and was scuttled.
Emelia	United Kingdom	The ship foundered off Riga, Russia.
Fancy	United Kingdom	The cutter was wrecked at São Miguel, Azores.
Fanny	United Kingdom	War of the Fifth Coalition: The brig was captured by the privateer Superieure (France) and was scuttled.
Fortuna	United Kingdom	The ship was driven ashore in the Isles of Scilly. She was on a voyage from Menorca, Spain to London.
Fortuna	United Kingdom	The ship was lost at Vlissingen.
Friends	United Kingdom	The ship foundered off Karlskrona, Sweden. She was on a voyage from Stockholm to London.
Friends	United Kingdom	The ship was wrecked at Barnstaple, Devon.
General Palafox	United Kingdom	The ship was driven ashore on Heligoland. She was later refloated with assistance from HMS Richmond (Royal Navy).
Hagenadelsten	(Denmark) Norway	The ship was wrecked on the Isle of Lewis, United Kingdom.
Isabella	United Kingdom	The ship ran aground on the Home Sand, in the North Sea. She was on a voyage from Newcastle upon Tyne, Northumberland to London. Isabella was later refloated and taken in to Great Yarmouth for repairs.
James	France	The ship was driven ashore at Carlsham, Sweden. She was on a voyage from Bordeaux, Gironde to a Baltic port.
Jane	United Kingdom	The whaler, a full-rigged ship, was wrecked in the River Tay.
Jason	United Kingdom	The transport ship was wrecked at Vlissingen, Zeeland, First French Empire.
John	United Kingdom	The ship was driven ashore at Wexford. She was refloated on 26 December.
John	United Kingdom	The ship was wrecked on Island Glass Orkney Islands. She was on a voyage from Liverpool to Gothenburg.
Lambertina	Flag unknown	The ship foundered off Gothenburg.
Lavinia	United States	The ship was driven ashore and wrecked at Lytham St. Annes, Lancashire. She was on a voyage from New Jersey to Liverpool.
Leonidas	United Kingdom	The ship was driven ashore at Great Yarmouth.
Lord Nelson	United Kingdom	War of the Fifth Coalition: The ship was captured by the privateer Superieure (France) and was scuttled.
Marquis of Huntley	United Kingdom	The ship foundered in the Kattegat off Anholt, Denmark. She was on a voyage from Gävle, Sweden to Hull, Yorkshire.
Mary	United Kingdom	War of the Fifth Coalition: The brig was captured by the privateer Superieure (France) and was scuttled.
Mercator	United Kingdom	The ship was wrecked near Ystad, Sweden. She was on a voyage from Stockholm to Hull.
Minerva	United States	The ship foundered in the Irish Sea off Douglas, Isle of Man with the loss of all but two of her crew.
Nancy	United Kingdom	The ship foundered in the Bay of Nigg.
Navigation	Prussia	The ship foundered in the Baltic Sea.
Nelly	United Kingdom	The sloop was driven ashore and wrecked at Forvie, Aberdeenshire. Her crew were rescued. She was on a voyage from Dundee, Forfarshire to Aberdeen.
Nordstern	Flag unknown	The ship was lost in the Great Belt.
Norwich	United Kingdom	The ship was driven ashore at Great Yarmouth.
Numa	United States	The ship foundered in the Atlantic Ocean whilst on a voyage from New York to Liverpool. Her crew survived.
Olive Brace	United Kingdom	The ship ran aground on the Goodwin Sands, Kent. She was refloated.
Oriental	United States	The ship was wrecked at Heligoland.
Phemie	United Kingdom	The ship was wrecked in Cardigan Bay. She was on a voyage from Cork to Liverpool.
Providence	United Kingdom	The ship was lost whilst on a voyage from Jamaica to St. Andero. Spain.
Rising Sun	United Kingdom	The ship was driven ashore and wrecked at Skagen, Denmark. Four of her crew survived. She was on a voyage from Liverpool to Gothenburg, Sweden.
Samaritan's Hope	United Kingdom	The ship was driven ashore at Hoylake, Lancashire. She was on a voyage from Liverpool to Faial, Azores.
Samuel	United Kingdom	The ship was wrecked at Figueria, Portugal. She was on a voyage from Faro to London.
Sophia Carolina Albertina	Russia	The ship foundered in the Great Belt.
Speculation	Sweden	The ship was driven ashore at Nyköping. She was on a voyage from Stockholm to Plymouth.
Speculation	Sweden	The ship was lost whilst on a voyage from London to Gothenburg.
Sulterton	United Kingdom	The ship was driven ashore in the Isles of Scilly.
Susan	United Kingdom	The transport ship was lost at Vlissingen.
Thomas	United Kingdom	The ship foundered in Red Wharf Bay with the loss of all on board. She was on a voyage from Curaçao to Liverpool.
Union	United Kingdom	The ship was driven ashore near Southwold, Suffolk. She was on a voyage from Sunderland, County Durham to Weymouth, Dorset.
Union	United Kingdom	The ship was driven ashore at Great Yarmouth. She was later refloated.
Vrouw Anna	Duchy of Mecklenburg-Schwerin	War of the Fifth Coalition: The ship was captured in the Baltic Sea by a French privateer and was run ashore at Rostock. She was on a voyage from Carlsham, Sweden to Wismar.
Vrow Elida	Flag unknown	The ship was driven ashore and wrecked on Eierland, North Holland, First French Empire.
Vyf Gebroeders	(Netherlands) Kingdom of Holland	The ship was wrecked on the Dutch coast.
Wansbeck	United Kingdom	The ship was lost at Vlissingen.

== Unknown date ==
List of shipwrecks: Unknown date in 1809
Ship	State	Description
Active	United Kingdom	The ship was driven ashore in the Saint Lawrence River near Bic, Lower Canada, British North America. She was on a voyage from Quebec City, Lower Canada to Greenock, Renfrewshire.
Alliance	United Kingdom	The schooner collided with HMS Statira (Royal Navy) and sank. Her crew were rescued. She was on a voyage from Liverpool, Lancashire to Philadelphia, Pennsylvania, United States.
Animo Grande	Portugal	The ship foundered in the Atlantic Ocean off Pará, Brazil. She was on a voyage from Lisbon to Pará.
Ann	United Kingdom	The ship foundered in the Atlantic Ocean whilst on a voyage from Liverpool to Newfoundland, British North America. Her crew were rescued by Henrietta (United Kingdom).
Ann	United Kingdom	The ship was lost in the Gulf of St. Lawrence. She was on a voyage from Quebec City to London.
Arran	United Kingdom	The ship was lost in the Persian Gulf. She was on a voyage from Bengal, India to Bussorah, Ottoman Iraq.
Benjamin and Elizabeth	United Kingdom	The ship ran aground in Delaware Bay. She was on a voyage from Liverpool to Philadelphia, Pennsylvania.
British King	United Kingdom	The ship was lost at British Honduras.
Carleton	United Kingdom	The ship foundered in the Grand Banks of Newfoundland. She was on a voyage from Hull, Yorkshire to Quebec City.
Caroline	French Navy	War of the Fifth Coalition: The Hortense-class frigate was run ashore on Île Bourbon by a Royal Navy squadron.
Carr	United Kingdom	The ship foundered. At least six crew were rescued. She was on a voyage from Curaçao to London.
Castle	United Kingdom	War of the Fifth Coalition: The ship was run ashore and wrecked at Saint-Marc, Hispaniola in an engagement with a French privateer. Her crew were rescued.
Commerce	United Kingdom	The ship was destroyed by fire at Pernambuco, Brazil.
Correio da Madeira	Portugal	War of the Fifth Coalition: The ship was captured and sunk by a French Navy frigate. She was on a voyage from Bahía, Brazil to a European port.
Cyrus	United Kingdom	The ship was wrecked on Cape Corrientes, Cuba. She was on a voyage from Jamaica to Halifax, Nova Scotia, British North America.
Dick	United Kingdom	The ship was lost on the coast of Africa. Part of the cargo and some of the materials were saved.
Dragon	United Kingdom	The ship was wrecked on the coast of Florida, New Spain. She was on a voyage from Haiti to Barbados and Liverpool.
Duke of Kent	United Kingdom	The ship was lost in the Bay of Fundy. Her crew were rescued. She was on a voyage from Plymouth, Devon to New Brunswick, British North America.
Eclipse	United States	The schooner, constructed by survivors of the ship Eclipse (United States) – which had sunk in off Sanak Island in the Catherine Archipelago in Russian America in September 1807 – using materials from that ship, was wrecked on Unalaska Island in the Catherine Archipelago with a loss of life that included four people who had survived the 1807 wreck. There were 11 survivors of the 1809 wreck.
Endeavour	United Kingdom	The ship struck a rock off Pará, Brazil and was damaged. She was on a voyage from Liverpool to Brazil. Endeavour was consequently declared a total loss.
Ersahung	Russia	The ship was lost near the mouth of the "River Penoy" with the loss of three of her crew.
Euphemia	United Kingdom	The ship was driven ashore on St Simons Island, Georgia, United States. She was on a voyage from Virginia, United States to Amelia Island, Florida, New Spain. Euphemia was later refloated.
Europe	British East India Company	War of the Fifth Coalition: The East Indiaman was captured by Caroline (French Navy). She was run ashore on Île Bourbon.
Experiment	British East India Company	The East Indiaman was reported missing, presumed lost.
Ferdinand 7th	United Kingdom	The whaler was lost in the River Plate.
Fanny	United Kingdom	The ship was lost in the River Plata. Her crew were rescued. She was on a voyage from the River Plata to London.
Fanny	United Kingdom	The ship was lost off Cuba. Her crew were rescued. She was on a voyage from Jamaica to New York.
Farmer	United Kingdom	The ship was wrecked on Barbuda. Her crew were rescued. She was on a voyage from Newcastle upon Tyne, Northumberland to British Honduras.
Friends	United Kingdom	The ship was lost near Antigua. She was on a voyage from the Clyde to Saint Thomas, Virgin Islands.
Galgo	Spain-1785	The ship was lost near Montevideo, Viceroyalty of the Río de la Plata. She was on a voyage from Cádiz to the River Plate.
General Beresford	United Kingdom	The ship foundered in the Gulf of Florida. She was on a voyage from British Honduras to Bristol, Gloucestershire.
Glory	British East India Company	The East Indiaman foundered in the Indian Ocean.
Good Hope	United Kingdom	The ship was lost near Anegada, Virgin Islands. She was on a voyage from London to the Spanish Main.
Hannibal	United Kingdom	The ship was lost at Grenada. Her crew were rescued. She was on a voyage from Grenada to London.
Hetty	United Kingdom	The ship was driven ashore on Amelia Island. She was on a voyage from Amelia Island to Liverpool.
Indefatigable	United Kingdom	The ship was wrecked on the coast of Newfoundland.
Isabella	United Kingdom	The ship foundered in the Grand Banks of Newfoundland. She was on a voyage from Liverpool to Quebec City.
Jane	United Kingdom	The ship capsized in the Atlantic Ocean. Her crew were rescued by Montevideo (United Kingdom). Jane was on a voyage from Quebec City to South Shields, County Durham.
Jenny	United Kingdom	War of the Fifth Coalition: The ship was captured whilst on a voyage from Poole, Dorset to Newfoundland. She was set afire and sunk.
Joseph	Flag unknown	The full-rigged ship was lost in the vicinity of "Squan Beach", a term used at the time for the coast of New Jersey near Manasquan and sometimes for the 7-mile (11 km) stretch of coast between Manasquan Inlet and Cranberry Inlet or for the entire coast of New Jersey between Sea Girt and Barnegat Inlet.
Julia	Spain	The snow was wrecked on Barbuda. She was on a voyage from Cádiz to Barbuda.
Juno	United Kingdom	The ship foundered whilst on a voyage from Gibraltar to Boston, Massachusetts, United States.
Lady St. John	United Kingdom	The ship was lost in the Bay of Fundy. Her crew were rescued. She was on a voyage from Liverpool to New Brunswick.
Lancashire Witch	United Kingdom	The ship was lost off Saint Lucia. Her crew were rescued. she was on a voyage from Liverpool to Barbados.
Lilly of the Valley	United Kingdom	The ship was lost on Prince Edward Island, British North America. Her crew were rescued. She was on a voyage from Liverpool to Quebec City.
Lively	United Kingdom	The ship was wrecked in the Magdalen Islands, Lower Canada. She was on a voyage from Liverpool to Quebec City.
Lord Nelson	British East India Company	The East Indiaman was reported missing, supposed lost.
Lovely Ann	United States	The ship foundered. She was on a voyage from Baltimore, Maryland to Lisbon.
Mary	United Kingdom	War of the Fifth Coalition: The ship was captured by a French privateer. She was recaptured by HMS Solebay (Royal Navy) but was subsequently wrecked at Senegal. Mary was on a voyage from Africa to Madeira.
Mary	United States	The ship was lost in the Caicos Islands. She was on a voyage from Cap François, Haiti to Philadelphia.
Minerva	United Kingdom	The brig was abandoned in the Atlantic Ocean (41°51′N 13°12′W). Her crew were rescued by Dispatch (United Kingdom).
Navigation	United Kingdom	The ship was driven ashore and severely damaged at Cora Grande, Maranhão, Brazil.
Nelson	United States	The ship was wrecked on the coast of the United States. She was on a voyage from New York to Amelia Island.
Ocean	United Kingdom	The ship was wrecked in the Saint Lawrence River.
Pandour	United Kingdom	The whaler was lost in the River Plate.
Patriot	United Kingdom	The ship was driven ashore near St. John's, Newfoundland. She was on a voyage from Newfoundland to Liverpool.
Patty	United Kingdom	The ship was driven ashore on the Isle of Skye. She was on a voyage from Liverpool to Virginia, United States. Patty was refloated some time later and taken in to Greenock, where she arrived on 21 November.
Penelope	United Kingdom	The ship was lost near Curaçao. She was on a voyage from London to Curaçao.
Phœnix	United Kingdom	The ship was wrecked at Jamaica.
Queen	United Kingdom	The ship was wrecked at Aux Cayes, Haiti. She was on a voyage from Haiti to London.
Reliance	United Kingdom	The ship was abandoned in the Grand Banks of Newfoundland. she was on a voyage from Quebec City to London. She was discovered at sea (41°40′N 15°20′W) on 26 June by HMS Virago (Royal Navy) and was towed in to Plymouth, Devon.
Robert	United Kingdom	The ship was lost at Liscomb, Nova Scotia. She was on a voyage from Liverpool to Halifax.
Rose	United Kingdom	The ship foundered in the Atlantic Ocean. Her crew were rescued by HMS Squirrel (Royal Navy). Rose was on a voyage from Quebec City to Newry, County Down.
Samson	United Kingdom	The ship was driven ashore on Crane Island, in the Saint Lawrence River. She was on a voyage from Quebec City to London.
Sarah	United States	The ship was wrecked off Anglesey, United Kingdom.
Sarah	United Kingdom	The ship was driven ashore in the Saint Lawrence River. She was on a voyage from Quebec City to Liverpool.
Skelton Castle	British East India Company	The East Indiaman was lost in Indian waters.
St. John Rey de Mar	Portugal	The ship was lost near Pará. She was on a voyage from Maranhão to Cayenne.
Streatham	British East India Company	War of the Fifth Coalition: The East Indiaman was captured by Caroline (French Navy). She was run ashore on Île Bourbon.
Susannah	United Kingdom	The ship capsized in the Atlantic Ocean. Four survivors were rescued by Integrity (United Kingdom). Susannah was on a voyage from Quebec City to London.
Swinger	United Kingdom	The ship was run down and sunk by Margaret (United Kingdom) with the loss of all but two of her crew. She was on a voyage from London to Cork and Saint Thomas, Virgin Islands.
Tartaruga	United Kingdom	The ship was wrecked on a reef 12 leagues (36 nautical miles (67 km)) off the Isle of Pines, Cuba. She was on a voyage from Bahia, Brazil to Havana, Cuba.
Travers	British East India Company	The East Indiaman was lost in Indian waters.
True Briton	British East India Company	The East Indiaman foundered whilst on a voyage from Bombay, India to Canton, China. She parted company in the South China Sea on 19 October 1809 and not heard of again.
Urania	United Kingdom	The ship was lost whilst on a voyage from Quebec City to South Shields. Her crew were rescued by Providence's Success (United Kingdom).
Unicorn	United Kingdom	War of the Fifth Coalition: The brig was captured 3 nautical miles (5.6 km) off Barbados by a privateer. She was on a voyage from Halifax to the West Indies. Unicorn was subsequently driven ashore on Saba and wrecked.
York	United Kingdom	The brig was lost at the mouth of the River Plate with the loss of all but two of her crew.
Young John	United Kingdom	The ship foundered in the Atlantic Ocean whilst on a voyage from Quebec City to the United Kingdom.
Unnamed	Royal Navy	War of the Fifth Coalition, Walcheren Campaign: The pinnace was sunk between Vlissingen and Cadzand, Zeeland, Kingdom of Holland.
Several unnamed vessels	Royal Navy	War of the Fifth Coalition, Walcheren Campaign: The bomb vessels were lost in an attack on Vlissingen.
Two unnamed vessels	Navy of the Kingdom of Holland	War of the Fifth Coalition, Walcheren Campaign: The ships of the line were abandoned. One was lost off Zierikzee, Zeeland.
