= List of ship launches in 1801 =

The list of ship launches in 1801 includes a chronological list of some ships launched in 1801.

Date	Ship	Class	Builder	Location	Country	Notes
15 January	Lucy Maria	Merchantman	J. Gilmore	Calcutta	India	For Walter Dawes.
15 January	Charlotte	Brig	Moore	Plymouth	United Kingdom	For Mr. Pedder.
28 February	Aeolus	Amphion-class frigate	Frances Barnard	Deptford	United Kingdom	For Royal Navy.
29 March	Scipion	Téméraire-class ship of the line		Lorient	France	For French Navy.
1 April	Aggressor	Archer-class gun-brig	John & William Wells	Blackwall	United Kingdom	For Royal Navy.
1 April	Escort	Gun-brig	John Perry	Blackwall	United Kingdom	For Royal Navy.
1 April	Jackal	Bloodhound-class gun-brig	Perry, Wells & Green	Blackwall	United Kingdom	For Royal Navy.
2 April	Archer	Gun-brig	John & William Wells	Blackwall	United Kingdom	For Royal Navy.
2 April	Basilisk	Bloodhound-class gun-brig	John Randall & Co.	Rotherhithe	United Kingdom	For Royal Navy.
2 April	Bloodhound	Bloodhound-class gun-brig	John Randall	Rotherhithe	United Kingdom	For Royal Navy.
2 April	Censor	Bloodhound-class gun-brig	John Randall	Rotherhithe	United Kingdom	For Royal Navy.
2 April	Locust	Gun-brig	Frances Barnard	Deptford	United Kingdom	For Royal Navy.
4 April	Ferreter	Bloodhound-class gun-brig	John Perry	Blackwall	United Kingdom	For Royal Navy.
4 April	Mariner	Archer-class gun-brig	Thomas Pitcher	Northfleet	United Kingdom	For Royal Navy.
4 April	Starling	Bloodhound-class gun-brig	Balthazar Adams	Buckler's Hard	United Kingdom	For Royal Navy.
4 April	Starling	Bloodhound-class gun-brig	Balthazar & Edward Adams	Bursledon	United Kingdom	For Royal Navy.
11 April	Mallard	Archer-class gun-brig	Frances Barnard	Deptford	United Kingdom	For Royal Navy.
14 April	Medusa	Amphion-class frigate	Thomas Pitcher	Northfleet	United Kingdom	For Royal Navy.
14 April	Minx	Archer-class gun-brig	Thomas Pitcher	Northfleet	United Kingdom	For Royal Navy.
16 April	Bold	Archer-class gun-brig	Wells & Co.	Blackwall Yard	United Kingdom	For Royal Navy.
17 April	Charger	Archer-class gun-brig	John Dudman	Deptford	United Kingdom	For Royal Navy.
17 April	Conflict	Archer-class gun-brig	Dudman & Co.	Deptford	United Kingdom	For Royal Navy.
28 April	Constant	Archer-class gun-brig	John Dudman	Deptford Dockyard	United Kingdom	For Royal Navy.
29 April	Resistance	Fifth rate	George Parsons	Bursledon	United Kingdom	For Royal Navy.
2 May	Elizabeth	Merchantman	William Naylor Wright	Liverpool	United Kingdom	For Robert Charnock.
2 May	Snipe	Bloodhound-class gun-brig	Balthazar and Edward Adams	Bursledon	United Kingdom	For Royal Navy.
10 May	Héros	Téméraire-class ship of the line		Rochefort	France	For French Navy.
11 May	Monkey	Bloodhound-class gun-brig	John Nicholson	Rochester	United Kingdom	For Royal Navy.
12 May	Narcissus	Narcissus-class frigate	Edward Tippett	Deptford	United Kingdom	For Royal Navy.
May	L'Invention	Privateer	Jean-François Thibault	Bordeaux	France	For Jean-François Thibault.
9 June	Vixen	Bloodhound-class gun-brig	Balthazar Adams	Buckler's Hard	United Kingdom	For Royal Navy.
13 June	Dreadnought	Neptune-class ship of the line		Portsmouth Dockyard	United Kingdom	For Royal Navy.
15 June	Ann	Full-rigged ship	Randall	Rotherhithe	United Kingdom	For Matthew White.
18 June	Atlas	Merchantman	Temple shipbuilders	South Shields	United Kingdom	For Simon Temple.
27 June	General Stuart	East Indiaman	J. Dudman	Deptford	United Kingdom	For East India Company.
27 June	Gilwell	Merchantman	Matthew Smith	Calcutta	India	For private owner.
27 June	Tartar	Narcissus-class frigate	Bridley	Frindsbury	United Kingdom	For Royal Navy.
2 July	David Scott	Merchantman	Jamsetjee Bomanjee Wadia	Bombay Dockyard	India	For Thomas Garland Murray.
11 July	Northampton	Merchantman	Peter Everitt Mestaer	Rotherhithe	United Kingdom	For captain Barker.
July	Jean	Brig			United Kingdom	For private owner.
20 August	Carrère	Frigate		Venice	Venetian Province	For French Navy.
24 August	Medway	Merchantman		Fort William	India	For private owner.
29 August	Speshnyi	Fifth rate	F. Ignatyev	Arkhangelsk	Russia	For Imperial Russian Navy.
31 August	Lillebælt	Corvette	Fugelsang	Copenhagen	Denmark-Norway	For Dano-Norwegian Navy.
9 September	Retreat	Merchantman	Obadiah Ayles	Topsham	United Kingdom	For Mr. Wigram.
23 September	Aigle	Aigle-class frigate	Balthazar & Edward Adams	Bucklers Hard	United Kingdom	For Royal Navy.
7 October	Alcion	Alcion-class brig		Nantes	France	For French Navy.
7 October	Goéland	Alcion-class brig		Nantes	France	For French Navy.
22 October	Plantagenet	Third rate	Edward Sison	Woolwich Dockyard	United Kingdom	For Royal Navy.
24 October	Name unknown	West Indiaman	Parr	Plymouth	United Kingdom	For private owner.
6 November	Countess of Sutherland	Merchantman	Hamilton & Aberdeen	Tittaghur	India	For Hamilton & Aberdeen.
7 November	David Scott	East Indiaman	Pitcher	Northfleet	United Kingdom	For John Locke.
7 November	Diligente	Diligente-class corvette		Brest	France	For French Navy.
10 November	Krepkii	Fourth rate	V. I. Popatov	Kherson	Russia	For Imperial Russian Navy.
13 November	Alnwick Castle	East Indiaman	Perry	Blackwall	United Kingdom	For East India Company.
20 November	Farne	Full-rigged ship	Moore	Plymouth	United Kingdom	For private owner.
23 November	Conqueror	Third rate	Joseph Graham	Harwich	United Kingdom	For Royal Navy.
5 December	Perseverance	East Indiaman	Pitcher	Northfleet	United Kingdom	For East India Company.
15 December	Atlas	Merchantman	William Baldwin	Quebec City	(United Kingdom of Great Britain and Ireland) Lower Canada	For W. Beatson & Co.
21 December	Name unknown	90-gun Man-of-war		Constantinople	Ottoman Empire	For Ottoman Navy.
22 December	Betsey	Full-rigged ship	Edward Bacon	Calcutta	India	For Edward Bacon.
23 December	United Kingdom	East Indiaman	Perry, Wells & Green	Blackwall	United Kingdom	For East India Company.
24 December	Furet	Abeille-class brig		Toulon	France	For French Navy.
Unknown date	Aberdeen	West Indiaman		Aberdeen	United Kingdom	For Mr. Gibbon.
Unknown date	Aguilar	West Indiaman	William Watson	East Stockwith	United Kingdom	For J. Braddick & Co.
Unknown date	Alexander	Merchantman		South Shields	United Kingdom	For F. Hurry & Co.
Unknown date	Alexander	Merchantman	Henry Baldwin	Quebec City	(United Kingdom of Great Britain and Ireland) Lower Canada	For John Lock.
Unknown date	Althea	Merchantman	J. Gilmore & Co.	Calcutta	India	For J. Gilmore & Co.
Unknown date	Amity	Merchantman		Mistley	United Kingdom	For Warran & Co.
Unknown date	Ann	Brig		Fowey	United Kingdom	For Ball & Co.
Unknown date	Baring	East Indiaman	Barnard	Deptford	United Kingdom	For East India Company.
Unknown date	Berk	Third rate		Rhodes	(Ottoman Empire) Ottoman Greece	For Ottoman Navy.
Unknown date	Betsey	Merchantman		Poole	United Kingdom	For private owner.
Unknown date	Bombay	Brig	Bomanjee	Damão	(Portugal) Portuguese India	For private owner.
Unknown date	Brevdrageren	Brevdrageren-class brig	Frantz Hohlenberg	Nyholm	Denmark-Norway	For Dano-Norwegian Navy.
Unknown date	British Hero	Merchantman	Thomas Hearns	North Shields	United Kingdom	For private owner.
Unknown date	Cato	Schooner	Nicholas Bools & William Good	Bridport	United Kingdom	For Mr. Lambden.
Unknown date	City of London	West Indiaman	William Rowe	Newcastle upon Tyne	United Kingdom	For Fenn & Co.
Unknown date	Cumberland	Schooner	Thomas Moore	King's Dockyard, Sydney	(United Kingdom of Great Britain and Ireland) New South Wales	For Colonial Government of New South Wales.
Unknown date	Darlington	Merchantman		Sunderland	United Kingdom	For private owner.
Unknown date	Doris	Merchantman	John & Philip Laing	Sunderland	United Kingdom	For private owner.
Unknown date	Duchess of York	Schooner	Hudson & Bacon	Calcutta	India	For Royal Navy.
Unknown date	Elizabeth	Full-rigged ship		Bridlington	United Kingdom	For private owner.
Unknown date	Fame	Merchantman	James M. Hillhouse	Bristol	United Kingdom	For private owner.
Unknown date	Fame	East Indiaman	John Perry	Blackwall	United Kingdom	For East India Company.
Unknown date	Fethiye	First rate		Constantinople	Ottoman Empire	For Ottoman Navy.
Unknown date	Flying Fish	Schooner		Baltimore, Maryland	United States	For private owner.
Unknown date	Fuerte	Sixth rate	Reales Astilleros de Esteiro	Ferrol	Spain	For Spanish Navy.
Unknown date	General Augereau	Ketch			France	For private owner.
Unknown date	General Baird	Merchantman		Rangoon	(United Kingdom of Great Britain and Ireland) Burma	For Fairlie, Gilmore & Co.
Unknown date	George	Smack	Nicholas Bools & William Good	Bridport	United Kingdom	For George Browne.
Unknown date	Giano	Brig			Ligurian Republic	For Ligurian Navy.
Unknown date	Hercules	Merchantman	Temple shipbuilders	South Shields	United Kingdom	For Temple & Co.
Unknown date	Hercules	collier		South Shields	United Kingdom	For private owner.
Unknown date	Hope	Merchantman	John & Philip Laing	Sunderland	United Kingdom	For Francis Vasic.
Unknown date	Hunter	Sloop-of-war	Thomas King	Dover	United Kingdom	For Royal Navy.
Unknown date	Jefferson	Yacht	Christopher Turne	Salem, Massachusetts	United States	For George Crowninshield Jr., John Crowninsheild Veily and Calem Johnson.
Unknown date	Kenau Hasselaar	Fifth rate	Pieter Glavimans	Rotterdam	Batavian Republic	For Batavian Navy.
Unknown date	Lady Nelson	Merchantman		Bermuda	(United Kingdom of Great Britain and Ireland) Bermuda	For J. Atkins.
Unknown date	Lavinia	Cutter	Nicholas Bools & William Good	Bridport	United Kingdom	For J. Murphy.
Unknown date	Liguria	Man-of-war			Ligurian Republic	For Ligurian Navy.
Unknown date	Little Catherine	Merchantman		Bermuda	(United Kingdom of Great Britain and Ireland) Bermuda	For private owner.
Unknown date	Lord Eldon	Merchantman		Sunderland, County Durham	United Kingdom	For Mr. Kave.
Unknown date	Lord Kinnaird	Smack	Nicholas Bools & William Good	Bridport	United Kingdom	For Dundee Shipping Co.
Unknown date	Majestic	Merchantman	Chapman & Campion	Whitby	United Kingdom	For E. Champion.
Unknown date	Majestic	Merchantman		Whitby	United Kingdom	For private owner.
Unknown date	Margaret	Merchantman	John & Philip Laing	Sunderland	United Kingdom	For E. Gray.
Unknown date	Mersey	Merchantman		Chittagong	India	For private owner.
Unknown date	Nautilus	Brig	T. Nicholson & Col	Sunderland	United Kingdom	For private owner.
Unknown date	Nonpareil	Merchantman	Price	Baltimore, Maryland	United States	For private owner.
Unknown date	Numa	Merchantman		Baltimore, Maryland	United States	For private owner.
Unknown date	Pallas	Fifth rate	Pieter Glavimans		Batavian Republic	For Batavian Navy.
Unknown date	Paragon	Merchantman	John Brockbank	Lancaster	United Kingdom	For Mr. Ridley.
Unknown date	Perseverance	Whaler		Rotherhithe	United Kingdom	For Mr. Mellish.
Unknown date	Policy	Whaler		Dartmouth	United Kingdom	For Hurry & Co.
Unknown date	Proserpine	Frigate		Amsterdam	Batavian Republic	For Dutch Navy.
Unknown date	Queen Charlotte	Merchantman		Calcutta	India	For Colvin, Bazett & Co.
Unknown date	Queen Charlotte	Packet ship		Emsworth	United Kingdom	For Post Office Packet Service.
Unknown date	Rebecca Sims	Merchantman	Samuel Bowers	Philadelphia, Pennsylvania	United States	For Joseph Sims.
Unknown date	Restauration	Sloop		Hardanger	Denmark-Norway	For private owner.
Unknown date	Stirling Castle	Merchantman		Calcutta	India	For private owner.
Unknown date	Superior	Merchantman		Talbot County, Maryland	United States	For Charles Boislandry & Felix Imbert.
Unknown date	Supply	Waterboat		Bombay	India	For East India Company.
Unknown date	Süreyya	Fifth rate			Ottoman Empire	For Ottoman Navy.
Unknown date	Ternate	Brig		Bombay	India	For East India Company.
Unknown date	Thames	Full-rigged ship			United Kingdom	For private owner.
Unknown date	Theseus	Merchantman	John & Philip Laing	Sunderland	United Kingdom	For ohn & Philip Laing.
Unknown date	Thetis	West Indiaman		Lancaster	United Kingdom	For Mr. Houseman.
Unknown date	Trelawney Planter	West Indiaman		Saint Andrew Parish, Jamaica	(United Kingdom of Great Britain and Ireland) Jamaica	For Mr. Sheddon.
Unknown date	Trio	Merchantman		New Brunswick	(United Kingdom of Great Britain and Ireland)	For private owner.
Unknown date	Union	Merchantman		Calcutta	India	For private owner.
Unknown date	Vaillant	Privateer		Bordeaux	France	For private owner.
Unknown date	Warrior	Merchantman	Simon Temple	South Shields	United Kingdom	For S. Temple.
Unknown date	Wolf	Cutter		Cowes	United Kingdom	For Board of Customs.
Unknown date	Name unknown	Merchantman		South Shields	United Kingdom	For private owner.
Unknown date	Name unknown	Merchantman			United States	For private owner.
Unknown date	Name unknown	Full-rigged ship		New England	United States	For private owner.
Unknown date	Name unknown	Merchantman			Spain	For private owner.
Unknown date	Name unknown	Merchantman			United States	For private owner.
