= David Scott (disambiguation) =

David Scott (born 1932) is an American astronaut.

David or Dave Scott may also refer to:

== Arts and entertainment ==
- David Scott (painter) (1806–1849), Scottish painter
- David Scott (art historian) (1916–2009), American artist and art historian
- David Scott (poet) (1947–2022), English priest and writer
- Scotty (reggae vocalist) or David Scott (1950–2003), Jamaican reggae musician
- David Scott (author) (born 1961), American author
- David Scott (Pearlfishers) (born 1964), member of pop group Pearlfishers
- David Scott (born 1988), South African musician known as The Kiffness
- David Scott (21st century), US developer of computer game Flash Element TD
- David E. Scott (born 1939), Canadian writer
- Dave Scott (artist) (born 1994), American painter
- Dave Scott (choreographer) (1972–2025), American hip-hop dance teacher, choreographer and talent developer

== Politics ==
- David Scott (of Scotstarvit) (1689–1766), Scottish politician
- David Scott (of Dunninald) (1746–1805), Scottish merchant, director of East India Company, MP 1790–1805
- Sir David Scott, 2nd Baronet (1782–1851), British MP
- David Scott (Wisconsin pioneer) (1795–1864), Wisconsin and New York politician
- David Scott (Pennsylvania politician), U.S. Representative 1816–1817
- David Scott (Tasmanian politician) (1837–1893), Australian politician
- David Lynch Scott (1845–1924), Canadian militia officer and lawyer, and judge
- David Scott (New South Wales politician) (1848–1927), Australian politician
- Sir David Aubrey Scott (1919–2010), British diplomat
- David Scott (Georgia politician) (1945–2026), U.S. Representative

== Sports ==
- David Scott (gymnast) (1874–1959), Scottish
- David Scott (footballer) (born 1955), Australian rules footballer
- David Scott (rugby league) (born 1993), Scottish
- David Scott (cricketer) (born 1998), English
- Dave Scott (American football) (born 1953), American football player
- Dave Scott (triathlete) (born 1954), American triathlete

== Other ==
- David Scott (anthropologist) (born 1958), Columbia University anthropologist
- David Scott (Royal Navy officer) (1921–2006)
- David Scott (priest) (1924–1996), Archdeacon of Stow, England
- David J. Scott (born c. 1956), U.S. Air Force major general
- David Meerman Scott (born 1961), American online marketing strategist and author
- David Scott (headmaster), Australian educationalist
- David H. Scott (1916–2000), American geologist and planetary scientist
- David Scott (ship), several vessels of that name
