= Majestic (ship) =

Several ships have been named Majestic:

== Sail ==
- Majestic (1801 ship) was launched at Whitby. She was a London-based transport, though she also sailed to the Baltic. She was sold to the government in 1810.
- HMS Hermes was launched as the mercantile Majestic at Whitby in 1801. The British Royal Navy purchased Majestic in 1803. She had an uneventful career and the Navy sold her in 1810.
- Majestic (1804 ship) was launched at Whitby. She served the government as a transport until she burned at Barbados on 20 October 1808.
- Majestic (1811 ship) was launched at Sunderland. She was a northern whale fishery whaler that was wrecked on 16 July 1819 in Davis Strait.
- Majestic (1818 ship) was launched at Sunderland.
- Majestic (1829 ship) was launched at Aberdeen. In 1838 she transported convicts to Tasmania. She was last listed in 1843.

== Steam ==
- RMS Majestic was a steamship built in 1889 for the White Star Line. The British Admiralty provided a subsidy on the condition that she was designed for rapid conversion for Royal Navy use in wartime as an armed merchant cruiser. She was scrapped in 1914.
- RMS Majestic was a White Star ocean liner on the North Atlantic run, originally launched in 1914 as the Hamburg America Line liner SS Bismarck. Due to World War I she never sailed under the German flag except on sea trials in 1922. She served successfully throughout the 1920s but the onset of the Great Depression made her increasingly unprofitable. She was sold off for scrapping but the British Admiralty intervened and she served the Royal Navy as the training ship HMS Caledonia before catching fire in 1939 and sinking. She was subsequently raised and scrapped in 1943.

== Royal Navy ==
- HMS Majestic - four active service vessels (sail and steam) of the Royal Navy, plus one planned.
