= Albacete (surname) =

Albacete is a Spanish surname. Notable people with the surname include:

- Antonio Albacete (born 1965), Spanish racing driver
- Lorenzo Albacete (1941–2014), American Roman Catholic priest and theologian
- Patricio Albacete (born 1981), Argentine rugby union player
