= British Hero (ship) =

Several vessels have been named British Hero:

- British Hero (1801 ship) was launched in North Shields. A French privateer captured her in January or February 1806.
- British Hero (1809 ship) was launched at Jarrow. She initially was a government transport and so did not appear in Lloyd's Register or the Register of Shipping until she came into mercantile service c. 1813. She was lost in November 1816 on a voyage to India.
