= William Heathcote =

William Heathcote may refer to:

- Sir William Heathcote, 1st Baronet (1693–1751), British merchant and politician
- Sir William Heathcote, 3rd Baronet (1746–1819), British politician
- Sir William Heathcote, 5th Baronet (1801–1881), British politician
- William Heathcote (1800 ship), British slave ship and West Indiaman
