= David Scott (ship) =

Several ships have been named David Scott:

- David Scott (1801 Bombay ship) launched at Bombay in 1801. She was a "country ship", i.e., she generally traded east of the Cape of Good Hope. Between 1802 and 1816 she made five voyages between India and the United Kingdom as an "extra ship" for the British East India Company (EIC). Thereafter she traded between Britain and India under a license from the EIC. A fire destroyed her at Mauritius on 12 June 1841.
- David Scott (1801 EIC ship) was launched on the Thames as an East Indiaman. Between 1801 and 1816 she made seven voyages for the EIC. She was sold in 1816 for hulking.

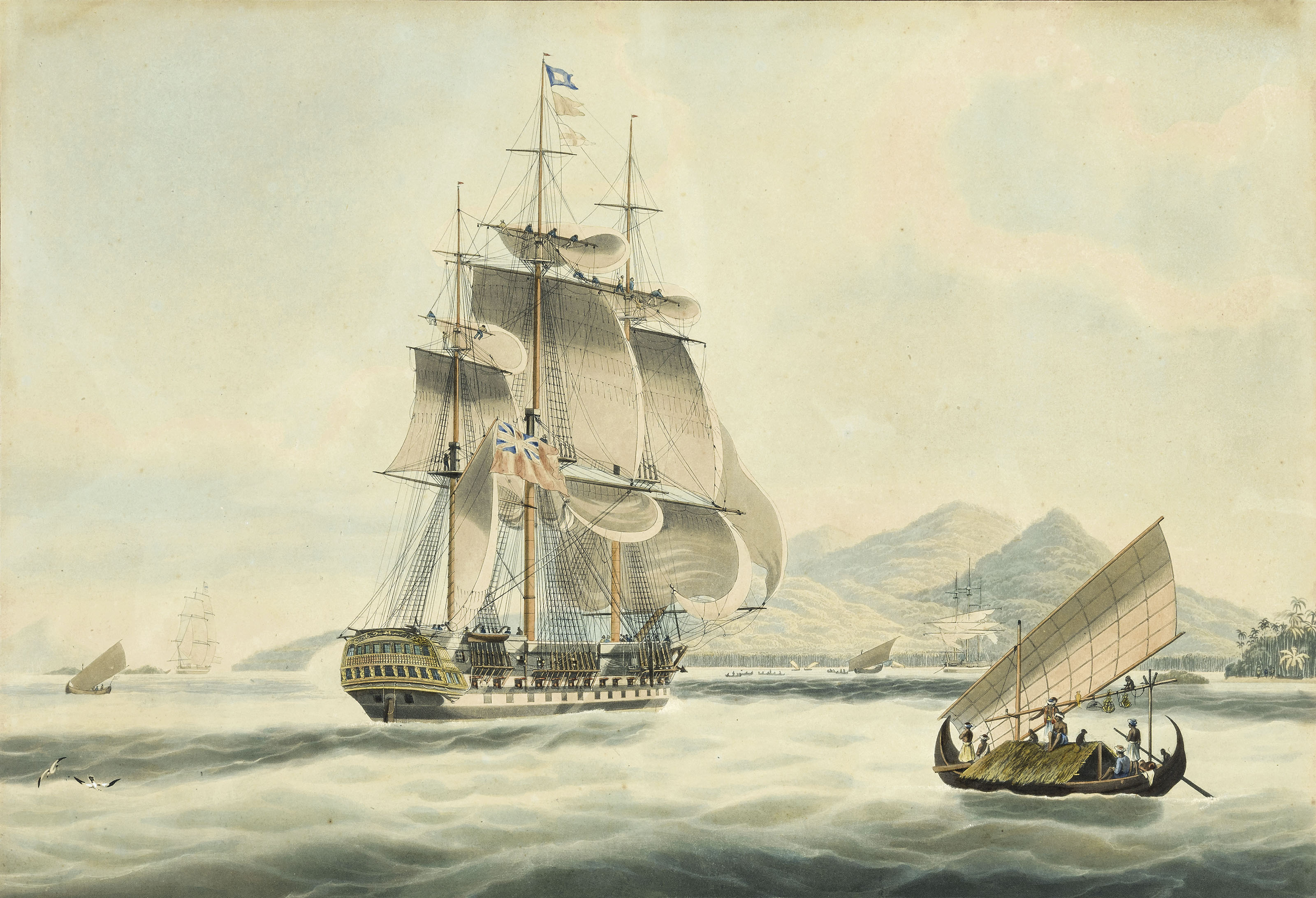
The H.C.S. Sir David Scott, Captn. D. I. Ward. at the entrance of the Straights of Sunda. February 1830

- Sir David Scott (1821 EIC ship) was launched at Ipswich as an East Indiaman. Between 1821 and 1833 she made six voyages for the EIC. She was sold for breaking up in 1838.
