= General Augereau (1801 ship) =

History

France
- Name: General Augereau
- Namesake: Charles-Pierre Augereau
- Launched: 1801
- Captured: 13 February 1805

United Kingdom
- Name: General Angereau
- Acquired: 1805 by purchase of a prize
- Fate: Last listed in 1813

General characteristics
- Tons burthen: 148, or 162 (French) (bm)
- Sail plan: Ketch
- Complement: 88 (at capture)
- Armament: 1803: 12 guns or carronades; 1805:14 × 12-pounder carronades (at capture); 1805:12 × 12-pounder guns

General Augereau (or General Angereaux) was a ketch launched in 1801 and recommissioned in Bayonne in 1803 as a privateer. She made a small number of captures during her first cruise, but then the British Royal Navy captured her in February 1805 during her second cruise. She became a British merchantman, sailing between Cork and Liverpool, and was last listed in 1813.

== French privateer ==
General Augereau was recommissioned as a privateer in Bayonne in July 1803. From July 1803 to September 1804, she was under the command of Étienne Pellot, with 11 officers, 74 men, and 12 carronades.

On 2 May 1804 Ranger, Phelps, master, and Mary Ann, Doyle, master, sailed from Waterford, bound for Newfoundland. They were under escort by HMS Spitfire, but separated from her that same night in a gale. On 6 May General Angereaux, of Bayonne, 16 guns and 120 men, captured them about 160 miles from Cape Clear Island. General Angereaux plundered Ranger, but then gave her up to the crews and passengers of both vessels. Ranger arrived back at Waterford on 10 May. Mary Ann was sent for Spain or France.

In April 1804 General Angereaux captured and sank Sisters, Rowe, master, which was on a voyage from Dartmouth, Devon to Newfoundland. General Angereaux put the crew aboard Sampson, which arrived at Torbay.

On 6 June the "privateer Angereau" captured Zephyr, Jackson, master, which was on her way from Gibraltar and Lisbon to Cork. The capture took place off Cape Clear. Angereau took Zephyr into Muros. On the same cruise she also captured Marguerite, Marianne, and Lovely.

On 4 August 1804 William Heathcote was returning to Liverpool from Demerara when General Augereau, of 12 guns and 90 men, captured her. In the action leading up to the capture, Captain Phillips, his son, a passenger, and a seaman were killed, and the mate, a passenger and seven seamen wounded; General Auguereau had three men killed and her captain and five men wounded. On 9 August HMS Nautilus recaptured William Heathcote and sent her into Plymouth.

On 8 August 1804 HMS Lapwing encountered General Augereau and chased her for three days, but General Augereaux eventually escaped in light winds.

General Augereau was under the command of a different captain from late 1804 to February 1805, with 70 to 88 men, until HMS Topaze captured her on 13 February 1805 in the Caribbean. "General Angereau" arrived at Cork in March. She was armed with fourteen 12-pounder carronades, had a crew of 88 men, and had been out 47 days without having captured anything.

== English merchantman ==
General Angereau first appeared in Lloyd's Register (LR) in 1805.

Year	Master	Owner	Trade	Source
1805		R.Stewart	Cork–Liverpool	LR
1809	S.Stewart	R.Stewart	Cork–Liverpool	Register of Shipping
1813	S.Stewart	R.Stewart	Cork–Liverpool	Register of Shipping

== Fate ==
General Angereaux was last listed in 1813.

== See also ==
- Sandre, Thierry (1932). Le corsaire Pellot qui courut pour le roi, pour la république et pour l'empereur, et qui était Basque. La Renaissance du livre.
