= Général Pérignon (1804 ship) =

History

France
- Name: Général Pérignon
- Namesake: Catherine-Dominique de Pérignon
- Builder: Saint-Malo
- Laid down: August 1803
- Launched: February 1804
- Commissioned: March 1804
- Captured: 21 January 1810

United Kingdom
- Name: Intention
- Acquired: 1810 by purchase of a prize
- Fate: Last listed 1816

General characteristics
- Tons burthen: 305, or 30559/94 (bm)
- Length: 92 ft 1 3/4 in (28.1 m)
- Beam: 28 ft 9 in (8.8 m)
- Depth: 10 ft 3 in (3.1 m)
- Sail plan: Brig
- Complement: 94
- Armament: 14

Général Pérignon was a brig launched at Saint-Malo in February 1804 as a privateer. She captured numerous British merchant vessels over several cruises. In January 1810 the British Royal Navy captured her. She was sold in March 1810 and became a coaster sailing between Plymouth and London under her original name, or as Intention. She was last listed in 1816.

== Privateer ==
Général Pérignon's first cruise took place from March to June 1804. She was under the command of Captain Le Comte.

Général Pérignon's second cruise took place between September 1804 to March 1805. She sailed to Martinique under the command of Captain Dupont. A report from Paris dated 19 December 1804 stated that Général Pérignon had sent into port Aurora, with coals, and Courier, with sail cloth and provisions.

In November General Pirignon was off Land's End. She captured two vessels off Penzance, Onisphorou, Tremathush, master, and George & Francis, Trumbull, master, She also captured Aurora, Daymont, master, sailing to Waterford, and Kite, of Galway Lacy, master, sailing from Guernsey to Bergen. George & Francis foundered subsequently.

On 13 January 1805 Général Pérignon captured Barzilla, Hurst, master, off Scilly. On 20 January HMS Melampus recaptured Barzilla. The report noted that Général Pérignon had captured 18 other vessels on her cruize.

On 9 February 1805 Général Pérignon captured the brig Spring off Land's End. Spring was returning from Newfoundland with a cargo of fish. Three days later HMS Sirius recaptured Spring.

By mid-February 1805 Sorcière and Général Pérignon had made a number of captures: Rover, of Jersey; Nancy (8 guns), from Lisbon; Victor, of Poole, from Newfoundland; Ark, of Poole, from Newfoundland; and Peggy, of 150 tons, carrying iron for London. They also burned three vessels: brig Temple, from Swansea; Hebe, of Guernsey, from Dublin; and Nancy, of Irvine. Général Pérignon captured Ann, Thomson, master, which had been sailing from London to Limerick. HMS Niobe recaptured Ann and sent her into Plymouth.

On 23 February 1805 HMS Nautilus sent into Plymouth a valuable Spanish ship from the River Plate. The Spanish ship had fallen prey first to a Jersey privateer, and then to Général Pérignon before Nautilus recaptured her. The Spaniard may have been the vessel Carmella, which had been carrying specie.

Général Pérignon's third cruise took place from March 1805 to December 1805 while she was under the command of René Rosse. Off Land's End Général Pérignon captured Friendship, Featherston, sailing from Dublin to London, Glory, of Exeter, Gatter, master, sailing from Exmouth to Wales, and a vessel from Lisbon. Friendship was carried into Brest.

The French Journal de Commerce reported on 22 November 1805 that Général Pérignon, of Saint-Malo, had returned from a cruise during which she had taken four prizes. Two were carrying muslins and cloths to Naples, and two were coming from Antigua to London. One of the West Indiamen arrived at Royan. She was carrying 400 barrels of sugar, coffee, and cotton. On 10 November HMS Isis recaptured Partridge, Teed, master, which had been coming from Antigua when Général Pérignon had captured her on 6 November about 15 leagues north of Scilly. Partridge arrived at Cork on 18 November. Elizabeth, Dunlop, master, had been sailing from Liverpool to Naples when Général Pérignon captured her. Général Pérignon took Elizabeth into Lorient.

Her fourth and fifth took place between January 1806 and March 1807. She was under the command of Jacques Dupuy-Fromy. The Journal de Commerce reported that Général Pérignon had arrived at Saint-Malo on 13 February 1806 with two English prizes, one of 300 tons and one of 400. They were carrying sugar, coffee, rum, logwood, etc. One of the British vessels was British Hero, of 300 tons, and the other was City of London, of 379 tons. Général Pérignon brought them into Saint-Malo.

In March 1807 General Perpignon captured and burnt Clothier, Edwards, master, off Rochefort. Clothier was a victualer serving the British blockading squadron.

On 29 December 1806 General Perpignon [sic] captured Patent, Barugh, master, at 49°48′N 8°30′W as Patent was on her way from New Providence to London. However the gun-brig HMS Sharp Shooter and the hired armed cutter Britannia recaptured Patent and sent her into Plymouth. (Note: Patent, of 223 tons (bm), had been launched at Lynn in 1803.)

The French newspaper Moniteur reported on 31 January 1807 that Général Pérignon had sent into "Peros" two English prizes on 28 January. One was Unity, of 200 tons. The other was Enterprize, of 260 tons, Burgess, master. She had been sailing from Suriname. Unity was a transport, sailing in ballast.

Général Pérignon's sixth cruise took place under André Papin from November 1807 to March 1808, with possibly a spell under René Rosse again in 1807. On 9 April 1808, she was seized in Ribadeo, Spain, before being released after a long trial. She sailed to Bayonne where she was recommissioned in September 1809 under the same name and under André Papin.

Capture: Amazon captured General Perignon on 21 January 1810 after a chase of 160 miles. (Note: The auction notice of her sale referred to a chase of 36 hours at a rate of 12 knots.) She was armed with 14 guns and had a crew of 83 men. She had left Saint-Malo on 5 January and had captured the brig Unanimity, of Porto. (Note: HMS Eclipse recaptured Unanimity, prior to 4 February 1810. Unanimity had been sailing from Oporto to Leith. Unanimity arrived at Plymouth on 4 February.) General Perignon came into Plymouth in late January. She had reportedly taken four prizes before she was captured.

General Perignon was sold at auction in Plymouth on 16 March 1810. She was described as being pierced for 18 guns and having a deep waist with scantlings sufficient for her to add another deck.

== Merchantman ==
Lloyd's Register (LR) for 1810 carried the brig Intention, of 305 tons (bm), launched in France in 1804, with trade Plymouth–London. It also carried the brig General Perignon, with exactly the same data, including the names of the masters and owners. The two listings coincided until both vessels were last listed in 1816.

Year	Master	Owner	Trade	Source
1810	Livingston	Mulurle	Plymouth–London	LR
1816	Livingston	Mulurle	Plymouth–London	LR
