= Étienne Pellot =

Étienne Pellot "Montvieux", aka le Renard Basque (the Basque fox), (French: [etjɛn pɛlɔ]; 1 September 1765, Hendaye, France – 1856, Hendaye), was the last known French corsair, renowned for his bravery and success.

Some of his ships, notably Deux-Amis and General Augereau, have gone down in corsair legend. He received the Légion d'honneur. Etienne Pellot died in Hendaye in 1856.

Every January, children dress up as corsairs and parade the streets of Hendaye to celebrate the return of Étienne Pellot, the last Basque corsair.
