= Godspy =

- Website type: Online Magazine
- Creator: Angelo Matera
- Website: http://www.godspy.com/
- Commercial: Yes
- Registration: Optional
- Launched: 2003

Godspy is a dormant English-language online magazine "for Catholics and other seekers" launched in 2003, dealing with subjects from "politics to the arts, science to the economy, sexuality to ecology," and exploring the "ideas and experiences that reveal God's presence in the world." The magazine's name was inspired by the line in King Lear: "And take upon's the mystery of things, As if we were God's spies".

It is ad-supported and is available to read free of charge. The site is supposedly updated daily, while the magazine portion of the site is monthly, but no new content has been posted since February 2009. It has been noted as "the rare faith-based site that unabashedly promotes its point of view while remaining relevant to all readers."

Its editorial board and contributors include such notable figures as its editors Austen Ivereigh and David Scott. It also has as theological advisor and contributor the internationally recognized theologian, scientist, and author Lorenzo Albacete.

Godspy's headquarters are located in New York, New York.

== Editorial stance ==
According to Editor/Publisher Angelo Matera the magazine covers "topics and perspectives that the secular press either ignores or treats superficially". He describes Godspy's vision as follows:

In a post-modern world caught between the irrational certainties of religious fanatics and the dictatorship of "whatever" relativism, GodSpy tries to offer an alternative—a Catholic vision that shows it's possible both to believe and think critically, to stand firm and remain open to reality, to live by moral absolutes and love unconditionally.

To reach the most skeptical, Godspy emphasizes Catholic thinkers and writers who are most credible to secular audiences, artists who can convincingly show that truth, beauty and goodness are compatible with mystery, freedom and desire. We try to showcase nonfiction writing that fulfills what the acclaimed Catholic fiction writer Flannery O'Connor once said: "there is no reason why fixed dogma should fix anything that the writer sees in the world . . . dogma is an instrument for penetrating reality."

In the end, what we're trying to do is illustrate, however imperfectly, what Pope Benedict XVI explained in his encyclical, Deus caritas est (God is Love): that salvation doesn't require an escape from our humanity—it runs right through it.
