= David E. Scott =

Canadian writer (born 1939)

David E. Scott (born 1939) is a Canadian writer from Ontario.

== Biography ==
David E. Scott was born in 1939 and received his education in Quebec, New Brunswick, and Ontario. He had a long career in journalism, working variously as a reporter, photographer, and editor, including as a bureau chief for The Canadian Press and travel editor for the London Free Press. He was the owner and publisher of two newspapers in Ontario, including the Fort Erie Times-Review, which he purchased in 1965. Scott sold his publishing company, David E. Scott Publishing, along with its publications in September 1969. In the early 1970s, he owned a disco bar in the Principality of Andorra. He re-established David E. Scott Publishing in 2001 as a book publishing company, with its first two titles being a third edition of his Ontario Place Names and More Great Canadian Fishing Stories.

Scott is the author of several titles on the subject of place-names in Canada, such as Ontario Place Names and New Brunswick Place Names.

== Publications ==
- Scott, David E. (1988). On the Road. London, ON: London Free Press.
- — (1991). The Ontario Getaway Guidebook. Leaside, ON: Whitecap Books. ISBN 1-8950-9946-3.
- — (1991). A Taste of Ontario Country Inns. Leaside, ON: Whitecap Books. ISBN 1-8950-9995-1.
- — (1992). Ontario for Free (and Almost Free). Leaside, ON: Whitecap Books. ISBN 1-5511-0039-8.
- — (1993). Ontario Place Names. Leaside, ON: Whitecap Books. ISBN 1-5511-0093-2.
  - — (1997). Ontario Place Names (2nd ed.). Vancouver, B.C.: Lone Pine Publishing. ISBN 1-5510-5087-0.
  - — (2001). Ontario Place Names (3rd ed.). Allanburg, ON: DESPUB. ISBN 0-9688-9960-9.
  - — (2004). Ontario Place Names (4th ed.). Allanburg, ON: DESPUB. ISBN 0-9688-9969-2.
  - — (2007). Ontario Place Names (5th ed.). Allanburg, ON: DESPUB. ISBN 0-9735-2055-8.
  - — (2010). Ontario Place Names (6th ed.). Allanburg, ON: DESPUB. ISBN 978-0-9865-3700-4.
- — (1997). Quick Escapes Toronto: 26 Weekend Trips in Ontario. Essex, CT: Globe Pequot Press. ISBN 0-7627-0041-6.
- — (1997). Great Canadian Fishing Stories. Vancouver, B.C.: Lone Pine Publishing. ISBN 1-5510-5118-4.
- — (2001). More Great Canadian Fishing Stories. Allanburg, ON: DESPUB. ISBN 978-0-9688-9961-8.
- — (2002). One Man's Meat is Another Man's Poisson. Cayuga, ON: Books for Pleasure. ISBN 978-1-5534-9055-5.
- — (2002). Days of Wine and Rascals. Cayuga, ON: Books for Pleasure. ISBN 978-1-5534-9052-4.
- — (2002). Fisherman's Log Book. Allanburg, ON: DESPUB. ISBN 978-0-9688-9964-9.
- — (2002). Travellers' Log Book. Allanburg, ON: DESPUB. ISBN 978-0-9688-9962-5.
- — (2004). Been There Done That. Allanburg, ON: DESPUB. ISBN 978-0-9735-2050-7.
- — (2008). Azteca. Allanburg, ON: DESPUB. ISBN 978-0-9735-2058-3.
- — (2008). New Brunswick Place Names. Allanburg, ON: DESPUB. ISBN 978-0-9735-2056-9.
- — (2010). Winds of Change. Allanburg, ON: DESPUB. ISBN 978-0-9735-2059-0.
- — (2011). Nova Scotia Place Names. Allanburg, ON: DESPUB. ISBN 978-0-9865-3701-1.
  - — (2015). Nova Scotia Place Names. Halifax, N.S.: Nimbus Publishing. ISBN 978-1-7710-8318-8.
- — (2012). Newfoundland and Labrador Place Names. Allanburg, ON: DESPUB. ISBN 978-0-9865-3703-5.
- — (2013). Prince Edward Island Place Names. Allanburg, ON: DESPUB. ISBN 978-0-9865-3707-3.
- — (2015). Atlantic Canada's Unusual Place Names. Halifax, N.S.: Nimbus Publishing. ISBN 978-1-7710-8326-3.
