= Stephen Sacklarian =

Bulgarian Armenian American artist (1899–1983)

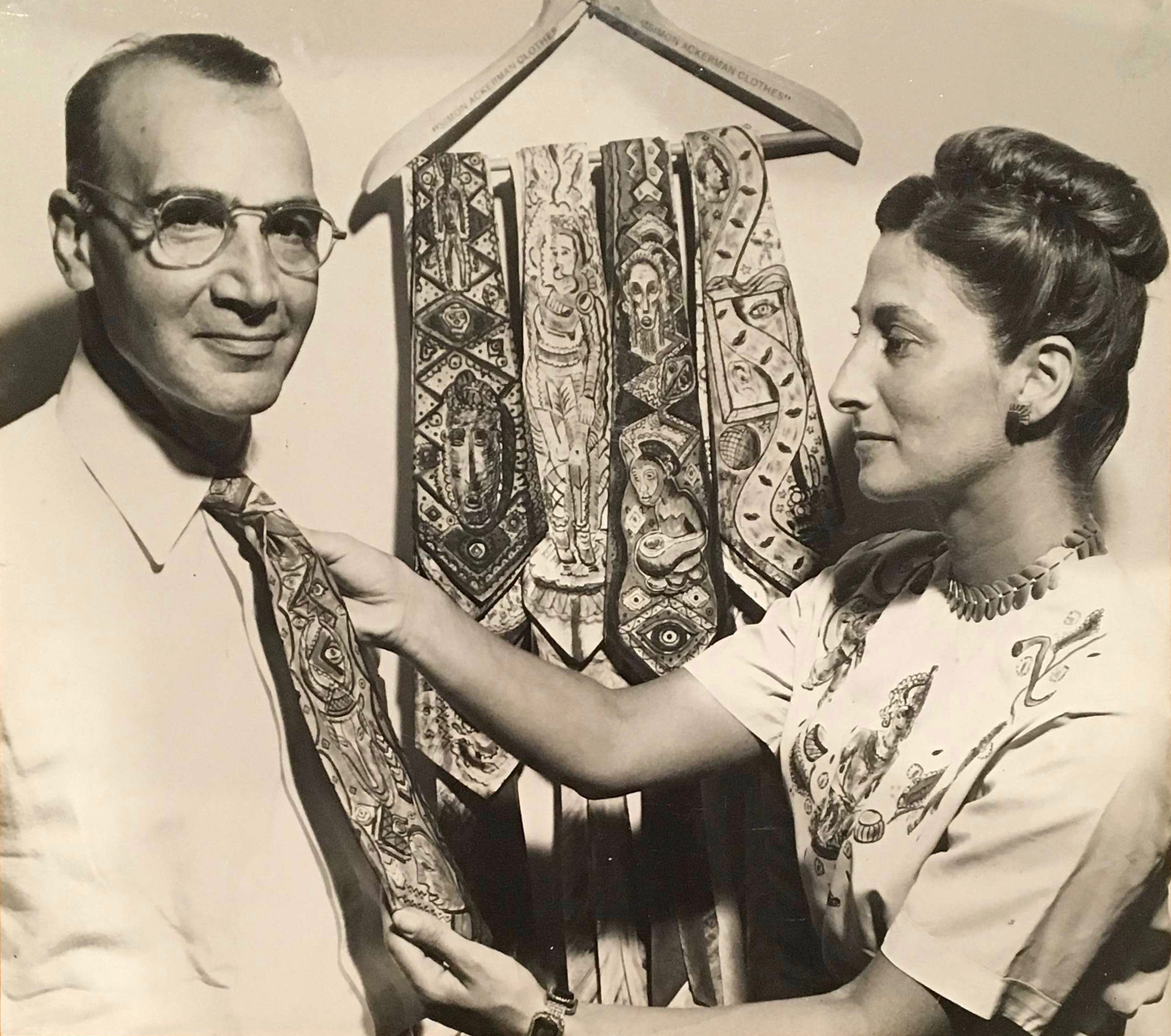
Stephen Sacklarian and wife Ayne in Philadelphia, Pennsylvania

Stephen Sacklarian (1899–1983) was an Armenian American painter and sculptor of Bulgarian Armenian descent. Although Sacklarian never formally subscribed to any official art movement, critics consider his paintings to be a blend of Modern and Abstract Expressionist, with elements of Cubism.

== Early life ==
Stephen Sacklarian was born in 1899 in Varna, Bulgaria and emigrated to the United States in 1911. His parents were Turkish Armenians who escaped persecution in Turkey from the Armenian Holocaust. Not much is known about Sacklarian’s early youth, other than he grew up in poverty in Philadelphia. He was a Golden Gloves boxer during a brief period in his late youth. Sacklarian was also missing a small part of his dominant (right) painting hand ring finger from a childhood accident, though he never claimed it a hindrance on his artistic career.

=== Pre-art career and education ===
He eventually was accepted to the Wharton School of Business, where he graduated with honors. Prior to full commitment to art, Sacklarian had a varied and financially successful career in industry and business as a sales engineer; and worked for General Electric amongst other companies. However, he later decided to formally and professionally pursue art, studying at the Pennsylvania Academy of Fine Art, the University of the Arts, the T Square Club-School for Architects, the Fleisher Memorial Art School, and ultimately in private study under sculptor Paul Manship.

== Professional career ==
=== 1930s–1950s ===
During his early career from the 1930s until the late 1950s, Sacklarian painted Realistically. Nude portraits, indoor stills and nature were predominant. Few of these early-period paintings are still around; he destroyed most of them. Sacklarian was relatively unknown in the art world during this time, not having yet found his unique painting style which for which he is associated.

=== Transition into Abstractionism (1960s) ===
In 1966, Sacklarian began painting with acrylics, which opened up new possibilities, enabling different uses of color and form which culminated in the distinct Abstractionist style for which he is known. During the late 1950s and early 1960s Sacklarian produced numerous pieces of wood sculpture, ranging from 12 inches to over 8 feet tall. His sculptures are described as "sensuous and dramatic", and with noticeable influences from African Art. Today, very few of his sculptures still exist, as he destroyed all of the known sculptures in his studio following Ayne's death.

=== Wife Ayne's death and period of destruction ===
Sacklarian was deeply affectionate toward his wife, Ayne Sacklarian (also an artist), and cited her as inspiration for the expressive joy behind his many works. However, Ayne died due to an anesthesiology error during minor surgery. Sacklarian immediately fell into a deep depression, and during this time he destroyed his studio and with it a vast majority of his works. He went through a dark period of art, then temporarily ceased painting, until resuming years later near the end of his life.

=== Late 1960s–death ===
His later works in the late 1960s and 1970s are considered to be vibrant and upbeat, more similar his earlier abstract works. Nygaard Otsby, contemporary art critic, states "Rather releasing his inner sorrows onto the canvas like other artists, Sacklarian grasps even further to channel the ecstasy that [Ayne] once gave him, finding with it a virtually unparalleled creativity in his later years."

Sacklarian visited with and was inspired by Pablo Picasso, Henry Moore, Arshile Gorky, Henri Matisse and other prominent artists of the 20th century. While he painted consistently throughout his career he and his estate hoarded most of his paintings. Sacklarian was an artist-in-residence at Notre Dame University in the 1970s. Sacklarian cites his inspiration as a difficult life and conscious choice for happiness: foremost "[His wife], both in life and death" and "centuries of Armenian oppression and wanderings" as well as his rough upbringing and brief years as a boxer, and lastly the concepts of Genesis and the 'Reality of Unreality'.

== Style ==
Sacklarian paintings are typically filled with biomorphic forms in the foreground in front of angular "room-like" backgrounds or dark color fields. Sacklarian uses perspective and composition, juxtaposing his vivid biomorphic forms in the foreground and the unidentifiable geometric rooms in which they reside. Human and animal forms, limbs, faces, and abstract sexual organs also hover in the foreground. The subconscious mind is a dominant thread in Sacklarian’s work, and his paintings are notedly dreamlike. "Some are brooding, yet most are light and full of mischievous humor. Many have sly sexual references." Sacklarian's palette varied, yet favored bright rich colors. Sacklarian claims to have at all times possessed the exact mental image of his finished works prior to initial creation.

=== Reception ===
Some critics view Sacklarian's work as an answer to the stark minimalism of Postmodern Art (see: Minimalism + Postmodern art). Art historian David W. Scott, described Sacklarian's painting forms as "emotion-charged puppets enacting dramatizations of human plights, frustrations and fears, whilst [Sacklarian] always remaining the puppeteer." Art appraiser and critic Katherine Faith Prior described Sacklarian’s work as “Gorky-esque; deeply Freudian and shamelessly Laissez-aller.”

== Death and legacy ==
Stephen Sacklarian died in 1983. He and Ayne never had children. Sacklarian's works are in the permanent collection of over 60 museums worldwide. His estate is currently managed by Leo Braudy of Capital Art Advisory.
