= Crossroads Cultural Center =

Crossroads Cultural Center is a non-profit cultural organization established in New York in 2004 at the initiative of members of Communion and Liberation, the international movement in the Roman Catholic Church that was founded in Italy by Father Luigi Giussani. Crossroads operates in the United States through local branches in New York City, Washington, DC, Boston, Massachusetts, Houston, Texas, and Clifton, New Jersey.

== Mission ==
Crossroads organizes panel discussions, debates, conferences, lectures, seminars, artistic performances and presentations, concerts and interviews which fall under one of four categories: Human Affairs, Memory and Identity, Face to Face with…, and Beauty Will Save the World.

The main interest of Crossroads Cultural Center is in the relationship between religion and culture, more specifically on the ways in which Christianity, by revealing the ultimate meaning of reality, gives new impulse to the human desire for knowledge. The goal is to offer opportunities for education, making it possible to look with openness, curiosity and critical judgment at every aspect of reality.

Crossroads ideals are summed up by the suggestion of Saint Paul: "Test everything; retain what is good." According to Crossroads Cultural Center mission statement, "the mark of a Christian culture is that it fosters interest in the full spectrum of reality, rather than focusing on a predetermined set of 'religious' issues. A sign of its authenticity is the ability, or at least the desire, to encounter people from all walks of life, and to look for and appreciate everything that is true, good and worthwhile in the various expressions of human life. These expressions include science, the arts, politics, journalism and the media, theology, history, economy, sociology, and education."

== Speakers ==
Among the speakers that have been protagonists in Crossroads events, there are Peter Beinart, Dana Gioia, Michael Novak, Anne Krueger, Paula Zahn, Paul Berman, Richard John Neuhaus, Edward Egan, Angelo Scola, Carl Anderson, Joel Meyerowitz, Seyyed Hossein Nasr, John L. Allen Jr., George Weigel, Tony Hendra, Samuel Alito, Hendrik Hertzberg, Marcello Pera, Roger Scruton and Mary Ann Glendon.

Theologian, columnist, and author Msgr. Lorenzo Albacete was the Chairman of the Crossroads Cultural Center Board of Advisors until his death in 2014.
