= Prince Regent (1811 EIC ship) =

UK East Indiaman (1811–1838)

History

United Kingdom
- Owner: EIC voyages 1-9: Henry Bonham; EIC voyage 10: Money Wigram
- Builder: Wells, Wigram & Green, Blackwall
- Cost: Cost £27 per ton = £25,651 + £432 extra
- Launched: 29 November 1811
- Fate: Broken up 1838

General characteristics
- Tons burthen: 953, or 95348/94, or 1036 (bm)
- Length: Overall: 149 ft 6 3/4 in (45.6 m); Keel: 149 ft 6 3/4 in (45.6 m)
- Beam: 38 ft 7 in (11.8 m)
- Depth of hold: 15 ft 0 in (4.6 m)
- Complement: 120
- Armament: 32 × 18-pounder guns

Prince Regent was launched at Blackwall in 1811. She made ten voyages for the British East India Company (EIC), between 1811 and 1834 to India and China. She made one more voyage to China after the end of the EIC's trading activities in 1833, and was broken up in 1838.

== Career ==
EIC voyage #1 (1812–1813): Captain Thomas Herbert Harris acquired a letter of marque on 16 January 1812. (Note: Captain Harris's previous command had been Retreat.) Captain Harris sailed from Portsmouth on 10 March 1812, bound for Madras and Bengal. Prince Regent reached Madras on 14 July and arrived at Diamond Harbour on 1 August. Homeward bound, she was at Saugor 13 October, reached St Helena on 14 February 1813, and arrived at the Downs on 14 May.

EIC voyage #2 (1814–1815): Captain Harris sailed from Portsmouth on 10 May 1814, bound for Madras, Bengal, and the Moluccas. Prince Regent reached Madras on 16 September and was at Saugor on 23 October. On 10 November she sailed for Amboinya collect the year’s spice harvest and transport it to London.

On 3 February 1815 she reached Amboina. She visited Banda on 20 February, returning to Amboina on 14 March. Homeward bound she reached St Helena on 12 June and arrived at the Downs on 19 August.

EIC voyage #3 (1816–1817): Captain Harris sailed from the Downs on 17 April 1816, bound for Madras and Bengal. Prince Regent reached Madras on 27 July, and arrived at the New Anchorage on 29 August. Homeward bound, she was at Saugor on 17 December, reached the Cape on 17 February 1817 and St Helena on 8 March, and arrived at the Downs on 6 May.

EIC voyage #4 (1818–1819): Captain Harris sailed from Portsmouth on 31 March 1818, bound for Madras and Bengal. Prince Regent reached Madras on 9 July, and arrived at the New Anchorage on 11 August. Homeward bound, she was in the Eastern Channel on 18 December. She reached the Cape on 1 February 1819 and St Helena on 20 February, and arrived at the Downs on 4 May.

EIC voyage #5 (1820–1821): On 28 February 1828 Prince Regent, Captain John Innes, grounded on the South Shore, at Gravesend, Kent, near Pitcher's Dock; she was on her way to Madras and Bengal, and it was expected that she would be got off on the next tide. Captain Innes sailed from Portsmouth on 9 March 1820, bound for Madras and China. Prince Regent reached Madras on 29 June, Penang on 14 August, and Malacca on 31 August. She arrived at Whampoa Anchorage on 25 September. Homeward bound, she crossed the Second Bar on 14 January 1821, reached the Cape on 24 March and St Helena on 15 April, and arrived at the Downs on 10 June.

EIC voyage #6 (1822–1823): Captain Innes sailed from the Downs on 14 May 1822, bound for Madras and Bengal. Prince Regent reached Madras on 26 August and arrived at the New Anchorage on 11 September. Homeward bound, she was at Saugor on 27 December, reached the Cape on 27 February 1823 and St Helena on 14 March, and arrived at the Downs on 11 May.

On 30 July 1823 the EIC chartered Prince Regent from Henry Bonham for three more voyages at a rate of £19 ៛6s 6d per ton for 958 tons.

EIC voyage #7 (1824–1825): Captain Henry Hosmer sailed from the Downs on 23 June 1824, bound for Bengal. Prince Regent arrived at Diamond Harbour on 9 October. Homeward bound, she was at Saugor on 9 January 1825, reached St Helena of 30 April, and arrived at the Downs on 7 June.

EIC voyage #8 (1826–1827): Captain Henry Hosmer sailed from the Downs on 17 May 1826, bound for Madras and Bengal. Prince Regent reached Madras on 30 August, and arrived at Diamond Harbour on 24 September. Homeward bound, she was at Saugor on 2 December, reached St Helena on 6 April 1827, and arrived at the Downs on 22 May.

EIC voyage #9 (1828–1829): Captain Hosmer sailed from the Downs on 13 May 1828, bound for Madras and Bengal. Prince Regent reached Madras on 9 September and arrived at Diamond Harbour on 6 October. Homeward bound, she was at Saugor on 16 January 1829, reached St Helena on 28 April, and arrived at the Downs on 17 June.

On 28 September 1830 Wigram's & Green purchased Prince Regent, at sea, for £6,500. On 12 September 1831 the EIC chartered Prince Regent from Green, Wigram, and Green for £12 4s 6d per ton for 1036 tons for one voyage, out and back.

EIC voyage #10 (1833–1834): Captain Richard Aplin sailed from the Downs on 14 April 1833, bound for China.Price Regent reached Penang on 31 August and arrived at Whampoa on 26 September. Homeward bound, she crossed the Second Bar on 17 January 1834, reached St Helena on 29 March, and arrived back in the Downs on 17 May.

There was one last charter of Prince Regent as a "dismantled ship" on 29 July 1832. The EIC chartered her from Messrs. Wigram for a voyage to Chia and return at a rate of £14 9s 6d per ton for 992 tons.

On 14 March 1833 Prince Regent, Captain Richard Aplin, sailed from London, bound for China. He arrived back in London on 18 May 1834.

The EIC gave up its commercial and shipping activities in 1833.

== Fate ==
In 1838, Prince Regent was sold for breaking up.
