= Royal George (1803 ship) =

History

United Kingdom
- Name: Royal George
- Operator: Revenue Service
- Builder: Cowes
- Launched: 1803
- Fate: Sold 1806

United Kingdom
- Name: HMS Bustard
- Namesake: Bustard
- Acquired: 1806 by purchase
- Commissioned: 12 April 1808
- Out of service: paid off in 1815
- Honours and awards: Naval General Service Medal with clasp "29 July Boat Service 1809"
- Fate: Sold 1815

United Kingdom
- Name: Royal George
- Acquired: 1815 by purchase
- Fate: Lost 1825

General characteristics
- Type: Brig-sloop
- Tons burthen: 227, or 270 (bm)
- Complement: 95 (Royal Navy)
- Armament: 14 × 18-pounder carronades + 2 × 6-pounder chase guns

Royal George was launched in 1803 as a brig for the Revenue Service. The Royal Navy purchased her in 1806 and renamed her HMS Bustard. She served on active duty between 1808 and 1815, distinguishing herself in operations in the Mediterranean. She then sailed to the West Indies. The Royal Navy sold her in 1815 and she became the whaler Royal George. She made three whaling voyages and was lost in 1825 on her fourth.

== Royal Navy ==
The Revenue brig Royal George was launched at Cowes in 1803. The Royal Navy purchased her in 1806 and she arrived at Portsmouth on 11 June. The Navy renamed her Bustard. She underwent fitting there between March 1808 and 27 June 1808. Commander John Duff Markland commissioned her on 12 April 1808 for the Downs. On 21 February 1809 he sailed her for the Mediterranean. In 1809-1810 Bustard was part of a squadron operating in the gulf of Venice and coast of Calabria. On 28 July 1809, the British observed an enemy convoy sailing along the northern coast towards Trieste. The 74-gun HMS Excellent forced the convoy to shelter at Duino. At midnight boats from the squadron pushed inshore. Bustard and Acorn provided support, with Bustard leading the way into a little-known anchorage. The British captured and brought out six Italian gunboats and ten 10-20 ton (bm) trabaccolos or coasters. Each of three of the gunboats carried a 24-pounder gun; these vessels were of 80 tons (bm). The other three gunboats, each of 60 tons (bm), each carried an 18-pounder. One coaster sank, but only after her captors had succeeded in removing her cargo of flour. The other coasters were carrying brandy, flour, rice, and wheat. Bustard had one man mortally wounded ant three others wounded. The Italians lost three officers captured (two of whom had been wounded), and 15 seamen and soldiers captured, one of whom later died. (Note: Head money for the crews of the six gunboats was paid on 6 January 1825. A first-class share was worth £39 7s 4¼d; a sixth-class share, that of an ordinary seaman, was worth 5s 9¼d.) In 1847 the Navy awarded the Naval General Service Medal with clasp "29 July Boat Service 1809" to all the remaining participants in the action.

On 17 May 1810 Bustard captured the French privateer corvette Minerve. Minerve was pierced for 18 guns but only mounting two.

During July to September, Commander Markland commanded the sloops stationed at the Faro of Messina (Strait of Messina), to protect Sicily against invasion by Marat's army of 40,000 men encamped on the opposite shore.

In June 1810, boats from Bustard and Volage, under Markland's command, Bustard, entered a port a few miles south of Cortone. There they destroyed 25 vessels carrying stores and provisions for Joachim Murat's army in Sicily.

On 23 July Bustard and Halcyon destroyed two armed feluccas at "Contessa" (probably Concessa}), under Cape del Arme. The feluccas' crews, some soldiers, and the local peasantry defended the two vessels for some time.

During Markland's time in the Strait of Messina Bustard continually engaged Murat's shore batteries and flotilla. Eventually Murat had to give up his plan to invade Sicily and he returned to Naples.

On 31 January 1811 Markland transferred to HMS Eclair. During his time with Bustard he had captured 25 prizes and destroyed 39 vessels.

Commander Charles Burrough Strong assumed command of Bustard on 14 March. He sailed for the Leeward Islands on 3 April 1813. Bustard was one of the escorts to a convoy that had left Cork bound for the West Indies and the Brazils.

On 14 March 1814 Bustard, Eclipse, and Echo captured the schooner Ann and sent her into St Thomas.

Bustard returned to Portsmouth from the West Indies on 21 August 1814. Commander James Augustus Seymour Crighton was appointed to Bustard on 3 September. She then escorted convoys to Spain, Portugal, and the south of France. Crighton transferred to Ringdove on 14 November.

Commander Lord John Hay took command on 15 November 1814. In December Bustard had completed refitting and was ready for sea. She then escorted a convoy to Lisbon and returned to Portsmouth by mid-January 1815. Bustard was paid off in 1815.

Disposal: The "Principal Officers and Commissioners of His Majesty's Royal Navy" offered "Bustard, brig, of 270 tons", lying at Portsmouth, for sale on 12 October 1815. She sold there on that date for £720.

== Whaler ==
The shipowners William and Daniel Bennett purchased Royal George in 1816. She first appeared in Lloyd's Register in 1816 with W. Buckle, master, Bennett & Co., owners, and trade London–South Seas.

1st whaling voyage (1816–1818): Captain Richard Buckle sailed from London in 1816, bound for the waters off Peru. Royal George returned on 9 June 1818 with 450 casks of whale oil.

2nd whaling voyage (1818–1821): Captain Buckle sailed from London on 17 July 1818, bound for the waters off Peru. Royal George returned on 15 April 1821 with 520 casks of whale oil.

3rd whaling voyage (1821–1823): Captain Buckle sailed from London on 10 June 1821, bound for the waters off Peru. Royal George returned on 30 September 1823 with 550 casks of whale oil.

Lloyd's Register (1823) showed Royal George's master changing from W. Buckley to J. Barney.

== Fate ==
Captain David Burney (or Barney), sailed from London on 12 January 1824, bound for the seas off Japan and for the Sandwich Islands. Royal George was lost on 9 April 1825 at Woohoo (Oahu). She was carrying 600 barrels of whale oil at the time.
