= HMS Cockatrice (1781) =

Fourth of the Alert-class class of British Royal Navy cutters

History

Great Britain
- Name: HMS Cockatrice
- Namesake: The Cockatrice
- Ordered: 11 April 1780
- Builder: Thomas King, Dover
- Laid down: c.May 1780
- Launched: 3 July 1781
- Out of service: April 1793
- Fate: Sold 1802

United Kingdom
- Name: HMhb Cockatrice
- Acquired: August 1804 by contract
- Fate: Returned to owners 1808

United Kingdom
- Name: Cockatrice
- Owner: 1809:Wright; 1810:Miller & Co.; 1815:Goldie & Co.
- Fate: Condemned at Lisbon c.May 1816

General characteristics (Note: Dimensions are for the cutter.)
- Class & type: HMS:Alert-class cutter; HMhb:Brig
- Tons burthen: HMS: 1813/94 (bm); HMhb: 18392/94, or 195 (bm); Merchantman:200 (bm)
- Length: 69 ft 4 in (21.1 m) (overall); 52 ft 0 in (15.8 m) (keel)
- Beam: 25 ft 7 in (7.8 m)
- Depth of hold: 10 ft 9 in (3.3 m)
- Propulsion: Sails
- Complement: HMS:55 (later 70); HMhb:45
- Armament: HMS: Initially:10 × 4-pounder guns + 12 × ½-pounder swivel guns; Later:14 × 12-pounder carronades; HMhb:12 × 18-pounder carronades; Merchantman:12 guns

HMS Cockatrice was the fourth of the Alert-class British Royal Navy cutters. She was launched in 1781 and had an uneventful career until the Navy sold her in 1802. Private interests purchased her, lengthened her, and changed her rig to that of a brig. They hired her out to the Navy and she was in service as a hired armed brig from 1806 to 1808. She then returned to mercantile service until she was condemned at Lisbon in May 1816 as not worth repairing.

== Royal Navy cutter ==
The Navy commissioned Cockatrice for home waters in August 1781. In August 1782 she was under the command of Lieutenant C. Bartholomew, in home waters. She was paid off in 1782 or 1783. She was then recommissioned in May 1783 under the command of Lieutenant William Reynolds off the Isle of Wight. She was paid off in 1786 but in October she was recommissioned under the command of Lieutenant C. Hummer (or GGeorge Hume). She was again paid off in 1789.

From 1790 to 1793, Lieutenant Walter Locke commanded Cockatrice in the Channel. On 28 May 1790 she arrived at Portsmouth with 90 impressed men.

In February 1793 Lieutenant John Clements took command. On 9 March Cockatrice sent a Dutch hoy, of about 200 tons, into Poole. The hoy had been sailing from Genoa to Havre. Cockatrice also sent into Portsmouth a French brig carrying wine and salt.

Disposal: The Navy paid Cockatrice off in April 1793 and placed her in ordinary at Portsmouth. She sat there until she sank at her moorings in 1801. The Navy refloated her. Then the "Principal Officers and Commissioners of His Majesty's Navy" offered "Cockatrice Cutter, 181 Tons, Copper-bottomed, lying at Portsmouth", for sale on 9 September 1802.

== Hired armed vessel ==
Private interests purchased her, increased her burthen from 181 to 195 tons by cutting her in half and lengthening her, and changed her rig to that of a brig. The Admiralty hired her and she commenced service as His Majesty's hired brig (HMhb) Cockatrice on 6 August 1804.

In 1804 she was under the command of Lieutenant Nicholas Kemp (or Kempe) when on 18 June she came into Portsmouth with a convoy from the Downs, and on 22 June sailed with a convoy for the westward. On 2 October she escorted the recaptured West Indiaman William Heathcote into Liverpool.

Later, on 10 January 1805, Cockatrice recaptured the brig Padgey. Padgey had been sailing from Cardiff to London when a privateer captured her near Land's End. Cockatrice sent her into Penzance.

On 20 February Kempe and Cockatrice detained Flora. Flora, Klyn, master, had been sailing from Bilbao to Emden when Cockatrice intercepted her and sent her into the Motherbank.

In 1806 Cockatrice was under the command of P. Greene. According to Ccckatrice's log book, Greene was Pitt Burnaby Greene, and he took command on 6 April 1805. During his tenure Cockatrice patrolled and escorted convoys, but did not capture any prizes. On 30 March 1806, Burnaby Greene was off Ireland with orders to take on board the Earl of Hardwicke, Lord Lieutenant of Ireland (1801-1805). Burnaby Greene left Cockatrice in February 1807, moving to take command of HMS Foxhound.

In 1807 J. B. Balderston took command of Cockatrice. On 27 and 28 August in the run-up to the British attack on Copenhagen the Royal Navy embargoed three Danish vessels then at Plymouth: Elizabeth, Tiesco, and Aurora. (Note: All of the naval vessels stationed at Plymouth shared in the prize money. A lieutenant's share was 5s 6d; a seaman's share was 2½d.) Also on 28 August Cockatrice and Amazon were in company at the capture of the Danish ship Speculation and so shared in the prize money for her. Two days later Plover and Cockatrice were in company for the detention of the Danish ship George, and the Danish vessels Die Perle and Fortuna.

In 1808 William Balfour replaced Balderston. He wrote to his uncle and some of his letters were later published. He described her as a leaky and that she should be taken out of service. He reported that the owners had hired her out for 15s/month/ton (or £1795 per annum, based on a burthen of 195 tons). The owners also had agreed to provide 45 men at a rate of £5 10s each, per month. However, Balfour further reported that the owners were rarely able to provide half that many. At the time of writing, Cockatrice had a crew of 30 including Balfour and his servant. Lastly, Balfour reported that it was his understanding that Balderston had, in his 16 months in command, amassed some £2000 in prize money.

Cockatrice's contract ended in 1808. There is no readily available record of her having taken any prizes during Balfour's term in command.

== Merchantman ==
The brig Cockatrice, of 200 tons (bm), entered Lloyd's Register in 1809 with Wright, owner, changing to Miller & Co., voyage London to Liverpool, changing to Liverpool-Hayti, with E. Crosbie, master.

In 1810 her master was still E. Crosbie, but changing to J. Young. Her owner was Miller & Co., and her trade Liverpool-Hayti (changing to Africa). In mid-December 1809 Cockatrice, Crosby, master, from "Hayti", put into Yarmouth having lost her foretopmast and bowsprit.

In October 1810 Cockatrice took two representatives of the King of Ashantee back to Accra from Cape Coast Castle.

On 22 April 1813, Cockatrice, Carteheon, master, arrived at Barbados. HMS Sceptre had detained her and Wasp, Archer, master, for carrying unlicensed arms and ammunition, and sent them into Barbados for adjudication. The authorities quickly released Cockatrice, Caithcheon, master, and by 3 May she was off Cape Tiburoon (Cape Tiburón, Colombia).

In 1815 Cockatrice, A. Fullerton, master (changing to Kirkpatrick), Goldie & Co., owner, was engaged in the London-San Domingo trade (changing to Liverpool-Africa).

== Fate ==
On 7 March 1816, Cockatrice, Kirkpatrick, master, from Gorée to Liverpool, put into Lisbon in a very leaky state. After a survey, the surveyors reported that she was so "strained and shaken" as to be unworthy of repair.
