= Clothier (1800 ship) =

History

Great Britain
- Name: Clothier
- Builder: Barmouth
- Launched: 1800
- Captured: March 1807; burnt

General characteristics
- Tons burthen: 127 (bm)
- Sail plan: Brig

Clothier was a brig launched at Barmouth in 1800. A French privateer captured and burnt her in March 1807.

Clothier first appeared in Lloyd's Register (LR) in (1800).

| Year | Master | Owner | Trade | Source |
|---|---|---|---|---|
| 1800 | D.Edward | Captain & Co. | Liverpool–Hamburg | LR |
| 1804 | Edwards | Lloyd & Co. | Liverpool–London | LR |
| 1807 | Edwards | Lloyd & Co. | Liverpool–Dublin | LR |

In March 1807 the French privateer General Perpignon captured and burnt Clothier, Edwards, master, off Rochefort. Clothier was a victualer serving the British blockading squadron.
