= HMS Foxhound (1806) =

Brig-sloop of the Royal Navy

- Foxhound

History

United Kingdom
- Name: HMS Foxhound
- Namesake: Foxhound
- Builder: King, Dover
- Launched: 1806
- Commissioned: May 1807
- Honors and awards: Naval General Service Medal with the clasp "Basque Roads 1809"
- Fate: Foundered 31 August 1809

General characteristics
- Class & type: Cruizer-class brig-sloop
- Tons burthen: 38426/94 (bm)
- Length: Overall:100 ft 0 in (30.5 m); Keel:77 ft 2 7/8 in (23.5 m)
- Beam: 30 ft 7 in (9.3 m)
- Draught: Uladen:7 ft 0 in (2.1 m); Laden:11 ft 0 in (3.4 m)
- Depth of hold: 12 ft 9 in (3.9 m)
- Sail plan: Brig
- Complement: 121
- Armament: 16 × 32-pounder carronades; 2 × 6-pounder chase guns

HMS Foxhound was an 18-gun Cruizer-class brig-sloop built by King at Dover and launched in 1806. She participated in the battle of the Basque Roads in early 1809 and foundered later that year.

== Service ==
Commander Pitt Burnaby Greene, late commander of the hired armed brig Cockatrice, commissioned Foxhound in May 1807. On 26 August Foxhound captured the Danish vessel Adetheid Margaretha. Two days later she captured the Danish vessels Gimlé and De Gode.

On 28 June 1808 Foxhound captured the French chasse maree Susanne. Then on 11 January 1809 Foxhound recaptured the Hamburg ship Vierininguen.

On 17 March 1809, Foxhound joined Admiral Lord Gambier's Channel fleet anchored off the Basque Roads. The British plan was to use the 60 vessels (of all kinds) to attack the French fleet lying within. The 15 French vessels there, commanded by Vice-Admiral Zacharie Allemand, lay behind a boom protected by 30 guns.

During this time Foxhound participated in the capture of two vessels, the Danish ship Neptunus on 24 March and the French ship Nymphe on 28 March. For the capture of Neptunus, Foxhound was in company with Indefatigable and the sloop Goldfinch. Foxhound was also in company with Indefatigable for the capture of Nymphe.

On 11 April, two explosion ships, twelve fire ships, accompanied by bomb vessels and escorted by men-of-war, some 27 vessels in all, under the command of Captain Lord Cochrane, broke the boom under a heavy fire. Foxhound covered the bomb vessel Aetna near the Île-d'Aix, which was making a diversionary attack. The British main attack captured two French vessels and two were blown up, all with a total loss to the British of only eight men killed and 24 wounded. Still, Cochrane was highly critical of Gambier's failure to act more aggressively. (Gambier had earlier objected to the plan to use explosion (Cochrane's invention) and fire ships, calling it "a horrible and anti-Christian mode of warfare".)

Two of Foxhound's sister ships, Doterel and Beagle were also present at the Basque Roads. In 1847 the Admiralty awarded the then-surviving participants in the battle the Naval General Service Medal with the clasp "Basque Roads 1809".

In 1809 Commander James Mackenzie replaced Greene. On 16 May Foxhound sailed for Quebec with a convoy.

== Fate ==
While still under Mackenzie's command, Foxhound was returning from Halifax when she foundered in the Atlantic with the loss of all on board. The loss occurred in August, and perhaps on 31 August 1809. The vessels in company were unable to render any assistance.
