= HMS Eclipse (1807) =

Brig-sloop of the Royal Navy

- Eclipse

History

United Kingdom
- Name: HMS Eclipse
- Ordered: 1 October 1806
- Builder: Thomas King, Dover
- Laid down: December 1806
- Launched: 4 August 1807
- Fate: Sold on 31 August 1815

United Kingdom
- Name: Eclipse
- Owner: Various
- Acquired: 1815 by purchase
- Fate: Leaves Lloyd's Register c.1838; last recorded voyage ends June 1845.

General characteristics
- Class & type: Cruizer-class brig-sloop
- Tons burthen: 38426/94, or 3919/94 (bm)
- Length: 100 ft 0 in (30.5 m) (gundeck); 77 ft 2 7/8 in (23.5 m) (keel)
- Beam: 30 ft 7 in (9.3 m)
- Depth of hold: 12 ft 9 in (3.9 m)
- Sail plan: Brig
- Armament: 16 × 32-pounder carronades + 2 × 6-pounder chase guns

HMS Eclipse was a Royal Navy Cruizer-class brig-sloop built by John King at Dover and launched in 1807. She served off Portugal and then in the Indian Ocean at the capture of the Île de France. Shortly thereafter she captured Tamatave. She was sold for mercantile service in 1815. She traded with India until 1823. Then between 1823 and 1845 she made seven voyages as a whaler.

== Naval service ==
Eclipse entered naval service in September 1807 under Commander John Douglas. In December Captain George A. Creyke took command immediately sailed her for the Portuguese coast on 2 January 1808. There Eclipse observed the seizure of Porto by the French and the subsequent uprising that led to the First Battle of Porto. Creyke rescued several of the French administrators from death at the hands of the populace by taking the administrators prisoner. He also mounted cannon on a Brazilian ship in the harbour to create a floating battery, under a British officer, to defend a bridge, should the French advance.

On 26 February 1808 Eclipse was in company with Blossom when they captured the Sally and Hetty, William Fleming, Master. Then on 3 March Eclipse sailed for the Leeward Islands. On 7 March Nymphe, with Eclipse and Blossom in company, captured the Hetty.

On 29 May 1808 she captured the American ship Romeo. It is not clear on what grounds she seized the American vessel, but prize money was awarded.

Prior to 4 February 1810 she recaptured Unanimity. (Note: Unanimity had been sailing from Porto to Leith when the French privateer General Perignon had captured her. Unanimity arrived at Plymouth on 4 February. HMS Amazon had captured General Perignon on 21 January.) That same day, she and Dryad also recaptured Dobridge and Hercules. Hercules, Duncan, master, which had been sailing from Malta to London when she was captured on 3 February, came into Plymouth on 8 February.

Command then passed to George Henderson who sailed Eclipse to the Indian Ocean, leaving on 16 June. There she joined the squadron that successfully prepared and launched the Invasion of Île de France in December 1810. (Note: The Admiral's share of the prize money was £2650 5s 2d. A first-class share was worth £278 19s 5 3/4d; a sixth-class share, that of an ordinary seaman, was worth £3 7s 6 1/4d. A fourth and final payment was made in July 1828. A first-class share was worth £29 19s 5 1/4d; a sixth-class share was worth 8s 2 1/2d. This time, Bertie received £314 14s 3 1/2d.)

Henderson was subsequently promoted to command the frigate Nereide, and Eclipse remained in the Indian Ocean. From December on she was under the command of Commander Henry Lynne. (Note: On taking command he was an acting commander, but he was confirmed in the rank in April 1811.)

Eclipse arrived at Tamatave, Madagascar, on 17 February 1811 with a detachment of soldiers of the 22nd Regiment of Foot as the British were desirous of occupying the area as it was a source of provisions and cattle for Île de France, which they were about to attack. HMS Duchess of York was in company with Eclipse and also carrying troops. They landed their troops, and Duchess of York took off the French garrison. The next day the troops of the 22nd Regiment and of the Bourbon rifle corps, having taken Tamatave, also took Foule Point, the last French settlements on the east coast of Madagascar. However, a sudden wind parted Duchess of York from her anchor. She was seen going down in deep water and observers believed that she had struck a rock. All aboard were lost.

Somewhere around this time Eclipse reportedly captured a French letter of marque brig with dispatches. In 1811 she also captured the Maria Louisa, and recaptured Donna Emilia, with Racehorse in company.

By March Eclipse was under the command of Commander W. Steed. By agreement, Eclipse and Nisus shared in the prize money for the capture of the Renommée on 20 May 1811 at the Battle of Tamatave, and one week later of the Néréide.

On 5 January 1812 Eclipse, again with Racehorse in company, took the lugger Eliza with 145 slaves, which she sent to the Cape of Good Hope. Around February Harpy arrived from the Cape of Good Hope to relieve Eclipse.

On 9 September 1812 Eclipse arrived in Portsmouth from the Cape of Good Hope. She sailed for the Leeward Islands on 6 February 1813. There she captured the American brig Olive Branch, of Connecticut, and sent her into St Vincents.

Eclipse was in company with Swaggerer when, on 13 March 1814, they captured the brigantine Admiral Martin, which they sent in to Antigua. On 14 March Eclipse, Bustard, and Echo captured the schooner Ann and sent her into St Thomas.

Disposal: In 1815 Eclipse was laid up at Woolwich. On 24 January the Admiralty offered her for sale and on 31 August she was sold there for £1,400 for mercantile use.

== Commercial service ==
E. Burford purchased her on 31 August 1831. Lloyd's Register for 1816 shows an Eclipse, Dover-built, nine years old, and 391 tons (bm). This vessel continued in commercial service for a number of years.

She appears to have traded with India until 1823 when William and Daniel Bennett purchased her for use as a whaler. (Note: There is a report that she was wrecked in 1832 at La Palma, but the vessel that wrecked is clearly a different Eclipse)

=== Whaler ===
From 1823 on Eclipse made seven voyages as a whaler, the last one ending in June 1846.

On her first whaling voyage, Eclipse, Duncan, master, left on 11 April 1823 bound for the Brazil Banks. (Note: The Brazil Banks are the edge of the continental shelf to the east and south of latitude 16°S of the coast of South America.) She was reported to be whaling at San Blas on 6 August 1824. ("San Blas" may have been San Blas, Nayarit, Mexico.) Lloyd's List for 21 September reported that Eclipse had been lost on the Tre Maria Islands. She had last been reported "all well" on 15 April going into "San Blas" with 820 barrels of oil. The September report came from her bosun and four crew members who had deserted in one of her boats. However, by 16 November she was reported to be "all well" and heading to San Blas with 820 barrels. Between 17 August and 3 September she was at Honolulu with 200 barrels. Eclipse returned on 15 February 1826 with 480 casks.

On her second whaling voyage, Duncan left Britain on 25 June 1826, bound for Timor. She was reported in the Banda Sea on 9 February 1827 with 300 barrels. In October she was at Guam. She returned to Britain in 1828 with 650 casks.

Duncan sailed Eclipse on her third voyage, about which nothing is known beyond that she left Britain on 26 October 1828.

Captain King sailed Eclipse on her fourth whaling voyage, leaving Britain on 15 February 1831. She was reported to be at Tongatabu on 7 March 1832 with 550 barrels. The next report had her at St Helena on 4 April 1834 on her way to London. She arrived with 550 barrels.

Eclipse left on her fifth whaling voyage 9 July 1834, with Allen, master. She was reported to have been clean (i.e., not yet to have taken any whales), on 15 May 1835. By 9 December 1836 she had 1900 barrels. On 16 June 1837 she was at St Helena with 2000 barrels. She arrived back in Britain on 23 August 1837 with 2000 barrels [full].

It is not clear when Eclipse, Allen, master, left Britain on her sixth whaling voyage. On 4 January 1838 she was reported at 4°N 24°W. She was reported to have been at Timor with 120 barrels, and then after 20 months out to have collected 1000 barrels. In June 1840 she was again at Timor, with 1800 barrels. She arrived in Britain on 14 March 1841 with 1800 barrels [incomplete].

For her seventh and last recorded whaling voyage, Eclipse, Hay, master, left Britain on 25 September 1841. In April 1844 she was in the China sea. By 26 May she was at Manila. On 22 January 1845 she had 1200 barrels. On 7 March Eclipse was at the Cape of Good Hope with 1600 barrels. She returned to Britain on 7 June 1845 with 1500 barrels [incomplete].

=== Lloyd's Register ===
Year	Master	Owner	Trade	Notes
1816	Burford	Burford	London-Bengal	
1817				Lloyd's Register not available
1818	Burford	Burford	London-Bengal	
1819	Winter; Stewart	Burford	London-Bengal	
1820	C. Stewart	M. Boyd	London-India	
1821	J. Stewart	M. Boyd	London-India	
1822	J. Stewart	M. Boyd	London-India	
1823	J. Stewart; Duncan	M. Boyd	London-India; London-South Seas	
1824	Duncan	Bennett & Co.	London-South Seas	
1825				No entry
1826	J. Duncan	Bennett & Co.	London-South Seas	
1827	J. Duncan	Bennett & Co.	London-South Seas	
1828	J. Duncan	Bennett & Co.	London-South Seas	
1829	J. Duncan	Bennett & Co.	London-South Seas	
1830	J. Duncan	Bennett & Co.	London-South Seas	
1831	J. Duncan; J. King	Bennett & Co.	London-South Seas	
1832	J. King	Bennett & Co.	London-South Seas	
1833	J. King	Bennett & Co.	London-South Seas	
1834	J. King			Port: London

The last year for a Lloyd's Register listing for Eclipse is 1833. In 1834 there is an abbreviated entry for an Eclipse, of London, of 401 tons (bm). This listing continues until 1838. That is the last mention of the vessel. After 1838, Lloyd's Register only carried vessels that had been surveyed.
