= Paragon (1801 ship) =

History

United Kingdom
- Name: Paragon
- Launched: 1801, Lancaster
- Fate: Last listed 1830

General characteristics
- Tons burthen: 295, or 308 (bm)
- Complement: 1803:20; 1804:20; 1805:20; 1807:20
- Armament: 1802:14 × 9-pounder guns + 6 × 24-pounder carronades; 1803:14 × 4&6-pounder guns; 1804:14 × 4&6-pounder guns; 1805:14 × 4&6-pounder guns; 1807:10 × 9-pounder guns; 1814:2 × 12-pounder carronades

Paragon was launched at Lancaster in 1801, or 1800. She traded across the Atlantic with the West Indies, South America, and North America. She captured one French vessel, and was herself captured, but swiftly recaptured by the Royal Navy. She was last listed in 1830, but with stale data from 1825.

== Career ==
Paragon entered Lloyd's Register in 1801, with W. Hart, master, Ridley, owner, and trade London–Demerara. After the resumption of war with France, Captain William Hart acquired a letter of marque on 20 June 1803.

On 25 July 1803, Paragon, of Lancaster, Hart, master, while south of the Azores, captured the polacre Harmonie, Peter Paul Boniface, master, at 35°10′N 23°16′W. Harmonie, of 238 tons (bm), had been sailing from New Orleans to Marseilles with a cargo 307 bales of cotton, 20 bales of buffalo hides, 985 CWT of "Campeachy wood", and other cargo. Paragon sent her into Lancaster. On this voyage, while off Barbados, Paragon repelled an attack by a French schooner of 12 guns and 100 men.

On 12 October 1804 Captain Paul Redmayne acquired a letter of marque. Captain William Hart acquired a letter of marque on 2 October 1805.

Lloyd's List reported on 10 June 1806 that Paragon had gone on shore at Berbice. She had then go into Demerara to unload, having lost her rudder.

On 4 August 1807, Captain Robert Millar acquired a letter of marque. This letter of marque gave Paragon's burthen as 308 tons. Lloyd's Register for 1807, showed Paragon's master changing from W. Hart to R. Millar, her owner from Ridley to Robinson, and her trade from London–Demerara to Greenock–Halifax, Nova Scotia. From Greenock she also sailed to New York City and to Demerara. In 1809 her master and owner changed to Forsyth.

Year	Master	Owner	Trade	Source
1810	Forsyth	Forsyth	Greenock–Demerara	Register of Shipping (RS)
1812	Forsyth	Holt	Liverpool–Lisbon	RS

Paragon, Clint, master and part-owner, was sailing from Liverpool to Buenos Aires, in company with William, Gell, master, when on 3 April 1813, they encountered the American privateer Grand Turk at 27°S 40°W. Grand Turk was armed with 16 guns and had a crew of 130 men. An engagement ensued that lasted 17 minutes before the two British merchantmen struck. William had suffered two men killed and six men wounded. Grand Turk put a prize crew of 17 men aboard Paragon.

HMS Tenedos recaptured Paragon near Boston, and Paragon arrived at Halifax on 2 June. William remained a prize and arrived at Salem on 30 May. A great wind struck Halifax on 12 November, sinking or damaging many ships. One of these was the "ship Paragon", which had been driven ashore, lost her mizzenmast, and had her upper works greatly damaged. Lloyd's Register for 1814 had the annotations "captured" by her name.

Year	Master	Owner	Trade	Source & notes
1814	J. Clint; D. Steward	Kernso	Liverpool–Brazils	LR;

The Register of Shipping for 1815 showed Paragon with Stewart, master, Collins, owner, and trade London–Halifax. It also noted that she had undergone repairs in 1814.

On 21 August Paragon, Stuart, master, sailed from Portsmouth for Halifax. The transport Alexander arrived at Plymouth from Halifax on 25 October. On her way she had encountered Paragon at 47°33′N 37°0′W. Paragon was on her way to Halifax but had been dismasted and was "in great distress". Alexander rendered assistance and parted on 14 October. Paragon, Stewart, master, arrived at Halifax on 5 November, having come via Newfoundland.

Year	Master	Owner	Trade	Source & notes
1815	D. Steward	Collins	London–Halifax	Register of Shipping (RS); damages repaired in 1814
1820	W. Hide; G. Smith	Capt. & Co.	London–Grenada; Exmouth–Quebec	Lloyd's Register (LR); large repair 1817

On 23 July, Friendship, Weeks, master, had to put into Exmouth with damage. Paragon, Smith, master, had run into her as Paragon was coming from America.

Paragon, Smith, master was entering Shields Harbour when she ran aground on the Herd Sand on 4 November 1821. She was later refloated and taken in to South Shields. She underwent a large repair in 1821.

== Fate ==
Paragon was last listed in the Register of Shipping in 1825 with trade London coaster. She was last listed in Lloyd's Register in 1830 with trade London–Newcastle. Information in Lloyd's Register was stale, having shown no change relative to 1825.
