= Queen Charlotte (1801 Calcutta ship) =

India-built UK merchant ship 1801–1804

History

United Kingdom
- Name: Queen Charlotte
- Launched: 1801, Calcutta
- Fate: Lost circa 1804

General characteristics
- Tons burthen: 330, or 335 (bm)

Queen Charlotte was launched at Calcutta in 1801. In 1803 her master was R. Alexander and her owners were Colvins, Bazett and Co. She was lost in the Bay of Bengal around 1804.
