= David H. Scott =

American geologist

David Holcomb Scott
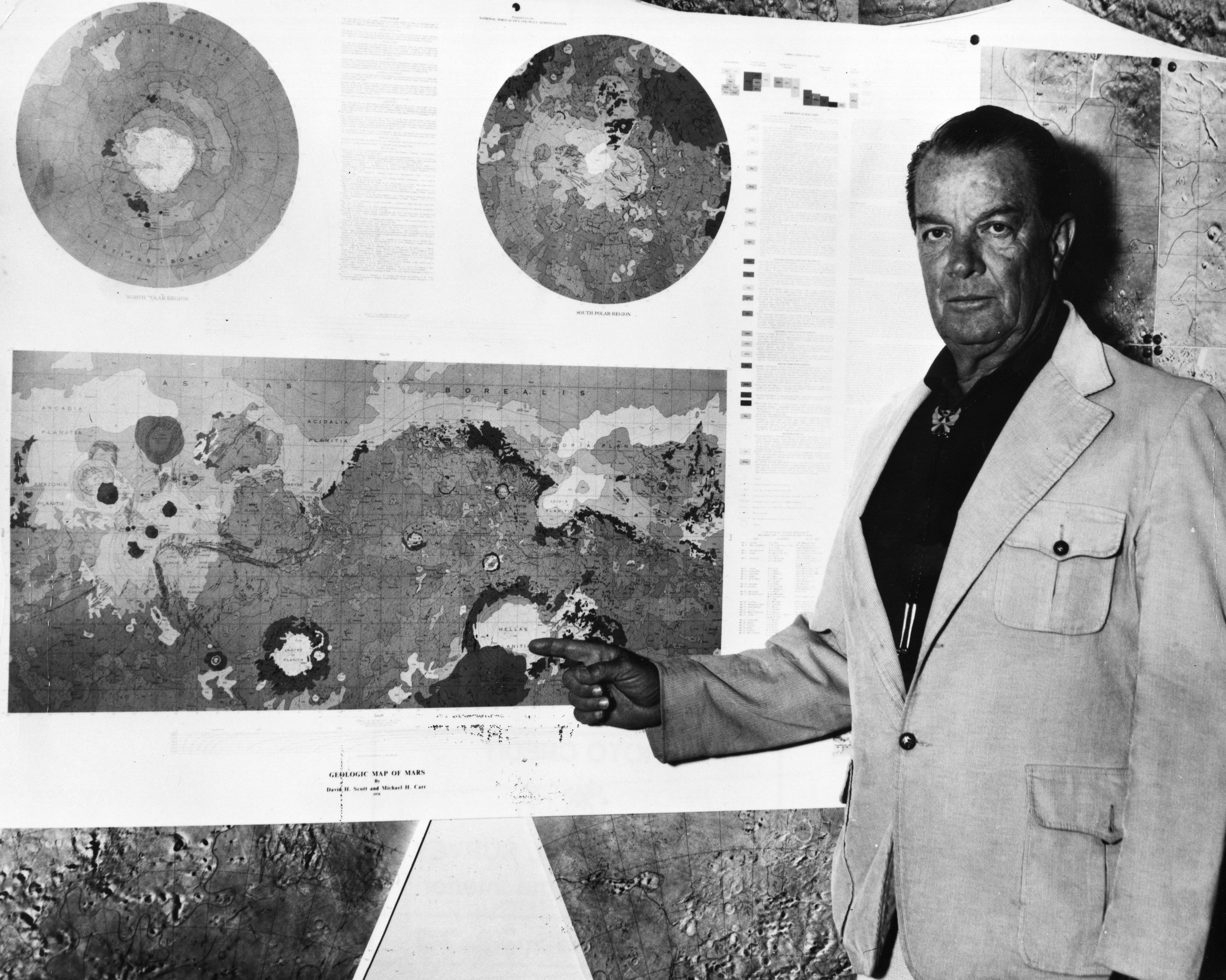
- Scott with the first geologic map of Mars
- Born: 1916
- Died: 2000
- Scientific career
- Institutions: United States Geological Survey

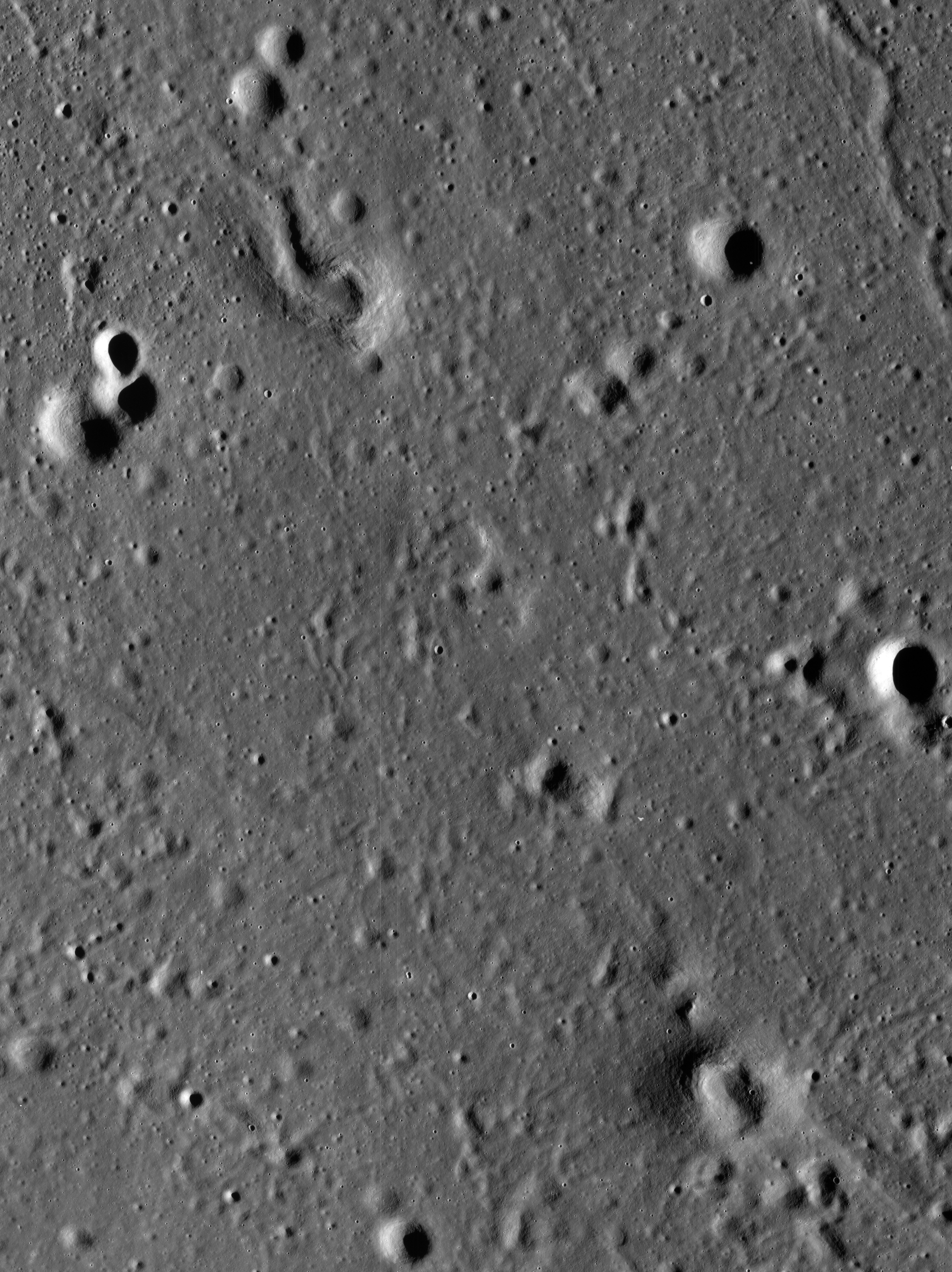
Area of southern Mare Serenitatis discussed by Scott in the Apollo 17 Preliminary Science Report, showing a row of volcanic cones.

David Holcomb Scott was an American geologist who worked for the U.S. Geological Survey's Center of Astrogeology in Flagstaff, Arizona. Scott was involved in the Apollo Program, and served as project chief for the Mars geologic mapping program, which was funded by NASA's Planetology Program Office. He served as Discipline Scientist for the NASA Planetary Geology and Geophysics Program, and founded the Lunar Geosciences Working Group, which resulted in publication of Status and Future of Lunar Geoscience. He continued to publish scientific articles on Mars through the 1990s. He authored more formal lunar and planetary geologic maps than anyone else in the Branch of Astrogeology.

According to Don Wilhelms in his 1993 book To a Rocky Moon:

[The USGS Branch of Astrogeology was] able to consider hiring David Holcomb Scott, a former oil company chief geologist and chief of exploration. [Scott] came up to me after a talk I gave in February 1966 at UCLA – which he missed – and said he wanted to do something new and interesting. He hurried through his Ph.D. and in a few years took on a mapping load that three ordinary geologists could not have upheld.

== Publications ==
- Scott, D.H.; Trask, N.J. (1971). "Geology of the Lunar Crater volcanic field, Nye County, Nevada". Geological Survey Professional Paper. Professional Paper. doi:10.3133/pp599I.
- Scott, D. H., M. N. West, B. K. Lucchitta, and J. F. McCauley. 1971. Preliminary Geologic Results from Orbital Photography. Apollo 14 Preliminary Science Report, NASA SP-272, Chapter 18 (Orbital Science Photography), Part B.
- Scott, David H. 1972. Structural Aspects of Imbrium Sculpture. Apollo 16 Preliminary Science Report, NASA SP-315, Chapter 29 (Photogeology), Part G.
- Scott, David H., Michael H. Carr, and Baerbel K. Lucchitta. 1972. Geologic maps of the Taurus–Littrow region of the Moon: Apollo 17 pre-mission maps. USGS Map 1–800.
- Scott, David H. 1973. Mare Serenitatis Cinder Cones and Terrestrial Analogs. Apollo 17 Preliminary Science Report, NASA SP-330, Chapter 30 (Volcanic Studies), Part B.
- Scott, David H. 1973. Small Structures of the Taurus–Littrow Region. Apollo 17 Preliminary Science Report, NASA SP-330, Chapter 31 (Mare Ridges and Related Studies), Part D.
- Scott, David H., John F. McCauley, and Mareta N. West. 1977. Geologic map of the west side of the Moon. USGS Map 1–1034. https://doi.org/10.3133/i1034
- Scott, David H., and Michael H. Carr. 1978. Geologic map of Mars. USGS IMAP 1083. https://doi.org/10.3133/i1083
