= Aberdeen (1801 ship) =

History

United Kingdom
- Name: Aberdeen
- Namesake: Aberdeen
- Owner: Gibbon
- Launched: 1801
- Fate: Abandoned at sea 10 December 1815

General characteristics
- Tons burthen: 324, or 325 (bm)
- Armament: 8 × 18-pounder carronades

Aberdeen was launched at Aberdeen in 1801. She spent much of her career as a West Indiaman, though she made voyages elsewhere, and was for a time a London-based transport. Her crew abandoned her at sea in December 1815.

== Career ==
Aberdeen first appeared in Lloyd's Register (LR) in 1801 with Gibbon, master and owner, and trade Liverpool-St Kitts. In 1805 her trade was Liverpool-Jamaica.

On 21 April 1807 Lloyd's List (LL) reported that Aberdeen, Fraser, master, had been put into Port Antonio on 28 January because she was leaky. She had to unload to make repairs. She arrived at Gravesend on 19 July.

Year	Master	Owner	Trade	Source & notes
1810	A.Gibbon	Gibbon	London–Jamaica	LR
1815	J.Frazer	Gibbon	London transport Liverpool–Philadelphia	LR

LR for 1816 showed Aberdeen with J. Fraser, master, Gibbon, owner, and trade Liverpool–Philadelphia.

== Fate ==
Her crew abandoned Aberdeen, Fraser, master, on 10 December 1815 in the Atlantic Ocean (39°16′N 70°30′W) with seven feet of water in her hold. She was on a voyage from Liverpool to Philadelphia, Pennsylvania.
