= David Scott (author) =

American author

David Scott (born 1961) is an American author with a special interest in religion and culture. He has published several books, including studies of Mother Teresa of Calcutta and Dorothy Day, founder of the Catholic Worker movement. Hundreds of his essays and articles have appeared in journals and periodicals throughout the world, including the Vatican newspaper, L'Osservatore Romano, as well as National Review, Commonweal, Crisis, Inside the Vatican, National Catholic Register, Washington Report on Middle East Affairs, Beliefnet.com and elsewhere.

Scott's most recent book is The Love That Made Mother Teresa (Sophia Institute Press, 2014). His previous books include: The Catholic Passion: Rediscovering the Power and Beauty of the Faith (Loyola Press, 2005), Praying in the Presence of the Lord with Dorothy Day (Our Sunday Visitor, 2002), and Weapons of the Spirit: The Selected Writings of Father John Hugo (Our Sunday Visitor, 1997), co-written with Mike Aquilina.

Scott was born in Akron, Ohio, in 1961. He holds a master's degree in religion and scripture from Pittsburgh Theological Seminary. He is married to Sarah and the couple have five children.

From 1993 to 2000, he was editor of Our Sunday Visitor, the largest-circulation independent Catholic newspaper in the United States. Earlier, he had been assistant editor of The Evangelist, the newspaper of the Roman Catholic Diocese of Albany, New York. From 2002 to 2010, he served as editorial director of The St. Paul Center for Biblical Theology, and managing editor of Center's academic journal, Letter & Spirit. He is also a contributing editor to Godspy.com. Scott has earned much recognition for his journalistic and editing work, including several Catholic Press Association awards. One of Scott's essays was included in The Best Catholic Writing 2005.

From 2010 to 2012, he served as editor in chief of Catholic News Agency and EWTN News.

Currently, Scott serves as Vice Chancellor for the Archdiocese of Los Angeles, responsible for strategic direction of all external and internal communications for the country's largest Catholic archdiocese.
