= Lone Pine Publishing =

Lone Pine Publishing is a BC-based book publisher, best known across Canada and parts of the United States for its gardening books, bird guides and nature guides. Lone Pine Publishing was founded in 1980 and managed by Canadian broadcaster and journalist Grant Kennedy and filmmaker/publisher Shane Kennedy. Since then, Lone Pine Publishing has published over 1,000 titles. The company also distributes books for a number of smaller Canadian and U.S. publishers through an extensive network of independent booksellers and other retailers, marketing in all Canadian provinces except Quebec and in the U.S. Pacific Northwest, California and the Great Lakes states. Lone Pine Publishing maintains head office operations in Vancouver, British Columbia and central warehouse operations in Edmonton, Alberta, Canada, as well as a sales office and warehouse in Tukwila, Washington, USA. The company maintains a network of satellite warehouses across Canada.
