= HMS Nautilus (1804) =

Sloop of the Royal Navy

History

United Kingdom
- Ordered: 16 December 1796
- Builder: Jacob & Sons, Milford
- Laid down: April 1798
- Launched: 12 April 1804
- Fate: Wrecked 5 January 1807

General characteristics
- Tons burthen: 43828/94 (bm)
- Length: Overall:112 ft 0 in (34.1 m); Keel:94 ft 8 1/4 in (28.9 m)
- Beam: 29 ft 6 in (9.0 m)
- Depth of hold: 9 ft 0 in (2.7 m)
- Armament: Upper deck:18 × 9-pounder guns; QD:6 × 12-pounder carronades; Fc:2 × 12-pounder carronades

HMS Nautilus was launched at Milford in 1804 as the only member of her class of sloops. She had a minor career capturing a handful of merchantmen. She was wrecked on 5 January 1807 with great hardship for the survivors and loss of life.

== Origins ==
Jean-Louis Barrallier designed Nautilus in a design approved on 7 February 1797. She was originally intended to be flush-decked but then the design was modified to include a quarterdeck and a forecastle. She was the only vessel of her type and the only sloop to have a main battery of 9-pounder guns.

== Career ==
Commander George Aldham commissioned Nautilus in April 1804 for the Channel.

On 9 August 1804 Nautilus recaptured the West Indiaman William Heathcote and sent her into Plymouth. The privateer General Augereau had captured her on 4 August in a notable single ship action.

On 23 August Nautilus sent into Plymouth Count Suwaroff, Pondelli, master. Count Suwaroff had been sailing from Petersburg to Corunna.

On 12 September Nautilus detained the American ship Colombe, of Boston, Iday, master. She had been sailing to Dunkirk with tobacco and staves. Colombe arrived at Plymouth the next day.

On 12 November Nautilus detained the Spanish ship Echo, Francisco Barzelo, master.

Commander Aldham received a promotion to post captain on 20 February 1805. Before he left he sent into Plymouth a valuable Spanish ship from the River Plate that arrived on 23 February. The Spanish ship had fallen prey first to a Jersey privateer, and then to the French privateer General Perignon before Nautilus recaptured her. This may have been the vessel Carmella, which had been carrying specie.

Commander John Sykes replaced Aldham on 8 March 1805. On 29 September Nautilus captured Johanna Catharina, and on 3 October Eserance. The Vice Admiralty Court at Gibraltar condemned both.

After the Battle of Trafalgar on 21 October, Lt. Lapenotiere in HMS Pickle raced Captain Sykes in Nautilus over 1000 miles to England with the news of the victory. Pickle was the first to deliver the dispatches to the Admiralty. Lt. Lapenotiere was awarded the then huge sum of £500 and was promoted to Commander.

Sykes received a promotion to post captain on 22 January 1806 and in February 1806 Commander Edward Palmer replaced Sykes. Palmer sailed Nautilus for the Mediterranean.

In the early morning of 4 May 1806, the boats of HMS Renommee and Nautilus, under the command of Lieutenant Sir William Parker, of Renommee, brought out from under the fire of the guns of the town and tower of Vieja and also from under the fire of more than 100 musketeers, the Spanish naval schooner Giganta. Giganta was armed with two 24-pounders, three 4-pounder long guns, four 4-pounders, and swivel guns. She had a crew of 38 men under the command of Alfirre de Navis Don Juan de Moire. British casualties amounted to four men severely wounded and three lightly wounded; Spanish casualties consisted of one man mortally wounded and nime men severely wounded. There were no immediate fatalities. Captain Sir Thomas Livingstone, of Renommee, recommended that the Navy take Giganta into service at Gibraltar.

On 8 July Nautilus sailed from Gibraltar for Malta.

== Fate ==
Nautilus left the Bay of Abydos, in the Hellespont, with urgent despatches for the Commander-in-chief off Cadiz. On 5 January 1807 she struck an uncharted rock between Kithera and Andikythera. The survivors reached the barren rock where they took refuge, though there was no shelter from the weather. The one surviving boat was manned and eventually was able to reach Kithera and summon help. It took six days for help to arrive and or 62 of the 122 men aboard died. Her second lieutenant gave the number of deaths as 58, consisting of some 18 men who drowned in the original wrecking, six men who died in attempts to leave the island, and 34 men who died of hunger and exposure. Captain Palmer died shortly before help arrived.
