= City of London (1801 ship) =

History

United Kingdom
- Name: City of London
- Builder: William Rowe, St Peter's, Newcastle
- Launched: 1801
- Captured: January–February 1806

General characteristics
- Tons burthen: 379 (bm)
- Armament: 1802: 4 × 6-pounder + 2 × 4-pounder guns; 1806: 4 × 6-pounder + 2 × 9-pounder guns

City of London was launched in Newcastle in 1801. She spent most of her brief career sailing as a West Indiaman. A French privateer captured her in January or February 1806.

City of London first appeared in Lloyd's Register (LR) in 1802.

Year	Master	Owner	Trade	Source
1802	Featonby	Fenn & Co.	London–Quebec	LR
1803	Featonby; J.Ewin	Phyn & Co.	London–Quebec; London–Grenada	LR
1804	J.Ewin; Davidson	Phyn & Co.	London–Grenada	LR
1805	Davidson; T.Lamb	Phyn & Co. Sibbald & Co.	London–Grenada	LR
1806	T.Lamb	Sibbalds & Co.	London–Jamaica	LR

The Journal de Commerce reported that General Perignon had arrived at Saint-Malo on 13 February 1806 with two English prizes, one of 300 tons and one of 400. They were carrying sugar, coffee, rum, logwood, etc. One of the British vessels was British Hero, and the other was City of London. Général Pérignon brought them into Saint-Malo.
