= William Heathcote (1800 ship) =

History

Great Britain
- Name: William Heathcote
- Builder: Liverpool
- Launched: 1800
- Fate: Wrecked July 1816

General characteristics
- Tons burthen: 500, or 503, 506, or 508, or 517 (bm)
- Complement: 1800:30; 1807:40; 1810:30
- Armament: 1800:16 × 4&6-pounder guns; 1800:24 × 9-pounder guns; 1807:18 × 9-pounder guns; 1810:12 × 9-pounder guns

William Heathcote was launched in Liverpool in 1800. She made one voyage as a slave ship in the triangular trade in enslaved people. Next, a French privateer captured her in a single-ship action, and the British Royal Navy recaptured her. She became a West Indiaman before she again made an enslaving voyage, one of the last such legal voyages. After British participation in the trans-Atlantic slave trade ended, she became a West Indiaman again; she then sailed to Brazil and as a transport. She was wrecked in July 1816.

== Career ==
William Heathcote first appeared in Lloyd's Register (LR) in 1800.

| Year | Master | Owner | Trade | Source |
|---|---|---|---|---|
| 1800 | J.Brown | Neelson | Liverpool–Africa | LR |

1st voyage transporting enslaved people (1800–1802): Captain John Stothart acquired a letter of marque on 30 September 1800. He sailed from Liverpool on 18 November. In 1800, 133 vessels sailed from English ports, bound for the trade in enslaved people. Of these vessels, 120 sailed from Liverpool.

William Heathcote acquired captives in Bonny and arrived in May 1801 in Demerara with 373 captives. Lloyd's List reported on 3 March 1801 that a schooner, bound for St Domingo from Bordeaux, had come into Dominica. The schooner was a prize to Brooks and William Heathcote, of Liverpool.

William Heathcote arrived back at Liverpool on 9 April 1802. She had left Liverpool with 60 crew members and she suffered 14 crew deaths on her voyage.

On her return from Demerara William Heathcote became a West Indiaman.

| Year | Master | Owner | Trade | Source |
|---|---|---|---|---|
| 1804 | J.Brown; T.Phillips | Heathcote; Neilson & Co. | Liverpool–Africa; Liverpool–Demerara | LR |

On 4 August 1804 William Heathcote was returning to Liverpool from Demerara when a French privateer captured her. The privateer was General Augereau, of 12 guns and 90 men. In the action leading up to the capture, Captain Phillips, his son, a passenger, and a seaman were killed, and the mate, a passenger and seven seamen wounded; General Auguereau had three men killed and her captain and five men wounded. (Note: General Augereau, of 162-tons, pierced for 14 guns, was recommissioned as a privateer in Bayonne in July 1803. From July 1803 to September 1804, she was under Étienne Pellot with 11 officers, 74 or 74 men, and 12 carronades. Another captain from late 1804 to February 1805, with 70 to 88 men, until HMS Topaze captured General Augereau on 13 February 1805 in the Caribbean.) On 9 August HMS Nautilus recaptured William Heathcote and sent her into Plymouth. William Heathcote was carrying a cargo that the press reported was worth £80,000 and that consisted of cotton, coffee, indigo, cochineal, sugar, and cotton. The capture took place off Bayonne and HMS Indefatigable shared by agreement. The hired armed brig Cockatrice escorted William Heathcote into Liverpool on 2 October 1804. The underwriters agreed a valuation of £36,000 for the cargo and £8,000 for the vessel.

| Year | Master | Owner | Trade | Source |
|---|---|---|---|---|
| 1807 | T.Phillips; M.Joynson | Neilson & Co. | Liverpool–Africa; Liverpool–Demerara | LR |

2nd voyage transporting enslaved people (1807–1808): Captain Moses Joynson acquired a letter of marque on 17 March 1807. The Slave Trade Act 1807, which forbade British ships to engage in the slave trade, took effect on 1 May 1807, but William Heathcote must have cleared customs outbound before that date as Captain Joyson did not sail until 6 July. (Note: The last British vessel to sail legally was Kitty's Amelia. She had cleared customs on 27 April though she did not sail until 27 July) William Heathcote arrived in Suriname in February 1808. She arrived back in Liverpool on 17 August.

| Year | Master | Owner | Trade | Source |
|---|---|---|---|---|
| 1809 | M.Joynson; H.Langley | Neilson | Liverpool-Demerara | Register of Shipping |
| 1811 | H.Langley; T.Henley | Neilson | Liverpool-Demerara; Forshaw | Register of Shipping |

Captain John Hanley acquired a letter of marque on 11 December 1810.

| Year | Master | Owner | Trade | Source |
|---|---|---|---|---|
| 1812 | J.Henley | Forshall | Liverpool–Brazils | LR |
| 1816 | Bateman | Foreshall & Co. | London transport Liverpool–Philadelphia | LR |

In February 1816 an advertisement appeared in the press stating that William Heathcote, William Batman, master, was intending to sail to Philadelphia, Pennsylvania. She sailed on 11 February but had to put back two days later leaky and with her main top mast sprung.

== Fate ==
William Heathcote was wrecked in July 1816 on Bier Island. Her crew and part of her materials were saved. She was on a voyage from Philadelphia to Saint John, New Brunswick. British North America.
