= Lorenzo Albacete =

Puerto Rican Catholic priest, scientist, and theologian

- Born: Lorenzo Albacete Cintrón; January 7, 1941; San Juan, Puerto Rico
- Died: October 23, 2014 (aged 73); Dobbs Ferry, New York
- Resting place: Cementerio Porta Coeli in Bayamón, Puerto Rico
- Education: Catholic University of America (BA, MA)
- Occupations: Priest, scientist, author

Lorenzo Albacete Cintrón (January 7, 1941 – October 23, 2014) was a Puerto Rican theologian, Roman Catholic priest, scientist and author. A contributor to The New York Times Magazine, Albacete was one of the leaders in the United States for the international Catholic movement Communion and Liberation. He was the chairman of the Board of Advisors of Crossroads Cultural Center.

== Biography ==
Lorenzo Albacete Cintrón was born in San Juan, Puerto Rico, and was a physicist by training. He held a degree in Space Science and Applied Physics as well as a master's degree in Sacred Theology from the Catholic University of America in Washington, D.C. After receiving his master’s degree in space science and applied physics, Lorenzo carried out aerospace research at the Naval Ordnance Laboratory for several years.

Albacete wrote for Triumph Magazine in Washington, D.C., from 1969 to 1972 and taught theology in El Escorial, Spain from 1970 to 1972 at the Christian Commonwealth Institute. In 1972 Albacete was ordained to the priesthood in San Juan, Puerto Rico by Cardinal Luis Aponte Martinez for the Roman Catholic Archdiocese of Washington. He held a doctorate in Sacred Theology from the Pontifical University of St. Thomas Aquinas in Rome. He taught at the John Paul II Institute in Washington, D.C., and the St. Joseph's Seminary and College in Yonkers, N.Y. He was advisor on Hispanic Affairs to the U.S. Conference of Catholic Bishops.

Albacete was a columnist for the Italian weekly Tempi, wrote for The New Yorker, and appeared or was interviewed on CNN, The Charlie Rose Show, PBS, EWTN, Slate, The New Republic, and Godspy, where he was the theological advisor.

In 2010, Albacete's commentary was featured in the award-winning documentary film, The Human Experience.

Albacete lived in Yonkers, N.Y. He died on October 23, 2014, in Dobbs Ferry, New York. He was buried at Cementerio Porta Coeli in Bayamón, Puerto Rico.

== Bibliography ==
- God at the Ritz: Attraction to Infinity. NY: Crossroad, 2002. ISBN 0-8245-1951-5.
- Albacete, Lorenzo (2021). Lickona, Lisa; Wolfe, Gregory (eds.). The relevance of the stars: Christ, culture, destiny. Wipf and Stock. ISBN 978-1-7252-7384-9. OCLC 1235284366.
