= HMS Hermes (1803) =

Sloop of the Royal Navy

History

United Kingdom
- Name: Majestic
- Builder: Whitby
- Launched: 1801
- Fate: Sold July 1803

United Kingdom
- Name: Hermes
- Acquired: July 1803 by purchase
- Fate: Sold 24 March 1810

General characteristics
- Tons burthen: 339 (bm)
- Length: Overall:107 ft 0 in (32.6 m); Keel:84 ft 3 in (25.7 m)
- Beam: 27 ft 6 in (8.4 m)
- Depth of hold: 12 ft 9 in (3.9 m)
- Propulsion: Sails
- Complement: 100
- Armament: Upper Deck:14 × 24-pounder carronades; Fc:2 × 6-pounder chase guns

HMS Hermes was launched as the mercantile Majestic at Whitby in 1801. The British Royal Navy purchased Majestic in 1803. She had an uneventful career and the Navy sold her in 1810.

== Career ==
Absent original research, there are no records that provide any further details about Majestic's origins or career prior to her sale to the Navy. She does not appear in the most complete list of vessels built at Whitby. She is not Majestic, which also was launched at Whitby in 1801.

After the Admiralty purchased Majestic in July 1803, she underwent fitting at Woolwich between July and October. Commander John Astley Bennett commissioned her in August for the North Sea.

In May 1804 Commander John Davie transferred from his position with the Sea Fencibles at Harwich to replace Bennett. He transferred to Favorite in December. In January 1805 Commander Joseph Westbeach took command. Hermes underwent fitting at Sheerness between September and November. Commander Peter Rye recommissioned her in October 1806. In November Commander Edward Reynolds Sibly (or Sibley) replaced Rye.

On 9 March 1807 Hermes sailed for the Cape of Good Hope. In 1808 she participated in the British operations in the River Plate.

Commander Silby transferred to Sheerwater in May 1809 while Hermes was at Deptford between April and June being fitted as a storeship. She was recommissioned in April.

== Fate ==
The "Principal Officeres and Commissioners of His Majesty's Navy" offered Hermes, lying at Deptford, for sale on 24 March 1810. She sold there on that date.
