= Bristol Packet (1801 ship) =

UK merchant ship 1801–1808

History

United Kingdom
- Name: Bristol Packet
- Owner: A. Harris
- Port of registry: Liverpool
- Builder: New England
- Launched: 1801
- Fate: Wrecked at Minehead in 1808

General characteristics
- Tons burthen: 249 bm
- Length: 98 ft (30 m)
- Draught: 15 ft (4.6 m) fully laden
- Propulsion: Sails
- Sail plan: Full-rigged ship

Bristol Packet was a wooden full-rigged ship built in New England in 1801 that was lost in 1808. A wreck, believed to be of Bristol Packet lies in sand on Madbrain beach at Minehead in Somerset, England. The wreck has been scheduled as an ancient monument.

== History ==
The ship was built in 1801 in New England. She enters Lloyd's Register in 1802 with Daniel Orr, master, A. Harris, owner, and trade Bristol-Boston.

The 1808 Lloyd's Register stated that she had been surveyed at Dublin in April 1806 and was registered at Liverpool. Three vessels with the same name were included in the register, although the other two were sloops. Lloyd's Register gave her master's name as W. Day (changing to J. Barns).

His Majesty's cutter Nile, Lieutenant James Lloyd, recaptured the American ship Bristol Packet, William Day, master, on 5 February 1807. A Spanish privateer had captured Bristol Packet as she was sailing from Liverpool to Philadelphia. Nile took her into Falmouth.

Bristol Packet, Day, master, was lost on a coastal voyage from Teignmouth to Bristol in February 1808.

== Wreck ==
A wreck that is believed to be that of Bristol Packet lies in the intertidal zone on Madbrian sands off Minehead where it has been exposed at different times including between February 2014 and July 2015 when a visual survey was undertaken and the exposed parts of the wreck photographed. The position of the wreck indicates it was driven on its beam ends onto the sands. The date of the vessel is confirmed by comparison of the way it was built of pine and larch, incorporating both treenails and copper fastenings, with other vessels of the same period. Bristol Packet is known to have had pine topsides.

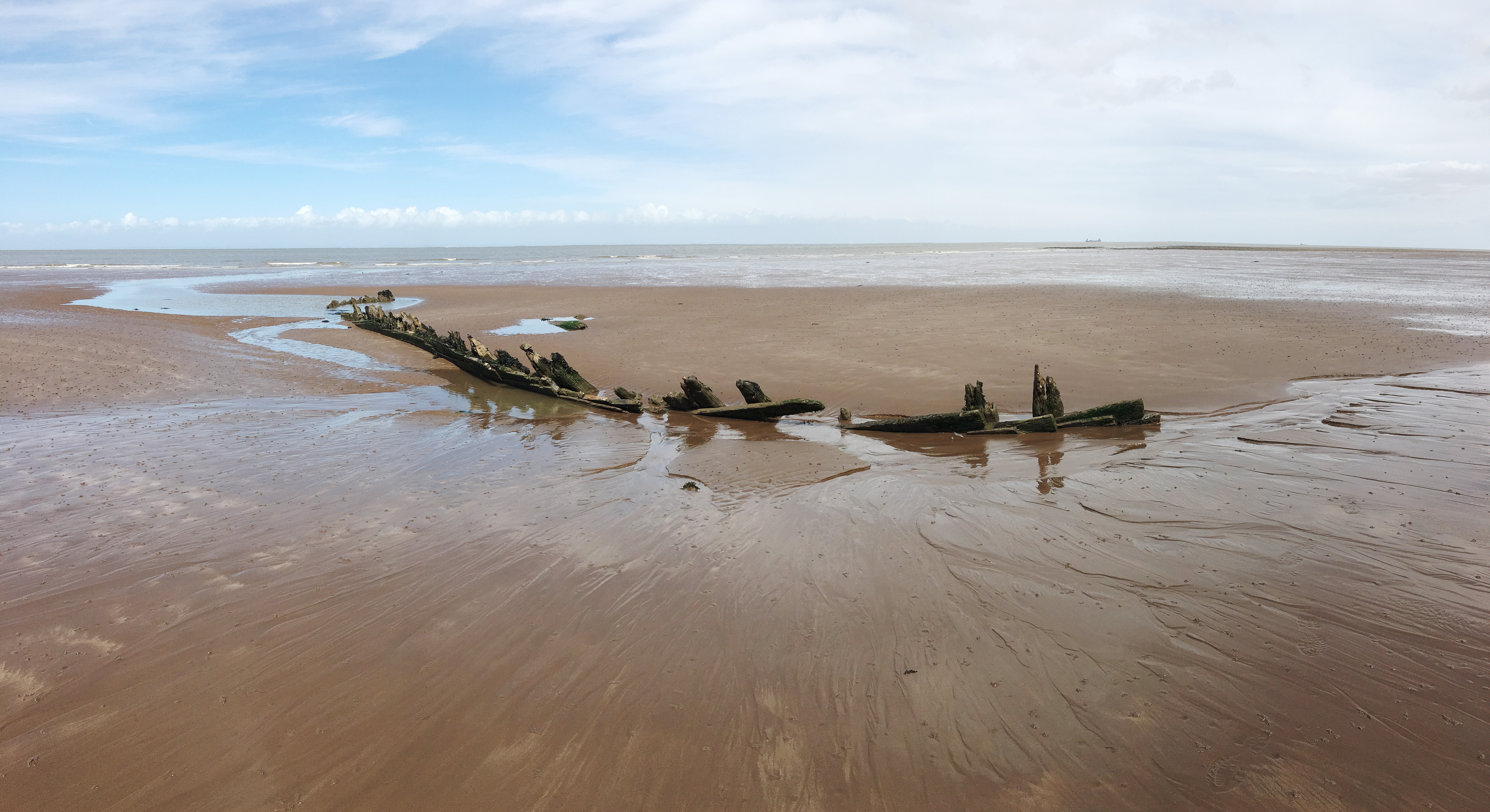
The remains of the Bristol Packet shipwreck near Minehead
