= Dave Scott (artist) =

American artist (born 1994)

- Born: David Scott; 1994 (age 31–32); Trotwood, Ohio, United States
- Occupation: painter

Dave Scott (born 1994) is an American painter from Trotwood, Ohio known for his colorful paintings. Scott has exhibited work across the United States, including at the Cincinnati Art Museum and the Contemporary Arts Center.
