= David Scott (art historian) =

American art historian (1916–2009)

David Winfield Scott (July 10, 1916 – March 30, 2009) was an American art historian and artist who managed several important American art collections.

== Early life ==
Scott was born in Fall River, Massachusetts. After high school, he studied with Millard Sheets prior to enrolling in Harvard University. He graduated with honors in English literature in 1937. After college, he studied at the Art Students League of New York.

== Professional career and art interests ==
In addition to his time as the leading director of the National Museum of American Art, Scott held numerous other positions at various art museums and galleries. Scott joined the Smithsonian Institution's staff in 1963, as assistant director of what was then known as the National Collection of Fine Arts after teaching art history at Scripps College in Claremont. In 1969, he was named planning officer of the National Gallery, where he served as liaison with architect I.M. Pei. In 1990, Scott took over for 11 months as the acting director of the Corcoran, and arranged for new exhibitions while bringing stability to the gallery's finances.

Scott was an avid enthusiast of contemporary art. He himself was avid painter of what he called "abstracts and mindscapes." His personal collection included largely post-World War II painting, especially abstracts. He was known to be fond of Arshile Gorky, Stephen Sacklarian, and Millard Sheets, whom he took a class from, among other notable contemporary abstractionists.

== Personal life and legacy ==
Scott's first wife, Tirsa Saavedra, died in 1986. He later married Doris White Scott. He was survived by two daughters, four stepchildren, and four grandchildren.
