= HMS Starling (1801) =

Brig of the Royal Navy

History

United Kingdom
- Name: HMS Starling
- Namesake: Starling
- Ordered: 7 January 1801
- Builder: Balthazar & Edward Adams, Bucklers Hard
- Launched: 4 April 1801
- Fate: Wrecked December 1804

General characteristics
- Class & type: Bloodhound-class gun-brig
- Type: Gun-brig
- Tons burthen: 1859/94 (bm)
- Length: 80 ft 1 1/2 in (24.4 m) (gundeck); 65 ft 8 in (20.02 m) (keel)
- Beam: 23 ft 0 1/4 in (7.0 m)
- Depth of hold: 8 ft 6 in (2.59 m)
- Complement: 50
- Armament: 12 × 18-pounder carronades

HMS Starling was launched in 1801. She grounded in December 1804 and burnt to avoid her falling into enemy hands.

== Career ==
Lieutenant John Baker commissioned Starling in May 1801.

On 23 September 1802, HMS Pomone struck a rock while entering St. Aubin's Bay and sank. Starling shuttled back and forth between Portsmouth and Jersey bringing back stores and taking out artificers. Pomone was refloated and towed into Portsmouth in October but was not worth repairing.

Lieutenant John Guyon recommissioned her in February 1803.

On 24 June Starling recaptured the brigs William, of Sunderland, and Diana, of London, and their cargoes. She also recaptured Egyptian, of Waterford, which had been sailing in ballast. (Note: Egyptian, of 43 tons burthen, Welch, master, had been launched at Southampton in 1790.) The French privateer Phoebe had captured them before HMS Hydra and His Majesty's hired armed cutter Rose captured Phoebe the next day. (Note: Phoebe, of four guns, two swivel guns, and 33 men, had left Cherbourg some seven days earlier. Phoebe had been commissioned in Cherbourg in 1800 with Guillaume Mosquerer, master. She made another cruise under François Folliot in 1800. French sources show her having departed in May or June 1803 with 28 men and 4 guns, and being captured by Hydra on 25 June.) Starling and Hyda arrived at Portsmouth on 29 June.

From 1804 Starling was under the command of Lieutenant George Skottowe (or Shotton), on the Downs station.

== Fate ==
Lloyd List reported on 28 December 1804 that Starling had run on shore on 25 December in a fog near Calais. She was burnt and her crew returned safely to Deal.

Skottowe had sailed from the Downs on 24 December to take station off Calais. In late afternoon she ran aground while in a heavy fog. Skottowe had her crew take the boats and stand off, to return at the next high tide. The marines stayed on board to repel an attack should the French find her and attempt to board. The French did not discover her and the boats returned, but despite every effort to lighten Starling, she remained stuck. Skottowe set her on fire and her complement sailed back across the Channel in her cutter and the jolly boat. it turned out that she had grounded in Wissant Bay, near Cape Griz Nez.

The subsequent court-martial exonerated Skottowe and his crew, However, it blamed the pilot for sailing too far south and not using the lead. Because of his good prior service, he was admonished to be more careful in the future.
