= Albion (1804 ship) =

History

United Kingdom
- Name: Albion
- Launched: 1801, Shields
- Fate: Abandoned at sea in 1807

General characteristics
- Tons burthen: 345 (bm)
- Armament: 2 × 6-pounder guns + 2 × 18-pounder carronades

Albion was launched at Shields in 1801, possibly under another name. She first appeared as Albion in 1804. Her crew abandoned her at sea in 1807.

== Career ==
Albion first appeared in Lloyd's Register (LR) in 1804.

Year	Master	Owner	Trade	Source & notes
1804	J.Allen	Hurry & Co.	Cork transport	LR
1807	J.Allen; Pawson	Hurry & Co.	Cork transport London–Jamaica	LR; large repair 1807
1808	Pawson	Fletcher	London–Jamaica	LR

== Loss ==
In January 1808, Lloyd's List reported that the crew of Albion, Pawson, master, had deserted their vessel at sea. She had been on her way from Grenada. Magnet, coming from Surinam, took up the crew and came into the Downs.
