= Retreat (1801 ship) =

UK merchant ship (1801–1814)

History

United Kingdom
- Name: Retreat
- Owner: Sir Robert Wigram
- Builder: Obadiah Ayles, Topsham, Devon
- Launched: 18 September 1801
- Fate: Sold for breaking up in 1814

General characteristics
- Type: Ship
- Tons burthen: 450, or 505, or 513, or 548, or 54874/94, or 549 (bm)
- Length: 116 ft 2 1/2 in (35.4 m) (overall); 91 ft 5 in (27.9 m) (keel)
- Beam: 32 ft 3 in (9.8 m)
- Depth of hold: 14 ft 0 1/2 in (4.3 m)
- Propulsion: Sail
- Complement: 1805:60; 1809:50
- Armament: 1805:12 × 12-pounder carronades; 1809:16 × 12-pounder guns
- Notes: Three decks

Retreat was launched in 1801 and briefly sailed as a West Indiaman between London and Jamaica. She then made five voyages for the British East India Company (EIC) as an "extra ship", that is, under charter. She was broken up in 1814.

== Career ==
=== West Indiaman (1801–1805) ===
Retreat appeared in Lloyd's Register for 1801 with J. Alidish, master, Wigram, owner, and trade: London transport. On 7 February 1802 Retreat, Shaw, master, ran into the barge Hope on the River Thames, sinking the barge. Retreat was on her way to Jamaica. Seven days later, Retreat had to put into Plymouth as she was leaking.

Lloyd's Register for 1805 shows her master as J. Shaw, and her trade as London—Jamaica.

On 9 January 1804 the EIC engaged Retreat for one voyage at £29 15s per ton. Prior to engaging Retreat, the EIC had Perry measure and examine her.

=== EIC voyage #1 (1805–1806) ===
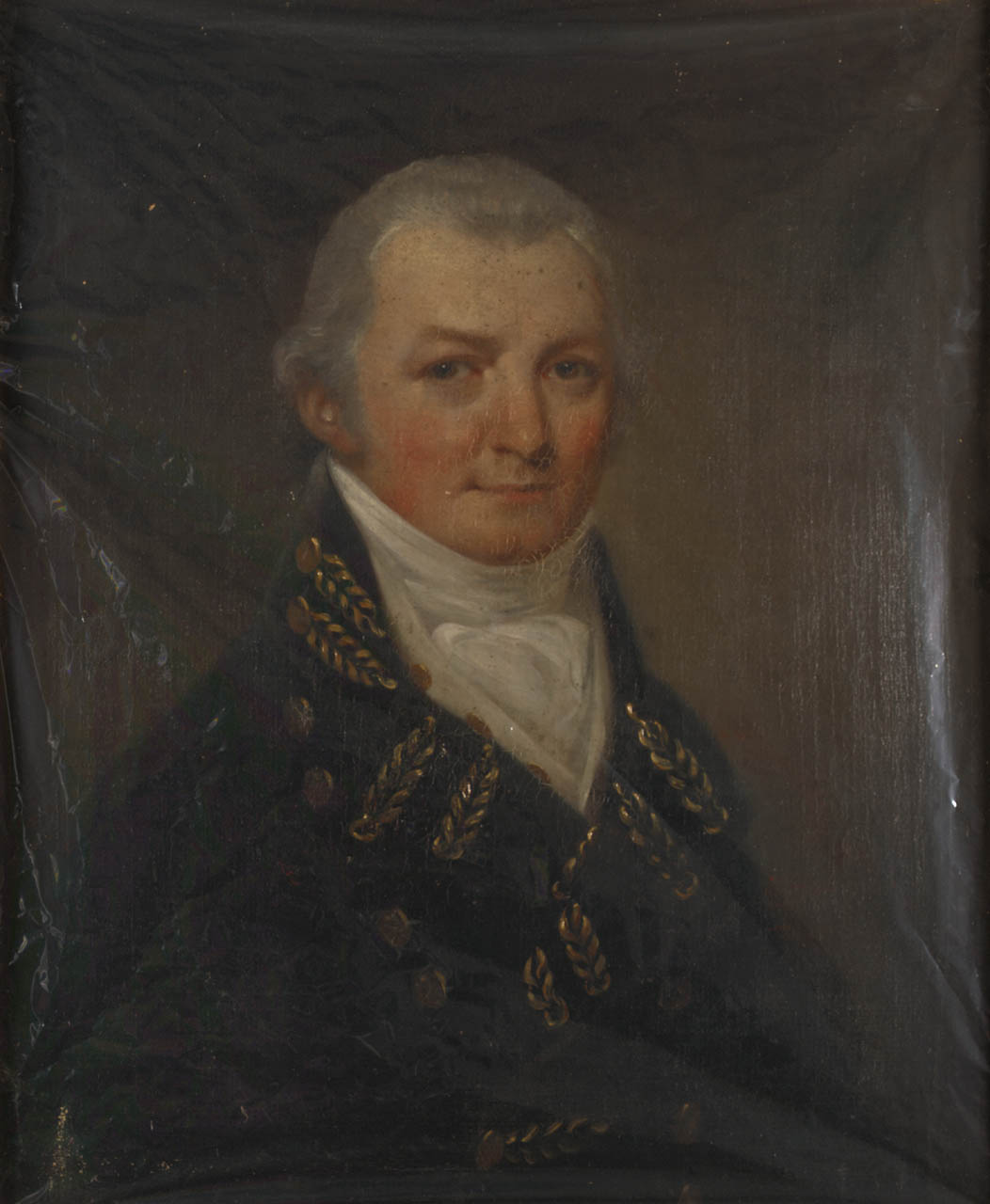
Commander William Hay, by William Armfield Hobday, 1815, National Maritime Museum, Greenwich

Captain William Hay acquired a letter of marque on 9 April 1805. He sailed from Portsmouth on 25 April, bound for Bombay. Retreat arrived at Bombay on 11 August. Homeward bound, she stopped at Goa on 8 November, reached St Helena on 28 January 1806, and Cork on 6 April. She arrived at her moorings on 8 May.

On 12 November 1806, the EIC chartered Retreat for four voyages at £15 per ton.

=== EIC voyage #2 (1806–1808) ===
Captain Hay was Retreat's master for her second voyage for the EIC as well. He sailed from the Downs on 31 December 1806, bound for China. Retreat reached Penang on 26 May 1806, and arrived at Whampoa Anchorage on 5 July. Homeward bound, she crossed the Second Bar on 4 January 1808 and was at Malacca on 23 January. She reached St Helena on 14 April, and arrived at the Downs on 30 June.

=== EIC voyage #3 (1809–1810) ===
Captain Thomas Herbert Harris acquired a letter of marque on 31 March 1809. He sailed from Portsmouth on 28 April, bound for Madras and Bengal. Retreat was at Madeira on 8 May and Madras by 15 September. She arrived at Calcutta on 26 October.Homeward bound she was at Culpee on 18 December, Madras on 13 January 1810, and Pointe de Galle on 17 February. She reached St Helena on 3 May and arrived at the Downs on 7 July. Captain Harris's next command was Prince Regent.

=== EIC voyage #4 (1811–1812) ===
Captain Thomas Watson Leech sailed from Torbay on 30 May 1811, bound for Bengal. Retreat reached Madeira on 21 June and Saugor on 17 November. She reached Calcutta on 24 November. Homeward bound, she was at Saugor on 23 February 1812, and reached St Helena on 14 June and Falmouth on 4 September. She arrived at the Downs on 14 September.

=== EIC voyage #5 (1813–1814) ===
Captain Leech sailed from Portsmouth on 20 April 1813, bound for Bengal and Bencoolen. Retreat was at Madeira on 13 May and São Tiago on 29 May. She reached Saugor on 12 September and arrived at Calcutta on 23 September. Continuing her voyage, she was at Saugor on 16 November and arrived at Bencoolen on 3 January 1814. Homeward bound, she reached St Helena on 7 April and arrived at the Downs on 6 August. Four days later, Retreat went onshore at Foulness. Before she could be refloated part of her cargo had to be removed. She was got off and arrived at Blackwall.

== Fate ==
Wigram sold Retreat later in 1814 for breaking up.
