= David Scott (1801 EIC ship) =

History

United Kingdom
- Name: David Scott
- Namesake: David Scott (of Dunninald)
- Owner: John Locke
- Operator: British East India Company
- Builder: Pitcher, Northfleet
- Launched: 7 November 1801
- Fate: Hulked 1816

General characteristics
- Tons burthen: 1276, 12768/94, or 1335 (bm)
- Length: Overall: 166 ft 3 in (50.7 m); Keel: 134 ft 4 3/4 in (41.0 m)
- Beam: 42 ft 3 in (12.9 m)
- Depth of hold: 17 ft 1 in (5.2 m)
- Complement: 1804:135; 1806:150
- Armament: 1804: 38 × 18-pounder guns; 1806: 38 × 18-pounder guns

David Scott was launched on the Thames in 1801 as an East Indiaman. Between 1801 and 1816 she made seven voyages for the British East India Company (EIC). She was sold in 1816 for hulking.

== Career ==
1st EIC voyage (1802–1803): Captain Charles Jones sailed from the Downs n 4 March 1802, bound for China. David Scott arrived at Whampoa on 18 July. Homeward bound, she crossed the Second Bar on 21 October. She reached St Helena on 15 February 1803 and Plymouth on 13 April; she arrived at Gravesend on 24 April.

2nd EIC voyage (1804–1805): Captain David Jones acquired a letter of marque on 21 January 1804. He sailed from Plymouth on 26 February 1804, bound for Bombay and Madras. On 22 March David Scott was at Santa Cruz. David Scott arrived at Bombay on 25 June. She reached Madras on 3 September.

In October Elizabeth Gwillim, a naturalist and artist then living in Madras, consigned to David Scott two boxes of plants, including one plant over two feet tall. The plants were placed on the poop deck where they would get strong sunlight and be further away from sea spray from the bow. The plants arrived safely in the United Kingdom, something that was far from certain. It is not clear what the two-foot plant was, but it may have been Gwillimia Indica, a variety of magnolia. (Note: The plant, which a German doctor resident in Madras had named for Elizabeth Gwillim, was found to be an already described species of Magnolia, Magnolia coco.)

David Scott reached St Helena on 31 December, and Plymouth on 10 March 1805. She arrived at Gravesend on 23 March.

3rd EIC voyage (1806–1807): Captain John Locke, jr. acquired a letter of marque on 28 January 1806. Most sources, however, state that it was his father, John Locke, who sailed from Portsmouth, bound for Madras and China.

It was possibly on this voyage that David Scott carried some 300 troops to India. Between England and Santiago, Cape Verde, a French privateer approached and fired two broadsides, with little or no effect. Captain Locke returned fire, dismounting two guns on the privateer. The privateer approached to attempt to take David Scott by boarding, but when the French saw the troops on deck with muskets in hand, the privateer veered off and sailed away. British casualties consisted of one man wounded. The next day David Scott stopped at Santiago to replenish her water.

David Scott reached Madras on 28 June and Penang on 15 August. She arrived at Whampoa on 19 October. Homeward bound, she crossed the Second Bar on 5 December, and stopped at Penang again on 23 January 1806.

Homeward bound, she and the other Indiamen she was travelling with, as well as their escort, tried to enter Table Bay on 5 April, but were unable to. They went on to St Helena instead. She reached St Helena on 18 April and arrived back at Long Reach on 5 July.

4th EIC voyage (1808–1809): Captain John Locke jun. sailed from Portsmouth on 5 March 1808, bound for Madras and China. David Scott arrived at Madras on 25 June. On her way to China she stopped at Penang on 1 August and Malacca on 29 August. She arrived at Whampoa on 5 October. Homeward bound, she crossed the Second Bar on 5 February 1809, reached Penang again on 3 March and St Helena on 11 June, and arrived at Long Reach on 14 September.

5th EIC voyage (1810–1811): Captain John Locke jun. sailed from Portsmouth on 13 April 1810, bound for Madras and China. David Scott was at Porto Praya on 23 May, and arrived at Madras on 28 August. From there she reached Penang on 3 November and arrived at Whampoa on 8 February 1811. Homeward bound, she crossed the Second Bar on 6 March, reached St Helena on 11 July and Falmouth on 18 September, and arrived at Gravesend on 30 September.

6th EIC voyage (1812–1813): Captain John Locke jun. sailed from Portsmouth on 1 March 1812, bound for Madras and China. David Scott reached Madras on 11 June, Penang on 26 September, and Malacca on 22 October; she arrived at Whampoa on 14 January 1813. Homeward bound, she crossed the Second Bar on 3 February, reached St Helena on 27 May, and arrived at Long Reach on 21 August.

7th EIC voyage (1815–1816): Captain John Locke jun. sailed from the Downs on 14 January 1815, bound for Bombay and China. David Scott was at the Cape on 31 March and arrived at Bombay on 22 May. She reached Penang on 8 August and arrived at Whampoa on 23 September. Homeward bound, she crossed the Second Bar on 27 November, and stopped at Macao on 18 January 1816. She reached St Helena on 23 March and arrived at Gravesend on 6 May.

When David Scott arrived back at London she discharged her crew, including her Chinese sailors hired in Canton. Princess Amelia repatriated 18 to Canton, together with 362 others, leaving the Downs on 20 July 1816.

== Fate ==
In 1816 David Scott was sold for use as a hulk.
