= British Hero (1801 ship) =

History

United Kingdom
- Name: British Hero
- Builder: Thomas Hearn, North Shields
- Launched: 1801
- Captured: January–February 1806

General characteristics
- Tons burthen: 300 (bm)

British Hero was launched in 1801 in North Shields. A French privateer captured her in January or February 1806.

British Hero first appeared in Lloyd's Register (LR) in 1804. She had already appeared in the ship arrival and departure data in Lloyd's List since 1802, trading with the Baltic.

Year	Master	Owner	Trade	Source
1804	W.Hogarth	J.Bell	London–Baltic	LR
1806	W.Hogarth	J.Bell	Cork	LR

The Journal de Commerce reported that the French privateer General Perignon had arrived at Saint-Malo on 13 February 1806 with two English prizes, one of 300 tons and one of 400. They were carrying sugar, coffee, rum, logwood, etc. One of the British vessels was British Hero, and the other was City of London, of 379 tons. Général Pérignon brought them into Saint-Malo.
