= Majestic (1801 ship) =

History

United Kingdom
- Name: Majestic
- Owner: Aaron and Robert Chapman
- Builder: Chapman and Campion, Whitby
- Launched: 1801
- Fate: Sold 1810

General characteristics
- Tons burthen: 406 (bm)
- Propulsion: Sails
- Armament: 8 × 18-pounder carronades

Majestic was launched at Whitby in 1801. She was London-based transport, though she also sailed to the Baltic. She was sold to the government in 1810.

== Career ==
Majestic first appeared in Lloyd's Register (LR) in 1801 with Nodding, master, E.Champion, owner, and trade London transport.

In 1805 her master was Richardson and her trade was Whitby–Baltic. She had damages repaired in 1803.

LR for 1810 showed her master as J. Nodding, changing to Richardson, and her trade as London–Whitby. She had a thorough repair as well.

In 1810 Chapman reportedly sold Majestic to the government, and her registration was shifted to London. However, LR continued to carry her to 1815 with Robinson as her master, Chapman as her owner, and her trade as London transport. She was no longer listed after 1815.
