= Caledonia (disambiguation) =

Caledonia is a Roman name of Celtic origin for most of the area that has become Scotland. Caledonia also often refers to:

- Caledonia, an old name for Scotland
- Caledonians, also known as Caledonii or Caledonia Confederacy, name given by historians to the Iron Age indigenous people of Scotland

Caledonia may also refer to:

== Places ==
=== Canada ===
==== Nova Scotia ====
- Caledonia, Nova Scotia (disambiguation)
- Caledonia, Nova Scotia, village in Canada
- Caledonia (St. Marys), Nova Scotia
- Caledonia Mills, community in Antigonish County
- Port Caledonia, community in Nova Scotia

==== Other places in canada ====
- Caledonia, Cape Breton
- Caledonia, New Brunswick
- Caledonia, Ontario
- Caledonia land dispute, also known as the Grand River land dispute
- Caledonia Mountain, mountain on the border of Alberta and British Columbia
- Caledonia Road, a street in Toronto
- Caledonia station, a subway station in Toronto, located on Caledonia Road
- New Caledonia (Canada), former North American fur-trading district
- Rural Municipality of Caledonia No. 99, Saskatchewan

=== United States ===
- Caledonia, Arkansas, an unincorporated community
- Caledonia, Illinois, a village
- Caledonia, Indiana, a ghost town
- Caledonia, Kentucky
- Caledonia, Michigan, a village
- Caledonia, Minnesota, a city
- Caledonia, Mississippi, a town
- Caledonia, Missouri, a village
- Caledonia, New York, a town
- Caledonia (village), New York
- Caledonia, North Dakota
- Caledonia, Ohio, a village
- Caledonia, Wisconsin, multiple locations
- Caledonia, Columbia County, Wisconsin, a town
- Caledonia, Racine County, Wisconsin, a village
- Caledonia, Trempealeau County, Wisconsin, a town
- Caledonia, Waupaca County, Wisconsin, a town
- Caledonia County, Vermont
- Caledonia Township, Illinois
- Caledonia Township, Alcona County, Michigan
- Caledonia Township, Kent County, Michigan
- Caledonia Township, Shiawassee County, Michigan
- Caledonia Township, Houston County, Minnesota

=== Other places ===
- Caledonia Cascade, waterfall in Rabun County, Georgia, US
- Caledonia Island, in Trinidad and Tobago
- Caledonia State Park, Pennsylvania, US
- Caledonian Canal, a canal in Scotland which connects the east and west coasts
- Caledonian Forest, former woodland forest in the highlands of Scotland
- Caledonian Ocean, archaic name for the north Atlantic Ocean
- New Caledonia, a group of islands in the Pacific Ocean
- New Caledonia, a short-lived Scottish colony established by the Darien scheme in what is now Panama

== Music ==
=== Albums ===
- Caledonia (Alan Roberts and Dougie MacLean album), 1978
- Caledonia, by Shana Morrison, 1998
- Caledonia (Suidakra album), 2006

=== Songs ===
- "Caledonia" (song), 1979, by Dougie MacLean, covered by Frankie Miller and many others
- "Caldonia" or "Caledonia", 1945, by Louis Jordan and his Tympany Five, covered by many others
- "Caledonia", by Cromagnon from their 1969 album Orgasm
- "Caledonia", by Amy MacDonald from her 2007 album This is The Life
- "Caledonia", by Robin Trower from his 1976 album Long Misty Days

== Schools ==
- Caledonia High School (disambiguation)
- Caledonia Junior High School, Dartmouth, Nova Scotia
- Caledonia Senior Secondary School, in Terrace, British Columbia
- College of New Caledonia, in British Columbia
- Glasgow Caledonian University, in Glasgow, Scotland

== Sports ==
- Caledonia AIA, soccer team from Trinidad and Tobago
- Caledonia Corvairs, Canadian junior ice hockey team based in Caledonia, Ontario
- Caledonia F.C., also known as Caledonian F.C. or Caleys, former U.S. soccer team from Detroit, Michigan
- Caledonian Stadium in Inverness, Scotland
- Inverness Caledonian Thistle F.C., Scottish soccer team
- North Caledonian Football League, amateur league in the Scottish highlands
- Royal Caledonian Curling Club, governing body of curling in Scotland

== Structures ==
- Caledonia Bridge (disambiguation)
- Caledonia Bridge (Caledonia, North Dakota)
- Caledonia Building, historic commercial building in Holyoke, Massachusetts
- Caledonia Dam, also known as the Grand River Dam, in Caledonia, Ontario, Canada
- Caledonia Farm, also known as Fountain Hall, historic home at Flint Hall, Rappahannock County, Virginia
- Caledonia House Hotel, also known as the Masonic Temple, historic hotel at Caledonia in Livingston County, New York
- Caledonia Mill, historic mill building in Caledonia, Ontario, Canada
- Caledonia State Prison Farm, North Carolina
- Star of Caledonia, a proposed sculpture near Gretna, Dumfries and Galloway, Scotland

== Transport ==
=== Airlines ===
- Caledonian Airways, Scottish airline formed in 1961
- Caledonian Airways (1988), charter airline, formed after British Airways acquired British Caledonian
- British Caledonian, formed in 1970 from a merger of Caledonian Airways and British United Airways

=== Railways ===
- Caledonian Railway, early 19th century Scottish railway
- Caledonian Railway (Brechin), private company formed by steam railway enthusiasts
- Caledonia, Manx Northern No. 4, later Isle of Man Railway No.15 Steam Locomotive, built in 1885
- Caledonian Sleeper, overnight sleeper train services between London and Scotland

=== Ships ===
- Caledonia (ship), a list of ships with the name
- HMS Caledonia, various ships and bases of the Royal Navy
- USS Caledonia, various ships of the US Navy
- Caledonian (ship), a list of ships with the name

== Other uses ==
- Caledonia (typeface)
- Caledonia Consulting, public affairs and communications firm in Edinburgh, Scotland
- Caledonia Investments, an investment trust on the London Stock Exchange
- Caledonian Brewery, formed in 1869 in Edinburgh
- Caledonian orogeny, a mountain building event that occurred during the Palaeozoic Era
- Caledonia, a junior synonym of Scotinotylus, a genus of spiders
- Caledonia, a character from Marvel Comics

== See also ==
- New Caledonia (disambiguation)
- Scotland (disambiguation)
- Scotia (disambiguation)
- Caledon (disambiguation)
- Calidonia (disambiguation), two corregimientos in Panama
