= New Britain (disambiguation) =

New Britain is an island and province in Papua New Guinea.

New Britain may also refer to:

== Places ==
- New Britain, Connecticut, United States
- New Britain, Pennsylvania, United States
  - New Britain station
  - New Britain Township, Pennsylvania
- New Britain (Canada), a historical name for Labrador and the shores of Hudson Bay and James Bay

== Music ==
- New Britain (album), by Whitehouse, 1982
- "New Britain" (tune), the melody associated with "Amazing Grace"

== Other ==
- New Britain Party, a political party
- New Labour, New Britain, the Labour Party’s slogan in the 1997 general election

== See also ==
- Britain (disambiguation)
- Names semantically and historically related to other similar names for British colonies, including:
  - New Britain (disambiguation)
  - New Albion (disambiguation)
    - New Scotland (disambiguation)
      - Nova Scotia (disambiguation)
      - New Albany (disambiguation)
      - New Caledonia (disambiguation)
    - New England (disambiguation)
      - New London (disambiguation)
    - New Wales (disambiguation)
