= New Albion (disambiguation) =

New Albion was England's claim of North America above New Spain.

New Albion may also refer to:

- New Albion (colony), an unsuccessful English colony in North America
- New Albion, New York, a town in Western New York
- New Albion Brewing Company, an early American microbrewery

== See also ==
- Albion (disambiguation)
- Because the name New Albion or Nova Albion means "New Britain", it is semantically and historically related to other similar names for British colonies, including:
  - New Britain (disambiguation)
  - New Albion (disambiguation)
    - New Scotland (disambiguation)
      - Nova Scotia (disambiguation)
      - New Albany (disambiguation)
      - New Caledonia (disambiguation)
    - New England (disambiguation)
    - New Wales (disambiguation)
