= New Albany =

New Albany is the name of several places in the United States of America:

== Localities ==
- New Albany, Indiana
- New Albany, Kansas
- New Albany, Mississippi
- New Albany, New Jersey
- New Albany, Ohio, a city in Franklin and Licking counties
- New Albany, Mahoning County, Ohio, an unincorporated community
- New Albany, Pennsylvania
- New Albany, Wisconsin, the former name of Beloit, Wisconsin

== Townships ==
- New Albany Township (disambiguation)

== Schools and school districts ==
- New Albany High School (Indiana)
- New Albany High School (Ohio)
- New Albany-Plain Local School District (Ohio)

== See also ==
- Albany (disambiguation)
- Because the name New Albany means "New Scotland", it is semantically and historically related to other similar names for British colonies, including:
  - New Britain (disambiguation)
  - New Albion (disambiguation)
    - New Scotland (disambiguation)
      - Nova Scotia (disambiguation)
      - New Albany (disambiguation)
      - New Caledonia (disambiguation)
    - New England (disambiguation)
    - New Wales (disambiguation)
- Scottish place names in other countries
