= Caledonia, New York =

- Town
- The Genesee Valley Greenway in Caledonia

- Location within New York Location within the United States
- Coordinates: 42°58′23″N 77°51′10″W
- Country: United States
- State: New York
- County: Livingston

Government
  - Town Supervisor: Daniel L. Pangrazio (R)
  - Town Clerk: Seth M. Graham (R)
  - Town Council: Members: Pamela Rychlicki (R); Todd Bickford (R); Quentin Clark (R); Kevin Keenan (R) (Caledonia 1st)

Area
  - Total: 44.13 sq mi (114.29 km^{2})
  - Land: 43.87 sq mi (113.63 km^{2})
  - Water: 0.25 sq mi (0.65 km^{2})

Population (2020)
  - Total: 4,154
  - Density: 94.68/sq mi (36.56/km^{2})
- Time zone: UTC-5 (EST)
  - Summer (DST): UTC-4 (EDT)
- ZIP Codes: 14423 (Caledonia); 14482 (Le Roy); 14546 (Scottsville)
- Area code: 585
- FIPS code: 36-051-11715
- Website: caledoniany.gov

Caledonia is a town in Livingston County, New York, United States. The population was 4,154 at the 2020 census. The town contains the village of Caledonia. The town is in the northwestern part of the county and is southwest of Rochester. It is part of the Rochester metropolitan area.

== History ==
The Seneca people long occupied much of present-day western New York, Pennsylvania and Ohio. They had a village in this area called "Canawaugus" (or Conawagus); it was located on the west side of the Genesee River. The site has since been absorbed by the town of Caledonia. Chief Cornplanter was born here around 1750 into the Wolf clan of his Seneca mother. His father was a Dutch fur trader, John Abeel, whose family had been established in Albany. Cornplanter was known as a statesman as well as a war chief, and he was influential in inviting Quakers to teach Seneca children on his land.

The first European-American settlements did not take place until around the 1790s, after the Revolutionary War. The Seneca, as allies of the defeated British, were forced to give up most of their land to the United States. The first known permanent white settlement began in 1797. The town of Caledonia was established in 1803 as the "Town of Southampton," having previously been known as "Northampton." Settlers from Scotland renamed it "Caledonia", the Latin name for Scotland, in 1806.

Part of the territory of the town was used to form the town of Bellona in 1812; its name was changed to Le Roy (Genesee County) in 1813. As the population increased, in 1819, another part of Caledonia was removed to form part of the town of York. The town of Wheatland (Monroe County) was formed from Caledonia in 1821.

== Points of Historical Interest ==
- Caledonia Fish Hatchery, first fish hatchery in the United States; listed on the National Register of Historic Places
- Caledonia House Hotel, listed on the National Register of Historic Places
- Clark-Keith House, listed on the National Register of Historic Places

== Notable people ==
- Governor Blacksnake (1700s-1859), Seneca war chief and leader, resided at Canawaugus
- Matt Cappotelli (1979–2018), professional wrestler
- Paul Cook (1863–1905), Major League Baseball player
- Cornplanter (c. 1730s-1836), Seneca war chief and diplomat
- Seth Green (1817–1888), pioneer in fish farming, established the first fish hatchery in North America at Caledonia in 1864
- Handsome Lake (1735–1815), Seneca religious leader
- Vivika Heino (1910–1995), noted ceramicist, born at Caledonia
- Elizabeth Martha Olmsted (1825–1910), poet

== Geography ==
According to the United States Census Bureau, the town has a total area of 44.1 square miles (114.3 km^{2}), of which 43.9 square miles (113.6 km^{2}) are land and 0.3 square miles (0.7 km^{2}), or 0.57%, are water.

The north town line is the border of Monroe County, and the west town line is the border of Genesee County.

New York State Route 5 is an east–west route in the town. US Route 20 also crosses the southeast part of the town from west to east. New York State Route 36, a north–south highway, intersects both of these highways.

The Genesee River helps define the east town line.

=== Adjacent towns and areas ===
(Clockwise)

- Wheatland
- Rush; Avon
- York
- Pavilion; Le Roy

== Demographics ==
Historical population
Census	Pop.	Note	%±
1820	2,645		—
1830	1,618		−38.8%
1840	1,987		22.8%
1850	1,804		−9.2%
1860	2,014		11.6%
1870	1,813		−10.0%
1880	1,927		6.3%
1890	2,188		13.5%
1900	2,072		−5.3%
1910	2,248		8.5%
1920	1,988		−11.6%
1930	2,305		15.9%
1940	2,009		−12.8%
1950	2,529		25.9%
1960	3,067		21.3%
1970	3,832		24.9%
1980	4,034		5.3%
1990	4,441		10.1%
2000	4,567		2.8%
2010	4,255		−6.8%
2016 (est.)	4,153	▼	−2.4%
U.S. Decennial Census

As of the census of 2000, there were 4,567 people, 1,671 households, and 1,268 families residing in the town. The population density was 103.5 inhabitants per square mile (40.0/km^{2}). There were 1,750 housing units at an average density of 39.7 per square mile (15.3/km^{2}). The racial makeup of the town was 94.11% White, 3.50% Black or African American, 0.37% Native American, 0.53% Asian, 0.07% Pacific Islander, 0.18% from other races, and 1.25% from two or more races. Hispanic or Latino of any race were 0.83% of the population.

There were 1,671 households (out of which 39.4% had children under the age of 18 living with them), 61.3% were married couples living together, 9.9% had a female householder with no husband present, and 24.1% were non-families. 19.6% of all households were made up of individuals, and 8.1% had someone living alone who was 65 years of age or older. The average household size was 2.73, and the average family size was 3.13.

In the town, the population was spread out, with 28.1% under the age of 18, 7.1% from 18 to 24, 30.6% from 25 to 44, 23.4% from 45 to 64, and 10.8% who were 65 years of age or older. The median age was 37 years. For every 100 females, there were 100.5 males. For every 100 females age 18 and over, there were 99.0 males.

The median income for a household in the town was $46,359, and the median income for a family was $50,607. Males had a median income of $37,287 versus $28,159 for females. The per capita income for the town was $19,611. About 3.6% of families and 5.0% of the population were below the poverty line, including 8.0% of those under age 18 and 0.8% of those age 65 or over.

== Communities and locations in the Town of Caledonia ==
- Baker – A hamlet in the northeast part of the town.
- Caledonia – The village of Caledonia is near the north town line on NY-5 at the junction of NY-36.
- Caledonia Fish Hatchery – A state fish breeding location by the north town line, north of Caledonia village on NY-36.
- Canawaugus – A hamlet in the southeast part of town on NY-5. It was a former Seneca village.
- Maxwell – A hamlet in the northeast part of the town.
- Menzie Crossing – A hamlet northeast of Caledonia village near the north town line.
- Taylor – A hamlet south of Caledonia village on NY-36.
- Toggletown – A hamlet on the south town line, on US-20.

== Community amenities ==
Caledonia's high school is Caledonia-Mumford Central School, or Cal-Mum. The school's athletic teams are known as the Raiders.

The Caledonia Fire Department was established in 1887, existing until recently as both a rural fire commission and a village fire department. Currently the Caledonia Fire District is the elected body which provides oversight and for financial needs of the emergency operations. The fire department provides manpower for the fire district and holds social events and fundraisers for the benefit of the membership. In 2013 the Caledonia Fire Department responded to 233 calls for service. More information regarding the Caledonia Fire District can be found at caledoniafiredistrict.org and on Facebook.

Ambulance services are provided by CHS Mobile Integrated Healthcare providing ambulance transport and advanced life support response. These services are available for both the village and town residents and currently housed at 3338 Caledonia-Avon Road.
