= Scotland (disambiguation) =

Scotland is a country that is part of the United Kingdom and forms the northern third of the island of Great Britain in North-West Europe.

Scotland may also refer to:

== Government in Scotland ==
- Scottish Government
- Kingdom of Scotland, a sovereign state from the 9th century to 1707
- Scotland (European Parliament constituency)

== Other places ==
=== Australia ===
- Scotland Island, New South Wales

=== Canada ===
- Scotland, Ontario, municipality in County of Brant

=== England ===
- Scotland, Lincolnshire, a hamlet adjacent to Ingoldsby
- Scotland Road, a road in Liverpool

=== United States ===
- Scotland, Arkansas
- Scotland, Connecticut
- Scotland, Florida
- Scotland, Georgia
- Scotland, Indiana
- Scotland, Maryland
- Scotland, Mississippi
- Scotland, Missouri
- Scotland, Pennsylvania
- Scotland, South Dakota
- Scotland, Texas
- Scotland, Virginia
- Scotland County, Missouri
- Scotland County, North Carolina
- Scotland Neck, North Carolina
- Scotland Run, a river in the New Jersey, United States

== People ==
- Alexander Scotland, British Army and intelligence officer
- Egon Scotland, German journalist
- Jason Scotland, Trinidad and Tobago footballer
- Joe Scotland, Negro league baseball player
- Patricia Scotland, Baroness Scotland of Asthal, Labour Party life peer

== Arts, entertainment, and media ==
- "Scotland" (The Goodies), an episode of a British comedy television series
- "Scotland" (Walking Britain's Lost Railways), a TV documentary episode
- "Scotland" by the Lumineers, the opening theme of the TV series Reign
- BBC Scotland, division of the BBC, which is responsible for broadcasting in Scotland
- Scotland, PA, a 2002 film

== Sports ==
- List of national sports teams of Scotland
- Scotland at the Commonwealth Games, a Commonwealth Games team
- Scottish cricket team
- Scotland national basketball team
- Scotland national football team
- Scotland national rugby league team
- Scotland national rugby union team

== Other uses ==
- Bank of Scotland, a commercial and clearing bank based in Edinburgh

== See also ==
- Scotia
- Caledonia
- Scotland Yard
- Scotia (disambiguation)
- Caledonia (disambiguation)
- New Scotland (disambiguation)
- Scotland County (disambiguation)
- Scotland Township (disambiguation)
