= Scotta =

Scotta is a surname. It may refer to:

- Enrico Scotta (born 1949), Italian painter and sculptor
- Frida Scotta (1871–1948), the stage name of Danish violinist Frida von Kaulbach (1871–1948)
- Giancarlo Scottà (b. 1953), Italian politician
- Héctor Scotta (b. 1950), Argentine footballer
- Néstor Scotta (1948–2001), Argentine footballer
- Valentino Fattore Scotta (born 2001), Argentine footballer

== See also ==
- Scota
- Scotia (disambiguation)
- Scottia (disambiguation)
