= Caledonia, Nova Scotia (disambiguation) =

Caledonia, Nova Scotia is a community in Region of Queens Municipality, Nova Scotia, Canada.

Caledonia, Nova Scotia may also refer to the following places in Canada:

- Caledonia, Guysborough County, Nova Scotia
- Caledonia, Cape Breton

== See also ==
- Caledonia Junction, Nova Scotia, Canada
- Caledonia Mills, Nova Scotia, Canada
- Port Caledonia, Canada
