= New Albany Township =

New Albany Township may refer to the following places:

United States

- New Albany Township, Floyd County, Indiana
- New Albany Township, Story County, Iowa

== See also ==
- New Albany (disambiguation)
