= Caledon =

Caledon can refer to:

== Places ==
=== South Africa ===
- Caledon, Western Cape, a town in South Africa
- Caledon River in South Africa

=== Elsewhere ===
- Caledon, County Tyrone in Northern Ireland
- Caledon, Ontario in Canada
- Caledon Bay in Arnhem Land, in the Northern Territory of Australia
- Caledonian Forest in Scotland, sometimes called the Great Wood of Caledon

== Other ==
- Caledon, an alternate name of the Mandora, a musical instrument
- Caledon Shipbuilding & Engineering Company, a company in Scotland
- Caledon Du Pré, English politician

== See also ==
- Calydon, an ancient Greek city
- Calydon (genus), a genus of beetles
- Caledonia
