= Elizabeth M. Olmsted =

American poet (1825–1910)

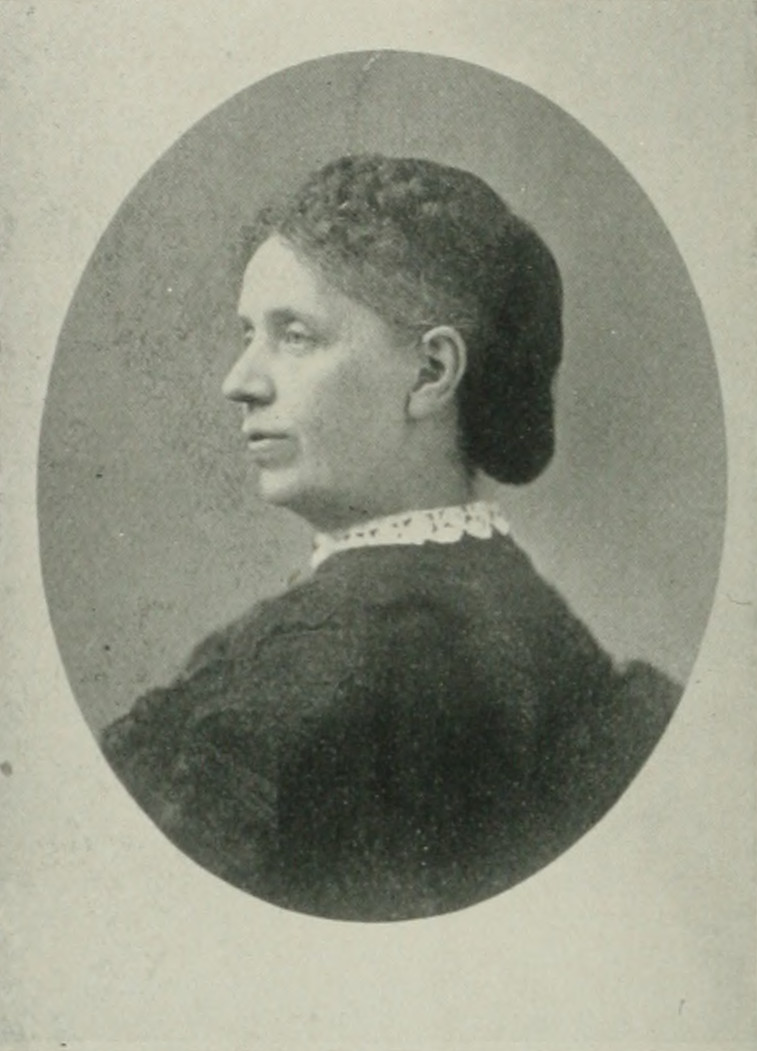
- "A Woman of the Century"
- Born: Elizabeth Martha Allen; December 31, 1825 Caledonia, New York, U.S.
- Died: February 7, 1910 (aged 84) Buffalo, New York, U.S.
- Resting place: Machpelah Cemetery, Le Roy, New York
- Occupation: Poet
- Language: English
- Notable works: Poems of the house, and other poems
- Spouse: R. C Parker (m. 1862; died 1866)
- Relatives: Ethan Allen

Elizabeth M. Olmsted (née, Allen; December 31, 1825 – February 7, 1910) was an American poet of the long nineteenth century from New York. She began writing poetry at a young age. Her poems were widely published during the Civil War in newspapers and magazines, such as The Independent, and included popular works such as “Our Boys Going to the War,” “The Clarion,” and “The Upas.” In addition to her war lyrics, she published sonnets and a collection titled Poems of the House, and Other Poems (1903). She married John R. Olmsted in 1853 and spent most of her life in Le Roy, New York.

== Biography ==
Elizabeth Martha Allen was born in Caledonia, New York, December 31, 1825. Her ancestral stock was from Pittsfield, Massachusetts. Her father, Oliver Allen, belonged to the family of Ethan Allen. She was educated carefully and liberally. She was a child of strong mental powers and inquiring mind. Her poetic trend was apparent in childhood, and in her youth she wrote poems of much merit. She married, in February, 1853, John R. Olmsted, of Le Roy, New York, and she resided in that town thereafter. The Olmsleds descended from the first settlers of Hartford, Connecticut, and pioneers of the Genesee valley.

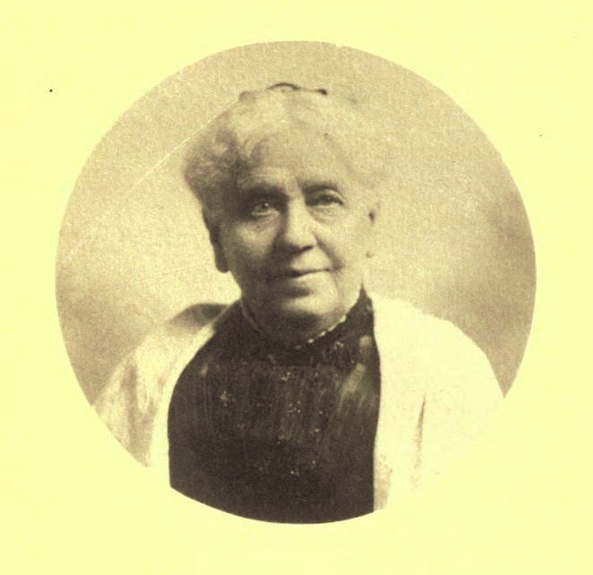
1903

Olmsted contributed to the New York City weekly Independent and other papers. During the Civil War, she wrote many spirited war lyrics, among which was the once well-known "Our Boys Going to the War" and "The Clarion." Her poem, "The Upas," first appeared in the Independent of January 16, 1862. She published a number of excellent sonnets. Her productions were characterized by moral tone, fine diction and polish.

She died at her son's home in Buffalo, New York, on February 7, 1910, and was buried at Machpelah Cemetery, Le Roy, New York.

== Selected works ==
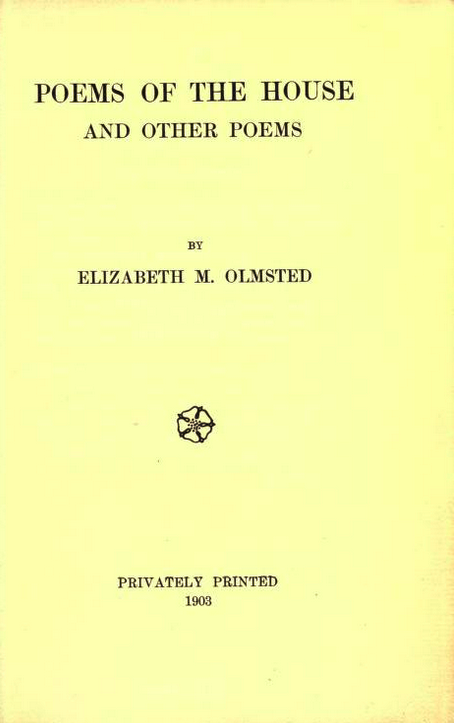
Poems of the House (1903)

- Poems of the house, and other poems, 1903
