= Caledonia (village), New York =

Caledonia, New York
- Village
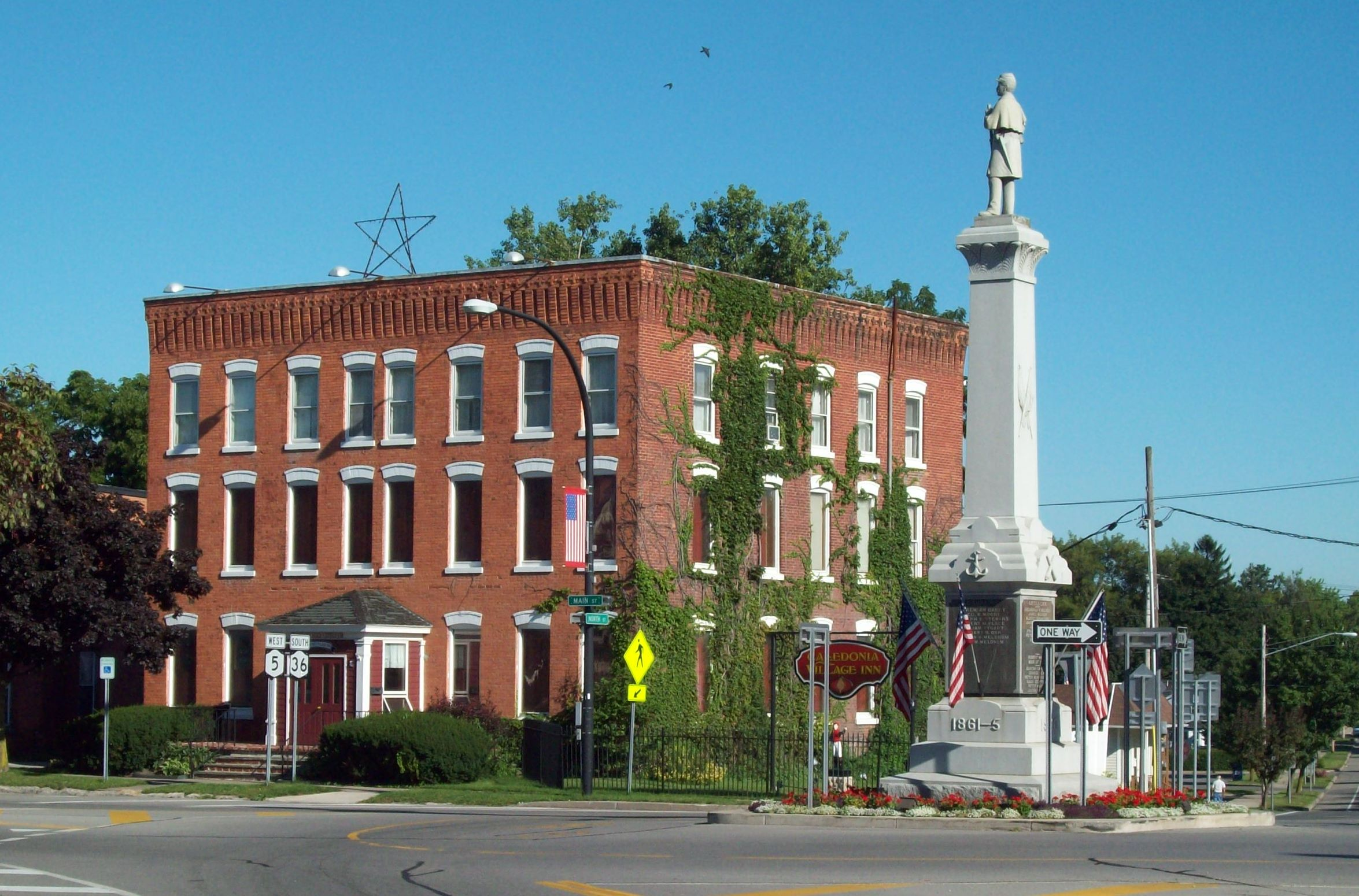
- Caledonia Village Inn and Civil War monument, August 2010

- Location within New York Location within the United States
- Coordinates: 42°58′25″N 77°51′16″W
- Country: United States
- State: New York
- County: Livingston
- Town: Caledonia

Government
  - Town Clerk: Seth Graham
  - Town Supervisor: Daniel Pangrazio
  - Village Clerk: Ann Marie Grattan
  - Mayor: Scott Diliberto

Area
  - Total: 2.10 sq mi (5.43 km^{2})
  - Land: 2.10 sq mi (5.43 km^{2})
  - Water: 0 sq mi (0.00 km^{2})
- Elevation: 650 ft (200 m)

Population (2020)
  - Total: 2,080
  - Density: 991.3/sq mi (382.73/km^{2})
- Time zone: UTC-5 (EST)
  - Summer (DST): UTC-4 (EDT)
- ZIP Code: 14423
- Area code: 585
- FIPS code: 36-11704
- Website: villageofcaledoniany.gov

Caledonia is a village in the town of Caledonia, Livingston County, New York, United States. The population was 2,080 at the 2020 census, out of 4,154 in the entire town. The name Caledonia refers to Scotland.

== History ==
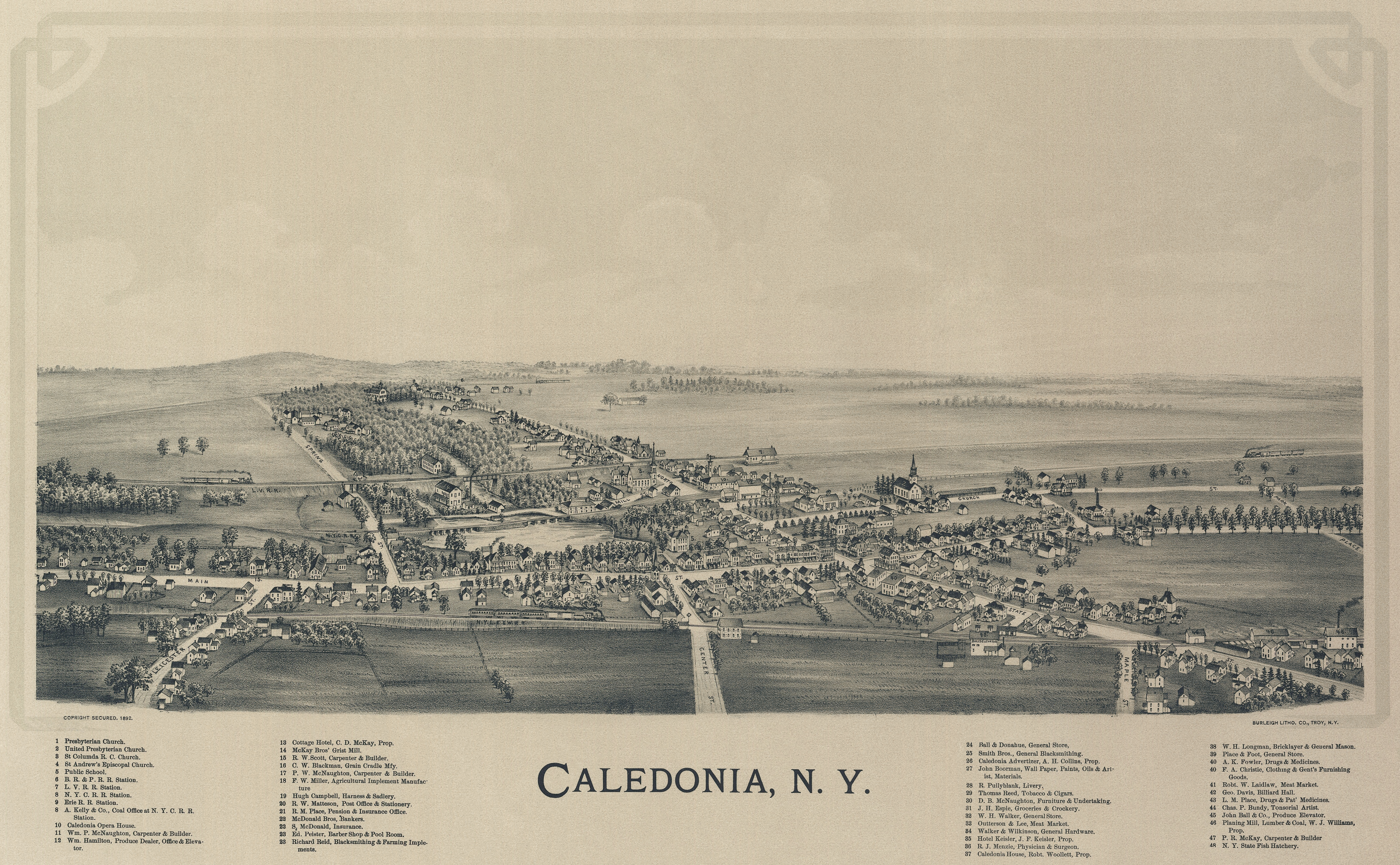
Aerial depiction of Caledonia, c. 1892

The town was settled around 1797 by families from Scotland. In 1803, the town was incorporated into New York as "Southampton". The name later changed to "Caledonia". The village of Caledonia was incorporated in 1891.

The village forms many associations with the adjacent hamlet of Mumford (town of Wheatland), even though they are in different counties. Wheatland was formed as the town of Inverness from the town of Caledonia in 1821. Inverness' name later changed to "Wheatland", as the town did not share the Scottish ancestry of Caledonia.

The fish hatchery at the north end of Caledonia village was built by Seth Green and is the oldest in the United States.

The Caledonia Fish Hatchery, Caledonia House Hotel and Clark-Keith House are listed on the National Register of Historic Places.

=== Notable people ===
- Angus Cameron, member of the United States Senate from Wisconsin; born in Caledonia
- Matt Cappotelli, former professional wrestler

=== Government ===
Caledonia is made up of a Village and a Town. The current officials are: Daniel Pangrazio (Town Supervisor), Seth Graham (Town Clerk), Scott DiLiberto (Mayor), and Ann Marie Grattan (Village Clerk).

== Geography ==
Caledonia is located in the northernmost part of Livingston County at 42°58′25″N 77°51′15″W (42.973621, -77.854309). It is 20 miles (32 km) southwest of Rochester, 17 miles (27 km) east of Batavia and 14 miles (23 km) north of Geneseo, the Livingston county seat.

According to the United States Census Bureau, the village has a total area of 2.1 square miles (5.4 km^{2}), all land. The Caledonia Fish Hatchery is at the north end of the village along an unnamed creek that flows north to Oatka Creek in Mumford and is part of the Genesee River watershed.

New York State Route 36 intersects New York State Route 5 in Caledonia.

== Demographics ==
Historical population
Census	Pop.	Note	%±
1840	450		—
1850	500		11.1%
1860	623		24.6%
1870	597		−4.2%
1900	1,073		—
1910	1,290		20.2%
1920	1,170		−9.3%
1930	1,487		27.1%
1940	1,226		−17.6%
1950	1,683		37.3%
1960	1,917		13.9%
1970	2,327		21.4%
1980	2,188		−6.0%
1990	2,262		3.4%
2000	2,327		2.9%
2010	2,201		−5.4%
2020	2,080		−5.5%
U.S. Decennial Census

At the 2000 census, there were 2,327 people, 902 households and 645 families residing in the village. The population density was 1,089.7 per square mile (420.7/km^{2}). There were 939 housing units at an average density of 439.7 per square mile (169.8/km^{2}). The racial makeup was 93.47% White, 3.95% Black or African American, 0.21% Native American, 0.69% Asian, 0.26% from other races, and 1.42% from two or more races. Hispanic or Latino of any race were 0.95% of the population.

There were 902 households, of which 37.7% had children under the age of 18 living with them, 56.8% were married couples living together, 11.2% had a female householder with no husband present, and 28.4% were non-families. 24.3% of all households were made up of individuals, and 10.9% had someone living alone who was 65 years of age or older. The average household size was 2.57 and the average family size was 3.06.

27.4% of the population were under the age of 18, 7.3% from 18 to 24, 29.0% from 25 to 44, 23.5% from 45 to 64, and 12.8% who were 65 years of age or older. The median age was 38 years. For every 100 females, there were 95.9 males. For every 100 females age 18 and over, there were 91.7 males.

The median household income was $44,309 and the median family income was $50,526. Males had a median income of $38,587 and females $27,917. The per capita income was $19,753. About 4.4% of families and 5.2% of the population were below the poverty line, including 7.4% of those under age 18 and 1.2% of those age 65 or over.

== Community amenities ==
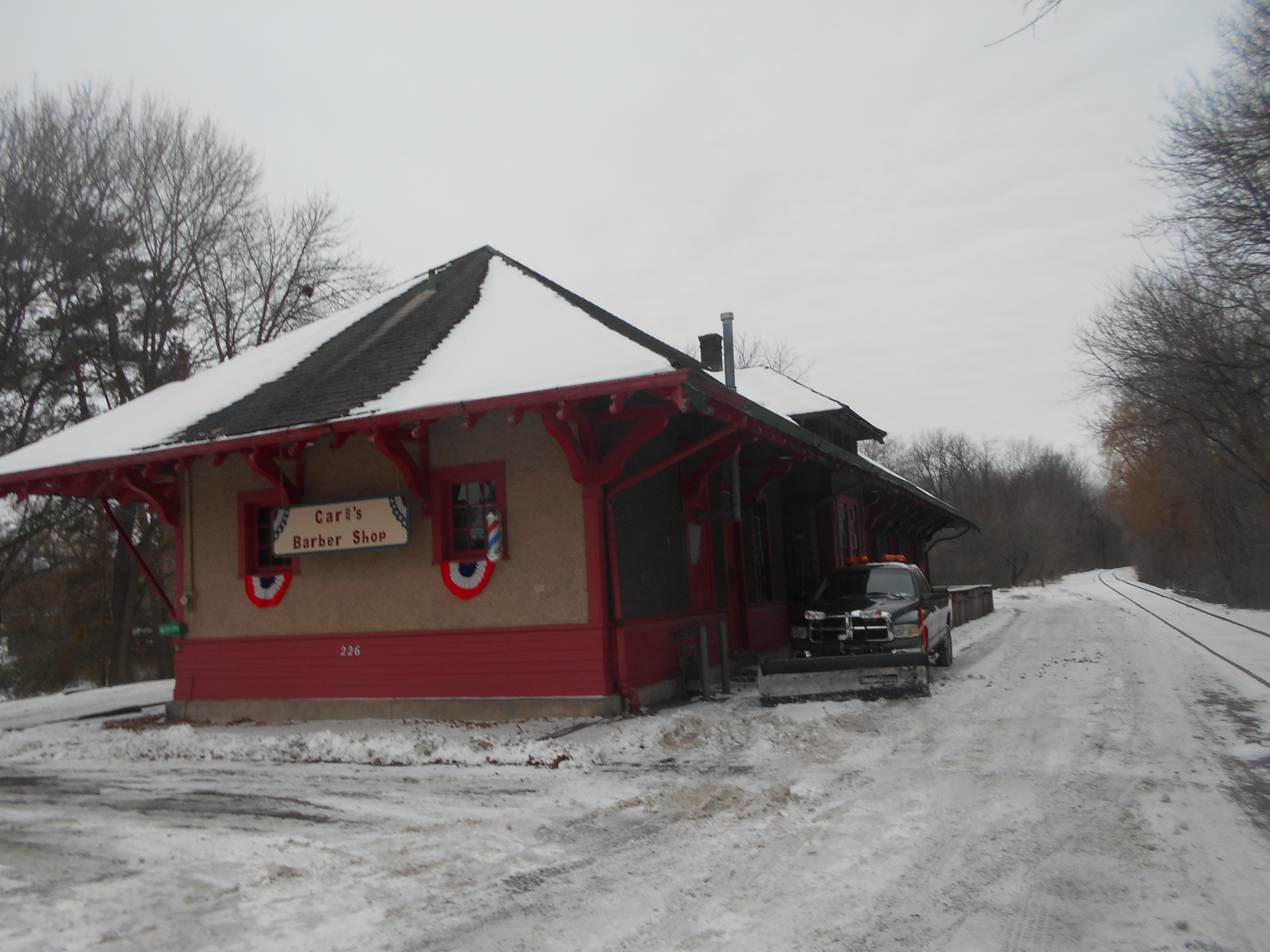
Caledonia's former station for the New York Central Railroad, the location of a barber shop in January 2014

Caledonia's high school is Caledonia-Mumford Central School. The school's athletic teams are known as the Raiders.

The Caledonia Fire Department was established in 1887, existing until recently as both a Rural Fire Commission and a Village Fire Department. Currently, the Caledonia Fire District is the elected body which provides oversight and for financial needs of the emergency operations. The Fire Department provides manpower for the Fire District and holds social events and fund raisers for the benefit of the membership.

Ambulance services are provided by Genesee Valley Emergency Medical Services providing two ambulances and one advanced life support fly car. These services are available for both the village and town residents and reside within the Caledonia Fire District fire hall.
