= Platres =

Platres: Πλάτρες (Greek); Platres (Turkish); Πάνω Πλάτρες (Greek) Yukarı Platres (Turkish)
- Village
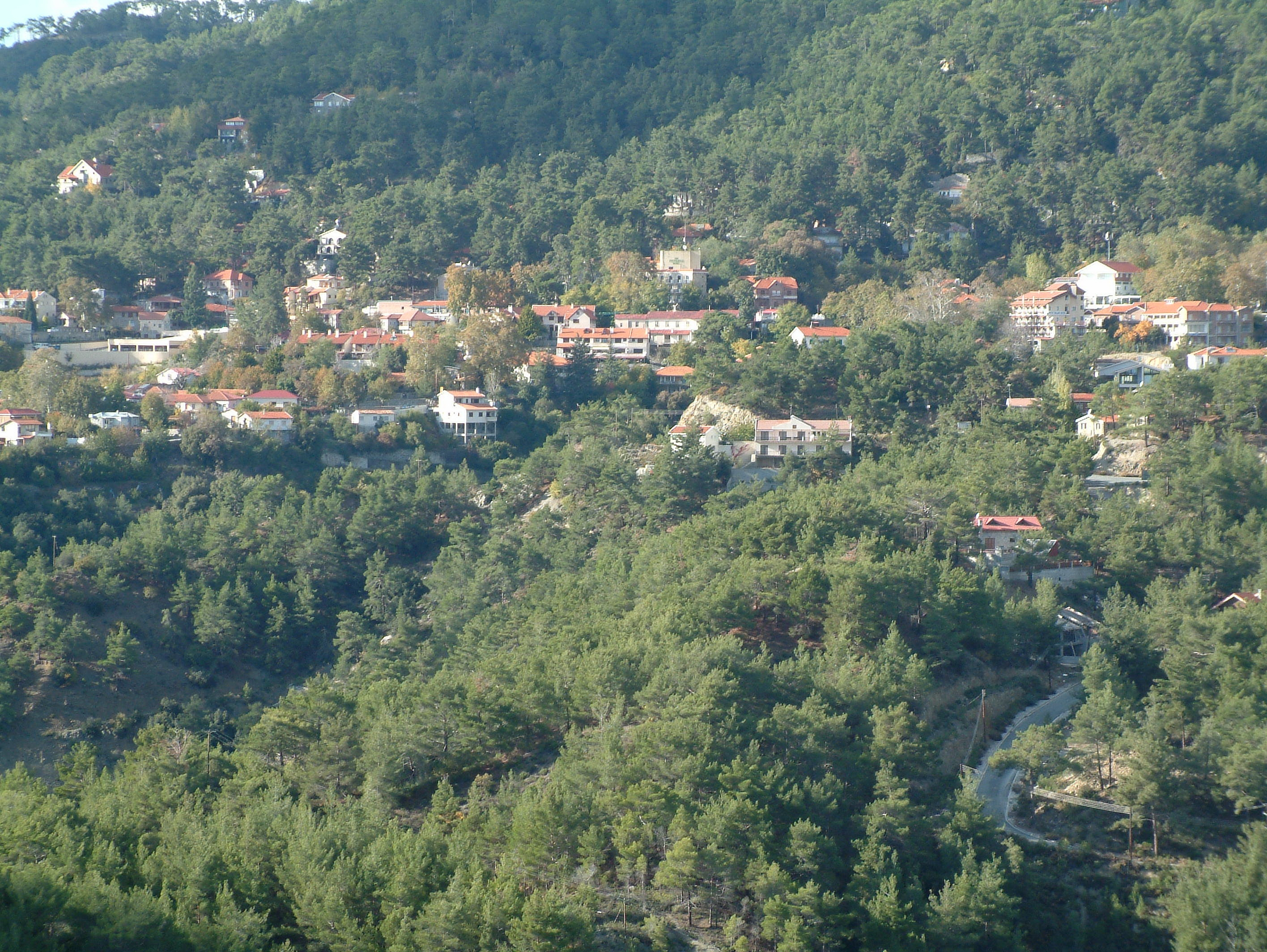
- Platres
- Motto(s): In Platres, the nightingales will not let you sleep - Τ' αηδόνια δε σ' αφήνουνε να κοιμηθείς στις Πλάτρες (Giorgos Seferis/Γιώργος Σεφέρης, 1955)
- Location within Cyprus
- Coordinates: 34°53′13″N 32°51′46″E
- Country: Cyprus
- District: Limassol
- Elevation: 1,200 m (3,900 ft)

Population (2021)
  - Total: 200
- Time zone: UTC+2 (EET)
- Postal code: CY-4820
- Website: http://www.platres.org.cy

Platres (Greek: Πλάτρες) or Pano Platres (Greek: Πάνω Πλάτρες; Turkish: Yukarı Platres; English: Upper Platres), is a Μountainous village in Cyprus. It is located on the southern slopes of the Troodos Mountains and is one of the wine villages (Greek: κρασοχώρια, krasochoria). Platres is the largest Troodos resort, situated about 5km from Troodos Square, 25 kilometers (16 mi) north-west of Limassol and 45 kilometers (28 mi) south-west of the capital Nicosia. Platres is a very old village and is mentioned among the 119 villages of the Limassol district that existed during the Lusignan Era (1192-1489 AD) and the Venetian Era (1489-1571 AD). Platres is the principal hill resort of Cyprus. The town has a resident population of fewer than 300, but this can swell to 10,000 during tourist seasons.

The village is often called Pano Platres after the village of Tornarides, which is a smaller residential settlement situated some 3 km to the south-west, was renamed Kato Platres (Greek: Κάτω Πλάτρες; English: Lower Platres). Locals still continue to refer to Pano Platres as just Platres.

== History ==
In the past the villagers were mainly shepherds and vine growers. Later most vine fields were converted to orchards, producing cherries, apples, pears, peaches and more. However, since the early 20th century many people have dedicated themselves to the booming tourism sector. Platres has been a popular hill resort since the British took control of the island of Cyprus in 1878. In the arid hills of the Troödos range, Platres is relatively unusual in straddling a perennial stream, providing a reliable source of drinking water and allowing a profusion of foliage not commonly seen on the island. Importing their taste for cool retreats, away from the heat of the coast, the colonial settlers rapidly established a network of hotels, bars and shady walks around the small village that previously existed on the site.

Over the years, Platres gained a reputation as the destination for notable people, including King Farouk of Egypt and the Nobel Prize-winning poet Giorgos Seferis. The Brandy Sour cocktail, a drink intimately associated with Cypriot cuisine, was developed for King Farouk during the late 1930s, at the Forest Park Hotel which is situated in Platres. The same hotel is also known as the location at which British writer Daphne du Maurier composed the majority of her novel Rebecca. These are some of the reasons that Platres have been recently called "The Village of Kings and Poets".

== Tourism and amenities ==
The resort retains many hotels and bars, and operates as both a cooler alternative to the major coastal resorts during the summer, and as a skiing base during winter months for the nearby ski slopes of Mount Olympus.

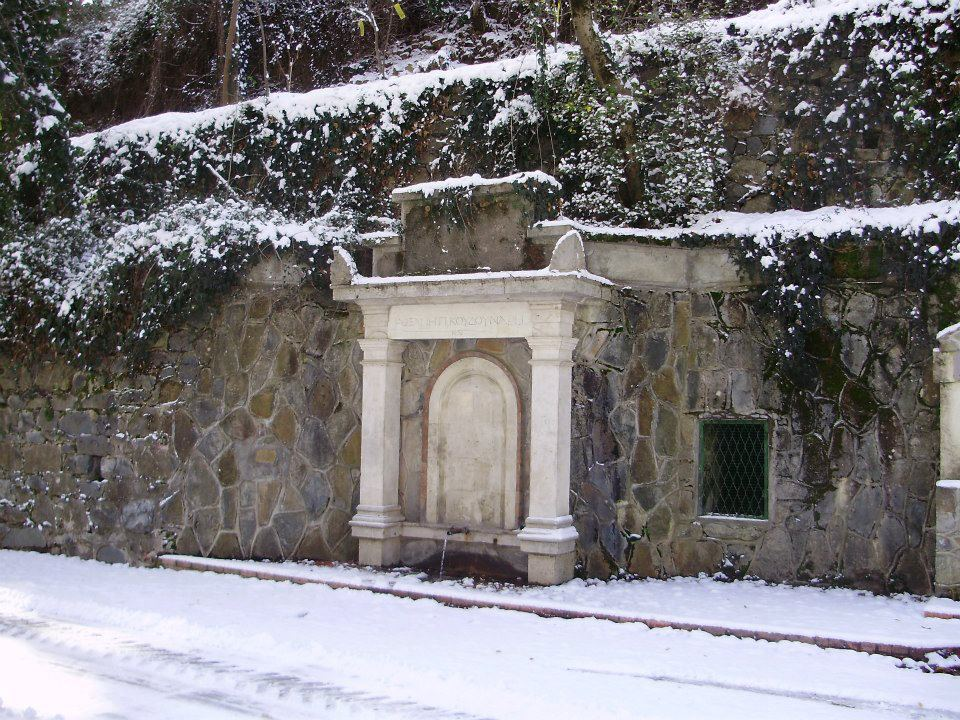
Fountain of Roxanne Koudounaris in the Winter

Platres are the starting point for several nature trails as well as the Troodos Cycling Routes. Through the path of the Troodos Cycling routes, as well as some of other hiking trails is the area of Ayia Irini (located in the northeast of the village on the road leading from Psilodentro Area to Mesa Potamos). From the rock of Ayia Irini visitors can see Platres village. It is said that in the area during the Middle Ages (Frank Rule) a Frank monastery with a small settlement existed at the area.

Nature trails include the Kalidonia Nature Trail which passes from the Caledonia Waterfalls (Greek: Καταρράκτης της Καληδονίας (των Καληδονιών), Turkish: Kaledonya Şelalesi) as well as the Millomeris Nature Trail that leads to the Millomeris Waterfall (Greek: Καταρράκτης του Μιλλομέρη).

The village Old Municipal Market was renovated in the last years and transformed into a Cultural Center. The main area was renamed at Giorgos Seferis Hall and it can host exhibitions, conferences, seminars, concerts, plays and audio-visual projections.

Platres Athletic Sports Center (Greek: Αθλητικό Κέντρο Πλατρών) is located at an altitude of 1050m in the Troodos Mountains. This sports center has a football pitch, mini football, basketball, tennis, volleyball, handball, bicycle center as well as fitness and Spa facilities. It has locker rooms and a coffee shop. The center hosts the yearly 'Cyprus Junior Tennis Tournament', 'Cyprus Downhill Race' as well as other tournaments. Its football pitch is the main practice location for most of the Cyprus 1st division football teams during the hot months of Cyprus. A bicycle center, in combination with the nearby Milia Bridge Trail (used by MTB Cyprus Downhill community in addition to hikers), the Troodos Cycling Routes and all the year round events have made the Platres Athletic Sports Center one of the landmarks on all year round sports.

Milia Bridge (Greek: Γεφύρι της Μηλιάς) is one of the old surviving landmarks that still stand intact. It's situated just below the village inside the forest. It provided a crossing point over Krios Potamos. Krios Potamos (Greek: Κρυός Ποταμός) (Krios River) starts at Mount Olympus peak and is the life giving river of Platres, since it is one of the very few rivers in Cyprus that flow all year round.

== Notable people ==
- Paul Stassino, 1930-2012, actor

== Gallery ==
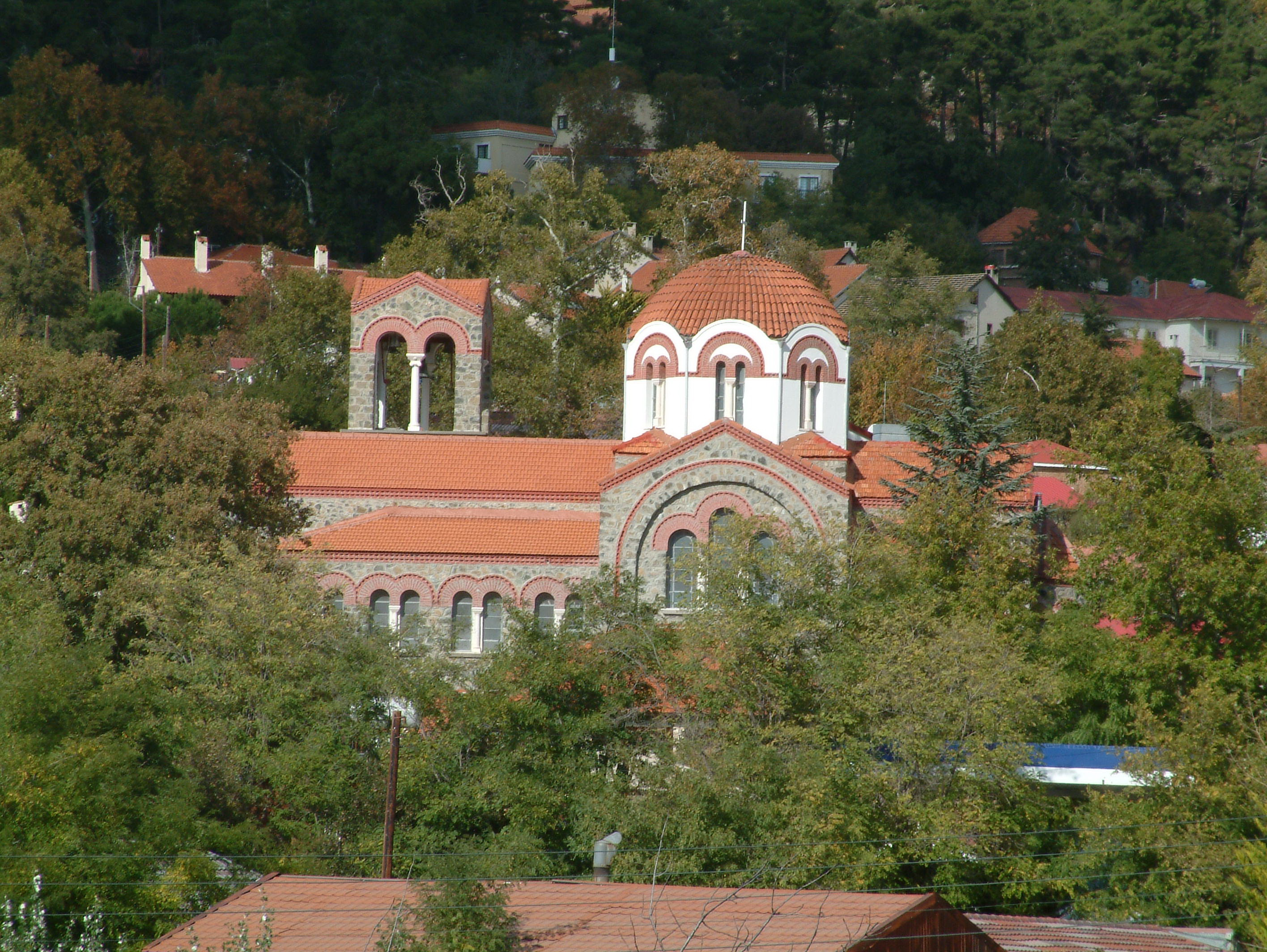
Panayia Faneromenis Holy Church

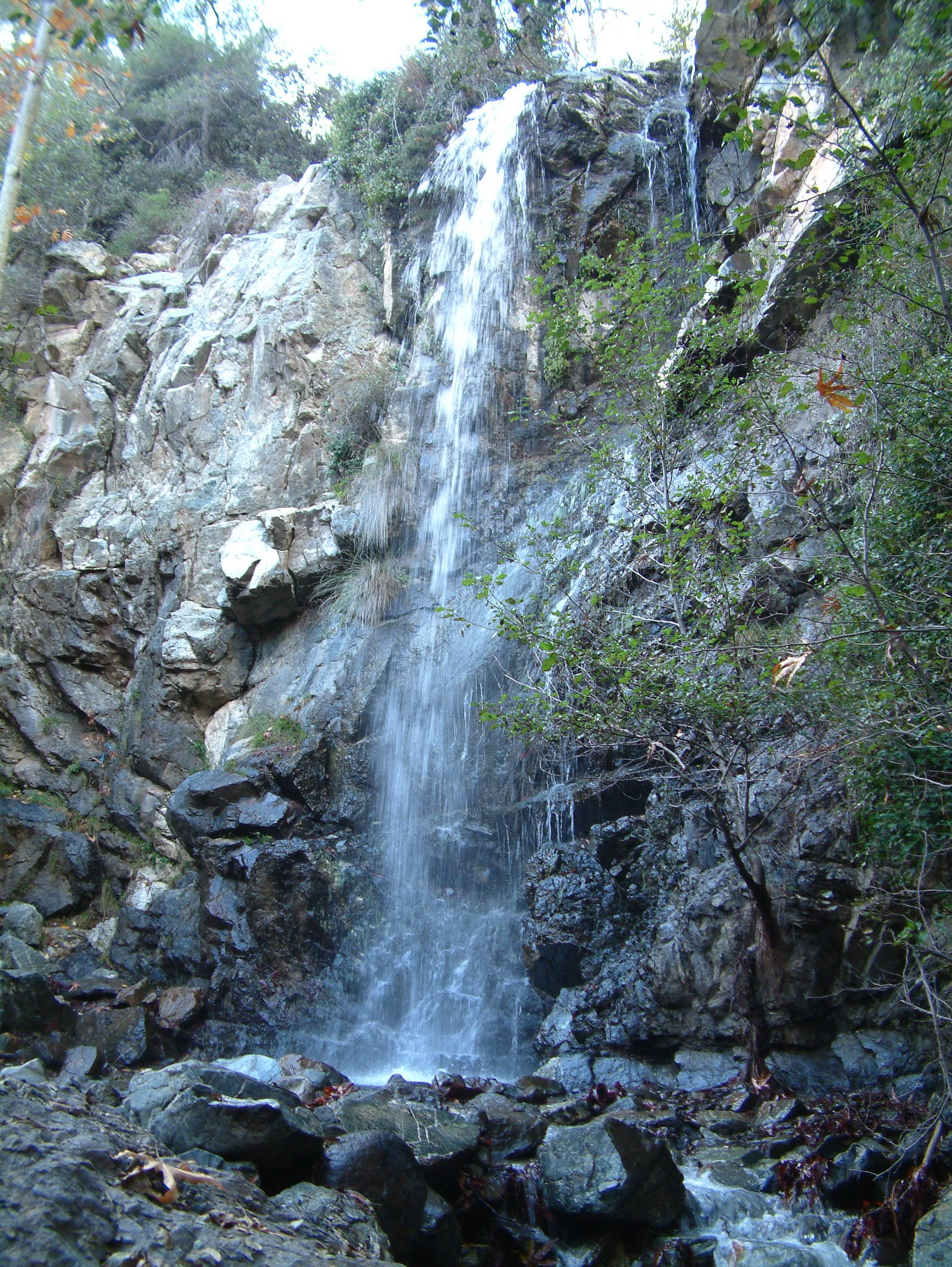
Kalidonia Waterfall

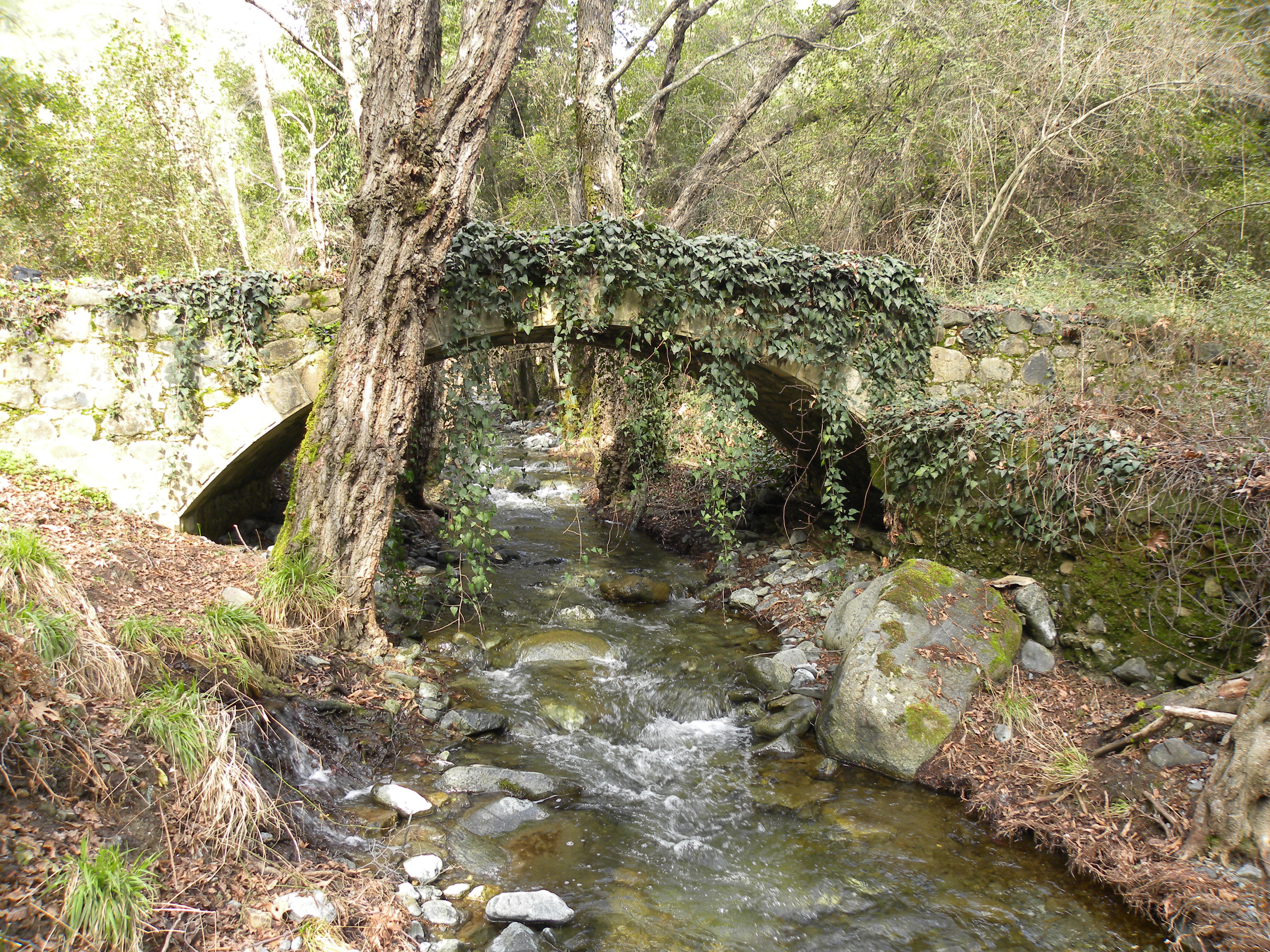
Milia Bridge

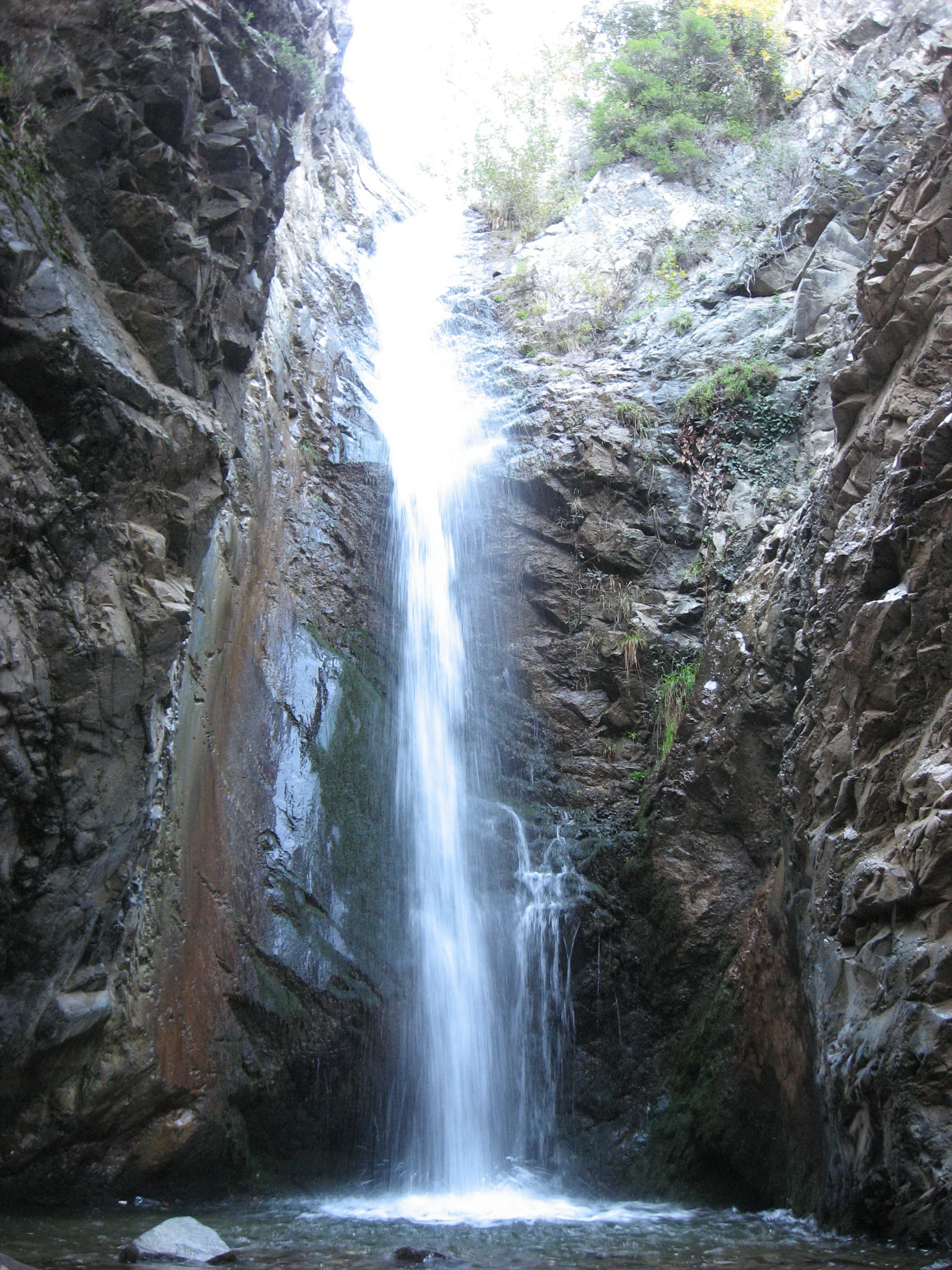
Millomeris Waterfall

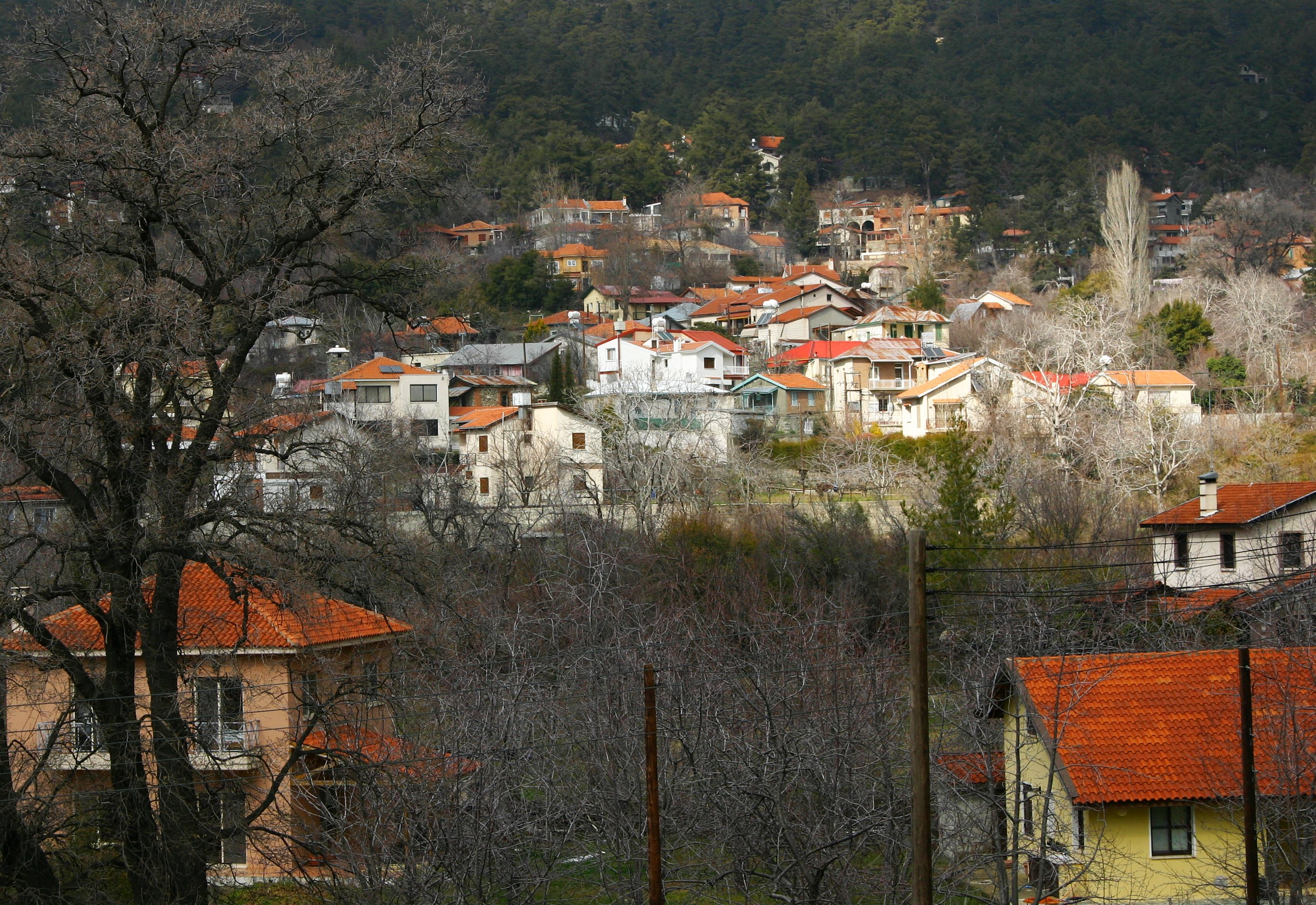
Platres in the winter

== Climate ==
Climate data for Platres (1200 metres above sea level)
Month	Jan	Feb	Mar	Apr	May	Jun	Jul	Aug	Sep	Oct	Nov	Dec	Year
Mean daily maximum °C (°F)	9.8 (49.6)	10.3 (50.5)	14.4 (57.9)	16.8 (62.2)	20.8 (69.4)	24.4 (75.9)	26.1 (79.0)	27.3 (81.1)	23.9 (75.0)	19.7 (67.5)	13.8 (56.8)	11.0 (51.8)	18.2 (64.7)
Mean daily minimum °C (°F)	2.1 (35.8)	1.2 (34.2)	5.5 (41.9)	10.1 (50.2)	13.1 (55.6)	16.4 (61.5)	18.7 (65.7)	18.5 (65.3)	15.1 (59.2)	12.2 (54.0)	9.2 (48.6)	4.5 (40.1)	10.5 (51.0)
Average precipitation mm (inches)	155.1 (6.11)	114.9 (4.52)	87.3 (3.44)	48.8 (1.92)	19.9 (0.78)	4.4 (0.17)	3.3 (0.13)	5.1 (0.20)	19.8 (0.78)	49.8 (1.96)	100.2 (3.94)	177.1 (6.97)	785.7 (30.93)
Average precipitation days	15.9	14.1	11.1	8.9	4.1	2.2	1.1	2.5	4.0	8.1	10.8	17.7	100.5
Average snowy days	3	4	1	0	0	0	0	0	0	0	1	2	11
