= Nova Scotia (ship) =

There have been several ships called Nova Scotia :

- HMS Nova Scotia, British Royal Navy ships
  - HMS Nova Scotia (1812)
- RMS Nova Scotia (1926), a Furness Withy British Royal Mail Ship
- RMS Nova Scotia (1947), replacement for 1926-built RMS Nova Scotia
- MV Nova Scotia, motor vessel named Nova Scotia, replacement for 1947-built RMS Nova Scotia

== See also ==
- Nova Scotia (disambiguation)
