= Scotia (disambiguation) =

Scotia is an ancient name for Scotland.

Scotia may also refer to:

== Places ==
=== In the United States ===
- Scotia, Arkansas, an unincorporated community
- Scotia, California, a census-designated place
- Scotia, Missouri, an unincorporated community
- Scotia, Nebraska, a village
- Scotia, New York, a village
- Scotia, Pennsylvania, a ghost town
- Scotia, South Carolina, a town

=== Elsewhere ===
- Scotia, New South Wales
- Scotia Arc, island arc system in the South Atlantic and Southern Oceans
- Scotia Sea, sea bounded by the Scotia Arc islands of the South Atlantic and Southern Oceans
- Scotia Plate, a tectonic plate
- Scotia Sanctuary, New South Wales, Australia
- Scotia's Grave, the reputed resting place of mythological Queen Scotia in Count Kerry, Ireland

== Other ==
- For ships, see List of ships named Scotia
- Scota, or Scotia, in Irish mythology the daughter of an Egyptian Pharaoh
- Scotia (moth), genus of moths of the family Noctuidae
- Scotia, a type of decorative molding
- Scotiabank
- Scotia, a sorceress and primary antagonist in Lands of Lore: The Throne of Chaos

== See also ==
- The Scotian (train), former Via Rail route
- The Scotians, referring to the North Preston's Finest gang
- Nova Scotia, a province of Canada
- Nova Scotia (disambiguation)
- Scottia (disambiguation)
- Scotta, a family surname
- Scotland (disambiguation)
- Caledonia (disambiguation)
