= Scotland, Maryland =

Scotland, Maryland may refer to:

- Scotland, St. Mary's County, Maryland
- Scotland, Montgomery County, Maryland

== See also ==
- Scotland (disambiguation)
- Maryland (disambiguation)
