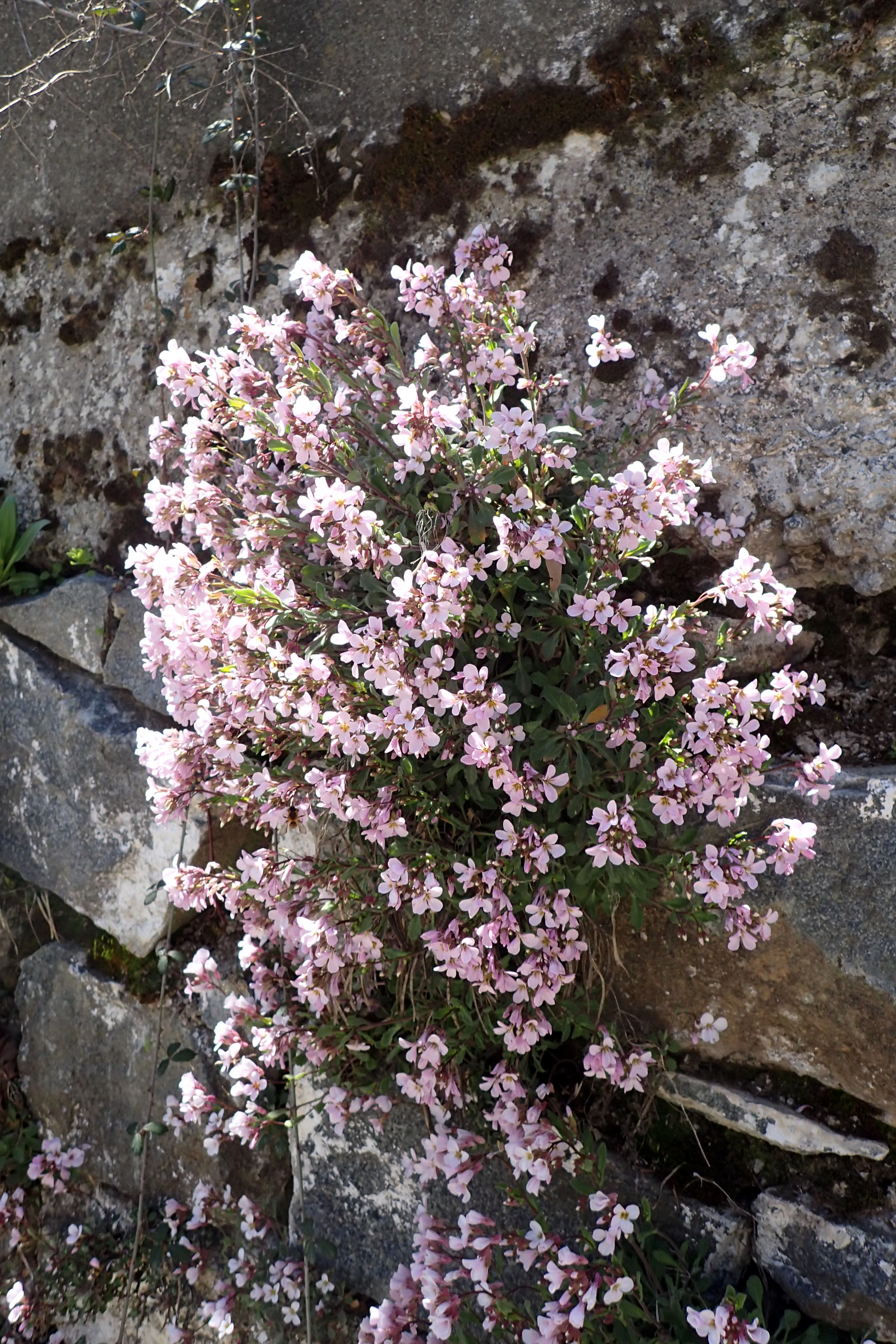
- Near Caledonia Waterfalls, Cyprus

Scientific classification
- Kingdom: Plantae
- Clade: Tracheophytes
- Clade: Angiosperms
- Clade: Eudicots
- Clade: Rosids
- Order: Brassicales
- Family: Brassicaceae
- Genus: Arabis
- Species: A. purpurea

Binomial name
- Arabis purpurea Sm.

Synonyms
- Aubrieta purpurea (Sm.) DC.; Erysimum purpureum (Sm.) Kuntze, nom. illeg.

= Arabis purpurea =

Species of plant

Arabis purpurea is a species of flowering plant in the cabbage family Brassicaceae, endemic to the Troodos Mountains in Cyprus. It was first described by James Edward Smith in 1813.

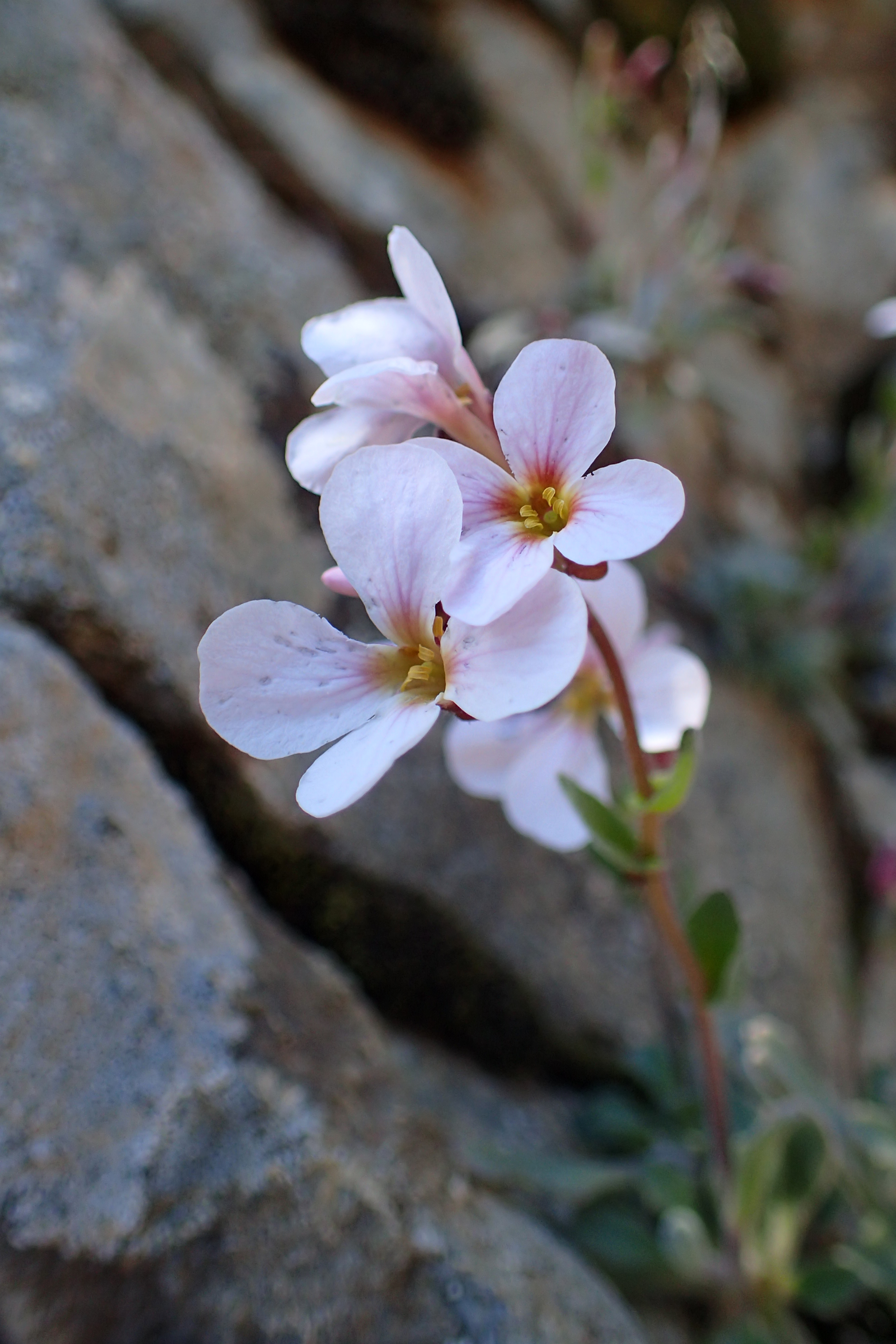
Flowers
