= Clark–Keith House =

Historic house in New York, United States

- U.S. National Register of Historic Places
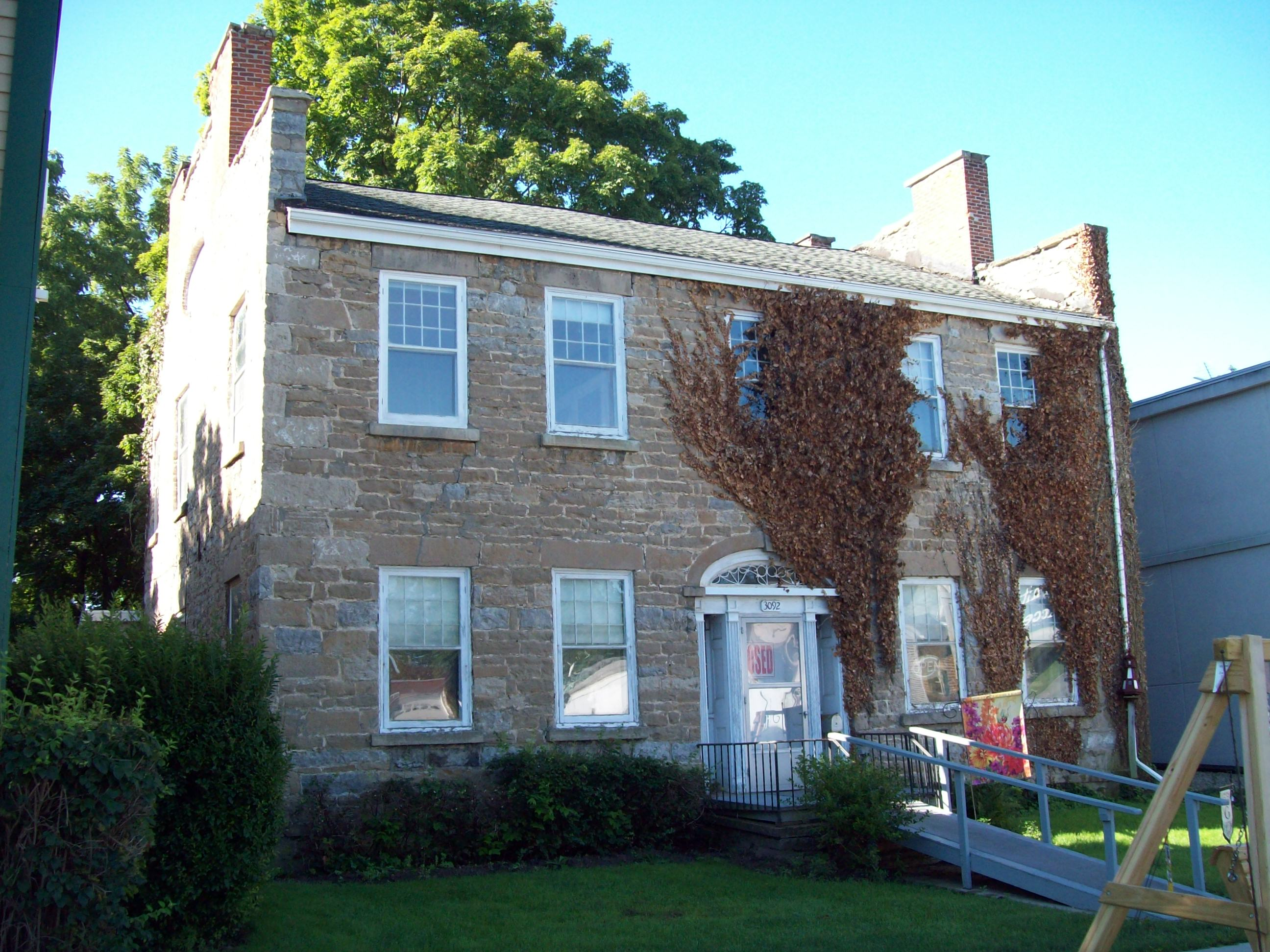
- Clark–Keith House, August 2010

- Location within New York Location within the United States
- Location: 3092 Main St., Caledonia, New York
- Coordinates: 42°58′23″N 77°51′18″W
- Area: 1 acre (0.40 ha)
- Built: 1827
- Architectural style: Federal
- NRHP reference No.: 98001114
- Added to NRHP: August 28, 1998

Clark–Keith House is a historic home located at Caledonia in Livingston County, New York. It is a 2 1/2-story, symmetrical, five-bay building constructed of cut stone in the Federal style. The structure was built about 1827 and has housed a tavern, post office, the village library, banks, and insurance agents. Since the 1920s, it has been used as a residence.

It was listed on the National Register of Historic Places in 2007.
