= Enrico Scotta =

Italian painter and sculptor (born 1949)

- Born: 15 September 1949 (age 76); Perugia
- Education: Accademia di Belle Arti di Perugia
- Known for: Painting, sculpture
- Awards: Artist of the Year, São Paulo, 1988 and 1989
- Website: enrico-scotta.de

Enrico Scotta (born 15 September 1949) is an Italian painter and sculptor. He has worked and exhibited in Italy, Germany, and Brazil.

== Early life and education ==
Enrico Scotta was born in 1949 in Perugia, Italy, where he studied at the Accademia di Belle Arti. He qualified in drawing, painting and ceramics, and later trained in the restoration of paintings.

Since 1998 he has been based in Radebeul, Germany (near Dresden), where his gallery is located.

== Artistic career ==
Scotta's paintings and sculptures are inspired by the archetypal myths and symbols of different cultures, and by female beauty and its association with creation and regeneration. These often-symbolic representations draw upon the physical and historical qualities of natural materials and man-made artefacts.

Scotta was initially inspired by the frescoes, paintings and historic monuments from the Etruscan, Roman, medieval and Renaissance past of Perugia. His early works draw mainly on European myths. Later, during his long stay in Latin America, his studies of pre-Columbian history and cultures in Mexico and Peru strongly influenced his works. One example of this is the extensive art project "O Povo do Sol e o Povo da Escuridão" (The people of the Sun; the People of the Darkness), which focuses on ancient Aztec civilisation, its myths, its gods, and its total destruction during the Spanish conquest.

The Brazilian Brooklin News noted on the exhibition of this project that "Enrico Scotta captured the attention of everyone, collectors and critics, for the perfection of his technique and his inventive spirit. For this exhibition he was honoured with the award 'Super Cap de Ouro' [as the Brazilian 'Artist of the year']."

Another cycle of paintings inspired by Aztec culture is Scotta's lunar cycle "Ilhuicatl Meztli" (The Celestial Path of the Moon), comprising eight round canvases. The Moon Goddess represents the waxing and waning phases of the moon, together with many of the associated Aztec symbols. This cycle of paintings uses the female goddess to symbolise the generative power of the Universe, which Scotta stated as, "La femminilità è l'espressione divina della creazione universale." ("Woman is the divine expression of universal creation.")

Scotta created his own mythical cosmos using recurring archetypal symbols and images that echoed across history, such as the "Great Earth Mother", priestesses, the Uroboros, the phoenix, the tree of life, the moon, fertility goddesses, water creatures and hermaphrodites.

His work also highlights his long fascination with the qualities of materials such as stone and the historical and cultural stories embodied in them. In a series of paintings, stone reliefs interact with the figures and objects in ways which play on their different qualities. This fascination is also evident in projects such as "Pedra e Ferro" ("Stone and Iron") in Brazil, for which he was honoured as the Brazilian 'Artist of the year' (Troféu Super Cap Ouro).

In Germany, "Sand – Stein – Kirche" ("Sand – Stone – Church") was a project about the Dresden Frauenkirche presented in Dresden, Weimar, Celle, Leipzig, Berlin and Osnabrück. It examines the evolution of an iconic architectural monument throughout its creation from sand to stone to sandstone, and the cycle of construction, destruction and reconstruction, using canvases to highlight the Frauenkirche as materially, historically and culturally connected to other heritage sites.

Scotta's work has often promoted cross-cultural dialogue. Ludwig Güttler, curator of the Frauenkirche foundation, said that "Scotta's travelling exhibition eloquently promotes the Frauenkirche's cultural value and announces its current reconstruction to the world."

Scotta and his work have been the focus of various bi-cultural Italian events organised by the Società Dante Alighieri in cities such as Weimar and Potsdam. He was also Beatrix of the Netherlands's guest of honour in Groningen during Italian Month in 1984.

== Charitable work ==
Scotta's cultural and social commitment is evident in a series of charitable art projects he has organised to raise money for victims of the 1980 Irpinia earthquake and for the reconstruction of the Frauenkirche. He has also taken part in various charity auctions and a collective exhibition for the Associazione Umbria per la Ricostruzione chirugica (AURC) in Perugia. A further charitable activity was his restoration of a series of paintings in the Karl May Museum Radebeul, Germany.

== Major works ==
- "O Povo do Sol e o Povo da Escuridão" (The people of the Sun; the People of the Darkness)
- "Ilhuicatl Meztli" (The Celestial Path of the Moon) – eight round canvases
- "Pedra e Ferro" ("Stone and Iron")
- "Erotische Steine" ("Erotic Stones") presented in Dresden and Potsdam,)
- "Sand – Stein – Kirche" ("Sand – Stone – Church")

=== Selected solo exhibitions ===
Scotta has an international profile of award-winning projects and solo exhibitions. Selected solo exhibitions are listed below, and a complete list can be found on his website.

- Italy
  - Festival dei Due Mondi – Rome (Ergife Palace Hotel), Verona (Galleria Nuova Scaligera)
- Germany
  - Dresden (Verkehrsmuseum; The Dresden Fair "Dresden2000, Projects and Visions"; Saxon Parliament; BSTU under the patronage of the Saxon Minister of Education and Arts)
  - Weimar (The Orangery, Belvedere Castle), Osnabrück (German Federal Environmental Foundation/Bundesumweltstiftung)
  - Celle (Congress Union)
  - Leipzig (Leipzig Fair "denkmal '96")
  - Berlin (Deutsches Architektur Zentrum)
- The Netherlands
  - Groningen (Martinikerk during the Italian Cultural Weeks)
- Brazil
  - Espaҫo D'Artefacto, São Paulo

== Awards ==
Scotta has won a series of international awards, including:

- Queen Beatrix Award, from Queen Beatrix of the Netherlands (Groningen), 1984
- Brazilian "Artist of the Year" (Troféu "Super Cap Ouro") São Paulo, 1988
- Brazilian "Artist of the Year" (Troféu "Super Cap Ouro") São Paulo, 1989
