= Caledonia Bridge =

Caledonia Bridge may refer to:

- Grand River Bridge (Ontario), Canada, also known as Caledonia Bridge
- Caledonia Bridge (Caledonia, North Dakota), U.S.
