= Caledonian Ocean =

Archaic name for the north Atlantic Ocean

The Caledonian Ocean is the archaic name for the north Atlantic Ocean.

The exact area it covers varies from source to source. However, it generally lies off the western coast of Scotland (the name of the ocean coming from the Roman name for the country Caledonia) and often also off the west coast of Ireland.

It borders the North Sea in the east and the Britannic Ocean in the south.
