= Scotland Township =

Scotland Township may refer to:

== United Kingdom ==
- Township (Scotland)

== United States ==
- Scotland Township, McDonough County, Illinois
- Scotland Township, Day County, South Dakota, in Day County, South Dakota
