= Seth Green (pisciculture) =

American fish farming pioneer (1817–1888)

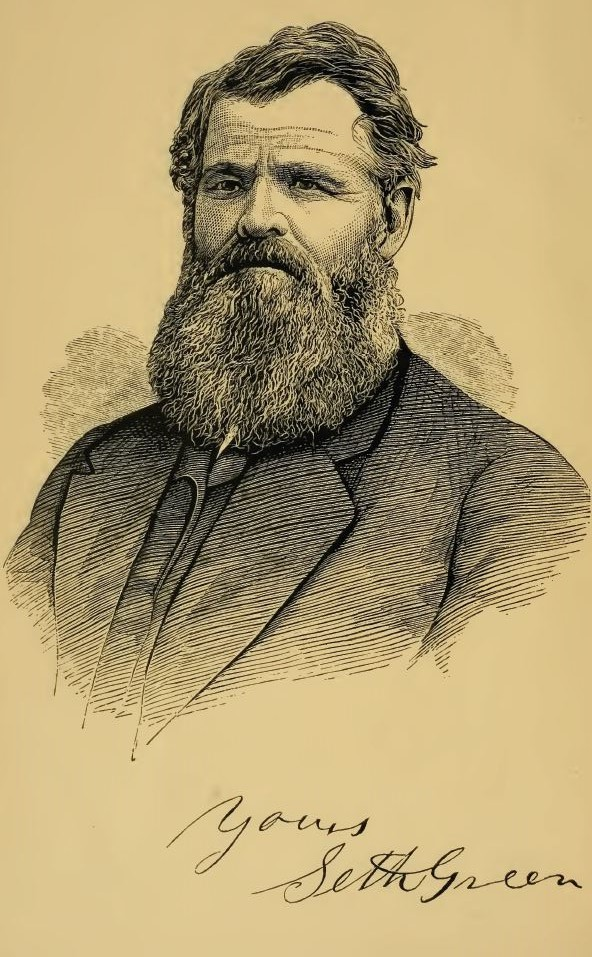
- Seth Green from his work Trout Culture (1870)
- Born: March 19, 1817; Rochester, New York, U.S.
- Died: August 18, 1888 (aged 71); Rochester, New York, U.S.
- Resting place: Mount Hope Cemetery, Rochester, New York
- Known for: Fish Farming pioneer

Seth Green (March 19, 1817 – August 18, 1888) was an American pioneer in fish farming (pisciculture and aquaculture). He established the first fish hatchery in the United States in the Town of Caledonia, New York. He was also a successful commercial fisherman, operating a large and profitable fish and game market in Rochester, New York, and fishing in Lake Ontario.

After many years of operating his commercial hatchery in Caledonia, he entered government service with the New York State Fish Commission and eventually became Superintendent of Fisheries for the state of New York. Seth Green's pioneering efforts to raise fish stocks and restore fish populations for sporting purposes established a standard of aquaculture recognized internationally. He also planted American Shad in California rivers near Sacramento. He is commonly referred to as the "Father of fish culture in North America."

== Early life ==
Seth Green was born in 1817 in Rochester, New York, the son of farmer Adonijah Green and his wife Betsy Bronson. He had one brother and two sisters. He grew up as an outdoor enthusiast in the small village of Carthage along the Genesee River near Rochester, learning fishing skills from his father and the local Seneca people. His formal schooling was limited to finishing fifth or sixth grade at a local Carthage district school.

When the financial Panic of 1837 severely affected the economy of Carthage, Green left home and decided to take up commercial fishing along the Genesee River. In 1848 he married Helen Cooke, a local Rochester girl. They established a fish and game market in downtown Rochester, which he operated with his brother and partner, Monroe Green. By 1857 the market employed more than 100 people. It was one of the largest and most prosperous fish markets in the region. To supply his market, Green traveled the shores of Lake Ontario over the years for fish. He and his fishermen survived many storms and hardships on Lake Ontario to supply the market with from 0.5 to 3 short tons (450 to 2,720 kg) daily. Early in his commercial fishing business, he observed Atlantic salmon spawning near Cobourg, Ontario, and conceived the idea of propagating his own stocks of fish, not only for market but to restock streams for sport fishing.

== Caledonia Fish Hatchery ==
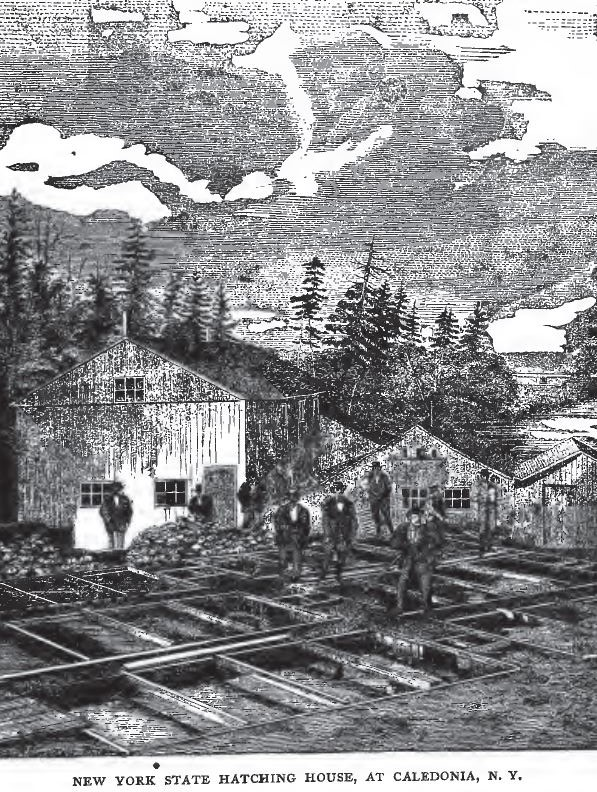
Caledonia Fish Hatchery circa 1879

Based on his own observations, ancient writings on fish culture, and his experimentation along the Genesee River, Green pioneered a new method of fertilization he called "dry impregnation". In 1864 he set up a small hatchery in Caledonia, New York, along a spring creek. Green's hatchery was the first in the Western Hemisphere. He kept his methods secret for many years while successfully and profitably raising Atlantic salmon and brook trout for market. Later, he expanded his techniques to other species, including shad, rainbow and brown trout. In 1867–1869 he experimented and pioneered methods to successfully propagate American shad in the Connecticut River near Holyoke, Massachusetts. Restocking the river with shad fry, resulted in an 1870 harvest that was 60% larger than the largest ever recorded in 1811.

== Government service ==
From an early age, Seth Green recognized that fish were not a limitless resource and over harvest would easily deplete rivers, lakes and streams of fish. In 1868, working with like-minded New York sportsmen, especially Robert B. Roosevelt and ex-governor Horatio Seymour, he encouraged the state legislature to form a fishing commission. Green, Roosevelt and Seymour were appointed as the state's first fish commissioners and charged with examining lakes and rivers and working to increase the production of fish in the waters of New York State. Their annual budget was $1,000.

Between 1868 and 1875, the commission established a regular stocking program in the state's rivers and lakes, being supplied by Seth Green's hatchery in Caledonia. During this period, Seth Green sold the hatchery to A.S. Collins, a friend and partner. In 1870, Green resigned his position as fish commissioner and the governor appointed him Superintendent of Fisheries. In 1875, the state bought the Caledonia hatchery. It has continued as a functioning fish hatchery in New York into the 21st century.

Although Green represented New York State, he promoted his propagation and stocking methods throughout the east coast. He is credited with reestablishing American Shad populations in coastal rivers as far south as the Savannah River in Georgia.

=== California ===
In early 1871, at the request of the California Fish Commission, Green transported more than 12,000 American Shad fry to Sacramento, California, to plant in the Sacramento River. In June 1871, after a train trip of seven days from Albany, New York, Green arrived with some 10,000 shad fry. They were stocked in the river near the town of Tehama, California. The project was a complete success, and in 1873 the state offered a $50 reward for the first shad to be caught from Pacific Ocean tributaries. They paid the reward on May 10, 1873. The fish was caught in a tributary of San Francisco Bay. The shad was a male fish 1 year, 9 months, and 12 days old. It was 17 inches (43 cm) long and weighed 3 pounds (1.4 kg). American shad were the first non-native fish introduced into California waters.

== Recognition and honors ==
By the early 1870s, Seth Green was internationally recognized as a leading expert on fish culture. He corresponded regularly with fisheries authorities around the world, especially in Germany, France and New Zealand. He wrote extensively about fish culture, publishing his first work Trout Culture in 1870 and his most comprehensive work, Home Fishing in Home Waters-A Practical Treatise in Fish Culture, in 1888. For many years he was the editor of the sports department of American Angler.

His work and contributions to fish culture were recognized in both the U.S. and abroad. In 1872 and 1875 the Imperiale d'Acclimatation of France awarded Green solid gold medals for his work in pisciculture. In 1876, the U.S. Centennial Commission gave Seth Green a certificate of award at the International Exhibition held at Philadelphia. In 1880, the German Fishing Society in Berlin awarded Green a gold medal for his work in fish culture.

== Death ==
In 1882 Green was on a fishing trip off the coast of the Carolinas with his friend Robert Barnwell Roosevelt. During the trip he contracted typhoid pneumonia. He never fully recovered from this disease. Although still able to function, he suffered a decline in his physical and mental health from that point on. In January 1888, Green and his son William were traveling to a museum when their carriage overturned. Green severely injured his back in the accident, an injury that confined him to his house for the remainder of his life. At the age of 71, senile and bed-ridden, Green died on August 18, 1888, in Rochester, New York.

== Legacy ==
Green and his Caledonia Fish Hatchery are credited with the introduction of rainbow trout into non-native waters east of the continental divide, brook trout into the west, and brown trout throughout the U.S. Rochester, New York named Seth Green Drive and the Seth Green Trail along the Genesee River, near the former location of Carthage, in his honor. The Rochester, New York chapter of Trout Unlimited is named after Green. The New York State Department of Environmental Conservation operates a 46 foot (14 m), 50 short tons (45 t) research vessel on Lake Ontario named Seth Green. In 1987, the Fish Culture Hall of Fame, an institution of the American Fisheries Society, enshrined Seth Green as the "Father of Fish Culture in North America."

The Caledonia Fish Hatchery was listed on the National Register of Historic Places in 2015.

== Bibliography ==
- Green, Seth (1870). Trout Culture (PDF). Rochester, New York: Seth Green and A.S. Collins.
- Roosevelt, Robert B.; Green, Seth (1879). Fish Hatching and Fish Catching (PDF). Rochester, New York: Union and Advertisers Book and Job Print.
- Green, Seth (1888). Home Fishing in Home Waters-A Practical Treatise on Fish Culture (PDF). New York: O. Judd Co.
