= Scottia =

Scottia may refer to:

- Scottia (crustacean), a genus in the family Cyprididae
- Scottia Thunb., a synonym of the legume genus Schotia
- Scottia R.Br. ex Ait., 1812, a synonym of the legume genus Bossiaea
- Scottia Grönblad, 1954, a synonym for Amscottia Grönblad, 1954, a Chlorophyta incertae sedis

== See also ==
- Scotia (disambiguation)
