= Calidonia =

Calidonia may refer to:

- Calidonia, Panamá, Panama
- Calidonia, Veraguas, Panama
