= Caledonia Waterfalls =

Waterfall in Platres, Cyprus

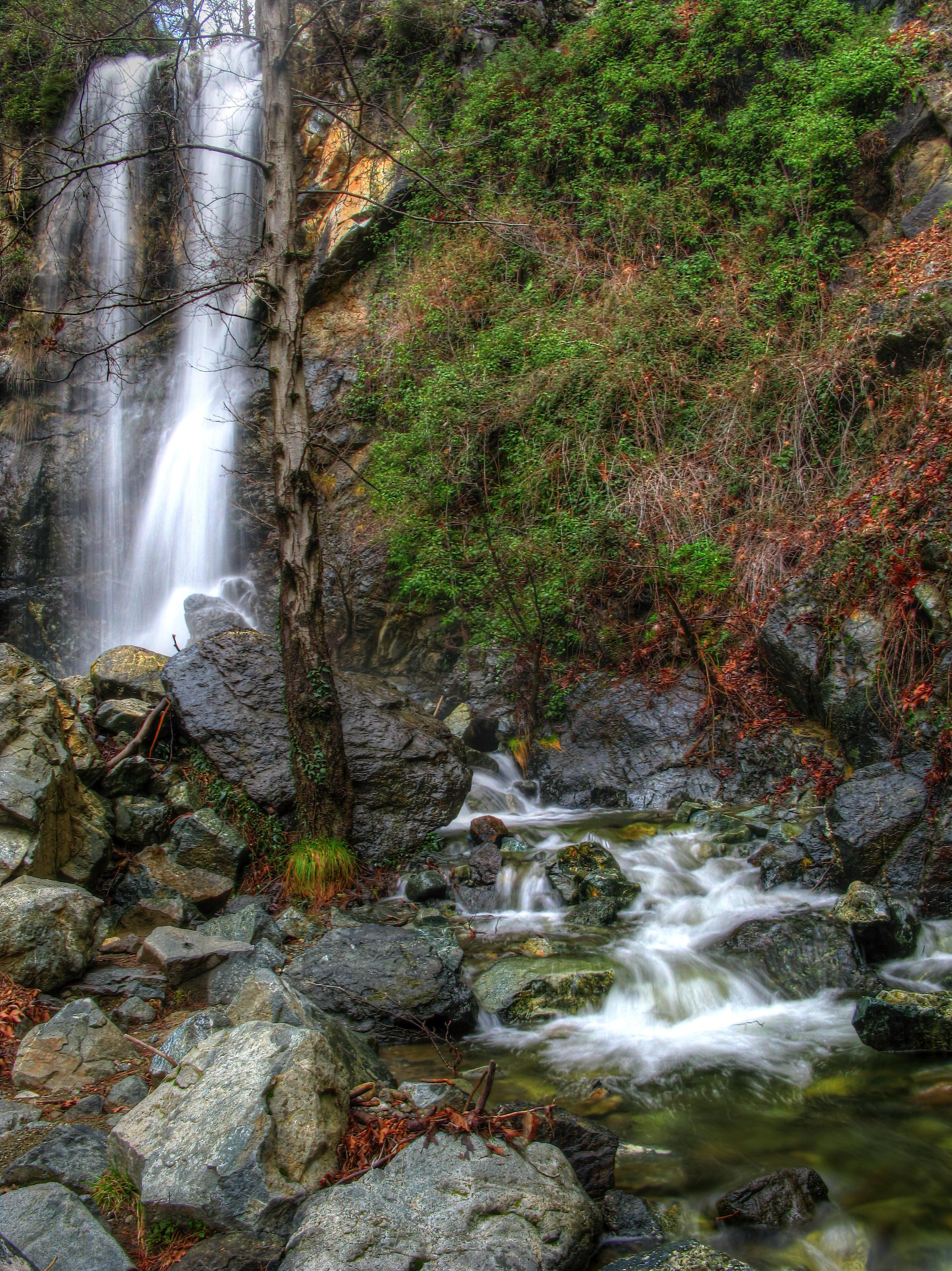
Caledonia Waterfalls

Caledonia Waterfalls or Kalidonia Waterfalls, (Greek: Καταρράκτης Καληδονιών Turkish: Kaledonya Şelalesi) is the Latin name given to the waterfalls discovered by a Scottish expedition visiting the Platres region of Cyprus in 1878. They were surprised by the resemblance of the waterfall with their homeland and named them Caledonia which is an ancient Latin name of Scotland.

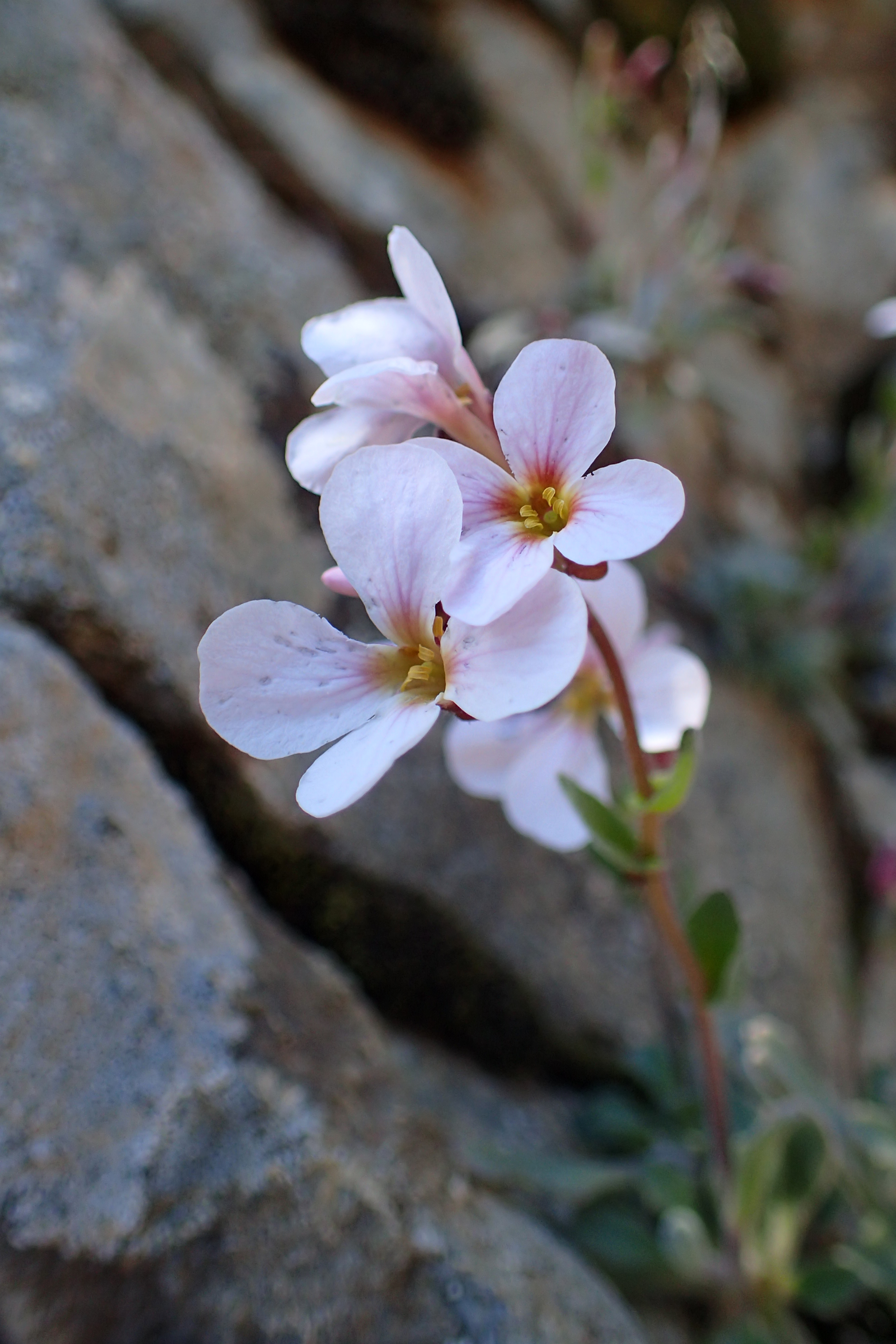
Arabis purpurea near Caledonia Waterfall, Cyprus

– endemic to the Troodos Mountains

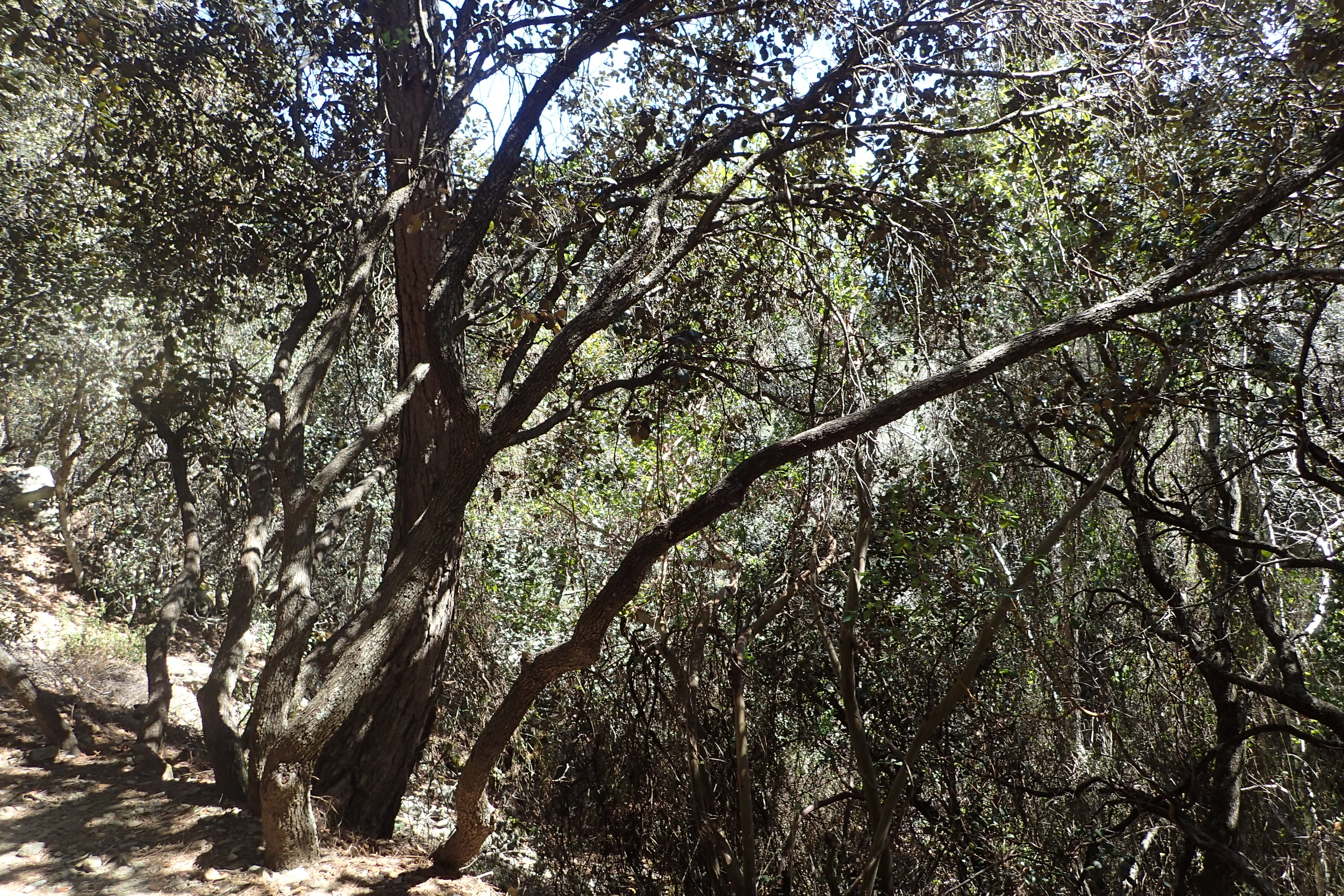
Quercus alnifolia near Caledonia Waterfall

== Description ==
The water of the waterfall falls vertically from a height of 12 meters. According to the season, the surrounding area is covered in lush forest and native wild flowers. Avoiding the nature trail, some choose to walk through a shortcut from Aeodion road through the Psilo Dendro Trout Farm. The trail can be followed from a parking area near the ‘Psilo Dendro’ (Tall Tree in Greek). Caledonia Falls can be enjoyed all year long, however, the rocky parts of the trail may be quite slippery after wet weather. Hiking boots are recommended for crossing the river in wet weather or after snowfall. Business Insider ranks the waterfall as the 14th Best waterfall in Europe.

== Location ==
The waterfalls are the highest in elevation found on the island and are located about 2 km north of Pano Platres village. The official starting point is 3km from Troodos square. Some tourists visit the area by using the roadway towards the waterfall or following the nature trail on foot leading to it through Psilo Dendro. The nature trail can take between 1.5 and 2.5 hours to walk. It is ranked as average (Level:3) in difficulty. The trail can be used for either hiking or walking but is best used from March until October. Dogs are able to use this trail as well.

== See also ==
- Troodos Mountains
- European long-distance paths
- British Cyprus
- Roman Cyprus

== Bibliography ==
- Haverfield, Francis (1911). "Caledonia" . In Chisholm, Hugh (ed.). Encyclopædia Britannica. Vol. 4 (11th ed.). Cambridge University Press. p. 987.
