= Caledonia Fish Hatchery =

- U.S. National Register of Historic Places
- U.S. Historic district
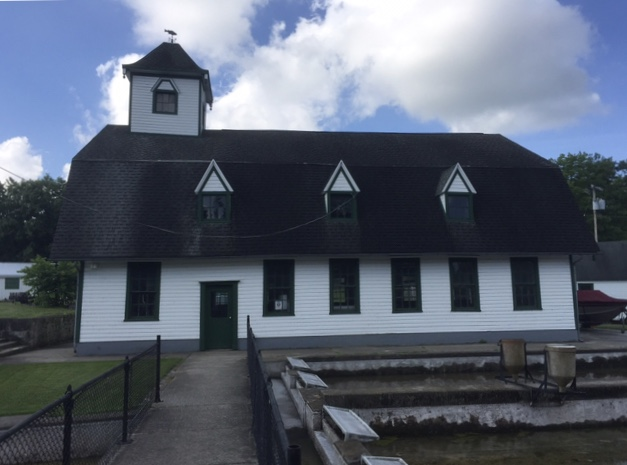

- Location within New York Location within the United States
- Location: 16 North St. Caledonia, New York
- Coordinates: 42°59′11″N 77°51′42″W
- Area: 18.53 acres (7.50 ha)
- Built: c. 1864, c. 1870, c. 1880
- Architect: William C. Green
- Architectural style: Queen Anne
- NRHP reference No.: 12000310
- Added to NRHP: February 27, 2015

Caledonia Fish Hatchery, also known as "Spring Brook" and the Seth Green State Hatchery, is a historic fish hatchery and national historic district located at Caledonia in Livingston County, New York. The district encompasses five contributing buildings, one contributing site, five contributing structures and two contributing buildings associated with the oldest fish hatchery in the Western Hemisphere. It is still in use by the state of New York and named for Seth Green (1817-1888), an American pioneer in fish farming and who established the hatchery in 1864. Located on the property are the contributing main hatchery building (c. 1880), Queen Anne style manager's residence (c. 1889-1890), ice house (c. 1890), "Lake House" (c. 1903), a memorial to Seth Green (1935), and fish ponds originally constructed in the 1930s and 1950s.

It was listed on the National Register of Historic Places in 2015.
