= New Albany, New Jersey =

Populated place in Burlington County, New Jersey, US

- Unincorporated community
- Location of New Albany in Burlington County (Inset: Location of county within the state of New Jersey) New Albany (New Jersey) New Albany (the United States)
- Coordinates: 40°00′05″N 74°58′17″W
- Country: United States
- State: New Jersey
- County: Burlington
- Township: Cinnaminson
- Elevation: 43 ft (13 m)
- Time zone: UTC−05:00 (Eastern (EST))
  - Summer (DST): UTC−04:00 (EDT)
- GNIS feature ID: 878717

New Albany is an unincorporated community located within Cinnaminson Township in Burlington County, in the U.S. state of New Jersey.
