= New Caledonia (disambiguation) =

New Caledonia is an overseas territory of France in the south Pacific.

New Caledonia may also refer to:

- New Caledonia (Canada), a former North American fur-trading district
- New Caledonia (typeface), a variation of the serif typeface Caledonia
- College of New Caledonia, with six campuses in British Columbia, Canada

== See also ==
- Darien scheme, an unsuccessful attempt by Scotland to establish a colony in Panama named New Caledonia
- Caledonia (disambiguation)
- New Scotland (disambiguation)
- Nova Scotia (disambiguation)
- New Albany (disambiguation)
