= USS Caledonia =

USS Caledonia may refer to the following ships of the United States Navy:

- USS Caledonia (1812), was captured off Fort Erie, Ontario, 8 October 1812, purchased by the Navy on 6 February 1813 and sold May 1815.
- Steamship Caledonia was acquired by the U.S. Navy and served as USS Mohawk in 1859–1864 and was later returned to commercial service as the SS Alliance.
- USS Caledonia (AK-167), was an Alamosa-class cargo ship, which served from 1945 until 1946.
