= New Scotland, Mpumalanga =

Coordinates: 26°30′30″S 30°30′00″E

New Scotland (Afrikaans: Nuwe Skotland) is a farming region in the former Republic of Transvaal bordering Eswatini, which was settled about 1866 and promoted by Alexander McCorkindale for emigrants from Scotland and the Natal Colony. After the death of McCorkindale in 1872 who was the fledgling community's inspirer, the grand plans of an industrial and commercial centre faltered and many of the Scots moved elsewhere to the Diamond rush in Kimberley and the gold rush of the Witwaterand. The area is commonly misty reminding the early visitors of Scotland.

The Transvaal government of the time welcomed the establishment of farms in the area to act as a buffer against the troublesome Swazis.

The area comprised about 200 farms with the farms and village names inspired by place names from Scottish such as Bothwell, Iona, Knockdhu, Lothair, Hamilton, Caledonia, Mount Denny, Blairmore, Busby, Craigie Lea, Arthur’s Seat, Jessievale, The Brook, Bonnie Braes, Hamilton, Lochiel, Lochleven, Waverley, Lochleven, Dundonald, Bonny Brae, Broadholm, Lona, Dumbarton, Bonnie Brook and Craigerley. Certain farms were named after early farmers to the New Scotland Community such as David Dale, Isabelladale, Clarence, Jessievale.

== Map ==
The map shows farms known to be part of the New Scotland project from historical references as well as those of Scottish origin. The area forms a rough triangle with Amsterdam, Mpumalanga in the south corner and Chrissiemeer at the Western corner. The Oshoek border post makes up the approximate Eastern corner.
