= Caledonia =

Geographical name used by Roman Empire for northern Scotland

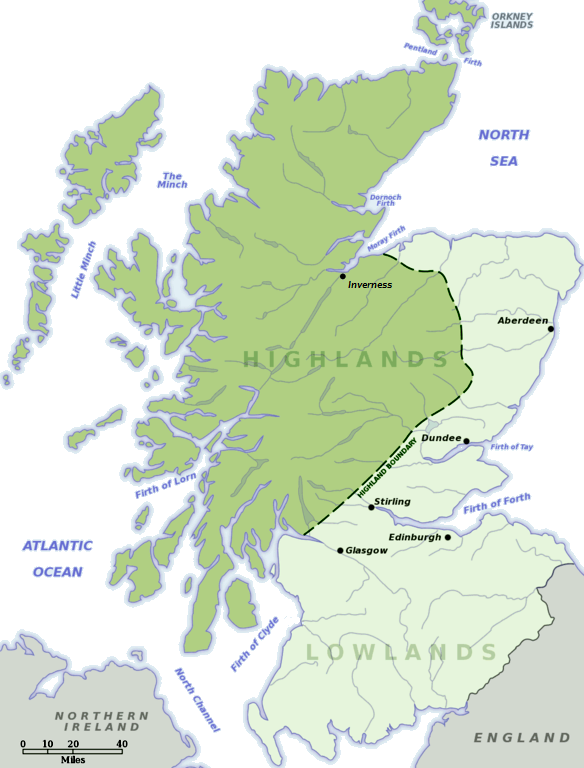
Scottish Highlands and Lowlands

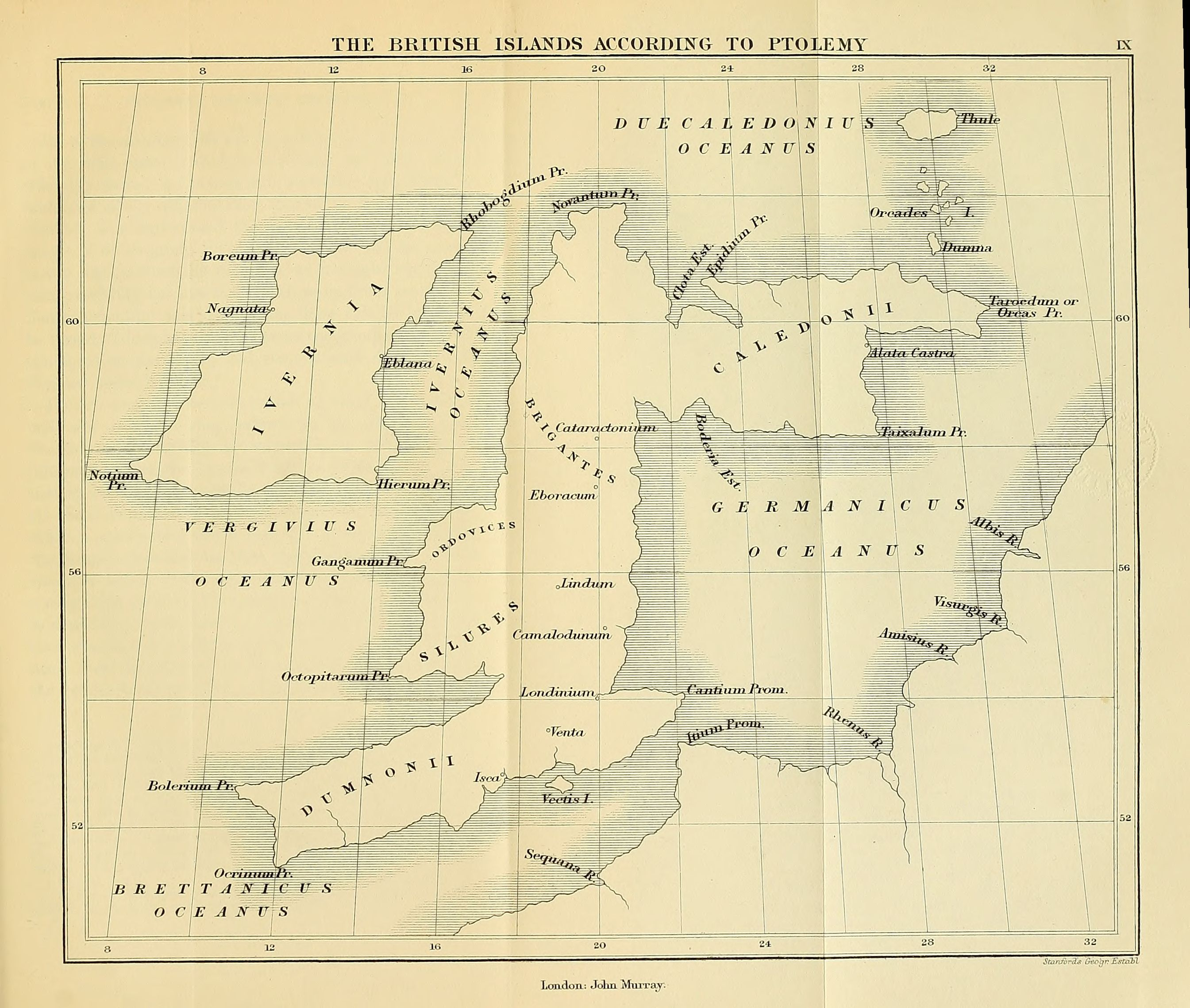
Map of the British Isles drawn from Ptolemy's cartographic works, showing his rotation of Caledonia to the east and delimited from the rest of Great Britain by the estuaries of the Boderia (Firth of Forth) and the Clota (Firth of Clyde). From Edward Bunbury's A History of Ancient Geography Among the Greeks and Romans (1879)

Caledonia (/ˌkælɪˈdoʊniə/; Latin: Calēdonia [kaleːˈdonia]) was the Latin name used by the Roman Empire to refer to the forested region in the central and western Scottish Highlands, particularly stretching through parts of what are now Lochaber, Badenoch, Strathspey, and possibly as far south as Rannoch Moor, known as Coed Celedon (Coed Celyddon using the modern alphabet) to the native Brython (Britons). Today, it is used as a romantic or poetic name for all of Scotland. During the Roman Empire's occupation of Britain, the area they called Caledonia was physically separated from the rest of the island by the Antonine Wall. It remained outside the administration of Roman Britain.

Roman historians, including Tacitus and Cassius Dio, referred to the territory north of the River Forth as "Caledonia", and described it as inhabited by the Maeatae and the Caledonians (Latin: Caledonii).

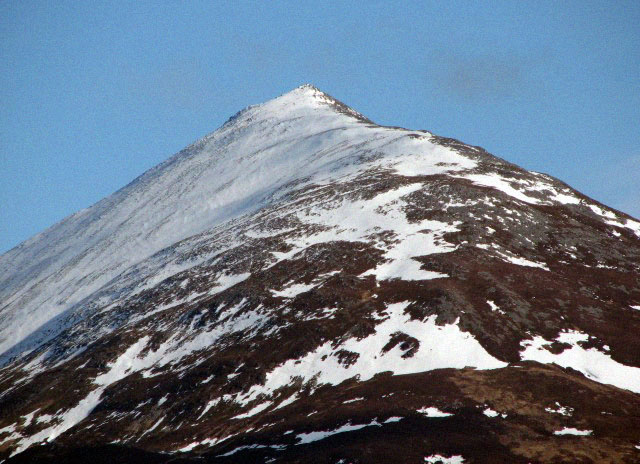
The north-west ridge of Schiehallion, the "fairy hill of the Caledonians".

== History ==
=== Etymology ===
In 1824, Scottish antiquarian George Chalmers posited that Caledonia derived from Cal-ydon, the name of a Greek province famous for its forests. He hypothesized that classical writers such as Tacitus later applied this name to the Scottish Highlands as another area of woods. This derivation is no longer accepted by modern linguists.

According to linguist Stefan Zimmer, Caledonia is derived from the tribal name Caledones (a Latinization of a Brittonic nominative plural n-stem Calēdones or Calīdones, from earlier *Kalē=Black River=don/Danue Goddess[i]oi). He etymologises this name as perhaps 'possessing hard feet' ("alluding to standfastness or endurance"), from the Proto-Celtic roots *kal- 'hard' and *pēd- 'foot', with *pēd- contracting to -ed-. The singular form of the ethnic name is attested as Caledo (a Latinization of the Brittonic nominative singular n-stem *Calidū) on a Romano-British inscription from Colchester. However, some authors have doubted the link between Calidones and kalet- 'hard', especially in light of the widely rejected theory that the Caledonians and Picts might not have been Celtic speakers.

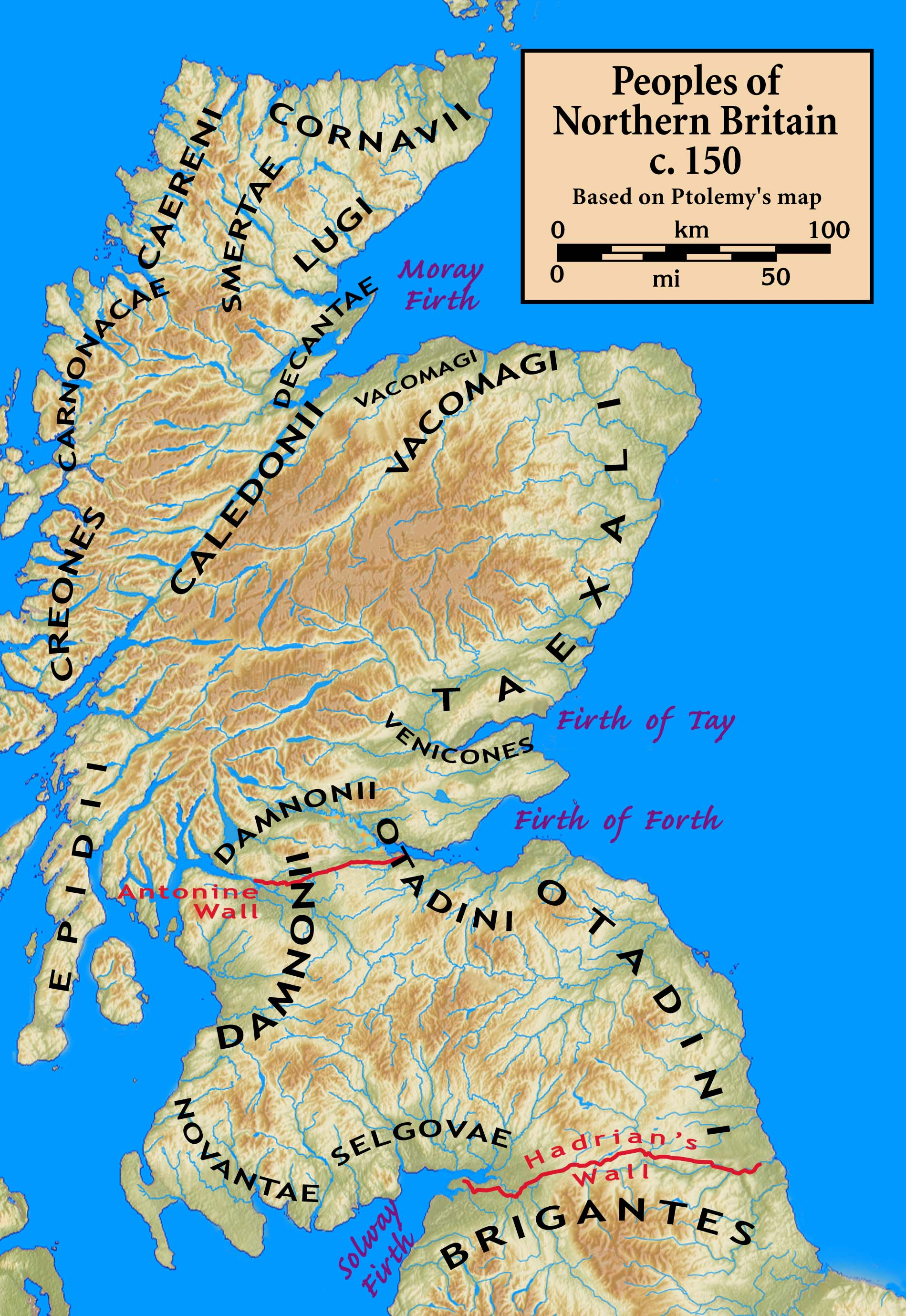
Map of the populations in northern Britain, based on the testimony of Ptolemy.

=== Toponymy ===
The name of the Caledonians may be found in toponymy, such as Dùn Chailleann, the Scottish Gaelic name of the town of Dunkeld, meaning 'fort of the Caledonii', and possibly in that of the mountain Sìdh Chailleann, the 'fairy hill of the Caledonians'. According to Historia Brittonum, the site of the seventh battle of the legendary King Arthur was a forest in what is now Scotland, called Coit Celidon in early Welsh. The name seems to relate to that of a large central Brythonic tribe, the Caledonii, one amongst several in the area and perhaps the dominant tribe, which would explain the binomial Caledonia/Caledonii.

== Modern usage ==
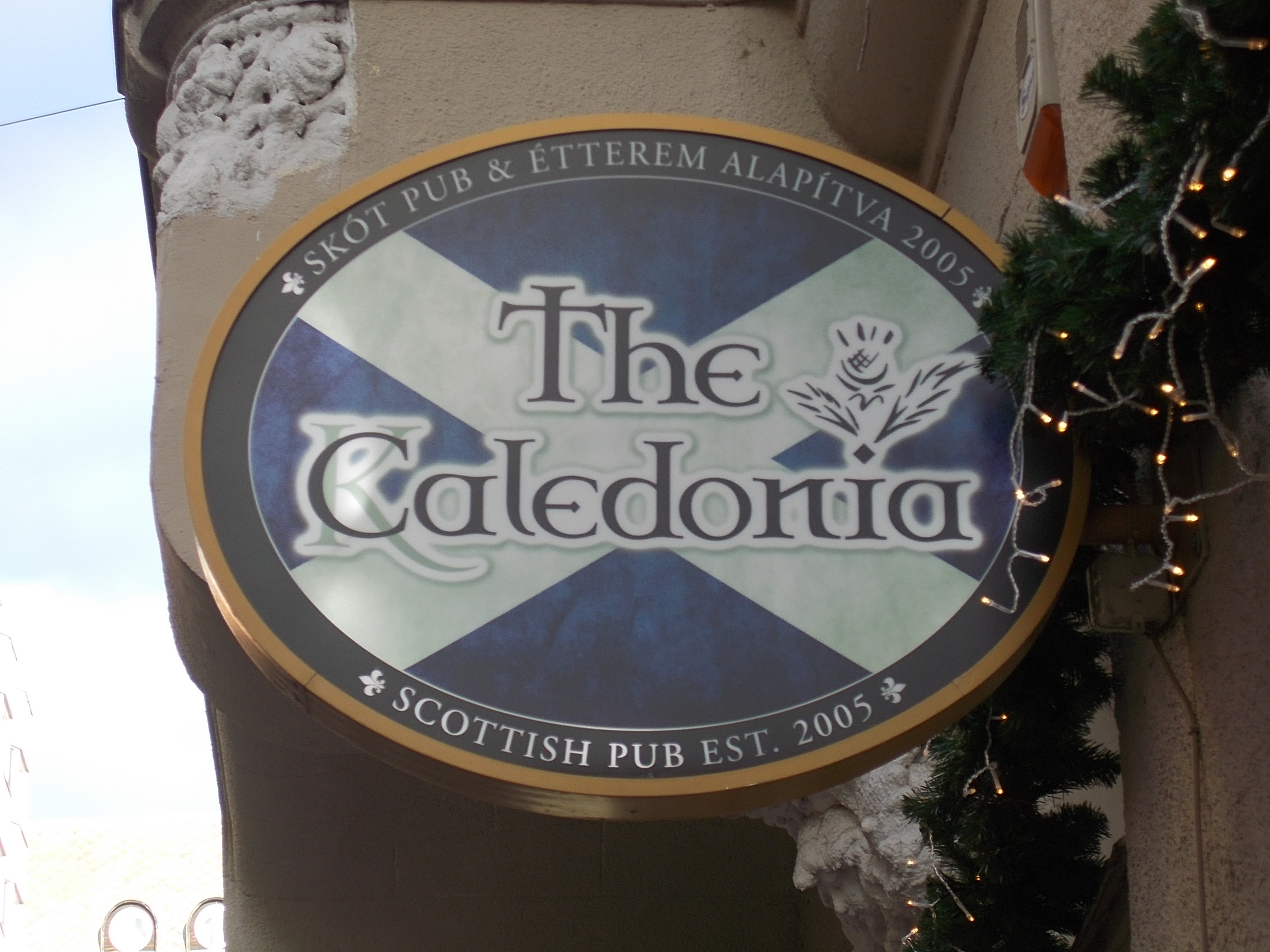
Scottish pub in Budapest named "The Caledonia"

The modern use of "Caledonia" in English and Scots is either as a historical description of northern Britain during the Roman era or as a romantic or poetic name for Scotland as a whole.

The name has been widely used by organisations and commercial entities. Notable examples include Glasgow Caledonian University, ferry operator Caledonian MacBrayne, and the now-defunct British Caledonian airline and Caledonian Railway. The Caledonian Sleeper is an overnight train service from London to Scottish destinations.

The Inverness Caledonian Thistle F.C. is a professional football club. In music, "Caledonia" is a popular Scottish patriotic song and folk ballad written by Dougie MacLean in 1977 and published in 1979 on an album of the same name; it has since been covered by various other artists, most notably Frankie Miller and Van Morrison. An original rock piece titled Caledonia appeared on Robin Trower's fourth album, "Long Misty Days", where coincidentally Frankie Miller cowrote another track on that album. The web series Caledonia and associated novel is a supernatural police drama that takes place in Glasgow, Scotland.

Ptolemy's account in his Geography also referred to the Caledonia Silva, an idea still recalled in the modern expression "Caledonian Forest", although the woods are much reduced in size since Roman times. (Note: The extent of the reduction is a matter of debate. This association with a Silva (literally the flora) reinforces the idea that Caledonia was a forest or forested area named after the Caledonii, or that the people were named after the woods in which they dwelt.)

The name "Scotland" is ultimately derived from Scotia, a Latin term first used for Ireland (also called Hibernia by the Romans) and later for Scotland, the Scoti peoples having originated in Ireland and resettled in Scotland. (Note: Bede used a Latin form of the word Scots as the name of the Gaels of Dál Riata. (Bede 1999, p. 386)) Another, post-conquest, Roman name for the island of Great Britain was Albion, which is cognate with the Scottish Gaelic name for Scotland: Alba.

There is an emerging trend to use the term Caledonia to describe New Caledonia in English, which reflects the usage in French of Calédonie (where the full name is La Nouvelle-Calédonie). The New Caledonian trade and investment department promotes inward investment with the slogan "Choose Caledonia".

== See also ==
- Battle of Mons Graupius
- Caledonian Ocean
- Caledonia Waterfalls
