= Nova Scotia (disambiguation) =

Nova Scotia is a province of Canada.

Nova Scotia may also refer to:

- Nova Scotia (ship), a list of ships with the name
- Nova Scotia (album), a 2005 album by Cousteau
- Nova Scotia: New Scottish Speculative Fiction, a 2005 science fiction and fantasy anthology
- Nova Scotia, Bristol, an historic nineteenth-century public house in Bristol, England
- 45556 Nova Scotia, a British LMS Jubilee Class locomotive

== See also ==
- New Caledonia (disambiguation)
- New Scotland (disambiguation)
- New Albany (disambiguation)
- Scotia (disambiguation)
- Outline of Nova Scotia
