= Caledonia, Guysborough County, Nova Scotia =

Community in Nova Scotia, Canada

Coordinates: 45°16′28″N 62°23′14″W

Caledonia in Nova Scotia

Caledonia is a small community in the Canadian province of Nova Scotia, located in the Municipality of the District of Saint Mary's in Guysborough County.
