= Caledonia Mills =

Community in Nova Scotia, Canada

Coordinates: 45°29′58″N 61°49′1″W

Caledonia Mills in Nova Scotia

Caledonia Mills (Scottish Gaelic: An Daigear) is a community in the Canadian province of Nova Scotia, located in Antigonish County.

== Alleged haunting ==
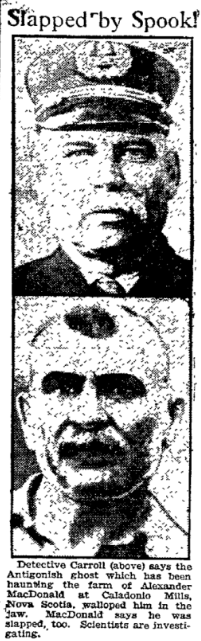
Wisconsin Rapids Daily Tribune. 13 March 1922

It is well known as the community of the Mary-Ellen spook farm, also known as the fire spook. It was alleged that the community experienced mysterious fires and poltergeist effects between 1899 and 1922. The case drew the attention of Arthur Conan Doyle, the author of Sherlock Holmes. Mary-Ellen's biological parents were John and Annie (Duggan) MacDonald and she was later adopted by Alexander and Janet MacDonald of Caledonia Mills.

Walter Franklin Prince, research officer for the American Society for Psychical Research in 1922 investigated and concluded that the mysterious fires and alleged poltergeist phenomena were caused by Mary-Ellen in a dissociated state. Prince had discovered inflammable liquid and noted that "the fires were undoubtedly set by human hands, judging by the unmistakable signs left in the house. The burns are never found on the wall paper higher than the reach of a person five feet tall, which is the height of [the] girl in the family."

== See also ==
- Great Amherst Mystery
