= Caledonia House Hotel =

- U.S. National Register of Historic Places
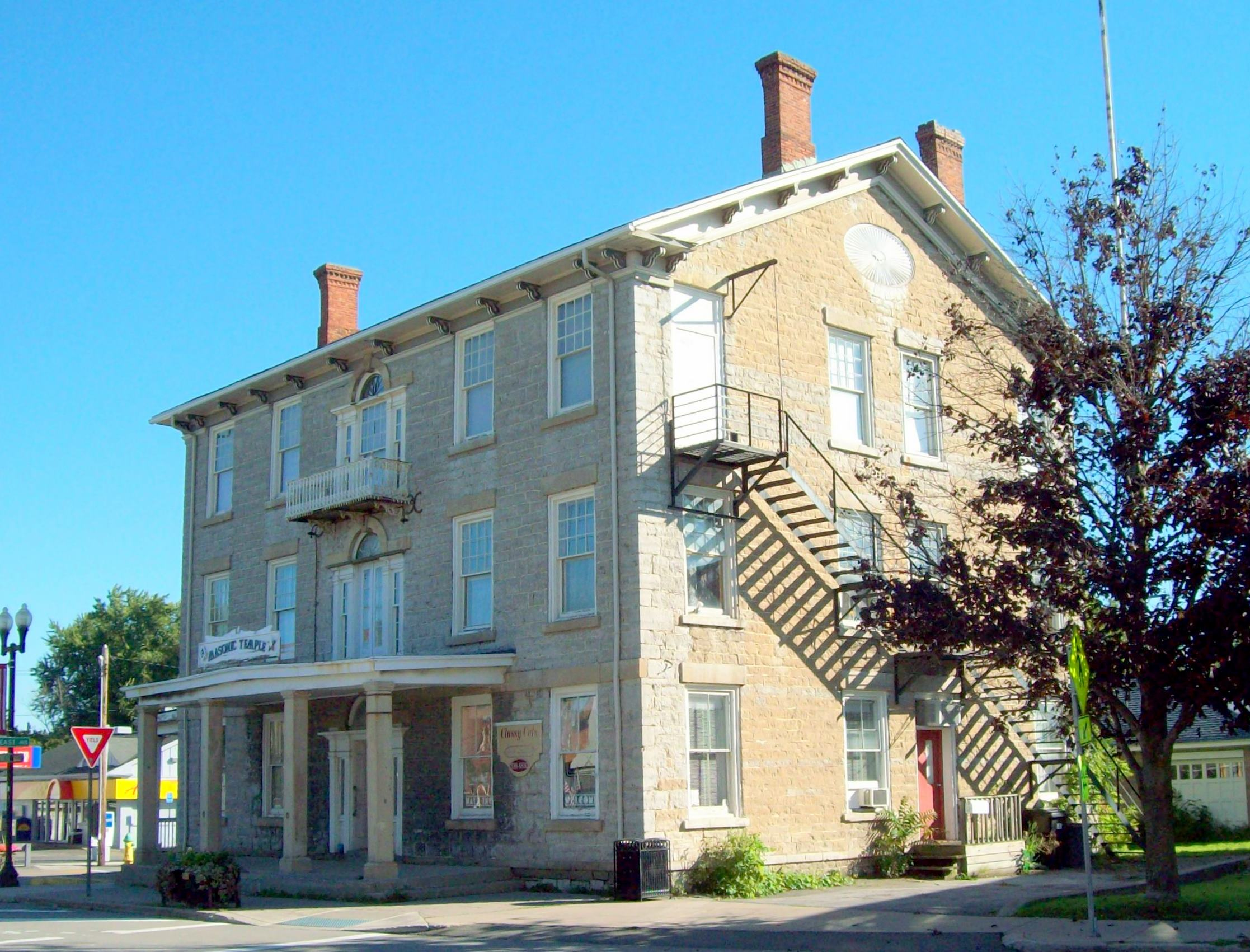
- Caledonia House Hotel, August 2010

- Location within New York Location within the United States
- Location: 3141 State St., Caledonia, New York
- Coordinates: 42°58′23″N 77°51′11″W
- Area: 0.2 acres (0.081 ha)
- Built: 1831
- Architect: Butterick, John
- Architectural style: Federal
- NRHP reference No.: 01000997
- Added to NRHP: September 13, 2001

Caledonia House Hotel, also known as the Masonic Temple, is a historic hotel located at Caledonia in Livingston County, New York. It has a 3 1/2-story, symmetrical, five-by-three-bay main section with a 1 1/2-story wing. It was constructed in 1831–1833 of cut stone in the Federal style. The elegant center entrance, Palladian facade windows, and affiliated decorative woodwork are especially noteworthy. Built originally as a hotel and used as such through the 19th century, the structure now houses three commercial spaces on the first floor and the local masonic temple on the second and third floors and rear wing.

It was listed on the National Register of Historic Places on September 13, 2001.
