= New Scotland =

New Scotland may refer to:

- Nova Scotia, Canadian province, Latin for New Scotland
- New Scotland, Chatham-Kent, Ontario, Canada
- New Scotland, Regional Municipality of York, Ontario, Canada
- New Scotland, New Brunswick, a community in Moncton Parish, New Brunswick, Canada
- New Scotland, New York, United States
- New Scotland, Mpumalanga, in former Eastern Transvaal, South Africa

== See also ==
- Scotland (disambiguation)
- Nova Scotia (disambiguation)
- Scottish place names in other countries
- New Scotland Yard
- New Caledonia
