= New Wales =

New Wales may refer to:

- A historic region of northwestern Canada; see New Britain (Canada)
- Pennsylvania, United States (early proposed name thereof)
  - Welsh Tract, its Welsh-speaking area

== See also ==
- New South Wales, Australia
