= Caledonia (ship) =

Several ships have borne the name Caledonia for Caledonia:

== Caledonia (1794 ship) ==
- Caledonia (1794 ship) was launched at Greenock in 1794. The French captured her in 1795.

== Caledonia (1795 ship) ==
- Caledonia (1795 ship) was launched in India and made three voyages to England for the British East India Company (EIC). She was trading in India in 1803 when a fire destroyed her, with great loss of life.

== Caledonia (1797 ship) ==
- Caledonia (1797 ship) was launched in 1780 in Spain, almost certainly under another name. She apparently was taken in prize circa 1797. Caledonia made one voyage to the Caribbean and then under a subsequent owner made five voyages as a whaler in the Southern Whale Fishery. She may then have become a transport, but though listed in the registries until 1813, does not clearly appear in ship arrival and departure data after 1805.

== Caledonia (1800 ship) ==
- Caledonia (1800 ship) was launched in Philadelphia in 1779, possibly under another name. Caledonia first appeared in British records in 1800. She traded with the Baltic and Canada. Then in 1814 United States privateers captured her twice. The first time the privateer released Caledonia; the second time the Royal Navy recaptured her. She returned to trading with Canada until she was wrecked in September 1824.

== Caledonia (1805 ship) ==
- Caledonia (1805 ship) was a Spanish ship taken in prize that made two slave trading voyages to Africa between 1805 and 1808.

== Caledonia (1807 ship) ==
- Caledonia (1807 ship) was launched in Chester. She sailed as a letter of marque, trading between England and Demerara. She captured or recaptured two vessels, and repelled an attack by a US privateer in a single ship action. In 1833 she made a voyage to India, sailing under one of the last licences that the British East India Company (EIC) issued before it gave up its shipping activities. Caledonia then continued to trade with India, Africa, and Peru. She suffered a maritime incident in 1840. She was last listed in 1847 after having returned to Lima in April 1846 in a highly leaky state.

== Caledonia (1811 ship) ==
- Caledonia, of 368, or 369 tons (bm), was built in America in 1809 under another name. She was taken in prize for trading with the French. She was sold to British owners in 1811 who renamed her and sailed her as a West Indiaman. Caledonia first appeared in Lloyd's Register (LR) in 1811. In 1813 the British East India Company (EIC) had lost its monopoly on the trade between India and Britain. British ships were then free to sail to India or the Indian Ocean under a licence from the EIC. Captain R.Watson sailed Caledonia for Bengal on 30 April 1818. Captain Robinson sailed Caledonia for Fort William, India on 28 February 1819. Caledonia, Roberts, master, returned on 22 January 1820 to Portsmouth, having come from Bengal via the Cape of Good Hope. On 28 January she was at Margate, having lost an anchor; two days later she was at Gravesend. On 22 May Caledonia, Robertson, master, was at Malta, having sailed from Liverpool. There is no further mention of her in Lloyd's List's ship arrival and departure data. She was last listed in the Register of Shipping in 1822 and in Lloyd's Register (LR) in 1826, with data unchanged since 1821.

== Caledonia (1815 ship) ==
- Caledonia (1815 ship) was launched at Sunderland. She initially traded with India but then in 1820 and 1822 she transported convicts to Van Diemen's Land. She became a West Indiaman until her crew had to abandon her at sea in August 1832 when she became waterlogged.

== PS Caledonia (1815) ==
- PS Caledonia (1815) was launched at Port Glasgow. She was sold to Danish owners in 1819, and scrapped in the early 1840s.

== Caledonia (1829 ship) ==
- Caledonia (1829 ship) was a merchant ship built in 1829 in India that made two voyages transporting convicts from Madras and the Swan River Colony to Sydney, Australia.

== Caledonia (1839 ship) ==
- Caledonia (1839 ship), a brig launched at Arboath and wrecked in 1843 at Cornwall

== Caledonia (1841 ship) ==
- Caledonia, of 383 tons (bm), was launched at Greenock in 1841. She first appeared in Lloyd's Register in 1841 with B. Allan, master, Allan & Co., owners, and trade Clyde–Quebec. She was driven ashore at Rackwick, Hoy, Orkney Islands. Her 21 crew were rescued. She was on a voyage from Quebec City, Province of Canada, British North America to Greenock.

== SS Caledonia (1890) ==
- In 1890 Charles Connell and Company in Glasgow launched a cargo steamship called Banda. in 1904 Hamburg America Line (HAPAG) bought her and renamed her Caledonia. In 1912 HAPAG sold her to new owners, who renamed her Wm. Eisenach.

== SS Caledonia (1904) ==
- SS Caledonia (1904) was a 9,223-ton British passenger ship built for the Anchor Line by David and William Henderson & Company at Glasgow, Scotland, and was launched on 22 October 1904. A German submarine sank her on 4 December 1916.

== RMS Caledonia ==
- RMS Caledonia was a 17,046-ton British passenger ship built for the Anchor Line by Alexander Stephen and Sons at Glasgow, Scotland, and was launched on 21 April 1925. In 1939 she was converted to an armed merchant cruiser and renamed to HMS Scotstoun. A German submarine sank her on 13 June 1940.

== PS Caledonia (1934) ==
- PS Caledonia (1934), a paddle steamer built in 1934. She spent her final days as a floating pub in London until a fire in 1980 destroyed her

== MV Caledonia ==
- MV Caledonia, Caledonian MacBrayne ferry

== See also ==
- HMS Caledonia, various ships and bases of the Royal Navy
- USS Caledonia (1812), a warship during the War of 1812
- USS Caledonia (AK-167), an Alamosa-class cargo ship that served from 1945 until 1946
- Caledonian (ship)
