= Caledonian (ship) =

Several vessels have been named Caledonian for the people of Caledonia:

== Caledonian (1797 ship) ==
- Caledonian (1797 ship) was launched on the Thames River in 1797 and made two voyages to China and India for the British East India Company (EIC) between 1798 and 1803 before she burnt in 1804.

== Caledonian (1811 ship) ==
- Caledonian (1811 ship) was launched at Barnstaple; her crew had to abandon her at sea in 1813.

== Caledonian (1815 ship) ==
- Caledonian was launched in 1815 at St Johns, New Brunswick. She immediately sailed to Great Britain and took up registry there. Caledonian first appeared in Lloyd's Register (LR) in 1815. In 1813 the EIC lost its monopoly on the trade between India and Britain. British ships were then free to sail to India or the Indian Ocean under a licence from the British East India Company (EIC). On 27 July 1817, Caledonian, Gillies, master, sailed for Bombay. In all, she made two voyages to India. She spent most of her career sailing between Great Britain and Canada, or the southern United States. On 1 July 1841 Caledonian was driven ashore and wrecked at Lawler's Cove, Newfoundland. She was on a voyage from the Kingston upon Hull to Quebec City. Her hull and materials were saved. LR for 1841 carried the annotation "Wrecked".

== Caledonian Star ==
- Caledonian Star (built in 1966), former name of the National Geographic Endeavour expedition ship

== See also ==
- Caledonian MacBrayne, ferry operator in Scotland
- Caledonia (ship)
