= Vulture (disambiguation) =

A vulture is a large scavenging bird of prey.

Vulture, Vultures, etc., may also refer to:

== Arts, entertainment, and media ==
=== Fictional entities ===
- Vulture (DC Comics), a fictional criminal organization, as well as five unrelated characters
- Vulture (Marvel Comics), several supervillain characters
  - Vulture (Marvel Cinematic Universe), a film character

=== Films ===
- The Vulture (1937 film), a British comedy
- The Vulture (1967 film), a British horror film
- The Vulture (1981 film), an Israeli movie by Yaky Yosha
- The Vulture (1982 film), a Hungarian crime film
- The Vultures (1975 film), a Quebec film
- The Vultures (1984 film), a French adventure film

=== Literature ===
- "Vultures" (poem), by Chinua Achebe
- "The Vulture" (short story), a short story by Franz Kafka
- The Vulture, a 1970 book by Gil Scott-Heron

=== Music ===
==== Groups ====
- The Vultures (band), a London-based alternative group formed in 2013
- The Vultures, a 1970s R&B group in Newport, Wales, featuring Joe Strummer

==== Albums ====
- Vultures (AxeWound album), 2012
- Vultures (Smile Empty Soul album), 2006
- Vultures 1, a 2024 album by ¥$
- Vultures 2, a 2024 album by ¥$
- Vultures (EP), released in 2015 by Disciple
- Vultures, a 2012 album by Kensington
- Vultures, a 2013 album by Dozer
- The Vulture, a 2014 album by King Raam
- Vulture, a 2020 album by Rob49

==== Songs ====
- "Vulture", by James from Strip-mine, 1988
- "Vultures", by Israel Vibration from Praises, 1990
- "Vulture", by Patrick Wolf from The Bachelor, 2009
- "Vultures" (song), by ¥$, 2023
- "Vultures", by Arch Enemy from Rise of the Tyrant, 2007
- "Vultures", by Asking Alexandria from Asking Alexandria, 2017
- "Vultures" (Feeder song), from Black/Red, 2024
- "WUTD" + "Vultures", a double A-side single by Genesis Owusu, 2019
- "Vultures", by Insane Clown Posse from Bang! Pow! Boom!, 2009
- "Vultures", by John Mayer from Continuum, 2006
- "Vultures", by Northlane from Alien, 2019
- "Vultures", by The Offspring from Conspiracy of One, 2000
- "Vultures", by Soilwork from Övergivenheten, 2022
- "Vultures", by Underoath from The Place After This One, 2025
- "Vultures", by Upon a Burning Body from Blood of the Bull, 2025
- "The Vulture (Acts I & II)", by Gallows from Grey Britain, 2009
- "The Vulture", by Pendulum from Immersion, 2009
- "The Vulture", a 2002 song by Clinic from Walking with Thee

=== Other uses in arts, entertainment, and media ===
- Vulture (talk show), a 2005 Australian arts talk show
- Vulture (website), a website focusing on pop culture run by New York magazine
- Vulture, a version of the computer game Falcon's Eye
- "The Vulture" (Brooklyn Nine-Nine), a television episode

== Military ==
- HMS Vulture, various British Royal Navy ships and one Naval Air Station
- Vickers Vulture, a version of the Vickers Viking amphibious aircraft
- ATE Vulture, a South African Army unmanned aerial vehicle (UAV)
- Boeing SolarEagle (Vulture II), a proposed spy UAV
- Rolls-Royce Vulture, an aero engine developed before the Second World War
- Operation Vulture, a proposed 1954 American operation to rescue French forces besieged in Dien Bien Phu, Indochina

== Places ==
=== In the United States ===
- Vulture Mountains, Arizona
  - Vulture Mine, Arizona, a mine and a community
- Vulture Peak (Montana), Glacier National Park, Montana
  - Vulture Glacier (Montana), on the southern flanks of the mountain

=== Elsewhere ===
- Vulture Glacier (Alberta), Banff National Park, Canada
- Vulture Peak, Rajgir, Bihar, India, associated with the Buddha
- Vulture (region), Italy
  - Monte Vulture, an extinct volcano and the namesake of the region

== Sports ==
- Phil Regan (baseball) (born 1937), American Major League Baseball pitcher nicknamed "The Vulture"
- Vulture, a baseball term for a type of relief pitcher
- Atlanta Vultures, a short-lived American Indoor Football team

== Other uses ==
- Vulture (ship), various ships
- Vulture Street, Brisbane, Queensland, Australia
- Vulture (hieroglyph), an ancient Egyptian letter/sign
- Vulture 1, the record-setting Paper Aircraft Released Into Space

== See also ==
- Vultur, a genus of New World Vultures (family Cathartidae)
- Vulture capitalist, an investor that acquires distressed firms in the hopes of making them more profitable and selling at a profit
- Vulture fund, which invests in debt considered to be very weak or in default
- Vulture restaurant, a site where carrion is deposited in order to be consumed by vultures
- Stele of the Vultures, a monument from 2600–2350 BC in Mesopotamia celebrating a victory of the city-state of Lagash over its neighbour Umma
