= Vulture (ship) =

Several ships have been named Vulture for the vulture, a scavenging bird of prey:

- Vulture (1779 ship) was launched in France in 1777, captured, and became first a Liverpool privateer and then slave ship. She made some 10 voyages carrying slaves until the French captured her in 1794 early into her eleventh such voyage.
- Vulture was the French privateer Vautour launched in 1797 at Nantes that made three privateering voyages. The Royal Navy captured her in 1800 during her fourth cruise. Private owners acquired her prior to late 1801 and employed her as the whaler Vulture (English for vautour) in the South Seas whale fisheries between 1801 and 1809. A Spanish privateer captured her in 1809.
- Vulture (1798 ship) was a French prize that was in British hands by 1798. She is no longer listed after 1804.
- PS Vulture (1864), a paddle steamer used as a blockade runner during the American Civil War.

== See also ==
- HMS Vulture
- Vautour (ship)
