= Vulturine =

Vulturine may refer to:

- Vulturine guineafowl, the largest and most spectacular of the guineafowl bird family
- Vulturine parrot, a Neotropical parrot

== See also ==
- Vulture (disambiguation)
