= Vautour =

Vautour (French for "vulture") may refer to:

- Abrial A-2 Vautour, a single-seat French glider aircraft of 1925
- Sud Aviation Vautour, a French-made bomber, interceptor, and attack aircraft of the 1950s, 1960s, and 1970s used by the French and Israeli air forces
- Vautour (horse), Irish-trained racehorse
- Vautour (ship), one of a number of privateers and naval vessels

== People with the surname ==
- Jackie Vautour (1928–2021), Canadian anti-expropriation activist
- Angela Vautour (born 1960), Canadian politician
- J. R. Vautour, Canadian country singer
- Yvon Vautour (born 1956), Canadian ice hockey player
- Natacha Vautour, Canadian politician
