= Caledonia (1794 ship) =

History

Great Britain
- Name: Caledonian
- Owner: Hunter & Robertson, Greenock
- Builder: John and William Scott, Greenock
- Launched: 1 May 1794
- Captured: 1795
- Notes: This ship is often conflated with Caledonian (1797 ship), and occasionally with Caledonia of Greenock (Note: The Clyde Built Ships website, as of December 2022, reported that Caledonia sailed for the British East India Company (EIC), and that she was wrecked in 1842, while bringing timber from Quebec to Britain. The vessel that sailed for the EIC was Caledonia (1795 ship). The ship that was wrecked was Caledonia of Greenock.)

General characteristics
- Tons burthen: 647 (bm)
- Length: 137.4 ft (41.9 m)
- Beam: 34.9 ft (10.6 m)
- Draught: 18 ft (5.5 m)
- Depth: 20.8 ft (6.3 m)
- Propulsion: Sail
- Complement: 30
- Armament: 22 × 12&6-pounder guns + 4 swivel guns
- Notes: Three decks

Caledonia (or Caledonian), was launched at Greenock, Scotland, in 1794. The French captured her in 1795.

John and William Scott, of Greenock, were the premier shipbuilders in Scotland. When they built the 650-ton Caledonia she was the largest vessel built in Scotland up to that time. They built her as a "Timber ship" to carry timber to the naval dockyards in Britain. The order for Caledonia was possibly the first naval order for a ship built in Scotland. Her role was to service the naval dockyards and the private shipbuilders working on orders from the Admiralty, especially in Hampshire.

Caledonian first appeared in Lloyd's Register with Jn. Fish, master, Hunter & Co. owner, and trade Greenock—North Scotland. Captain John Fish acquired a letter of marque on 30 May 1794.

On 17 February 1795 Lloyd's List reported that Caledonian, Fish, master, was returning from New Brunswick to Plymouth with masts when the French captured her. Her captors took her into Brest.

In 1791, Scott & Co. had built Brunswick, of 600-ton (bm), for the Newfoundland trade. She and Caledonia were the largest ships built in Scotland in their years. They marked the beginning of increased activity by Scott & Co., particularly with respect to large, ocean-going ships. (Note: A privateer captured Brunswick in 1796 as Brunswick was sailing from Antigua to St Johns.)
