= HMS Dexterous (1805) =

UK gunvessel 1805–1816

History

United Kingdom
- Name: HMS Dexterous
- Ordered: June 1804
- Builder: Balthazar & Edward Adams, Buckler's Hard
- Laid down: August 1804
- Launched: 2 February 1805
- Fate: Sold 1816 for breaking up

General characteristics
- Class & type: Archer-class gunbrig
- Tons burthen: 17966/94 (bm)
- Length: Overall: 80 ft 1 1/2 in (24.4 m); Keel: 66 ft 0 in (20.1 m)
- Beam: 22 ft 7 1/2 in (6.9 m)
- Depth of hold: 9 ft 5 1/8 in (2.9 m)
- Complement: 50
- Armament: 10 × 18-pounder carronades + 2 chase guns

HMS Dexterous (or Dextrous) was a later Archer-class gunbrig launched at Buckler's Hard in 1805. Between 1805 and 1807, Dexterous was operating out of Gibraltar, where she captured two small armed vessels, one naval and one a privateer. Thereafter Dexterous operated in the Channel, where she recaptured several British merchant vessels that French privateers had captured. The Navy sold Dexterous in 1816.

== Career ==
Lieutenant Robert Tomlinson commissioned Dexterous in February 1805.

On 11 September 1805 Dexterous and Tomlinson was two leagues from Gibraltar when she encourntered a Spanish convoy of merchantman sailing from Malaga to Algeciras, escorted by eight armed vessels with a total crew of 300 men. Dexterous was able to capture Gun-boat No.4, under the command of Lieutenant Nicholas Magorga. The gun-boat was armed with one 24-pounder gun and a carronade; she had a crew of 34 men. Dexterous also captured seven merchant vessels. She was able to bring her eight prizes safely into Gibraltar Roads.

On 21 May 1806 Niger, the bomb vessel Thunder, and Dexterous were in company when they detained Trende Damen (Three Ladies).

In late May 1806 the "Dexterous Bomb" detained and sent into Gibraltar Patriot, a Danish vessel, Thompson, master, which had been sailing from Leghorn to Hambro.

In June 1807 Lieutenant Tomlinson decided to take soundings around the "Isle of Cani", at the foot of Apes Hill" (this may have been Perejil Island). He did so because he had observed that the island was a hiding place for enemy privateers. On 23 June the boat that he had sent to take the soundings came under fire from a privateer hidden among the rocks of the island. Tomlinson positioned Dexterous about half a mile from the privateer, which turned out to be two privateers, and opened fire on them. The cannon fire from Dexterous failed to sink the vessels but did drive their crews to take refuge ashore. Tomlinson then sent in his boats. The boats succeeded in bringing out Victoria, of two 6-pounder guns and a crew of 25 men under the command of Joseph Landage; one of the privateer's crew was still on board, wounded. The British were unable to bring out the second vessel as she was too well fastened and the cutting-out party had come under small-arms fire from the privateersmen who had gone ashore on the island. British casualties amounted to one marine killed and three men wounded.

On 28 September 1807 Dexterous recaptured Foresight and Falcon.

On 15 May 1808 Three Brothers, Rudd, master, came in to Milford after Dextrous had detained her. Three Brothers had come from Leghorn.

By 1809 Dexterous was in the Channel, escorting convoys and cruising against privateers.

On 9 August 1810, Dexterous recaptured the merchant vessel Rambler A French privateer had captured Rambler, Fill, master, of Yarmouth. "Dextrous" sent Rambler into the Downs. (Note: Rambler, of 88 tons (bm), was a Yarmouth-based coaster, launched in 1800, and trading with Leith)

On 29 December 1812 Dexterous recaptured Vigilant. The French privateer Jenny had captured Vigilant, Fowler, from Smyrna, Margaret, Hall, master, and Peace, Hall, master, both from Oporto as all three were on their way to London. Vautour, Tyrian, and Dexterous recaptured them and sent them into the Downs. (Note: Peace, J.Hall, master, of 406 tons (bm), had been launched at Portland in 1811. Vigilant, Fowler, master, of 211 tons (bm), had been launched at Scarborough in 1805. She traded between London and Gibraltar.)

Tomlinson was promoted to Commander on 15 June 1814.

Lieutenant William Morgan took command of Dexterous in July 1814. On 11 September 1815 Dexterous sailed westward from Deal with discharged seamen.

== Fate ==
The "Principal Officers and Commissioners of His Majesty's Navy" offered "Dexterous gun-brig, of 180 tons" for sale on 18 April 1816 at Deptford. She finally sold for £550 on 17 October 1816.
