= Martian Manhunter =

DC Comics superhero

- The Martian Manhunter as seen in promotional art for JLA: Secret Origins (January 2013). Art by Alex Ross.

Publication information
- Publisher: DC Comics
- First appearance: Detective Comics #225 (November 1955)
- Created by: Joseph Samachson; Joe Certa

In-story information
- Full name: J'onn J'onzz
- Species: Green Martian
- Place of origin: Mars
- Team affiliations: Justice League; Justice League International; Stormwatch; Justice League United; Justice League Task Force
- Partnerships: Wonder Woman; Miss Martian; Plastic Man; Superman; Batman; Vixen; Aquaman; Manhunter
- Notable aliases: John Jones; Gold Hunter; Hank Henshaw; Bloodwynd; Calvin Swanwick
- Abilities: See list: Superhuman strength, speed, agility, reflexes, stamina, endurance, metabolism, and durability; Super vision; Martian vision; Heat vision; Infrared vision; Electromagnetic spectrum vision; Microscopic vision; X-ray vision; Night vision; Shapeshifting; Elasticity; Density control; Invisibility; Intangibility; Regeneration; Bio-fusion; Extended longevity; Flight; Invulnerability; Martian nine senses; Telekinesis; Telepathy; Telepathic link relay; Telepathic assault; Mind control; Thought sensing; Pain inducement; Astral projection; Genius-level intellect; Advanced martial artist and hand-to-hand combatant; Multilingualism; Expert detective

J'onn J'onzz, better known as the Martian Manhunter, is a superhero appearing in American comic books published by DC Comics. Created by writer Joseph Samachson and artist Joe Certa, the character first appeared in the story "The Manhunter from Mars" in Detective Comics #225 (November 1955). A roster member of the Justice League of America, he is one of the seven founding members and a reoccurring member for many incarnations and derivatives.

A green-skinned alien from Mars, he is accidentally teleported to Earth and is among the last living members of his species. Motivated by tragedies that include the loss of his own family and species, Martian Manhunter becomes a superhero and protector of his adopted homeworld. While among the most powerful of superheroes on Earth, J'onn is often marked for his wisdom, gentle character, and idealism in pursuing justice, making him an ideal leader and voice of reason in iterations of the Justice League.

He has also been featured in other DC Comics products, such as video games, television series, animated films, and merchandise like action figures. In live-action, the character first appeared in the television pilot Justice League of America, played by David Ogden Stiers. He also appeared in the series Smallville, played by Phil Morris, and in the Arrowverse series Supergirl, played by David Harewood. Harry Lennix played the character in the DC Extended Universe, under the guise of General Calvin Swanwick, in the films Man of Steel (2013) and Batman v Superman: Dawn of Justice (2016), with Martian Manhunter's true form appearing in Zack Snyder's Justice League (2021).

== Publication history ==
=== Silver Age (1950s–1960s) ===
Martian Manhunter aka John (J'onn J'onzz) Jones debuted in the back-up story "The Strange Experiment of Dr. Erdel" in Detective Comics #225 (November 1955), written by Joseph Samachson and illustrated by Joe Certa. The character is a green-skinned humanoid from Mars, who is pulled to Earth by an experimental teleportation beam constructed by Dr. Saul Erdel. The Martian tells Erdel where he is from, and Erdel tells him that to send him back will require the teleportation beam's robot brain to be recalibrated, and that this may take years. J'onzz then unexpectedly uses his shapeshifting to assume the guise of a human; the shock of seeing this kills Dr. Erdel and leaves J'onzz with no way of returning home. The character decides to fight crime while waiting for Martian technology to advance to a stage that will enable his rescue. To that end, he adopts the identity of John Jones, a detective in the fictional Middletown, USA.

During this period, the character and his backstory differ in some minor and some significant ways from modern treatments. Firstly, as with his counterpart, the Silver Age Superman, J'onzz's power range is poorly defined, and his powers expand over time as the plot demands. The addition of precognitive abilities (Detective Comics #226) is quickly followed by telepathy and flight, "atomic vision", super-hearing, and many other powers. In addition, his customary weakness to fire is only manifested when he is in his native Martian form.

A more significant difference is that in this version of him, there is no suggestion that Mars is a dead planet or that the character is the last of his kind. Many of the tales of the time feature either Martian technology or the appearance of other Martian characters such as his younger brother T'om J'onzz. Detective Comics #236 (October 1956), for example, features the character making contact with the planet Mars and his parents.

J'onzz eventually reveals his existence to the world, after which he operates openly as a superhero and becomes a charter member of the Justice League. During the character's initial few years as a member of the Justice League, he is often used as a substitute for Superman in stories (just as Green Arrow was for Batman) as DC Comics were worried about using their flagship characters too often in Justice League stories, fearing overexposure. The Martian and the archer inaugurated the team-up format of The Brave and the Bold. J'onzz appears there one other time, working with the Flash. In some stories he is shown travelling through space at near-light speed or to other planets.

The detective John Jones is ostensibly killed in action by the Idol Head of Diabolu, an artifact that generates supernatural monsters. J'onzz abandons the civilian identity as he decides fighting this new menace will take a great deal of his time. At this point his feature moves to The House of Mystery, where J'onzz spends the next few years in battle against the Idol Head. Shortly after its defeat, he takes the persona of Marco Xavier to infiltrate the international crime cartel Vulture, which he defeats in the final installment of his original series.

As Superman was allowed by DC to become a fully active member of the Justice League, J'onzz's appearances there dwindled. He last participated in a mission in his original tenure in #61 (March 1968), shortly before his solo series was discontinued (The House of Mystery #173, May–June 1968). In #71, his people finally came to Earth for him and he left with them to found and become leader of New Mars. Over the next 15 years, J'onzz appeared sporadically in various DC titles.

=== Bronze Age (1970s–mid-1980s) ===
In 1972, Superman was teleported to New Mars. J'onzz briefly returned to Earth via spaceship in 1975. J'onzz made another trip to Earth shortly thereafter, leading to Superman and Batman fighting alongside him on New Mars. Three years later, he was discovered playing cosmic-level chess with Despero, using JLA-ers as the pieces. The Martian again encountered Superman in outer space. He permanently resurfaced in the DC Universe in 1984. Shortly thereafter, the League had several members resign (among many other changes), leaving an opening for the Manhunter. While staying on Earth, he decided to revive his John Jones identity, this time as a private detective, but had to explain his 20-year "disappearance".

=== Post-Crisis (mid-1980s–mid-1990s) ===
J'onn J'onzz, trying (and failing) to relax in his true form and reflecting on his history with the League

In early 1987, DC revamped its struggling Justice League of America series by re-launching the title as Justice League. This new series, written by Keith Giffen and J.M. DeMatteis with art by Kevin Maguire (and later Adam Hughes), added quirky humor to the team's stories. J'onzz is present from the first issue and within the stories is used as a straight man for other characters in comical situations. The series also added a number of elements to his back story that have remained to the present (such as J'onzz's obsession with Chocos cookies, due to Shazam's influence).

The 1988 four-issue miniseries Martian Manhunter by J.M. DeMatteis and Mark Badger further redefined the character and changed a number of important aspects of both his character and his origin story. It is revealed that Dr. Erdel did not die and that the character's humanoid appearance was due to physiological trauma and attempts to block out the death of his race, his familiar appearance a "compromise" between his true form and a human appearance based upon Erdel's mental concept of what a Martian should look like. Later series use retroactive continuity (retcon) to establish that his real form is private and that, even on Mars, his "public" appearance was the familiar version. The native name for Mars is said to be "Ma'aleca'andra" in his native language (a nod to "Malacandra", the name used by the inhabitants of Mars in C. S. Lewis' novel Out of the Silent Planet). The series also adds to canon the idea that J'onzz was not only displaced in space but in time and the Martian race, including J'onzz's wife and daughter, has been dead for thousands of years.

The 1990s saw the character continue to serve in many different versions of the Justice League of America. In addition to serving in the League under his own identity, he also joins (under duress) disguised as "Bloodwynd," a mysterious and powerful necromancer. J'onzz assumed the physical form, stand-offish mannerisms and magical powers of Bloodwynd, while Bloodwynd himself was transported and trapped inside of his "blood gem". It was during this time the JLA engaged Doomsday in The Death of Superman series. After being hurled by Doomsday into a burning building, Blue Beetle discovers the merged identity of the two heroes. Soon after, it is revealed that J'onzz accidentally bonded with Bloodwynd prior to joining the League. The two are eventually separated and both continue their associations with the League.

The 1992 miniseries American Secrets is set in the character's past, exploring a previously unknown adventure against the backdrop of a changing America during the 1950s. Written by Gerard Jones and with art by Eduardo Barreto, the series finds the Manhunter drawn into a murder mystery that rapidly escalates into paranoia and alien invasion.

=== Post-Zero Hour (mid-1990s–mid-2000s) ===
In 1997, J'onn J'onzz became a founding member of Grant Morrison and Howard Porter's new JLA where the team fought a group of White Martians, the Hyperclan.

Martian Manhunter began as an ongoing series in 1998, written by John Ostrander and illustrated by Tom Mandrake (with fill-in art provided by Bryan Hitch among others). The series lasted 38 issues before being canceled due to low sales. Ostrander established that Martian Manhunter is the most recognized hero in the Southern Hemisphere and that he maintains a number of different secret identities, many of them outside the United States, though his primary and first secret identity is still John Jones. However, after Cameron Chase reveals some of his identities to the public, he begins to use fewer secret identities. In another incident, part of his psyche splits off from his main personality, taking on the identity of John Jones before dying; the experience leads J'onn to "retire" all of his other human identities aside from Jones to honor the part of him that died.

J'onn J'onzz is a native of the planet Mars, and his parents were influential figures in Martian society: his mother, J'ahrl J'onzz, and his father, M'yrnn J'onzz. Also known as the Martian Manhunter, J'onn was the firstborn. Twins are rare on Mars, and Martian society believed that twins were meant to be a single amalgam, divided between light and darkness. His mother, a precognitive mystic, had a vision before their birth: one of her sons would become the savior of their people, while the other would bring about their destruction. J'onn grows up to become a respected law enforcement agent. Although his twin was seen as a pariah by Martian society, J'onn was the only one who loved and defended him — until the genocide of Mars, which turned the two brothers into enemies, fulfilling their mother's prophecy. The series establishes J'onzz's brother as Ma'alefa'ak, who uses his shapeshifting abilities to pose as J'onzz, capturing and torturing Jemm, Son of Saturn, and terraforming part of Earth to resemble Mars (areoforming). This is all part of a grand plan designed to convince the rest of the Justice League that J'onzz has turned into a sociopath. However, J'onzz is able to clear his name and defeat Ma'alefa'ak despite having most of his body destroyed in an exploding spaceship (he is able to regenerate his body from his severed hand after 'transplanting' his soul into his hand and sending it back to his home fortress so that it can regenerate).

The series also further established the history of both the Manhunter and the Saturnian race. The first issue revealed that there was a "real" John Jones, a human police detective who was murdered by corrupt colleagues, and that J'onzz subsequently assumed his identity to complete an important court case. He kept Jones' form upon realizing that he could use his prior training in law enforcement as a means of blending in with humanity.

In issues of JLA written by Joe Kelly, J'onzz attempts to conquer his fear of fire and makes a deal with a flame-wielding villainess named Scorch, who wants J'onzz's telepathic help in dealing with her own mental issues, the two falling in love in the process. This effort results in J'onzz briefly transforming into the Burning Martian, Fernus, an ancient version of the Martian race that were modified by the Guardians of the Universe; the Guardians had recognized the danger that the Burning Martians posed to civilized life as they 'reproduced' through the psychic energy generated by suffering and grief, but had simply engineered the Martians into their new state rather than destroy them. As part of this engineering, the Martians had been 'programmed' with a new vulnerability to fire, with J'onzz breaking the genetic blocks against fire, also giving him access to race memories of the Burning Martians. Despite Fernus' power, the League were able to help J'onzz reassert himself over Fernus, Manitou Raven helping key League members access J'onzz's mind and draw out his true self while Plastic Man battled Fernus directly, allowing the true J'onzz to manifest when Fernus attempted to spawn using the psychic grief caused by the destruction of the city of Chongjin, the sorrow enough for at least one spawning even if the Flash had saved the city's residents. With Fernus' physical form defeated, J'onzz's traditional aversion to fire was redefined, as he is now invulnerable to flames unless they are "flames of passion" or of some other "psychic significance". This change is forgotten about in later series and adventures.

=== Crisis era (mid-2000s–early-2010s) ===
Textless cover of Martian Manhunter (vol. 3) #2 (November 2006), art by Al Barrionuevo

Several weeks before World War III, Martian Manhunter disguises himself as a young girl and tries to defeat Black Adam telepathically in Bialya. He is defeated by being exposed to Adam's darkest memories and flees Earth. The miniseries World War III is told from his perspective. Using these events as a catalyst, DC Comics redesigned the appearance of the character to alter his costume, covering his chest, and giving him an appearance that more closely resembles that of his original Martian form. Those changes were further explored during a Martian Manhunter miniseries that spun out of the DCU: Brave New World one-shot. Written by A.J. Lieberman with art from Al Barrionuevo and Bit, the series portrayed Martian Manhunter as more mistrustful of humanity and their actions towards each other. The main narrative centered on J'onzz's search for other survivors of Mars.

During the lead-up to the Infinite Crisis miniseries, the character is feared to have been killed in an attack on the Justice League's HQ. He is later revealed to be alive and a captive of Alexander Luthor Jr. After Infinite Crisis, most of DC's series jumped ahead one year, with the weekly series 52 revealing what happened during the timeskip. In 52 #24, it is revealed that Martian Manhunter has been working behind the scenes in an unsuccessful attempt to destroy Checkmate for its role in the death of his colleague Ted Kord.

Following this miniseries, J'onzz was intended to be in Outsiders. He appeared in the third issue of the Outsiders: Five of a Kind series with Thunder, and joined the team afterward. Due to the change of writers, he was quickly written out within the last two issues. He was next seen working undercover during the events of the limited series Salvation Run. At the end of the series, J'onzz is left captured and alone on an alien planet.

In Final Crisis #1 (2008), written by Grant Morrison the character is killed, with the death being further developed in the one-shot Final Crisis: Requiem. The character next appears in the Blackest Night storyline as a Black Lantern. At the end of the miniseries, the character is resurrected. Following this, the character is featured in the weekly series Brightest Day. During the series, J'onzz encounters another surviving Green Martian, D'kay D'razz, a scarred and warped psychopath who wants J'onzz to be her mate.

In Brightest Day, he is a very prominent character, finding a water source on Mars and meeting and talking with the daughter of Dr. Erdel, Melissa. J'onzz is depicted tucking her into bed in a retirement home, in the form of her father. He later appears at Erdel's old lab. However, plant life starts to die every time he gets near. Later still, J'onzz goes to see M'gann M'orzz in Australia during her mediation search, but finds her beaten and tied up. While tending to her, he is contacted by the Life Entity, who instructs him to burn down the newly formed forest. When J'onzz asks M'gann who did this to her, M'gann says she was attacked by a female Green Martian. After this, J'onzz senses something in Star City. J'onzz arrives in Star City's new forest and attempts to complete his task; however, he is stopped from doing that by the Entity. The Entity reveals to him that the newly formed forest J'onzz is to burn down is on Mars. After J'onzz lashes out at Star City's forest, he returns home. During this same time period, J'onzz is found by Green Arrow, who attacks J'onzz after mistaking him for some sort of monster. After being knocked unconscious and dragged out of the forest by Green Arrow, J'onzz explains that the forest somehow tampered with his shapeshifting abilities and temporarily drove him mad. When J'onzz arrives home, he sees his planet covered in a newly formed forest on Mars.

When J'onzz enters his home, he is confronted by a female Green Martian named D'kay D'razz, the same Green Martian who attacked M'gann. D'kay explains her origins and wants to be J'onzz's mate. J'onzz refuses and learns that she is a psychopath when D'kay angrily lashes out to attack and enters his mind. J'onzz tries to resist influence from D'kay's mind, but her control over his mind tempts him with visions of a fantasy world where all the Martians and J'onzz's family are resurrected by the Entity. While reunited with his lost family, J'onzz discovers that they are false and realizes that they are a ruse and the death corpse is carved of Martian symbols of love and hate from D'kay's influence. J'onzz arrives vengeful and wrings her neck in disgust. He then defeats D'kay by forcing her into the Sun, saved from the same fate by the Life Entity, who informs him that his mission has been accomplished, and returns his life to him. The Entity then tells J'onzz to choose between Mars and Earth. J'onzz chooses Earth and returns to his adopted homeworld only to be absorbed into the earth by the Entity as "part of the plan".

When the "Dark Avatar" makes his presence known, J'onzz is revealed to be one of the Elementals. Martian Manhunter is transformed by the Entity to become the element of Earth to protect the Star City forest from the "Dark Avatar", which appears to be the Black Lantern version of the Swamp Thing. The Elementals are then fused with the body of Alec Holland to transform him into Swamp Thing and battle the Dark Avatar. After the Dark Avatar is defeated, Swamp Thing restores J'onzz to normal. Afterward, J'onzz helps Melissa Erdel remove the piece from her head after she loses her mind.

=== The New 52 (2011–2016) ===
In 2011, DC relaunched its continuity following its Flashpoint company-wide crossover as part of its The New 52 publishing event, which saw the cancellation and relaunch of all DC titles. In the new continuity, J'onzz is reintroduced as a member of the covert Stormwatch organization, which had previously appeared exclusively in comics set in DC's Wildstorm Comics imprint. J'onzz is initially stated as being an ex-Justice League member in Stormwatch #1, before the phrase "with the Justice League" is retconned as shorthand for being a public superhero, with J'onzz saying he never tried to join the League due to his commitments to Stormwatch. This same position is stated by J'onzz again in Legion Lost (vol. 2) #6. However, later Justice League comics show that J'onzz was indeed a member of the League for a time. Later, DC chose to move Martian Manhunter to its Justice League of America title, a spin-off from Justice League. In Stormwatch (vol. 3) #12, J'onzz quits the team and uses his telepathy to erase his existence from the minds of his Stormwatch teammates.

In Justice League of America, Martian Manhunter is a member of the U.S. government-sponsored Justice League, taking orders from Amanda Waller and Steve Trevor. Like other members of the team, he has been selected as a counterpart for a member of the independent Justice League, should they ever go rogue; J'onzz is Superman's counterpart. He also appears in Justice League; when Despero assaults the Watchtower, he is mentioned by Firestorm as having been a member of the Justice League when it initially fought with Despero. When Despero incapacitates Firestorm, Element Woman, and the Atom, Martian Manhunter appears and defeats him with a telepathic assault. Working with his JLA colleagues in Justice League of America, he investigates the activities of the Secret Society of Super Villains, led by the Outsider. Later, the two Leagues meet, along with the supernaturally-powered Justice League Dark in the "Trinity War" crossover storyline because of a diplomatic crisis in Kahndaq triggered by the young superhero Shazam. The three Leagues are gathered together when the Outsider reveals himself to be an evil counterpart of Batman's butler Alfred Pennyworth from Earth-Three, and witnesses the arrival of Earth-Three's evil Justice League's counterparts, the Crime Syndicate. The three Leagues are soundly defeated, and Martian Manhunter is trapped in the Firestorm matrix along with his colleagues by Firestorm's evil counterpart Deathstorm. While inside Firestorm, for the duration of the Forever Evil-themed issues of the Justice League of America title, Manhunter and Stargirl shared a close adventure interlinked with one another's memories as Despero assisted the Syndicate with keeping the JLA imprisoned. After being freed in Forever Evil #7, the two remain close friends, and along with Green Arrow go on to form the core of a new successor Justice League based out of Canada, in Justice League United.

J'onn's new origin is revealed in vol. 4 of Martian Manhunter (2015–2016). When he lived there, Mars was originally a living, thriving world millions of years ago. After received a psychic warning, a young J'onn was recruited along with others by the Martian government to investigate a potential threat. He was eventually betrayed by Ma'alefa'ak, who murdered all of the subjects except J'onn. He was then subjected to a magic blood ritual that gave him his powers. After escaping, he began to hunt down Ma'alefa'ak, only to discover a monster which was the cause of the psychic warning. The monster, taking the shape of J'onn J'onzz's son, revealed that it was the physical manifestation of Mars, saying that it needed help, only to believe that the Martians were unworthy of life. As a result, Mars and all of its inhabitants died and J'onn was sent to Earth. Before he landed, he split himself into multiply identities that would not reunite until millions of years later but with no memories of his origins.

Martian Manhunter seemingly died while trying to stop a series of bombings. However, it was revealed that there were still pieces of him that lived on after he landed on Earth, and they began to bring him back together. After being teleported to an alternate Mars, Ma'alefa'ak, revealed to be another construct of J'onn's memories, plans to use them in another ritual to bring back the actual Mars with himself as its ruler. After this plan was foiled, J'onn is revived with all of the remaining constructs merging back with him, finally coming to accept that he truly is the last Martian.

=== DC Rebirth (2016–present) ===
Prior to the events of Dark Nights: Metal, Martian Manhunter leaves Thanagar looking for Nth Metal. After freeing an imprisoned Mister Terrific, Green Lantern, and Plastic Man, three Dark Knights appear and use Thanagar's Phoenix Cannon to fire Plastic Man at Earth's core, causing a chain reaction that will drag everything into the Dark Multiverse. He is imprisoned by the Dark Knights along with other heroes before being rescued by Wonder Woman. Following the conclusion of No Justice, he rejoins the Justice League as its new chairman.

== Powers and abilities ==
J'onzz possesses a wide variety of abilities native to the Green Martian race such as super-strength, nigh-invulnerability, superspeed, flight, regeneration, shapeshifting, intangibility, invisibility, telepathy, telekinesis, and heat vision.

=== Physical ===
The Martian Manhunter has shapeshifting abilities. He often takes the human disguise of Detective John Jones. He has often been shown to grow an extra pair of arms to supplement his fighting abilities and his strength, such as when he helped move 1/3 of the Earth with Superman and Wonder Woman, knocked out Shazam once, stopping a ship many times larger than the planet from colliding with Earth in tandem with Superman, and destroying the Moon whose gravity was increased a billionfold to the point it was tearing off the Earth's crust and ejecting every continent into the atmosphere. He can become stiff or malleable, as well as alter the size and length of limbs. He has elongated parts of himself into bladed weapons during combat. His density is also variable and changes as he wills it. He can use this ability to become intangible and move through objects or allow attacks to fly harmlessly through him or to become extremely dense and increase his invulnerability. J'onzz can also become invisible. In addition to these powers, he can fly and possesses super strength.

=== Psionic/mental/psychic and extrasensory ===
J'onn J'onzz is the most powerful telepath on Earth, being able to control and affect even the Spectre and Doctor Fate with his telepathy. Aquaman has stated that Martian Manhunter's telepathy exceeds even the telepathy of other members of the Martian race. He said that with J'onzz's great telepathic power, his own telepathy just "pings" off of him while, when Aquaman was in the presence of J'onzz's brother, Ma'alefa'ak, there was no such effect. J'onzz is capable of linking the minds of all superheroes at once from a distance of the Moon to all corners of Earth, even once scanning the entire galaxy to see if anyone was not experiencing a brief moment of transcendent bliss. He is also capable of reading the minds of all inhabitants of Earth at once. His telepathic abilities also allow him to create realistic illusions; telepathically trace and locate people; shut down people's minds; brain blast; mental shield; influence thoughts; mind control people; manipulate memory; astral projection; possession; induce sleep; reprogram or reorder minds; and transfer information directly into people's brains. Martian Manhunter's mind control capabilities have allowed him to mind control the Joker and make him temporarily sane, as well as mind controlling several White Martians at once. He is also capable of mentally shielding those around him from telepathic assault. His own mental defenses are so strong that he is able to telepathically shield himself from the combined might of several White Martians and from the Mageddon machinery. He has at times also demonstrated limited telekinetic abilities, though such showings are rare and often forgotten.

=== Enhanced Martian senses ===
J'onzz possesses "Martian vision" allowing his eyes to see across the electromagnetic spectrum, including X-ray vision. He can also project energy beams, known as "Martian beams", the exact effects of which have varied in different decades from incendiary effects to concussive impacts to disintegration. J'onzz also has nine senses compared to humans, giving him clearer and more numerous perceptions.

=== Natural skills and talents ===
Aside from his superpowered abilities as a Martian, J'onzz is also a master detective and sleuth. Due to his training as a Manhunter on Mars, he is also an expert tracker and hand-to-hand combatant, far above the average Martian, as he has been shown able to defeat many White Martians at once. As Batman mentions in his file, "in many ways, Martian Manhunter is like an amalgam of Superman and the Dark Knight himself".

=== Weakness and limitations ===
One of J'onzz's signature traits is his vulnerability to fire. Although it has been an element of the character since his earliest appearances, it has been depicted differently by writers.

In his earliest appearances, he was shown as having a weakness to fire while in his native Martian form. Over time, this was developed into pyrophobia, with fire being the Martian's "Achilles heel", similar to Superman's weakness to kryptonite, only DC had a tendency to be more willing to make the manhunter look weak. Exposure to fire typically causes J'onzz to lose his ability to maintain his physical form and melt into plasma. One portrayal explained that the flame weakness was tied into Martian telepathy, with fire causing so much chaos in Martian minds that they collapse. The Trial By Fire storyline reveals that the Martian weakness to fire is a psychosomatic effect created by the Guardians of the Universe to prevent the species from reverting to a previous, highly aggressive evolutionary state. At the end of the arc, this weakness to mundane fire was removed, with J'onzz explaining that now only fires of "psychic significance" could harm him, such as flames of a magical or pyrokinetic nature, or even flames created by an arsonist.

In The New 52, the weakness to fire is pyrophobia that is unique to him as a crippling anxiety, due to the trauma of witnessing the Martians' extinction.

== List of enemies ==
The following are enemies of Martian Manhunter:

- Bel Juz – A Green Martian who survived the fate of Mars and used her womanly wiles and devious mind to manipulate those around her. After Mars is rendered uninhabitable, Bel Juz flees to the planet Vonn with other Green Martians. Bel betrays her people to the Thythen, invaders who had driven out Vonn's native. The Thythen employed cybernetics to enslave the Green Martians, with Bel Juz being the only survivor.
- B'enn B'urnzz – A Martian criminal from the future who returns to the present to wreak havoc.
- Bette Noir – A genetically engineered clone with telepathic powers. She often projects the illusion of being a beautiful woman.
- B'rett – A Yellow Martian convict who escaped captivity to Earth by stowing away in an experimental missile that overshot its mark. He landed in Middletown, USA, where he immediately went on a destructive rampage. He carries a Martian Ray Gun that destroys most things it hits.
- Cay'an – One of the few surviving Green Martians, Cay'an brainwashed a group of White Martians to attack Martian Manhunter.
- Commander Blanx – The leader of the polar-dwelling White Martians, enemies of the desert-dwelling Green Martians. In pre-Crisis continuity, he killed the Martian race.
- Despero – A Justice League of America villain who murdered the parents of J'onn's protégé Gypsy and his teammate Steel. J'onn in turn is responsible for some of Despero's most humiliating defeats, leading to a strong mutual enmity between the two characters.
- D'kay D'razz – A Green Martian who was imprisoned after experimenting on other Martians who were not connected to the communal Martian telepathic mind. Following the Martian extinction, D'kay is left alone and driven insane before Saul Erdel transports her to Earth. In desperation, D'kay steals the identity of a human and erases all memory of her previous identity. However, she regains her memories following the death and resurrection of Martian Manhunter in Final Crisis and Blackest Night.
- The Getaway King – Monty Moran, a criminal scientist, uses futuristic gimmicks of his own design to help his gang make safe and spectacular getaways from crimes. After learning that Moran uses a force field, Martian Manhunter secretly manipulates him and his gang into turning themselves in.
- The Headmaster – Real name: Thaddeus Romero Hoskins, an arrogant elitist and child prodigy born to a rich family. Fearing that humanity will die if it remains on Earth, Hoskins develops a military robot consisting of an inhuman head attached to spider-like legs. Dubbed a "Headman", the robot is able to decapitate enemies and reanimate their bodies to act as cannon fodder for its controllers. Later on, Hoskins beheads himself and transfers his mind into a cybernetic body, calling himself the Headmaster.
- The Prophet – K'rkzar is a prophet who J'onn sought out K'rkzar for information about potential living Martians. However, the reptilian church head Paral forces J'onn to battle and kill K'rkzar.
- The Human Flame – A villain who wore a special suit that allowed him to project fire. He was the first actual supervillain Martian Manhunter faced.
- Kanto – Darkseid's master assassin, he fought J'onn during the attack on Mars. The two have been bitter rivals ever since.
- Ma'alefa'ak (also called Malefic) – The twin brother and archenemy of Martian Manhunter, who lacks telepathy and a weakness to fire. After being ostracized, Ma'alefa'ak takes revenge by killing the Martians with a fiery curse.
- The Marshal – A genetically enhanced Martian warrior who attempted to invade Earth.
- The Master Gardener – The Master Gardener and his shapeshifting assistant the Lizard Man came to Earth during World War II, and took advantage of the terror and confusion of the time to infiltrate governments and communications cartels. They grew plants bearing fungus that bonded to the human nervous system, allowing them to control the very words they spoke under threat of spontaneous combustion.
- Mister V – a.k.a. Faceless; leader of Vulture.
- Professor Arnold Hugo – An evil genius. Originally a Batman enemy, in his second appearance he fought J'onn and went on to become his first recurring foe.
- Robo-Chargers – Colossal, robotic beings who are designed for war, powered by the life force of living beings, and employed by the Thythen to police the planet Vonn.
- Thythen – Alien warmongers who previously invaded the planet Vonn.
- TOR – A robot created by the Martians to serve them. After a scientist accidentally gives TOR a thought-control card, it becomes a criminal before being exiled to the planet Turas. After escaping to Earth, TOR possesses gangster Marty Kirk in an effort to save itself before J'onn exorcises him.
- Vulture – An international crime syndicate whom J'onn infiltrated for some time before finally destroying them.
- White Martians – A warlike offshoot of the Martian race. They are a polar-dwelling race and enemies of the desert-dwelling Green Martians.
- Yellow Martians – Another offshoot of the Martian race about which nothing is currently known.

== Other versions ==
Many alternate universe versions of Martian Manhunter have appeared throughout the character's publication history. In Kingdom Come, Martian Manhunter lost most of his powers and became trapped in human form following an attempt to understand humanity by attempting to open his mind to all human thoughts at once. On Earth-Three, Martian Manhunter is a member of the Crime Syndicate. In DC: The New Frontier, Martian Manhunter was transported to Earth in the 1950s and became a detective and member of the Justice League amidst his attempts to return to Mars. In Dark Knights of Steel, Martian Manhunter is a composite character who assumed the identity of Alfred Pennyworth. In Absolute Martian Manhunter, John Jones is an FBI agent who is possessed by the Martian, an otherworldly being with no physical form.

=== Homages, pastiches, and parodies ===
- The Martian Anteater – A member of the Just'a Lotta Animals.
- Jack from Jupiter – A member of the Seven in The Boys.
- Mr. Martian / CH'kk Kk'xx / Chuck Cox from Big Bang Comics
- Martian Man of the Guardians of the Globe and Shapesmith, both from the series Invincible.
- Vigilante from Venus – A female character from Top Ten
- Skrullian Skymaster of the Squadron Supreme from Marvel Comics
- Pseudo, a shapeshifting alien telepath and member of the Freedom League from Mutants & Masterminds
- Stalker of Stormwatch
- Mark Markz from Jeff Lemire's Black Hammer

== In other media ==
=== Television ===
==== Live-action ====
- J'onn J'onzz appears in Justice League of America, portrayed by David Ogden Stiers. This version only displays shapeshifting capabilities, which he experiences difficulty with, being able to impersonate others for a short period of time.
- Martian Manhunter appears in Smallville, portrayed by Phil Morris. This version is an old friend of Jor-El who came to Earth to monitor Kal-El and assist him when necessary. After losing his powers in the eighth season, Manhunter joins the Metropolis Police Department before Doctor Fate helps him restore his powers in the ninth season.
- Martian Manhunter appears in media set in the Arrowverse, portrayed by David Harewood.
  - First appearing in the TV series Supergirl, this version lived on Earth for 50 years as an alien refugee, operates under the guise of Hank Henshaw, who seemingly died in a failed attempt to kill him, and became the director of the Department of Extranormal Operations (DEO). Despite eventually being forced to reveal his identity, Manhunter continues to use Henshaw's form to facilitate human interactions.
  - Manhunter also appears in the TV series The Flash episode "Duet" and the crossover "Crisis on Infinite Earths".

==== Animation ====
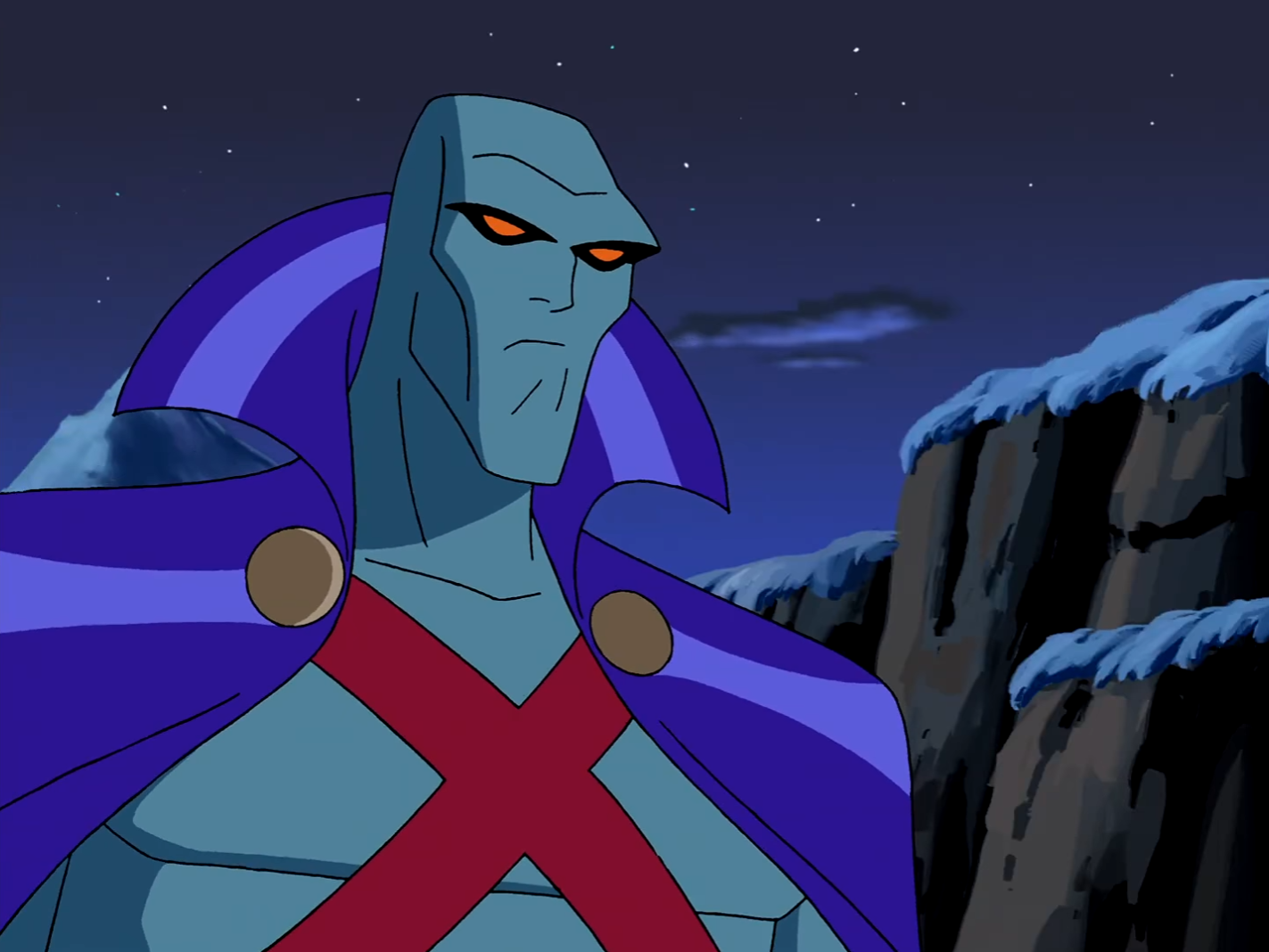
Martian Manhunter in the Justice League TV series

- J'onn J'onzz appears in series set in the DC Animated Universe (DCAU), voiced by Carl Lumbly in a South African accent. This version was rendered the last surviving Martian after the species was killed in an extended war with the alien Imperium. Following his introduction in Justice League, J'onzz makes subsequent appearances in Static Shock and Justice League Unlimited. In the latter series, he serves as the expanded League's mission coordinator before temporarily leaving them in the third season to explore Earth.
- Martian Manhunter appears in The Batman, voiced by Dorian Harewood. This version is a founding member of the Justice League and personally recruited Batman into it.
- Martian Manhunter appears in Young Justice, voiced by Kevin Michael Richardson. This version is not the last of his kind, a member of the Justice League, and uncle of Miss Martian.
- Martian Manhunter appears in Batman: The Brave and the Bold, voiced by Nicholas Guest. This version is a member of Justice League International.
- Martian Manhunter appears in Mad, voiced by Gary Anthony Williams.
- Martian Manhunter appears in Justice League Action, voiced by Crispin Freeman. This version is a member of the Justice League.
- Martian Manhunter appears in the Kite Man: Hell Yeah! episode "Hero Stuff, Hell Yeah!", voiced by Phil LaMarr.

=== Film ===
==== Live-action ====
Martian Manhunter as he appears in Zack Snyder's Justice League (2021).

- Martian Manhunter was meant to appear in George Miller's unproduced film Justice League: Mortal, portrayed by Hugh Keays-Byrne.
- Martian Manhunter appears in films set in the DC Extended Universe (DCEU), portrayed by Harry Lennix.
  - In a series of comments made by director Zack Snyder on his social media page, he responded to a fan theory that Lennix's character from Man of Steel and Batman v Superman: Dawn of Justice, General, later Secretary of Defense, Calvin Swanwick, was actually J'onn J'onzz / Martian Manhunter; stating that it is a theory that he would consider. Lennix himself later stated that though he was not playing the character as Martian Manhunter, "someone else" had wanted him to be the character in a future film.
  - Snyder later stated on Vero that Swanwick was going to be Martian Manhunter in the original cut of Justice League, but the scene was not completed before he left the project. Lennix would however reprise his role as Swanwick / Martian Manhunter in Zack Snyder's Justice League.

==== Animation ====
- Martian Manhunter appears in Justice League: The New Frontier, voiced by Miguel Ferrer. This version was teleported to Earth from Mars during the 1950s and adopted a human disguise to avoid detection from the U.S. government. While accomplishing the latter, he became a detective for the Gotham City Police Department.
- Martian Manhunter appears in Justice League: Crisis on Two Earths, voiced by Jonathan Adams. This version is a member of the Justice League. Additionally, an alternate universe variant named J'edd J'arkus makes a cameo appearance as a boss of the Crime Syndicate.
- Martian Manhunter appears in Justice League: Doom, voiced again by Carl Lumbly. This version is a member of the Justice League.
- Martian Manhunter appears in Lego Batman: The Movie - DC Super Heroes Unite, voiced by Cam Clarke.
- Martian Manhunter appears in Lego DC Comics Super Heroes: Justice League – Attack of the Legion of Doom, voiced by Dee Bradley Baker.
- Martian Manhunter makes a non-speaking cameo appearance in Lego DC Comics Super Heroes: Justice League: Cosmic Clash.
- Martian Manhunter appears in films set in the DC Animated Movie Universe (DCAMU):
  - He makes a non-speaking cameo appearance in Justice League Dark as a member of the Justice League.
  - Manhunter appears in The Death of Superman and Reign of the Supermen, voiced by Nyambi Nyambi.
  - Manhunter makes a non-speaking appearance in Justice League Dark: Apokolips War.
- Martian Manhunter appears in The Lego Batman Movie.
- Martian Manhunter appears in Scooby-Doo! & Batman: The Brave and the Bold, voiced again by Nicholas Guest.
- Martian Manhunter makes a cameo appearance in Teen Titans Go! To the Movies.
- Martian Manhunter makes a non-speaking appearance in Batman and Superman: Battle of the Super Sons.
- Martian Manhunter appears in films set in the Tomorrowverse, voiced by Ike Amadi.
  - Introduced in Superman: Man of Tomorrow, he is an initially mysterious figure who knows of Superman's Kryptonian history and helps him fight Parasite and Lobo.
  - Manhunter appears in Green Lantern: Beware My Power as a member of the Justice League.
  - Manhunter appears in Justice League: Warworld, where he is captured by Mongul and used to create psychic illusions to keep the latter's captives in line. Eventually, he escapes and destroys Mongul's Warworld using a bomb created by the alien Largas, seemingly dying in the process.
  - Manhunter appears in Justice League: Crisis on Infinite Earths.

=== Video games ===
- Martian Manhunter appears as a playable character in Justice League Heroes, voiced by Daniel Riordan.
- Martian Manhunter appears as a non-playable character (NPC) in Justice League Heroes: The Flash.
- Martian Manhunter appears in Justice League: Injustice for All.
- Martian Manhunter appears in Justice League: Chronicles.
- Martian Manhunter appears as a NPC in DC Universe Online, voiced by Dwight Schultz.
- Martian Manhunter appears as a playable character in Infinite Crisis, voiced again by Carl Lumbly.
- The regular, Earth Elemental, and White Lantern incarnations of Martian Manhunter appear as character summons in Scribblenauts Unmasked: A DC Comics Adventure.
- Martian Manhunter appears in Injustice: Gods Among Us, voiced again by Carl Lumbly. He initially appears as a background NPC in the Watchtower stage and a support card in the mobile version before appearing as a playable character in the main version via DLC. Additionally, an alternate universe variant appears in the story mode disguised as an Atlantean and Aquaman's royal archivist (voiced by Alan Tudyk).
- Martian Manhunter appears as a playable character in DC Unchained.

==== Lego ====
- Martian Manhunter appears as a playable character in Lego Batman 2: DC Super Heroes, voiced by Cam Clarke. This version is a member of the Justice League.
- Martian Manhunter appears as a playable character in Lego Batman 3: Beyond Gotham, voiced by Ike Amadi.
- Martian Manhunter appears as a playable character in Lego DC Super-Villains, voiced again by Ike Amadi.

=== Merchandise ===
The Arrowverse and Young Justice incarnations of Martian Manhunter received figures in Mattel's "DC Multiverse" line.

=== Miscellaneous ===
- J'onn J'onzz appears in the novel The Last Days of Krypton, by Kevin Anderson.
- J'onn J'onzz appears in the novel DC Universe: Last Sons, by Alan Grant. He joins forces with Superman and Lobo to survive a group of hunters seeking to destroy all life while preserving one last specimen of each species.
- Martian Manhunter appears in Legion of Super Heroes in the 31st Century #11. This version, in the year 2112, led the "Great Reconstruction", a process of reviving the Martians from near-extinction and helping other species colonize Mars. This led him to be venerated by the Hyperclan, a group of 31st-century Martian separatists who believe in protecting Mars from outside influence.
- The Injustice incarnation of Martian Manhunter appears in the Injustice: Gods Among Us prequel comic. After the Joker destroys Metropolis and Superman murders him, among other supervillains, Manhunter joins Batman's Insurgency and assumes the captured Hawkgirl's place in Superman's Regime to serve as a mole until he is eventually forced to expose himself and release Hawkgirl to help Batman escape the Regime. Confronting Superman, Manhunter questions his actions and attacks Wonder Woman. When Martian Manhunter phases into Wonder Woman's body, Superman uses his heat vision on her, causing Martian Manhunter to bail and fall into the ocean.
- Martian Manhunter appears in The Sandman podcast, voiced by Reginald D. Hunter.

== Collected editions ==
Title	Material collected	Published date	ISBN
Showcase Presents: Martian Manhunter Vol. 1	Batman (vol. 1) #78, Detective Comics #225-304	August 2007	978-1401213688
Showcase Presents: Martian Manhunter Vol. 2	Detective Comics #305-326, House of Mystery #143-173	May 2009	978-1401222567
Martian Manhunter Vol. 1: Son of Mars	Martian Manhunter (vol. 2) #0-9	March 2014	978-1401243869
Martian Manhunter Vol. 2: Rings of Saturn	Martian Manhunter (vol. 2) #10-17, #1,000,000	September 2014	978-1401251413
Martian Manhunter: The Others Among Us	Martian Manhunter (vol. 3) #1-8 and material from DCU: Brave New World #1	July 2007	978-1401213350
Martian Manhunter Vol. 1: The Epiphany	Martian Manhunter (vol. 4) #1-6 and material from Convergence: Adventures of Superman #2	February 2016	978-1401261511
Martian Manhunter Vol. 2: The Red Rising	Martian Manhunter (vol. 4) #7-12, Justice League of America (vol. 4) #5	December 2016	978-1401265328
DC Meets Looney Tunes	Martian Manhunter/Marvin the Martian Special #1 and Batman/Elmer Fudd Special #1, Jonah Hex/Yosemite Sam Special #1, Wonder Woman/Tasmanian Devil Special #1, Lobo/Roadrunner Special #1, Legion of Super-Heroes/Bugs Bunny Special #1	February 2018	978-1401277574
Martian Manhunter: Identity	Martian Manhunter (vol. 5) #1-12	June 2020	978-1779500441

== See also ==
- Miss Martian
- Jemm
- Faceless Hunters
- One Year Later
- White Martian
- John Carter of Mars

== Notes ==
Note 1: Roh Kar, Lawman of Mars, appeared in an earlier story "The Manhunter From Mars" in Batman #78 (August–September 1953). Some analysts have noted similarities between Roh Kar and the Martian Manhunter and the theory that the earlier story served as inspiration for Samachson and Certa's Martian Manhunter has been advanced.
