= HMS Niger (1759) =

Frigate of the Royal Navy

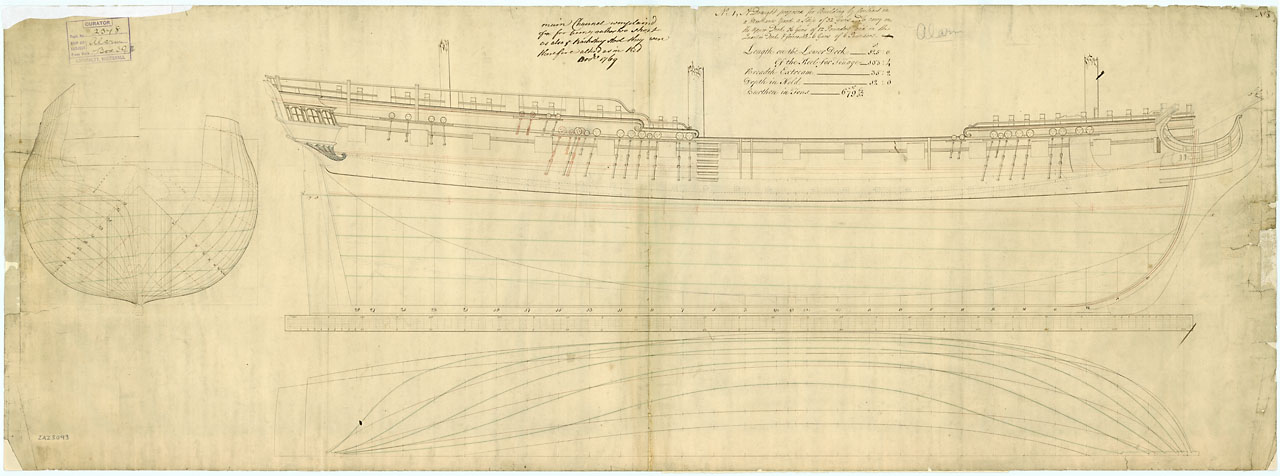
- HMS Niger hull plan

History

Great Britain
- Name: HMS Niger
- Namesake: Niger River
- Ordered: 19 September 1757
- Builder: Sheerness Dockyard
- Laid down: 7 February 1758
- Launched: 25 September 1759
- Completed: By November 1759
- Renamed: HMS Negro in 1813
- Honours and awards: Naval General Service Medal with clasp "Egypt"
- Fate: Sold for breaking up on 29 September 1814

General characteristics
- Class & type: Niger-class fifth rate frigate
- Tons burthen: 67967/94 bm
- Length: 125 ft (38 m) (gundeck); 103 ft 4 in (31.50 m) (keel)
- Beam: 35 ft 2 in (10.72 m)
- Depth of hold: 12 ft (3.7 m)
- Sail plan: Full-rigged ship
- Complement: 220
- Armament: As built; Upper gundeck: 26 × 12-pounder guns; QD: 4 × 6-pounder guns; Fc: 2 × 6-pounder guns; 12 × 1/2-pdr swivels; After 1794; Upper gundeck: 26 × 12-pounder guns; QD: 4 × 6-pounder guns + 4 × 24-pounder carronades; Fc: 2 × 6-pounder guns + 2 × 24-pounder carronades

HMS Niger was a 32-gun Niger-class fifth rate frigate of the Royal Navy.

== History ==
She was launched in 1759.

In 1766, under the command of Sir Thomas Adams, Niger travelled to Newfoundland and Labrador. (Note: Sir Thomas Adams was Niger's captain from March 1763 until 1767. His father, Sir Robert Adams, was a London solicitor, his mother's name was Diana. Sir Thomas was baptized in St Pancras Church, London on 17 February 1738. He inherited a baronetcy on the death of his father, but died without issue in April 1770.) Also on board were Constantine Phipps, and the English botanist Joseph Banks. The purpose of the journey was to transport a party of mariners to Chateau Bay, Newfoundland and Labrador to build a fort, to continue strengthening relations with the native population, and to survey some of the coast of Newfoundland.

Banks collected many species of plants and animals during that journey, including many which were previously unknown or undescribed by Europeans. In 1766 Banks met James Cook briefly in St John's, through their mutual friend Thomas Adams. This meeting would lead to Banks joining Cook on his first circumnavigation from 1769 to 1771.

During the American Revolutionary War in 1776, Niger briefly engaged Gurnet Fort guarding Plymouth, Massachusetts, while searching for patriot privateers. Niger grounded but was soon refloated. Plymouth Light was damaged, but there were no other casualties.

On 14 March, 1778, under command of Captain Robert Lambert, she captured schooner Sukey off Monti Christi, Spanish Santo Domingo. On 18 March She pursued and captured sloop Dove after she ran aground 2 or 3 miles off Monti Christi. Dove was refloated and sent to Jamaica. On 19 March she captured French brig St. Joseph 4 or 5 leagues off Monti Christi. On 1 April, 1778 she captured schooners Angelina and Adventure. On 6 June 1778 she captured and burned a brig.

Because Niger served in the navy's Egyptian campaign (8 March to 8 September 1801), her officers and crew qualified for the clasp "Egypt" to the Naval General Service Medal that the Admiralty issued in 1847 to all surviving claimants. (Note: A first-class share of the prize money awarded in April 1823 was worth £34 2s 4d; a fifth-class share, that of a seaman, was worth 3s 11½d. The amount was small as the total had to be shared between 79 vessels and the entire army contingent.)

On 21 May 1806 Niger was in company with the bomb vessel Thunder and the brig Dexterous when they detained Trende Damen (Three Ladies).

== Fate ==
The Navy converted Niger to a prison hospital ship in May 1809, and renamed her Negro in 1813. She was sold in 1814.

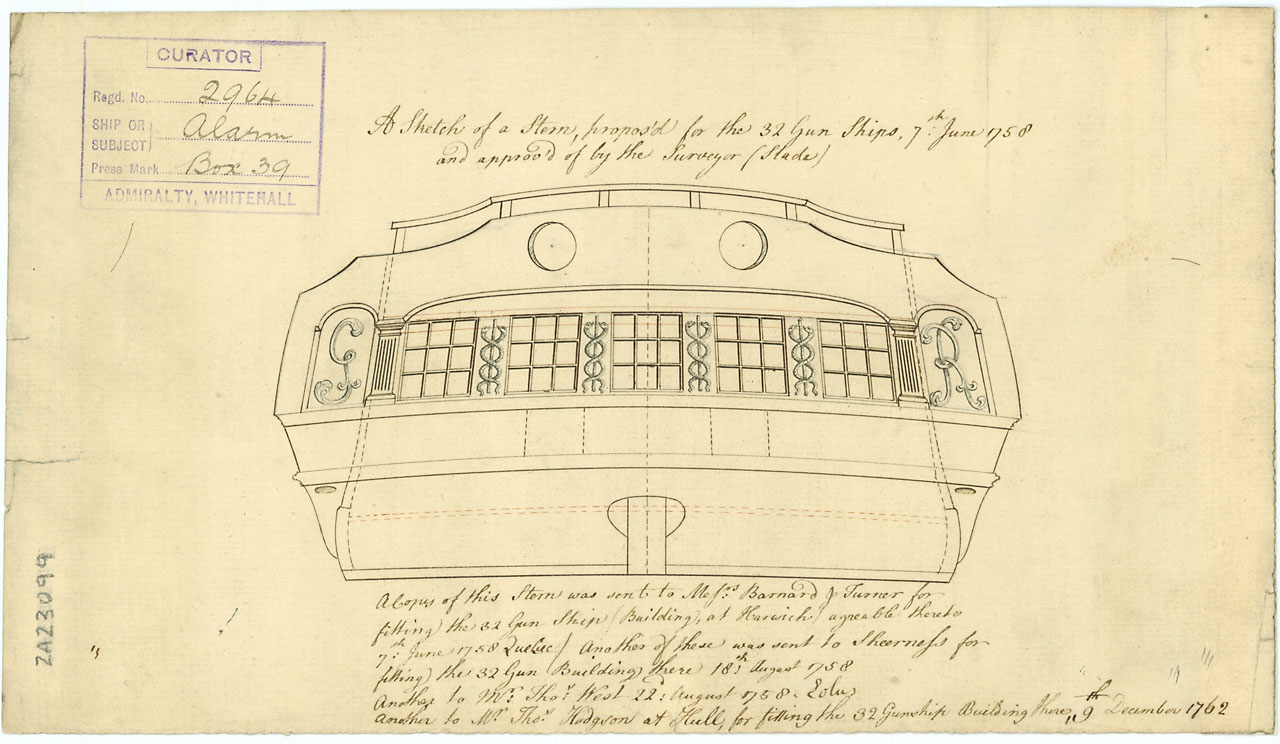
Stern plan of Niger
