= HMS Satellite (1806) =

Brig-sloop of the Royal Navy

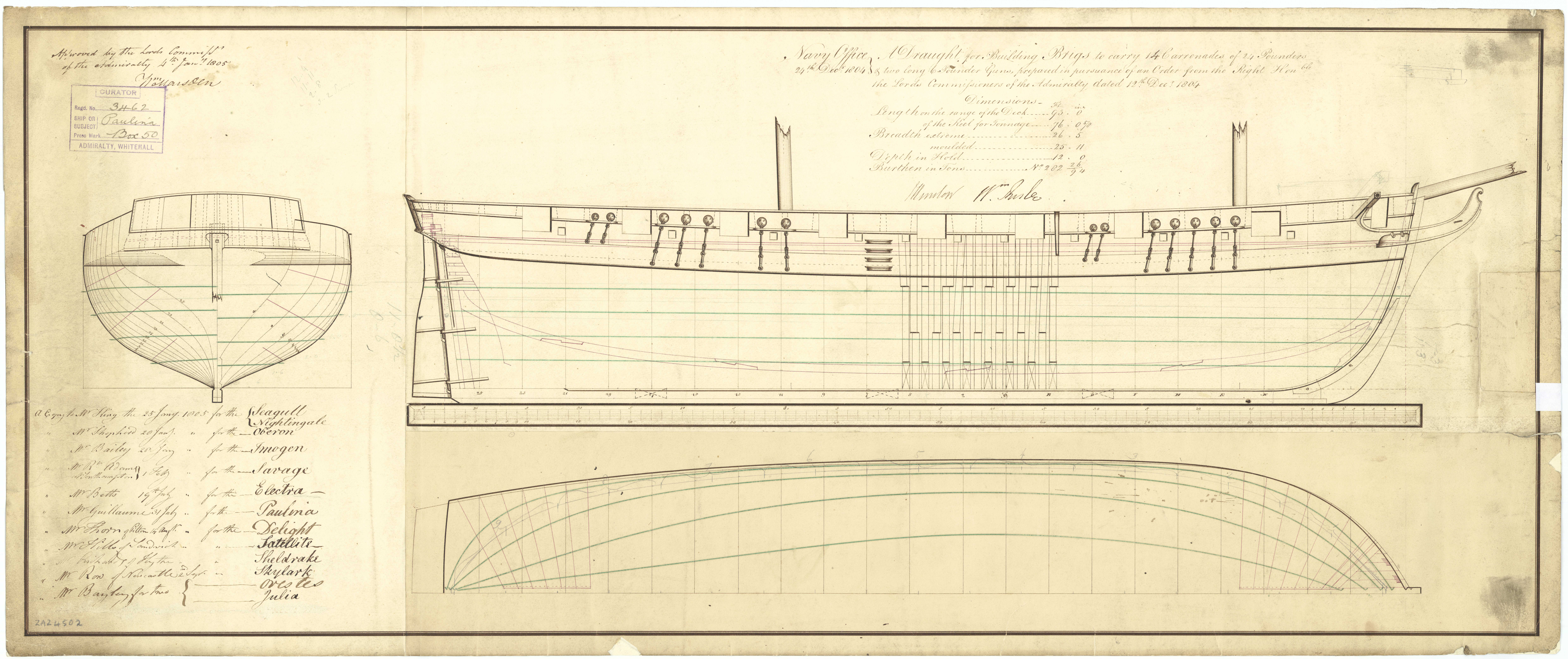
- Satellite

History

United Kingdom
- Name: HMS Satellite
- Builder: Hills Shipyard, Sandwich, Kent
- Launched: March 1806
- Fate: Foundered 19/20 December 1810

General characteristics
- Class & type: Seagull-class brig-sloop
- Tons burthen: 28861/94 (bm)
- Length: Overall: 93 ft 2 in (28.4 m); Keel: 76 ft 3 3/4 in (23.3 m)
- Beam: 26 ft 8 in (8.1 m)
- Depth of hold: 12 ft 0 in (3.7 m)
- Sail plan: Sloop
- Complement: 95
- Armament: 14 × 24-pounder carronades; 2 × 6-pounder bow guns

HMS Satellite was a 16-gun brig-sloop of the Seagull class built at the Hills shipyard, Sandwich, Kent, and launched in 1806. She foundered in December 1810 with the loss of all aboard.

== Career ==
Commander Harry Hopkins commissioned Satellite in March 1806, for the Downs. Commander Charles Payne replaced Hopkins in December.

Still, on 7 October 1807, Satellite was under Hopkins's command when she recaptured the ship Brothers. The next day, or possibly earlier on 21 August, Satellite captured the Christianhaab.

On 15 November Satellite sailed for the Leeward Islands. In 1808 Commander James Rushworth assumed command. He sailed Satellite for Jamaica on 15 December 1808. However, in September she may have been under the command of Commander Robert Evans. Commander Henry Montressor assumed command in April 1809. His replacement, in 1810, was Commander the Honourable Willoughby Bertie.

== Fate ==
Satellite, under Bertie's command, sailed from Spithead on Monday 17 December 1810 to join other ships that were cruising off La Hogue. On the Wednesday evening she was in company with HMS Vautour, but foundered during the night. In the morning Vautour picked up her empty boats and some spars that had been on deck, but found no other trace of Satellite.
