= HMS Thunder (1803) =

Bomb vessel of the Royal Navy

History

Great Britain
- Name: Dasher
- Owner: 1800:Thomas Phillips; 1803:J. Sims
- Builder: Bideford
- Launched: 1800
- Fate: Sold 1803

General characteristics
- Tons burthen: 309, or 318 (bm)
- Complement: 40
- Armament: 20 × 6-pounder guns

History

United Kingdom
- Name: HMS Thunder
- Acquired: October 1803
- Honours and awards: Naval General Service Medal (NGSM) with clasps: "Basque Roads 1809"; "Thunder 9 Octr. 1813"
- Fate: Sold 1814

General characteristics
- Tons burthen: 383 (bm)
- Length: Overall: 111 ft 3 in (33.9 m); Keel: 92 ft 10 in (28.3 m)
- Beam: 27 ft 10 in (8.5 m)
- Depth of hold: 15 ft 7 in (4.7 m)
- Complement: 67
- Armament: 8 × 24-pounder carronades + 1 × 10" + 1 × 13" mortars

HMS Thunder was an 8-gun bomb vessel of the Royal Navy, previously the mercantile Dasher. Dasher, launched at Bideford in 1800, had made two voyages as a slave ship in the triangular trade in enslaved people before the Royal Navy purchased her in 1803 and renamed her HMS Thunder. Thunder served in the Mediterranean and the Baltic; among other actions, she participated in a battle and one single-ship action, each of which resulted in her crew later qualifying for clasps to the Naval General Service Medal (1847). The Navy sold her in 1814.

== Slave ship ==
Dasher was launched at Bideford. She first appeared in Lloyd's Register (LR) in 1800 with T. Phillips, master, Phillips & Co., owners, and trade Liverpool–Africa.

Captain Thomas Phillips acquired a letter of marque on 24 October. He sailed from Liverpool on 14 November. Dasher acquired captives at the Congo River and arrived at Trinidad on 15 October 1801, where she landed some 300 captives. She arrived back at Liverpool on 24 January 1802.

LR for 1803 gave the name of Dasher's master as Hamilton, and her owner as Sime & Co. Her trade was now London–Africa.

Captain Hance Hamilton sailed from London on 1 June 1802. Because he sailed during the Peace of Amiens he did not acquire a letter of marque. Dasher arrived at Havana on 1 December 1802 and there landed 322 captives. She arrived back at London on 11 April 1803. (Note: In 1805, Captain Hamilton next served as master of the enslaving ship Caledonia.)

== Royal Navy ==
In April 1803, War with France had just resumed and the Royal Navy needed small warships to escort convoys and combat privateers. The Navy purchased Dasher in October 1803. She underwent fitting for a bomb vessel at Deptford Dockyard between 1 November 1803 and 10 February 1804. Commander George Cocks commissioned her for the Mediterranean in December 1803.

On 13 April 1805, Thunder captured Africano.

On 17 November, Thunder detained the Prussian ship Minerva, of one gun, six men and 200 tons (bm). Minerva was sailing from Barcelona to Emden with a cargo of brandy. Ten days later, Thunder detained the Swedish ship St. Jean, of two guns, eight men, and 150 tons (bm). St Jean had been sailing from Vigo to Stralsund with cocoa and fish when Thunder captured her off Malaga.

In 1806, Thunder was in the Mediterranean. On 21 January, she captured Comercium. Between 7 and 21 February, Thunder sent two Danish vessels into Gibraltar: the brig Commerce, Broadson, master, which had been sailing from Alicante to Amsterdam, and Victoriosa, Roche, master, which had been sailing from Alicante to Leghorn. Comercium and Commerce were probably the same vessel.

Next, Thunder detained Fremde Soshende, Thompson, master, which had been sailing from Malaga to Emben, and sent her into Gibraltar. This may have been Suskinders, or Trende Soskinders, which Thunder had detained on 24 March. His Majesty granted Thunder two-thirds of the value of the prize. Thunder also received two-thirds for Frau Anna Margaretha, detained on 30 April, and for Foderns Bestlutning, detained on 5 May.

On 27 April 1806, Beagle and a number of other vessels were in company with Termagant when Termagant captured the Anna Maria Carolina.

On 1 May, Thunder detained Flora.

LL reported on 6 June that Thunder had detained two Danish ships and sent them into Gibraltar. Fortune, Tasmar, master, had been coming from Galipoli and was bound for Copenhagen. Harmony, Fisher, master, had been coming from Leghorn and was bound for Stettin.

Between 16 and 11 May Thunder detained five Danish vessels that she sent into Gibraltar:

- Charlotta, Smit, master, from Sanremo to Hamburg
- Constitution?, from Sète to Stettin
- Catharina, Yenson, master, from Gallipoli to Hamburg
- Two Brothers, Krog, master, from Civitavecchia to Caen
- Adjuzor?, from Cette to Stettin

On 21 May, Thunder detained Three Ladies, Jensen, master, which had been sailing from Gallipoly to stettin, and sent her into Gibraltar. HMS Dexterous and Niger were in company with Thunder at the capture of Trende Damen (Three Ladies). Thunder and Dextereous shared in the prize money for Trende Brodre, also captured on 21 May.

Thunder also detained Catharina and Alexander on 20 and 23 May.

On 9 June, Thunder captured John Joachim and on 11 June Anna Margaretha.

Later in the year Thunder detained and sent into Gibraltar the Danish vessel Louisa, Martins, master. Louisa had been sailing from Lisbon to Barcelona.

Commander Cocks again sailed for the Mediterranean on 4 January 1807. However, by August 1807, Thunder was in the expedition to attack Copenhagen. She was part of the advanced squadron which on 11 September engaged some Danish vessels that came out of the harbour at Copenhagen to attack the batteries the British army was establishing on shore. The squadron drove of the Danes; Thunder sustained no casualties. She was among the many vessels that shared in the prize money for the capture of vessels and stores at Copenhagen on 7 September; the share of an able seaman was worth £3 8s. She was also one of some 31 vessels of the fleet that participated in the proceeds from the capture during the campaign of the merchant vessels Hans and Joachim (17 August), Die Twee Gebroaders (21 August), Aurora, Paulina, and Ceres (30&31 August), Odiford (4 September), and Benedicta (12 September).

In 1808, Commander James Caulfield replaced Cocks. On 9 June, during the Gunboat War, Thunder was one of four Royal Navy vessels escorting a convoy of 70 British merchant vessels from Malmö Roads. The other three British warships were HMS Turbulent of 12 guns, the 14-gun Piercer, and the 12-gun HMS Charger.

As the convoy was off the island of Saltholm in Øresund Strait near Copenhagen, a Dano-Norwegian force of 21 gunboats and seven mortar boats attacked the convoy.

Turbulent, which was bringing up the rear, was the first to engage and was forced to strike. Next, the Danes stationed themselves on Thunder's quarters and rear and opened fire. Thunder returned fire with her carronades and two 6-pounder guns on her stern. Eventually, the Danes withdrew with Turbulent and the 12 or 13 merchant vessels they had captured. The merchants at Lloyd's involved in the Baltic trade, as a token of appreciation for his efforts to save the convoy, gave Commander Caulfield £100 with which to purchase a piece of silver plate.

During the Anglo-Russian War (1807–1812), a Swedish fleet with HMS Centaur and Implacable engaged a Russian fleet off Hango Udd. The British warships succeeded in destroying the 74-gun Russian ship Vsevolod and the rest of the Russian fleet took shelter behind a boom in Rager Vik (Ragerswik or Rogerswick). Vice-Admiral Saumerez and his entire squadron joined the Anglo-Swedish squadron on 27 August 1807. They then blockaded the Russians for some months. During the blockade Saumarez had Thunder bombard the port for some weeks with little result. When Admiral Saumerez instructed Caulfield to withdraw he requested permission to remain a little longer. After the British and the Swedes abandoned the blockade in the face of the approaching winter, the Russian fleet was able to return to Kronstadt.

On 20 and 24 April 1809, Thunder was at the Battle of the Basque Roads. She did not participate in the original attack on 11 April, but after the French 74-gun Régulus stranded on a shoal at the entrance to the Charente, Thunder shelled her, but without success. The French eventually refloated Regulus and got her into Rochefort. In 1847, the Admiralty issued the clasp "Basque Roads 1809" to the NGSM to all surviving claimants from the battle.

In July and August, Thunder took part in the Walcheren Campaign. On 22 August, HMS Hound, Aetna, and Thunder were by the town of Doel and fired mortar shells to deter the French from throwing up a battery. Through the 30th the bomb vessels continued to shell the battery, and also enemy troops on the other side of the Scheldt. During the first week in September the British started to withdraw, ending their Walcheren campaign, having sustained heavy losses to disease and having nothing to show for their efforts.

Commander Caulfield was promoted to post captain in August 1809, with the promotion backdated to 11 April. Commander William Shepheard took command in December 1809. He sailed for Cádiz and the Mediterranean on 21 March 1810.

At the end of 1810 the French were besieging Cádiz.

Commander Watkin Owen Pell replaced Shepheard on 11 November. The French had assembled a flotilla of gun-boats to attack the town so on 23 November Thunder, Devastation, and Aetna, with a number of English and Spanish mortar and gun-boats, attacked the French flotilla at El Puerto de Santa María, between them firing some hundred shells with considerable effect.

In early 1812, HMS Stately, Druid and Thunder supported the British capture of Tarifa, near Cádiz. Thunder then returned to her station at Cádiz by Fort Catalina at the southern end of the Bay of Bulls, and protected Isla de León. The French abandoned their siege in August.

Thunder then moved to the coast of Valencia. She returned to England in September 1813.

On 9 October 1813, Thunder captured the French privateer Neptune off the Owers. Neptune, a lugger, came up on Thunder and called on the British to strike. Thunder fired a broadside (four guns), and small arms, and then came alongside. Thunder's men captured the privateer by boarding. Neptune, of Dunkirk, was two days out of La Hogue and had captured nothing. She was pierced for 18 guns, with 16 mounted. She had a complement of 68 men, of whom 65 were aboard. In the action she suffered four men killed and ten wounded, five of whom were severely wounded, one of whom later died. Thunder had only two men wounded, albeit one severely. Thunder brought Neptune into the Downs; an early report put the casualties aboard Thunder as one killed and one wounded, and the casualties aboard the privateer as 20 killed and wounded. The next report in Lloyd's List named the privateer as Neptune. In 1847, the Admiralty awarded the NGSM with clasp "Thunder 9 Octr. 1813" to all surviving claimants from the action.

== Fate ==
Thunder sold for £1,250 on 30 June 1814.
