= Caledonia (1815 ship) =

History

United Kingdom
- Name: Caledonia
- Namesake: Caledonia
- Owner: 1815:Laing & Co.; 1825:Brice & Co.
- Builder: Philip Laing, Sunderland, for own account
- Launched: 3 October 1815
- Fate: Abandoned at sea August 1832

General characteristics
- Tons burthen: 411, or 41255/94 (bm)

Caledonia was launched at Sunderland in 1815. She was initially an East Indiaman, sailing between England and Bombay under a license from the British East India Company (EIC). In 1820 and again in 1822 she transported convicts to Van Diemen's Land (Tasmania). After about 1825 she became a West Indiaman. Her crew abandoned her at sea on 28 August 1832 in a leaky state.

== Career ==
Caledonia first appeared in Lloyd's Register in the 1816 volume with Rodgers, master, Laing & Co., owner, and trade London–India.

The EIC had in 1814 lost its monopoly on the trade with India. Laing was one of many shipowners who sailed their vessels to explore the opportunity this had created.

On 20 July 1817 Caledonia, E.B. Roberts, master, sailed Caledonia for Bombay under a license from the EIC. She may have made an earlier voyage but Lloyd's Register did not publish an 1817 volume. Caledonia, Roberts, master, another voyage to Bombay, leaving on 20 November 1818. In 1822 Lloyd's Register showed Carns (or Carnes) replacing Roberts as master, however, Carns had replaced Roberts some years earlier.

1st convict voyage to Van Diemen's Land (1820): Captain Robert Carns sailed from Portsmouth on 10 July 1820. Caledonia arrived at Hobart on 17 November. She had embarked 150 male convicts and she landed all 150. Caledonia sailed on to Sydney and arrived there on 16 December.

2nd convict voyage to Van Diemen's Land (1822): Captain Carns sailed from Portsmouth on 19 June 1822. Caledonia sailed via Rio de Janeiro and arrived at Hobart on 6 November. She had again embarked 150 male convicts, but on this voyage she suffered six convict deaths en route. Caledonia sailed on to Sydney.

In 1825 Laing sold Caledonia to Brice & Co. The 1825 volume of Lloyd's Register showed Caledonia with T. Christie, master, Brice & Co. owners, and trade London–Jamaica. By 1830 her master was W. Hodnett, and her trade London–St Vincent.

On 26 March 1831 Caledonia was at Trinidad when she was caught in a gale. She lost a flat with eight hogsheads of sugar. She herself was driven on shore.

== Loss ==
Caledonia, Hodnett, master, was lost on 28 August 1832. She had been sailing from Bremen to Gaspé, Quebec, when her crew abandoned her at 49°N 6°W in a leaking state. Her crew was saved.
