= Caledonia (1797 ship) =

History

Great Britain
- Name: Caledonia
- Builder: Spain
- Launched: 1780
- Acquired: 1797 by purchase of a prize
- Fate: Last listed in 1813

General characteristics
- Tons burthen: 240, or 244, or 245, or 250 (bm)
- Complement: 1798:25; 1804:25
- Armament: 1798:16 × 4&6&18-pounder cannons + 4 swivel guns; 1800: 12 × 6&3-pounder guns + 2 × 18-pounder carronades; 1804: 10 × 12&9-pounder cannons
- Notes: Part cedar

Caledonia was launched in 1780 in Spain. She apparently was taken in prize circa 1797. She made one voyage to the Caribbean and then under a subsequent owner made five voyages as a whaler in the Southern Whale Fishery. She may then have become a transport, but though listed in the registries until 1813, does not clearly appear in ship arrival and departure data after 1805.

== Career ==
Caledonia first appeared in Lloyd's Register (LR) in 1798. She may have been a prize.

Captain Baynes Reed acquired a letter of marque on 11 September 1798. Caledonia then proceeded to sail to the Caribbean. Lloyd's List's ship arrival and departure data shows only one voyage, starting in late 1798. She sailed from London to Barbados, Barbados to Baltimore, back to Barbados, and then to London, arriving in late 1799.

Year	Master	Owner	Trade	Source
1798	B.Reed	J.Goodwin	London–Berbice	LR; repairs 1793
1800	B.Reed; J.Page	Goodwin; Bennet	London–Berbice; London–South Seas	LR

In 1800 Daniel Bennett & Son purchased Caledonia to sail her as a whaler in the Southern Whale Fishery.

1st whaling voyage (1800): Unfortunately, there is no readily available ship arrival and departure (SAD) data indicating when Caledonia, Captain John Page, left England or returned, or where she went.

2nd whaling voyage (1801–1802): Captain Page sailed from England on 6 March 1801. Caledonia was among the whalers reported to have been in Wallwich Bay in August 1801. The report stated that the whalers where "generally successful". Caledonia arrived back in England on 12 February 1802.

3rd whaling voyage (1802–1803): Captain Page sailed from England on 2 April 1802. Caledonia returned to England on 18 February 1803.

4th whaling voyage (1803–1804): Captain Page sailed from England on 4 April 1803. Caledonia returned on 8 April 1804.

5th whaling voyage (1804–1806): Captain William Simmons acquired a letter of marque on 28 June 1804. He sailed from England on 5 July. Caledonia returned on 28 April 1806.

Year	Master	Owner	Trade	Source
1806	J.Page; W.Summers	D.Bennett	London–South Seas	LR
1807	W.Summers	D.Bennett	Cork	LR

== Fate ==
Caledonia was last listed in LR and the Register of Shipping in 1813 with data unchanged from 1807. The designation of her trade as "Cork" may have signaled that she had become a government transport. A listing of ships owned by Bennett indicates that the company only owned Caledonia for the period 1800 to 1806 when she was engaged in whaling.
