= Vautour (ship) =

Numerous vessels have been named Vautour (French for "vulture"):

Privateers

- Vautour was a privateer that HMS Dryad captured after a six-hour chase. Vautour was armed with seven 4-pounder guns and two 12-pounder carronades. She was of 130 tons burthen (bm), with a crew of 78 men. She had sailed from Morlaiz on 13 October 1796 and not taken anything.
- Vautour (1797 ship) was a privateer launched in 1797 at Nantes that the British Royal Navy captured in 1800. She later became the whaler Vulture that a Spanish privateer captured in 1809.
- Vautour, was a privateer from Bordeaux commissioned in July 1797, with 64 men and 10 guns under a Captain Bolle. HMS Matilda captured Vautour on 29 March 1798.
- Vautour, was a privateer cutter from an unknown harbour, commissioned in early 1797, that HMS Impetueux captured on 8 March 1797.
- Vautour was a Spanish felucca privateer of one 9-pounder gun and 54 men that HMS Fortunee captured off Altavella (the eastern point of the island of Santo Domingo) on 10 August 1804.

Two privateers named Vautour appear in a list of 78 Corsairs commissioned in Boulogne during the period 1793-1814, with Captains Durand and Captain Orielle.

Naval vessels

- HMS Vautour (1810) an 18-gun brig-sloop, captured 1809, commissioned in the Royal Navy 1810, and sunk 1813
- Vautour was an Affronteur-class lugger launched in 1795 at Dieppe and belonging to the French Navy. HMS Boadicea captured her off Cape Finisterre.
- French destroyer Vautour was launched in the 1920s, scuttled in 1942, refloated, and then sunk in an air raid in 1944.
