= Vulture (DC Comics) =

Fictional criminal organization

Publication information
- Publisher: DC Comics
- First appearance: House of Mystery #160 (July 1966)
- Created by: Jack Miller (writer); Joe Certa (artist)

In-story information
- Type of organization: Organized crime
- Agent(s): Faceless; Marco Xavier

Vulture is an international crime cartel in the DC Comics universe. Vulture first appeared in House of Mystery #160 (July 1966), and was created by Jack Miller and Joe Certa.

== Fictional team history ==
Shortly after retiring his John Jones persona, Martian Manhunter comes into conflict with cartel operatives when he travels to the French Riviera. While in the Riviera, he investigates Marco Xavier, a playboy with supposed links to organized crime. Xavier loses control of his sports car and it plunges off a mountain road, apparently killing him. Martian Manhunter takes advantage of this accident by assuming Xavier's likeness and infiltrating the Vulture cartel. The members of Vulture become Martian Manhunter's main adversaries for fourteen issues spanning House of Mystery #160-173 (1968), the final installment in the character's original solo feature. Faceless, the leader of Vulture, later reveals himself to be Marco Xavier, asserting that he had known Martian Manhunter's secret identity the entire time and allowed his masquerade to continue to lure Manhunter into a trap.

== Membership ==
- Marco Xavier - Secretly "Faceless", the leader of Vulture.
- Abba Sulkar - A member of Vulture who transfers Martian Manhunter's memories into a reel tape, leaving his body vegetative. When facing Martian Manhunter in combat, Sulkar is killed when his weapon backfires.
- Marie Foucher - A double agent for the French Secret Service who returns Martian Manhunter's memories to his body after Sulkar removes them.

== Other characters named Vulture ==
There have been five characters named Vulture who have appeared in the DC Universe:

- Vulture: fought Doll Man in Doll Man #1 (1941)
- Vulture: fought Spy Smasher in Whiz Comics #48 (1943)
- Vulture: fought Phantom Lady in Phantom Lady #15 (1947)
- Vulture: a member of the Terrible Trio, a team of Batman foes
- In the short story "Vulture : A Tale of the Penguin", by Steve Rasnic Tem, the Penguin reinvents himself as a vigilante called Vulture after having an epiphany.
