= Caledonian (1811 ship) =

History

United Kingdom
- Name: Caledonian
- Owner: William Scott
- Builder: Barnstaple
- Launched: 1811
- Fate: Abandoned at sea 1813

General characteristics
- Tons burthen: 351, or 353 (bm)

Caledonian was launched at Barnstaple in 1811 as a West Indiaman. She first appeared in Lloyd's Register (LR) in 1811 with William Lund, master, William Scott owner, and trade Bristol–Jamaica. She made two voyages to Jamaica, and foundered at sea on 5 July 1813 homeward bound to Bristol, from Jamaica, on her second. A more complete account reports that she had suffered damage, losing her bowsprit, foremast, and main topmast. After she had parted from the rest of the convoy her crew abandoned her.
