= Caledonia (1800 ship) =

History

Great Britain
- Name: Caledonia
- Launched: 1779, Philadelphia
- Fate: Wrecked 18 September 1824

General characteristics
- Tons burthen: 279, or 282, or 291 (bm)
- Complement: 11 (1814)
- Armament: 2 guns

Caledonia was launched in Philadelphia in 1779, possibly under another name. Caledonia first appeared in British records in 1800. She traded with the Baltic and Canada. Then in 1814 United States privateers captured her twice. The first time the privateer released Caledonia; the second time the Royal Navy recaptured her. She returned to trading with Canada until she was wrecked in September 1824.

== Career ==
Caledonia first appeared in Lloyd's Register (LR) in 1800.

Year	Master	Owner	Trade	Source
1800	M'Farlane	M'Farlane	Leith–Petersburg	LR; lengthened 1783; thorough 1800
1801	M'Farlane	M'Farlane	Leith–Petersburg	LR; lengthened 1783; repairs 1784, 1792, 1798, 1799, & 1800
1805	M'Farlane; A.Grieg	M'Farlane	Leith–Petersburg	LR; lengthened 1783; repairs 1784, 1792, 1798, 1799, & 1800
1806	A.Grieg; Welsh	M'Farlane	Leith–Pictou	LR; repairs 1805
1807	Welsh; Isaacs	M'Farlane	Leith–Pictou	LR; repairs 1805
1808	Welsh; Izett	M'Farlane	Leith–Pictou	LR; repairs 1805
1811	Izett; P.Gillespie	M'Farlane	Greenock–Pictou	LR; repairs 1805
1814	P.Gillespie; M'Farline	M'Farline	Greenock–"A.Isld"	LR; repairs 1805

=== 1814 ===
On 20 April 1814 Caledonia, M'Farlane, master, was on her way from Glasgow to Nova Scotia when the United States privateer Scourge captured her at 51°00′N 22°44′W. The privateer did not retain Caledonia, which returned to Glasgow. On 2 July Caledonia sailed from Cork for Quebec. On 17 August she was "all well" at 46°40′N 41°30′W. Later, she encountered a United States privateer, of six guns and 140 men. Surprize had captured six merchantmen. She burnt two, sent two to the United States (one of them being Caledonia, M'Farlane, master), and released two.

However, HMS Nymphe recaptured Caledonian on 22 September, and sent her into Halifax, where she arrived on 26 September. The Vice admiralty court at Halifax, Nova Scotia showed Caledonia, William Macfarlane, master, as having been on her way from Greenock to Montreal with a cargo of wheat, bread, and coals. Still, Surprise had plundered Caledonia of 150 packets of her cargo.

=== Later years ===
Early in 1815 Caledonia, M'Farlane, master, arrived at Quebec from Halifax. On 20 September she arrived in the Clyde from Miramichi Bay.

Year	Master	Owner	Trade	Source
1815	M'Farlane	M'Farlane	Greenock–Pictou	LR; repairs 1805 & 1814
1816	M'Farlane; G.Jones	M'Farlane	Greenock–Pictou	LR; repairs 1805 & 1814

In 1819 Caledonia was rebuilt in Alloa and registered there.

Year	Master	Owner	Trade	Source
1821	G.Jones; G.Liddle	M'Farlane	Leith–"Mrmk"	LR; almost rebuilt 1819
1823	S.Liddle; W.Lindsay	M'Farlane	Liverpool–"Mrmk"	LR; almost rebuilt 1819

== Fate ==
Caledonia, of Alloa, Lindsay, master, was one of three vessels wrecked on 18 September 1824 in Miramichi Bay. The crews were rescued. The wrecked vessels were later condemned and sold.
