= Vulture (1798 ship) =

French ship captured by the British

History

Great Britain
- Name: Vulture
- Namesake: Vulture
- Owner: M'Kerrel
- Acquired: 1798 as a prize
- Fate: Last listed in 1804

General characteristics
- Tons burthen: 340, or 342, or 386 (bm)
- Propulsion: Sail
- Complement: 60
- Armament: 16 × 9-pounder guns + 4 × 32-pounder carronades

Vulture was a French prize that was in British hands by 1798. Captain John Toole received a letter of marque for Vulture on 23 June 1798. The size of her crew and the extent of her armament suggest that she was intended to cruise as a privateer.

Vulture first appeared in Lloyd's Register in 1799. Her master was J. Toole, and her owner was M'Kerrell. Her trade was London–Cape of Good Hope. She entered the Register of Shipping in 1800.

Lloyd's Register and the Register of Shipping both listed Vulture in 1804. Both gave her trade as London—Cape of Good Hope. Neither listed her in 1805.

It is possible that Vulture was the "Vulture of London" that the French privateer Spartiate captured and burnt in March 1799, together with Princess Amelia, of Liverpool. It was not unusual for LR to carry stale information if the owners of vessels had not notified it of events.
