= Caledonian (1797 ship) =

History

Great Britain
- Name: Caledonian
- Owner: Robert Charnock
- Builder: Barnard, Thames River
- Launched: 1797
- Fate: Burnt 29 May 1804
- Notes: This ship is often conflated with Caledonian

General characteristics
- Tons burthen: 612, or 61249/94, or 623, (bm)
- Length: 134 ft 1 in (40.9 m) (overall); 109 ft 7 in (33.4 m) (keel)
- Beam: 32 ft 5 in (9.9 m)
- Depth of hold: 14 ft 2 in (4.3 m)
- Propulsion: Sail
- Complement: 1794:30; 1798:54; 1801:60
- Armament: 1794:22 × 12&6-pounder guns + 4 swivel guns; 1798:14 × 9-pounder guns; 1801:14 × 9-pounder guns
- Notes: Three decks

Caledonian was launched on the Thames River in 1797. Between 1798 and 1803 she made two voyages to China and India as an "extra ship", i.e., under charter to the British East India Company (EIC). She sustained severe damage on the first. She burnt accidentally in 1804.

== Career ==
EIC voyage #1 (1798-1800): The EIC chartered Caledonian from Robert Charnock on 12 January 1798 at a rate of £24/ton.

Captain Stephen Hawes was sworn in to command of Caledonian on 8 February. He acquired a letter of marque on 10 March.

Hawes sailed from Portsmouth on 29 April, bound for China and Bengal. Caledonian was at Rio de Janeiro on 6 July and arrived at Whampoa Anchorage on 9 November. From there she sailed to Bengal. She crossed the First Bar on 7 January 1799, reached Malacca on 30 January and Penang on 9 February, and arrived at Diamond Harbour on 10 March. She then visited Madras, passing Saugor on 2 May, and arriving at Madras on 3 June, before returning to Calcutta on 23 August. Homeward bound, she was at Saugor on 5 December, and reached the Cape of Good Hope on 18 March.

Caledonia [sic], Captain Haweis [sic], put into the Cape the next day in great distress. Furious storms had beset her after she had left Bengal, causing her to lose her masts and causing great damage. Caledonian underwent temporary repairs and sailed from the Cape on 20 May. She reached St Helena on 11 June, and left on 17 June. She was taking on water at a rate of 12 inches per hour. After she left St Helena the rate of intake rose to 30 inches per hour. Her crew was only able to keep her afloat until she reached Plymouth on 26 August by continued pumping. She sailed for the Downs on 28 August. By 13 September she was at her moorings. Caledonian had sailed from St Helena in company with Earl Howe, Hercules, and Lord Mornington, and under escort by HMS Reliance.

EIC voyage #2 (1801-1803): Captain John Craig was sworn in to command of Caledonian on 8 July 1801. He acquired a letter of marque on 20 July.

Craig sailed from Portsmouth on 23 August, bound for Madras and Bengal. Caledonian reached Madras on 4 February 1802 and arrived at Calcutta on 5 March. Homeward bound, she was at Saugor on 21 September, reached St Helena on 19 December, and arrived at Long Reach on 8 March 1803.

== Fate ==
In 1803, Caledonian turned to sailing to the West Indies or North Atlantic. She accidentally burned on 29 May 1804.
