= Caledonia (1805 ship) =

History

United Kingdom
- Name: Caledonia
- Namesake: Caledonia
- Owner: George Geddes
- Acquired: 1805 by purchase of a Spanish prize captured in 1804
- Fate: Last mentioned 1809

General characteristics
- Tons burthen: 327, or 330 (bm)
- Complement: 1805:110; 1807:40
- Armament: 1805:20 × 12-pounder guns + 4 Swivel guns; 1807:20 × 12-pounder guns, or; 1807:4 × 12-pounder guns + 16 × 12-pounder guns "of the New Construction"

Caledonia was a Spanish vessel that the British captured in 1804 and that new owners renamed. She made two complete voyages as a slave ship in the triangular trade in enslaved people. In 1809 she disappeared from online records.

== Career ==
Caledonia entered Lloyd's Register for 1805 with Hamilton, master, Geddies (or Geddes), owner, and trade Liverpool–Africa. (Note: Earlier, Captain Hamilton had been master of the slave ship Dasher.)

Captain Hance Hamilton acquired a letter of marque on 20 September 1805. At the time he acquired the letter of marque his intention may have been to sail her as a privateer. A complement of 110 men is consistent with a privateer, which needs extra men to man prizes, but not with a merchantman or enslaving ship.

1st voyage transporting enslaved people (1805–1806): Captain Hamilton sailed from London on 16 October 1805, bound for West Central Africa and Saint Helena. Caledonia arrived at St Thomas, in the Danish West Indies, on 28 May 1806 with an estimated 280 captives. She arrived back at London on 26 October 1806.

2nd voyage transporting enslaved people (1807–1808): Captain William Miller acquired a letter of marque on 20 May 1807. He sailed from London on 1 May 1807. The Act for the abolition of the slave trade had passed Parliament in March 1807 and took effect on 1 May 1807. However, Caledonia had received clearance to sail before the deadline. Thus, when she sailed on 1 May, she did so legally. Between 1 January 1806 and 1 May 1807, 185 vessels cleared Liverpool, bound for Africa and the transport of captives to the West Indies. Thirty of these vessels departed on two voyages in that period.

Caledonia started gathering captives at Bonny on 5 August 1807. She arrived at Kingston, Jamaica, on 5 January 1808, with 344 captives. She left Kingston on 22 April 1808.

== Fate ==
Caledonia, Miller, master, arrived at Portsmouth on 27 November 1808 from Lisbon, bound for Gothenburg. Because the Slave Trade Act had ended British participation in the trans-Atlantic slave trade she could no longer continue in that trade.

The ending of the trade in enslaved people coincided for Liverpool with difficulties for its other trades. According to some merchants, in 1808 Liverpool had lost three-quarters of the trade that it had had in 1807.

Lloyd's List for 28 March 1809 reported that Caledonia, Miller, master, had arrived at Gothenburg. There is no mention of a Caledonia leaving Gothenburg in 1809–1810. That would suggest that Miller may have sold her there to owners who renamed her. Lloyd's Register and the Register of Shipping carried stale data from 1807 to 1813, though it is possible she reappeared during that time under a new name.

The shock to Liverpool's trade was short-lived. Most of the former slave ships found employment in trade between Liverpool and the West Indies, and Liverpool and South America.
