= Caledonia (1795 ship) =

History

Great Britain
- Name: Caledonia
- Namesake: Caledonia
- Owner: Fairlie, Gilmore & Co.
- Builder: Gilmore & Co.
- Launched: 1795
- Captured: Burned and exploded 29 July 1803

General characteristics
- Tons burthen: 808, 850, or 1000 (bm)
- Propulsion: Sail
- Armament: 6 × 6-pounder + 10 × 4-pounder guns
- Notes: Teak

Caledonia was launched at Calcutta in 1795. She may have served as a transport in a British expedition to Ceylon and the Moluccas in 1795. She then made three voyages to England for the British East India Company (EIC). She was trading in India in 1803 when a fire destroyed her, with great loss of life.

== Career ==
A Caledonia appears on a list of country ships that participated in expeditions to Ceylon or the Moluccas in 1795–1796.

EIC voyage #1 (1796–1797): Captain Alexander Ballantyne and Caledonia left Calcutta and were at Saugor on 25 May 1796. She reached the Cape of Good Hope on 29 September and arrived at St Helena on 28 October. She reached Lisbon on 14 January 1797 and arrived at The Downs on 8 April. She appears in supplemental pages in Lloyd's Register for 1797 with Bannatyne, master, Gilmore, owner, and trade London−India.

Caledonia was admitted to the Registry of Great Britain on 16 May 1797. On 27 July she paid £2927 3s 10d for outfitting for her return voyage.

EIC voyage #2 (1800): Captain George Thomas sailed from Bengal on 2 January 1800. Caledonia reached St Helena on 19 March and arrived at Long Reach on 2 June. The cost, paid on 22 September, for her fitting for her return voyage was £3140 18s 5d.

EIC voyage #3 (1801–1802): Captain Thomas was at Calcutta on 18 June 1801. Caledonia left Bengal on 11 September, reached the Cape on 20 December and St Helena on 3 February 1802, and arrived at Greenhithe on 17 April. Fitting out for the return voyage this time cost £5540 10s, and was paid on 8 July. She sailed on 4 August for Calcutta and returned to coastal trade in India.

== Loss ==
On 18 May 1803 Caledonia, George Thomas, master, left Balasore Roads on a voyage to Bombay. On 29 July a fire broke out and she exploded before all could leave her. Eighty-six people died out of 157, including the First, Second, Third, and Fourth Officers. Next day her longboat landed 57 survivors at Versova, Mumbai.
