= HMS Vautour =

Brig of the Royal Navy

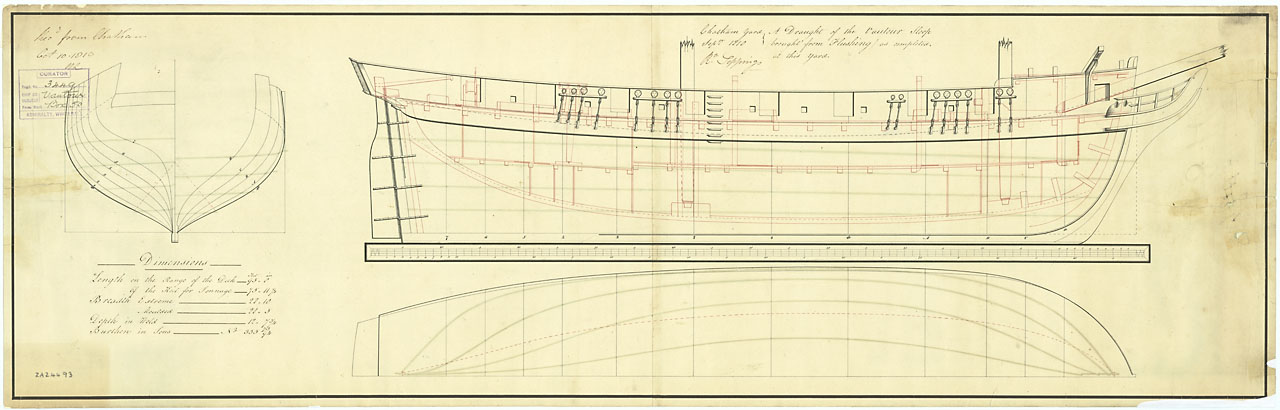
- Vautour

History

United Kingdom
- Name: HMS Vautour
- Namesake: Vulture
- Acquired: 1809
- Commissioned: 1810
- Fate: foundered 1813

General characteristics
- Class & type: French Sylphe-class brig
- Displacement: 190/374 tons (French)
- Tons burthen: 33673/94 (bm)
- Length: 95 ft 0 in (29.0 m) (gundeck); 75 ft 11 1/4 in (23.1 m) (keel)
- Beam: 28 ft 10 in (8.8 m)
- Depth of hold: 12 ft 7 1/4 in (3.8 m) (keel)
- Propulsion: Sails
- Sail plan: Brig
- Complement: French:98; HMS:105 men
- Armament: French:14 × 24-pounder carronades + 2 × 8-pounder chase guns; HMS:14 × 24-pounder carronades + 2 × 6-pounder chase guns

HMS Vautour was 16-gun brig-sloop of the British Royal Navy. The navy captured her from the French on the stocks in 1809 and commissioned her in 1810. She foundered in October 1813.

== Origin and capture ==
Vautour was a Sylphe-class brig of 16 guns, one of 32 built between 1804 and 1814. The French Navy had ordered her construction in 1806 and her keel was laid down in October 1806.

Vautour was taken on the stocks on 16 August 1809, at Flushing (Vlissingen's dock-yard slip) during the unsuccessful British Walcheren expedition of August 1809 to seal the River Scheldt and Antwerp. Vautour was described in 1812 as "the only remaining trophy in our Navy of the expedition to the Scheldt."

== Career ==
Vautour arrived at Chatham for finishing on 20 November 1809. She was hauled onto Chatham slipway on 4 May 1810, and relaunched on 15 September 1810. Because there was already a Vulture in service, the Navy retained her French name.

Commander John Parish commissioned Vautour in July 1810. Commander Paul Lawless replaced Parish in 1811. Lawless had distinguished himself at the Scheldt as captain of the bomb vessel Aetna. (Note: Admiral sir George Cockburn in his dispatches after the campaign, noted that "the constant and correct Fire from the Ætna, Captain Lawless, particularly drew my Attention.")

On 19 December 1810, Vautour was cruising off La Hogue, Northern France, in the company of HMS Satellite, in strong winds. Satellite foundered during the night. In the morning, Vautour picked up her empty boats and some deck spars, but no other vestige was found.

Between 1811 and 1812, Vautour was based at Portsmouth. From there, she patrolled and escorted convoys in the Channel.

At some point in early 1812, the Reverend George Cuthbert sued Lawless for "a gross assault". Once the facts of the case had been established, Cuthbert did not pursue the case further, even though the circumstances of the case would not admit of a proffered apology.

On 5 September 1812, Vautour sailed from Portsmouth chasing the 16-gun sloop HMS Pylades, which had left three days earlier, to request she land her army money cargo at Lisbon, instead of Porto. Vautour arrived at Porto on the 13th, but too late, so turned back, arriving at Lisbon on the 17th. Vautour had a crew of 105; Captain Lawless (who was a 1st Lieutenant); 2nd Lieutenant Soper, 4 midshipmen; Her armament was fourteen 24-pound guns & 2 long nines; from Journal of army Lieutenant Larpent. Larpent wrote, "Vautour", 'a fast-sailing brig' was also known as 'Vauteur' (her French name) and 'Vulture' (a sloop called HMS Vulture was already in the Navy). Larpent shared the Captain's windowless 10 by 12 foot cabin; the Admiralty paid him £21 for the transport "of Deputy Judge Advocate Larpent to Lisbon".

On 14 November 1812, Vautour recaptured the brig Margaret. (Note: A first-class share of the prize money was worth £51 2s 8d; a sixth-class share, that of an ordinary seaman, was worth £4 4s 2¼d.)

The same day, Vautour and Tyrian, Lieutenant Augustus Baldwin, recaptured the brig Peace.

On 22 January 1813, Vautour sailed for the Leeward Islands, with the West India convoy. There she joined the Jamaica station.

== Fate ==
Vautour disappeared in the English Channel in October 1813 with the loss of Lawless and his entire crew. Her loss is possibly related to the wreck that month of an unknown sloop at Portreath on the coast of Cornwall. The Admiralty did not officially pay her off until August 1814. The Archeological Data Service has a website on the loss that allocates the location to Pentreath.
