= HMS Vulture =

Several vessels of the Royal Navy have been named HMS Vulture, including:

- HMS Vulture (1648), a Royalist ketch captured by the Parliamentary forces in 1648.
- HMS Vulture (1656), a Dunkirk privateer captured in 1656, and sold in 1663.
- HMS Vulture (1673), a sloop of 1673, sold 1686.
- HMS Vulture (1690), a fireship of 1690, lost to the French in 1708.
- HMS Vulture (1744), a 10/14-gun sloop of 1744, sold in 1761.
- HMS Vulture (1763), a 14-gun ship-sloop of 1763, taken to pieces in 1771.
- HMS Vulture (1776), a 14/16-gun ship-sloop of the Swan class that served in the American Revolution; transported Benedict Arnold as he escaped following the failed attempt to surrender West Point to British forces; sold in 1802.
- HMS Vulture (1803) was launched as Warrior in 1801 by Simon Temple, South Shields. The Admiralty purchased her in 1803 and converted her to a 16-gun sloop that it disposed of in 1814. She returned to mercantile service as Warrior and made one voyage east of the Cape of Good Hope. She was last listed in 1820.
- HMS Vulture (1843), a steam paddle frigate launched in 1843 that served in the Crimean War and was sold in 1866.
- HMS Vulture (1869), a screw gunboat launched in 1869, disposed of 1885.
- HMS Vulture (1898), a torpedo boat destroyer launched in 1898, broken up in 1919.
- HMS Vulture (shore establishment) was for RNAS St Merryn, a Naval Air Station in Cornwall, England, from 1940 until 1953, with the associated bombing and gunnery range being HMS Vulture II.

== See also ==
- HMS Vautour (1810), ("Vautour" being French for vulture), an 18-gun brig-sloop, captured in the Netherlands in 1809, commissioned in 1810, and foundered 1813; sometimes called Vulture, despite the ship above being active.
