= Brigades nautiques et fluviales =

Specialized units of the French Gendarmerie

Nautical Brigade Fluvial Brigade
- Brigade nautique Brigade fluviale
- Country: France
- Branch: National Gendarmerie
- Role: Judicial police and intelligence in underwater environments Search for missing persons Rescue operations Control of professional or recreational underwater activities Support to military authorities in this environment

The Nautical Brigades (BN) and Fluvial Brigades (BF) are specialized units of the French Gendarmerie focused on judicial investigations underwater and the control of fluvial transport. These units also carry out other missions related to this environment (fishing control, pollution control, intelligence, rescue, military missions, etc.).

== Organization ==
In 2016, the Coastal Nautical Brigades (BNC), distributed along the French coastline, the 4 Inland Nautical Brigades (BNI), and the 14 Fluvial Gendarmerie Brigades (BFG), coordinated by the Command of the Gendarmerie for Navigable Waterways (CGVN)., are under the Departmental Gendarmerie Groups (GGD). Their judicial competency zones are distributed by Defense and Security Zone.

- Defense and Security Zone North (Lille)
  - BNC Calais (Pas-de-Calais): intervention vessel Eulimène. The territorial brigade of Saint Valéry also has a vessel.
  - BFG Douai (Nord): established on 1 August 2016 (transferred from La Bassée)
  - BFG Noyon (Oise): established on 15 July 2005, its judicial competency zone also extends to the Seine-et-Marne department
- Defense and Security Zone West (Rennes)
  - BFG Rouen (Seine-Maritime): established on 1 September 2012 (transferred from Le Grand-Quevilly), its judicial competency zone also extends to the Yvelines department
  - BNC of Ouistreham (Calvados): 1 new 11.6-meter vessel capable of carrying 6 people and 2 lightweight boats capable of carrying 3 to 6 people.
  - BNC of Granville (Manche): established on 15 August 2004, equipped with the 8.7-meter semi-rigid boat Roche Noire with two 250-horsepower engines, received in 2018.
  - BNC Lézardrieux (Côtes-d'Armor): established on 15 August 2004, with 3 rigid coastal surveillance boats
  - BNC Roscoff (Finistère): established on 1 August 2006.
  - BNC La Forêt-Fouesnant (Finistère): established on 1 July 2010 (transferred from Bénodet), vessel Méaban
  - Coastal Nautical Brigade of Quiberon (Morbihan): established on 15 August 2004, with 3 vessel pilots, 6 specialized in underwater environments (divers), equipped with an 11.60-meter semi-rigid Plexaure and a 7-meter, 180-horsepower deployable White Shark boat
  - BNC of Pornic (Loire-Atlantique): established on 15 August 2004
  - BFG Nantes (Loire-Atlantique): established on 15 August 2004
  - BFG Saint-Gilles-Croix-de-Vie (Vendée): established on 15 August 2004
  - BFG Saint-Pierre-des-Corps (Indre-et-Loire): established on 15 August 2004
- Defense and Security Zone South-West (Bordeaux)
  - BNC of Arcachon (Gironde): its judicial competency zone also extends to the departments of Lot, Aveyron, Tarn-et-Garonne, Tarn, Gers, Haute-Garonne, Ariège, and Hautes-Pyrénées.
  - CBN (nautical brigade community) La Rochelle (Charente-Maritime)
    - BNC La Rochelle: 5 non-commissioned officers
    - BNC La Tremblade: established on 1 March 2019 (transferred from Royan)
- Defense and Security Zone South (Marseille)
  - BNC Saint-Cyprien (Pyrénées-Orientales): established on 15 August 2004
  - BNC Leucate (Aude): established on 1 April 2005
  - BNC Marseillan (Hérault):
  - BNC Le Grau-du-Roi (Gard): established on 15 August 2004.
  - Fluvial and Nautical Brigade of Port-Saint-Louis-du-Rhône (Bouches-du-Rhône): established on 1 September 2011.
  - BNC Martigues (Bouches-du-Rhône): established on 15 August 2004.
  - BNC Roquebrune-les-Issambres (Var): established on 15 August 2004
  - BNC Le Lavandou (Var): established on 1 June 2008
  - BNC of Antibes (Alpes-Maritimes): established on 15 August 2004
  - BNI Embrun (Hautes-Alpes): established on 15 August 2004
  - BNC Ajaccio (Corse-du-Sud): established on 15 August 2004, based at the BAN Aspretto since 2015, with 7 military personnel (divers) and 3 judicial police officers, equipped with a 7.20-meter Kelt White Shark vessel with 200 horsepower, a 7.50-meter semi-rigid Zodiac with 200 horsepower (surveillance of Cavallo Island during July and August), 1 light liaison vehicle, 1 4x4 vehicle for launching and rough terrain, 1 van for diving equipment.
  - BNC Bastia (Haute-Corse): established on 15 August 2004
- Defense and Security Zone South-East (Lyon)
  - BFG Villefranche-sur-Saône (Rhône): established on 1 January 2007
  - BFG Valence (Drôme): established on 1 January 2007
  - BNI Aix-les-Bains (Savoie): established on 1 March 2007.
  - BNI Évian-les-Bains (Haute-Savoie): established on 1 December 1991 (4 non-commissioned officers and 2 auxiliary gendarmes at its creation)
- Defense and Security Zone East (Strasbourg)
  - BFG Metz (Moselle): established on 1 August 2012, its 8 gendarmes are equipped with 2 vessels based at the New Port of Metz. The Voies navigables de France (VNF) vessel Le Vigilant is made available in autumn and winter, as it is better suited to low temperatures.
  - BFG Gambsheim (Bas-Rhin): established in 1974. Part of the Franco-German fluvial gendarmerie company on the Rhine, created on 9 March 2012. This company then comprised 26 French gendarmes and 29 German police officers, equipped with 3 French vessels, 2 German vessels, and a sonar.
  - BFG Strasbourg (Bas-Rhin): established on 1 October 1968
  - BFG Vogelgrun (Haut-Rhin): established in 1969, its eight-gendarme staff doubled with the arrival of 8 German police officers from Breisach during the creation of the Franco-German fluvial gendarmerie company on the Rhine; upon its officialization on 6 July 2022, it comprised 27 French gendarmes and 30 German police officers.
  - BNI Dienville (Aube): established on 1 October 2006, notably operates on the Lakes of Orient
  - BFG Saint-Jean-de-Losne (Côte-d'Or): established on 15 January 2007, its judicial competency zone also extends to the Rhône department
- Defense and Security Zone Paris
  - BFG Conflans-Sainte-Honorine (Yvelines): established in September 1976, its judicial competency zone also extends to the departments of Eure, Seine-Maritime, Aube, Loiret, Eure-et-Loir, Yonne, and Oise.
- National Nautical Instruction Center of the Gendarmerie (CNING): located at the Petit-Arsenal barracks in Antibes (Alpes-Maritimes)
- Overseas Gendarmerie Command (CGOM)
  - COMGEND Martinique: BNC Le Marin
  - COMGEND Guadeloupe:
    - BNC Pointe-à-Pitre: established in 1990, vessel Karukéra
    - BNC Gourbeyre: established on 1 January 2004
  - COMGEND French Guiana: BNC Matoury, established on 1 June 2009 (transferred from Cayenne)
  - COMGEND Réunion: BNC Le Port, established on 1 February 2001
  - COMGEND Mayotte: BNC Pamandzi, established on 1 March 2004
  - COMGEND New Caledonia: BNC Nouméa, established on 1 June 1995
  - COMGEND French Polynesia: BNC Papeete, established in 2001

=== Dissolved Nautical Brigades ===
- Nautical Brigade of Basse-Terre (Guadeloupe): established in 1991 in Sainte-Claude and dissolved on 1 January 2004, with the corresponding creation of Gourbeyre.
- Nautical Brigade of Saint-Pol-de-Léon (Finistère): established on 15 August 2004 and dissolved on 1 August 2006, with the corresponding creation of Roscoff.
- Nautical Brigade of Hyères (Var): established on 15 August 2004 and dissolved on 1 June 2008, with the corresponding creation of Le Lavandou.
- Nautical Brigade of La Trinité (Martinique): dissolved on 1 October 2008.
- Nautical Brigade of Cayenne (French Guiana): established in 1992 and dissolved on 1 June 2009, with the corresponding creation of Matoury.
- Nautical Brigade of Bénodet (Finistère): dissolved on 1 July 2010, with the corresponding creation of La Forêt-Fouesnant.
- Nautical Brigade of Fécamp (Seine-Maritime): established on 15 August 2004 and dissolved on 1 April 2010.
- Nautical Brigade of Saint-François (Guadeloupe): established on 1 November 2005 and dissolved on 1 March 2011.
- Fluvial Brigade of Grand-Quevilly: dissolved on 1 September 2012, with the corresponding creation of Rouen.
- Nautical Brigade of Fort-de-France (Martinique): dissolved in 2014 (decree of 10 October 2014).
- Nautical Brigade of Crozon (Finistère): established in 1991 and dissolved in 2014 (decree of 12 August 2014), with the corresponding creation of Telgruc-sur-Mer.
- Nautical Brigade of Saint-Valery-sur-Somme (Somme): established on 1 January 2007 and dissolved on 1 August 2015, replaced by a nautical unit (BTA Saint-Valery-sur-Somme) equipped with a boat and a “launch vehicle.”
- Nautical Brigade of Hendaye (Pyrénées-Atlantiques): established on 1 October 2007 and dissolved on 1 August 2015.
- Nautical Brigade of La Ciotat (Bouches-du-Rhône): established on 1 August 2004 and dissolved on 1 August 2015.
- Fluvial Brigade of La Bassée (Nord): established on 15 February 2007 and dissolved on 1 August 2016, with the corresponding creation of Douai.
- Coastal Nautical Brigade of Agde (Hérault): established on 15 August 2004 and dissolved on 1 May 2017.
- Coastal Nautical Brigade of Telgruc-sur-Mer: established on 15 August 2004 and dissolved on 1 August 2018.

== Specializations ==
=== Vessel Pilot: PEG2 ===
Departmental gendarmes who pilot these nautical assets, particularly the vessels, must hold the PEG2 (Second-Degree Gendarmerie Vessel Pilot) certification.

This certification is issued by the National Maritime Gendarmerie Instruction Center (CNIGM) in Toulon (Var) after a 5-week course including theoretical and practical sea training. The PEG2 holder receives a diploma and may wear the PEG2 insignia.

=== Divers ===
The gendarmerie includes two types of divers: underwater investigators from the nautical and fluvial brigades and intervention divers from the GIGN. The core role of underwater investigators is underwater judicial investigation. They are trained at the National Nautical Instruction Center of the Gendarmerie (CNING) in Antibes, where they obtain a “Diplôme de Technicien Investigation Subaquatique” (DTIS)

Missions

- Search for evidence in judicial investigations (discovery of bodies, weapons, ammunition, explosives, stolen objects, vehicles, drugs, etc.)
- Search for missing persons
- Rescue of endangered or disaster-affected individuals following natural catastrophes
- Security and protection of sites to ensure the safety of property and persons
- Control of professional or recreational underwater activities (underwater construction sites, dive clubs, fisheries policing, etc.)
- Intelligence for civilian or military authorities

Structure

The gendarmerie’s investigator divers are assigned to the following nautical and fluvial brigades (2017):

- Zone Marseille: BN of Antibes, BN of Ajaccio, BN of Martigues, BN of Roquebrune, BN of Agde, and BN of St-Cyprien
- Zone Bordeaux: BN of Arcachon, BN of La Rochelle, BN of Royan
- Zone Rennes: BN of Saint-Gilles-Croix-de-Vie, BF of Nantes, BN of Quiberon, BF of Saint-Pierre-des-Corps, BN of Lézardrieux, BN of Ouistreham, BF of Rouen
- Zone Paris: BF of Conflans-Sainte-Honorine
- Zone Lille: BN of Calais, BF of Noyon
- Zone Metz: BF of Gambsheim, BF of Strasbourg, BF of Vogelgrun, BN of Dienville
- Zone Lyon: BN of Aix-les-Bains, BF of Valence
- CGOM (Overseas): BN of Marin (Martinique), BN of Pointe-à-Pitre (Guadeloupe), BN of Matoury (French Guiana), BN of Port (Réunion), BN of Pamandzi (Mayotte), BN of Nouméa (COMGEND New Caledonia), BN of Papeete (COMGEND French Polynesia)
- CEGN: National Nautical Instruction Center of the Gendarmerie (CNING) in Antibes

== Nautical assets ==
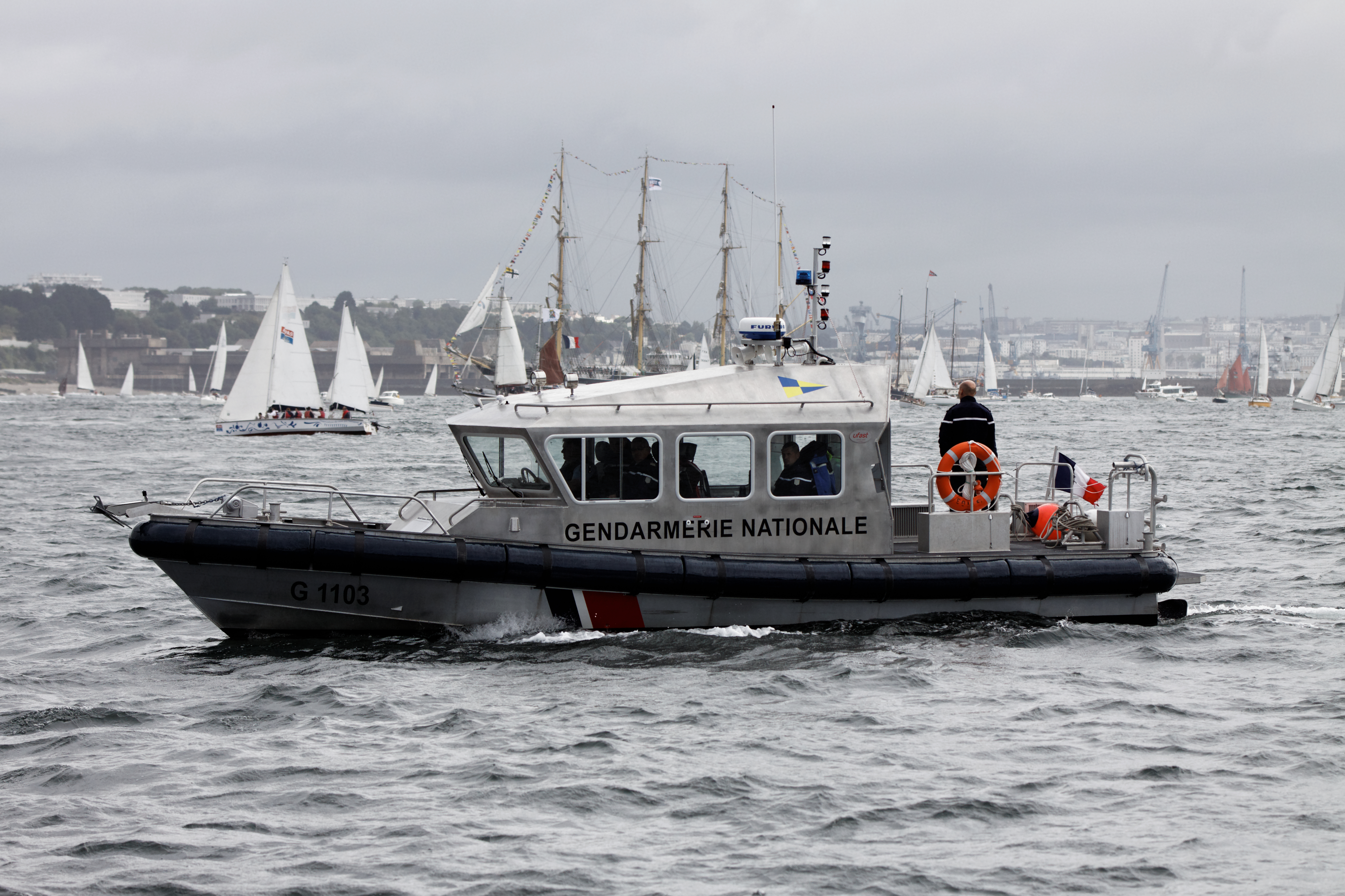
The vessel G1103 Amathée of the Roscoff nautical brigade during the grand parade of Tonnerres de Brest 2012.

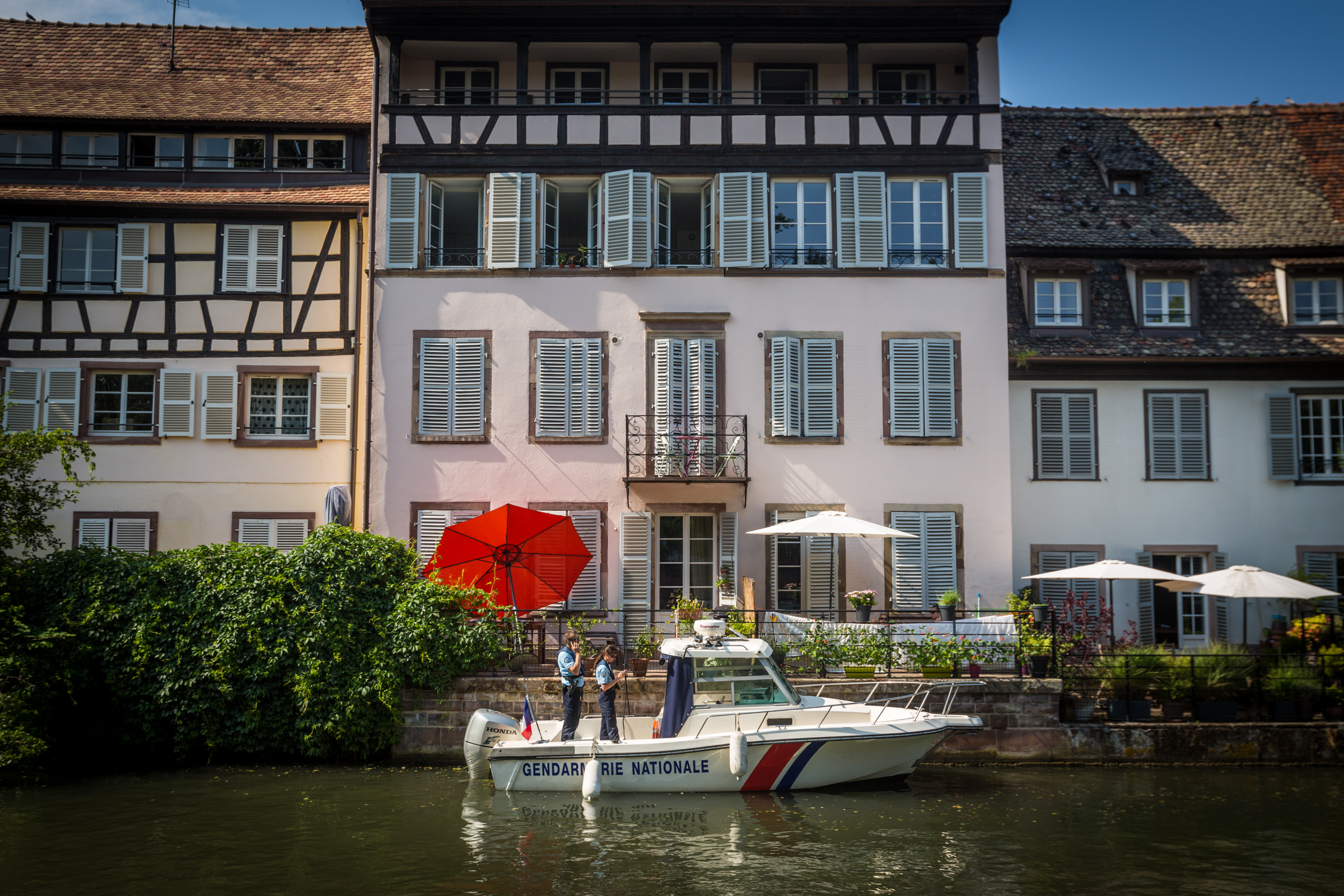
Vessel of the Strasbourg fluvial brigade in 2015.

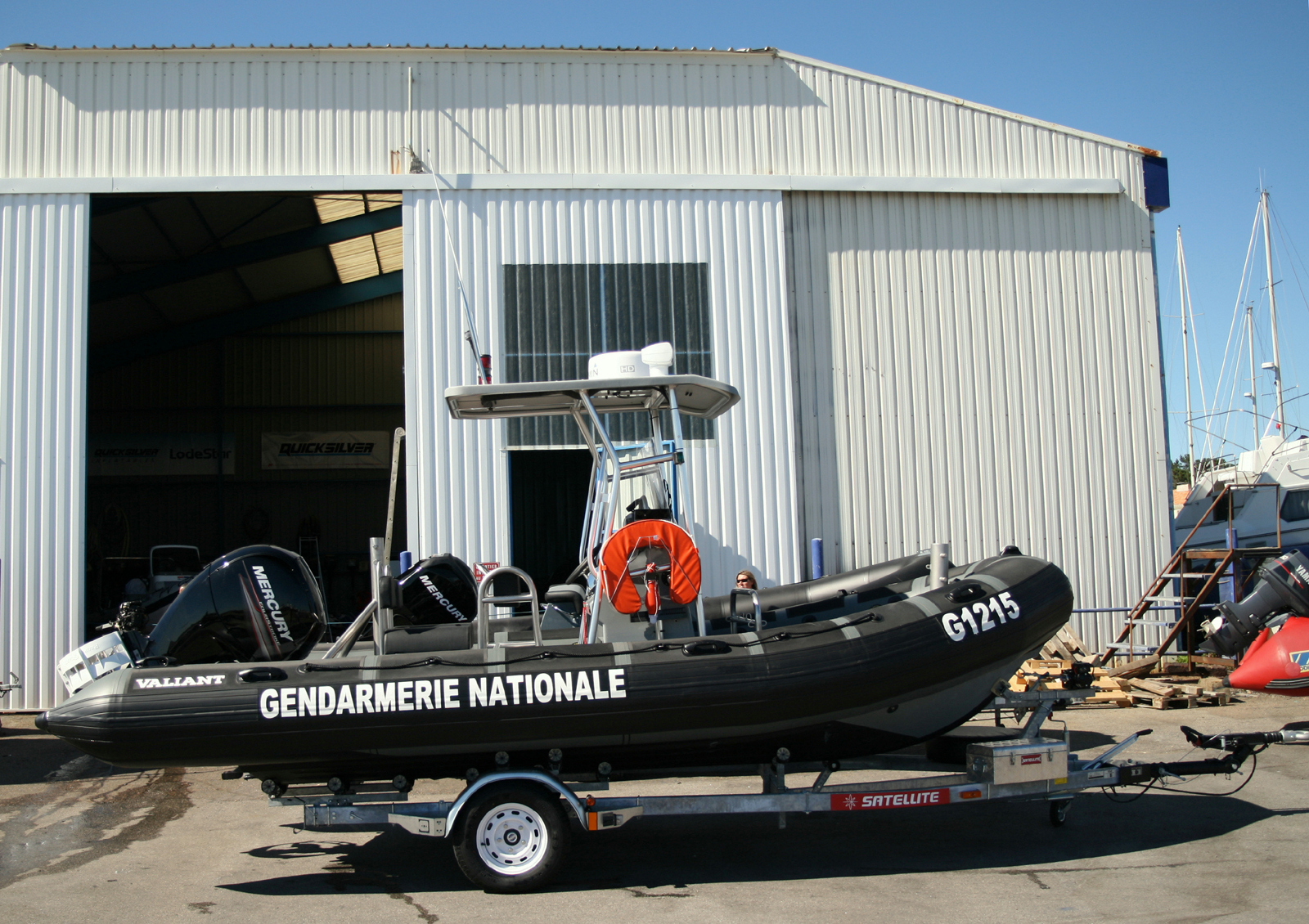
Semi-rigid on its trailer at Port Bourgenay in 2012

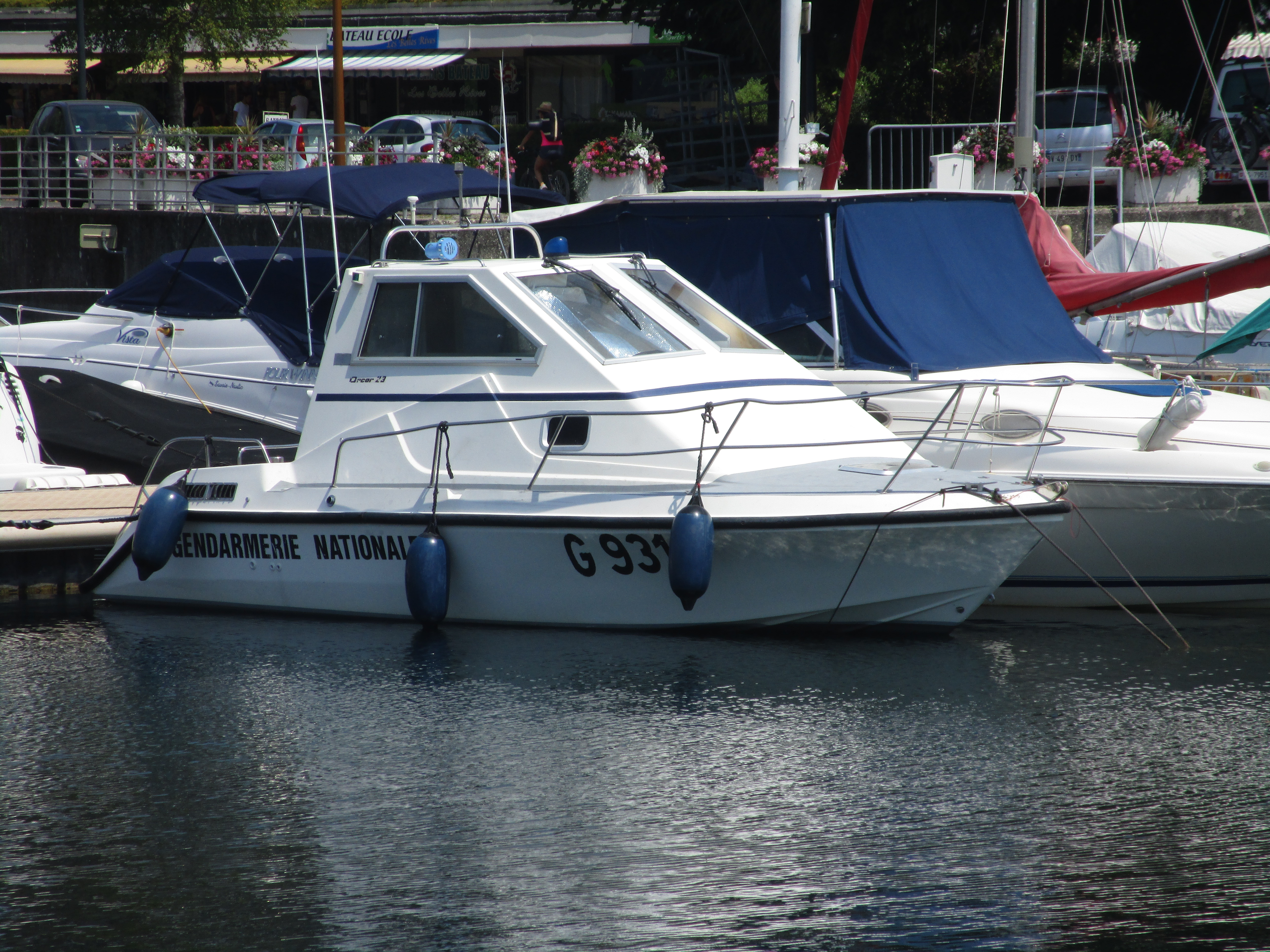
G 931 Orcor 23 at Aix-les-Bains in 2015

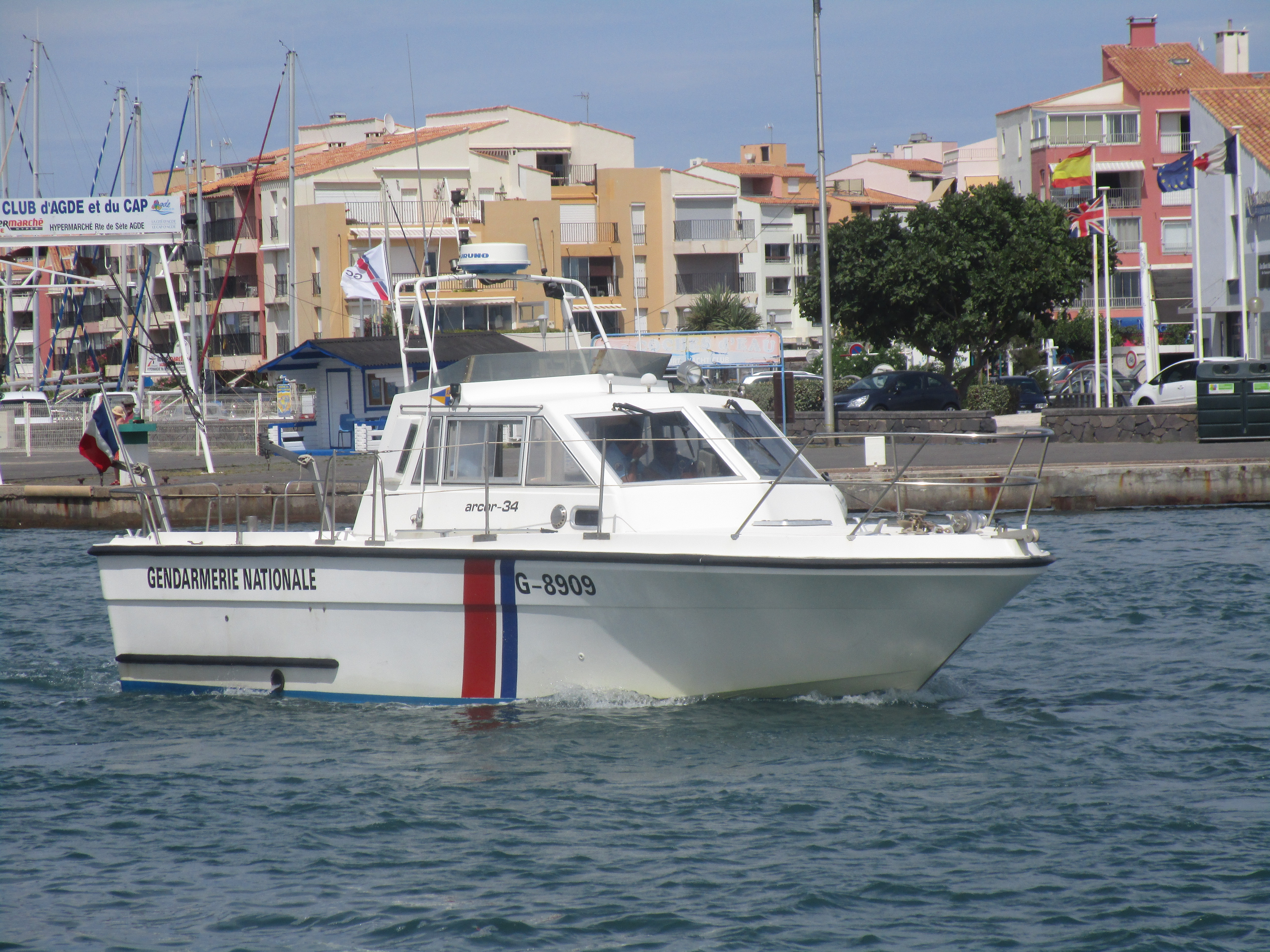
The vessel G 8909 at Cap d'Agde in 2015

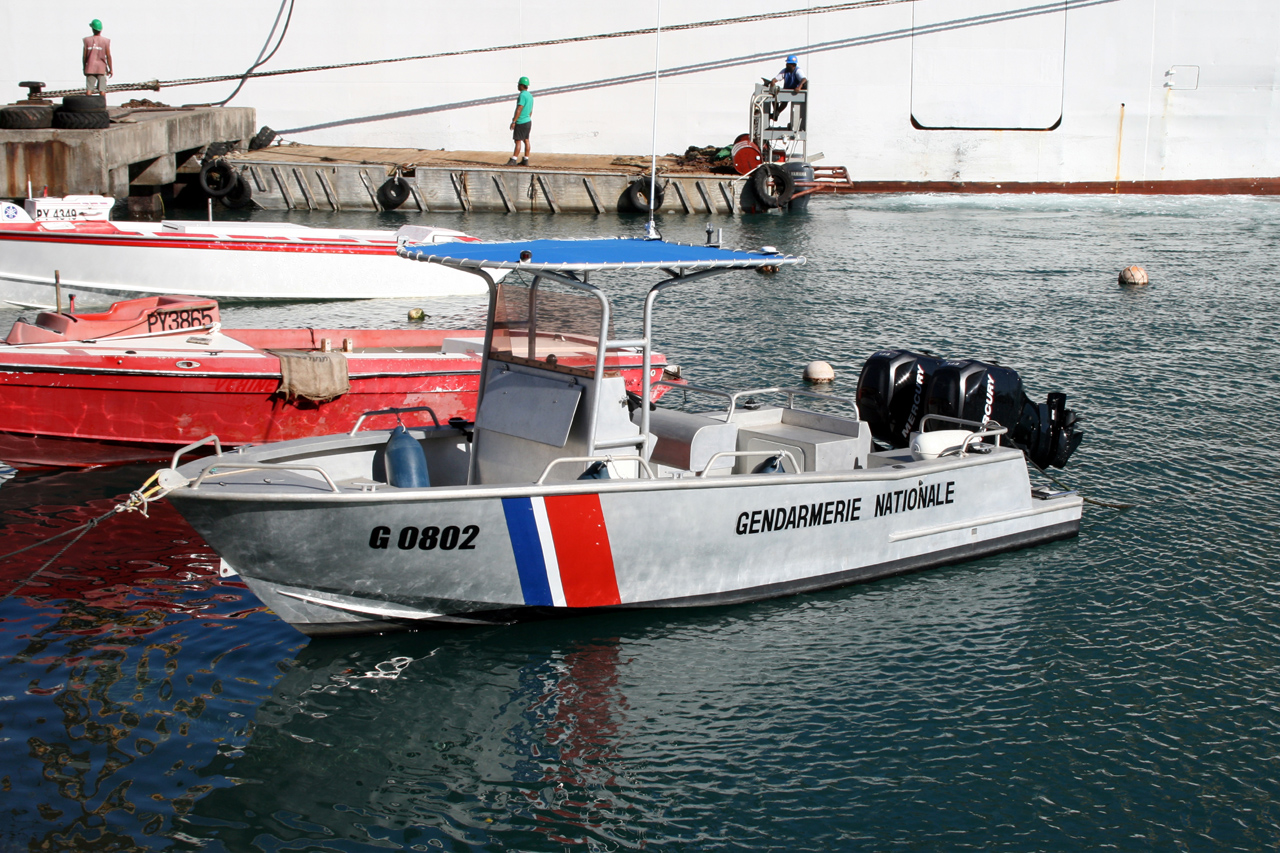
G 0802 at Hakahau on the island of Ua Pou in 2009.

== See also ==
- French Gendarmerie
- French Maritime Gendarmerie
- River Police
