= Hakamaii =

Hakamai'i
- Associated commune of Ua-Pou
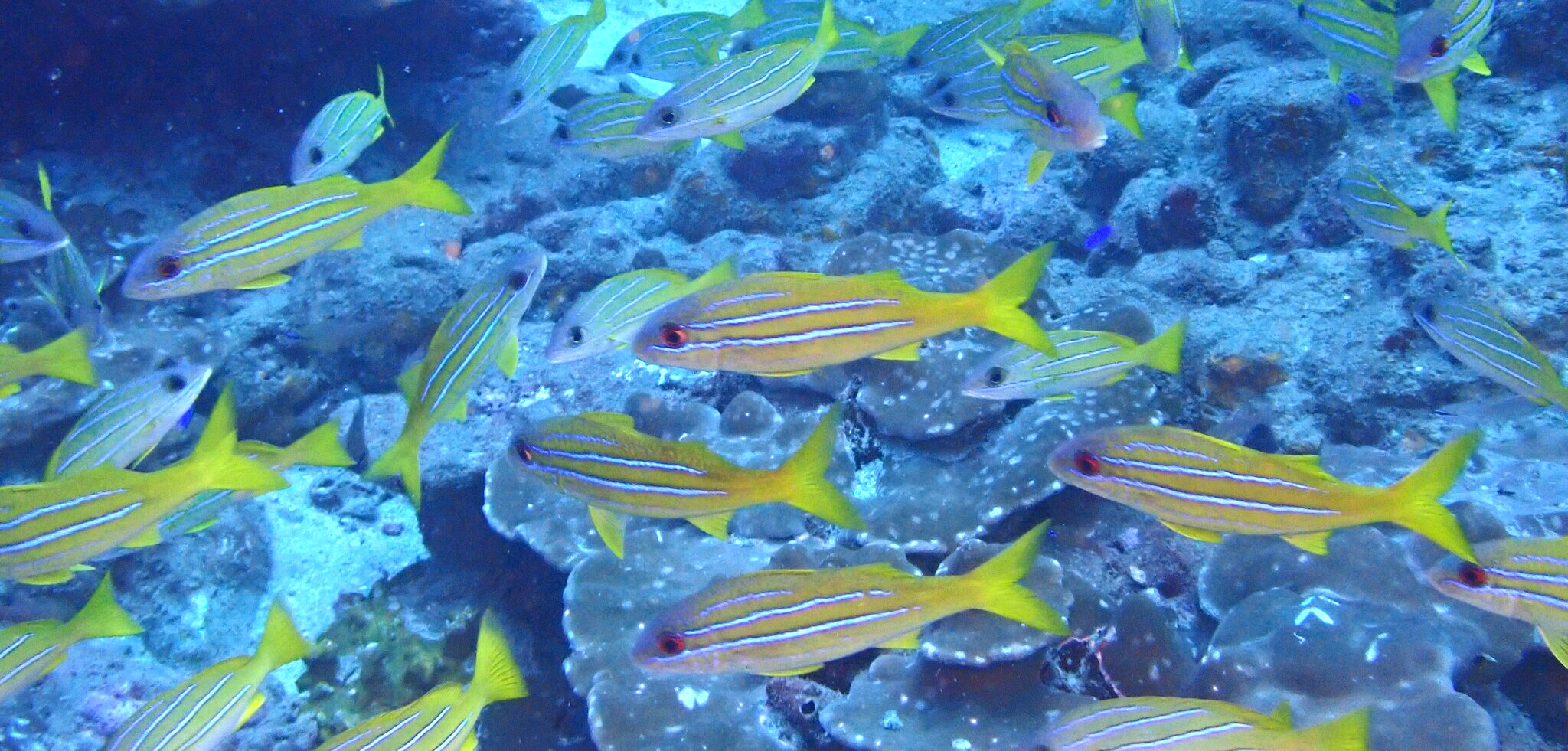
- Fish near the commune

- Location within Marquesas Islands
- Location of Hakamai'i
- Coordinates: 9°24′52″S 140°6′44″W
- Country: France
- Overseas collectivity: French Polynesia
- Subdivision: Marquesas Islands
- Commune: Ua-Pou
- Area^{1}: 0.144 km^{2} (0.056 sq mi)
- Population (2022): 514
  - Density: 3,570/km^{2} (9,240/sq mi)
- Time zone: UTC−10:00
- ^{1} French Land Register data, which excludes lakes, ponds, glaciers > 1 km^{2} (0.386 sq mi or 247 acres) and river estuaries.

Hakamai'i is an associated commune on the island of Ua Pou in the Marquesas Islands group of French Polynesia. It is approximately 90 minutes by road from the island's capital of Hakahau. Its population was 514 at the 2022 census.

The village was previously inhabited by the Ahutai tribe. It has a primary school, the Ecole primaire Hakamai'i. Secondary students must attend boarding school elsewhere.
