= Anahō =

Coordinates: 9.360°S 140.038°W

Anahō is a bay of Nuka Hiva, Marquesas Islands. The bay and beach are situated near Hakahau.
