= Tekao =

Mountain in French Polynesia

Coordinates: 8°50′39″S 140°09′57″W

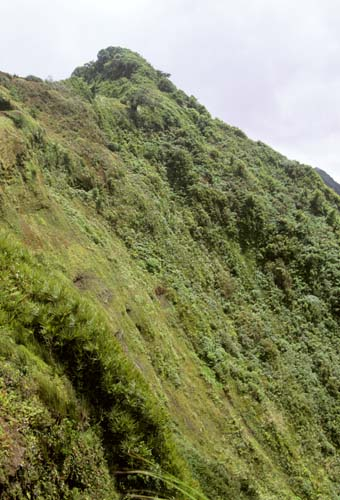
Mont Tekao.

Tekao is the highest peak on the island of Nuku Hiva, in the Marquesas Islands. It is located in the northwest corner of the island, along the border of the Tōviʻi plateau, in the traditional province of Te Iʻi.

It rises to an elevation of 1,224 metres (4,016 ft) above sea level.
