= Joseph Kaiha =

European politician

Joseph Kaiha is a politician of the Marquesas Islands in French Polynesia. He has been the mayor of the island of Ua Pou since 2001. He was Minister of Culture from 2008 to 2009, and founder and first president of the Marquesas Island Community (Codim).

== Political career ==
Kaiha became mayor of Ua Pou in 2001. He was Minister of Culture of the French Polynesian government from 2008 to 2009. In this role, in June 2008 he inaugurated a major exhibition on Polynesian Arts and Divinities at the Musée du quai Branly in Paris. While in Paris Kaiha met UNESCO officials to discuss the possibility of granting World Heritage status to the mountainous Marquesan islands of Nuku Hiva and Hiva Oa. In October 2008 Kaiha proposed formal recognition of Polynesian artisans as professionals. He said the government should facilitate supply of raw materials to recognized artisans at reasonable prices so their finished products would be affordable.

Kaiha and Benoît Kautai, mayor of the island of Nuku Hiva, worked together to establish the Marquesas Island Community (Codim). Kaiha was president of the organization. Codim was formally established on 29 November 2010, and in November 2012 was ready to present its development plan. The plan addressed the key sectors of fishing, agriculture and tourism, discussed inter-island transport and stressed sustainable development, including creation of a protected marine area. In a 2013 interview Kaiha noted that there had been little real economic development among the 9,000 people of the Marquesas islands for thirty years. Nuclear testing had brought revenue, but that had ended. There was some limited potential for fruit production. About 10,000 tourists visited annually, and the goal was to increase that to 20,000.

In January 2014 a government delegation visited Ua Pou with three Chinese engineers to look into the possibility of building a new airfield. Kaiha said that at best the government had been undiplomatic, and at worst was trying to sway the coming municipal elections. During a visit of Polynesian Health Minister Béatrice Chansin in July 2014 Kaiha made a request for a new helicopter to serve the Marquesas for medical emergencies. The helicopter formerly based at Nuka Hiva had left at the end of the 2000s for financial and mechanical reasons.
