= Ua Pou =

Island in French Polynesia

Ua-Pou
- Commune
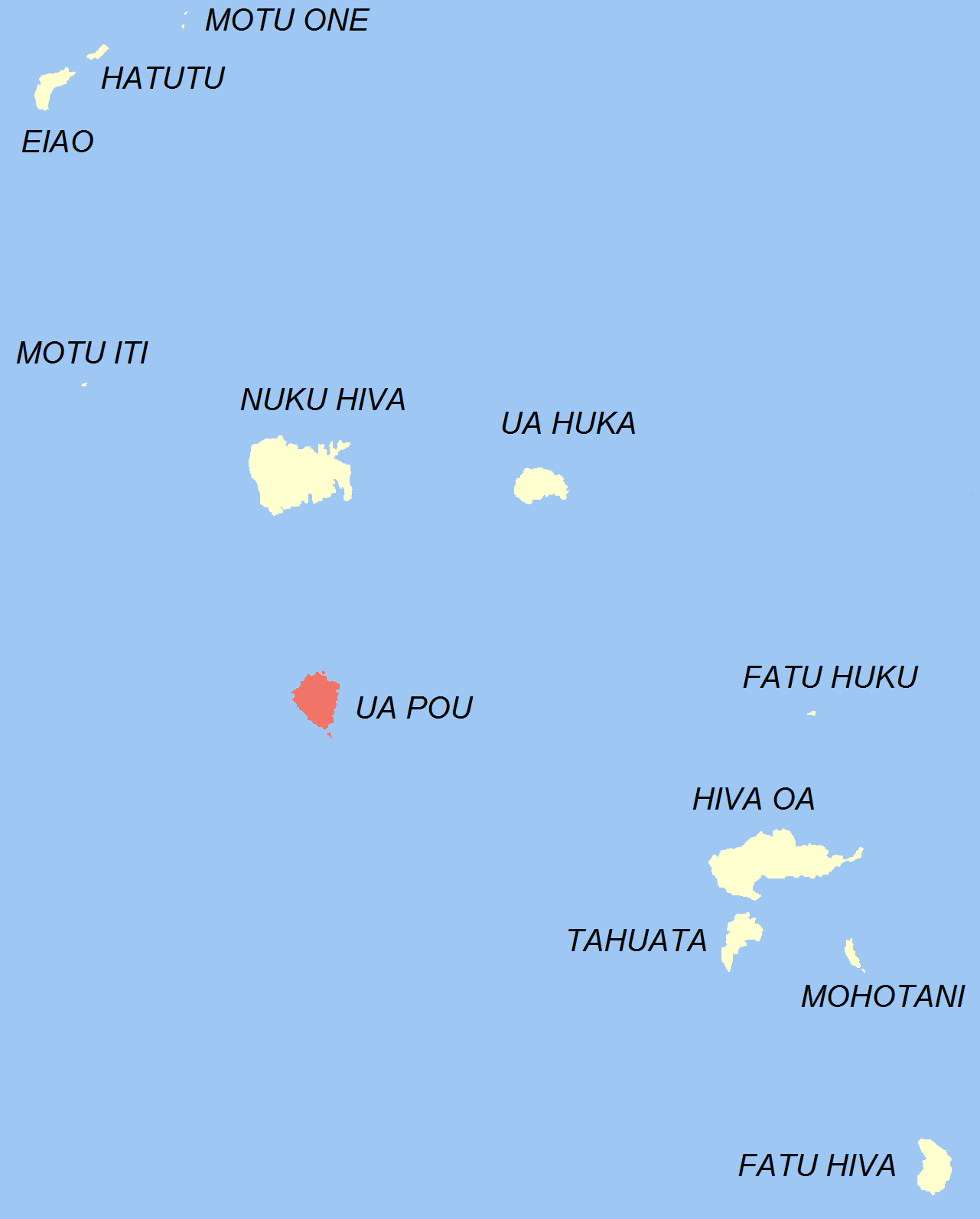
- Location of the commune (in red) within the Marquesas Islands
- Location of Ua-Pou
- Coordinates: 9°24′00″S 140°04′00″W
- Country: France
- Overseas collectivity: French Polynesia
- Subdivision: Marquesas Islands

Government
  - Mayor (2020–2026): Joseph Kaiha
- Area^{1}: 105.6 km^{2} (40.8 sq mi)
- Highest elevation: 1,230 m (4,040 ft)
- Lowest elevation: 0 m (0 ft)
- Population (2022): 2,168
  - Density: 20.53/km^{2} (53.17/sq mi)
- Time zone: UTC−09:30
- INSEE/Postal code: 98757 /98745
- ^{1} French Land Register data, which excludes lakes, ponds, glaciers > 1 km^{2} (0.386 sq mi or 247 acres) and river estuaries.

Ua Pou (French: Ua Pou, North Marquesan: ’uapou) is the third-largest of the Marquesas Islands, in French Polynesia, an overseas territory of France in the Pacific Ocean.

== History ==
=== Pre-European history ===
Ua Pou is the only major island that was unified under a single monarch prior to the arrival of European explorers.

Prior to the island's unification, reportedly about 1585, there is evidence that the tribes of Ua Pou were sometimes united in war with the tribes of Te I'i on Nuku Hiva against those of Tai Pi Vai. Despite the fact that tribes from both the eastern and western halves of Ua Pou were often united in war against each other, however, it appears that such differences among them were not considered when members of tribes from either side of the island sought refuge among the tribes of Te I'i on Nuku Hiva.

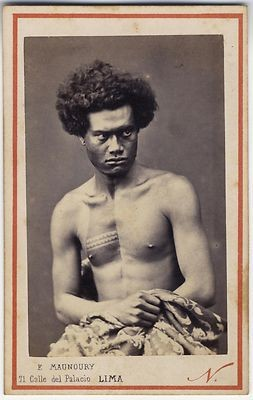
Hitoro, Chief of the Ua Pu Island (1863)

The early Polynesian settlers of Ua Pou lived under rock overhangs, as excavations from 1982 onwards at the Anapua rock shelter, not far from the village of Hakatao in the south of the island, have shown. Their main diet was fish.

In the following centuries, independent tribal principalities arose in the valley incisions, still recognizable today by the location of the villages. At first, only coastal regions with access to the important food source, the sea, were settled; with increasing population density, settlements grew in the valleys. Little research has been done on the tribal society of Ua Pous; the German ethnologist Karl von den Steinen did pioneering work there in 1897/98.

Important tribal principalities were located in the Hakamoui and Paumea valleys, whose architectural legacies are still visible today. The islanders built their houses and ritual structures on stone platforms (paepae) up to 3 m high. The actual houses were made of perishable materials and had a steep gabled roof made of palm fronds, the back panel of which reached the ground. The façade was open and the roof was supported by profusely decorated and beautifully carved poles.

=== Exploration and Colonization ===
In 1791, American Joseph Ingraham passed through the northwest group of the Marquesas on his way to China, but without setting foot there. He gave the island of Ua Pou, visible in the distance, the name "Adam" or "Adams Island" after Vice President John Adams.

It was also formerly known as Trevenen Island. The name Ua Pou means "two pillars" and perfectly reflects its orography. It has also been written as Ua Pu, Hua Pu and Ropo.

It is considered that the real European explorer was the French circumnavigator Étienne Marchand (1755-1793), who arrived shortly after, on June 20, 1791, anchored with his ship Solide first in Vaiehu Bay, on the west coast, and then off Hakahau. He remained off the island for a total of three days, but contacts with the inhabitants during the brief excursions ashore were limited. Marchand named the island "Île Marchand," after his own surname.

The arrival of the U.S. whaling ship Tuscan from Nantucket on March 4, 1835, was a prelude to other encounters with whalers, adventurers, and shady traders in the following years, who brought firearms and alcohol to the tribes.

The year of Ua Pou's final submission to French rule is considered to be 1880, when Rear Admiral Abel Bergasse Dupetit-Thouars (adopted son of Abel Aubert Du Petit-Thouars), forcibly removed the last resistance. The Marquesas then became a French colony.

== Geography ==
It is located about 50 km (30 mi.) south of Nuku Hiva, in the northern Marquesas. The center of the island is characterized by four high basalt pillars that reach high above the surrounding mountains. The highest of these pillars, Mount Oave (Mont Oave), reaches to 1,230 m (4,040 ft) above sea level and is the highest elevation in the Marquesas.

The island covers an area of 105.6 square kilometres (41 square miles), and is located just northwest of the small island of Motu Oa. The largest settlement is Hakahau, on Hakahau Bay, on the northeast coast.

=== Demographics ===
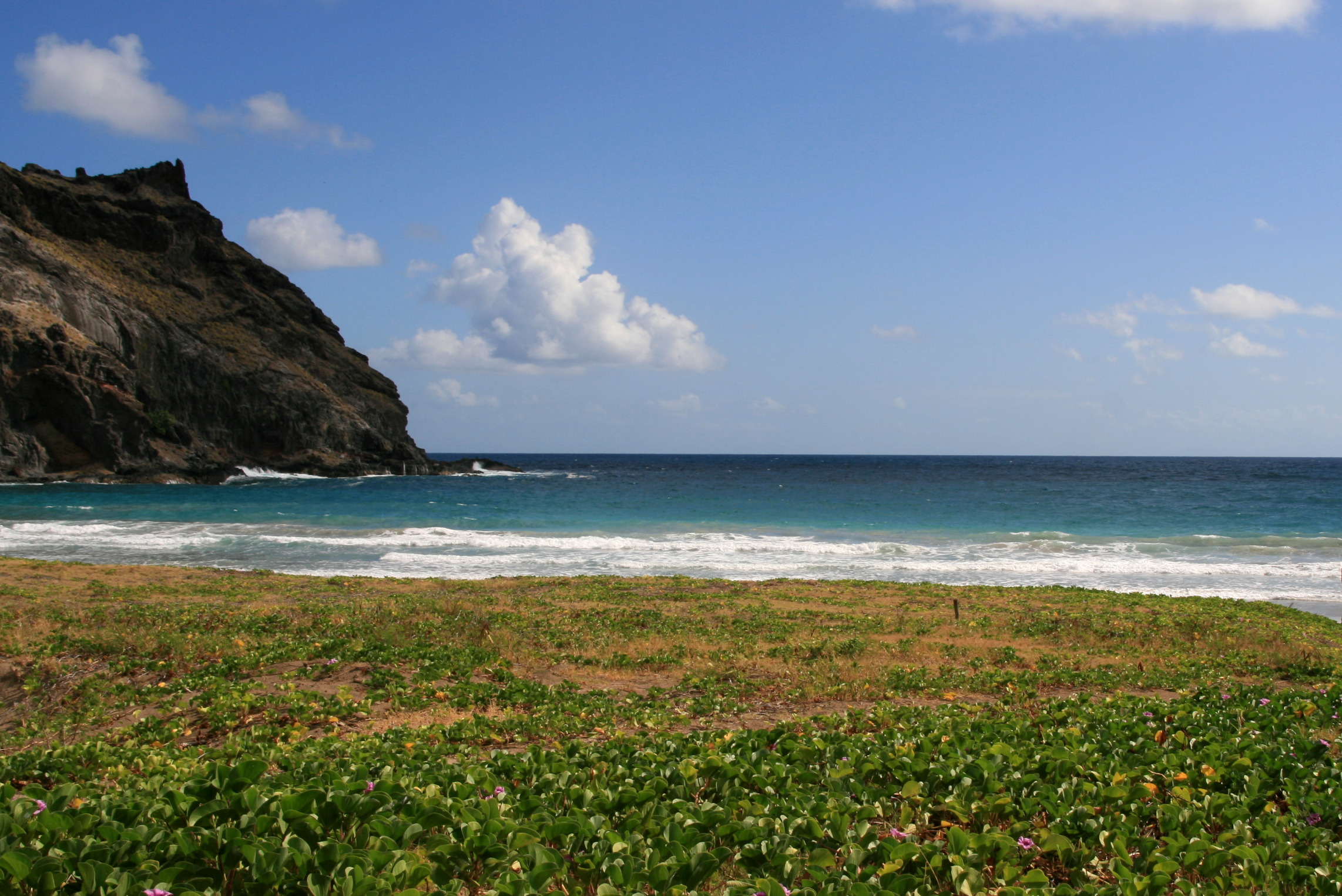
Beach of Anahoa Bay

With 2,200 inhabitants in the 2002 census, and 2,168 at the 2022 census, it is the most densely populated island of the archipelago. The main village is Hakahau located in the northwest of the island with the main port and close to the airport. The population is known for the innate artistic qualities of artisans, sculptors and tattoo artists, as well as traditional singers and dancers. The Matava'a festival is held periodically and is an important center of Marquesan culture.

Historical population
| Year | Pop. | ±% |
|---|---|---|
| 2002 | 2,110 | — |
| 2007 | 2,157 | +2.2% |
| 2012 | 2,173 | +0.7% |
| 2017 | 2,213 | +1.8% |
| 2022 | 2,168 | −2.0% |

=== Geology ===
Geologically, Ua Pou is part of the Marquesas linear volcanic chain, which formed from a hot spot on the Pacific Plate and is moving WNW at a rate of 103–118 mm per year. The island's igneous rocks are between 2.54 and 4.86 million years old.

=== Climate ===
Ua Pou is located in the Earth's tropical belt. The climate varies from hot and humid in the coastal areas to cool and humid in the mountainous regions, with frequent and abundant rainfall.

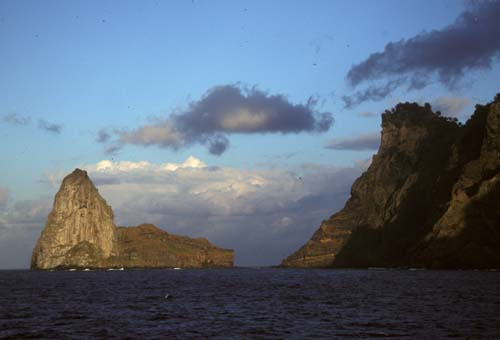
Ua Pou's South Coast

=== Flora ===
The flora of Ua Pou is relatively poor in species compared to the other large islands of the Marquesas (Nuku Hiva and Hiva Oa). Only 90 native species - 2 of them endemic - and 71 exotic species have been recorded. However, this may be related to the insufficient number of specimens collected so far; the steep and inaccessible peaks have prevented any systematic botanical study for the time being.

The formation of the flora is strongly influenced by the trade winds, which contribute to lower temperatures and provide abundant rainfall. The coastal zones of the incised valleys have exuberant vegetation up to medium altitudes, although centuries of human settlement and intensive cultivation have considerably reduced the number of native plants, giving preponderance to anthropochorous plants.

In the intermediate regions, arid or semi-arid native plant communities predominate. In the high summits, low-growing shrubs predominate, mostly metrosideros. In the north, shaded from the wind and rain of the mountains, there are larger arid zones.

=== Fauna ===
The fauna of the Marquesas Islands is species-poor and is limited to land and sea birds, insects, butterflies and spiders. The island is named after a genus of canopy spider (Linyphiidae) that is endemic to Ua Pou. There are no animals that are dangerous to humans. Nono flies, a type of black fly, which appear in the interior, are usually extremely unpleasant.

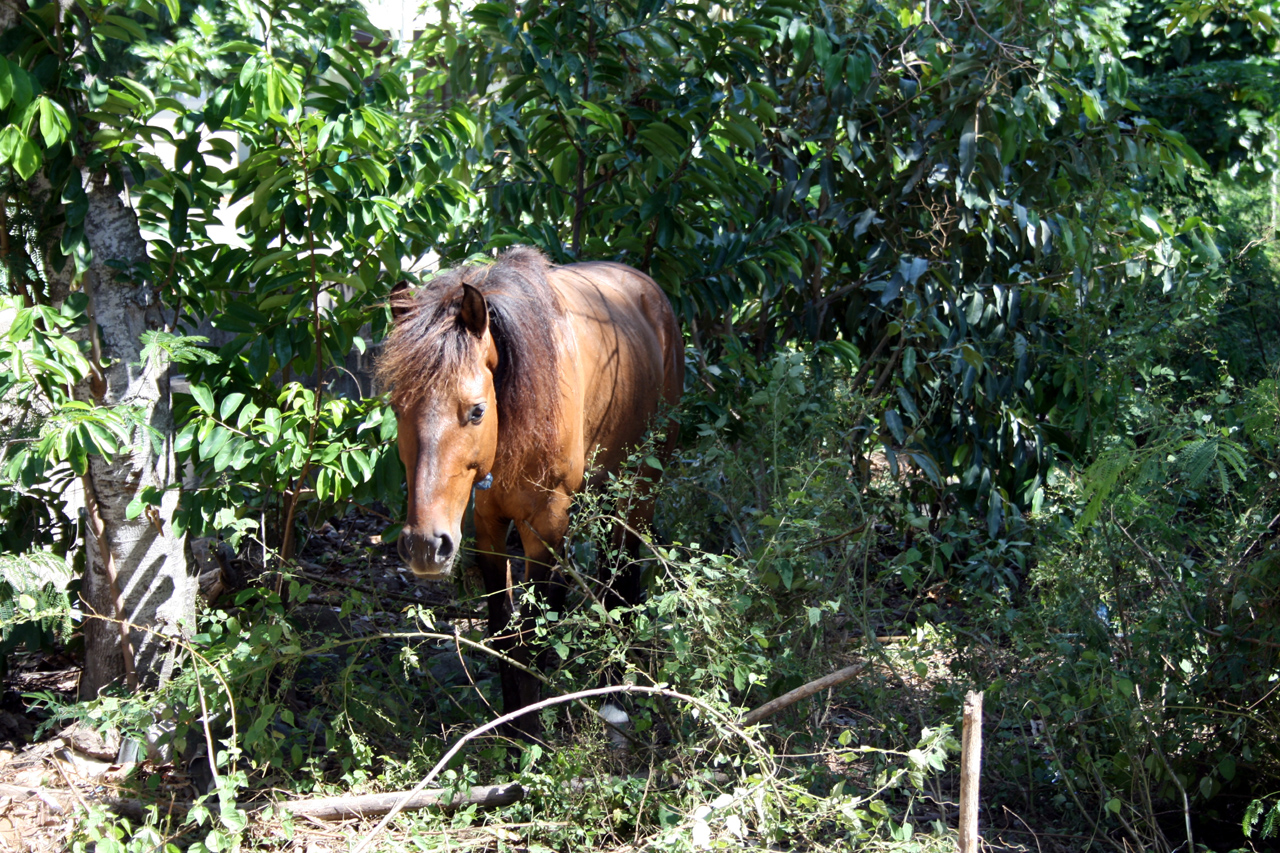
Horse at Ua Pou

In a bay separated from Hakahau by a peninsula (Anahoa Beach), green sea turtles (Chelonia mydas) lay their eggs. This area is not yet protected and it is the most attractive bathing beach on the island.

== Administration ==
Administratively Ua Pou forms the commune (municipality) of Ua-Pou, part of the administrative subdivision of the Marquesas Islands. This commune consists solely of the island of Ua Pou and its offshore rocks. Ua-Pou consists of the following associated communes:

- Hakahau
- Hakamaii

The administrative center of the commune is the settlement of Hakahau, located within the associated commune of Hakahau, on the north-eastern shore of the island.

== Infrastructure ==
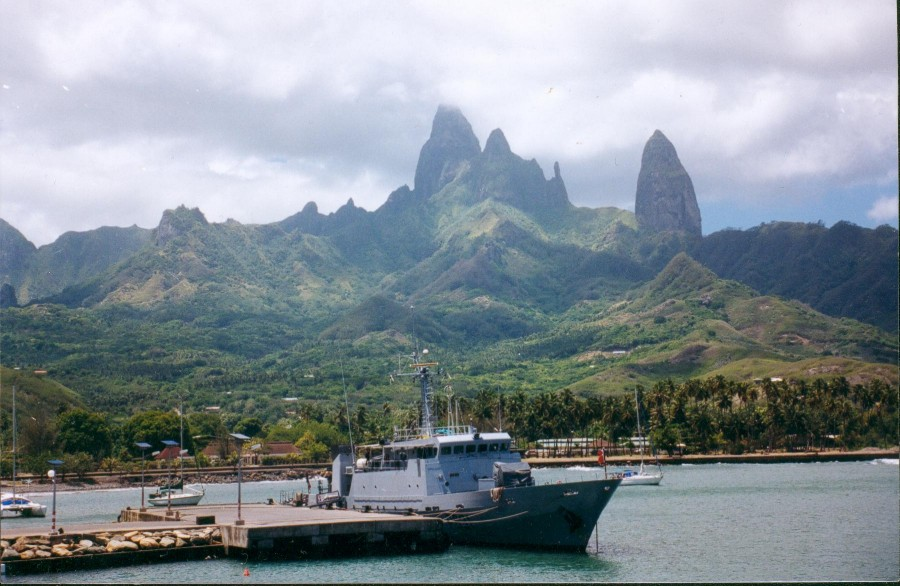
A French Navy ship on the Island

In the main village of Hakahau there is a medical center, a national Gendarmerie station, the port authority, some small stores, a bank, a post office (with satellite telephone), some private pensions, restaurants, a Catholic and a Protestant church, a school with preschool (école maternelle et primaire) and a secondary school (collège).

The villages are connected by roads that are only partially paved. Some settlements can only be reached by boat (since 2001).

In the north of the island, between the villages of Hakahau and Hakahetau, there is an 830 m-long (2,720 ft) paved airstrip (IATA airport code: UAP) in a narrow valley. The airfield is considered difficult because the runway starts right at the edge of the sea, ends in front of a mountain and has a considerable slope. Ua Pou is served by Air Tahiti shuttle planes (via Atuona on the island of Hiva Oa). The airfield is connected to the town of Hakahau by a steep and winding 10 km road.

Hakahau Bay has a harbor protected by a breakwater, which also allows smaller cruise ships to call.

== Economy ==
The inhabitants live mainly from subsistence agriculture. The main foods are still fish and other marine animals, as well as yams, taro, breadfruit, coconuts, bananas and other tropical and subtropical fruits.

Although there are some private guesthouses with modest amenities, tourism plays only a minor role from an economic point of view.

=== Tourism ===
In Hakahau, there is a small museum with a collection of art and objects of worship of the island. Next to it, a traditional Marquesan dwelling (tenai paepae) has been reconstructed on a habitable platform.

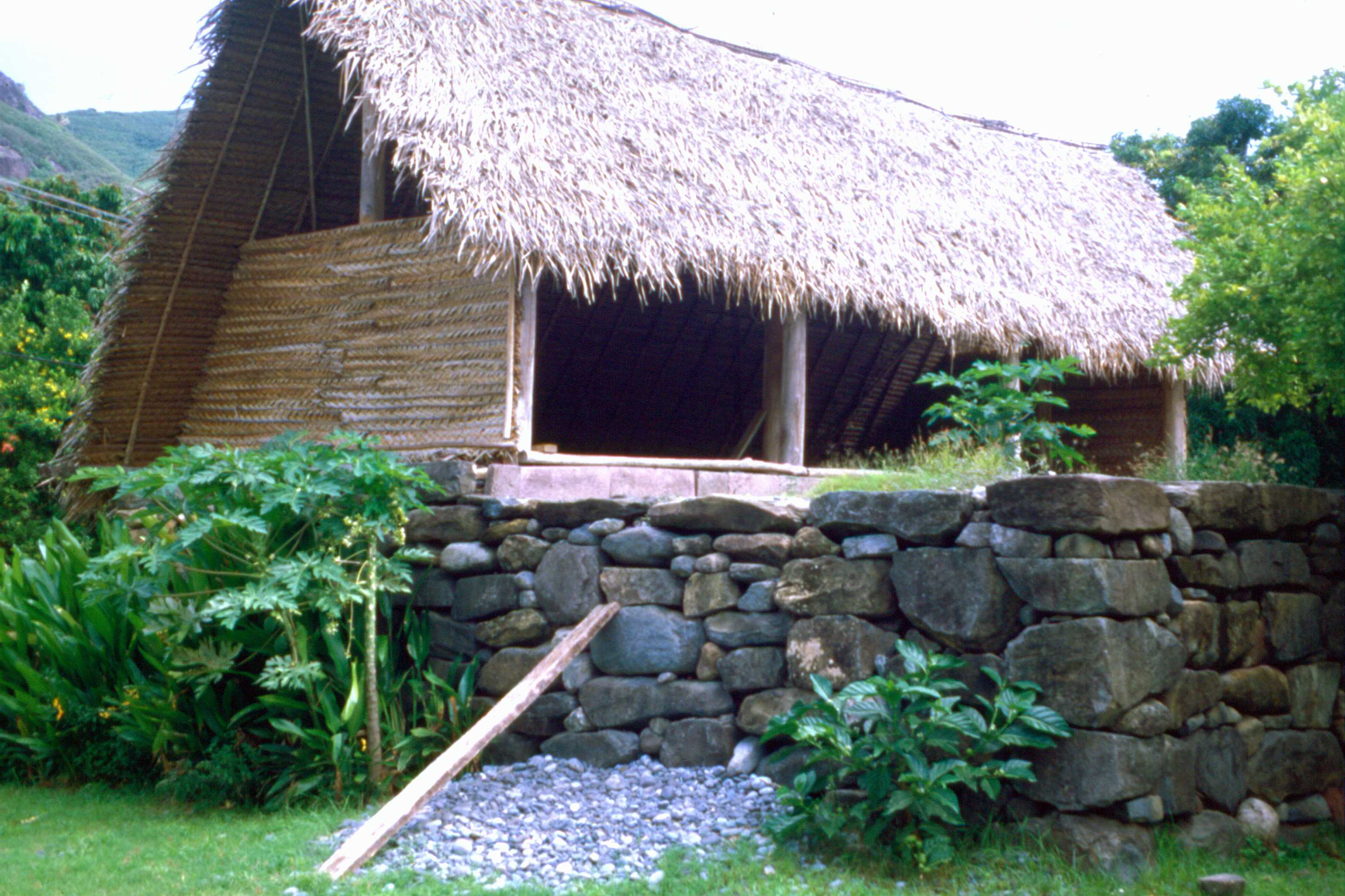
Reconstruction of a traditional marquesan house on Ua Pou Island, Marquesas Islands

In several valleys are the remains of Polynesian aboriginal settlements, recognizable by their densely covered paepae (house platforms). Little has been discovered or restored. The settlement of Chief Heato and his clan, revered as divine, is in the Hakamoui valley, covered with coconut and fan palms, mango chestnut trees, pandanus and huge banyan trees. The widely branched complex covers the entire valley, although the residential and ceremonial platforms hidden in the dense undergrowth are not easy to spot. Associated buildings made of short-lived materials are long gone. Karl von den Steinen believed he had identified the ceremonial platform (marae) where Chief Heato was buried. He photographed the skeletal remains of his grandson Teiki Teiuao, which had been deposited on the stone pedestal in a celestial (temporary) burial.

An excellent example of the island's developed stonework is an expressive tiki head made of light-colored Ke'etu tufa stone on the façade of a residential platform in the "Young Women's Plaza" (mata'aute'a). Another place worth seeing is the Paaumea Valley in the west of the island. Interesting, but not easy to identify in the dense vegetation, are the remains of a tohua, a kind of political and ritual center with chief's residence, meeting place and house (ha'e ko'o'ua or elders' house), warriors' house (ha'e toa), tattoo house (ha'e patu tiki) and cooking place (ha'e kuki).

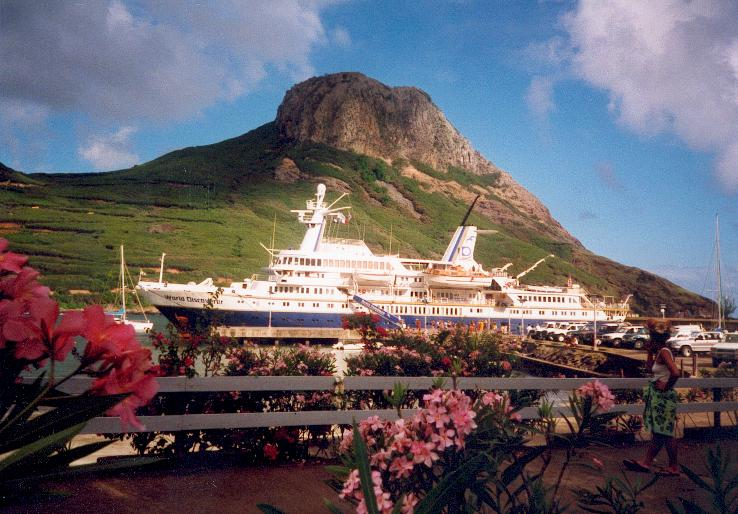
The World Discoverer Vessel at Ua Pou

In Ua Pou you can find or buy so-called "flower stones.” These are rare trachyte stones with decorative inclusions that look like flowers.

Ua Pou is known for its excellent wood carvers. In Hakahau, there are several talented artists whose works can be purchased. Since the first Marquesas Art Festival was held on Ua Pou in 1987, it has become a regular activity, held every year in different locations.

== Religion ==
At present, the majority of the population professes Christianity as a result of the activity of both Catholic and Protestant missionaries.

The French Catholic mission in the Marquesas from 1838 to 1839 under the auspices of Admiral Abel Aubert Dupetit-Thouars did not initially have any consequences for Ua Pou. In the Hakamoui valley lived the chief Heato (atua heato = God Heato), a follower of the ancient religion with human sacrifice and ritual cannibalism, who was revered as divine.

He fiercely resisted European occupiers and missionaries. He was said to have a preference for untattooed human flesh, a rumor that made a longer stay seem less desirable to Europeans. It was only after Heato's death in 1846 that the French missionaries were able to gain a foothold. Hakahetau has the first stone church in the Marquesas, built in 1859. It is dedicated to St. Joseph. Heato's daughter and successor, Teiki Teiuao, managed to unite all the tribes of the island under her hegemony in 1860 with the help of European firearms. However, a smallpox epidemic almost completely depopulated the island and put an end to her imperial aspirations.

Hakahau's most notable building is the Eglise Saint Étienne, built in 1981 and dedicated to St. Stephen. The modern church is built in the traditional Polynesian style. The interior decoration shows the high level of the art of carving in the Marquesas. The unusual boat-shaped pulpit is carved from the stump of a huge tropical tree rooted in the ground.

== See also ==
- Overseas France
- Dependent Territory
