= Ho'oumi =

- Town
- Location in the Marquesas Islands
- Coordinates: 8°53′12.277″S 140°1′51.448″W
- Country: France
- Overseas collectivity: French Polynesia
- Territory: Marquesas Islands
- Island: Nuka Hiva

Area
  - Total: 0.434 km^{2} (0.168 sq mi)
- Elevation: 275 m (902 ft)

Ho'oumi is a town on Nuku Hiva island. It is located along Taioha'e Bay.
