= Vaipō Waterfall =

Waterfall on the island of Nuku Hiva in the Marquesas of French Polynesia

Coordinates: 8°54′25″S 140°09′58″W

Vaipo Waterfall
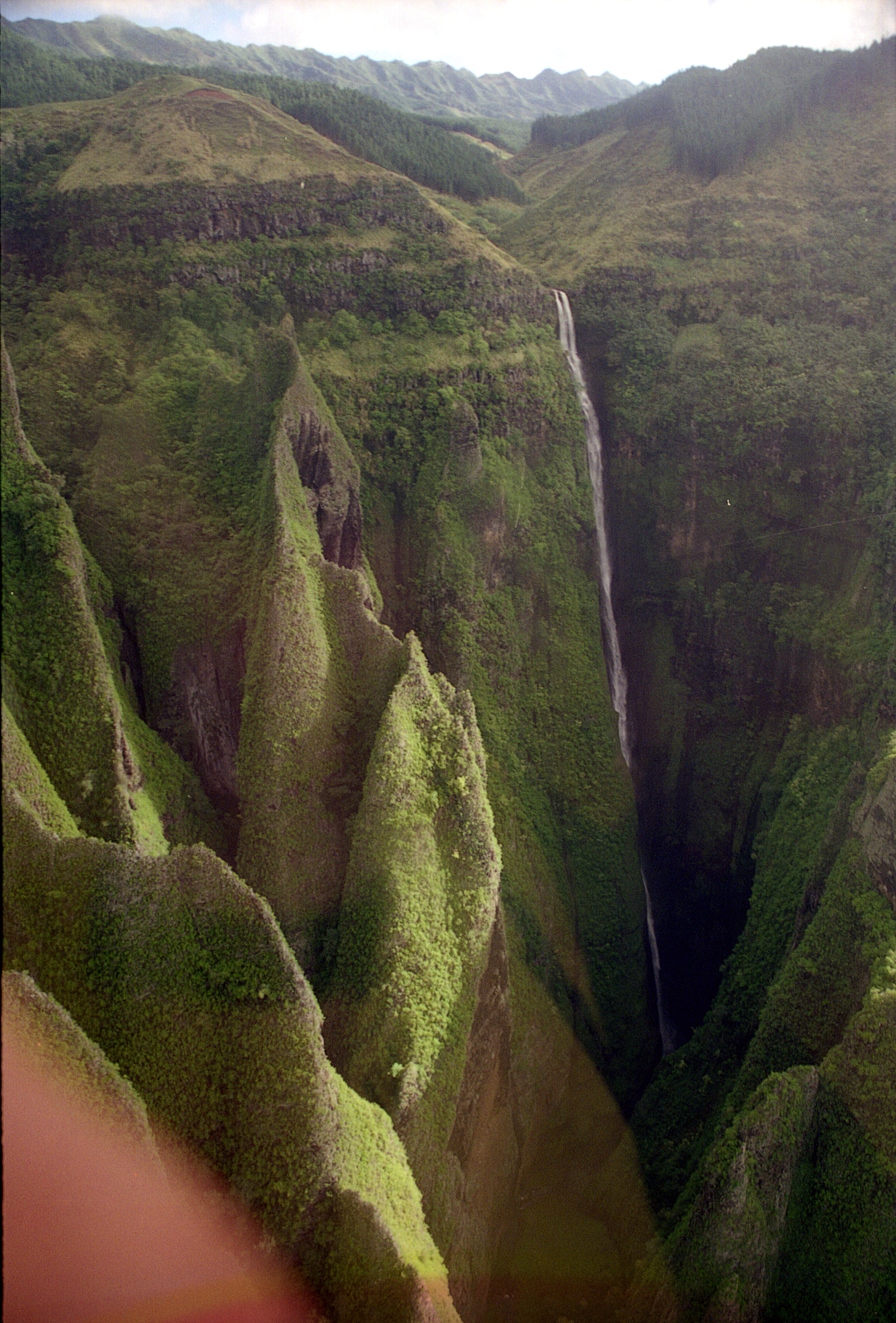
- Interactive map of Vaipo Waterfall
- Location: Nuku Hiva, Marquesas
- Type: Horsetail
- Total height: 350 m (1,150 ft)
- Number of drops: 1
- Longest drop: 350 m (1,150 ft)
- Average flow rate: 1 m³/s / 25 ft³/s
- World height ranking: 199

Vaipo Waterfall (also Ahuii or Ahuei) is a waterfall on the island of Nuku Hiva, in the Marquesas of French Polynesia. It is a horsetail-type waterfall with a single drop of height 1148 ft (350 m), making it the tallest waterfall in Polynesia outside of New Zealand and Hawaii.

The waterfall lies in Hakaui Valley. The top of the waterfall is basalt, from which the water spouts as a single jet from its gouged channel. Before reaching the bottom of the fall, the water vaporizes into mist which coats the walls of the canyon, giving them a glossy sheen.
