= Aʻakapa =

- Village
- Location in the Marquesas Islands
- Coordinates: 8°49′10″S 140°07′50″W
- Country: France
- Overseas collectivity: French Polynesia
- Territory: Marquesas Islands
- Island: Nuka Hiva

Area
  - Total: 0.453 km^{2} (0.175 sq mi)

Population (1996 census)
  - Total: 115
  - Density: 254/km^{2} (660/sq mi)

Aʻakapa is a small village on Nuku Hiva, in the Marquesas Islands. It lies on Aʻakapa Bay.
