= Te Iʼi =

Province in the Marquesas Islands

Coordinates: 8°52′25″S 140°10′00″W

Te Iʻi is a traditional province of Nuku Hiva, in the Marquesas Islands. The province covers slightly more than the western two-thirds of the island. The western coast is characterized by steep slopes which plunge directly into the sea, indented occasionally by small bays leading to short deep valleys leading to the interior.

== Geography ==
The northern coast is indented by the four good-sized bays, Haka Ehu, Haka Ea (also called Haka Puʻa), Aʻa Kapa, and Haume. The southern coast is, like the western coast, characterized by steep slopes, and even cliffs, that plunge into the sea. These are broken by a succession of bays, the deep bay of Haka Ui in the southwest, with its neighboring bay Ua Uka, and near the center of the southern coast, Haʻa o Tupa, just west of the deep bay of Tai o Hae, location of the island's chief town, of the same name. To the east of Tai o Hae is a peninsula on the east side of which are the two small valleys of Haka Puu Vae and Haka Paʻa. On either side of the entrance to Tai o Hae, are small rocky islands, called "the sentinels", named Motu Nui on the west side, and Mata ʻUa Puna on the east side of the entrance to the bay.

The interior of Te Iʻi is a high plateau, called Tōviʻi, which is covered primarily by a tall-grass grassland. The highest peak on Nuku Hiva Tekao is along the northwestern edge of this plateau, reaching a height of 1,224 m (4,016 ft.).

== History ==
Te Iʻi was formerly inhabited by a number of warring tribes, who were united only in times of war with the tribes of Tai Pī, the province covering the remainder of the island. There is some anecdotal evidence that indicates that the tribes of Ua Pou were sometimes united with the tribes of Te Iʻi in war against Tai Pī. Despite the fact that tribes from both the eastern and western halves of Ua Pu were often united in war against each other, however, it appears that such differences among them were not considered when members of tribes from either side of the island sought refuge among the tribes of Te Iʻi on Nuku Hiva.

=== Nuku Hiva Campaign ===
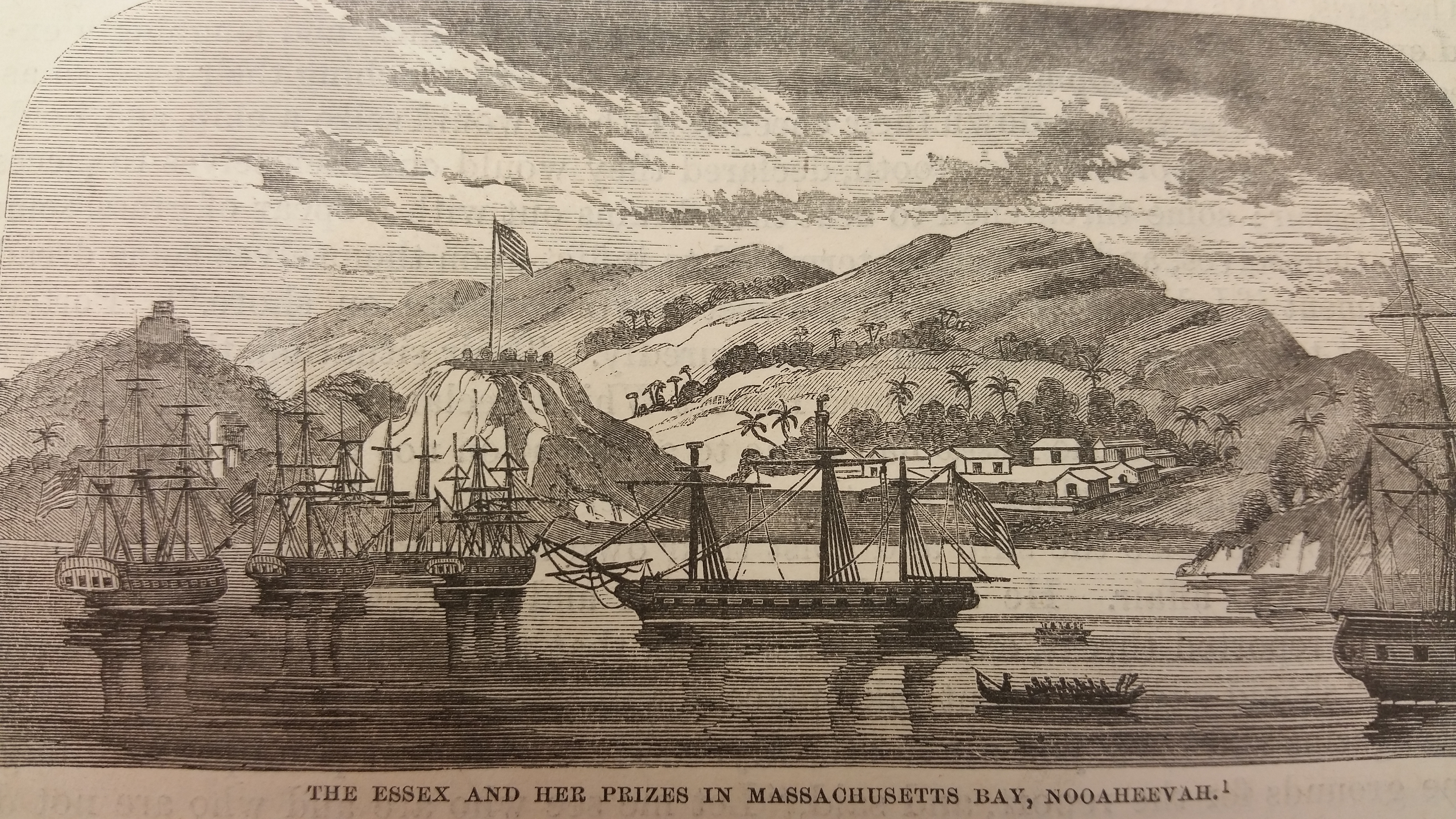
The American fleet at Nuka Hiva in 1813

During the wars between the Te Iʻi and the Tai Pī in 1813, the American navy Captain David Porter arrived with the frigate USS Essex and ten other armed ships on October 25. A shore party was landed and they claimed the island for the United States and constructed a small village, named Madisonville. A fort and a dock was also built, the latter to refit the Essex. Almost immediately Porter became involved in the tribal conflict. The first expedition into the jungle was led by Lieutenant John Downes. He and forty others captured a fort held by 3,000 to 4,000 Happah warriors with the assistance of several hundred Te Iʻis. The victory forced the Happah to terms and they allied themselves with both the Americans and the Te Iʻi. A second expedition was led by Porter himself and he made an amphibious assault against the Tai Pī held coastline. 5,000 Te Iʻis and Happahs accompanied the fleet in at least 200 war-canoes. Though the landing was unopposed, Porter's force of thirty men and a cannon led the march inland where they found another, more formidable, enemy fort. Thousands of natives armed with rocks and spears, positioned in a formidable mountain fortress, were able to fend off their enemies. The victory was short-lived however and Captain Porter followed up his landing with an expedition overland, bypassing the fort, to threaten the Tai Pī's village center in Typee Valley as the Americans named it.

When the column arrived at their destination it was November 30 of 1813. The first shots fired occurred after the Tai Pis attempted to ambush the column, the attack was beaten off and the Porter issued a messing warning that if the Tai Pi did not cease their resistance at once, he would destroy the villages. After a little while of waiting, the hostiles seemed to ignore the demands so the expedition advanced. An engagement ensued as the villages were burned. In the end, the Americans and their Te Iʻi and Happah allies had won at severe cost to the enemy, who sued for peace soon after. The next few months were peaceful until May 1814. The War of 1812 between the United States and the United Kingdom was in its third year most of the American fleet was captured British privateers. At least six British prisoners were at Nuku Hiva during the American operations against the natives, not including a number who volunteered to fight for Captain Porter. But in December 1813, Porter left Nuka Hiva to continue raiding British whalers. He left behind only nineteen navy sailors and six prisoners under two midshipmen and United States Marine Corps Lieutenant John M. Gamble. On May 7, 1814, a group of the British sailors mutinied, released the six prisoners and attacked the fort. Gamble was wounded in the foot and taken captive with his remaining men on the corvette Seringapatam though the Americans were set adrift later that day.

An Englishman, named Wilson, on the island was used as an interpreter by Porter and on May 9 he convinced the Te Iʻi that Porter would not return which the natives were not happy about. Wilson eventually persuaded the Te Iʻis to cancel the alliance and attack. Six American sailors were on the beach at Madisonville when the Te Iʻis attacked, Four of the men were killed and one other man escaped wounded with a second survivor. Gamble was alone on the Sir Andrew Hammond, one of the captured British ships. While still recovering from his wound to the foot, two Te Iʻi war-canoes attacked the ship. The ship's cannon were already loaded so Lieutenant Gamble stumbled from one gun to another, firing them as fast as he could. Ultimately Gamble beat off the enemy attack single-handedly though after the deaths of four of his men in town, there was no choice but to abandon the colony with the remaining seven, all of whom were either wounded or ill. After that the base was never again occupied by American forces. Captain Porter, who intended to sail back to Nuka Hiva, was captured at the Battle of Valparaiso on March 28.
