= Vogelgrun =

Commune in Grand Est, France

Vogelgrun Vogelgrien
- Commune
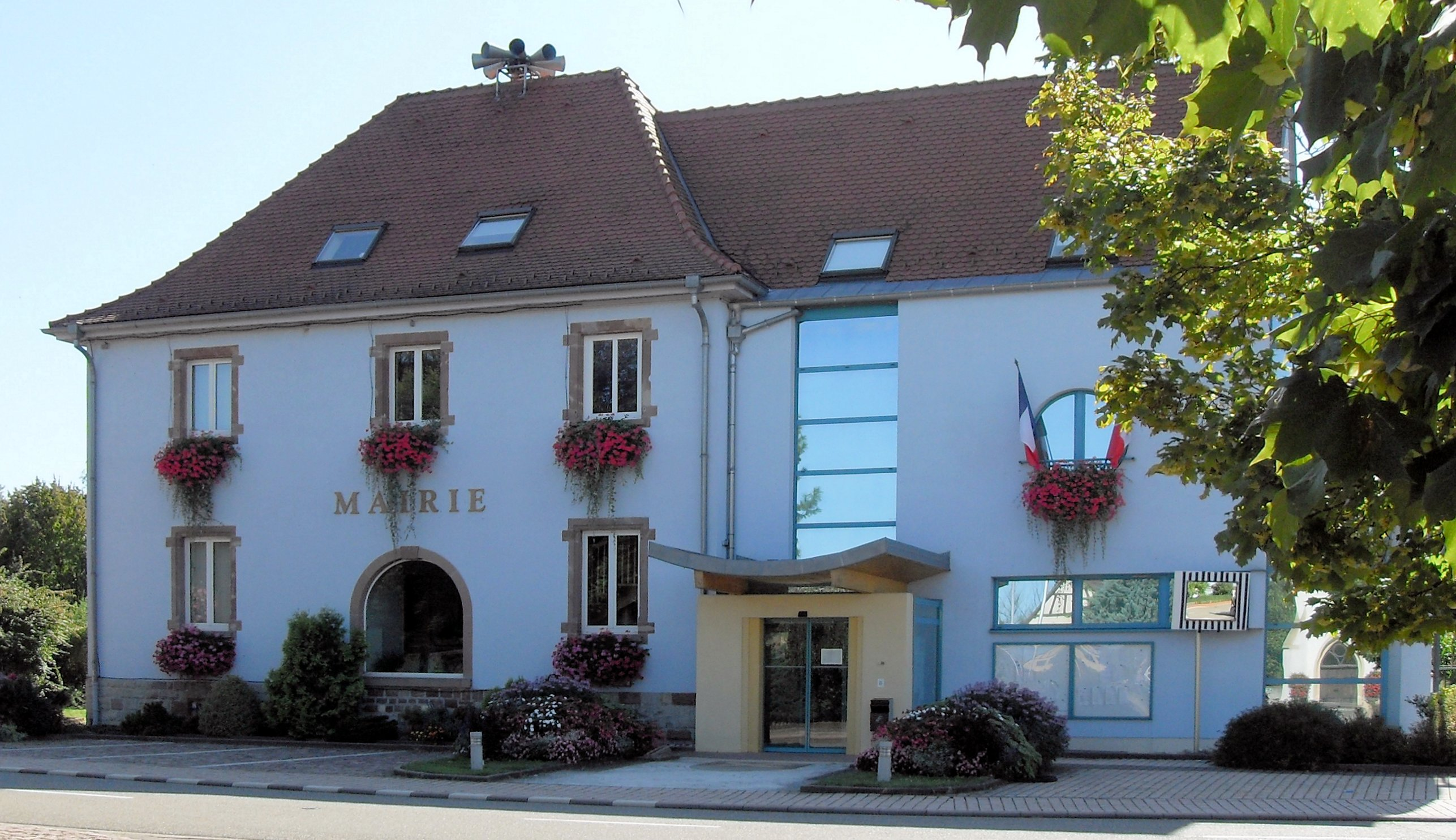
- The town hall in Vogelgrun

- Coat of arms
- Location of Vogelgrun
- Location within France Location within Grand Est
- Coordinates: 48°00′48″N 7°34′19″E
- Country: France
- Region: Grand Est
- Department: Haut-Rhin
- Arrondissement: Colmar-Ribeauvillé
- Canton: Ensisheim
- Intercommunality: CC Alsace Rhin Brisach

Government
  - Mayor (2020–2026): Mirko Pasqualini
- Area^{1}: 5.03 km^{2} (1.94 sq mi)
- Elevation: 192 m (630 ft)
- Highest elevation: 195 m (640 ft)
- Lowest elevation: 189 m (620 ft)
- Population (2023): 628
  - Density: 125/km^{2} (323/sq mi)
- Time zone: UTC+01:00 (CET)
  - Summer (DST): UTC+02:00 (CEST)
- INSEE/Postal code: 68351 /68600
- ^{1} French Land Register data, which excludes lakes, ponds, glaciers > 1 km^{2} (0.386 sq mi or 247 acres) and river estuaries.

Vogelgrun (French pronunciation: [fogəlgʁyn]; Alemannic German: Vogelgrien; German: Vogelgrün) is a commune in the Haut-Rhin department in Grand Est in north-eastern France.

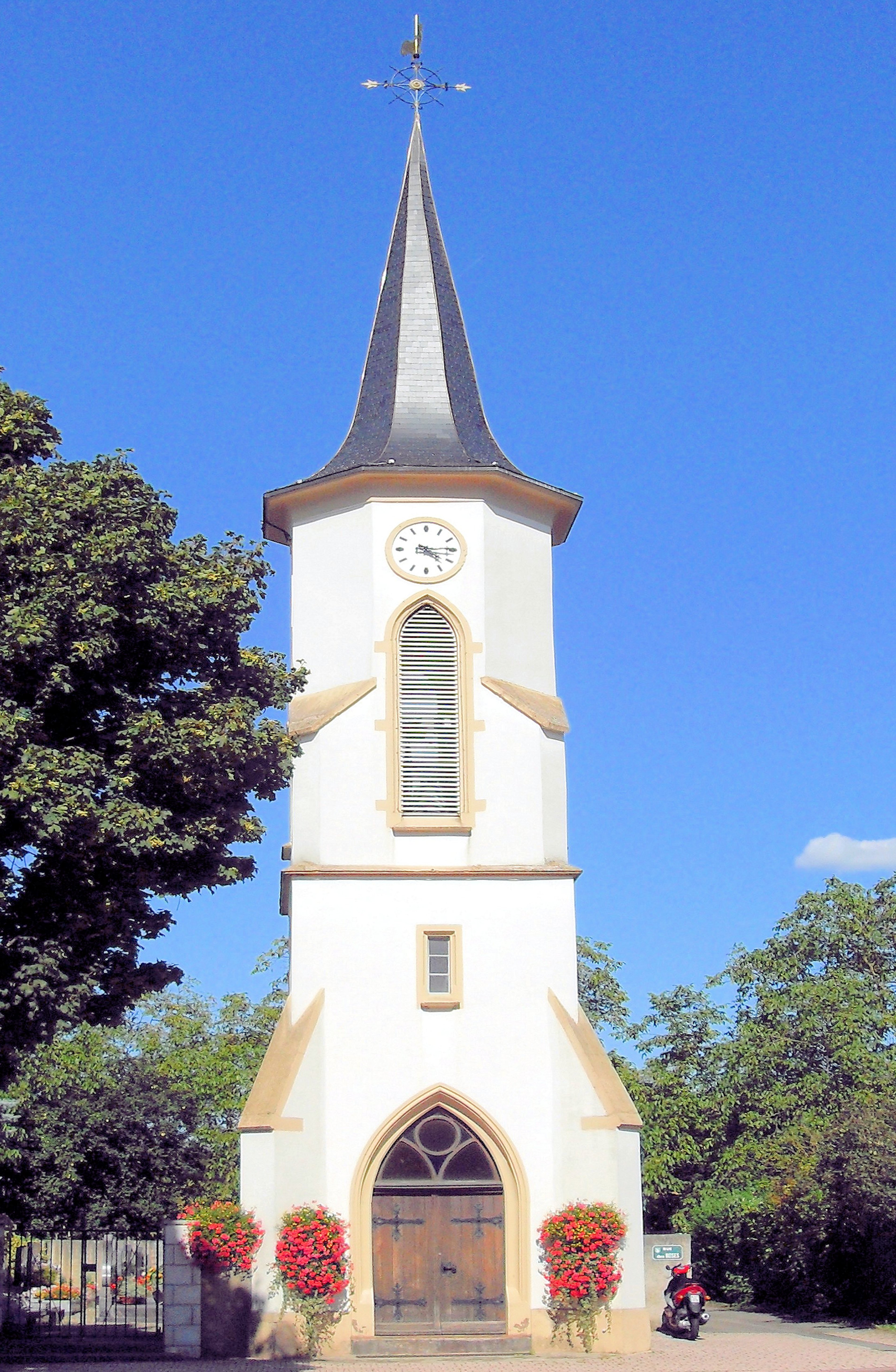
Remains of the old St. Alfonsus Church

== See also ==
- Communes of the Haut-Rhin department
