= Toʼoviʼi =

Coordinates: 8°51′23.67″S 140°8′43.61″W

Tōviʼi (or Toʼoviʼi) is a high plateau in western Nuku Hiva, French Polynesia, located in the traditional province of Te Iʼi. The primary vegetation of the plateau is tall grass.

Sediment cores from the plateau have been used to study Polynesia's paleoclimate.
