= Dienville =

Commune in Grand Est, France

- Commune
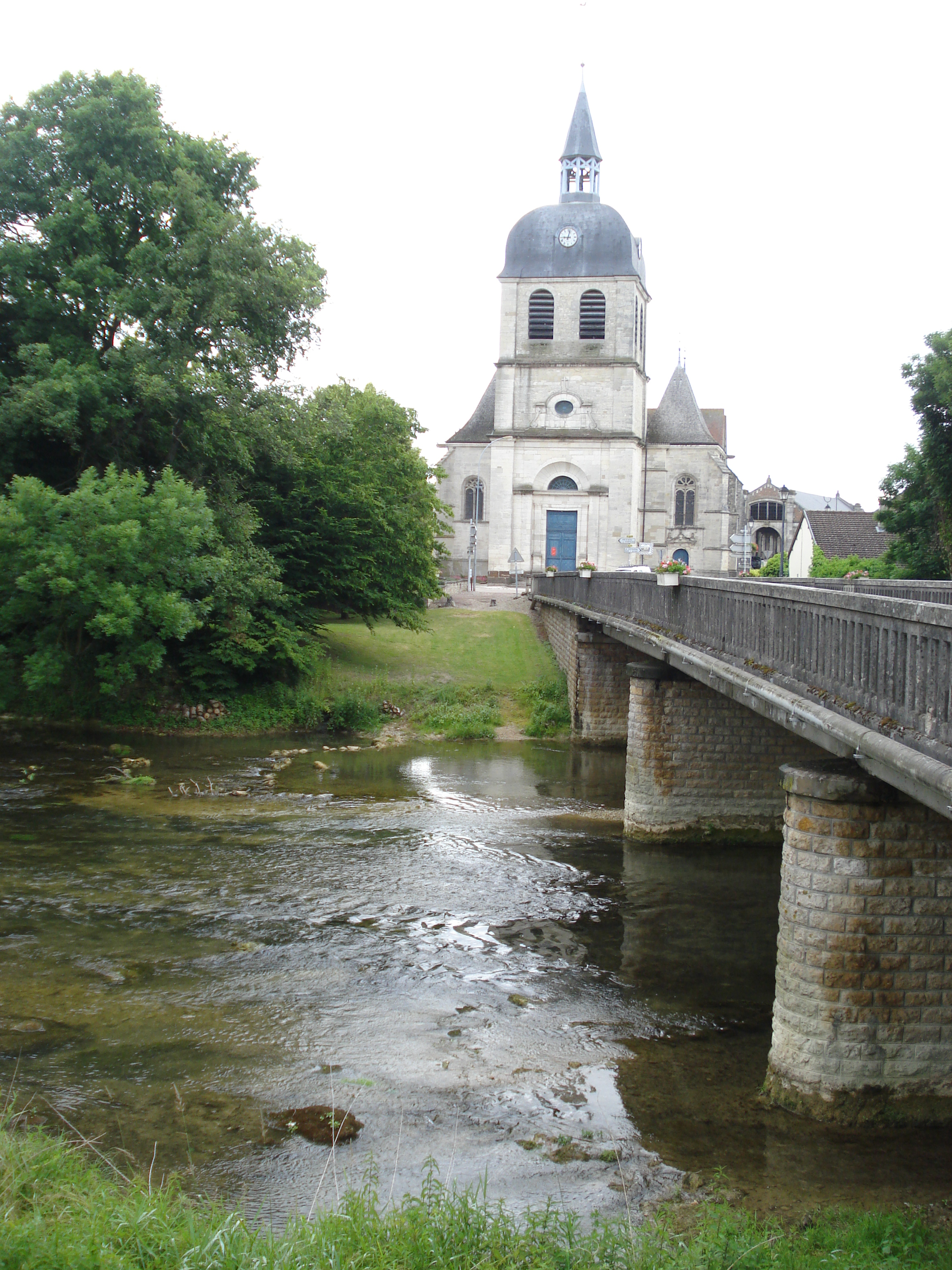
- The church and the bridge over the Aube river in Dienville

- Coat of arms
- Location of Dienville
- Location within France Location within Grand Est
- Coordinates: 48°21′05″N 4°32′04″E
- Country: France
- Region: Grand Est
- Department: Aube
- Arrondissement: Bar-sur-Aube
- Canton: Brienne-le-Château

Government
  - Mayor (2020–2026): Claude Large
- Area^{1}: 20.34 km^{2} (7.85 sq mi)
- Elevation: 128 m (420 ft)
- Highest elevation: 186 m (610 ft)
- Lowest elevation: 120 m (390 ft)
- Population (2023): 813
  - Density: 40.0/km^{2} (104/sq mi)
- Time zone: UTC+01:00 (CET)
  - Summer (DST): UTC+02:00 (CEST)
- INSEE/Postal code: 10123 /10500
- ^{1} French Land Register data, which excludes lakes, ponds, glaciers > 1 km^{2} (0.386 sq mi or 247 acres) and river estuaries.

Dienville (French pronunciation: [djɛ̃vil]) is a commune in the Aube department in north-central France.

== History ==
The village of Dienville is mentioned in 864 under the name Dienvilla. There remains an Ancient Roman road, a vestige of that era.

On 1 February 1814 the village was fought over during the Battle of La Rothière.

== Population ==
Dienville was the home of Abbé Courtalon Delestre (1735-1786), a historian and poet, and fr:Jean-Baptiste Courtalon (1740-1797), Cleric of the Chapel for Louis XV and Chaplain of Louis XVI.

Historical population
Year	Pop.	±% p.a.
1968	844	—
1975	812	−0.55%
1982	781	−0.55%
1990	796	+0.24%
1999	747	−0.70%
2007	805	+0.94%
2012	905	+2.37%
2017	881	−0.54%
2023	813	−1.33%
Source: INSEE

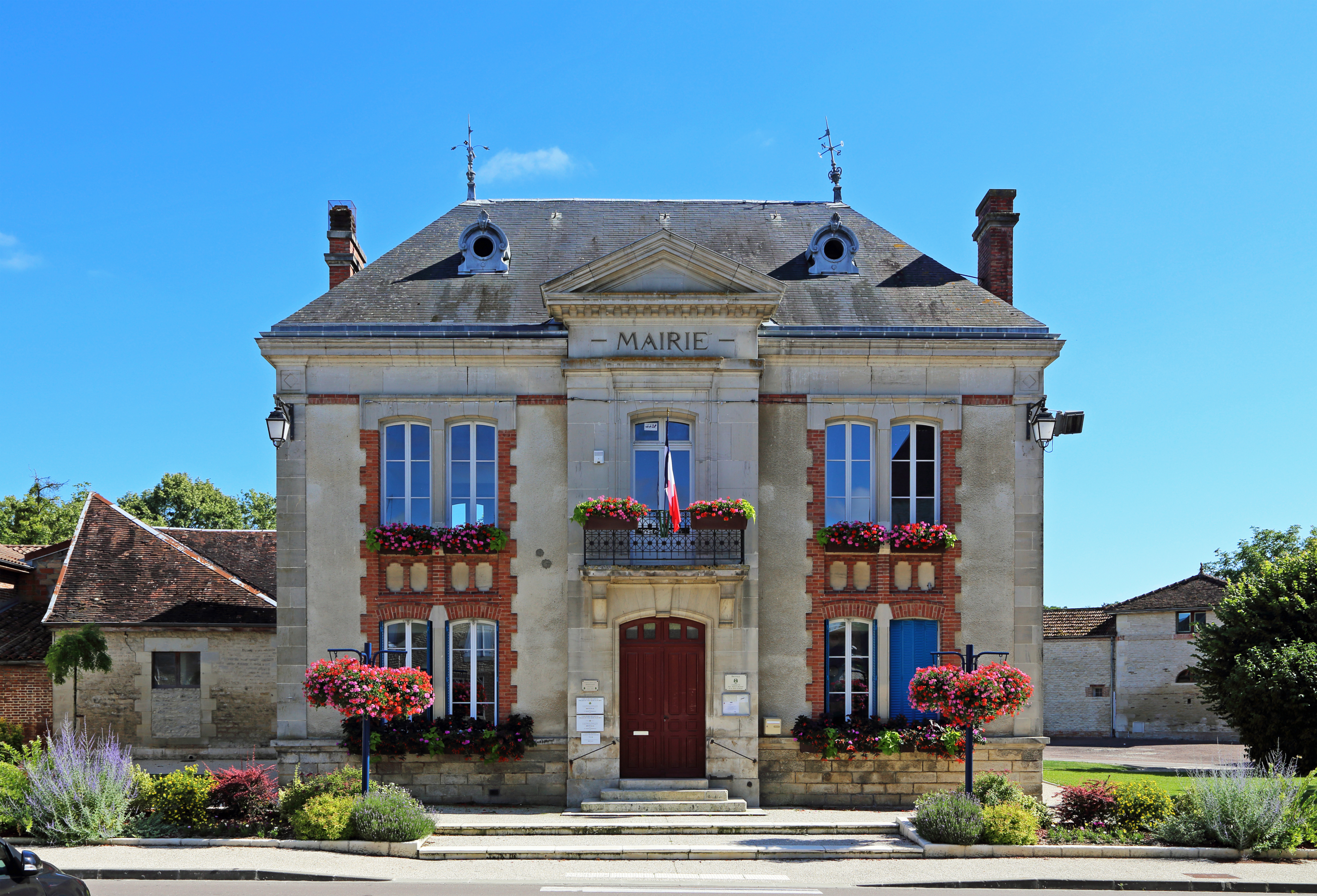
Town hall

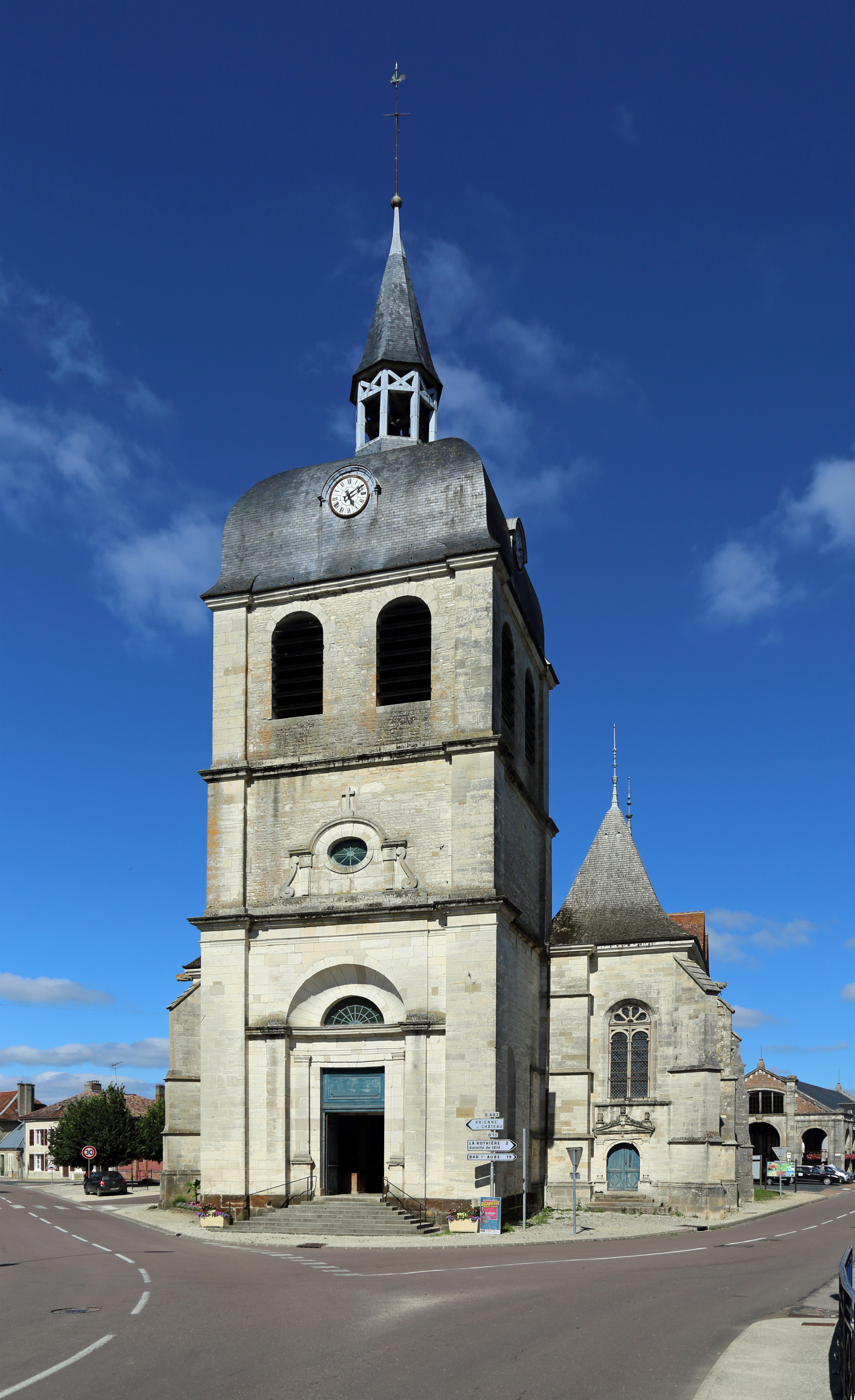
Saint Quentin church

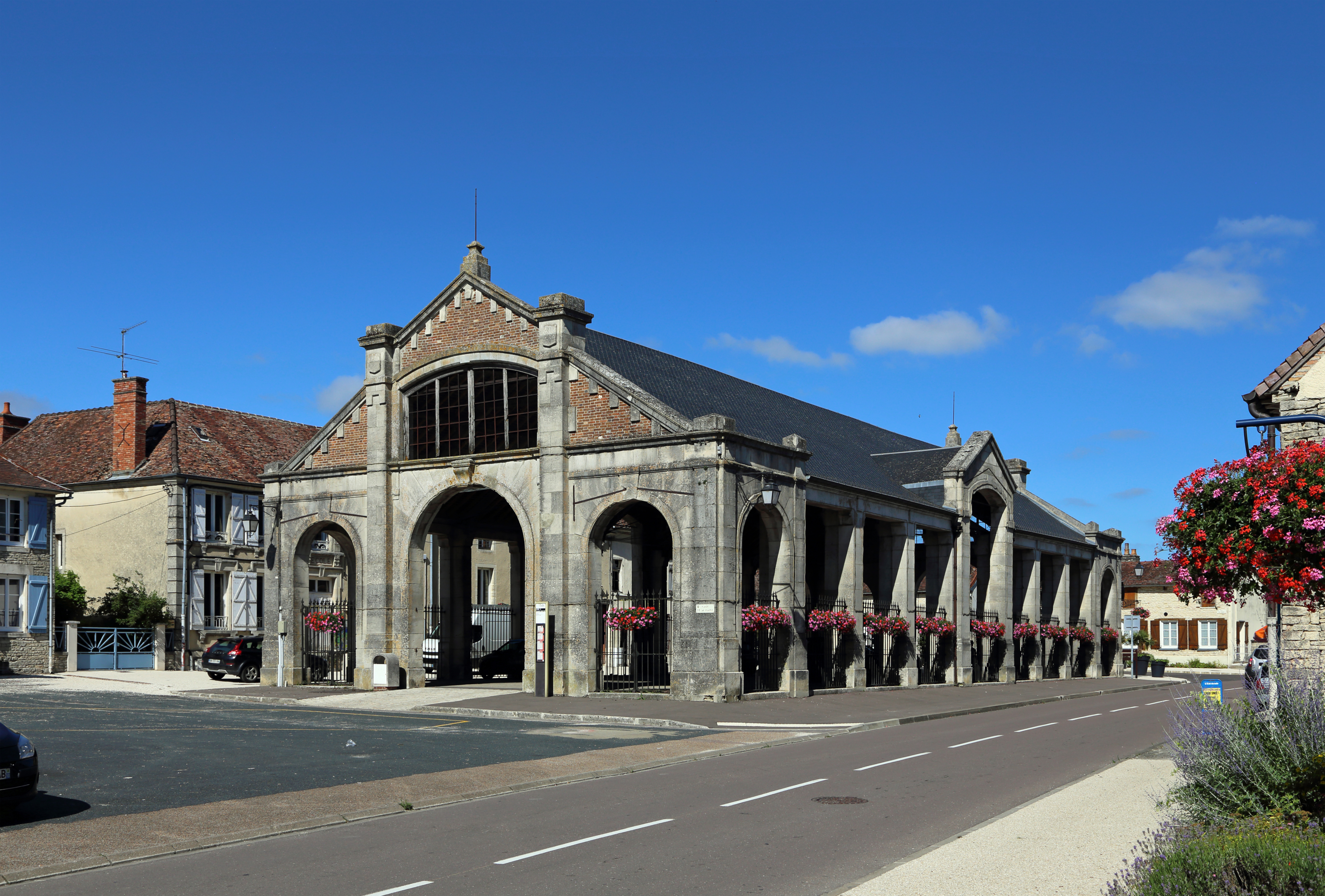
Market hall

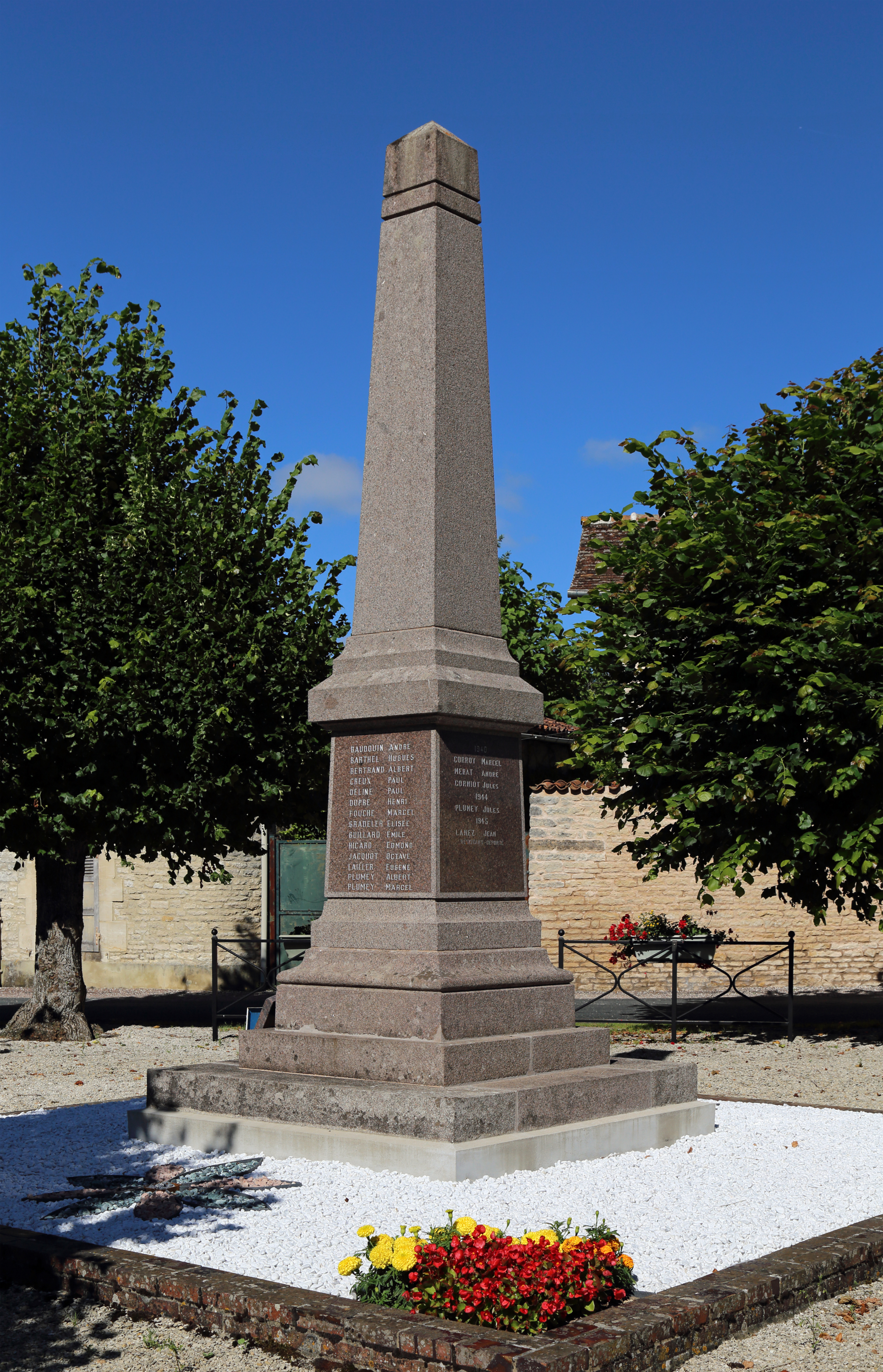
War memorial

== See also ==
- Communes of the Aube department
- Parc naturel régional de la Forêt d'Orient
