= Nuku Hiva =

Island in French Polynesia

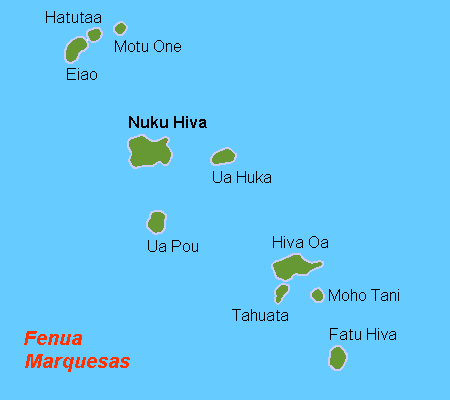
- Map showing the location of Nuku Hiva within the Marquesas Islands

- Location within Pacific Ocean

Geography
- Location: South Pacific Ocean
- Coordinates: 8°52′S 140°08′W
- Archipelago: Marquesas Islands
- Area: 339 km^{2} (131 sq mi)
- Highest elevation: 1,224 m (4016 ft)
- Highest point: Tekao

Administration
- France
- Overseas country: French Polynesia

Demographics
- Population: 3,120 (2017)
- Pop. density: 7.8/km^{2} (20.2/sq mi)

Nuku Hiva (sometimes spelled Nukahiva or Nukuhiva) is the largest of the Marquesas Islands in French Polynesia, an overseas country of France in the Pacific Ocean. It was formerly also known as Île Marchand and Madison Island.

Herman Melville wrote his book Typee based on his experiences in the Taipivai valley in the eastern part of Nuku Hiva. Robert Louis Stevenson's first landfall on his voyage on the Casco was at Hatihe'u, on the north side of the island, in 1888.

== Geography ==
=== Coast ===
Western Nuku Hiva is characterized by a steep but fairly regular coastline, indented occasionally by small bays, leading to deep valleys, which in turn lead into the interior. There are no villages on the western side. The coastline of the eastern part of the island has few places to land by sea and takes the brunt of the ocean swells. The northern side, in contrast, is indented by deep bays, the largest of which are Anahō and Hatihe'u. A third bay, 'A'akapa, is smaller and lies next to a village of the same name. The southern side has fewer bays. One is at Taioha'e. Three others, at Taipivai, Ho'oumi, and Hakaui, are part of the larger Baie du Contrôleur. Another two, at Hakau'i and Hakatea, are both accessed by the same narrow entrance.

In Vaihi ridge just south of Taipivai, there exists petroglyphs that records the introduction of horses brought into the island by Admiral Abel Aubert du Petit-Thouars in 1842.

=== Inland ===
The central part of the island is a high plateau called To'ovi'i, covered primarily by a tall-grass prairie, on which experiments in cattle raising are taking place for the first time.

On the western edge of To'ovi'i rises Tekao, the island's highest peak, which reaches an elevation of 1,224 metres (4,016 ft). The western and northern edges of To'ovi'i are a mountain ridge, which catches much of the rain that waters the island.

Pine forest plantations covering large areas all around the crater of To'ovi'i give an overall impression of the lower Alps and parts of Germany, Wales and Switzerland. In one place, Vaipō Waterfall, the collected water falls off a highland and falls 350 metres (1,150 ft).

The slopes of the north western side of the island are much drier than the rest of the island, and are often described as a desert named Te Henua a Taha or "Terre Déserte" in French.

== Administration ==
Nuku Hiva is administratively part of the commune (municipality) of Nuku-Hiva, itself in the administrative subdivision of the Marquesas Islands.

The administrative centre of the commune of Nuku-Hiva and also of the administrative subdivision of the Marquesas Islands is the settlement of Taioha'e, located on the south side of Nuku Hiva, at the head of the bay of that same name.

== Demographics ==
Demographic evolution of Nuku Hiva since 1971

The population in 2007 was 2,660. This is substantially less than that encountered at the end of the 16th century when the Spaniards first sighted the island. Contacts with Europeans may have brought New World infections such as venereal disease and influenza, causing high mortality. Historical sources are sparse, and it is unclear when various diseases commonly seen in the New World, Europe and Asia first appeared in Nuku Hiva. The population has increased to 3,210 by 2017.

The population is primarily Polynesian with a small proportion of Europeans, mostly from Metropolitan France. At the 2002 census, 92.6% of Nuku Hiva's residents were born in French Polynesia while 148 people, making up 5.6% of Nuku Hiva's residents, were people born in Metropolitan France.

== Life ==
The primary diet of people tends to be breadfruit, taro, manioc, coconut and many kinds of fruit, which grow in abundance. Goats, fish and, more rarely, pigs, are the main sources of meat but there is a growing amount of local beef available. Imported food is also available, including apples, grapes, celery, and even sliced bread from New Zealand. Considerable amounts of rice are also eaten. There is a large population of wild pigs on the island which are a cross between the Polynesian pigs brought by the first settlers from peninsular Southeast Asia and the wild boars brought by the Europeans.

There is a prison on the island, which is notable for being the smallest in France. It uses an open prison regime, and prisoners are free to use the grounds with a minimum of supervision. Prisoners who do not follow the model are returned to prison in Papeete.

== Transportation ==
Nuku Hiva is served by a single-runway airport in the northwest corner of the island, approximately 50 kilometres (31 mi) by road, northwest of Taioha'e. The airport was opened on 14 December 1980.

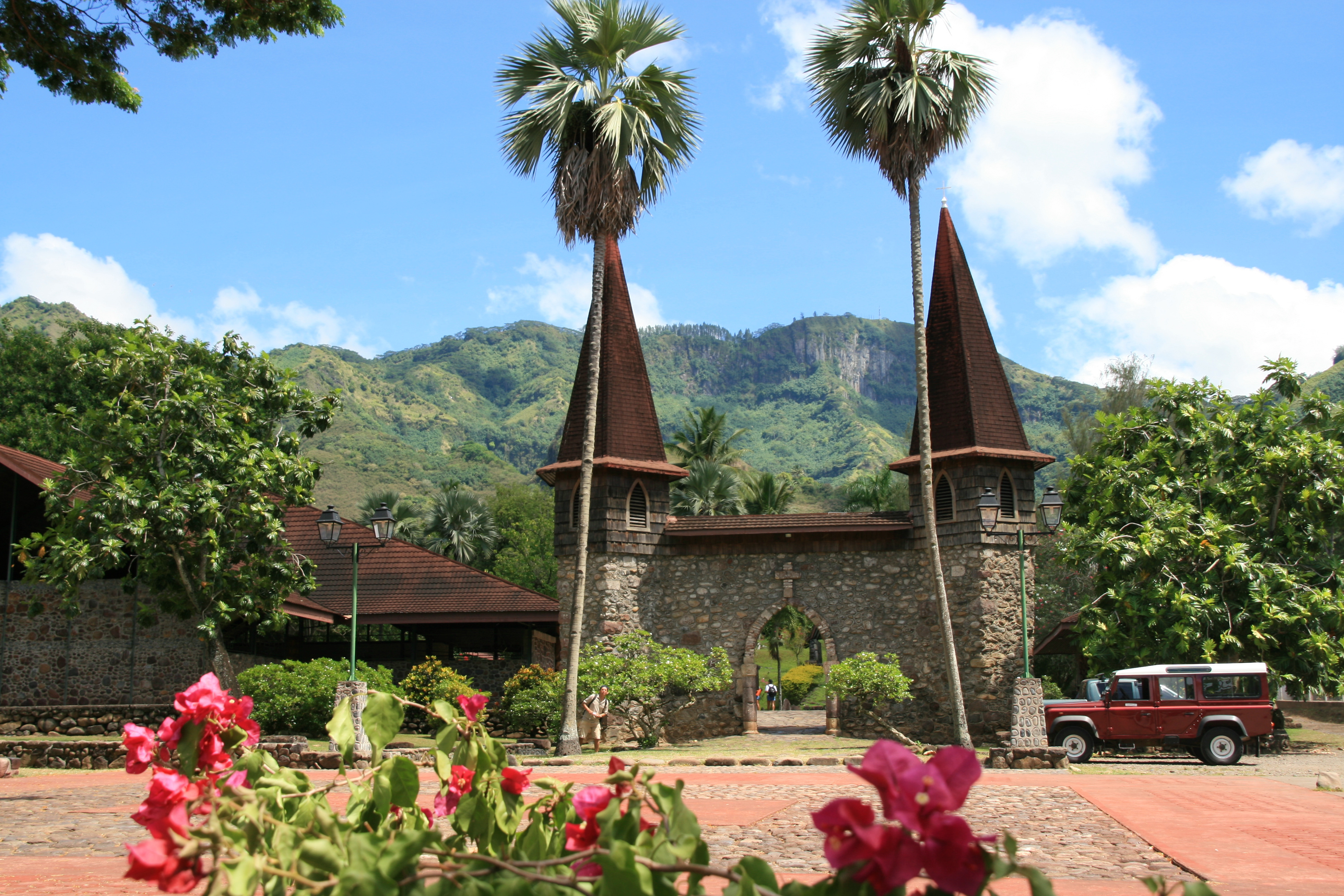
Cathedral of Our Lady of the Marquesas Islands in Nuku Hiva

== Communication ==
Nuku Hiva Island was connected to French Polynesia via a Submarine fiber optic cable system called NATITUA in 2018. The submarine cable has a total design capacity of more than 10 Tbit/s. This has led to high speed internet access for its inhabitants. The island has both fixed-line and 4G connectivity.

== Religion ==
The majority of the island's population, as is the case in the Marquesas Islands, is Christian as a result of European colonisation and the activity of both Catholic and Protestant missionaries. The site (specifically Taiohae) is home to the Cathedral of Our Lady of the Marquesas Islands (Cathédrale Notre-Dame des Îles Marquises), seat of the Diocese of Taiohae whose worshipers amount to 85% of the total population, according to 2018 data. Other churches under the same diocese include the Church of Saint Joseph in Taipivai (Église de Saint-Joseph), the Church of the Sacred Heart in Hatiheu (Église des Sacrés-Cœurs), Church of Saint Therese of the Infant Jesus in Aakapa (Église de Sainte-Thérèse-de-l'Enfant-Jésus)

== History ==
=== Historical period ===
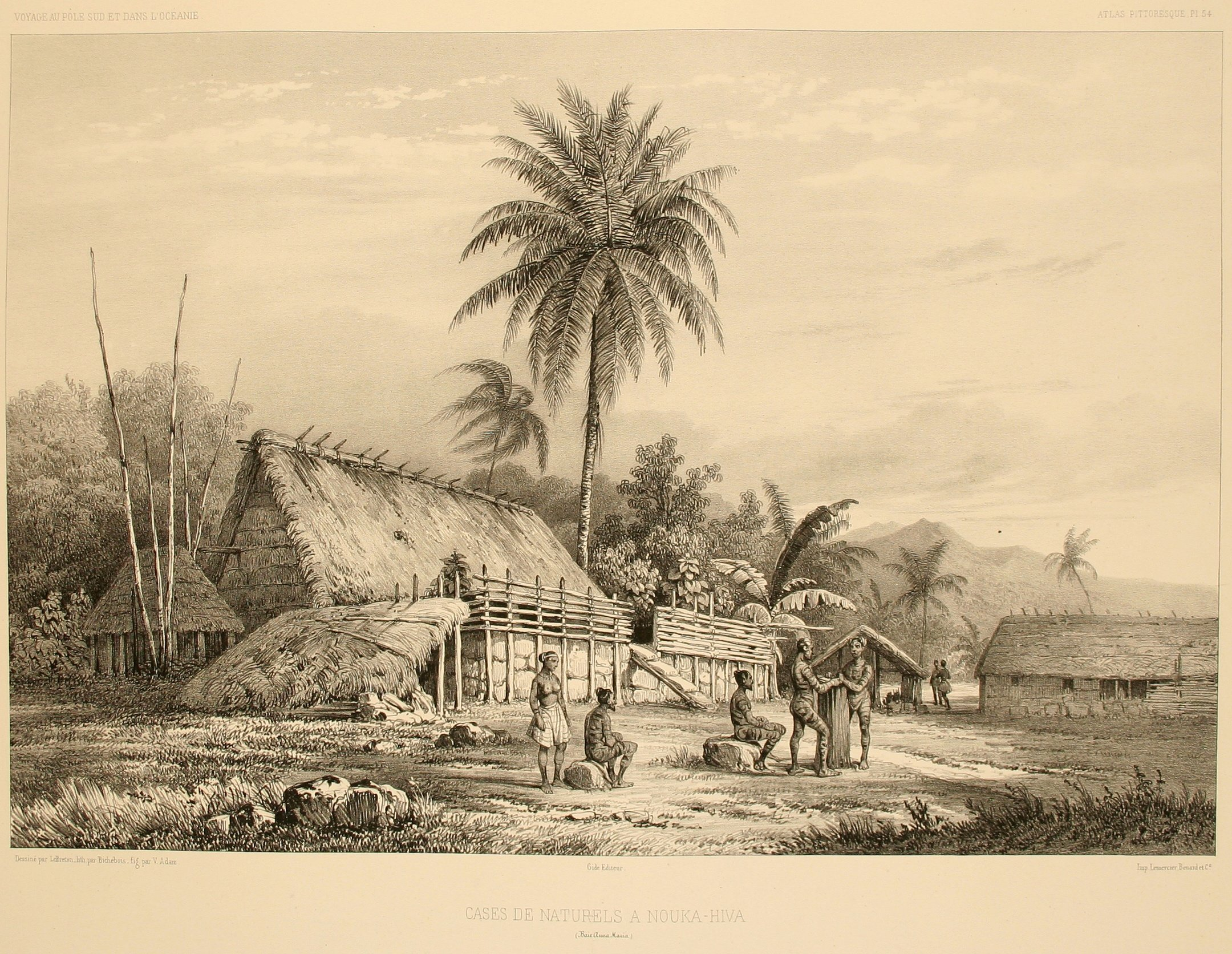
A lithograph from 1846 titled "Cases de naturels à Nouka-Hiva".

Nuku Hiva was, in historical times, the site of two provinces, Te I'i covering somewhat more than the western two thirds of the island, and Tai Pī, covering the eastern third.

Latest studies indicate that the first people to arrive here came from west Polynesia around 2000 years ago, only later colonizing Tahiti, Hawai'i, The Cook Islands and New Zealand. The legend has it that 'Ono, the god of creation, promised his wife to build a house in one day, so he gathered together land and created these islands, which are all named after parts of the house, Nuku Hiva being the roof. Everything he had left over he threw to one side and created a dump which is called 'Ua Huka. From these supposed origins the population rose to an untenable size; first European estimates vary from 50,000 to 100,000.

Food became of prime importance. Breadfruit was the staple, but taro, plantain and manioc also played a big part. As for meat, fish was the main source, but even so was limited because of the quantity needed to feed so many mouths. Pigs, chickens and dogs were also reared, and hunted when they took to the wild.

The extent to which cannibalism was practiced in pre-historic times is debated. Some anthropologists believe that ritualistic cannibalism once existed here, although others claim it is more of a myth. The tales of cannibalism received widespread publicity in 2011 when the burnt remains of a German visitor found on Nuku Hiva led to speculation that the victim may have been partially eaten. However, when the murderer was eventually arrested, tried, and convicted, the prosecution presented no evidence that cannibalism was involved.

=== Post-contact period ===
==== European exploration and whaling ====
On 21 July 1595, Álvaro de Mendaña de Neira stopped at Fatu Iva and called the islands Los Marquesas after the wife of the Viceroy of Peru. James Cook likewise visited the south in 1774, and the Solide expedition in 1791. There is little evidence that these visits led to the introduction of diseases, perhaps because slow passages inhibited the diseases aboard the ships. It seems that it was the commercial shipping, taking on sandalwood, and the whaling ships that brought the epidemics that killed nine out of ten Polynesians.

==== Nuku Hiva Campaign ====
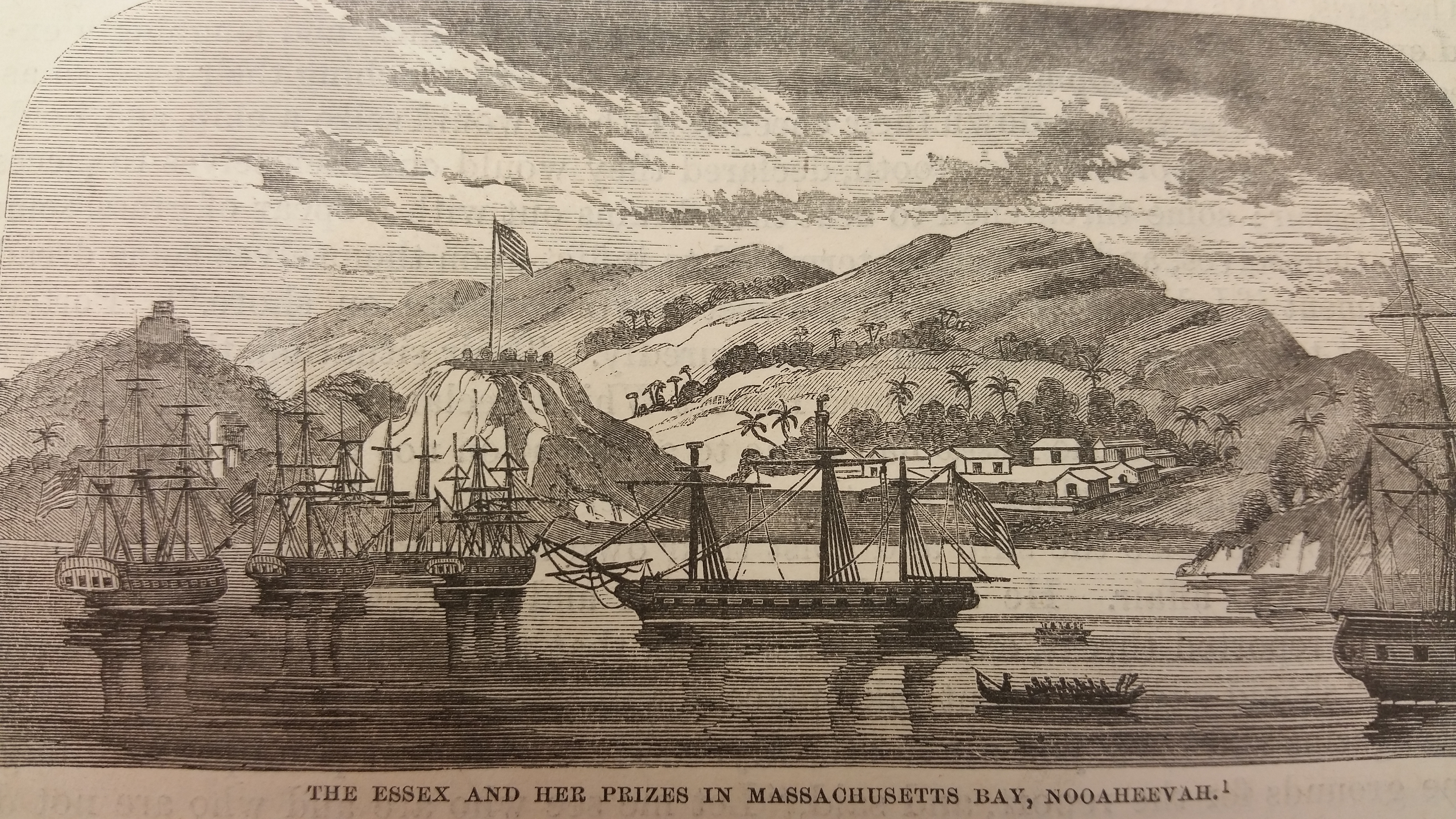
The American fleet at Nuka Hiva in 1813.

During the wars between the Te I'i and the Tai Pī, on 25 October 25, 1813, the American Captain David Porter arrived in the frigate USS Essex, the flagship of his fleet of ten other armed ships. A shore party was landed and they claimed the island for the United States and constructed a small village, named Madisonville. A fortification, named Fort Madison, and a dock were also built, the latter to refit the Essex. Almost immediately Porter became involved in the tribal conflict.

The first expedition into the jungle was led by Lieutenant John Downes. He and forty others, with the assistance of several hundred Te I'is, captured a fort held by 3,000 to 4,000 Happah warriors. The victory forced the Happah to terms and they allied themselves with both the Americans and the Te I'i. Porter himself led a second expedition in which he made an amphibious assault against the Tai Pī held coastline. Five thousand Te I'is and Happahs accompanied the fleet in at least 200 war-canoes.

The landing was unopposed. Porter's force of thirty men and a cannon led the march inland where they found another, more formidable, enemy fort. The thousands of natives, armed with rocks and spears but positioned in a formidable mountain fortress, were able to fend off their attackers. The victory was short-lived however and Captain Porter followed up his landing with an expedition overland, bypassing the fort, to threaten the Tai Pī's village center in Typee Valley, as the Americans named it.

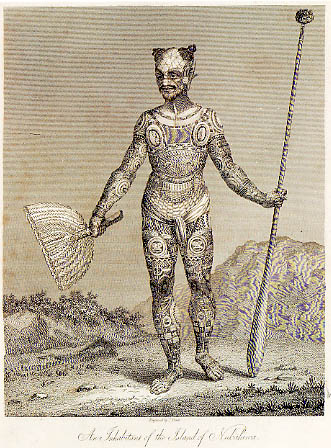
A warrior of Nuku Hiva with a spear and a hand fan by Wilhelm Gottlieb Tilesius von Tilenau, 1813.

The column arrived at their destination on 30 November 1813. The first shots fired occurred after the Tai Pī's attempted to ambush the column; the attack was beaten off. Porter issued a message warning that if the Tai Pī did not cease their resistance at once, he would destroy the villages. After a little while of waiting, the hostiles seemed to ignore the demands so the expedition advanced. An engagement ensued as the villages were burned.

In the end, the Americans and their Te I'i and Happah allies had won at severe cost to the enemy, who sued for peace soon after. The next few months were peaceful until May 1814. The War of 1812 between the United States and the United Kingdom was in its third year and most of the American fleet were captured British privateers. At least six British prisoners were at Nuku Hiva during the American operations against the natives, not including a number who volunteered to fight for Captain Porter.

In December 1813, Porter left Nuku Hiva to continue raiding British whalers. He left behind only nineteen navy sailors and six prisoners under two midshipmen and United States Marine Corps Lieutenant John M. Gamble. On 7 May 1814, a group of the British sailors mutinied, released the six prisoners, and attacked the fort. Gamble was wounded in the foot and taken captive with his remaining men on the converted whaler Seringapatam, though the Americans were set adrift later that day.

Another version, told in the book "The Washington Islands" and given by the head archeologist of French Polynesia, is that Porter and his fleet of three ships (including two captured British ships) came to Taioha'e and made a prison there. Porter sent some of his cannons overland, and took three days to get to Taipivai. He also then had his ships go into Taipivai harbor.

Porter called it a great victory even though the villagers simply left; the chief thought Porter was insane. Porter went back to Taioha'e where he had a prison set up for the British sailors. Porter's men became lax because they were more interested in the village women, enabling the British sailors to break out and make the Americans their prisoners. Soon, the British in turn became lax, and the Americans broke out of the prison and made the British prisoners. The chief had had enough of this behavior and told Porter to get out. Porter complied with this demand and left.

The Americans used an Englishman named Wilson, who lived on the island, as an interpreter; on 9 May he convinced the Te I'i that Porter would not return from his raid, which the natives were not happy about. Wilson eventually persuaded the Te I'is to cancel the alliance and attack. Six American sailors were on the beach at Madisonville at the time; four of the men were killed and one other man escaped wounded with a second survivor. Gamble was alone on Sir Andrew Hammond, one of the captured British ships. While he was still recovering from the wound to his foot, two Te I'i war-canoes attacked the ship. The ship's cannon were already loaded, so Lieutenant Gamble stumbled from one gun to another, firing them as fast as he could. Ultimately, Gamble beat off the enemy attack single-handedly. However, after the deaths of four of his men in town, there was no choice but to abandon the colony with the remaining seven men - all of whom were either wounded or ill. After that, the base was never again occupied by American forces. Captain Porter, who intended to sail back to Nuka Hiva, was captured at the Battle of Valparaíso on 28 March.

Meanwhile, unknown to Porter on 28 August 1814, a Royal Navy flotilla with HMS Briton anchored off Nuku Hiva. They found that Porter had built Fort Madison, Nuku Hiva and a villa on the island, which the natives destroyed after his ship had left. Before his departure, Thomas Staines, with the consent of the local tribes excepting the "Typees" from the Tai Pi Valley, took possession of Nuku Hiva on behalf of the British Crown.

When Porter got back to the US, he went in front of the United States Congress and proudly told Congress that he claimed the Washington Islands as American. Congress was aghast that American sailors would cohabitate with the islanders, leading Congress to decline Porter's claim. Congress didn't want the shame that American sailors would act like that. Some years later, Porter became chief of Mexico's navy.

In 1842, France took possession of the whole group and established a settlement, which was abandoned in 1859.

=== 19th and 20th centuries ===
A ship from Peru captured people from 'Ua Pou and took them back as slaves (see Blackbirding), but as the Catholic Church had converted the islands to Christianity by then, there was a protest and those captives who were still alive were sent back. However, this was a mixed blessing because they brought typhoid fever. A population in excess of 100,000 in 1820 fell to 6,000 in 1872, to 3,000 in 1911 and to a low point of 2,200 in 1927. It seemed that there was no way the Marquesans would survive, but two French doctors toured the islands giving vaccinations and medical care and halted the heavy death toll. Leprosy, however, was still a problem only 20 years ago and elephantiasis is only now almost gone.

=== 21st century ===
An aircraft carrying the then-mayor of Nuku Hiva, Lucien Kimitete, along with MP Boris Léontieff, Mayor of Arue and two other politicians, disappeared in May 2002. Kimitete promoted separation of the Marquesas Islands from French Polynesia within the French Republic, and there was speculation that the disappearances were due to foul play. Many locals still believe this crash was not properly investigated. Since the death of Kimitete, Marquesan political leaders have repeatedly declared themselves in favor of separating from French Polynesia and remaining within the French Republic in case French Polynesian political leaders in Tahiti would proclaim the independence of French Polynesia.

== Media use ==
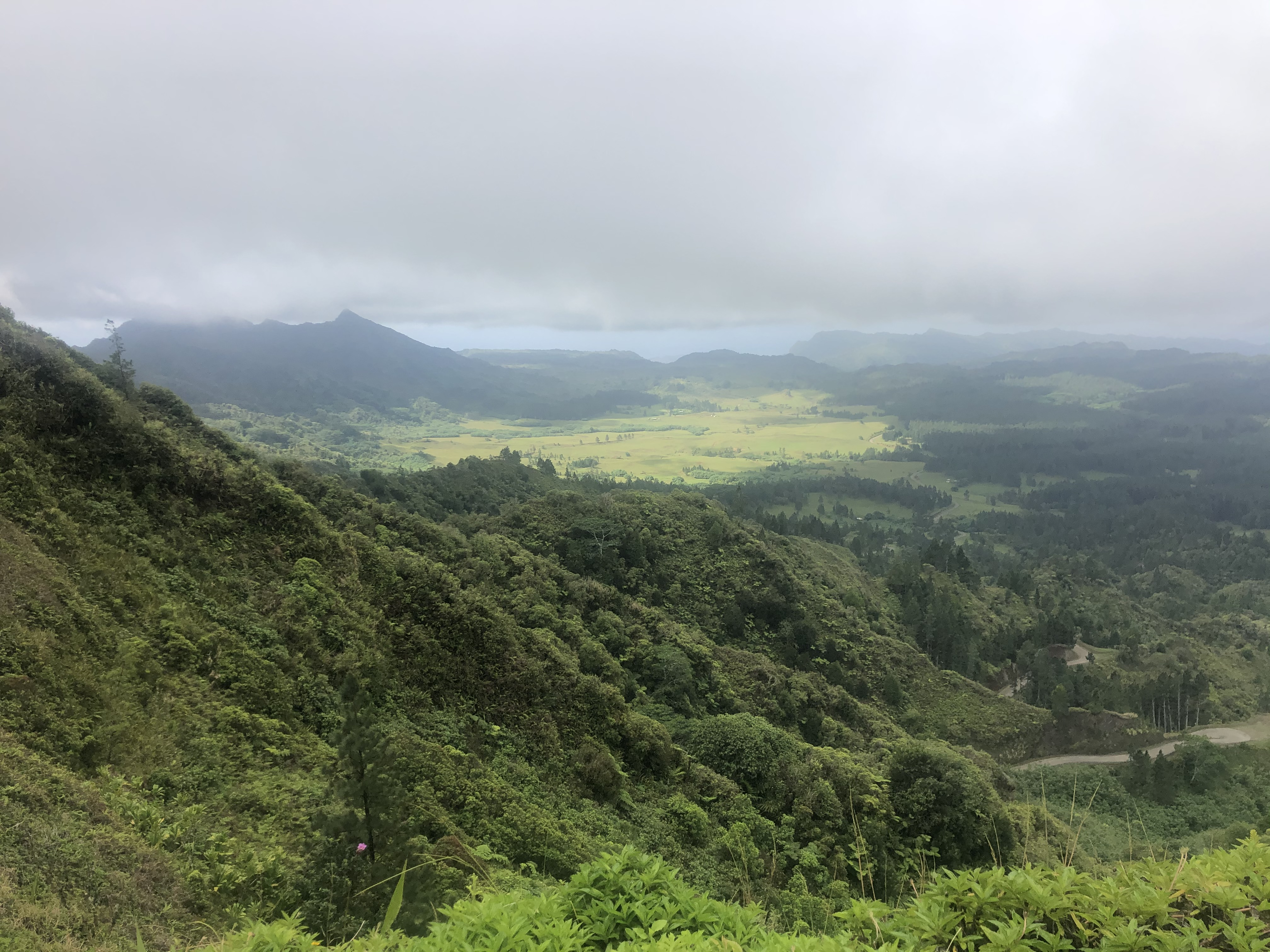
Panoramic view

In 2001, Nuku Hiva was used as the filming location for Survivor: Marquesas, the fourth season of the American reality competition series Survivor, airing in the United States in 2002.

British explorer and presenter Ben Fogle filmed an episode of Ben Fogle: New Lives in the Wild in 2015 with a nomadic couple who reside on a boat, which was moored off Nuku Hiva at the time of his week-long visit. They sailed from the southwest to the northeast.

== In literature ==
Herman Melville's book Typee (1846) is based on the time he spent on the island after deserting the American whaling ship Acushnet in 1842.

In his science fiction novel Paris in the Twentieth Century, written in 1863, Jules Verne describes Nuku Hiva as one of the main stock exchanges of the world of 1960:

Quotations of countless stocks on the international market were automatically inscribed on dials utilized by the Exchanges of Paris, London, Frankfurt, Amsterdam, Turin, Berlin, Vienna, Saint Petersburg, Constantinople, New York, Valparaíso, Calcutta, Sydney, Peking, and Nuku Hiva

— Jules Verne, Paris in the Twentieth Century

Additionally, Jules Verne's "The Floating Island" makes a stop at Nuka-Hiva [sic] where he provides an extensive profile of its occupants, flora, fauna, geography, etc., as known in the late 19th century.

The novel "Thunder from the Sea" (1973) by Willowdean Chatterson Handy is set on Nuku Hiva in the late 18th and early 19th centuries, detailing traditional ways of life and the effects of contact between the islanders and American, British and French 'outsiders'.

== See also ==
- List of volcanoes in French Polynesia
- Overseas France
- Dependent Territory
