= Hakahau =

- Associated commune of Ua-Pou
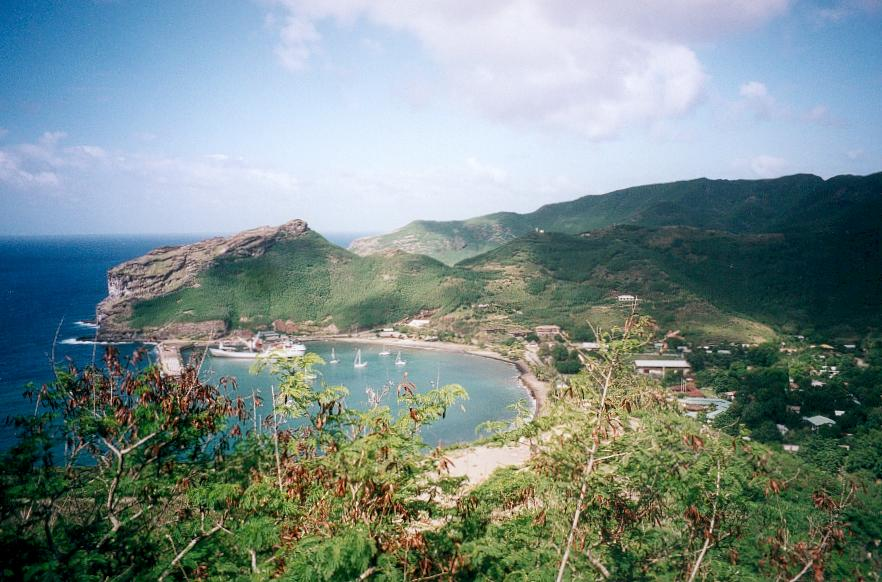

- Location within Marquesas Islands
- Location of Hakahau
- Coordinates: 9°21′40″S 140°2′57″W
- Country: France
- Overseas collectivity: French Polynesia
- Subdivision: Marquesas Islands
- Commune: Ua-Pou
- Area^{1}: 4.333 km^{2} (1.673 sq mi)
- Population (2022): 1,654
  - Density: 381.7/km^{2} (988.7/sq mi)
- Time zone: UTC−10:00
- ^{1} French Land Register data, which excludes lakes, ponds, glaciers > 1 km^{2} (0.386 sq mi or 247 acres) and river estuaries.

Hakahau is the main village and port of the island of Ua Pou, in the Marquesas Islands, northeast of French Polynesia. It is the capital of the municipality. It is located at the bottom of a sheltered bay on the northeast side of the island, and has a sheltered dock by a jetty. The Aranui 3 stops at Hakahau.

== Geography ==
=== Climate ===
Hakahau has a tropical rainforest climate (Köppen Af), close to being classed as a tropical monsoon climate (Am). The average annual temperature in Hakahau is 25.5 °C (77.9 °F). The average annual rainfall is 1,345.5 mm (52.97 in) with March as the wettest month. The temperatures are highest on average in March, at around 26.2 °C (79.2 °F), and lowest in September, at around 25.0 °C (77.0 °F). The highest temperature ever recorded in Hakahau was 32.1 °C (89.8 °F) on 13 April 2007; the coldest temperature ever recorded was 16.2 °C (61.2 °F) on 28 August 1997.

Climate data for Hakahau (1991−2020 normals, extremes 1997−present)
Month	Jan	Feb	Mar	Apr	May	Jun	Jul	Aug	Sep	Oct	Nov	Dec	Year
Record high °C (°F)	31.5 (88.7)	31.7 (89.1)	31.6 (88.9)	32.1 (89.8)	31.6 (88.9)	31.4 (88.5)	30.7 (87.3)	30.7 (87.3)	31.0 (87.8)	31.3 (88.3)	31.4 (88.5)	31.2 (88.2)	32.1 (89.8)
Mean daily maximum °C (°F)	28.6 (83.5)	29.0 (84.2)	29.3 (84.7)	29.4 (84.9)	29.2 (84.6)	28.7 (83.7)	28.2 (82.8)	28.0 (82.4)	28.1 (82.6)	28.4 (83.1)	28.4 (83.1)	28.7 (83.7)	28.7 (83.7)
Daily mean °C (°F)	25.5 (77.9)	25.9 (78.6)	26.2 (79.2)	26.1 (79.0)	26.0 (78.8)	25.6 (78.1)	25.1 (77.2)	25.0 (77.0)	25.0 (77.0)	25.2 (77.4)	25.3 (77.5)	25.5 (77.9)	25.5 (77.9)
Mean daily minimum °C (°F)	22.4 (72.3)	22.9 (73.2)	23.0 (73.4)	22.9 (73.2)	22.8 (73.0)	22.4 (72.3)	22.0 (71.6)	22.0 (71.6)	21.9 (71.4)	22.0 (71.6)	22.2 (72.0)	22.4 (72.3)	22.4 (72.3)
Record low °C (°F)	18.0 (64.4)	19.1 (66.4)	18.1 (64.6)	17.1 (62.8)	17.4 (63.3)	18.0 (64.4)	17.1 (62.8)	16.2 (61.2)	16.4 (61.5)	17.1 (62.8)	17.7 (63.9)	18.4 (65.1)	16.2 (61.2)
Average rainfall mm (inches)	152.5 (6.00)	117.8 (4.64)	186.5 (7.34)	123.2 (4.85)	114.2 (4.50)	108.1 (4.26)	128.2 (5.05)	77.7 (3.06)	64.0 (2.52)	78.3 (3.08)	117.4 (4.62)	77.6 (3.06)	1,345.5 (52.97)
Average rainy days (≥ 1.0 mm)	11.5	11.7	14.0	12.0	12.6	11.5	12.6	10.1	9.4	11.0	11.7	9.0	137.0
Source: Météo-France
