= List of ship launches in 1800 =

Ships listed here are in chronological order within the year 1800.

Date	Ship	Class	Builder	Location	Country	Notes
13 January	Castle Eden	East Indiaman	Pitcher	Northfleet	Great Britain	For British East India Company.
25 January	City of London	East Indiaman	Randall	Rotherhithe	Great Britain	For British East India Company.
27 January	Jason	Penelope-class frigate	George Parsons	Bursledon	Great Britain	For Royal Navy.
30 January	Paragon	Merchantman	Fishburn & Brodick	Whitby	Great Britain	For Mr. Woodcock.
1 March	Dorsetshire	East Indiaman	Barnard	Deptford	Great Britain	For British East India Company.
1 March	Skelton Castle	East Indiaman	Perry, Wells & Gren	Blackwall	Great Britain	For British East India Company.
13 March	Lady Jane Dundas	East Indiaman	Executors of William Cleverley	Gravesend	Great Britain	For British East India Company.
24 March	Duguay-Trouin	Téméraire-class ship of the line		Rochefort	France	For French Navy.
26 March	Courageux	Third rate	Deptford Dockyard	Deptford	Great Britain	For Royal Navy
26 March	Sovereign	West Indiaman	Randall, Gray & Brent	Rotherhithe	Great Britain	For Lock & Co.
29 March	Comet	Merchantman	Thomas Pitcher	Northfleet	Great Britain	For John St Barbe.
1 April	Emmanuil	Aleksandr-class rowing frigate	A. I. Melikhov	Saint Petersburg	Russia	For Imperial Russian Navy.
10 April	Cumberland	West Indiaman	Randall & Brent	Rotherhithe	Great Britain	For Mr. Hodgson.
10 April	President	Frigate	Christian Bergh	East River, New York City	United States	For United States Navy
10 April	Travers	East Indiaman	Perry, Wells & Green	Blackwall	Great Britain	For John Mangles.
24 April	New York	Frigate	Peck and Carpenter	New York City	United States	For United States Navy
April	Rover	Privateer	Snow Parker	Herring Cove	(Kingdom of Great Britain) Nova Scotia	For Snow Parker, Simeon Perkins and William Lawson.
3 May	Zacatie Sviatoi Anny	Third rate	M. Sarychev	Saint Petersburg	Russia	For Imperial Russian Navy.
3 May	Archistratig Mikhail	Third rate	A. S. Katasanov	Saint Petersburg	Russia	For Imperial Russian Navy.
10 May	Spencer	Third rate	Henry Adams	Bucklers Hard	Great Britain	For Royal Navy
8 June	Galatée	Corvette		Honfleur	France	For French Navy.
25 June	Diligent	Vigilant-class brig	Jean Fouache and Enterprise Thibaudier	Havre de Grâce	France	For French Navy.
25 June	Suffolk	Merchantman	Graham	Harwich	Great Britain	For Robertson & Co.
6 July	Aigle	Téméraire-class ship of the line		Rochefort	France	For French Navy.
7 July	William	Merchantman		Bombay Dockyard	India	For private owner.
18 July	Rolla	Merchantman	Temple	South Shields	Great Britain	For Brown & Co.
20 July	Argus	Vigilant-class brig	Jean Fouache and Enterprise Thibaudier	Havre de Grâce	France	For French Navy.
20 July	Vigilant	Vigilant-class sloop		Havre de Grâce	France	For French Navy.
20 July	Observateur	Vigilant-class brig	Jean Fouache and Enterprise Thibaudier	Havre de Grâce	France	For French Navy.
21 July	Nutwell	Merchantman	Jacob Preston	Great Yarmouth	Great Britain	For Heathfield & Co.
22 July	Consolante	Consolante-class frigate		Saint-Malo	France	For French Navy.
25 July	Monarch	Merchantman	Patrick Beatson	Lower Canada	(Kingdom of Great Britain)	For Peter Everitt Mestaer.
3 August	Blagodat	First rate	A. S. Katasanov	Saint Petersburg	Russia	For Imperial Russian Navy.
22 August	Découverte	Découverte-class schooner		Brest	France	For French Navy.
5 September	William Dent	Merchantman	George Brown & William Oliver	Shoreham-by-Sea	Great Britain	For John Atkins.
15 September	Admiraal Zoutman	Wreeker-class ship of the line	R. Dorman	Amsterdam	Batavian Republic	For Batavian Navy.
20 September	Curieux	Corvette	François-Timothée Pestel	Saint-Malo	France	For French Navy.
29 September	Norge	Third rate	Nyholm Dockyard	Copenhagen	Denmark-Norway	For Dano-Norwegian Navy.
29 September	Earl St. Vincent	Merchantman	Robert Davy	Topsham	Great Britain	For T. Hayman.
2 October	Blanche	Apollo-class frigate	John Dudman	Deptford	Great Britain	For Royal Navy.
6 October	Sir John Borlase Warren	Merchantman	Thomas Kenwill	Plymouth	Great Britain	For Noble & Co.
12 October	Nazaret	Fifth rate	M. K. Surovtsov	Kherson	Russia	For Imperial Russian Navy.
12 October	Varakhail	Third rate	V. I. Potapov	Kherson	Russia	For Imperial Russian Navy.
18 October	Ocean	East Indiaman	Thomas Pitcher & Sons	London	Great Britain	For British East India Company.
20 October	Henry Addington	East Indiaman	Wells	Deptford	Great Britain	For British East India Company.
30 October	Uranie	Uranie-class frigate	Pierre de Gay	Nantes	France	For French Navy.
31 October	Clorinde	Uranie-class frigate	Pierre de Gay	Nantes	France	For French Navy.
3 November	Windham	East Indiaman	Perry, Wells & Green	Blackwall Yard	Great Britain	For British East India Company.
11 November	Friderichssteen	Fifth rate	Frantz Hohlenberg	Copenhagen	Denmark-Norway	For Dano-Norwegian Navy.
17 November	Fortunee	Phoebe-class frigate	John Perry	Blackwall Yard	Great Britain	For Royal Navy.
17 November	Iagudiil	First rate	M. K. Surovtsov	Kherson	Russia	For Imperial Russian Navy.
18 November	Leda	Leda-class frigate	Edward Sison	Chatham Dockyard	Great Britain	For Royal Navy.
21 November	Sir Edward Hamilton	Merchantman	Peter Everitt Mestaer	Rotherhithe	Great Britain	For private owner.
2 December	Cato	East Indiaman	Thomas Haw	Stockton-on-Tees	Great Britain	For British East India Company.
17 December	Star	Merchantman	John Bannister Hudson	Calcutta	India	For private owner.
30 December	Advice	Express-class schooner	John Randall & Co.	Rotherhithe	Great Britain	For Royal Navy.
30 December	Express	Express-class schooner	John Randall & Co.	Rotherhithe	Great Britain	For Royal Navy.
Unknown date	Aberdeen Packet	Sloop	Nicholas Bools & William Good	Bridport	Great Britain	For Catto & Co.
Unknown date	Albion	Merchantman	Obadiah Ayles	Topsham	Great Britain	For J. Hayman.
Unknown date	Albion	Merchantman	Nicholson, Horn & Blenkinsop	South Shields	Great Britain	For private owner.
Unknown date	Albion	West Indiaman		Whitehaven	Great Britain	For private owner.
Unknown date	Albion Packet	Schooner	Gowan	Berwick upon Tweed	Great Britain	For Old Shipping Co.
Unknown date	Alert	Lugger	Nicholas Bools & William Good	Bridport	Great Britain	For John Horsforth and others.
Unknown date	Alonzo	Sloop		South Shields	Great Britain	For Mr. Brown.
Unknown date	Anacreon	Merchantman		Sunderland	Great Britain	For Mr. Davidson.
Unknown date	Argument	Sloop		Sydney	(Kingdom of Great Britain) New South Wales	For private owner.
Unknown date	Autumn	Sloop	Ann Brodick	South Shields	Great Britain	For Mr. Brodrick.
Unknown date	Beschutter	Full-rigged ship		Dunkerque	France	For Batavian Navy.
Unknown date	Betsey	Merchantman		Bristol	Great Britain	For Hugh Duncan Baillie, James Evan Baillie, Robert Bush, James Elton, John Elton and William Elton.
Unknown date	Blanche	Apollo-class frigate		Deptford Dockyard	Great Britain	For Royal Navy
Unknown date	Brak	Full-rigged ship		Rotterdam	Batavian Republic	For Batavian Navy.
Unknown date	Byam	Snow			Great Britain	For Stevenson & others.
Unknown date	Caesar	West Indiaman	Brent	River Thames	Great Britain	For R. Dale.
Unknown date	Canada	Merchantman	F. Hurry & Co.	South Shields	Great Britain	For F. Hurry & Co.
Unknown date	Caroline	Merchantman		Philadelphia, Pennsylvania	United States	For private owner.
Unknown date	Caroline	West Indiaman		Ipswich	Great Britain	For R. Neave.
Unknown date	Chatham	Chatham-class ship of the line	Glavin	Rotterdam	Batavian Republic	For Batavian Navy.
Unknown date	Circe	full-rigged ship		Rotterdam	Batavian Republic	For Batavian Navy.
Unknown date	Clothier	Brig		Barmouth	Great Britain	For D. Edward & Co.
Unknown date	Comet	Merchantman		Topsham	Great Britain	For Mr. Lyall. Renamed HMS Spy in 1804.
Unknown date	Confiance	Schooner			United States	For private owner.
Unknown date	Darlington	Merchantman		Sunderland	Great Britain	For private owner.
Unknown date	Dasher	Slave ship		Bideford	Great Britain	For Thomas Phillips.
Unknown date	Diadem	Barque	Chapman and Campion	Whitby	Great Britain	For Aarone, Edward and Robert Chapman.
Unknown date	Diana	Cutter	Nicholas Bools & William Good	Bridport	Great Britain	For Thomas Robillards and others.
Unknown date	Doris	Merchantman	John & Philip Laing	Sunderland	Great Britain	For private owner.
Unknown date	Duke of Clarence	Merchantman		Plymouth	Great Britain	For Ingram & others.
Unknown date	Elizabeth	Merchantman	William Naylor Wright	Liverpool	Great Britain	For private owner.
Unknown date	Elizabeth	sloop	Nicholas Bools & William Good	Bridport	Great Britain	For Mr. Warren.
Unknown date	Experiment	Merchantman	Gillett & Co.	Calcutta	India	For Gillett & Co.
Unknown date	Fifeshire Packet	Smack	Nicholas Bools & William Good	Bridport	Great Britain	For Union Shipping Co.
Unknown date	Fortune	Privateer		Bordeaux	France	For private owner.
Unknown date	Friends	West Indiaman		Ipswich	Great Britain	For W. Thurlby.
Unknown date	Gannet	Sloop-of-war	Thomas King	Dover	Great Britain	For Royal Navy.
Unknown date	Gonets	Vestnik-class cutter	A. I. Melikhov	Saint Petersburg	Russia	For Imperial Russian Navy.
Unknown date	Governor Milne	Merchantman		Quebec	(Kingdom of Great Britain) Upper Canada	For private owner.
Unknown date	Greenwich	Whaler		River Thames	Great Britain	For Samuel Enderby & Sons.
Unknown date	Haai	Full-rigged ship		Rotterdam	Batavian Republic	For Batavian Navy.
Unknown date	Harmonie	Privateer			France	For private owner.
Unknown date	Hind	Merchantman		Hull	Great Britain	For Foster & Co.
Unknown date	Hope	Merchantman	John & Philip Laing	Sunderland	Great Britain	For Francis Vasic.
Unknown date	Hope	Full-rigged ship		Calcutta	India	For private owner.
Unknown date	Horatio	Slave ship		Liverpool	Great Britain	For J. Bolton .
Unknown date	Horsel	Full-rigged ship{		Rotterdam	Batavian Republic	For Batavian Navy.
Unknown date	Huri-yı Bahri	Fifth rate			Ottoman Empire	For Ottoman Navy.
Unknown date	Id-i Nusret	Sixth rate			Ottoman Empire	For Ottoman Navy.
Unknown date	Irlam	West Indiaman		Liverpool	Great Britain	For Irlam & Co.
Unknown date	Kenau Hasselaar	Frigate	P. Glavimans	Rotterdam	Batavian Republic	For Batavian Navy.
Unknown date	Kitty	West Indiaman			Great Britain	For Miller & Co.
Unknown date	Knorhaan	Full-rigged ship		Rotterdam	Batavian Republic	For Batavian Navy.
Unknown date	Krekel	Full-rigged ship			Batavian Republic	For Batavian Navy.
Unknown date	Leander	Sloop	Simon Temple	South Shields	Great Britain	For A M'Gale & Co.
Unknown date	La Guapachin	Privateer		Bayonne	France	For Private owner.
Unknown date	Margaret	Merchantman	John & Philip Laing	Sunderland	Great Britain	For E. Gray.
Unknown date	Marian	Merchantman		Calcutta	India	For Lambert & Co.
Unknown date	Maria Reijersbergen	Fifth rate		Amsterdam	Batavian Republic	For Batavian Navy.
Unknown date	Marquis Cornwallis	Frigate		Bombay	India	For British East India Company.
Unknown date	Minerve	Privateer			France	For private owner.
Unknown date	Ørnen	Schooner		Copenhagen	Denmark-Norway	For Dano-Norwegian Navy.
Unknown date	Nautilus	Submarine	Robert Fulton	Rouen	France	For Robert Fulton.
Unknown date	Nautilus	Brig	T. Nicholson & Co.	Sunderland	Great Britain	For private owner.
Unknown date	Osnaburg	Sloop	Nicholas Bools & William Good	Bridport	Great Britain	For Dundee Shipping Co.
Unknown date	Paragon	Merchantman		Liverpool	Great Britain	For Earle & Co.
Unknown date	Premier Consul	Privateer		Nantes	France	For private owner.
Unknown date	Rob	Full-rigged ship		Rotterdam	Batavian Republic	For Batavian Navy.
Unknown date	Robert	West Indiaman		Newcastle upon Tyne	Great Britain	For Baring & Co.
Unknown date	Sarah Ann	West Indiaman		Newcastle upon Tyne	Great Britain	For Dawson & Co.
Unknown date	Sir Andrew Hammond	West Indiaman		Bermuda	(Kingdom of Great Britain) Bermuda	For R. Sheedan.
Unknown date	Sportsman	Schooner	Nicholas Bools & William Good	Bridport	Great Britain	For M. Stanton.
Unknown date	Swan	Merchantman		Greenock	Great Britain	For Hamilton & Co.
Unknown date	Sylvan	Snow		Gateshead	Great Britain	For A. Hood.
Unknown date	Theseus	Merchantman	John & Philip Laing	Sunderland	Great Britain	For John & Philip Laing.
Unknown date	Tiger	West Indiaman		Liverpool	Great Britain	For W. Goore.
Unknown date	Townshend Packet	Packet ship		Falmouth	Great Britain	For Post Office Packet Service.
Unknown date	Trident	Third rate		Barcelona	Spain	For Spanish Navy.
Unknown date	Trumbull	Sloop-of-war	Howard & Allyn Naval Agency	Norwich, Connecticut	United States	For United States Navy.
Unknown date	Vestnik	Vestnik-class cutter	A. I. Melikhov	Saint Petersburg	Russia	For Imperial Russian Navy.
Unknown date	Vingança	Cutter			Portugal	For Portuguese Navy.
Unknown date	Westmoreland	West Indiaman		Whitby	Great Britain	For R. Walker.
Unknown date	William	Full-rigged ship		Bombay	India	For private owner.
Unknown date	William Heathcote	Slave ship		Liverpool	Great Britain	For Mr. Neelson.
Unknown date	Zeemeeuw	Full-rigged ship			Batavian Republic	For Batavian Navy.
Unknown date	Zü'l Ikab	Sixth rate			Ottoman Empire	For Ottoman Navy.
Unknown date	Name unknown	Brig		Batavia	(Batavian Republic) Netherlands East Indies	For Batavian Navy.
Unknown date	Name unknown	Brig			United States	For Private owner.
Unknown date	Name unknown	Merchantman			Viceroyalty of New Spain	For private owner.
Unknown date	Name unknown	Snow		New Providence, New Jersey	United States	For private owner.
Unknown date	Name unknown	Merchantman		Massachusetts	United States	For private owner.
Unknown date	Name unknown	Brig			Spain	For private owner.
