= List of ships named Albion =

Albion is the name of many "Age of Sail" merchant ships of the United Kingdom, named for Albion.

Ships named Albion include:

== Merchant ships ==
- Albion (1762 EIC ship) was launched in 1762 for the British East India Company. She made one complete voyage for the EIC before wrecking at the outset of her second voyage.
- Albion (1783 ship) was launched at Liverpool, made two slave trading voyages from there, and then made two slave trading voyages from Bristol; her crew abandoned her in 1793 on the homeward bound leg of her fourth voyage. She drifted to the North American coast where some Americans found and salvaged her.
- Albion (1787 EIC ship) was launched in 1787 for the EIC, for whom she made eight voyages until she was sold in 1810 to the government for use as a troopship. She was lost at sea in 1816.
- Albion (1792 ship) was launched at Newcastle upon Tyne in 1792 and made one voyage for the EIC under charter. In 1799 she transferred to India.
- Albion was launched at Sunderland in 1797. The Royal Navy purchased her in 1798 for service as the sloop HMS Albion. The Navy sold her at Sheerness in 1803. She became a transport. It is possible that she foundered in August 1808.
- Albion (1798 whaler) was a whaler built at Deptford, England, and launched in 1798. She made five whaling voyages to the seas around New South Wales and New Zealand. The government chartered her in 1803 to transport stores and cattle to Risdon Cove on the River Derwent, Tasmania. She was last listed in 1825.
- Albion (1800 ship) was launched at Topsham in 1800. She spent almost her entire career trading between London and Jamaica until she was condemned at Charleston in 1816.
- Albion Packet (1800 ship) was a schooner launched at Berwick by Gowan. She sailed primarily along Britain's coasts, and later to the Baltic. She disappeared from the registers between 1816 and 1822, when she reappeared as Albion. Circa 1827 she became Albion Packet again. She underwent two maritime mishaps, one in August 1802 and one circa December 1827, before being wrecked on 17 November 1832 near Orford High Light.
- Albion (1800 Whitehaven ship) was a West Indiaman. She was the fourth (and last) ship to sail under Gregor Macgregor's ill-conceived and ill-fated Poyais scheme and wrecked after delivering her supplies to Belize.
- Albion was reportedly launched at Shields in 1800 as a merchantman. The British Royal Navy purchased her in 1803, commissioned her as HMS Prospero, and fitted her out as a bomb vessel; she was wrecked, with the loss of almost her entire crew, in February 1807.
- Albion (1804 ship) was launched at Shields in 1801, probably under another name. She first appeared as Albion in 1804. Her crew abandoned her at sea in 1807.
- Albion (1805 ship) was launched in 1805 at Calcutta. A fire destroyed her at Canton in 1807.
- Albion (1813 ship) was launched in 1813 at Bristol, England. She made three voyages transporting convicts to New South Wales. She also traded with Jamaica, India, and Quebec. For two of the voyages to India she was an "extra" ship (i.e. under charter) to the EIC.
- Albion (1814 ship) was launched in 1814 at Calcutta; she wrecked off Trincomalee in 1817 whilst sailing from Bombay to London.
- Albion, a ship of the Black Ball Line (trans-Atlantic packet), wrecked off the coast of Ireland, near Kinsale, in 1822.
- Albion (steamboat), which ran on Puget Sound, Washington, US, from 1898 to 1924
- Albion (wherry), an 1898 trading vessel, then a lighter, now preserved by the Norfolk Wherry Trust

== Naval ships ==
- HMS Albion, the name of several Royal Navy ships
- Hired armed cutter Albion
- Albion-class ship of the line (1763)
- Albion-class ship of the line (1842)
