= List of shipwrecks in September 1824 =

The list of shipwrecks in September 1824 includes some ships sunk, foundered, grounded, or otherwise lost during September 1824.

== 1 September ==
List of shipwrecks: 1 September 1824
Ship	State	Description
Favorite	United Kingdom	The ship was driven ashore and wrecked near Youghall, County Cork. She was on a voyage from Waterford to Cork.

== 2 September ==
List of shipwrecks: 2 September 1824
Ship	State	Description
Caren	Sweden	The ship foundered off Gotland. Her crew were rescued. She was on a voyage from Trelleborg to Gävle.

== 3 September ==
List of shipwrecks: 3 September 1824
Ship	State	Description
Andromaque	France	The ship was driven ashore in the Garonne. She was on a voyage from Mauritius and Île Bourbon to Bordeaux, Gironde.

== 4 September ==
List of shipwrecks: 4 September 1824
Ship	State	Description
Frankfort	Hamburg	The ship was driven ashore at Spurn Point, Yorkshire, United Kingdom. She was on a voyage from Hamburg to Hull, Yorkshire.

== 6 September ==
List of shipwrecks: 6 September 1824
Ship	State	Description
Commerce	United Kingdom	The ship was wrecked on the Threedlethorp Knowl, in the North Sea off the coast of Yorkshire. Her crew were rescued.

== 8 September ==
List of shipwrecks: 8 September 1824
Ship	State	Description
Ann	United Kingdom	The ship was driven ashore 3 nautical miles (5.6 km) south of Sunderland, County Durham.
Archibald	United Kingdom	The ship ran aground on the Herring Ledge, off Saint John, New Brunswick, British North America and was severely damaged.
Bonetta	United Kingdom	The sloop was driven ashore in Major's Bay, Saint Kitts.
Catharine	Hamburg	The ship was driven ashore near Cuxhaven. She was on a voyage from Hamburg to Hull, Yorkshire, United Kingdom.
Dart	United Kingdom	The sloop was driven ashore on Basseterre.
Outhwaite	United Kingdom	The brig struck the pier at Whitby, Yorkshire and sank. Her crew were rescued.
Señora dos Martyres	Spain	The ship was driven ashore and sank at Dunany Point, County Louth, United Kingdom. She was on a voyage from St. Ubes to Dundalk, County Louth.

== 9 September ==
List of shipwrecks: 9 September 1824
Ship	State	Description
Asia	United Kingdom	The ship was driven ashore and wrecked at Faial Island, Azores. She was on a voyage from Rio de Janeiro, Brazil to Faial Island.
Margaret and Ann	United Kingdom	The ship foundered in the North Sea off the coast of Yorkshire. Her crew were rescued by Jean (United Kingdom).
Mosca	United Kingdom	The ship capsized off the Ortiz Bank with the loss of all twenty people on board.

== 11 September ==
List of shipwrecks: 11 September 1824
Ship	State	Description
Brothers	United Kingdom	The ship struck a rock and sank off Cape Wrath, Caithness. Her crew were rescued by Catharine (United Kingdom). Brothers was on a voyage from Wick, Caithness to Belfast, County Antrim.

== 13 September ==
List of shipwrecks: 13 September 1824
Ship	State	Description
Albion	United Kingdom	The ship capsized in the Atlantic Ocean with the loss of two of her crew. Some of the survivors were rescued by John and Mary (United Kingdom), but six were left on the wreck when a line parted. Albion was on a voyage from British Honduras to London. She later came ashore on St. Catherines Island, Georgia, United States and the remainder of her crew were rescued.

== 14 September ==
List of shipwrecks: 14 September 1824
Ship	State	Description
Brothers	(United Kingdom of Great Britain and Ireland) Bahamas	The sloop was abandoned off the Bahamas.
Catharina Elizabeth	Netherlands	The ship was beached at Winterton-on-Sea, Norfolk, United Kingdom. She was on a voyage from Riga, Russian Empire to Amsterdam, North Holland. Catherina Elizabeth was refloated the next day and taken in to Great Yarmouth, Norfolk.
Ceres	United Kingdom	The ship was wrecked with the loss of all but two of her crew. She was on a voyage from British Honduras to London.
Edward Douglas	United States	The ship was wrecked on Long Island, New York. She was on a voyage from New York City to Aux Cayes, Haiti.
Hope	United Kingdom	The schooner was driven ashore in the Caicos Islands.
Industry	United Kingdom	The ship was driven ashore at Carrickfergus, County Antrim. She was on a voyage from Donaghadee, County Down to Workington, Cumberland.
Maria Bartlett	United Kingdom	The sloop was wrecked in the Caicos Islands.
Mary	(United Kingdom of Great Britain and Ireland) British North America	The ship was wrecked on the coast of New York. Her crew were rescued.
Sarah	United Kingdom	The ship was wrecked in the Atlantic Ocean with the loss of all but two of her crew. The survivors were rescued by Mars (United Kingdom). Sarah was on a voyage from British Honduras to London.
Termagant	United Kingdom	The ship was driven ashore at Carrickfergus. She was on a voyage from Donaghadee to Workington.
Widow's Son	(United Kingdom of Great Britain and Ireland) Bahamas	The sloop was driven ashore on the Ship Channel Keys.
Wilding	United Kingdom	The ship sprang a leak and capsized at Charleston, South Carolina with the loss of three of her crew. The survivors were rescued by the pilot boat Friends (United States).

== 15 September ==
List of shipwrecks: 15 September 1824
Ship	State	Description
Augusta	United States	The full-rigged ship was driven ashore on McAlpin's Island, Georgia.
Emperor	United States	The full-rigged ship was driven ashore in Musgrove Creek, Georgia.
Caroline ann	United States	The ship was driven ashore south of Savannah, Georgia.
Governor Hopkins	United States	The ship was driven ashore in Musgrove Creek.
Matilda	United States	The full-rigged ship was driven ashore in the Savannah River.

== 16 September ==
List of shipwrecks: 16 September 1824
Ship	State	Description
Edward	United States	The ship was wrecked on the Chico Bank, in the Atlantic Ocean off the coast of Argentina. Her crew were rescued.
Hebe	(United Kingdom of Great Britain and Ireland) Guernsey	The brig sprang a leak and foundered in the Atlantic Ocean. She was on a voyage from Philadelphia, Pennsylvania to Wilmington, North Carolina, United States.

== 18 September ==
List of shipwrecks: 18 September 1824
Ship	State	Description
Stockton Packet	United Kingdom	The ship was driven ashore and wrecked at Collieston, Aberdeenshire. Her crew were rescued. She was on a voyage from Newcastle upon Tyne, Northumberland to Liverpool, Lancashire.

== 19 September ==
List of shipwrecks: 19 September 1824
Ship	State	Description
Nancy	United States	The ship was destroyed by fire at Gibraltar.

== 20 September ==
List of shipwrecks: 20 September 1824
Ship	State	Description
Lively	United Kingdom	The ship was driven ashore and wrecked near Cardigan. Her crew were rescued. She was on a voyage from Aberystwyth, Cardiganshire to Cardigan.
HMS Medina	Royal Navy	The Cyrus-class post ship struck a rock at Smyrna, Ottoman Empire and was beached. She was subsequently refloated and taken to Athens, Greece to be repaired and returned to service.
Two Friends	United Kingdom	The ship was wrecked on the north coast of Boa Vista, Cape Verde Islands. Her crew were rescued. She was on a voyage from Gibraltar to Bahia, Brazil.

== 21 September ==
List of shipwrecks: 21 September 1824
Ship	State	Description
Enigkeit	Flag unknown	The ship sprang a leak and was abandoned in the English Channel off Start Point, Devon. She was on a voyage from Dartmouth, Devon to San Sebastián, Spain.
Friends	United Kingdom	The ship foundered off Poor Head, County Cork. She was on a voyage from Dungarvan, County Antrim to Cork.
Lively	United Kingdom	The sloop foundered off Cardigan. Her crew were rescued. She was on a voyage from Aberystwyth, Cardiganshire to Carmarthen.

== 22 September ==
List of shipwrecks: 22 September 1824
Ship	State	Description
Adelheid	Stettin	The ship was driven ashore at "Kluin Strand", Jutland. She was on a voyage from Stettin to Havre de Grâce, Seine-Inférieure, France.
Alfred	United Kingdom	The ship was abandoned in the Atlantic Ocean 60 nautical miles (110 km) off Cape Race, Newfoundland, British North America. Her crew were rescued by Dispatch (United Kingdom). She was on a voyage from Quebec City, Lower Canada, British North America to London. Alfred came ashore at "Le Malen", Newfoundland on 28 September.
Vrow Wickgardina	Netherlands	The ship was driven ashore and wrecked at Hunstanton, Norfolk, United Kingdom. She was on a voyage from Antwerp to Leith, Lothian, United Kingdom.

== 23 September ==
List of shipwrecks: 23 September 1824
Ship	State	Description
Achille	France	The ship was driven ashore and wrecked near Fécamp, Seine-Inférieure. She was on a voyage from Saint Petersburg, Russia to Havre de Grâce, Seine-Inférieure.
Diana	United Kingdom	The ship ran aground on the Spit of Hoyle, in Liverpool Bay and was damaged. She was on a voyage from Liverpool, Lancashire to Saint John, New Brunswick, British North America. Diana was refloated the next day and put back to Liverpool.
Rambler	United Kingdom	The ship was driven ashore and wrecked on the Rudder Isles, in the Sound of Mull. She was on a voyage from Arkhangelsk, Russia to Wigton, Cumberland.

== 24 September ==
List of shipwrecks: 24 September 1824
Ship	State	Description
Barkworth	United Kingdom	On 29 September 1824, off the Cape Verde Islands, Cumberland (United Kingdom) spoke with Barkworth, which was bound for Bombay, India. Cumberland arrived at Rio de Janeiro 20 October, but Barkworth was never heard from again. She was presumed to have foundered in the Atlantic Ocean with the loss of all on board.
Nautilus	United Kingdom	The ship was abandoned in the Atlantic Ocean. Her crew were rescued by Brighton (United Kingdom). Nautilus was on a voyage from Miramichi, New Brunswick, British North America to Plymouth, Devon.

== 25 September ==
List of shipwrecks: 25 September 1824
Ship	State	Description
Hannah	United Kingdom	The ship was abandoned in the Atlantic Ocean. Her crew rescued by Quebec Packet (United Kingdom). Hannah was on a voyage from St. Ubes, Portugal to Copenhagen, Denmark.

== 26 September ==
List of shipwrecks: 26 September 1824
Ship	State	Description
Ann	Hamburg	The ship was wrecked on Scharhörn, Hamburg. She was on a voyage from Rostock to Hamburg.
Brothers	United Kingdom	The ship foundered off "Loggan". Her crew were rescued.
Goede Hoop	Netherlands	The ship was wrecked on the east end of Terschelling, Friesland. Her crew were rescued. She was on a voyage from Dram, Norway to Amsterdam, North Holland.
Hyperion	Netherlands	The ship departed from Surinam for a Dutch port. No further trace, presumed foundered with the loss of all hands.
Trafalgar	United Kingdom	The ship was sighted in the Øresund on this date whilst on a voyage from Liverpool, Lancashire to Narva, Russia. No further trace, presumed foundered in the Baltic Sea with the loss of all hands.

== 27 September ==
List of shipwrecks: 27 September 1824
Ship	State	Description
Atlas	United Kingdom	The ship ran aground and was wrecked in the Hog Creek, a tributary of the Hooghly River.
Bombay Merchant	United Kingdom	The East Indiaman sprang a leak and was abandoned in the Atlantic Ocean. Emma (United Kingdom) rescued all on board. Bombay Merchant was on a voyage from Bombay, India to London.
Carl Johan	United States	The ship was driven ashore at Punta Mala, Spain. She was on a voyage from New Orleans, Louisiana to Gibraltar. Carl Johan was refloated on 30 September.
Helen	United Kingdom	The sloop was driven ashore and severely damaged at Stornoway, Isle of Lewis, Outer Hebrides. She was refloated the next day. Helen was on a voyage from Liverpool, Lancashire to Wick, Caithness.
Mercurius	Rostock	The ship was wrecked on Møn, Denmark. She was on a voyage from Rostock to London, United Kingdom.
Two Brothers	United Kingdom	The ship sank at Liverpool, Lancashire.
Union	United Kingdom	The polacre brig was driven ashore and wrecked at Nuevitas, Cuba.
William	United Kingdom	The full-rigged ship was driven ashore at Sand Point, New Brunswick, British North America.

== 28 September ==
List of shipwrecks: 28 September 1824
Ship	State	Description
Caledonia	United Kingdom	The brig was lost in Miramichi Bay. Her crew were rescued.
Engelina	Grand Duchy of Oldenburg	The ship sprang a leak in the North Sea and was beached at Theddlethorpe, Lincolnshire, where she was wrecked. She was on a voyage from Carolinensiel to Hull, Yorkshire, United Kingdom.
Favorite	United Kingdom	The ship was wrecked on the Haisborough Sands, in the North Sea off the coast of Norfolk. Her crew were rescued.
Lee	United Kingdom	The ship was lost in Miramichi May. Her crew were rescued.
Sally	United Kingdom	The ship was lost in Miramichi Bay. Her crew were rescued.
True Friends	(United Kingdom of Great Britain and Ireland) British North America	The brig was driven ashore and wrecked on Prince Edward Island. All on board were rescued. She was on a voyage from Quebec City, Lower Canada to Halifax, Nova Scotia.
Ulysses	United Kingdom	The ship was driven ashore in Miramichi Bay. She was later refloated.

== 29 September ==
List of shipwrecks: 29 September 1824
Ship	State	Description
Aurora	United Kingdom	The ship was wrecked on the coast of Newfoundland, British North America. Her crew were rescued. She was on a voyage from Quebec City, Lower Canada, British North America to Tralee. County Kerry.
Reynolds	United Kingdom	The brig was wrecked off Castletown, Isle of Man with the loss of all ten of her crew. She was on a voyage from Dublin to Liverpool, Lancashire.
Standigheten	Sweden	The ship was driven ashore at Klintehamn.
West Indian	United Kingdom	The ship was run aground off "Michescar". She was on a voyage from Saint Petersburg, Russia to London. West Indian was refloated on 2 October and taken in to "Michescar" for repairs.

== 30 September ==
List of shipwrecks: 30 September 1824
Ship	State	Description
Brothers	United Kingdom	The ship was driven ashore and wrecked at Carlingford, County Louth. She was on a voyage from Dublin to Liverpool, Lancashire.
Gosport	United Kingdom	The ship struck a rock near Trondheim, Norway and sank. She was on a voyage from Arkhangelsk, Russia to Shoreham-by-Sea, Sussex. She was refloated on 13 November and taken in to Trondheim, where she was declared not worth repairing.
Star	United Kingdom	The ship ran aground at Dublin.

== Unknown date ==
List of shipwrecks: Unknown date in September 1824
Ship	State	Description
Aimee	France	The ship was lost whilst on a voyage from Bayonne, Basses-Pyrénées to Auray, Morbihan.
Albert	United Kingdom	The ship was driven ashore and wrecked in the Abaco Islands. She was on a voyage from Gibraltar to Tampico, Mexico.
Baroness van der Capellan	Netherlands	The ship ran aground whilst on a voyage from Batavia, Netherlands East Indies to Antwerp. She put into Bencoolen to unload and then returned to Batavia for repairs, but was declared a total loss.
Columbus	United Kingdom	The ship was driven ashore on the Maniconagan Shoals, British North America before 16 September. She was on a voyage from Quebec City, Lower Canada to London. Columbus had been refloated by 1 October and resumed her voyage.
Hebe	(United Kingdom of Great Britain and Ireland) Guernsey	The ship was wrecked at Cape Fear, North Carolina, United States. Her crew were rescued. She was on a voyage from Philadelphia, Pennsylvania to Wilmington, North Carolina.
Hunter	United States	The ship was driven ashore at Cape May, Delaware. Her crew were rescued. She was on a voyage from Havre de Grâce, Seine-Inférieure, France to Philadelphia, Pennsylvania.
Mars	United Kingdom	The ship was driven ashore near Tracadie, New Brunswick, British North America.
Otus	Sweden	The ship was driven ashore and wrecked at Pillau, Prussia. Her crew were rescued.
Pilgrim	United Kingdom	The ship was severely damaged in Miramichi Bay.
Rebecca	(United Kingdom of Great Britain and Ireland) British North America	The schooner was abandoned off Newport, Newfoundland. Her crew were rescued.
