= HMS Advice =

Eight ships of the Royal Navy have borne the name HMS Advice:

- English ship Advice (1586) was a 9-gun full-rigged pinnace launched in 1586 and sold in 1617.
- English ship Advice (1650) was a 40-gun fourth rate Elizabeth-class frigate launched in 1650. Rebuilt, but not lengthened, in 1698 with 48/42 guns, she was captured by French privateers on 27 June 1711 off Great Yarmouth.
- HMS Advice (1712) was a 50-gun fourth rate launched in 1712. She was renamed HMS Milford in 1744, and was sold in 1749.
- HMS Advice (1745) was a 50-gun fourth rate launched in 1745, and broken up in 1756.
- HMS Advice (1779) was a 10-gun cutter purchased in 1779, and wrecked in 1793.
- HMS Advice (1796) was a 4-gun cutter launched in 1796 and last listed in 1799.
- HMS Advice (1800) was an advice boat launched in 1800 and sold in 1805.
- HMS Advice (1837) was a paddle packet ship launched for the GPO as Vixen in 1823. She was transferred to the Navy in 1837 and was sold in 1870.

== See also ==
- HMS Advice Prize
