= Thames (1805 ship) =

Whaler 1805 to 1826

History

United Kingdom
- Launched: 1804
- Acquired: 1805 by purchase of a Spanish prize
- Fate: Ceased sailing after her return to London in October 1826

General characteristics
- Tons burthen: Originally: 298 (bm); Post lengthening (1811): 377, or 380 (bm)
- Complement: 26
- Armament: 1805: 10 × 6&4&3-pounder guns + 2 swivel guns; 1810: 4 × 6-pounder + 6 × 4-pounder guns

Thames was a Spanish vessel launched in 1804, almost certainly under a different name, and captured circa 1805. She became a whaler, making eight whaling voyages between 1805 and 1826 to the southern whale fishery. Although the registers carried Thames for some years after her return from her eighth voyage, there is no evidence that she ever sailed again.

== Career ==
W. Mellish purchased Thames and she would go on to make eight whaling voyages for him. There is some confusion among sources as to the vessel. Once source describes her as having been built in Rotherhithe in 1804, but another source points out that other than the name and the name of a master, John Hemmons, there is no further evidence for this vessel.

1st whaling voyage (1805–1808): Captain Charles Gardner acquired a letter of marque on 30 September 1805. He sailed on 10 October 1805 in company with Star, James Birnie, master, and William and Elizabeth, J.Coffin, master. They separated from each other a little later. Thames sailed via Porto Santo (1 November), Palma (5 November), Isle of Mayo (11 November), and St Catherine's (off the coast of Brazil. In February 1807, some men were mutinous, but she rounded Cape Horn and fished off the coast of South America, being reported having been "all well" in March 1807. In 1807 Thames, Charles Gardner, was one of only two British whalers to have visited Easter Island before 1812. She returned to England on 2 January 1808, having taken 57 whales.

Thames first appeared in Lloyd's Register in 1808.

Year	Master	Owner	Trade	Source
1808	Bowerman	W.Mellish	London–Southern Fishery	LR

2nd whaling voyage (1808–1811): Captain Joseph Bowman (or Bowerman), sailed from England on 11 March 1808, bound for the waters off Peru. Thames was reported to have been on the coast of Peru in December 1809, "all well" on 27 March 1810, and off Peru in September 1810. She returned to England on 13 February 1811.

3rd whaling voyage (1811–1813): Captain Andrew Bristow acquired a letter of marque against America. He sailed from England on 8 June 1811, bound for New Zealand.

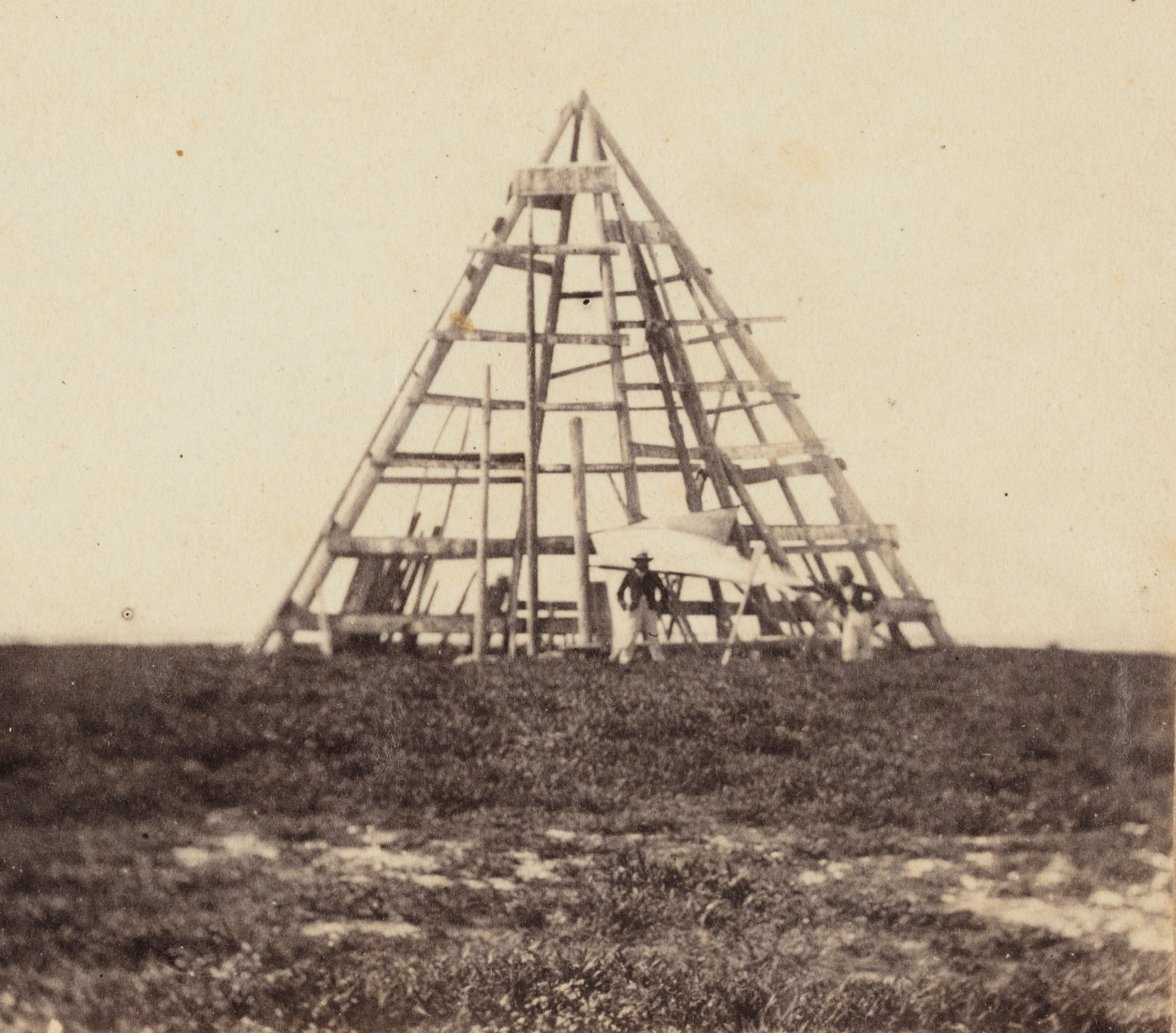
Beacon erected on Mellish Reef in the Coral Sea in 1859

On 5 April 1812, Captain Bristow discovered and named Mellish Reef and Cay. The French aviso Duroc wrecked on the reef on 16 August 1856. In 1859 HMS Herald erected the first beacon on the cay, using wreckage from Duroc.

In February 1813 she was well in the South Sea fishery, in this case Timor, as were Inspector, Albion, Baroness Longueville, Good Sachem, Ocean, Cumberland, and Venus.

Thames sailed from St Helena on 30 October as part of a convoy under escort by HMS Cormorant, a naval storeship coming from the Cape. The convoy included other whalers such as Cumberland, Warre, Admiral Berkeley, and Inspector, and some other vessels including Rambler. Cormorant parted from the convoy on 2 December about 280 miles west of Ushant, and arrived at Portsmouth on 18 December. Thames arrived back in England on 21 December 1813.

Year	Master	Owner	Trade	Source
1813	Bowerman; A.Bristow	W.Mellish	London–Southern Fishery	LR; lengthened 1811
1814	A.Bristow	W.Mellish	London–Southern Fishery	LR; lengthened 1811
1816	A.Bristow; Stavers	W.Mellish	London–Southern Fishery	LR; lengthened 1811

In 1813 the British East India Company (EIC) had lost its monopoly on the trade between India and Britain. British ships were then free to sail to India or the Indian Ocean under a licence from the EIC. Thames's owners applied for a licence on 9 August 1814 and were issued one on 15 August.

4th whaling voyage (1814–1816): Captain John Stavers sailed from England in 1814, bound for the waters off Peru. In May 1815 Thames was at the Galapagos Islands.

On 5 February 1816, Thames was off St Helena on her way back to London when HMS Leveret, one of the naval vessels patrolling the approaches, fired several shots before Thames hove to have her papers checked. When Leveret's captain asked Stavers why he hadn't stopped at the first shot, Stavers replied that he didn't know whether she was friend or foe. When Leveret's captain stated that it was a pity a shot hadn't struck him, Stavers replied that if it had, Thames would have returned fire. In all, Stavers was quite disrespectful towards the naval officer.

Thames returned to England on 16 April, with in excess of 1500 barrels of whale oil. On her return several crew members accused Stavers of having caused the death of an apprentice.

Although some sources report that Thames was sold to the government, or private owners, she appears to have remained under Mellish's ownership. LR also did not show any change of ownership.

Year	Master	Owner	Trade	Source
1818	E.Lawson	W.Mellish	London–Southern Fishery	LR; lengthened 1811

5th whaling voyage (1816–1818): Captain Edward Lawson sailed from England on 27 June 1816. Thames returned on 1 July 1818, with 760 casks of whale oil.

6th whaling voyage (1818–1820): Captain Lawson sailed from England on 21 September 1818. Thames returned on 22 September 1820.

7th whaling voyage (1821–1823): Captain Lawson sailed from England on 31 March 1821, bound for Peru. On 8 October 1822, Thames was at Honolulu, having taken some 1700 barrels of whale oil in the waters off Japan. She returned to England on 5 October 1823 with 650 casks. The voyage from Lima had taken 93 days. Thames had brought with her a Spanish colonel who was carrying dispatches for the British government. On 5 October, as Thames was returning from the South Seas, she ran afoul of Freundschaft, Johanson, in the Downs. Freundschaft had to put into Ramsgate, having sustained some damage.

Year	Master	Owner	Trade	Source
1824	E.Lawson; Meek	W.Mellish	London–Southern Fishery	Register of Shipping; lengthened 1811

8th whaling voyage (1824–1826): Captain John Meek sailed from England on 10 October 1824, bound for the Sandwich Islands. On 25 April and 29 October 1825 Thames was at Honolulu. She returned to England on 5 December 1826 with 500 casks of oil.

== Fate ==
LR continued to carry Thames with stale data for a number of years after 1826. However, William Mellish had purchased a new Thames, launched on the Thames, in 1827, that set out for the Southern Whale Fishery on 6 September 1827.
