= HMS Inspector (1782) =

British naval sloop (1782–1802) and UK whaler and merchant ship (1802–1821)

History

Great Britain
- Name: HMS Inspector
- Ordered: 17 April 1780
- Laid down: June 1780
- Launched: 29 April 1782
- Fate: Sold February 1802

United Kingdom
- Name: Inspector
- Builder: Moses Game, Wivenhoe (Note: Lloyd's List gave the launch place as nearby Harwich.)
- Acquired: February 1802 by purchase
- Fate: Condemned 1821

General characteristics
- Tons burthen: 30646/94, or 320, or 328 (bm)
- Length: Overall: 97 ft 2 in (29.6 m); Keel: 8 ft 0 1/4 in (2.4 m)
- Beam: 26 ft 10 in (8.2 m)
- Depth of hold: 13 ft 3 in (4.0 m)
- Complement: RN: 125 (121 after 1794); 1804: 30; 1806: 24
- Armament: RN: 16 × 6-pounder guns + 12 swivel guns; 1804: 10 × 6-pounder guns; 1806: 10 × 6-pounder guns

HMS Inspector was launched at Wivenhoe in 1782 as the only vessel built to her design. She participated in one campaign and also captured a handful of small merchant vessels before the Navy sold her in 1802. Most notably, her crew participated in the mutiny at the Nore. After her sale, she became the whaler Inspector. She made six complete voyages to the British southern whale fishery. A Chilean privateer captured her in May 1819. Eventually she was condemned as unseaworthy at Santander in 1821.

== Royal Navy ==
Commander William Heath commissioned Inspector in March 1783 for the Irish Sea. He recommissioned her in May. She was paid off in October 1787.

Commander Alexander Mackay recommissioned Inspector in January 1788 for Southwest Scotland. She was refitted for Channel service at Plymouth between June and September 1789.

Inspector came under Commander James Lecky in October 1790, still for Southwest Scotland. She underwent fitting at Deptford between March and June 1793.

Commander Wyndham Bryer recommissioned Inspector in May 1793. He sailed for the Leeward Islands on 26 December 1793.

In 1794 Inspector was part of the naval forces at Admiral Jervis's capture of the French colonies of Martinique, Guadeloupe and Saint Lucia (Note: Prize money was paid in late 1795. The amount for a captain present at the capture of all three islands was £203 11s 4 1/2d; the amount for a seaman was £1 10s. A second payment in 1800 amounted to £777 4s 6 1/4 for captains, and £3 13s 4 3/4 for seamen.)

Commander Bryer died on 23 October 1794. Commander John Cooke replaced him in command of Inspector.

On 7 April 1795 Inspector captured the sloop Harriet.

Then in June 1795 Commander Robert Otway replaced Cooke. He paid off Inspector in December 1795.

In September 1796 Commander Charles Lock commissioned Inspector for the North Sea.

In May–June 1797 Inspector was caught up in the Spithead and Nore mutinies, with her crew taking Lock hostage. She was at Yarmouth as part of Admiral Duncan's North Sea squadron when her crew mutinied on 30 May. They sailed her to the Nore to join the mutineers there. The mutiny aboard Inspector followed the foiling of an earlier plot on the Humber on 25 May with the mutineers intending to sail her to France. Lock had the four ringleaders confined aboard HMS Nonsuch. At the Nore Inspector's mutineers there stated that they were holding Lock hostage for the four arrested men. Between 3 and 11 June, Inspector was one of the four naval vessels that blockaded the Thames. Lock was escorted off Inspector on 13 June; the mutiny on Inspector ended the next day. Eventually, all the mutineers aboard Inspector were pardoned, but they and many others of the crew were transferred to other vessels.

In the summer of 1799 the Admiralty ordered Inspector to convoy the merchant ships assembled at the Nore bound for Archangel to the 54 deg. latitude. She was to call at the Humber and some similar ports to gather the vessels there too.

On 30 July, HMS Astraea, Inspector, and Apollo captured the Dutch Greenlandsmen (northern fisheries whalers) Frederick and Waachzamghheer. Then a week later they captured the Dutch Greenlandsman Liefde . Another prize money notice reported that Inspector shared with Astria, and Apollo in the prize money of the capture in August 1798 of the Dutch Greenlands ships Delfte, Groenlandia, and Waachzamghheer.

On 1 December 1799 Commander Lock and Inspector recaptured the ship Meanwell. The new French privateer lugger Fantasie, of 14 guns and 60 men had captured Meanwell, Manners, master, in late November, as well as some other merchant vessels. HMS Jalouse captured Fantasie and took her into Harwich. (Note: Meanwell, of 210 tons (bm), had been launched in 1799 by John Summers, at Gateshead.)

In August 1800 Inspector detained Indian Chief, Service, master, as she was sailing from Hamburg to Bengal. The government seized seven bales of linen. Inspector shared the prize money with the hired armed cutter Diligent. (Note: Prize money for some bales of linen on Indian Chief, net of costs for the detained neutral vessels, amounted to £4 11s 9d for a petty officer and £1 11s 6d for a seaman.)

Commander Lock died on 14 February 1800 at Bath. Commander George Sayer replaced Lock in command of Inspector.

On 5 May 1800 Inspector recaptured Johanna Eleanora. (Note: Johanna Eleanora, of 110 tons (bm), had been launched in Pomerania.)

On 15 December 1800, Admiral Archibald Dickson at Yarmouth Roads, sent Shannon, Bittern, the hired armed lugger Phoenix, and hired armed cutter Drake on a cruise to protect the homeward-bound Baltic fleet from French privateers, one having been reported off Scarborough. He stated in a letter that he intended to augment the patrol with Inspector and the cutters Hazardand Diligent when they arrived. (Note: Dickson's letter referred to Diligence, but there is no record of a hired cutter Diligence.)

In February 1801 Commander Robert Howe Bromley took command of Inspector on the Leith Roads station.

Disposal: "The Principal Offices and Commissioners of His Majesty's Navy" offered the "Inspector Sloop, 310 Tons, Copper-bottomed and Copper-fastened, lying at Sheerness" for sale on 24 February 1802. Inspector was sold at that time, at the commencement of the Peace of Amiens.

== Mercantile service ==
Daniel Bennett purchased Inspector.

1st whaling voyage (1802–1804): Captain Thomas Dennis sailed from England on 10 June 1802. On 1 March 1803 a whale strike caused Captain Dennis great injury and he died a few days later. Captain Harney took command. Inspector returned to England on 6 March 1804 with more than 700 barrels of whale oil.

2nd whaling voyage (1804–1805): Captain Simon Smith acquired a letter of marque on 28 April 1804. he sailed from England on 10 May 1804, bound for the Isle of Desolation. He returned on 11 July 1805.

3rd whaling voyage (1806–1808): Captain Robert Poole acquired a letter of marque on 24 April 1806. He sailed from England on 15 May 1806. She was reported to have been "all well" at Bay of Islands in March 1806 and again off New Zealand in September. In 1808 Inspector, Poole, master, Grand Sachem, Whippey, master, and Commerce, Ceroni, master, in Bay of Islands. Grand Sachem and Inspector were full of oil and preparing to return to England. Inspector arrived back in England on 23 August 1808.

4th whaling voyage (1808–1811): Captain John Walker sailed from England on 7 October 1808. On 10 July 1811, Inspector, Walker, master, left St Helena for London. Lloyd's List reported in October 1811 that she had grounded on Margate Sand, but had been gotten off and put into Margate with the loss of her anchors, cables, and bowsprit, and other damage. She arrived back at Gravesend, Kent on 9 October 1811.

Year	Master	Owner	Trade	Source & notes
1812	T.Dennis	D.Bennet	London–South Seas	LR; new wales and good repair 1802, and some repairs 1805; annotation "on shore"
1813	Stratton	D.Bennet	London–South Seas	LR; good repair 1811

5th whaling voyage (1812–1813): Captain Andrew Sturton (or Stirton) sailed from England in 1812. In February 1813 Inspector was well in the South Sea fishery, in this case at Timor, as were Albion, Baroness Longueville, Cumberland, Good Sachem, Ocean, Thames, and Venus. Inspector sailed from St Helena as part of a convoy under escort by HMS Cormorant, a naval storeship coming from the Cape. The convoy included other whalers such as Cumberland, Thames, Admiral Berkeley, and Warre, and some other vessels including Rambler. Cormorant parted from the convoy on 2 December about 280 miles west of Ushant, and arrived at Portsmouth on 18 December. On 6 December Thames and Cumberland spoke Inspector, Martin, master; she had lost her bowsprit, her fore and main masts, and her mizen topmast. Inspector arrived at Gravesend on 21 December.

In 1813 the British East India Company (EIC) had lost its monopoly on the trade between India and Britain. British ships were then free to sail to India or the Indian Ocean under a licence from the EIC. Inspector's owners applied for a licence on 25 July 1814 to engage in whaling in the East Indies and received it on 8 August. By then Inspector had already sailed.

6th whaling voyage (1814–1817): Captain Barnabas Gardner sailed from London on 10 May 1814. On 6 December 1816 Inspector was at Timor. She returned to England on 18 February 1817.

Year	Master	Owner	Trade	Source
1818	A.Dunkin	Bennet	London–South Seas	LR; good repair 1811

7th whaling voyage (1817–loss): Captain John Duncan sailed from England on 4 September 1817, bound for Peru.

The Chilean privateer Chileno captured Inspector in May 1818 and sent her into Valparaiso, where Inspector arrived on 26 June. Lloyd's List reported in November 1818 that Inspector, Dunkin, master, had been captured and taken into Valparaiso.

== Fate ==
Lloyd's List continued to carry Inspector with unchanged info until 1825.

However, on 19 December 1819 Inspector, Bruce, master, arrived at Valparaiso from Callao. Then on 1 March 1821 Inspector, Pashers, master, arrived at Rio de Janeiro from Guayaquil. Inspector, Brun, master, was also reported to have arrived on 24 March at Rio. Then in June Lloyd's List reported that Inspector, Parkers, master, had arrived at St Andero. Reportedly, Inspector was condemned at Santander as unseaworthy and broken up there.
