= Star (ship) =

At least three ships have been named Star:

- Star (1800 ship), was built in Calcutta in 1800. Between 1803 and 1811 she made three seal hunting voyages. (In 1805 she transferred her registry to Great Britain.) From 1812 she sailed as a merchantman until she was wrecked on 18 December 1829 on a voyage to Jamaica.
- Star (1812 ship), was launched in New York in 1812. She was captured in 1813. In 1815 she sailed to Batavia under a license from the British East India Company (EIC). On her way back a privateer from the United States captured her in a notable single-ship action and then sent her into New York.
- Star (1855 ship), sailing vessel launched in 1855 by Andrew Leslie & Co, Hebburn. Driven ashore in gale and wrecked in 1859.
- MS Star (1978), originally Merzario Hispania and later MS Nordic Ferry, a car ferry
- MS Star (2006), a fast ro-pax ferry launched in 2006 and operated by Tallink beginning in 2007. In 2023, the vessel was chartered by Irish Ferries and renamed Oscar Wilde and then in 2024, James Joyce. In 2025 the vessel returned to Tallink and regained her original name MS Star.

== See also ==
- HMS Star, for warships of the Royal Navy
- USS Star, for warships of the United States Navy
- HMCS Star, a Canadian naval establishment
