= Warre (1802 ship) =

UK merchant ship, naval transport, and whaler (1802–1823)

History

United Kingdom
- Name: Warre
- Launched: 1802, Hull
- Fate: Wrecked 1823

General characteristics
- Tons burthen: 327, or 330 (bm)
- Armament: 1806: 2 × 4-pounder guns; 1809: 8 × 18-pounder carronades; 1812: 2 × 9-pounder guns + 10 × 18-pounder carronades

Warre was launched in 1802, at Kingston upon Hull. She initially primarily traded with the Baltic. From late 1806 to 1811, she was under charter to the Transportation Board. During this period she participated in the British invasion of the River Plate. Between 1812 and 1813, she made a voyage as a whaler in the British southern whale fishery. When she returned to London, her master discovered that both sets of owners had gone bankrupt while she was at sea. This resulted in a court case to determine who now owned the cargo. Warre then returned to trading widely until she was wrecked in 1823, in ice in the Baltic. Her remains were discovered in 2020, photographed, and documented.

== Career ==
Warre first appeared in Lloyd's Register (LR) in 1802. She also entered the Register of Shipping (RS)

Year	Master	Owner	Trade	Source & notes
1802	John Bowser	Captain &Co.	Hull–Baltic	LR
1802	J.Bowser	Clarkson	Hull–Baltic	RS
1806	R.Easenwood	Clarkson	Liverpool–Russia	LR; damages repaired 1806
1809	Easonwood	Clarkson	London transport	RS; damages repaired 1806

At some point, probably in late 1806, given a mention in the ship arrival and departure (SAD) data in Lloyd's List, Robinson, Clarkson, and Parker, Warre's owners, chartered her to the Transportation Board. Her listing in Lloyd's Register did not reflect this, though it did appear in the Register of Shipping. Warre participated in the British invasion of the River Plate in 1807 as a victualer for the British Army. On 14 January 1808, she was among the transports that returned to Portsmouth from the River Plate.

On 30 January 1809, a gale sent Warre into Portsmouth harbour with the loss of her anchor and cables. She was one of several vessels equally or more afflicted. On 14 March 1809, Warre, Ealing, master, was one of a fleet of vessels that had come into Gibraltar. The transport Warre, Easingwood, arrived at Portsmouth on 10 September, from Gibraltar.

On 30 May 1811, Warre was one of 30 transports that had arrived at Portsmouth from Lisbon. On 27 June, a like number of transports joined Warre, Easingwood, master, in sailing from Portsmouth to Lisbon. On 27 September, the transports returned to Portsmouth from Lisbon.

At the end of 1811, the Transport Board discharged Warre.

On 10 March 1812, Warre, Kenney, master, was reported to have sailed from Portsmouth to St Vincent.

Year	Master	Owner	Trade	Source & notes
1813	Kenney	Clarkson	London–South Seas	RS; damages repaired 1806

Whaling voyage (1812–1813): Captain J. Kenney left the United Kingdom on 15 May 1812, bound for the South Seas. On 26 April 1813, Warre, Kenney, master, was at the Cape, having come from the Falkland Islands. On 1 June, she sailed for London from the Cape.

Warre sailed from St Helena on 30 October, as part of a convoy under escort by HMS Cormorant, a naval storeship coming from the Cape. The convoy included other whalers such as Cumberland, Thames, Admiral Berkeley, and Inspector, and some other vessels including Rambler. Cormorant parted from the convoy on 2 December, about 280 miles west of Ushant, and arrived at Portsmouth on 18 December. Warre arrived back at Deal on 21 December.

On Warre's return to London Kenny refused to hand over her cargo of 500 tons of whale oil as both sets of owners, Robinson, Clarkson, & Parker and Sharp & Sons, had become bankrupt in January 1813 and October 1812. The Court decided that the monies due to Kenny and his crew be placed with the Bank of England (i.e. preserved), and the rest disbursed. The initial court decision, in 1814, assigned the vessel to Robinson, Clarkson, and Parker, and the cargo to Sharp & Sons. The two sets of owners then sued each other over the ownership of the ship and cargo. The Court in 1823, found for Robinson, Clarkson & Parker, awarding them ship and cargo.

Year	Master	Owner	Trade	Source & notes
1814	Kenney; T.Trader	Clarkson; Mills	London–South Seas; London−Jamaica	RS; damages repaired 1806
1818	T.Trader	Tibbett	London−Memel	RS; damages repaired 1806

On 9 July 1817, Warre, [Charles] Trader, master, arrived at Quebec from Shields. On 6 September, Warre, Trader, master, arrived at Gravesend, Kent from Quebec.

On 3 November, Warre, Trader, master, arrived at Gravesend from Memel.

Year	Master	Owner	Trade	Source & notes
1819	T.Trader	Tibbett	London−Barbados	RS; damages repaired 1817
1821	T.Trader; Flint	Tibbett	London−Monserrat; London–Honduras	RS; damages repaired 1817
1822	T.Flint; J.Murray	Trader & Co.	London–Honduras; Illegible	LR; small repairs 1819 and large repairs 1822
1823	J.Murray	C.Thompson	Hull–Petersburg	LR; small repairs 1819 and new top sides and deck 1822

== Fate ==
On 11 April 1823, ice forced Warre, of Hull, Murray, master, on to South Point, at Memel. She was taking on a little water, but until the ice came down nothing could be done to assist her. However, if the weather stayed favourable, and if she hadn't sustained too much damage from the floating ice, it was expected that she might be gotten off without too much damage. Unfortunately for Warre, she was totally destroyed the next day.

== Post script ==
Between 21 and 24 June 2020, the diver Holger Buss found and identified Warre at 38 meters below the surface at Klaipéda. On 12 September 2022, he published a survey report. The report has undersea photos of the wreck and a detailed history of the vessel.
