= William Darby Brind =

William Darby Brind (1794–1850) was a master mariner and whaler who settled in New Zealand. He was baptised on 28 July 1794 at St Philip's parish, Birmingham. He died at the Bay of Islands in 1850.

== Voyages in the South Pacific ==
On 20 March 1820 Brind arrived in the Bay of Islands as the captain of the whaler Cumberland, which was owned by Samuel Enderby & Sons. The Cumberland visited Kororareka (nowadays Russell) a number of times, including in August 1821, before sailing for Sydney, Australia in November 1821 with a cargo of whale oil.

Brind returned to the Bay as captain of Asp in December 1822 and in 1823 Asp made four whaling voyages from Kororareka. In 1824 Captain Brind sailed Asp to the whaling grounds of Japan. On 17 December 1825 Brind returned to the Bay of Islands as captain of the Emily.

From about 1823 until 1826 Captain Brind lived with a daughter of Pōmare I, chief of the Ngāti Manu hapū (subtribe) of the Ngāpuhi. Brind became a friend of the Reverend Thomas Kendall and assisted the latter upon his expulsion from the Church Missionary Society.

Brind arrived at the Bay of Islands in September 1828 as captain of Toward Castle.

From 1828 Brind lived with Moewaka, the daughter of Rewa (Manu), a chief of Ngai Tawake hapū of the Ngāpuhi. Their daughter was baptised Eliza Isabella Brind, who was murdered in 1841 by Wiremu Kingi Maketu, who was later convicted of the murder of Eliza and 4 others.

== The Girls' War ==
He is famous for sparking the Girls' War in 1830. It is called the Girls' War because it began with insults and curses being exchanged between young, high-ranking Māori women, rivals for the affection of Captain Brind. However, Brind was not in the Bay of Islands at the time of the incident. Te Urumihia, the wife of Kiwikiwi of the Ngati Manu hapū and the chief of Kororāreka, whose daughter was involved in the incident, cursed Brind's women (Pehi the daughter of Hongi Hika and Moewaka, the daughter of Rewa, a chief of the Ngai Tawake hapū, of Kerikeri).

== Later life ==
On 19 December 1835 Brind married Eliza Anne Snoswell, at Gravesend, Kent. Eliza Brind came to New Zealand and they lived at Matauwhi Bay, near Russell. William and Eliza had three sons and two daughters who were baptised in New Zealand. Brind died at the Bay of Islands in 1850.
