= HMS Advice (1796) =

Cutter of the Royal Navy

History

Great Britain
- Name: Brilliant
- Builder: Itchen Ferry
- Acquired: October 1796 by purchase
- Renamed: HMS Advice
- Fate: Sold 1807

General characteristics
- Tons burthen: 47 (bm)
- Length: Overall: 45 ft 4 in (13.8 m); Keel: 34 ft 9 1/4 in (10.6 m)
- Beam: 15 ft 10 3/4 in (4.8 m)
- Depth of hold: 6 ft 9 1/2 in (2.1 m)
- Complement: 10
- Armament: 4 × 3–pounder guns

HMS Advice was the mercantile cutter Brilliant building at Itchen Ferry that the Royal Navy purchased in 1796 while she was building. The Navy wished to employ her as an armed advice schooner. Mr.S.Wilson commissioned her in November 1796 and she was based at Plymouth. She was converted to a cutter rig in 1797 and had defects repaired between June and August 1799 at Plymouth.

From about 1798 Advice was serving as a tender to Royal William, then anchored at Portsmouth and serving as the flagship to Admiral Sir Peter Parker and then Admiral Mark Milbanke, Commander-in-Chief, Portsmouth.

On 15 June 1798 the tender Advice captured Stadt Emden.

On 31 May 1799 the tenders Advice and Ann captured Rosalio and Betty.

On 30 April 1800 the tenders Advice and Ann captured Embden.

Advice's subsequent career and fate are uncertain. A key source reports that Lieutenant Joseph Nourse commanded her in 1802 and sailed her out to Trinidad to serve as a tender there. It goes on to report that Lieutenant John Salter commanded her in 1804, but that she was lost in the West Indies in 1804. However, this information is highly questionable. The same source elsewhere has Lieutenant Nourse taking command of Advice in 1802 and sailing her to Trinidad. Although the same source does not mention Lieutenant Salter, it is improbable that in either case a lieutenant would command so small a vessel with a crew of only ten men. Lastly, the premier source on British warship losses between 1650 and 1859 has no mention of an Advice being lost after 1793, in the West Indies or anywhere else. Another major source on the Royal Navy reports that the Advice of this article was last listed in August 1799.

It appears that the Navy laid up Advice at Portsmouth, freeing up the name for the newly-built Advice. (The new Advice was three times the size, in both length and burthen, of her predecessor.) Then, the "Principal Officers and Commissioners of His Majesty's Navy", offered "His Majesty's Cutter Advice, lying at Portsmouth" for sale on 1 April 1807.
