= Albion (1798 whaler) =

History

Great Britain
- Name: Albion
- Namesake: Albion— an archaic name for Great Britain
- Owner: Champion (1798-1805); Wilson & Co. (1806-1809); Wallace & Co and Hammond (1809-1814)
- Builder: Frances Barnard, Son & Roberts, Deptford
- Launched: 25 October 1798
- Fate: Last listed in Lloyd's Register in 1825

General characteristics
- Tons burthen: 362 (bm)
- Propulsion: Sail
- Complement: 26
- Armament: 1800: 8 × 6-pounder guns + 2 × 18-pounder carronades; 1815:10 × 6-pounder guns

Albion was a whaler built at Deptford, England. A full-rigged ship, it wasnlaunched in 1798. She made five whaling voyages to the seas around New South Wales and New Zealand. The government chartered her in 1803 to transport stores and cattle, to Risdon Cove on the River Derwent, Tasmania.

== Voyages ==
On her first voyage, Albion, Eber Bunker, master, left Britain on 20 February 1799, bound for New South Wales. There is some ambiguity about whether she was carrying convicts or not. (Note: Clayton and a database of whaling voyages state that she was carrying convicts, as does a list of arrivals and departures from Port Jackson. But Bateson, who produced the most complete compendium of convict voyages to Australia, shows no such convict voyage. A different Albion did carry convicts in 1823, 1826, and 1828.) Albion arrived in Port Jackson (Sydney), on 29 June 1799, with a cargo of salted pork after a voyage of 3 months and 15 days.

Albion left Port Jackson in September bound for the whale fisheries around New South Wales (NSW) and New Zealand (NZ). She then took 600 barrels of sperm oil off New South Wales and New Zealand between September 1799 and August 1800. At some point Albion sailed to Tahiti at the request of Governor Philip Gidley King. When she returned to Port Jackson she reported having seen "immense numbers of whales".

Albion returned to Britain on 26 March 1802 with a cargo of 155 barrels of whale oil. Shortly before she arrived she reportedly rescued a ship on 19 March at 42°N 30°W, i.e., north of the Azores.

In July 1802 Albion again sailed for Port Jackson. The next month the Honourable the Court of Directors of the East India Company announced that they had licensed 19 vessels, Albion, Charming Kitty, and Flirt among them, to sail east of the Cape of Good Hope to engage in whaling in the "Southern Whale Fishery". Albion was at Boa Vista, Cape Verde, on 5 October. In January 1803, she was "all well" at the Bay of Islands, New Zealand.

Returning to Port Jackson on 6 July 1803, Albion, Captain Eber Bunker, went on a second whaling expedition along the Australian coast. Bunker discovered the Bunker Islands off the Queensland coast.

Next, the colonial government chartered Albion to carry convicts, stores and cattle, and also the leader of the settlement party, 23-year-old Lieutenant John Bowen, as part of the establishment of the first European settlement at Risdon Cove, Tasmania. Albion arrived there on 12 September 1803. (The accompanying ship HMS Lady Nelson had arrived about three days earlier. Between them the two ships carried 49 passengers for the new settlement: 21 male convicts, three female convicts, members of the New South Wales Corps, and free settlers and their families.) Albion, although chartered, had been permitted to take whales along the way. In December 1803, she was at New Zealand. She captured three whales and returned 600 barrels of whale oil to Sydney.

Then Albion sailed to New Zealand, leaving Port Jackson on 24 August 1804. She was reported "all well" off the coast of New Zealand in May 1804. She returned to London with 1,400 barrels of whale oil and 13,000 seal skins, arriving in Britain on 3 March 1805.

On 30 March 1806, Albion left again for New Zealand. She arrived at Port Jackson on 19 August under the command of Captain Cuthbert Richardson after a voyage of 4 months and 17 days carrying a cargo of general merchandise for Robert Campbell (1769-1846). (Note: Passengers on this voyage were the said merchant Robert Campbell and his family, who were returning to Sydney, Robert Campbell's nephews – the single Robert Campbell Jnr. (1789-1851) and the married George Thomas Palmer (1784-1854), who was coming to New South Wales as a lieutenant in the 61st regiment but with permission to settle as a free immigrant with his new wife. He was also joining his parents, who were already in the Colony (his father John Palmer (1760-1833) was business partner to his uncle), James Milson (1783-1872) a single immigrant farmer from Lincolnshire, and Patrick Purcell (1754-1859) a single immigrant farmer from Kilkenny, Ireland.)

On or about 12 October 1806, Albion sailed for the whale "fishery". She was reported "all well" of New Zealand in March 1807. On 13 May, Albion is reported as having returned to Port Jackson from a "cruise" (whaling trip) with "75 tons of sperm oil" and then having sailed again for the whale "fishery" on 27 May "to touch at Part Dalrymple". In September, she was again "all well" off New Zealand.

Albion left for England on 12 November 1808 with a cargo of whale oil. She was at St Helena on 27 February 1809, and left for Rio de Janeiro on 10 March. She returned to England on 20 May.

Albion again left Britain on 9 August 1809, under the command of Captain Philip Skelton. She arrived at Hobart Town, then part of the Colony of New South Wales, with a cargo of general merchandise on 21 December 1809 after a voyage of 3 months and 22 days. (Note: The known passengers on this voyage were again George Thomas Palmer (1784-1854) and his wife, a Mr. Cox and a Mr. Shelly, and the merchant Francis Williams (1780-1831) and his Australian-born wife returning to Sydney via Hobart after his having received permission to settle in New South Wales. He had previously been deported in November 1807 by Governor William Bligh, and after sailing from Hobart aboard Union arrived back in Sydney in January 1810. Williams was later convicted of embezzlement from the Bank of New South Wales in 1822. He received a colonial sentence of 14 years transportation and was sent to Newcastle.)

Albion's destination after leaving Hobart Town was "the whale fishery", and she was reported as at the Bay of Islands, New Zealand, in February 1810.

Albion was next reported in the Straits of Timor in August 1811, sailing for England with a "full ship" (of whale oil). Other vessels there were Grand Sachem, William Fennings, Richardson, master, and Greenwich, Bristow, master. Albion arrived back in Britain on 17 November. This marked the completion of what was to be Albion's last voyage into Australasian waters.

In 1812 Albion, still under Skelton's command, left on a whaling voyage to Timor. In February 1813, Albion was well in the South Sea fishery, as were Inspector, Baroness Longueville, Cumberland, Good Sachem, Ocean, Thames, and Venus. In August Albion was at Boro (or Bouru), in the Moluccas, with 190 tons of sperm oil. She then returned to Britain, arriving on 12 August 1814.

Albion ceased whaling and instead started trading with the West Indies. Lloyd's Register for 1816 showed her master as P. Skelton, changing to C. Dodds, her owner as Wallace & Co., and her trade as London-Tobago. An item in Lloyd's List in May 1817 reported that Albion had put into New York in December 1816 while on her way from Tobago back to London, but was supposed to sail from New York in April. The same item referred to her master as "late Dodds".

By 1818, Albion was under the command of Brydon, with owner Somes, and trade London-Calcutta. Then in 1819 West replaced Brydon. He sailed her to Mauritius, before she returned to the London-Calcutta trade.

== Fate ==
Albion was last listed in Lloyd's Register in 1825, and the Register of Shipping in 1826 with master W.W.West, owner Somes, and trade London-Mauritius.

== See also ==
- Whaling in Australia
