= Cumberland (1800 ship) =

History

Great Britain
- Name: Cumberland
- Owner: 1800: Hodgson; 1807:Samuel Enderby & Sons; 1824:Cairns
- Builder: Randall & Brent, Rotherhithe
- Launched: 10 April 1800
- Fate: Captured by pirates in 1827; all aboard murdered and vessel abandoned

General characteristics
- Tons burthen: 268, or 269, or 27192/94, (bm)
- Length: 95 ft 10 in (29.2 m)
- Beam: 25 ft 4 in (7.7 m)
- Propulsion: Sail
- Armament: 1801:2 × 4-pounder guns + 6 × 12-pounder carronades; 1810:6 × 6-pounder guns
- Notes: Two decks

Cumberland was launched in 1800 and sailed as a West Indiaman until 1807 or 1808 when she was sold to Enderbys. She then made five voyages as a whaler in the British southern whale fishery. Enderbys sold Cumberland and she proceeded to sail between England and Australia. In 1827 she sailed from Hobart and was never seen again. It later transpired that pirates had captured her off the Falkland Islands and killed her crew and passengers.

== Career ==
Cumberland enters the Register of Shipping and Lloyd's Register in 1801.

Year	Master	Owner	Trade	Source
1801	B. Bell	Hodgson	London–Baltic	Register of Shipping
1801	Drummond	Hodgson	London–"De.na"	Lloyd's Register
1802	Drummond	Hodgson	London–Jamaica	Register of Shipping
1802	Drummond	Hodgson	London–Jamaica	Lloyd's Register

Cumberland then continued to sail between London and Jamaica. On 14 January 1806, Lloyd's List reported that Cumberland, Kent, master, had been damaged in a gale at Portsmouth as she was on her way from London to Jamaica. Several other merchantmen were damaged at the same time.

In 1807, or 1808 Hodgson sold Cumberland to Samuel Enderby & Sons, who would employ her between 1814 and 1825 on five voyages as a whaler in the Southern Whale Fishery. The Register of Shipping is not available for 1808, but in 1809 it had recorded the change. Lloyd's Register did not catch up until 1810.

Year	Master	Owner	Trade	Source
1809	S. Swain	Enderby	London–South Seas	Register of Shipping
1810	Swain	Enderby	South Seas	Register of Shipping
1802	Kent; W, Swain	Hodgson; Enderby	London–Jamaica; South Seas	Lloyd's Register

Cumberland sailed in 1808. On 26 June Captain W. Swain was at Port Jackson with a cargo of oil, having come from England. He left on 20 July for the whale fishery. He returned from the fishery on 22 July 1809 with oil, and then left in September for the fishery again. Cumberland returned to England on 3 July 1810. Although there are reports that Captain David or Daniel Kell was master in 1810, this cannot have been for long.

Captain William Swain sailed Cumberland for the South Seas again on 10 December 1810. There is a report that Cumberland was at Port Jackson in 1811, and an advertisement of 15 June 1811 in the Sydney Gazette noted that letters had arrived per the ship Cumberland from England and were at the Post office, which agrees with J.S. Cumpston's report that the whaler arrived in Port Jackson 5/6 June and departed by 10 July, in contrast with other published port records which do not indicate this.

In February 1813 she was well in the South Sea fishery, in this case Timor, as were Inspector, Albion, Baroness Longueville, Good Sachem, Ocean, Thames, and Venus.

Cumberland returned to England on 22 December 1813. HMS Cormorant returned to Portsmouth on 18 December. She had sailed from the Cape on 5 September, and from Saint Helena on 23 October. She had been in company with a number of whalers and other vessels. Two of the whalers were Cumberland and Warre, and one of the other vessels was Rambler.

Captain John Shuttleworth sailed Cumberland on her third whaling voyage, leaving in 1814. He returned on 21 July 1817.

In 1813 the British East India Company (EIC) lost its monopoly on the trade between India and Britain. British ships were then free to sail to India or the Indian Ocean under a licence from the EIC. While Cumberland was on her voyage, on 23 March 1815 her owners applied for and the same day received a licence for her to whale hunt in the East Indies.

Captain John Christopher Gooch sailed Cumberland from England on 9 January 1818, bound for the Isle of Desolation. He died on 14 August when he went overboard off the southern end of Madagascar. Captain Andrew Marshall replaced Gooch and returned on to England on 20 July 1819 with 150 casks of oil.

Captain William Darby Brind sailed Cumberland from England on 22 October 1819, bound for the New South Wales fisheries. She was on her way to Sydney from New Zealand in July 1820 when she encountered one of the two boats carrying the crew members of the whaler Echo, which had wrecked on Cato Reef on 21 April. (Getting the boats ready to sail had taken some time.) Cumberland brought the survivors into Sydney. Cumberland was off New Zealand on 13 November 1821. She returned to England on 21 May 1822 with 500 casks of oil.

In 1824 Enderby sold Cumberland to Cairnes (Cairns, or Carns) & Co. The Register of Shipping for 1824 has Cumberland with a new master, Cairnes, and a new trade, London—New South Wales. She was also almost rebuilt in 1824.

On 29 September 1824, off the Cape Verde Islands, Cumberland was on her way to Rio de Janeiro when she spoke with Barkworth, which was bound for Bombay. Cumberland arrived at Rio de Janeiro 20 October, but Barkworth was never heard from again.

Cumberland left England 28 August 1825 with valuable merchandise and 59 passengers. She stayed at Rio for three weeks and arrived in Hobart 22/24 January 1825.

== Fate ==
Cumberland sailed on 26 May 1827 from Hobart, Van Diemen's Land, for London. She was not seen again.

Lloyd's List reported on 29 July 1828 that Cumberland had been captured and her crew murdered. Another report identified the pirates as sailing under "Carthagena" colours. Tasmanian newspapers reported that the pirates had captured Cumberland off the Falkland Islands. A hull that had been seen dismasted but afloat off the River Plate was probably Cumberland. A pirate schooner with 70 men had been captured and taken into Cadiz. Several men on her had confessed to the murder of Cumberland's crew and eight passengers, including two children. Seven pirates were hanged at Cadiz, and one, an Englishman from Guernsey, had been handed over to British authorities at Gibraltar. By another report, Captain Duthie, of Bengal Merchant, brought to Tasmania from Rio de Janeiro a report from Captain Crew, of Clarinda. Pirates had captured Clarinda and plundered her, but then had released her. While on board the pirate vessel, Crew had seen a bucket with the name Cumberland on it. A storm had driven the pirates to Cadiz. There the authorities turned them over to a British man-of-war, which had carried the pirates to Cadiz. Some were condemned there, and others were condemned in England when they arrived there.
