= Liberty (1787 ship) =

18th century British whaling ship

History

Great Britain
- Name: Liberty
- Launched: 1775, Bristol
- Fate: Lost ca. late 1798

General characteristics
- Tons burthen: 276, or 300 (bm)

Liberty was of British origin, built in 1775, that first appeared as Liberty in 1787. She made six complete whale hunting voyages in the British Southern Whale Fishery before being lost in 1798 on her seventh voyage.

== Career ==
Liberty entered Lloyd's Register (LR) in 1787 with T.Clark, master, Lucas, owner, and trade London–Southern Fishery. LR for 1789 amended her burthen downward and showed that she had undergone small repairs in 1789.

=== 1st whaling voyage (1787–1789) ===
Captain Tristram Clark sailed in 1787. Liberty was reported to have been in the Brazils in late 1787 and the Falkland Islands in January 1788, together with a number of other whalers. She returned to London on 5 June 1789 with four tuns of sperm oil, 222 tuns of whale oil, 160 cwt of whale bone, and 4500 seal skins.

=== 2nd whaling voyage (1789–1790) ===
Captain Clark sailed for the South Seas on 27 August 1789. Liberty was reported west of Cape Horn in 1790.

=== 3rd whaling voyage (1790–1792) ===
Liberty, Clark, master, sailed from Dover on 28 September 1790, bound for the South Seas. Liberty, Clark, master, sailed from Rio de Janeiro on 25 March 1792, bound for London in company with Venus, Coffin, master. There was a report that Liberty, Clark, master, had been lost in the South Seas, and she subsequently disappeared from LR. However, John Lucas & Co. continued to sail a Liberty.

=== 4th whaling voyage (1792–1794 ===
Captain Benjamin Baxter sailed from London on 27 August 1792, bound for the South Seas. She was reported on the coast of Peru on 1793. On 24 March 1794 Liberty was at St Helena. She returned to Gravesend on 29 July 1794 with 200 tuns of sperm oil, 12 tuns of whale oil, 160 cwt of whale bone, and 4500 seal skins.

=== 5th whaling voyage (1794–1797) ===
Captain Baxter sailed from London in 1794. Liberty, Baxter, master, was reported to have been at Teneriffe in early 1795. In August and September 1796 Liberty was "all well" in the Pacific Ocean. She returned via St Helena, and arrived at Plymouth on 8 May 1797 and Gravesend on 30 May with 200 tuns of sperm oil, 12 tuns of whale oil, 10 cwt of whale bone, and 45 lbs of ambergris.

=== 6th whaling voyage (1797) ===
Captain Baxter was reported to have been at Rio in November 1797 to replenish her water and supplies.

== 7th whaling voyage and loss ==
Around 20 June 1798 Liberty, Smith, master, sailed for the South Seas. Liberty was reported to have been at the Galapagos Islands in August–September 1798. Liberty appears to have been lost around late 1798 off the west coast of Mexico.
