= Baroness Longueville (1804 ship) =

Ship built in New York in 1804

United Kingdom
- Name: Baroness Longueville
- Owner: Waltham & Co.; Samuel Enderby & Sons
- Port of registry: London
- Launched: 1804, New York
- Acquired: 1806 by purchase
- Fate: Last listed 1825

General characteristics
- Tons burthen: 243 (bm)
- Propulsion: Sails
- Armament: 4 × 6-pounder + 10 × 12-pounder (NC) cannons

Baroness Longueville was a ship built in New York in 1804. She may have been a prize (under another name), but from 1806 on she sailed first as a merchantman, and then as a whaler for Samuel Enderby & Sons. She made at least four whaling voyages. She is last listed in Lloyd's Register in 1825.

== Career ==
Baroness Longueville first appears in Lloyd's Register in 1806, in the supplemental pages. Her master is listed as J. Taylor, her owner as Waltham, and her trade as London-Buenos Aires. This entry is unchanged in 1807.

However, a database of whaling voyages shows her as already under the ownership of Enderby's in 1806, and at Montevideo on 9 February 1807, with master J. Taylor. While she was under Taylor's command, she was reported to have been upset on 29 June 1807, at Jamaica by a severe squall. Still, she was gotten off, not having suffered any material damage.

On 21 October 1808, William Pitts or Potts sailed from Britain, bound for Peru, or the Brazil Banks. (Note: The Brazil Banks are the edge of the continental shelf to the east and south of latitude 16°S of the coast of South America.) Baroness Longueville was reported to have been off the coast of Peru in December 1809, with 45 tons (500 barrels) of oil. She was at St Helena on 8 July 1810. On 25 September, she was caught in a violent gale, as were many other vessels, and put into Ramsgate having lost her anchor and cable. She completed her voyage on 3 October 1811.

Captain S. Chace (or Chase) and Baroness Longueville left Britain on 21 February 1812. In February 1813, she was well in the South Seas fishery, as were Inspector, Albion, Cumberland, Good Sachem, Ocean, Thames, and Venus. Baroness Longueville returned to Britain on 9 November 1813. In May 1813, while she was at Timor, her Third Mate, John Clunies-Ross, received the opportunity to become captain of the brig Olivia, which opportunity he took. He would go on to become the "King of the Cocos Islands".

Captain D. Kell left Britain on 10 May 1814, and returned on 14 May 1816.

Captain Coffin left Britain on 17 August 1816, and returned on 5 July 1819, with 600 casks.

The entries in Lloyd's Register from 1820 until 1825 still show Coffin, master, Enderby, owner, and trade, London-South Seas. There is no entry in 1826. The entries in the Register of Shipping are the same, but end in 1823.
