= HMS Advice Prize =

Two ships of the Royal Navy have borne the name HMS Advice Prize. The name indicates the ships were taken as prizes by ships named Advice, and subsequently commissioned into the navy:

- HMS Advice Prize (1693) was a sloop captured from the French in 1693 and sold in 1695.
- HMS Advice Prize (1704) was an 18-gun sixth rate captured from the French in 1704 and sold in 1712.

== See also ==
- HMS Advice
