= Venus (1788 ship) =

British whaler

History

Great Britain
- Name: Venus
- Namesake: Venus
- Builder: William Barnard, Deptford
- Launched: 21 July 1788
- Fate: Last listed 1823

General characteristics
- Tons burthen: 295, or 296 (bm)
- Length: 97 ft 6 in (29.7 m)
- Beam: 27 ft 9 in (8.5 m)
- Complement: 28 (1801)
- Armament: 10 × 6-pounder guns (1813)

Venus was launched at Deptford in 1788 and made 15 voyages as a whaler in the British southern whale fishery. Of 812 whalers in the British southern whale fishery database for which there was data, she had the fifth highest number of whaling voyages. She was last listed in 1823.

== Career ==
Venus first appeared in Lloyd's Register (LR) in the 1789 volume (published in 1788), with D.Coffin, master, A[lexander]&B[enjamin] Champion, owners, and trade London–South Seas. (Note: Daniel Coffin appeared in a list of whale captains from Nantucket. It showed him as captain of Venus, and sailing from English ports.)

1st whaling voyage (1788): Captain Daniel Coffin sailed Venus from London in 1788. (He had sailed on a whaling voyage for A&B Champion in Triumph in October 1787.)

2nd whaling voyage (1789–1790): Captain Coffin sailed from London on 30 March 1789, bound for the coast of Africa. Venus arrived at the Cape of Good Hope in just two months. She then was the first British ship to whale on Madagascar Grounds in the Mozambique Channel. Venus returned to England on 21 October 1790.

3rd whaling voyage (1790–1792): Captain Coffin sailed from London on 23 December 1790, bound for the Pacific. Venus returned to London on 20 May 1792 with 1500 barrels of whale oil from 27 "fishes". She had sailed from Rio de Janeiro on 25 March 1792 in company with Liberty, Clark, master. She was also reported to have been at the Falkland Islands on 17 April.

4th whaling voyage (1792–1794): Captain Coffin sailed from London on 10 July 1792, bound for the Pacific. By November Venus was "All Well" at the Juan Fernández Islands. In March 1794, she was at St Helena, awaiting a convoy for the return to England. Venus returned to London on 21 July 1794.

5th whaling voyage (1794–1797): Captain S. Squires (or Squire), sailed from London on 9 October 1794, bound for Peru. Venus returned to London on 18 April 1797.

6th whaling voyage (1797–1800): Captain John Allez (or Allen), sailed from England in 1797, bound for the Pacific. On 8 December 1797 Venus, Allen, master, was at 26°00′N 20°30′W on her way to the South Seas. She was in company with the East Indiaman Belvedere. Venus returned to England on 25 April 1800.

7th whaling voyage (1800–1801): Captain Owen Bunker sailed from England on 20 May 1800. Venus, Barnabas Gardner, master, returned on 9 February 1801.

8th whaling voyage (1801–1803): Captain Barnabas Gardner (or Gardiner) sailed from London for Port Jackson and the South Seas on 31 March 1801. Venus arrived at Port Jackson on 16 September with a cargo of general merchandise. While at Port Jackson Captain Gardiner was one of three South Sea whaling masters interviewed by Governor King about the best route to Australia and the relative merits of the whale fishery offshore compared with that off the west coast of South America. The vessel departed Sydney 13 October. She then fished off New Zealand. She last left Port Jackson on 18 May 1803, bound for England, and in company with Greenwich. The two parted company on 11 June in a gale at 50°30′N 140°30′W. Venus sailed via Cape Horn and arrived at London on 26 September 1803. (Note: Greenwich too arrived safely back in England.)

9th whaling voyage (1804–1806): Captain Gardner sailed from England on 19 January 1804, bound for Timor. Venus returned to London on 29 October 1806.

Between her 9th and 10th whaling voyages, Venus's ownership changed. LR for 1808 showed her master changing from B. Gardner to J. Dunn, her owner from Champion to Birnie, and her trade from London–South Seas to London–Botany Bay. She did not sail to New South Wales; Venus, Dunn, master, did not reappear on the list of vessels arriving at Port Jackson.

10th whaling voyage (1808–1810): Captain John Dunn sailed from London on 4 March 1808. She was reported to have been at 2°30′S 23°40′W on 12 April, bound from London to the South Seas in company with Scorpion. Venus was reported off the coast of Peru in 1809 and 1810.

11th whaling voyage (1811): Captain Dunn sailed from London on 1 February 1811, and returned seven months later on 2 September.

12th whaling voyage (1812–1814): Captain Mattinson (or Mathieson, or Matheson), sailed from London on 2 December 1812. In February 1813 she was well in the South Sea fishery, in this case Timor, as were Inspector, Albion, Baroness Longueville, Good Sachem, Ocean, Thames, and Cumberland. Venus arrived back in England on 24 May 1814.

13th whaling voyage (1814–1816): Captain Rattleston, or Mattinson, sailed from London on 30 August 1814, bound for Timor. Venus returned on 12 December 1816 with 500 casks of sperm oil and headmatter, and four casks of "train".

14th whaling voyage (1817–1819): Captain Mattinson sailed from London on 14 March 1817. Venus returned on 24 August 1819 with 400 casks of whale oil.

15th whaling voyage (1820–1823): Captain Gray sailed from London on 14 March 1820. Lloyd's List (LL) reported that Venus, Gray, master, had arrived at Falmouth on 7 March 1823 from the South Seas, having lost her anchor and cables, and short of provisions having been out three years. Venus returned to London on 19 March 1823.

== Fate ==
Venus was last listed in Lloyd's Register in 1823. She was last listed in the Register of Shipping in 1824 with A. Bray, master, but that did not represent a change of master. The Register of Shipping had been carrying Bray as her master for a number of year.
