= Greenwich (1800 ship) =

History

Great Britain
- Name: Greenwich
- Builder: Thames
- Launched: 1800
- Captured: 28 May 1813

United States
- Name: USS Greenwich
- Acquired: 28 May 1813 by capture
- Fate: Burnt May 1814

General characteristics
- Tons burthen: 326 or 329, or 338 (bm)
- Complement: 1803:30; 1806:30
- Armament: 1803:12 × 6&18-pounder cannons + 2 swivel guns; 1806:12 × 6&18-pounder cannons + 2 swivel guns

Greenwich was launched on the Thames in 1800. Between 1800 and 1813 Samuel Enderby & Sons employed her as a whaler in the British Southern Whale Fishery, and she made four whaling voyages for them. In 1813 the United States Navy captured her in the Pacific and for about a year she served there as USS Greenwich. Her captors scuttled her in 1814.

== Whaler ==
Greenwich entered Lloyd's Register (LR) in 1800 with A. Law, master, Enderby, owner, and trade London–Southern Fishery.

1st whaling voyage (1800–1803): Captain Alexander Law sailed from London on 26 December 1800, bound for New Zealand. She arrived at Port Jackson on 29 May 1801 with a cargo of merchandise. After whaling in New Zealand waters she left Port Jackson 18 May 1803 in company with Venus. The two parted company 11 June in a gale at 50°30′N 140°30′W. Greenwich arrived back in England on 27 September 1803. (Note: Venus too arrived safely back in England.)

2nd whaling voyage (1804–1806): Captain Alexander Law acquired a letter of marque on 19 December 1803. He sailed from England on 16 January 1804, bound for Timor. She was reported at various places in the region such as Ambon, Buru, and Ternate. In late 1805 or early 1806 Law died; his son was on board at the time as an apprentice. Greenwich returned to London on 28 October 1806.

3rd whaling voyage (1807–1809): Captain Charles Cresar Bristow acquired a letter of marque on 16 December 1806. He sailed on 15 January 1807. Greenwich returned to England on 6 September 1809.

4th whaling voyage (1810–1812): Captain Bristow sailed from London but on 19 December 1809 Greenwich lost anchors and cables in the Downs and was blown into Margate Roads. She finally left on 16 January 1810. Around early August 1811 she was reported at Timor with 1300 barrels. Other vessels there were Albion, Skelton, master, William Fennings, Richardson, master, and Grand Sachem. Greenwich returned to England on 18 February 1812.

5th whaling voyage (1812–Loss): Captain Shuttleworth sailed from London on 28 June 1812, bound for the Pacific Ocean.

== USS Greenwich ==
USS Essex, Captain David Porter, was cruising in the Pacific when on 28 May 1813 she captured Greenwich. In all, on his cruise Porter captured 13 British whalers.

Porter converted Greenwich to a storeship and placed her under the command of Lt. John M. Gamble, of the United States Marine Corps. Greenwich cruised with Essex off South America until 3 October 1813 when the ships departed for the Marquesas Islands for overhaul and provisioning.

Upon his arrival in the Marquesas, Porter erected a fort on what he called Madison Island, and before leaving for Chile 12 December placed prizes Greenwich, Seringapatam, and Sir Andrew Hammond under the protection of its guns. Soon after Porter's departure, Gamble, who was left in charge, was forced to land a detachment to quiet a threat from the local inhabitants.

Lieutenant Gamble, despairing of Porter's return, began to prepare for departure from the islands in April 1814 by rigging Seringapatam and Sir Andrew Hammond for sea. Evidence of an impending mutiny was discovered, and although Gamble transferred all ammunition to Greenwich as a precaution, the mutineers attacked and captured Seringapatam on 7 May 1814, wounding Gamble. Two days later Gamble attempted to get Sir Andrew Hammond to sea, but was attacked again, losing four of his men.

His entire party now reduced to eight men, only four of whom were fit for duty, Gamble finally put to sea in Sir Andrew Hammond. Before he left he set fire to Greenwich. Gamble made the 2,000-mile voyage to the Sandwich Islands without a chart, only to have the British capture Sir Andrew Hammond on 19 June 1814.

== Post script ==
The Register of Shipping (RS) for 1814 annotated the entry for Greenwich with the word "CAPTURED". However, LR for 1814 not only did not mark the capture, it gave her a new master, Pease, and showed her continuing to sail to the South Seas for Enderby. LR continued to carry this information unchanged through 1816.

This led one source to state that Pease sailed her home in 1814 and that she continued whale hunting. The ship arrival and departure data in Lloyd's List between 1814 and 1816 has no trace of Greenwich, with or without Pease, master, during this period.
