= Marian (1800 ship) =

Great Britain
- Owner: Lambert & Co. or Lambert, Ross & Co.
- Builder: Calcutta
- Launched: 1800
- Fate: Currently unknown

General characteristics
- Tons burthen: 336, or 348, or 350, or 350 8/94 or 400 (bm)

Marian (or Marianne, or possibly Mary Ann) was launched at Calcutta in 1800. She made one voyage from Calcutta to England for the British East India Company (EIC) in 1801.

EIC voyage (1801): Marian sailed from Calcutta on 21 February 1801. She was at Saugor on 18 March, reached Saint Helena on 2 August, and arrived at The Downs on 1 November.

She was then admitted to the Registry of Great Britain on 17 April 1802. She enters Lloyd's Register in 1802 with J(ames) Purrier, master, and Lambert & co., owner.

For the invasions of Île Bourbon and Île de France (Mauritius) in 1810-1811 the British government hired a number of transport vessels. Marian was among them.

== Conjectural later career ==
One source states that Mary Ann, of 348 tons (bm), was launched at Calcutta in 1801. (The source has no other vessel of a similar name in the 1800-1816 period.) It goes on to state that later she became Fyzaal Kareem (or Fazzel Kurrim), of Bombay.

Marian, of 350 tons (bm), was listed as belonging to the port of Calcutta in January 1811. Fazel Kurreem, of 348 tons (bm), was still listed in 1819 and 1829,

Year	Master	Owner
1819	Sheik Aboo Bucker	T. Kay
1829	Sheik Abdoo Bucke bin S. Abdulla	D. Kitchener
