= Express-class schooner =

Type of historical British naval vessel

Class overview
- Name: Express class
- Operators: Royal Navy
- In service: 1800-1812
- Planned: 2
- Completed: 2
- Lost: 0 or 1
- Retired: 1 or 2

General characteristics
- Class & type: Express class
- Type: Schooner
- Tons burthen: 17848/94 (bm)
- Length: 88 ft 0 in (26.8 m) (overall); 72 ft 7 1/2 in (22.1 m) (keel)
- Beam: 21 ft 6 in (6.6 m)
- Depth of hold: 13 ft 1 in (4.0 m)
- Propulsion: Sails
- Sail plan: Schooner
- Complement: 30
- Armament: 6 × 12-pounder carronades

The Express class was a class of two schooner-rigged advice-boats of the Royal Navy. John Henslow designed the schooners to carry dispatches. To achieve speed they were long and sharp-lined. However, the Navy did not like them and so the Navy Board ordered no more after the launch of the two in 1800.

Both were commissioned in January 1801 for Jersey, and both sailed in a year or so for Trinidad. Express served until she was sold in 1813; Advice was lost in 1804 in the West Indies, or sold there in 1805.

The Navy tried again to find a design for an advice-boat. In 1804 it ordered 18 Ballahoo-class schooners. Then a year later it ordered 12 Cuckoo-class schooners. Both classes were built in Bermuda.

== Ships ==
Name	Builder	Begun	Launched	Fate
Express	John Randall & Co., Rotherhithe	July 1800	December 1800	Sold 1813
Advice	John Randall & Co., Rotherhithe	July 1800	December 1800	Lost 1804 or sold c. 1805
