= Townshend Packet (1800 ship) =

History

Great Britain
- Name: Townshend Packet
- Builder: Falmouth
- Launched: 1800
- Captured: 18 February 1814

General characteristics
- Tons burthen: 189 (bm)
- Armament: 1812: 2 × 6-pounder guns + 8 × 12-pounder carronades

Townshend Packet (Townsend Packet) was launched at Falmouth in 1800 as a packet for the Post Office Packet Service. She made numerous voyages between Falmouth and Lisbon and also sailed to the West Indies, Brazil, and the Mediterranean. She had two engagements with American privateers. In the first the Americans captured her, but then released her. In the second she repelled her attacker. A French frigate captured her in 1814 and then sank her.

== Career ==
Lloyd's Register (LR) only started carrying Falmouth packets in 1813. She was listed as having been built at Falmouth in 1800.

Richard Dodd was appointed her master on 26 April 1800. In September 1806 it was reported that Townshend Packet, Dodd, master, had been captured by a French privateer off the Isle of Scilly. She sailed from Lisbon for Falmouth on 7 October and arrived on 16 October.

Roger P. Western was appointed master of Townshend Packet on 24 February 1809.

Townshend Packet was driven from her moorings and onto the ashore at Falmouth on 24 January 1809 but it was expected that she would be gotten off.

At some point between 1809 and 1811 Townshend Packet stopped at Cagliari, Sardinia. She had as passengers to Malta Lord Byron and his companion John Cam Hobhouse.

James Cock was appointed master of Townshend Packet on 30 July 1810.

On 4 May 1811, Townshend Packet was on her way to the Mediterranean when she captured a Batavian government brig, of six guns and 30 men. and sent her into Falmouth. The brig was a rich cargo of spices and dispatches; the Batavian captain sank the dispatches before his vessel was captured. Townshend Packet sent her prize to Falmouth but on the way at the Isle of Scilly HMS Orestes boarded her and then took her into Plymouth, arriving on 14 May.

On 22 November 1812 Townshend Packet, Cock, master, was a few miles short of arriving at Barbados when she encountered two American privateer schooners, Tom, Captain Tom Wilson, and Bona, Captain John Dameron. Though greatly outgunned, Cock resisted.

In the table below, "K" indicates data from Kert; N indicates data from Norway.

Vessel	Burthen	Armament	Crew
Tom	227	140 (K); 130 (N)	10 guns (K); 14 × 12&18-pounder carronades + 2 × 9-pounder guns
Bona	112	70 (K); 90 (N)	5 guns (K); 6 × 18-pounder carronades + 1 × 24-pounder gun on a traverse
Townshend Packet	189	24 men, 4 boys, and four passengers that assisted (N)	8 × 9-pounder carronades + 1 × 9-pounder gun (N)

The battle commended at 7:30am with the American fire destroying Townshend Paket's rigging and holing her so that water started to accumulate in her hold. She repelled several attempts by the Americans to board, despite their greatly superior numbers. Finally at about 10am, Cock struck. Her master had been killed and 10 men were wounded, some severely. The Americans took possession of her with Captain Wilson giving Captain Cock a note attesting to his fierce resistance and giving the number of men and armament reported in Norway. Townshend Packet was sinking and the Americans proposed to put Cock into her boats to send the ashore while the Americans set fire to the prize. Cock protested that the boats too were in damaged states and that with many of his men wounded, the boats might well not reach shore. The Americans accepted a bill of exchange for £1200, plundered Townshend Packet, and turned her over to Cock and his men. Cock and his unwounded men repaired her sufficiently to be able to sail her into Barbados at 7pm. (Note: The Royal Navy captured Bona on 12 March 13 and Tom on 27 April 1813.)

Townshend Packet underwent sufficient repairs to render her seaworthy. She sailed from Barbados early in January 1813. On 18 January she encountered another American privateer schooner. At 3pm the American fired on Townshend Packet and gave chase. Cock fired his 9-pounder stern chasers. At 3:30 he succeeded in bringing down his pursuer's foreyard. Seeing confusion on the pursuer's deck, Cock yawed and fired a broadside that did further damage to his pursuers rigging. Cock then set off again while firing his stern guns. At 4pm the American schooner fell behind and a squall at 4:15pm separated the vessels, enabling Townshend Packet to escape.

== Fate ==
Townshend Packet sailed from Rio de Janeiro on 19 December 1813, bound for Falmouth. On 18 February 1814 the French frigate Clorinde captured Townshend Packet, Captain James Cock, at 48°30′N 9°00′W. Although Captain Denis Lagarde flew Portuguese colours in an attempt to trick Cock, Cock surmised that the frigate was French, not Portuguese, and threw his mails overboard before the Frenchmen boarded Townshend Packet. While the French were plundering her, two sails appeared in the distance. The French cut their activities short and sank her.

Clorinde took Cock and his crew on board and they were present, below deck, during the battle on 25 February when HMS Eurotas captured Clorinde. Cock died a few months later. Shortly before Cock's death, the Prince Regent of Portugal presented Cock with a gold medal of honour and the Military Order of the Sword for Cock's services carrying mail between Lisbon and Falmouth.
