= Grand Sachem (1801 ship) =

U.S. and U.K. whaler (1801–1822)

History

United Kingdom
- Name: Grand Sachem
- Namesake: Grand Sachem
- Owner: 1801: Leonard Smyth and Farnum Howe, Newbury; 1802: Benjamin Rotch; 1814: William & Daniel Bennett, London
- Fate: Last listed 1822

General characteristics
- Tons burthen: 236, or 250 (bm)
- Length: 88 ft 10 in (27.1 m)
- Beam: 25 ft 5 in (7.7 m)
- Draught: –
- Depth: 12 ft 8 1/2 in (3.9 m)
- Notes: Two deck & thee masts

Grand Sachem was launched at Newburyport, Massachusetts in 1801. She was registered at Bideford in 1803, but until 1815 sailed from Milford Haven. Between approximately 1803 and 1822, she made eight voyages as a whaler in the British southern whale fishery. She was last listed in 1822 and was broken up in 1826.

== Career ==
Grand Sachem was first registered at Newburyport in December 1801 with Josiah Bartlett as master. She was registered again in November 1802 with Coffin Whippey as master.

After she sailed to England she was registered at Bideford in 1803. She did not appear in Lloyd's Register (LR) until 1810, suggesting that she remained owned in the United States.

1st whaling voyage (1803/1804–1805): At some point in 1803 or 1804 Grand Sachem sailed for the southern whale fishery.

On 3 August 1805, HMS Calcutta, Captain Woodriff, left St Helena as escort of a motley convoy to England. The convoy consisted of the East India company's "extra-ship" Indus, from Madras, the southern whaler African from Desolation Island, the whaler Fox from the Mozambique channel, the whaler Grand Sachem from the Peruvian coast and bound to Milford, the Prussian ship Wilhelmina, which Calcutta had detained on her way out to St Helena, and the large Swedish ship Carolina, which was sailing from China and asked to join.

On 25 September 1805, the convoy was in the Channel south of the Isles of Scilly when it encountered Allemand's squadron. Calcutta engaged the French squadron and was captured, sacrificing herself for the convoy, which escaped. Fox and Grand Sachem went into Kinsale.

2nd whaling voyage (1806–1808): Captain Coffin Whippey sailed from Milford Haven on 21 April 1806. In March–April 1807 Grand Sachem was off New Zealand. She arrived at Port Jackson from the fishery on 11 September 1807, with oil. She left for the fishery on 26 September, with oil. The record of her visit shows her as an American vessel. In June 1808 Grand Sacham, Whippey, master, was in Bay of Islands, together with Commerce, Ceroni, master, and Inspector, Poole, master. Grand Sachem and Inspector were full of oil and preparing to return to England. Grand Sachem arrived back in England on 11 August.

She first appeared in Lloyd's Register in the volume for 1810. (Note: The 1809 volume is missing the "G" supplemental pages.)

| Year | Master | Owner | Trade | Source |
|---|---|---|---|---|
| 1809 | Denman | B.Roche | Cork | LR |

3rd whaling voyage (1809–1811): Captain Dunnaman sailed from London on 30 May 1809. Grand Sachem was at Cork on 17 June, bound for the South Seas. Around early August 1811 she was reported at Timor with 1500 barrels. Other vessels there were Albion, Skelton, master, William Fennings, Richardson, master, and Greenwich, Bristow, master. Grand Sachem returned to Milford Haven on 11 November 1811.

| Year | Master | Owner | Trade | Source |
|---|---|---|---|---|
| 1812 | Denman; J.Coffin | B.Roche | Cork | LR |

4th whaling voyage (1812–1814): Captain Coffin sailed from Cork on 4 April 1812, in a convoy for the West Indies under escort of the Cruizer-class brig-sloop HMS Trinculo. Grand Sachem parted from the convoy on 18 April at 36°55′N 18°56′W. She had lost the gudgeons of her rudder and Commander Alexander Renny, of Trinculo, had ordered Coffin to make for the nearest port.

In February 1813 Good Sachem was well in the South Sea fishery, in this case Timor, as were Inspector, Albion, Baroness Longueville, Ocean, Thames, and Venus.

In 1813 the British East India Company (EIC) had lost its monopoly on the trade between India and Britain. British ships were then free to sail to India or the Indian Ocean under a licence from the EIC. Grand Sachem's owners applied for a licence to sail to certain ports in the East Indies under the provisions for whalers. They applied on 21 August and received the licence on 23 August.

On 31 July 1814 Grand Sachem was at St Helena, waiting for a convoy. She was at Falmuth on 29 October, described as a "full ship". She had left St Helena under convoy by HMS Barracouta. Grand Sachem returned to Milford Haven on 14 November 1814; she carried the product of the 96 whales her crew had killed.

Benjamin Rotch had suffered financial hardship and in 1814 he moved his family and several ships to London. (Note: Three of his ships had been lost. USS Essex had captured two: New Zealander, and Montezuma.) Grand Sachem was offered for sale at auction in late July 1815, lying in the Surrey Canal. In 1815 ownership transferred to William & Daniel Bennett, London.

5th whaling voyage (1815–1816): Captain James Downey sailed from London in 1815, bound for Desolation Island. He returned to London on 20 June 1816 with 360 casks of whale oil and 20 seal skins.

6th whaling voyage (1816–1818): Captain Joseph Darney sailed from London on 4 August 1816; on 4 September she was at Boa Vista, Cape Verde. She arrived at the Cape of Good Hope from Desolation Island on 15 February 1818, and sailed for London on 21 February. On 15 April, at 25°53′N 37°30′W, Grand Sachem, which was returning from whaling at Desolation Island, spoke Alexander, Surflen, master, which was returning to London. Grand Sachem arrived at London on 5 May 1818 with 400 casks and 1600 seal skins.

7th whaling voyage (1818–1819): On 22 June 1818, Grand Sachem, [David] Littlejohn, master, sailed from Gravesend, Kent for the South Seas. Two days later she was at Deal. On 3 February 1819 Grand Sachem, Littlejohn, master, was at South Georgia with 50 tuns of oil. Also there were Ann, Dowell, master, Indispensable, Brown, master, Arab, Barclay, master, and MaryAnn, Todrig, master. Grand Sachem returned to England on 28 May with 150 casks of oil and 180 seal skins. This cargo was worth perhaps £1,300.

8th whaling voyage (1819–1822): Captain Woodward sailed from London on 17 September 1819. On 23 August 1820, the schooner Magnet, Vine, master, spoke a boat from Grand Sachem off the island of Boure. Captain Vine learned that Captain White of Grand Sachem had died some time before, and that her first officer had deserted at Ambonya, following the levelling of some criminal accusations against him.

On 18 December 1821 Sisters, Earle, master, arrived at Milford Haven. She had left Grand Sachem "on the Coast" with 1200 barrels. (Note: "On the coast" is off the coast of Japan. In April 1820 Syren had voyaged to the east of Japan. She spoke Grand Sachem on 6 October 1820. When Syren returned to the Moluccas in late 1820, even more vessels found out about this. Hence their presence off Japan in 1821.) Syren, Coffin, master, Emma, Sir Charles Price, and Emerald were also there. On 16 November 1821 Grand Sachem, Wright, master, sailed for London from St Helena. On 15 January 1822. Grand Sachem, Woodward, master, was at Deal, having come from Timor. (Note: Home-based masters were quite common. The owners would often employ a master who would prepare the vessel or collect it on its return so that the voyage master could arrive from their home a little later or return to their home a little more quickly.) On 22 January she arrived at Gravesend.

== Fate ==
After her return to London Grand Sachem was laid up. She did not again appear in Lloyd's List's ship arrival and departure data. Also, the volumes for 1823 of Lloyd's Register and the Register of Shipping no longer listed her. She was broken up in 1826.
