= Swan (1800 ship) =

History

Great Britain
- Name: Swan
- Launched: 1800
- Fate: Wrecked 10 May 1806

General characteristics
- Tons burthen: 117, or 135 (bm)
- Armament: 1800:2 × 4-pounder guns; 1801:10 × 6-pounder + 2 × 4-pounder guns

Swan was launched at Greenock, Scotland, in 1800. She traded widely until in 1805 she became a slave ship in the triangular trade of enslaved people. She was lost in 1806 while delivering captives.

== Career ==
Swan appeared in Lloyd's Register (LR) in 1800 with Hattrick, master, Ritchie, owner, and trade Greenock–Jamaica, changing to Greenock–Newfoundland.

Swan's first owner was Walter Ritchie & Sons. At the beginning of the 19th century, Walter Ritchie & Sons was one of the best known Greenock firms of shipowners. In 1808 Walter Ritchie moved to London to manage his London business. His sons then took charge of eleven ships, "by far the finest mercantile fleet...in Great Britain belonging to one firm."

Year	Master	Owner	Trade	Source & notes
1802	J. Fraser	Hamilton & Co.	Greenock–Trinidad	Register of Shipping
1804	J. Fraser; J. Bryant	Hamilton & Co. McKenzie & Co.	Greenock–Grenada; London–Seville	LR
1805	J.Bryant; D.Smith	M'Kenzie	London–Seville; London–Africa	LR; damages repaired and good repair 1805
1806	D. Smith	A. Shaw	London–Africa	LR; almost rebuilt 1803; damages repaired and good repair 1805

Voyage transporting enslaved people: Captain D. Smith sailed from England on 1 November 1805. Swan acquired captives in the region and then on 3 March 1806, sailed for Charleston. South Carolina, in the United States. She was wrecked near Charleston on 10 May 1806 without loss of life. Reportedly, she landed 194 captives. The entry for her in the Register of Shipping for 1806 has the annotation "LOST" by her name.

In December 1803, the South Carolina General Assembly had voted to reopen the African slave trade. Concern with the spread of yellow fever had caused the Assembly to suspend the slave trade. The Medical Society of South Carolina relaxed quarantine measures, prioritizing reopening the slave trade over public health. The Medical Society argued that the fever was not imported (correct), and not contagious. Later it was discovered that the disease was not directly contagious, but was mosquito-borne, and so indirectly contagious, and that quarantine would help reduce the spread.

In 1806, 33 British ships were lost in the triangular trade. Eight were lost on the Middle Passage, sailing from Africa to the West Indies of the United States. Although Swan was lost to the perils of the sea, during the period 1793 to 1807, war, rather than maritime hazards or resistance by the captives, was the greatest cause of vessel losses among British slave vessels.
