= Barkworth (1811 ship) =

1811-1824 British ship

History

United Kingdom
- Name: Barkworth
- Owner: 1811:Barkworth; 1822:Pedler & Co.; 1823:Taylor & co.
- Builder: Barkworth & Hawkes, Hessle, Hull
- Launched: 16 November 1811
- Fate: Foundered without a trace in 1824

General characteristics
- Tons burthen: 505, or 50539/94, or 523, or 533, or 536 (bm)
- Length: 115 ft 9 in (35.3 m) (overall); 91 ft 10 in (28.0 m) (keel)
- Beam: 35 ft 2 in (10.7 m)
- Depth of hold: 14 ft 10 in (4.5 m)
- Propulsion: Sail
- Armament: 10 × 18 + 4 × 9-pounder carronades
- Notes: Two decks

Barkworth was launched in 1811 and began her career as a West Indiaman. She then made one voyage for the British East India Company (EIC). Thereafter she traded with India. She disappeared without a trace in 1824 on her way to Bombay.

== Career ==
Barkworth appears in Lloyd's Register for 1812 with T. Forest, master, and trade Hull—London. the Register of Shipping has her sailing to the West Indies.

Year	Master	Owner	Trade
1813	T. Forest; Smith	S. Barkworth	Hull—London; London transport
1814	Smith	S. Barkworth	London transport
1815	Smith	S. Barkworth	London transport
1816	Smith; T. Lynn	S. Barkworth	London transport

EIC voyage (1816–1817): Captain Thomas Lynn sailed from the Downs on 24 March 1816, bound for St Helena and China. Barkworth was at St Helena on 10 June, reached Batavia on 30 September, and arrived at Whampoa Anchorage on 7 January 1817. Homeward bound, she was off North Island (the northernmost of three islands in the bay that formed the principal anchorage of Enggano Island), on 23 March and reached St Helena on 7 June. Barkworth arrived at Northfleet on 11 August.

On 28 October 1818 Barkworth was in Madras Roads when a gale drove her and a number of other vessels out. She then stopped at Trincomalee to refit and was expected to sail to Bombay.

Lloyd's Register carries Barkworth as continuing to trade with India. Lloyd's Register for 1823 has Pedler as master and owner, and her trade as London—Bombay.

Lloyd's Register for 1824 has Barkworth's master as Green, her owner as Taylor and Co., and her trade as London-Bombay. The Register of Shipping still has Pedler as master and owner, but agrees with the trade London—Bombay. It also notes that Barkworth underwent a thorough repair in 1823.

== Fate ==
On 29 September 1824, off the Cape Verde Islands, Cumberland spoke with Barkworth, which was bound for Bombay. Cumberland arrived at Rio de Janeiro 20 October, but Barkworth was never heard from again. (Note: Hackman quotes a clearly incorrect report that has Barkworth spoken to "while outward bound from London to the West Indies by the Cumberland West Indiaman, Captain Cairns, then bound for Botany Bay with convicts." Bateson (1959), the definitive work on convict ships to Australia, has no record of any vessel named Cumberland delivering convicts to either New South Wales or Van Dieman's Land. Also, Lloyd's List for 1824 has no vessel named Cumberland sailing on a route that would take them to Rio or via Rio, nor are the two vessels with Cairns as master on such a route. However, the Register of Shipping has a Cumberland, that had been a whaler for Samuel Enderby & Sons, but that now had a new master, Cairnes, and a new trade, London—New South Wales.)
