= Paragon (1800 Liverpool ship) =

History

Great Britain
- Name: Paragon
- Owner: Earle & Co.
- Builder: Liverpool
- Launched: 1800
- Fate: Lost c.1803

General characteristics
- Tons burthen: 435 (bm)
- Complement: 20
- Armament: 10 × 9-pounder guns

Paragon was launched at Liverpool in 1800. Captain William Hewitt acquired a letter of marque on 3 January 1801. She then sailed on a voyage as a slave ship. She sailed from Liverpool on 27 February 1801 and gathered her slaves at Accra. She delivered them to Demerara in September. She had left Liverpool with 55 crew members and suffered nine crew deaths on her voyage. She was lost after having landed her slaves. The Register of Shipping for 1804 carried the notation "lost" by her name.
