= William (1800 ship) =

Ship of the British East India Company

History

Great Britain
- Name: William
- Builder: Bombay Dockyard
- Launched: 7 July 1800
- Fate: Last listed 1826

General characteristics
- Tons burthen: 391, or 393, or 394, or 42126/94 (bm)
- Length: 110 ft 3 in (34 m)
- Beam: 30 ft 0 in (9 m)
- Armament: 14 × 6-pounder guns or 12 × 6-pounder guns + 2 × 12-pounder guns
- Notes: Teak-built

William was launched at the Bombay Dockyard in 1800 as a country ship, i.e., a vessel trading east of the Cape of Good Hope (the Cape). In 1801 she served as a transport in a naval campaign. In 1809 she made a voyage to London for the British East India Company (EIC). She survived several maritime incidents while sailing as a West Indiaman. She was last listed in 1826.

== Career ==
In 1801 William served as a transport vessel supporting Major-General Sir David Baird's expedition to the Red Sea. Baird commanded Indian army troops going to Egypt to help General Ralph Abercromby expel the French there. Baird landed at Kosseir, on the Egyptian side of the Red Sea. He then led his troops army across the desert to Kena on the Nile, and then to Cairo. He arrived in time for the battle of Alexandria.

In 1802 William's master was J.A. Pope, and her owner Alexander Adamson.

EIC voyage (1809–1810): Captain Rodney Kempt sailed from Bengal on 23 May 1809 and arrived at Bombay on 4 August. Captain John H. Askwith sailed William from Bombay on 24 September. William reached the Cape on 14 November and St Helena on 1 December. She arrived at the Downs on 23 January 1810.

William first appeared in the Register of Shipping, and Lloyd's Register (LR) in 1810.

Year	Master	Owner	Trade	Source
1810	J.Gumm	J.Marryat	London–Guadaloupe	RS & LR

William became a West Indiaman, sailing to Trinidad, St Lucia, and Martinique.

On 12 July 1810 William, Gumm, master, capsized in a squall at Point-à-Pitre with the loss of five of her crew. It was expected that she would be raised. She had 70 hogsheads of sugar on board.

William took on British registry on 25 September 1811.

Year	Master	Owner	Trade	Source
1813	Gumm; Lowry	J.Marryat	London–Trinidad	LR
1814	Lourie; W.Gum	J.Marryatt	London–Trinidad; St Lucia	RS

On 21 December 1814 William, Gumm, master, put into Harwich. She had been on her way to St Lucia when she grounded on the Ship Wash and lost her rudder. She sailed from Harwich on 8 January 1815 to return to London.

On 17 December 1821 William, Gumm, master, was at Plymouth, on her way to Trinidad, when a gale caused Lavinia, Moore, master, from London to Madeira, to run into William. William sustained some damage and Lavinia more.

Year	Master	Owner	Trade	Source & notes
1823	J.Gumm	J.Marryat	London–Trinidad	LR; small repairs 1822
1826	Addington	J.Marryat	London–Dantzig	LR; small repairs 1822

== Fate ==
William was last listed in 1826.
