= Albion (1813 ship) =

1813 English ship

History

United Kingdom
- Name: Albion
- Namesake: Albion— an archaic name for Great Britain
- Owner: R Kidd (1813-1820); Samuel Grainger (1821-1823); Charles Weller (1824-1826); Brass & Co (1832-1840); John Lidgett & Co (1840-1854)
- Builder: George Hilhouse & Sons
- Launched: 14 April 1813, Bristol
- Fate: Last listed in Lloyd's Register in 1851

General characteristics
- Tons burthen: 425, 435, 479, or 480, or 48462/94, or 486, or 488, or 500 (sources differ) (bm)
- Length: 125 ft 6 in (38.3 m), or 123 ft 11 in (37.8 m)
- Beam: 29 ft 3 in (8.9 m)
- Propulsion: Sail
- Complement: 35 & 44

Albion was a sailing ship of two decks and three masts, built at Bristol, England, and launched in 1813. She made three voyages transporting convicts to Van Diemen's Land and New South Wales. She also traded with Jamaica, India, and Quebec. For two of the voyages to India she was an "extra" ship (i.e. under charter) to the British East India Company (EIC).

== Career ==
Initially, Albion traded with Jamaica under the command of Captain William Buckham.

In 1813 the British East India Company (EIC) had lost its monopoly on the trade between India and Britain. British ships were then free to sail to India or the Indian Ocean under a licence from the EIC. Her owners applied for a licence on 22 September 1815 and received it the next day.

Then on 3 November 1815, Albion, Fisher, master, sailed to India, or more precisely, Madras and Bengal, under a license from the EIC.

Between August 1817 and 20 October 1818 Albion, Buckham, master, sailed from Bristol to Calcutta and back. This the first voyage to Calcutta from Bristol by any vessel. Her return leg took 167 days, including six days at Cape Town.

In 1820 Samuel Grainger (or Granger) purchased Albion. On 16 February 1821 he chartered her to the EIC at a rate of £8 11s per ton for 479 tons for one voyage to Bengal and back. Under the command of Captain Charles Weller she left the City Canal on 17 April 1821. She spent 20 days in the Downs before sailing for Madras and Bengal. She reached Madras on 16 September and arrived at Calcutta on 11 November. Homeward-bound, she was at Kedgeree on 14 January 1822 and at Madras on 3 February. She reached St Helena on 1 July and arrived at Blackwall on 1 September.

On her first convict voyage, under the command of William Rayner Best, she departed Spithead, England on 20 May 1823 and arrived at Hobart Town on 21 October 1823. She transported 202 male convicts, but off-loaded two convicts at Cape of Good Hope; no convicts died on the voyage. One of her convicts was the serial killer, cannibal, and bushranger Thomas Jeffries. Albion left Hobart Town and arrived at Sydney in December 1823. Albion was blown ashore at Port Louis, Mauritius, on 23 February 1824 with the loss of her masts, but she was able to heave off.

At some point Charles Weller purchased Albion. Her third voyage to India, and second for the EIC, took place between 8 June 1825 and 23 June 1826. Charles Weller chartered her to the EIC on 30 March 1825 at a rate of £12 19s per ton for 479 tons for a voyage to Bengal and back. Captain Charles Weller sailed from West India Dock on 2 May 1825, bound for Bengal. She was at the Down on 8 June, and reached Calcutta on 21 October. Homeward-bound, she was at Kedgeree on 24 December and Madras on 11 January 1826. She reached St Helena on 8 April and arrived at East India Dock on 23 June.

Albion departed Plymouth, England on her second convict voyage, under the command of James Ralph on 4 October 1826, and arrived in Sydney on 14 February 1827. She carried 192 male convicts; no convicts died on the voyage. She left Sydney on 3 June 1826 for Batavia.

On her third convict voyage, Albion was again under the command of James Ralph. She departed Sheerness, England on 1 June 1828 and arrived in Sydney on 3 November 1828. She transported 192 male convicts to Sydney; four convicts died during the voyage. She left Sydney on 1 January 1829 for London via Madras.

In 1832 Brass & Co., London, purchased Albion and placed her on a regular run to Quebec and the United States.

Year	Master	Owner	Trade	Source and notes
1832	T.Brown; G.Thomas	Brass & Co.	Cork–Quebec	LR; some repairs1825, 1828, & 1831, and new wales and large repair 1831
1839	G.Thomas; Johnson	Brass & Co. Lidgett	Bristol–America; London–Quebec	LR; damages repaired 1836

Albion ran ashore at Great Yarmouth on 24 January 1840 while on a voyage from Quebec City to Great Yarmouth. She was gotten off on the next day and brought into the roads.

In 1840 John Lidgett & Co., London, purchased Albion for general trade.

Year	Master	Owner	Trade	Source and notes
1840	Smith	Lidgett & co	London–Quebec; London	LR; damages repaired 1836 & 1840, & some repairs 1841
1845	Murwick	Lidgett & co.	London–Cape of Good Hope; London–Quebec	LR; damages repaired 1840 & small repairs 1841
1850		Lidgett & Co.	London	Lloyd's Register; small repairs in 1841 & 1849
1851		Lidgett & Co.		Lloyd's Register

== Fate ==
Albion was last listed in Lloyd's Register in 1851.
