= Star (1800 ship) =

History

Great Britain
- Name: Star
- Builder: John Bannister Hudson, Calcutta
- Launched: 17 December 1800
- Fate: Wrecked 18 December 1829

General characteristics
- Tons burthen: 119, or 11968/94, or 126 (bm)
- Armament: 2 × 6-pounder guns + 4 × 12-pounder carronades
- Notes: Teak-built

Star was built in Calcutta in 1800. Between 1803 and 1811 she made three seal hunting voyages. (In 1805 she transferred her registry to Great Britain.) From 1812 she sailed as a merchantman until she was wrecked on 18 December 1829 on a voyage to Jamaica.

== Origins ==
There is some ambiguity about Star's origins and launch year. Hackman states that Star was launched at Calcutta. Lloyd's Register (LR), and the Register of Shipping (RS) agree. However, the most complete listing of vessels built and registered at Calcutta makes no mention of Star. Furthermore, there is no earlier vessel of the same size but with a different name.

Hackman gives a precise date of launch of 17 December 1800. However, both LR and RS noted that she had undergone coppering and a rebuild in 1799. In later issues they no longer mentioned any rebuilding and gave her launch year as 1800.

== Career ==
The first mention in readily accessible online records of what is probably Star occurred in 1801 when Lloyd's List (LL) mentioned on 3 November 1801 that the recently arrived Star had brought news of vessels at St Helena.

Star first appeared in LR in 1803 with J.Birnie, master and owner, and trade London–South Seas.

1st sealing voyage (1803–1805): Captain James Birnie sailed from London on 8 August 1803, bound for Isle of Desolation. She sailed in company with Thames, Charles Gardner, master, and William and Elizabeth, J.Coffin, master. They were given permission on 14 October to leave their convoy, and separated from each other a little later. Star returned on 18 June 1805.

Star was admitted to registry in Great Britain on 11 Sept 1805.

2nd sealing voyage (1805-1808): Captain Birnie sailed from London on 10 August 1805, bound for the waters off New South Wales and New Zealand. Star first arrived at Sydney Cove on 22 February 1806. On 30 March 1807 Star left Port Jackson, bound for England. She sailed via New Zealand, which she visited in April, and she arrived in England on 3 February 1808 with 14,000 fur seal pelts.

Birnie sold Star to J. W. & T. Plummer. She was re-rigged as a snow.

3rd sealing voyage (1808–1811): Captain James Wilkinson sailed from London on 11 February 1808, bound for the fisheries off New South Wales. The snow Star, Wilkinson, master, arrived at Port Jackson on 10 October. She sailed from Port Jackson for the last time on 6 October 1810, bound for the fisheries. She arrived back at Gravesend on 12 August 1811.

Then on 21 March 1813 Star, Wardell, master, sailed to Newfoundland.

Year	Master	Owner	Trade	Source & notes
1813	Wilkinson; W.Wardell	Plummer & Co.	London–Botany Bay; London–Newfoundland	LR
1816	Wardell; J.Berry	Stephenson	London–Newfoundland; London–Saint Lucia	LR; repairs 1814
1823	J.Berry; J.Lister	Stephenson; P.Hays	London–Saint Lucia; Dublin–Gibraltar	LR; repairs 1814

Between 28 February 1823 and 2 March a gale hit Gibraltar, damaging many vessels. Star, of Dublin, Lister, master, lost her bowsprit and foremast.

On 18 January 1825, Star, of Dublin, had to put back to Cork as she was leaky.

Year	Master	Owner	Trade	Source & notes
1825	Blackmore	P.Hayes	Cork–Jamaica	LR; repairs 1814
1826	J.Lister	P.Hayes	Cork	LR; small repairs 1825
1830	Broderick	P.Hayes	Cork–Jamaica	LR; small repairs 1825

== Fate ==
Star, Broderick, master, was wrecked on 18 December 1829 on West Caicos. Her crew and part of the cargo were saved. She was on a voyage from Jamaica to Dublin.
