= Albion (1800 ship) =

British merchant ship 1800–1816

History

Great Britain
- Name: Albion
- Namesake: Albion
- Owner: 1800:J. Hayman; 1810:Higgins
- Builder: Obadiah Ayles, Topsham, Devon
- Launched: 18 January 1800
- Fate: Condemned 1816

General characteristics
- Tons burthen: 367, or 36762/94, or 369 (bm)
- Propulsion: Sail
- Armament: 1801:6 × 12-pounder guns ("of the New Construction"; NC); 1810:8 × 6-pounder guns + 2 × 12-pounder guns (NC) + 8 × 6-pounder guns; 1814:12 × 9-pounder guns + 2 × 12-pounder carronades

Albion was launched at Topsham, Devon, in 1800. She spent most of her career sailing between London and Jamaica. After 1814 she held a license from the British East India Company to trade with India, but she does not appear to have availed herself of the option. In 1814 the American privateer Brutus captured Albion, but the British recaptured her within a few days. She was condemned at Charleston, South Carolina, and broken up in 1816.

== Career ==
Albion first appears in Lloyd's Register in 1800.

Year	Master	Owner	Trade
1800	G.Potbury	J. Hayman	Exeter—London
1801	Postbury; J. Hayman	Hayman	London transport London—Jamaica
1802	J.Hayman; C. Warden	Hayman	London—Cape of Good Hope
1803	J.Hayman; C. Warden	Hayman	London—Cape of Good Hope; London—Jamaica
1804	C. Warden; J. Antrobus	Haman	Cork—Jamaica; London—Jamaica
1805	J.Antrobus; Butler	Hayman	London—Jamaica
1806	J.Antrbus; Butler	Hayman	London—Jamaica
1807	Butler	Hayman	London—Jamaica
1808	Butler	Hayman	London—Jamaica
1809	Butler	Hayman	London—Jamaica
1810	Butler; Deanham	Hayman; Higgins	London—Jamaica
1811	Denham; A. Smith	Higgins	London—Jamaica
1812	A. Smith; A. M'Neil	Higgins	London—Jamaica
1813	A. M'Neil; L. Hall	Higgins	London—Jamaica
1814	L.Hall; Skolding	Higgins	London—Jamaica

== Capture and recapture ==
On 25 December 1814, towards the end of the War of 1812, the American privateer schooner Brutus captured Albion, "Skoulding", master, off the coast of Ireland as Albion was sailing to Bermuda from England. Brutus was armed with 12 guns and had a crew of 120 men. Even so, Albion resisted for some two hours.

Brutus, of Boston, was under the command of Captain William Austin. American records indicate that at the time of capture Albion, of 350 tons, was armed with eight guns and had a crew of 15 men. Her captors estimated the value of Albion's cargo at $200,000. Austin put a prize crew on board her and sent her to America.

However, on 7 January 1815 Harlequin, Allen, master, recaptured Albion, "Scolding", master, at 50°20′N 14°50′W and sent her into Liverpool.

Year	Master	Owner	Trade	Source
1815	J.Skelding	Higgins	London—Jamaica	
1816	J.Skelding; W.Curry	Higgins	London—Jamaica	

== Fate ==
As Albion was sailing from Jamaica to London, Curry had to put into Havana on 18 October, having sprung a leak. She landed and sold 70 hogsheads of sugar. She was expected to sail again on 18 November.

Curry did not get far. Albion put into Charleston in some distress. At Charleston the surveyors condemned her as unseaworthy. She was sold on 11 January 1816 for breaking up. Her cargo was put on Commerce, Wilson, master.
