= Albion Packet (1800 ship) =

British schooner

History

Great Britain
- Owner: Old Ship Company (Note: The London and Leith Old Ship Company had been founded in Berwick but transferred to Leith early in the 19th century.)
- Builder: Gowan, Berwick
- Launched: 1800
- Fate: Wrecked 11 November 1832

General characteristics
- Tons burthen: 127 (bm)
- Sail plan: Schooner
- Armament: 6 × 18-pounder carronades

Albion Packet was a schooner launched at Berwick by Gowan. She sailed primarily along Britain's coasts, and later to the Baltic. She disappeared from the registers between 1816 and 1822, when she reappeared as Albion. Circa 1827 she became Albion Packet again. She underwent two maritime mishaps, one in August 1802 and one circa December 1827, before being wrecked on 17 November 1832 near Orford High Light.

== Career ==
Albion Packet first appeared in Lloyd's Register (LR) in 1800.

| Year | Master | Owner | Trade | Source & notes |
|---|---|---|---|---|
| 1800 | J.Ramsay | Old Shipping Co. | Leith–London | LR |

On 31 August 1802, Lloyd's List reported that Albion Packet struck on a rock at the entrance of the Tweed as she was sailing from London to Leith. Albion Packet put into Berwick with five feet of water in her hold and would be obliged to unload her cargo to repair.

| Year | Master | Owner | Trade | Source & notes |
|---|---|---|---|---|
| 1803 | J[ohn] Ramsay; W. Cooper | Old Shipping Company | Leith–London | LR |
| 1806 | W[illiam] Cooper [William] Halliburton | Old Shipping Company | Leith–London | LR |

In August 1809 Albion Packet sailed from London to Leith in 37 hours, the quickest such voyage known.

| Year | Master | Owner | Trade | Source & notes |
|---|---|---|---|---|
| 1810 | Halliburton; Creighton | Old Shipping Company | Leith–London | LR |

In February 1814 Albion Packet, May, master, returned leaky to Leith from Gothenburg. She had been delivering mail but was unable to get into the port because of the ice. She transferred her mails to another packet.

| Year | Master | Owner | Trade | Source & notes |
|---|---|---|---|---|
| 1815 | Creighton | Old Shipping Company | Leith–London | LR |
| 1816 | Creighton | Old Shipping Company | Leith–London | LR |

Neither LR nor RS published in 1817. Albion Packet was no longer listed in 1818. There was a report in 1819 that Albion Packet, of Leith, had been lost on the coast of Holland. On 16 or 17 October, Albion, Parker, master, was on her way from Leith to Hambro when she was driven ashore at Ameland. Most of her cargo was saved, but 43 casks of sugar were lost. It is not possible from the LR or SR volumes for 1819 to determine which vessel this was.

In 1822 Albion, of 125 tons (bm) launched at Berwick in 1800, reappeared in LR. The Berwick shipping Company had been established in 1820. (Note: The Berwick Shipping Company had been formed in 1820. It replaced earlier and smaller companies in the ice trade.)

| Year | Master | Owner | Trade | Source & notes |
|---|---|---|---|---|
| 1822 | Wm. Ord | Berwick Shipping Company | Leith coaster | LR |
| 1824 | W. Ord; M.Brown | Berwick Shipping Company | Leith coaster | LR; large repair 1815, & repairs 1824 |
| 1826 | M.Brown | Berwick Shipping Company | Hull coaster | LR; thorough repair 1815 |

Then in 1827, LR listed two vessels: Albion, with the same information as in 1826, and Albion Packet, of 126 tons (bm), built in Berwick, and launched in 1806. This was the first listing of an Albion Packet since 1816. She had a new owner, master, and homeport, suggesting that some confusion may have developed as a consequence of the change.

| Year | Master | Owner | Trade | Source & notes |
|---|---|---|---|---|
| 1827 | J.Hunter | C.Jackson | Hull-Shields | LR |

In 1827, Albion Packet, Hunter, master, was sailing from Hambro to Newcastle upon Tyne when she went shore near Cuxhaven. She was gotten off the sand and went into port in a leaky state to discharge her cargo and effect repairs. She came into port on 4 December. She arrived at Newcastle from Hamburg in January 1828 with a cargo of hides.

In 1828 LR no longer listed a Berwick-built Albion, only Albion Packet.

| Year | Master | Owner | Trade | Source & notes |
|---|---|---|---|---|
| 1828 | J.Hunter; W.Harrison | C.Jackson | Hull-Shields | LR |

From 1828 on, all the advertisements for Albion Packet's sailings gave her master's name as William Morrison, and her destinations as ports in Northern Germany or the Baltic.

| Year | Master | Owner | Trade | Source & notes |
|---|---|---|---|---|
| 1830 | W.Harrison; W.Morrison | C.Jackson | Cork–Havre | LR |
| 1831 | W.Morrison | C.Jackson | Hull–Newcastle | LR |
| 1831 | W.Morrison s.Forster | C.Jackson; Marwood | Newcastle–Humber | Register of Shipping; repairs 1824 & good repairs 1828 |

== Fate ==
Albion Packet, Marwood, master was driven ashore near Orford Haven on 11 November 1832. Her crew were rescued. She was on a voyage from Maldon, Essex to Sunderland, County Durham. The entry for Albion Packet in the Register of Shipping (RS) for 1832 carried the annotation "LOST".
