= HMS Cormorant (1804) =

Sloop of the Royal Navy

United Kingdom
- Name: Blenheim
- Launched: 1804, Howden
- Fate: Sold June 1804

United Kingdom
- Name: HMS Cormorant
- Namesake: Cormorant
- Fate: Sold December 1817

United Kingdom
- Name: Blenheim
- Acquired: 1817 by purchase
- Fate: Foundered late 1821

General characteristics
- Tons burthen: 327, or 327 76/94, or 328 bm
- Length: 100 ft 9 in (30.7 m) (overall); 81 ft 0 in (24.7 m) (keel)
- Beam: 27 ft 7 in (8.4 m)
- Depth of hold: 12 ft 0 in (3.7 m)
- Propulsion: Sails
- Complement: Sloop:70; Storeship:50
- Armament: Blenheim:4 × 6-pounder guns; Cormorant:14 × 18-pounder carronades + 2 × 9-pounder guns

HMS Cormorant was probably launched in 1803 at Howden Pans as the merchant ship Blenheim. The Admiralty purchased her in June and the Royal Navy took her into service to use her as a convoy escort. Then in 1809 it converted her into a storeship. After the Admiralty sold her in 1817, she resumed the Blenheim name and returned to mercantile service as a West Indiaman. She disappeared after 10 November 1821 and was presumed to have foundered.

== Blenheim ==
Blenehim, of 327 tons (bm), only enters the Register of Shipping in 1806. It gives her master as Lamb, her owner as Hurry & Co., and her trade as Shields–London. She does not appear in Lloyd's Register.

== HMS Cormorant ==
The Admiralty purchased Blenheim in June 1804. Blenheim underwent surveying by Perry & Co., Blackwall, between 26 May and 8 June 1804. The Admiralty purchased her in June, and she then underwent fitting at Woolwich between 8 June and 30 July.

In June Commander James Stewart commissioned Cormorant for the North Sea. On 20 August 1805 Cormorant captured Liefde. Cormorant sent Liefde, Geret, master, into Yarmouth. Liefde had been sailing from Husum to Amsterdam. (Note: When the prize money was finally paid in 1820, a first-class share, i.e., Stewart's share, was worth £441 18s 6d; a fifth-class share, that of a seaman or marine, was worth £8 9s 11½d.)

Lloyd's List reported on 23 August that Cormorant had sent into Yarmouth Vrow Jan___. She had been carrying a cargo of indigo to Emden.

In October 1805 Commander John Phillimore replaced Stewart.

On 11 March 1806 Cormorant and Romulus were in company at the capture of Minerva. Phillimore left Cormorant in October, and Commander William Hughes replaced him.

On 13 February 1807 Cormorant recaptured the brig Hope. The French privateer lugger Revanche, of Cherbourg, had captured Hope, Blake, master, off Dunnose, Isle of Wight, that day as Hope was returning to London from Madeira. Hope arrived at Portsmouth within the day.

Hughes sailed Cormorant in March 1807 to the Cape of Good Hope. On 26 January 1808 she captured the Dutch East Indiaman Marianne. Cormorant sent Marian, Kofoed, master, into the Cape on 8 February. She had been sailing from Batavia to Copenhagen. The Vice admiralty court at the Cape condemned Marianne and remitted £40,000 to the Registry of the High Court of Admiralty in London. (Note: Commander Hughes's share of the proceeds would have been at least £10,000, an amount in excess of 40 years salary. The fewer than 50 able and ordinary seamen, landsmen, and marines would have shared £5,000 equally, which compares with the annual wage for an ordinary seaman of about £22. This was only a partial payment. A second, more minor, disbursement, occurred later.)

Cormorant also detained and sent into the Cape three American vessels:

- Bellisarius, Wilde, master, from Batavia
- Telemachus, Gallop, master, from Manila
- Resolution, Cracraft, master, from Île de France

Between October 1808 and July 1809 Cormorant underwent fitting as a storeship. She was recommissioned in April.

However, Lloyd's List reported on 24 March 1809 that the sloop-of-war Cormorant had detained Batavia, sailing from Rochelle to New York. Batavia's crew regained possession of her, but then the letter of marque Irlam detained Batavia again. Irlam came into Liverpool, from where she went on to Barbados. A later report credited HMS Comet with the first capture, not Cormorant, and reported that Batavia's master, cook, and steward had recaptured Batavia, this time from Irlam's prize crew, and had taken Batavia into New York, her original destination.

In 1813 Mr. W. Kirby was Cormorant's master. He sailed her to the Cape in company with HMS Stirling Castle, which was sailing to the East Indies. On the way, on 11 June, they boarded Ainsley, Brown, master, which was returning to Liverpool from Africa.

Cormorant returned to Portsmouth on 18 December. She had sailed from the Cape on 5 September, and from Saint Helena on 30 October. She had been in company with a number of whalers such as Inspector and Warre other vessels, including Rambler.

In 1814 Cormorant sailed to Newfoundland. In 1815 Mr. T. Hodgson became her master.

Disposal: The "Principal Officers and Commissioners of His Majesty's Navy" offered the "Cormorant storeship, of 328 tons", lying at Chatham, for sale on 3 April 1817. She finally sold to Moates, at Chatham, for £1450 on 4 December 1817.

== Blenheim again & fate ==
Blenheim reentered Lloyd's Register in 1818 with Souter, master, S. Moates, owner, and trade London–Honduras. A tremendous gale hit the southeast coast of England on 5 March, damaging or even wrecking many vessels. Blenheim, Souter, master, bound for Honduras, was blown out of The Downs.

The Register of Shipping for 1823 showed Blenheim with Webster, master, S. Moats, owner, and trade Bristol–Jamaica. Lloyd's List reported on 26 March 1822 that Blenheim, "late Webster", master, had departed from Annato Bay, Jamaica, on 10 November 1821 for London. There was no further trace of her and she was presumed to have foundered with the loss of all hands.
