= HMS Advice (1800) =

Royal Navy advice-boat

History

Great Britain
- Name: HMS Advice
- Ordered: 24 May 1800
- Builder: John Randall & Co., Rotherhithe
- Laid down: July 1800
- Launched: 30 December 1800
- Fate: Lost 1804 or sold c.1805

General characteristics
- Class & type: Express-class schooner
- Type: schooner
- Tons burthen: 17848/94 (bm)
- Length: 88 ft 0 in (26.8 m) (overall); 72 ft 7 1/2 in (22.1 m) (keel)
- Beam: 21 ft 6 in (6.6 m)
- Depth of hold: 13 ft 1 in (4.0 m)
- Propulsion: Sails
- Sail plan: Schooner
- Complement: 30
- Armament: 6 × 12-pounder carronades

HMS Advice was the second of a class of two schooner-rigged advice-boats of the Royal Navy. Advice was launched in 1800 and commissioned in January 1801 under Lieutenant William Robertson, for Jersey. In August 1802 she came under the command of Lieutenant Joseph Nourse. Advice (tender), of six cannons, was listed at being at Portsmouth on 2 October 1802, under the command of Lieutenant Nourse. Nourse sailed her for Trinidad, leaving Portsmouth on 27 October. There she served as a tender to the colony.

Advice's subsequent career and fate are uncertain. One source states that Advice's design proved unsatisfactory with the result that not only did the Navy not build any more vessels to that design, no commissioned officers followed Nourse in command of her. However, elsewhere the same source has Nourse commanding and sailing to Trinidad a different advice-boat/tender Advise, being followed in command by Lieutenant J. Salter. However, another source has that Advice being last listed in 1799. That vessel was probably laid up at Portsmouth circa 1800, prior to the launch of the Advice of this article, and was sold in 1807.

On 4 August 1803, Nourse, now a Commander, took command of Cyane. He was probably followed in command of Advice by Lieutenant Salter.

== Fate ==
Advice was last listed in July 1804. Both sources above suggest that she was probably sold in 1805. However, the first of these sources has the previous Advice being lost in the West Indies in 1804.

However, although the most complete listing of Royal Navy losses in the age of sail has no mention of the loss of an HMS Advice after 1793, let alone in the West Indies, newspapers did report such a loss. A letter from an officer in Commodore Hood's squadron at Barbados reported that "The tender Sarah and the Advice brig, Lieutenant Salter, are both lost; but the crews are saved."
