= Rambler (1812 ship) =

History

United States
- Name: Rambler
- Launched: 1812
- Captured: January 1813

United Kingdom
- Name: Rambler
- Owner: 1813:M. Lisk; 1815:Enderby & Sons
- Acquired: Cape of Good Hope by purchase of a prize
- Fate: Wrecked 1825

General characteristics
- Tons burthen: 272, or 273, or 290 (bm)
- Complement: 27 (at loss)
- Armament: 8 × 6-pounder guns

Rambler was launched in America in 1812. The British captured her in 1813 as she was returning to America from Manila. She then briefly became a West Indiaman. In 1815 she became a whaler in the Southern Fishery. She made four complete whaling voyages and was wrecked on her fifth.

== Capture ==
On 1 February 1813 the American ship Rambler arrived at the Cape of Good Hope. She had been sailing from Manila when "The Transport Morley, Brown, Master" had captured her. The Vice admiralty court condemned her as a lawful prize to the Crown, but not Morley as Morley had not acquired a letter of marque. Morley's owners applied for an award. The Treasury agreed, and issued a warrant for £4738 to the Transportation Board on behalf of the owners. The Transportation Board advised the owners that it was keeping the money as Morley had been under contract to it. The owners appealed. It is not clear what the final decision was.

== Voyage to England and West Indiaman ==
On 15 August 1813 Rambler, "Sisk", master, sailed from the Cape of Good Hope bound for St Helena and Britain. The convoy was under the escort of HMS Racehorse.

HMS Cormorant returned to Portsmouth on 18 December. She had sailed from the Cape on 5 September, and from Saint Helena on 23 October. She had been in company with a number of whalers and other vessels. One of the whalers was Cumberland, and one of the other vessels was Rambler.

Rambler, Lisk, master, put into Lisbon on 10 December after having sustained damage to her rigging. Rambler arrived at Gravesend on 25 December.

Rambler appeared in Lloyd's Register (LR) in 1815 with M. Lisk, master and owner, and trade London–Bermuda, changing to Plymouth–South Seas. She was described as having been launched in 1812 in America, and of 273 tons (bm). The 1816 volume still showed M. Lisk as master, but now the owner was Enderbee & Co., and her trade was London–South Seas.

== Whaler ==
Samuel Enderby & Sons purchased Rambler and employed her between 1815 and 1825 on five voyages as a whaler in the Southern Whale Fishery.

In 1813 the British East India Company (EIC) had lost its monopoly on the trade between India and Britain. British ships were then free to sail to India or the Indian Ocean under a licence from the EIC. Rambler's owners applied for a licence on 14 July 1815 to sail her as a whaler in the East Indies and received it that same day.

Whaling voyage #1 (1815-1817): Captain Thomas Folger was reported to have been at the Galapagos Islands on 22 April 1816. He returned to England on 18 July 1817. (Note: Folger was an American from Nantucket. Prior to being captain of Rambler, Folger was captain of several whalers: Vulture (1804–1807), Griffin (1807–1809), Charlton (1809-1810), and Catharine (1811–1812).)

Whaling voyage #2 (1817-1819): Captain Simon Smith sailed from England on 1 September 1817. The vessel had 85 tuns of whale oil aboard when she arrived at Sydney, New South Wales, under Captain Smith, on 25 August 1818. After a month in Port Jackson the vessel left Sydney on 25 September and returned to London on 22 September 1819.

Whaling voyage #3 (1820-1822): Captain Obed Wyer sailed from England on 4 January 1820, bound for New Zealand. On 9 September 1820 the vessel, under Captain Wyer, and with 300 barrels of sperm whale oil aboard, arrived in the Derwent Estuary, Tasmania. While in the river they managed to take two whales very close to Hobert. The vessel departed the Derwent 13 October with four convict stowaways aboard. Rambler arrived at the Bay of Islands, New Zealand, on 27 February 1821. Captain Wyer put the convicts ashore near Cape Bret. Two of them were captured by Māori who were debating on whether to kill them or not when missionary Rev John Butler arrived and begged they be spared. The two convicts were enslaved by the Maori till July 1821 when the Rambler called again at the bay to refresh and, having lost several crewmen at sea, took aboard the two convicts as replacements. The other two convict stowaways were also taken away on whale ships. Rambler called at the Bay of Islands again 5 January 1822 to refresh. During the cruise the vessel was also reported to have also visited the Cape and the Mozambique Channel. Rambler returned to England on 25 October 1822 with 125 tons (350 casks) of sperm oil.

Whaling voyage #4 (1823-1824): Captain George Powell sailed from England on 16 February 1823, bound for the New South Wales fishery. Rambler was off Cape Verde on 29 September and called at the Isle of France (Mauritius) before arriving at Port Jackson on 10 January, departing a month later on 10 February 1824. On 24 April Rambler returned to Sydney under the command of Captain Anthony Holliday. He reported that on 3 April the inhabitants of Vavaʻu, Tonga, had murdered Powell and four other crew members. Two crew members who had gone in the boat with them escaped by swimming to Rambler. Some accounts report that Powell had abused the Tongan's hospitality by firing on them when they refused an exchange of a musket and some flint and powder for five crew members who had deserted. However, a contemporary account (though it incorrectly puts the year of the incident at 1827), suggests a more complicated sequence of events. Rambler returned to England on 29 December.

== Loss ==
Captain Alexander Benjamin Greaves sailed Rambler from London on 12 April 1825, bound for the East Coast of Africa.

Lloyd's List reported on 24 January 1826 that Rambler had been lost off the coast of Madagascar on 10 August 1825. One report has it that she struck a reef off the northwest coast of Madagascar. Captain Greaves and some of his crew were murdered when they reached land. A newspaper report states that Captain Greaves, his second officer, and 11 of the crew were murdered when they went ashore to get refreshments; the first officer and 13 men were saved.
