= List of British whalers captured in the Pacific by David Porter =

In February 1813 Captain David Porter sailed the USS Essex around Cape Horn and cruised the Pacific, warring on British whalers. Over the next year, Porter captured 12 whalers and 360 prisoners. On 28 March 1814 Porter was forced to surrender to Captain James Hillyar after an engagement that became known as the Battle of Valparaiso. He had to surrender to the frigate HMS Phoebe and the sloop-of-war HMS Cherub when Essex became too disabled to offer any resistance. Of the 12 ships Porter captured, only one returned to the United States; seven returned to British control, three were destroyed, and the Chilean government seized one.

Vessel	Master	Captured	Burthen	Men	Cannons	Disposition
Atlantic	Obed Wyer	29 April 1813	353	24	8	Recaptured 28 March 1814 and sent as a cartel to New York. She arrived there in July, where the marshal of the district seized her. She was condemned, and sold for US$25,000 on 26 August.
Catharine (1809 ship)	Thomas Folger	28 May 1813	270	29	8	Her captors burnt her off Valparaiso in February 1814
Charlton (1803 ship)	Sinclair Halcrow	Mid-July 1813	274	21	10	Turned over to the crews and sailed back to England as a cartel
Georgiana (1791 ship)	W. Pitt	23 April 1813	280	25	6	Became USS Georgiana; On 28 November 1813, HMS Barrosa recaptured Georgiana and sent her into Bermuda
Greenwich (1800 ship)	Shuttleworth	28 May 1813	338	25	10	Her captors burnt Greenwich at Nuku Hiva
Hector (1809 ship)	J. Richards	28 May 1813	270	25	11	Taken into Valparaiso and burnt there on 14 February 1814 when she proved unsaleable
Montezuma (1804 ship)	David Baxter	29 April 1813	270	21	2	In spring 1814 the Chilean government seized her at Valparaiso, where she was laid up, and sold her, retaining the proceeds
New Zealander (1808 ship)	Donnemann (or George Denman, or Donneman)	Mid-July 1813	259	23	8	On 21 April 1814, HMS Belvidera recaptured New Zealander on 21 April 1814 as she was one day out of arriving at New York
Policy (1801 ship)	J. Bowman; Johnstone	29 April 1813	175	26	10	On 4 (or 11) December 1813 HMS Ramillies and Loire recaptured Policy and sent her into Halifax, Nova Scotia.
Rose (1806 ship)	Munro (or Mark Monroe)	29 April 1813	220	21	8	Given up to captured crews and sent for England but had to put into Lima leaky; arrived in England March 1814
Seringapatam (1799 ship)	William Stavers	13 July 1813	357	31	14	USS Seringapatam; recaptured by mutineers who sailed her to Port Jackson. From there she was brought to England, where her owners reclaimed her on payment of salvage.
Sir Andrew Hammond (1800 ship)	William Porter	13 September 1813	301	31	12	USS Sir Andrew Hammond; HMS Cherub recaptured Sir Andrew Hammond on 12 June 1814
