= Action off James Island =

1813 naval engagement between Britain and the United States

- Part of the War of 1812
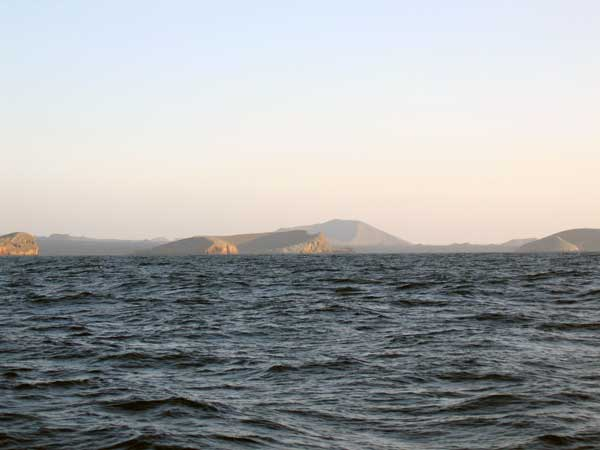
- James Island from the south in 2008.
Date	May 28, 1813
Location	off James Island, Galapagos Archipelago, Pacific Ocean
Result	American victory

Belligerents
United States	United Kingdom

Commanders and leaders
John Downes	None

Strength
1 sloop	3 whaling brigs

Casualties and losses
None	2 killed 6 wounded 75 captured 3 brigs captured
- Seventy-five prisoners were taken by the Americans and freed after the battle.

The action off James Island was a naval engagement of the War of 1812. In May 1813 an American frigate captured three British whalers off James Island in the South Pacific. Only one of the whalers resisted and the resultant single-ship action was one of the few fought in Pacific waters during the war. The British later recovered all the whalers involved.

== Background ==
Following Captain David Porter's passage of Cape Horn in USS Essex a year earlier, the United States Navy vessel focused on commerce raiding by attacking British whalers off the coast of South America. After taking several vessels, Captain Porter made a prize of Georgiana, a 280-ton sloop. Georgiana initially carried two guns but Porter increased her armament to six 18-pounders, four swivel guns, and six blunderbusses. He placed Lieutenant John Downes in command and gave him a crew of forty-two navy men and six volunteers, recently captured American sailors. Porter then instructed Downes to harass the British off James Island in the Galapagos chain.

== Action ==
Leaving Essex on May 12, Downes headed in a southern direction for James. While nearing the island in the afternoon on May 28, lookouts aboard Georgiana sighted a mast and sails on the horizon. In fact the sails belonged to two brigs, the 270-ton whaler Catharine, accompanied by the 220-ton whaler Rose. Downes ordered his men to give chase and raised the Union Jack to trick the whalers into believing that they were not under threat. When the Americans were within range they lowered a few boats filled with men and captured the two sloops without resistance. Later the British captains revealed to Downes that they did not realize they were being attacked until after the Americans were on deck.

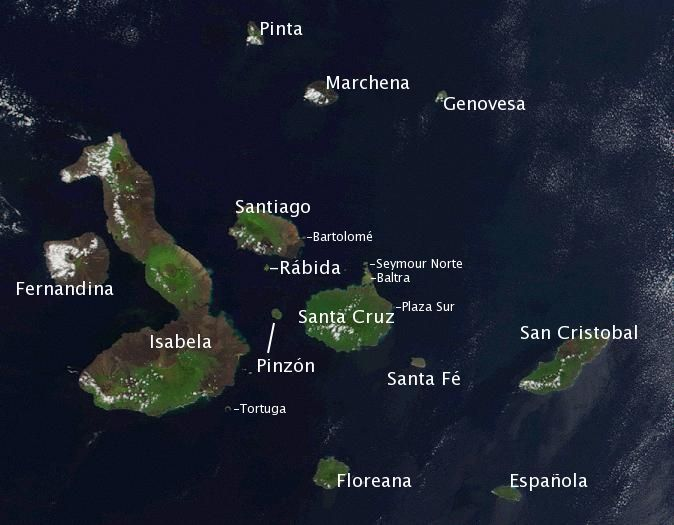
A map of the Galapagos; James island is now known as Santiago.

On board the two vessels were a total of sixteen guns, eight each, and fifty sailors, whom the Americans took prisoner. But just as the capture of Rose and Catherine was completed, a third vessel was spotted, it was Hector, armed with eleven guns and crewed by twenty-five men. Georgiana maneuvered to pursue and after several moments of chasing, the sun had gone down before the Americans were in firing range. In the dark, Georgiana fired a warning shot at Hector, which responded with inaccurate broadsides. The Americans then engaged and began raking the British vessel, ripping off its main mast and most of the rigging. Four more broadsides followed and when it seemed as though the whaler's fire had weakened, Georgiana moved in to board. Just as the Americans drew near, the British lowered their colors and surrendered so the boarding took place without hostilities.

Two British sailors had been killed and six others seriously wounded. Apparently all of the British shots passed over Georgiana or fell short. Thus the Americans reported no damage or casualties.

== Aftermath ==
Seventy-five prisoners were taken but because there were fewer than fifty Americans to guard them, Lieutenant Downes disarmed Rose and transferred the prisoners to her. They were then released on parole and ordered to Saint Helena. Georgiana returned to Essex, which was anchored of Tumbez, Peru, on 24 June. On the same day as the action, David Porter captured two more whalers without incident, Montezuma (18 guns), and Greenwich (10 guns). Captain Porter was now in command of nine armed vessels in the Pacific. Lieutenant Downes was promoted on November 28, 1813, for gallantry in his many actions against the British and the natives of Nuka Hiva.

The British later recaptured all three whalers and returned them to whaling. HMS Barrosa recaptured Georgiana in the Atlantic on 28 November 1813, and sent her into Bermuda.

== Note ==
Only Rose was sailing under a letter of marque, which Captain Mark Munro had received on 15 August 1811. It described Rose as of 245 tons (bm), with a crew of 24 men, and armed with eight 12 and 9-pounder guns. By virtue of the letter, she was authorized to engage in offensive action. The other two British whalers, Catherine and Hector, were legally only allowed to use their armament in self-defense.
