= Action of 2 June 1803 =

- Part of First Barbary War
Date	2 June 1803
Location	Near Tripoli (present day Libya)
Result	Tripolitanian victory

Belligerents
United States	Tripolitania

Commanders and leaders
David Porter (WIA); James Lawrence; John Downes	Unknown

Strength
50 men 9 boats	1,000 men

Casualties and losses
15 killed or wounded	Unknown

The Action of 2 June 1803 was a military engagement between the US Navy and the Tripolitans during the First Barbary War. The Americans launched a raid to burn Tripolitan vessels carrying wheat. The raid ended in failure, and the wheat cargo was saved.

== Prelude ==
On June 1, 1803, the USS Enterprise gave signals to the USS New York that 10 small Tripolitan merchant ships were carrying wheat about 35 miles northwest of the city and that USS Adams was watching them. The US ships gave them chase and forced them to run aground. At the scene, around 1,000 Tripolitan men were gathered at the merchant ships, which ran aground to protect them from the Americans. The commodore, Richard Valentine Morris, ordered a reconnaissance. David Porter had a boat with five men and spectated the area during the night. He went back and told the commodore that landing was advisable.

== Raid ==
The next day, nine boats carrying 50 were entrusted with this mission, led by David Porter. Their mission was to burn the wheat and prevent the supplies from reaching Tripoli. In the daylight, the mission began. The US boats arrived within the range of fire. They were met with heavy fire. The Americans returned heavy fire as well. As the Americans were approaching, they began sustaining casualties. David was wounded in his right and left thighs. The Americans landed and fought their way to their targets. The Americans were so close; however, they were attacked by 5 or 6 Tripolitans from behind. They began firing their muskets against them until all of them were shot down.

The Americans began boarding the vessels, set fire to them, and retreated. The Tripolitans, however, quickly left their breastworks and reached their ships, extinguishing the fires and saving their cargo. Thus the American raid ended in failure. The Americans suffered 15 killed or wounded during the battle, while Tripolitan casualties were unknown.

== Aftermath ==
The raid was the first amphibious assault ever made by the Americans on Tripoli shores. The raid ended in failure, as the majority of the wheat cargo survived and did little to force Yusuf Karamanli into submission. David Porter has asked the commodore for another attempt, but the commodore refused, saying it was dangerous, and abandoned the attempt. Among the notable who participated in the raid alongside David Porter, was Lieutenant James Lawrence, and the midshipman John Downes

== Sources ==
- Joshua London (2011), Victory in Tripoli, How America's War with the Barbary Pirates Established the U.S. Navy and Shaped a Nation.
- US Government Printing Office (1940), Naval Documents related to the United States Wars with the Barbary Powers, Vol II.
- Molly Elliot Seawell (1897), Twelve Naval Captains, Being a Record of Certain Americans who Made Themselves Immortal.
- Edgar Stanton Maclay (1898), A history of the United States navy, with technical revision by R.C. Smith, Vol I.
