= Micaela Cáceres =

Chilean trade unionist and feminist (1850-?)

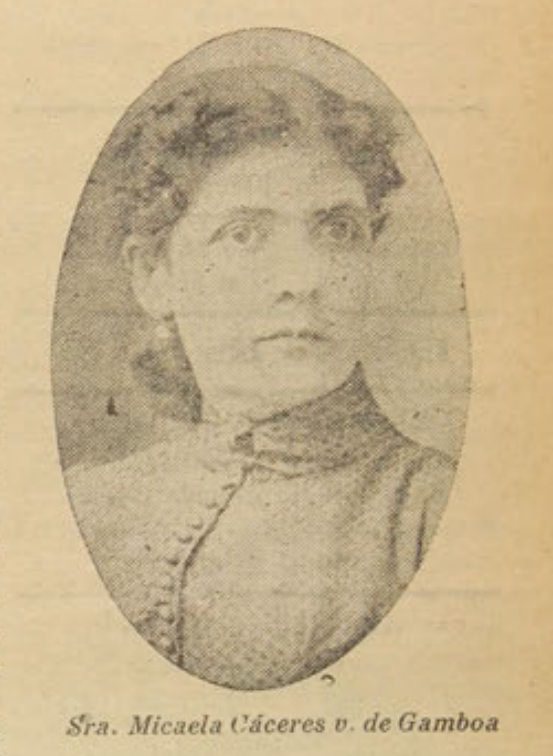
- Born: Valparaíso, Chile
- Occupations: Worker, seamstress, trade unionist

Micaela Cáceres de Gamboa (born in Valparaíso, c. 1850) was a Chilean worker, seamstress, trade unionist, and feminist. In 1887, she founded the Sociedad de Obreras Mutualistas (Society of Women Mutual Workers), the first trade union of working women in South America.

== Early life and career ==
Born in Valparaiso, Cáceres worked as an employee in a fashion workshop named "Casa Günther".

She founded the first women's trade union in Chile in 1887, after one of her coworkers at “Casa Günter” died because she could not afford her medical expenses. Eight days after her death, with the support of the Sociedad Filarmónica de Obreros of Valparaíso, Micaela managed to gather more than 150 working women from the city to formally establish the Sociedad de Obreras de Socorros Mutuos de Valparaíso in 1887.

The Sociedad de Obreras—as it later came to be known—was founded 34 years after the creation of the Unión Tipográfica de Santiago, established in 1853 and recognized as Chile's first trade union organization. Women were not included in any of the societies that emerged from this union.

This organization was initially called the Sociedad de Obreras de Socorros Mutuos (Society of Women Workers for Mutual Aid), later known as the Sociedad de Obreras Mutualistas. It was officially founded on November 13, 1887, with Cáceres serving as its first president.

Micaela Cáceres is buried in Cemetery No. 2 on Panteón Hill in Valparaíso.

== Honors ==
In 1955, the Municipality of Valparaíso erected a bust in her honor, created by Chilean sculptor Heraldo Orrego Soto. She is commemorated there as a “pioneer of South American female mutualism.”
