= Cementerio Nᵒ 1 de Valparaíso =

Cemetery in Valparaíso, Chile

Coordinates: 33.0446°S 71.6253°W

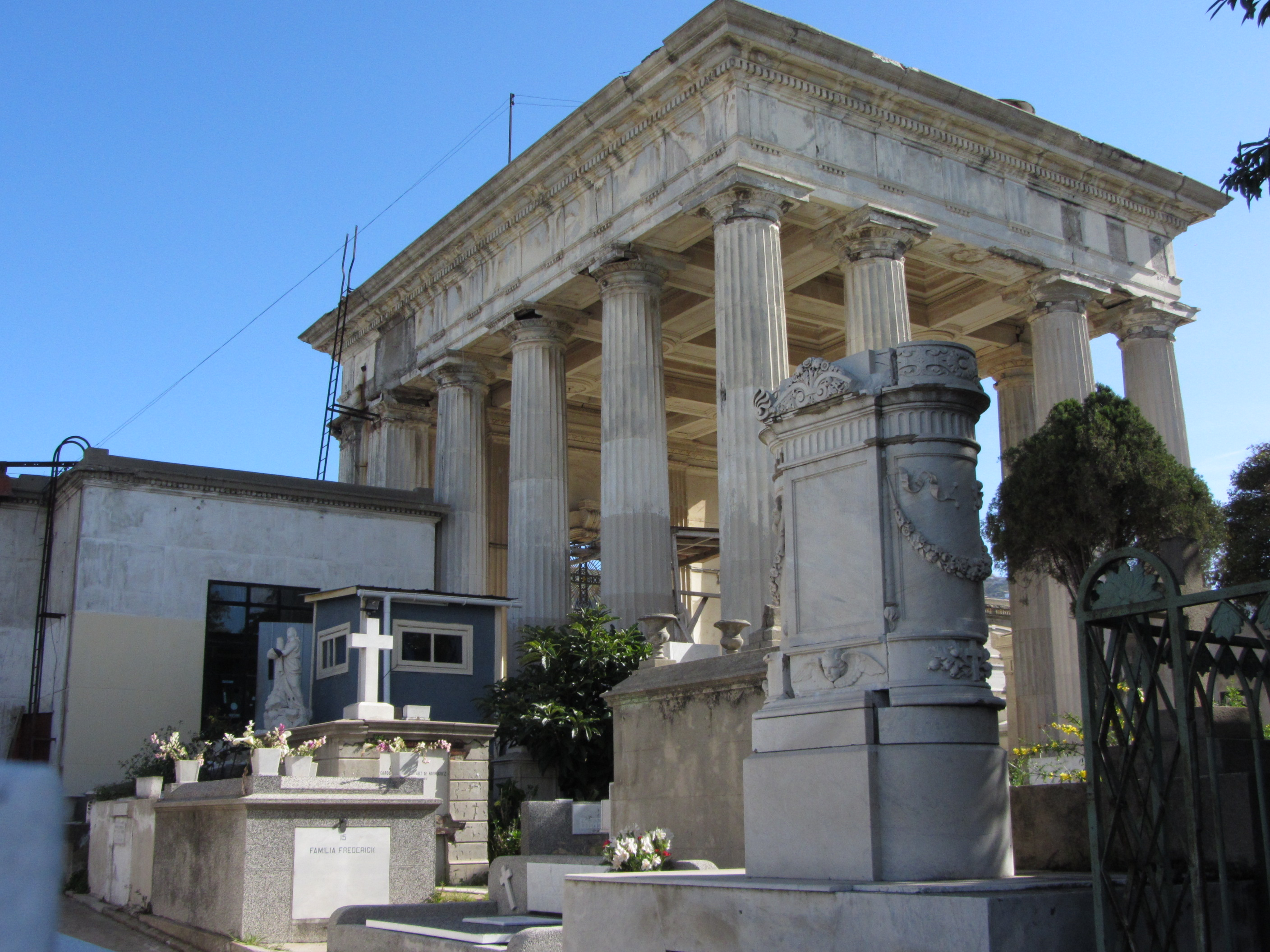
- Interactive map of the Cementerio Nᵒ 1 de Valparaíso area

The Cementerio Nᵒ 1 de Valparaíso is a cemetery located in the Panteón Hill, immediately north of the Cementerio de Disidentes, in Valparaíso, Chile. Created in 1825, it was declared as a National Monument of Chile in 2005, within the category of Historic Monuments.

== History ==
Before the creation of the cemetery, the people were buried, according to the colonial-era traditions, in mass graves located next to churches and convents. The poorest people were buried on unpopulated ravines. The founding of public cemeteries in Chile began under the government of Bernardo O'Higgins, who created the Cementerio General de Santiago. On December 3, 1821, a project was presented to create a cemetery in Valparaíso on a small hill in the outskirts of the city, which was later named Cerro Panteón. The project was supported by governor José Ignacio Zenteno.

Historical documents show that the cemetery was operating in 1825, and that it was exclusively a Catholic cemetery until 1883. In April 1885 a storm caused a landslide that dragged several coffins into the houses located on the slopes of the hill, killing some residents. The 1906 Valparaíso earthquake destroyed the chapel of the cemetery, which was built in 1835, the entrance's clock tower and the mausoleum that contained the heart of Diego Portales.

In 1922 a portico entrance was built by Swiss architect Augusto Geiger, and was installed a replica of the Pietà donated by Juan Brown, which was brought from Rome.

== Description ==
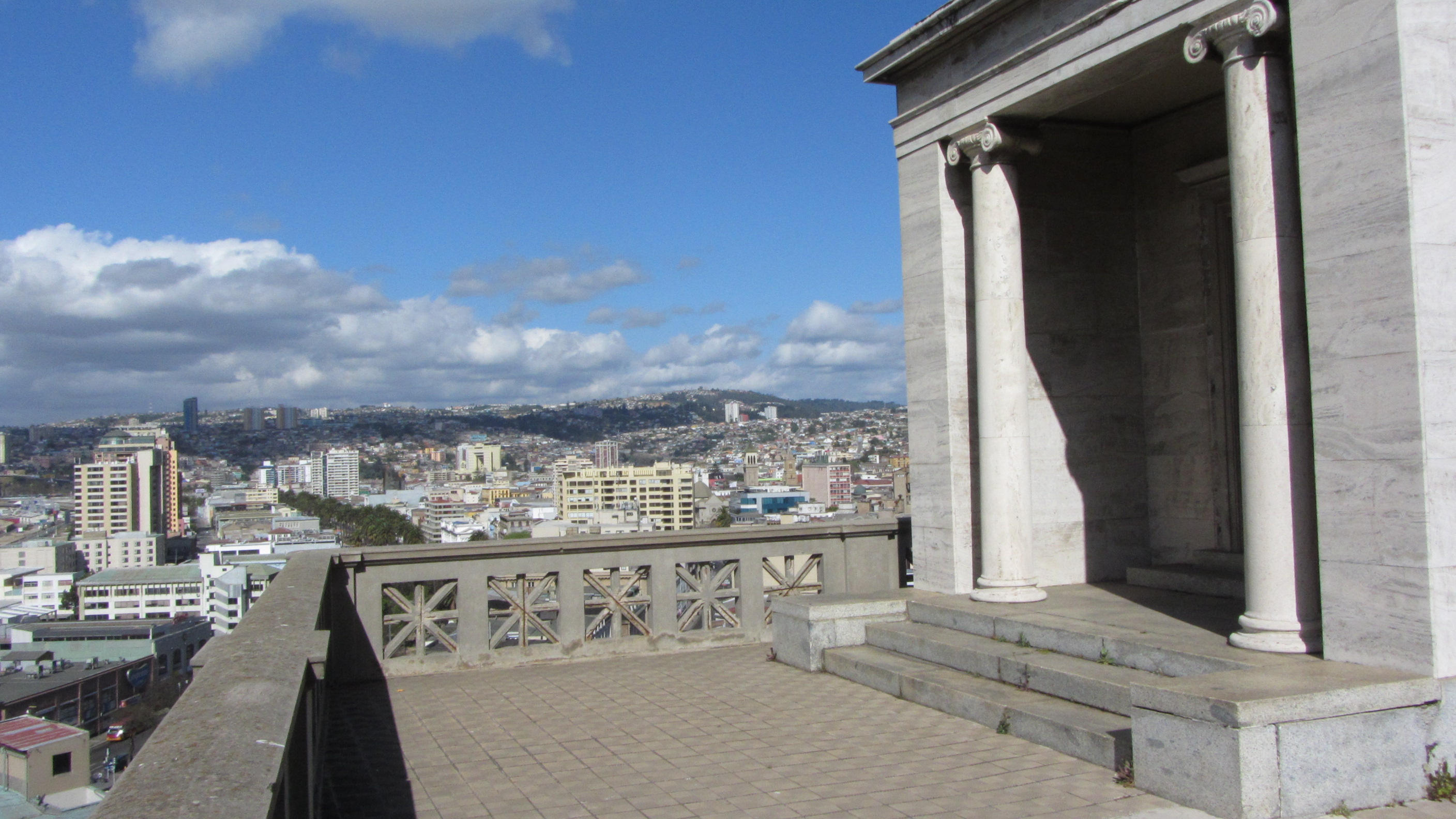
Pascual Baburizza's mausoleum

Located on a terrace of the cerro Panteón, the cemetery features a portico entrance, which is located directly across the street from the entrance to the Cementerio de Disidentes. This Greek temple-like gate was built in the Neo-classical style with fluted Doric columns. The portico contains a replica of the Pietà by Michelangelo.

A balconied viewpoint, which is adjacent to the mausoleum of Pascual Baburizza, is reached after traversing a network of pathways surrounded by mausoleums, graves and epitaphs. The tombs are built in various architectural styles including Neo-gothic and Neo-classical. Numerous stained glass artworks can be found here.
