= USS Downes =

Three ships of the United States Navy have been named Downes, in honor of Captain John Downes.

- USS Downes (DD-45), a Cassin-class destroyer, commissioned in 1915, transferred to the United States Coast Guard and finally sold in 1934.
- USS Downes (DD-375), a Mahan-class destroyer, commissioned in 1936 and decommissioned in 1945.
- USS Downes (FF-1070), a Knox-class frigate, commissioned in 1971 and decommissioned in 1992.
