= Epervier =

Epervier may refer to the following ships:

- Epervier, a French brig-sloop operating as a privateer when captured by the British in 1797
- Epervier, a French Navy brig-sloop captured by the British in 1803
- HMS Epervier, the name of various ships of the British Royal Navy
- USS Epervier (1814), a United States Navy sloop-of-war in commission from 1814 to 1815
