= Hector (1809 ship) =

History

United Kingdom
- Name: Hector
- Acquired: 1809 by purchase of a prize
- Fate: Captured and burnt 1814

General characteristics
- Tons burthen: 262, or 263 (bm)
- Complement: 25
- Armament: 1 × 12-pounder + 6 × 6-pounder guns + 4 × 18-pounder guns "of the New Construction"

Hector was a 19th-century ship that the British captured around 1809. She became a West Indiaman, making at least one voyage to Hayti. New owners in 1811 sent her off to the Pacific to engage in whale hunting. There the Spanish detained her, but then released her. Next, the United States Navy captured her in an engagement. Her captors took her into Valparaiso, where they burnt her in February 1814.

== Career ==
Hector first appeared in Lloyd's Register in 1809 with Pringle, master, Henry & Co., owners, and trade London–West Indies. It also noted that she had undergone small repairs. She sailed from Gravesend on 6 June 1809 for Hayti. The volume for 1810 showed her master changing from Pringle to W. Pixley. The Register of Shipping for 1811 showed her master changing from W. Pixley to J. Richards, her owner from Henry & Co. to Gibbons, and her trade from London–Hayti to London–South Seas.

On 13 August 1811 Hector, Richards, master, was at Plymouth, having come from London on her way to the South Seas. Captain Richards sailed Hector to the Peruvian coast. On 3 October she was at Rio de Janeiro. By 30 May 1812 she was off the coast by Lima with 30 tons of whale oil.

Early in 1813 the Spanish privateer Santa Teresa detained Hector off Peru's Punta Aguja on suspicion of dealing in contraband. Richards had on board 900 pesos whose origin he could not explain. On 30 January a Naval Court liberated Hector, but fined Richards 500 pesos. The court then reduced the fine to 300 pesos in response to his pleas and in consideration of the alliance between Spain and England. Shortly thereafter Hector returned to whaling. Lloyd's List reported that Hector had been liberated in March.

In the action off James Island on 28 May 1813 Lieutenant John Downes, of the U.S. Navy, in the captured British whaler Georgiana, exchanged broadsides with Hector. Hector struck after she had suffered two dead and six wounded; the Americans suffered no casualties. Downes put all his prisoners, including those he had captured earlier, on the captured whaler Rose and sent her to Saint Helena. Before he did so, he had the prisoners swear not to take up arms against the United States until they had been formally exchanged, and he further threw her guns overboard, as well as her cargo of sperm oil. Lloyd's List reported that the American sent Hector and another vessel captured on the 28th, Catharine, to Tombus. It further reported that although Rose had been sent for England, she proved leaky and had to put into Lima.

Actually, Downes sailed Georgiana, Catherine, and Hector to rendezvous with Captain Porter and the USS Essex there. Eventually Downes and Porter met and Porter re-arranged his forces and his prizes. He then sent Downes in Essex Junior to Valparaiso with the prizes Hector, Catherine, Policy, and Montezuma, and the American ship Barclay, with the instructions to leave Barclay there and to sell the prizes. Downes was unable to sell Hector, Catherine, and Montezuma.

== Fate ==
Porter and Essex eventually came into Valparaiso. There, on 14 February 1814, Essex towed Hector out to sea and burned her.
