= Dissidents Courtyard =

Protestant cemetery in Santiago, Chile

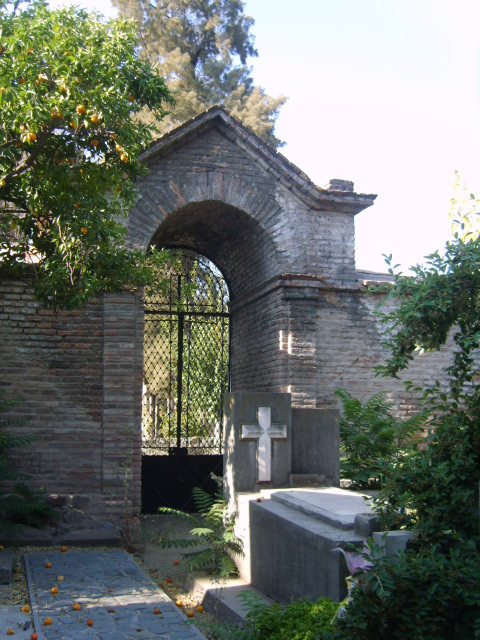
The main entrance to the courtyard

The Dissidents’ Courtyard (Spanish: Patio de los Disidentes) is a historic burial ground located within the General Cemetery of Santiago, Chile. It was established in 1854, during a period when the Roman Catholic Church held the status of official state religion. As non-Catholics were denied burial in consecrated cemeteries, the courtyard was created to provide a resting place for Protestants, freethinkers, and other religious minorities. The site reflects Chile’s 19th-century religious and social divisions and is notable for its distinctive architecture and the graves of prominent foreign immigrants and local figures outside the Catholic tradition. Today it is recognized as part of the cultural and historical heritage of the General Cemetery.

== History ==
In 1854, the Catholic Church authorized the creation of this sector within the General Cemetery of Santiago as a small and tightly confined enclosure, surrounded by walls measuring about seven meters (23 feet) in height and three meters (10 feet) in thickness. At the time, Catholic ecclesiastical authorities regarded the deceased who did not profess the Catholic faith as “profane” and therefore believed they could “contaminate” the rest of the Catholic tombs. The Dissidents’ Courtyard was thus designated as a separate burial ground for non-Catholics, reflecting the Catholic privileges in Chilean society.

The vast majority of graves in the Dissidents’ Courtyard belong to Protestants, primarily of German and British origin, who, prior to the creation of this sector, were often buried informally on the slopes of Santa Lucía Hill. The site also contains some Jewish graves; the Jewish community did not have a dedicated cemetery in Santiago until 1932, following the formal separation of church and state in 1925.

Among the most notable graves are those of the evangelical preacher Canut of Bon, as well as the Lutheran scientist Rodolfo Amando Philippi.

== See also ==
- Dissidents Cemetery
