= USS Downes (DD-45) =

Cassin-class destroyer

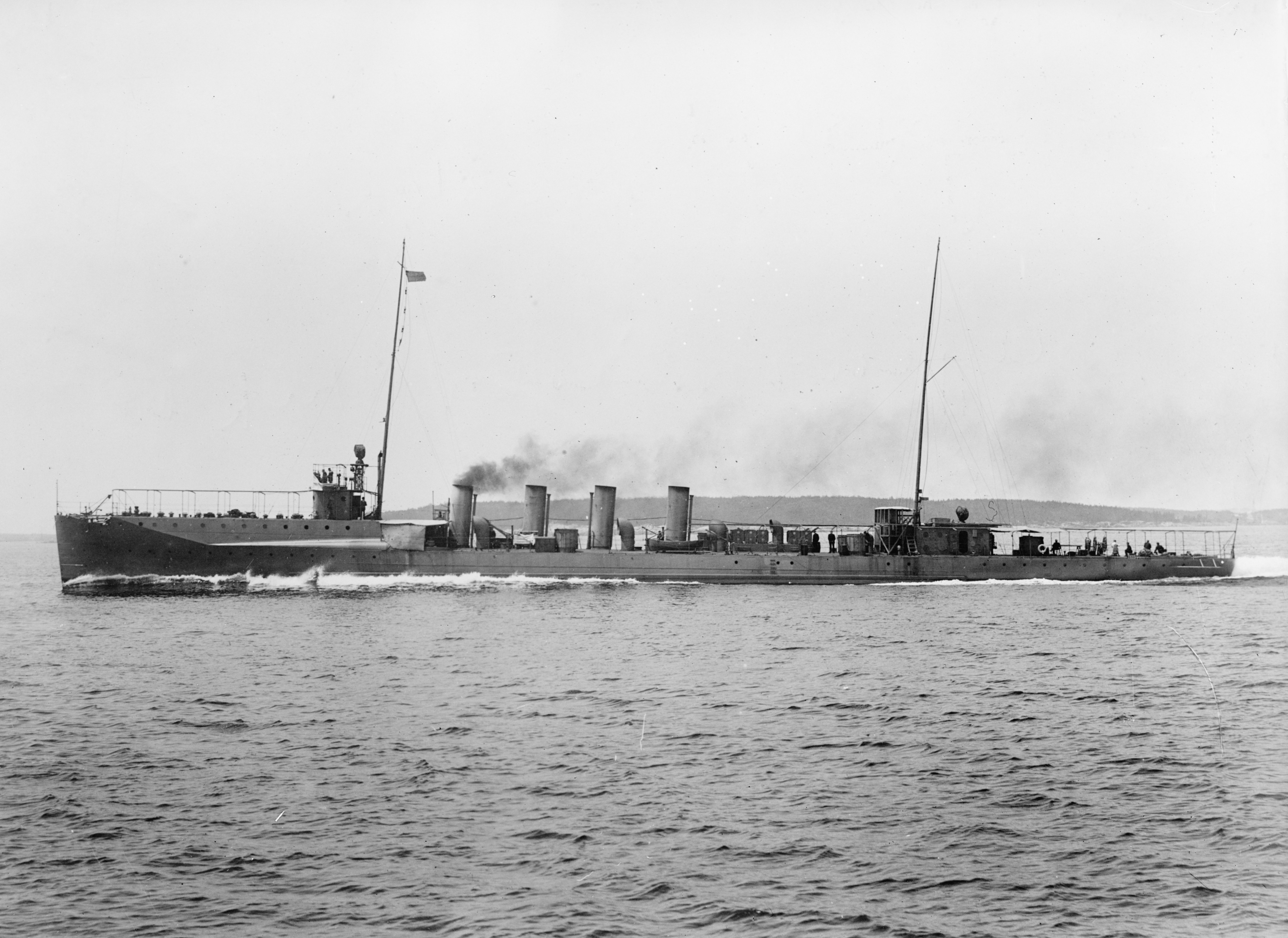
- USS Downes (DD-45) underway in 1915 undergoing sea trials.

History

United States
- Name: Downes
- Namesake: Captain John Downes
- Builder: New York Shipbuilding Company, Camden, New Jersey
- Cost: $805,490.17
- Laid down: 27 June 1912
- Launched: 8 November 1913
- Sponsored by: Mrs. M. H. Simons, great-granddaughter of Captain Downes
- Commissioned: 11 February 1915
- Decommissioned: 6 June 1922
- Stricken: 5 July 1934
- Identification: Hull symbol:DD-45; Code letters:NIN
- Fate: Transferred to the United States Coast Guard, 28 April 1924; Sold 22 August 1934, broken up for scrap
- Notes: Downes lost her name to new construction 1 July 1933

United States
- Name: Downes
- Acquired: 28 April 1924
- Commissioned: 14 October 1924
- Decommissioned: 18 November 1930
- Identification: Hull symbol:CG-4
- Fate: Returned to the Navy on 22 May 1931.

General characteristics
- Class & type: Cassin-class destroyer
- Displacement: 1,072 long tons (1,089 t)
- Length: 305 ft 3 in (93.04 m)
- Beam: 31 ft 2 in (9.50 m)
- Draft: 9 ft 7 in (2.92 m) (mean)
- Installed power: oil fired boilers; 16,000 ihp (12,000 kW)
- Propulsion: 2 × Direct Drive Turbines With Triple Expansion Cruising Engines; 2 × shafts
- Speed: 29.5 kn (33.9 mph; 54.6 km/h); 29 kn (33 mph; 54 km/h) (Speed on Trial)
- Complement: 5 officers 96 enlisted (USN); 6 officers, 82 enlisted (USCG)
- Armament: USN: 4 × 4 in (100 mm)/50 caliber guns; 8 × 18-inch (450 mm) torpedo tubes (4 × 2); USCG: 3 × 4 in (100 mm)/50 cal guns; 1 × 1-pdr

The first USS Downes (DD-45) was a Cassin-class destroyer in the United States Navy during World War I. She was later transferred to the United States Coast Guard, where she was designated CG-4. She was named for Captain John Downes.

== Construction ==
Downes was launched on 8 November 1913 by New York Shipbuilding Company of Camden, New Jersey. She was sponsored by Mrs. M. H. Simons, great-granddaughter of Captain Downes and outfitted for service at Philadelphia Navy Yard. Downes was commissioned on 11 February 1915.

== World War I ==
Downes conducted her shakedown off New York and in Chesapeake Bay, and then returned to Philadelphia Navy Yard, where she was placed in ordinary from 4 October 1915 – 26 May 1917 for the construction and installation of new machinery by the contractor. Fitted out for distant service, she sailed from New York on 18 October 1917 for Devonport, England, arriving on 7 November.

Downes was based at Queenstown, Ireland, from 17 November 1917 – 5 December 1918, and operated on convoy escort duty inbound to British ports, across the channel, and outbound to rendezvous with the ocean escorts. She patrolled against submarines off the Irish coast, making numerous attacks with no sure results and with other destroyers aided distressed ships. On two occasions her efficiency won commendations from the British Admiralty, once for her protection of the torpedoed Manley and again for the rescue and salvage of a British submarine.

== Inter-war period ==
Downes arrived at Brest, France on 6 December to meet and escort President Woodrow Wilson embarked in George Washington, passing in review before returning to Queenstown on 14 December. The day after Christmas she sailed for the United States, arriving at Norfolk, Virginia on 18 January 1919. After winter maneuvers in Cuban waters, she returned to New York on 14 March. Downes reported to Norfolk on 5 May for overhaul and on 31 May was placed in ordinary. Returned to full commission, she sailed for Newport, Rhode Island on 12 May 1921 for summer maneuvers.

From 22 October – 20 March 1922, she lay at Charleston, South Carolina, and on 24 March arrived at Philadelphia Navy Yard. Downes was placed out of commission there on 6 June and laid up.

She was transferred to the United States Coast Guard on 28 April 1924. She initially served at the Academy as a practice ship. Later, she was part of the Rum Patrol. Returned to Naval custody at Philadelphia on 22 May 1931, Downes was scrapped and sold on 22 August 1934 in accordance with the London Naval Treaty.
