= Experiment (1798 ship) =

History

Great Britain
- Name: Experiment
- Owner: 1798:Robert Wigram; 1808: Barkworth & Co., Kingston upon Hull
- Builder: Thomas Haw, Stockton-on-Tees
- Launched: 17 July 1798
- Fate: Condemned at Batavia in 1818 and sold there in 1819 for breaking up

General characteristics
- Tons burthen: 500, or 560, or 568, or 58138/94 (bm)
- Propulsion: Sail
- Complement: 1800:35; 1803:45
- Armament: 1800:16 × 12&4-pounder cannons; 1801:8 × 6-pounder guns + 8 × 12-pounder guns ("of the New Construction"); 1803:2 × 6-pounder guns + 12 × 18-pounder carronades

Experiment was launched in 1798 at Stockton-on-Tees, England. Between late 1800 and 1802 she made a voyage to India for the British East India Company (EIC). In 1803 she transported convicts to Port Jackson. In 1805, on her way home the French captured her, but the British recaptured her. In 1808 she became a West Indiaman. Still, in 1818 or so she sailed out to India. Experiment was condemned at Batavia in 1818 and sold there in 1819 for breaking up.

== Early career ==
Experiment entered Lloyd's Register in 1799 with Aldis, master, R. Wigram, owner, and trade London—Jamaica. In 1800 her master was Aldis, changing to N. White.

Captain John Nelson Whyte acquired a letter of marque on 28 November 1800. The Register of Shipping for 1801 showed Experiment's master as J. White, and her trade as London—Bengal.

On 30 December 1800 Captain John Nelson Whyte sailed from the Downs, bound for Madras and Bengal. Mr. Robert Wigram had tendered her to the EIC to bring back rice from Bengal. She was one of 28 vessels that sailed on that mission between December 1800 and February 1801. She arrived at Calcutta on 30 April 1801.

Experiment reached Madras on 23 May 1801, and arrived at Calcutta on 9 June. Homeward bound, she was at Kedgeree on 11 September and the Cape of Good Hope on 22 December. She reached St Helena on 2 February 1802, and arrived at the Downs on 31 March.

== Convict voyage and capture (1803-1805) ==
Under the command of Francis J. Withers, Experiment sailed from Cowes, England on 4 December 1803. She sailed under a letter of marque issued to "Francis McWither" on 4 October 1803.

She left in company with Coromandel, which was also carrying convicts to Port Jackson. While sailing in the Bay of Biscay (or 16 leagues from the Isles of Scilly, Experiment sprang her bowsprit and had her main top gallant mast carried away, during a gale. She limped back to Cowes to repair the damage and after repairs were affected, she sailed again on 2 January 1804, in company with the whaler Policy, bound for the Moluccas. Experiment arrived at Rio de Janeiro on 8 March and left on 8 April. She arrived at Port Jackson on 12 June 1804.

Experiment embarked two male and 136 female convicts. Six female convicts died on the voyage.

Experiment left Port Jackson on 7 October bound for China.

While Experiment was on her homeward passage from China to London, carrying a cargo of tea for the EIC, the French privateer Napoleon, of Saint-Malo, captured her. Napoleon encountered Experiment on 27 May 1805 at 37°0′S 22°30′E and captured her after a 30-hour chase. Napoleon, which was under the command of Captain Malo le Nourville, was heavily armed. She had sixteen 32-pounder and four 18-pounder guns on the main deck, and two 36-pounder on 6-pounder guns on the upper deck. She also had a crew of 200 men. After an engagement of half-an-hour, Experiment had three men badly wounded, her tiller shot away, some 32 shot between wind and water, and two feet of water in her hold. Withers therefore struck her flag. Napoleon was four months out of False Bay and Experiment was her first prize.

An item in the Times dated 11 September 1805 simply reported that Experiment had parted from Ocean off the Cape of Good Hope and had not been seen since. On 13 September 1805 Lloyd's List reported that a large French privateer from Saint-Malo had captured Experiment as the privateer was on her way to Île de France and had taken her into the Cape of Good Hope. The crew had arrived at St Helena.

The French sent Withers, the surgeon, and the Fourth Officer to Île de France in Experiment. Napoleon then took the remaining officers and the purser to the Cape of Good Hope. There they were able to arrange for a cartel to take them to St Helena.

The EIC valued at £45,604 its cargo lost when the French captured her.

On 3 August 1805, HMS Calcutta, under the command of Captain Woodriff, left St Helena as escort of a motley convoy to England. The convoy consisted of the East India company's "extra-ship" Indus, from Madras, the southern whaler African from Desolation, the whaler Fox from the Mozambique channel, the whaler Grand Sachem from the Peruvian coast and bound to Milford, the Prussian ship Wilhelmina, which Calcutta had detained on her way out to St Helena, and the large Swedish ship Carolina, which was sailing from China and asked to join. The men from Experiment sailed on African.

On 26 September the convoy encountered Allemand's squadron. Woodriff succeeded in drawing the French away from the convoy, but at the cost of his ship, which the French captured.

Apparently the French eventually sent Experiment into Cape Town. There, the British retook her, as her captors did not know that the British had occupied the Cape.

== Later career ==
In 1808 Barkworth & Co., Hull, purchased Experiment for use as a West Indiaman. She first reappeared in Lloyd's Register for 1809 with T. Forest, master, and trade London-Cuba.

Year	Master	Owner	Trade
1810	T. Forest	Barkworth	London—Cuba; London—Jamaica
1815	T. Hardy	Barkworth	Hull—London
1819	G. Dacres	Barkworth	London—India

== Fate ==
Lloyd's List reported on 7 September 1819 that Experiment, Dacre, master, of Hull, had been condemned at Batavia in December 1818. She was sold on 10 March 1819 for 5000 Java rupees to be broken up.
