= Canut of Bon =

Spanish preacher (1846–1896)

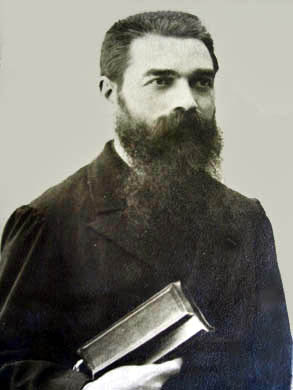
- Born: John Baptist Canut of Bon Gil; 30 September 1846; Valencia, Spain
- Died: 9 November 1896 (aged 50); Santiago, Chile

John Baptist Canut of Bon Gil (30 September 1846 – 9 November 1896) was a Spanish preacher, best known for spreading his Protestant faith and founding evangelical churches in Chile during the nineteenth century.

== Background ==
At age 18, John Canut of Bon entered the Society of Jesus in Balaguer, Leida. It is likely that he was of low socioeconomic status and was in training to become a tailor. After two years of training, he declared his religious vows and was sent to the Jesuit College of Tortosa by the tailor shop he was working at.

The political situation in Spain at the time (Carlist Wars between clergy and laity) made it difficult for Canut of Bon to stay in the country, so he was reassigned to Argentina where he learned homeopathy. He later moved to Chile and then retired from the Jesuit Order in 1871, not because he lost his Catholic faith, but because he wanted to study. In 1872, he settled in The Andes where he devoted himself to the sale of fabrics and continued to work as a tailor. On August 5 of that year, he married Virginia Aguilar Robles, with whom he had ten children.

In December 1876, he found a copy of the New Testament on a platform of a railway station in Quillota from the Bible Society of Valparaiso. He defined this episode as the first meeting he had with the Gospel. In 1880, he had the opportunity to meet a Presbyterian preacher named Robert MacLean, with whom he became friends. Canut of Bon then went on to become the first Spanish-speaking preacher in Chile.

His preaching in a country that was mostly Catholic led him to become a sort of outcast amongst from the foreign Presbyterians who feared deportation from Chile for violating the rules contained in the Constitution of 1833, which gave priority to the Official State Church over other religions. Canut of Bon was soon expelled from his new religion for persisting in bitter debates in his preaching.

He asked for a reinstatement to the Catholic Church in 1884 in Curico. However, his "Catholic Period" came to an end in 1888, when he met an American Methodist pastor named William Taylor (1821–1902) who preached in Africa and India between 1856 and 1883. In 1890, Canut of Bon was consecrated as bishop of the Methodist faith. His way of preaching, which was spirited and filled with knowledge, attracted many. However, this also meant that many enemies and his previous clients abandoned him. Despite this, he began to preach full-time, relying on his knowledge in the field of homeopathy to stay in the area. To avoid rejection from the Catholic priests, he enlarged his preaching territory to southern cities and places where the Catholic Church had much less of an influence. For five years, he preached the Gospel and founded churches in Coquimbo, La Serena, Concepcion, Traiguen, Angol, Los Angeles, Victoria, and Temuco.

Unfortunately, in 1896, he had to move to Santiago for health reasons where he died on November 9. His remains rest in the Patio of Dissenters of the General Cemetery of Santiago.

== Legacies ==
In the context of secular struggles caused by the non-separation of church and state, his style of street preaching caused him persecution and ridicule, but also a group of followers who decided to call themselves "Canutos," or "Followers of Canut." In the early twentieth century, a writer and anarchist, Jose Santos Gonzalez Verades, described police officers arresting a group of evangelicals preaching and singing their way into prison, proclaiming themselves to be Canutos. Although this term has been extended to all members of evangelical churches, whether of not they are followers of Canut of Bon, on occasion, the term is used to refer to any very religious person who effusively professes his or her religion in public. Some sectors of the evangelical cult reject this nickname and consider it burlesque, but it is accepted by the vast majority of evangelicals.

== See also ==
- Religion in Chile
