= Policy (1801 ship) =

History

United Kingdom
- Name: Policy
- Owner: 1801:Hurry & Co.; 1806:Mellish
- Builder: Dartmouth
- Launched: 1801
- Fate: Wrecked 1824

General characteristics
- Tons burthen: 275, or 285, or 293 (bm)
- Complement: 1803:24; 1806:26
- Armament: 1803:10 × 6-pounder guns + 4 swivel guns; 1806:10 × 6-pounder guns + 4 swivel guns; 1811:10 × 6-pounder guns

Policy was launched at Dartmouth in 1801. She was a whaler that made seven whaling voyages between 1803 and 1823. On her second whaling voyage, in 1804, she was able to capture two Dutch vessels. On her fourth voyage the United States Navy captured her, but the British Royal Navy recaptured her. She was lost at Tahiti in 1824 on her eighth whaling voyage.

== Career ==
Policy first appeared in Lloyd's Register in 1802 with G. Clark, master, Hurry & Co., owners, and trade London–South Seas. She had received copper sheathing in 1802.

1st whaling voyage (1802–1803): Captain Charles Clark sailed from London on 22 April 1802, during the period of the Peace of Amiens. Policy was bound for New Holland (Australia). She stopped in at Rio de Janeiro in June. She needed water and refreshment, and her crew was sickly. Policy returned to London on 6 September 1803.

2nd whaling voyage (1803–1805): By the time Policy left on her second whaling voyage war with France had resumed. Captain Charles Forster acquired a letter of marque on 26 November 1803. Captain Richard Charles Foster sailed from London on 20 December, bound for Timor.

On 6 June 1804 Policy captured the Dutch brig Trial between Sandal Wood and Floris Islands. Trial had been sailing from Copang to Batavia. Foster and 11 of his men were ill, so he freed Trial after having taken her sandalwood and bee's wax. He sold the sandalwood at Delhi and rendered the wax into casks for the English market.

Policy arrived at Sydney on 17 November 1804 from Timor. She brought with her the Dutch vessel Swift, Richard Portvelt, master, which she had captured on 12 September in a single-ship action at 8°0′S 121°10′E after an exchange of fire that had not resulted in casualties on either vessel. Swift had been sailing from Batavia to Amboyna. Foster landed Portvelt and 12 of his crew at Timor. He engaged the others to help him navigate both Policy and Swift, promising to pay their existing contractual wages.

The vice admiralty court in Sydney on 27 November declared Swift a lawful prize to Captain Foster. (Note: Swift's owners were the Batavian residents Wintz and Talman, who had purchased her for 18,000 dollars. The Dutch East India Company had chartered her for the voyage from Batavia to Amboyna.) The government also permitted Foster to sell 1900 gallons of arrack. Part of Swift's cargo was fifteen chests of Spanish dollars worth £20,000. Because Foster was concerned about carrying that much specie during wartime he offered it to Governor Philip Gidley King in exchange for bills drawn on HM Treasury; King was concerned about taking on such a responsibility and declined. Foster also offered Swift to the government, but King declined the opportunity to buy her.

Captain Foster also brought news from Timor of the loss, probably in mid-June, of Mersey in the Torres Strait. Mersey was the first merchantman lost in the Strait.

The Sydney Gazette reported that Policy's crew was in ill-health. She had left in company with Experiment, which was transporting convicts to New South Wales. However, the water on Policy had been carried in lead cisterns that had previously carried oil. The report also mentioned that she had gathered 300 barrels of sperm oil. Policy returned to London on 9 December 1805.

The Register of Shipping for 1806 showed Policy's master changing from C. Forster to J. Garwood, and her owner from I. Hurry to Mellish. Lloyd's Register continued to carry Hurry as her owner until 1811.

3rd whaling voyage (1806–1807): Captain John Jarwood acquired a letter of marque on 20 February 1806. He sailed from London on 27 February. Policy returned to London on 14 April 1807.

Merchantman (1807–1811): During this period Captain Jarwood (or Garwood), sailed Policy between England and Cadiz or Gibraltar. Throughout this period the registers still showed her trade as London–South Seas.

The Register of Shipping for 1811 showed Policy's master changing from Garwood to J. Bowman. It also amended her burthen from 293 tons to 275 tons.

4th whaling voyage (1812–1814): In 1812 Captain J. Bowman sailed for the Galápagos Islands.

On 29 April 1813 boats from USS Essex, Captain David Porter, captured the British whalers Policy, Montezuma, and Georgiana.

Porter sent Essex Junior to Valparaiso with the prizes Hector, Catharine, Policy, and Montezuma, and the American ship Barclay, with the instructions to leave Barclay there and to sell the prizes. At Valparaiso the Americans consolidated the cargoes from the prizes onto Policy and sent her to the United States.

On 4 December 1813 HMS Ramillies and Loire recaptured Policy, J.Bowman, master, and sent her into Halifax, Nova Scotia. Lloyd's List gave the date of capture as 11 December, the location as "off Sandy Hook", and the name of her master as Brown. She had 1200 barrels of oil on board.

Policy returned to England on 17 July 1814. Her master may have been Johnston.

In 1813, the British East India Company (EIC) had lost its monopoly on the trade between India and Britain. British ships were then free to sail to India or the Indian Ocean under a licence from the EIC. Policy's owners applied for a licence to sail to certain ports in the East Indies under the provisions for whalers. They applied on 3 October 1814, and received the licence on 5 October.

5th whaling voyage (1815–1817): By one account, Captain Mark Munro sailed for Peru in 1815. Alternatively, on 3 January 1815 Policy, M'Names, master, sailed from Plymouth for the South Seas. In November she was at the Fishery with 450 barrels of whale oil. On 15 March 1816 Policy was at the Galápagos. On 23 April, Policy, Munro, master, was still there, 50 tons short of completing her cargo. Policy returned to London on 2 September 1817.

6th whaling voyage (1817–1820): Captain Francis Stavers sailed from London on 4 November 1817, bound for the Galápagos Islands. In February 1820 Policy was at the Galápagos with 1200 barrels of oil. She left Valparaiso on 11 April and returned to London on 19 July with 200 tons of sperm oil.

A letter from Jamaica, dated 3 December 1819, reported that while Policy was off the coast of Chile the Chilean Squadron, under the command of Lord Cochrane, had fired on her. Boats from the Squadron boarded her and warned Stavers not to come within 18 leagues of the coast or risk being detained and taken into Valparaiso.

7th whaling voyage (1820–1823): Captain Branton (or Brunton, or Brandon), sailed from London on 3 October 1820. Policy immediately grounded on the Sands at Margate but boats got her off and there did not appear to be material damage. Still, on 5 October she returned to the Thames. Then on 22 October Policy, Branton, master, was at Deal when a gale hit the British coast. It drove her, but she was able to drop two anchors at her head and ride out the gale. By 2 November she was at Portsmouth on her way to the South Seas. By 20 April 1822 she was at Callao on her way to resume whaling with Meek, master. Policy returned on 26 June 1823.

== Loss ==
Captain William Brock sailed Policy from London on 26 August 1823, bound for the Pacific. On 6 February 1824 Policy, Brach, master, was at Talcahuano.

Policy was lost at Otaheite on 1 May 1824. All hands were saved and part of the crew came to Sydney in the cutter Snapper. Captain Brock and the Chief Officer, John Cressy, were landed at Bay of Islands. There they took passage to New Bedford in Golconda. (Note: Golconda, of New Bedford, Massachusetts, and 331 tons (bm), had been built in 1807 at Scituate, Massachusetts. She made 15 whaling voyages before the Confederate commerce raider Florida captured her on 8 July 1864, and burnt her.)
