= Dissidents Cemetery =

Cementerio de Disidentes
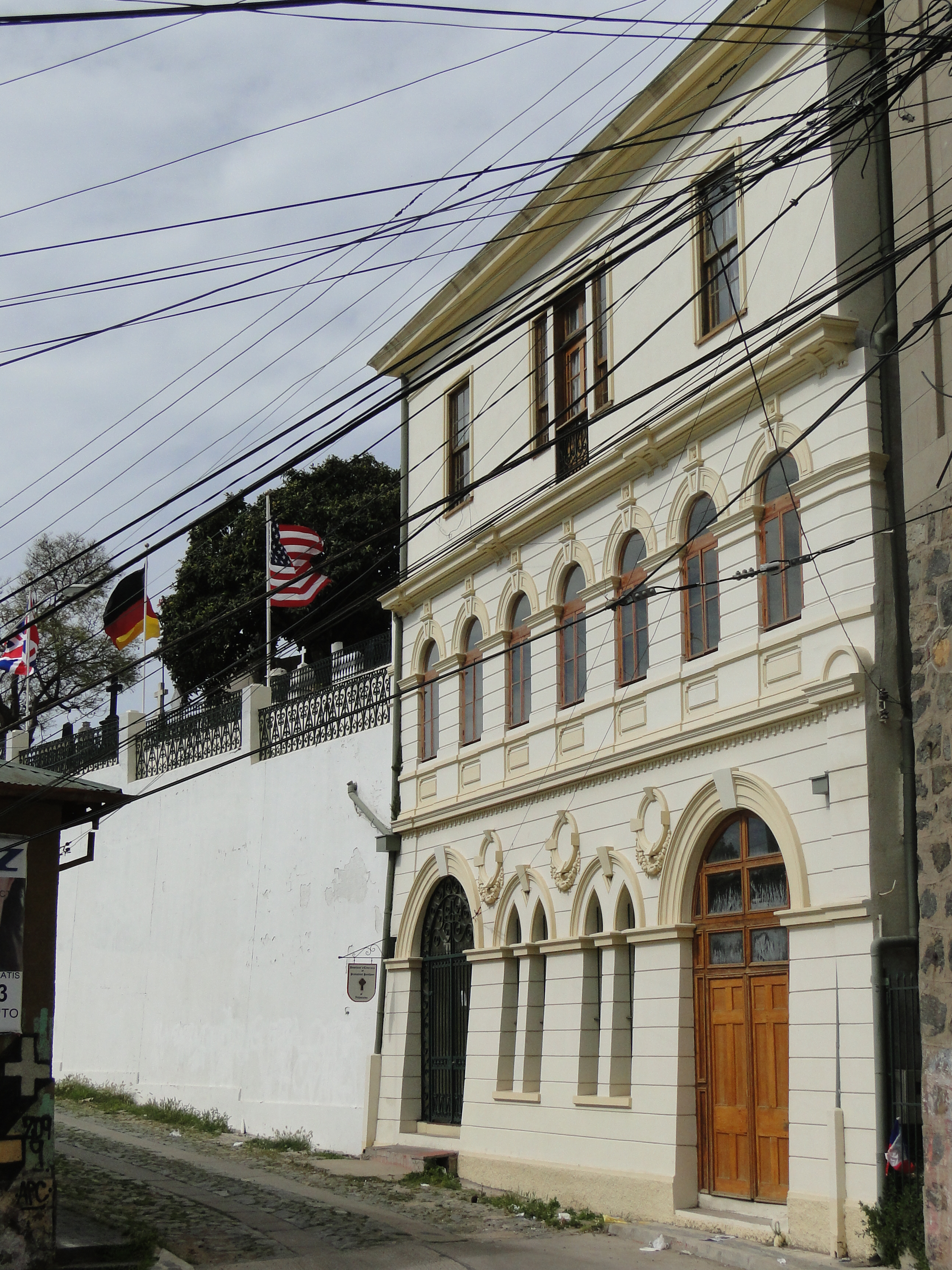
- Main entrance of the cemetery
- Interactive map of Cementerio de Disidentes

Details
- Established: 1825
- Location: Valparaíso
- Country: Chile
- Coordinates: 33.045°S 71.625°W

The Cemetery of Dissidents is on the Panteón hill, in front of the Cemetery nº 1 and at one side of the old city jail (now a cultural center) in Valparaíso, Chile.

It was created in 1825 to hold the remains of the British and other Europeans residents, whose Protestant faith differed from the official state religion at the time, Roman Catholicism.

In the early 19th century, immigrants to Valparaíso who were not Catholic were forbidden from being buried in Catholic cemeteries; they were buried on Playa Ancha hill, or simply thrown into the sea. In 1823 British consul George Seymour, with the aid of mayor Robert Simpson, bought some land at one side of the city jail, to build a special cemetery for "dissidents" (i.e. those who did not adhere to the Catholic faith.)

The cemetery is divided into eight sections and has nearly 800 graves. Most of the burials belong to immigrants of British, German and American origin.

Inside Cemetery No. 1, there is a monument dedicated to the American sailors who died during the 1814 Battle of Valparaiso, when the USS Essex was captured by the English ships Cherub and Phoebe.

There is also a monument dedicated to Reverend David Trumbull, founder of the Presbyterian Church of the city.

In 1883, religious discrimination in municipal cemeteries was abolished. Until that year, the Cemetery of Dissidents also housed non-Catholics who had died in other cities such as Santiago and La Serena.

The cemetery suffered damage in the 1906 and 2010 earthquakes. Renovations in 2011 included a new memorial "Plaza of the immigrant".

== See also ==
- Dissidents Courtyard
