= Mersey (1801 ship) =

Ship wrecked in the Torres Strait, Australia

History

United Kingdom
- Name: Mersey
- Namesake: River Mersey
- Builder: Chittagong
- Launched: 1801
- Fate: Wrecked 1804

General characteristics
- Type: Ship
- Tons burthen: 300, or 350 (bm)
- Propulsion: Sail
- Complement: 73
- Armament: 10 guns
- Notes: Teak built.

Mersey was a ship launched at Chittagong in 1801, and wrecked in the Torres Strait, Australia, about mid-June 1804. She was the first merchantman lost in the Strait.

Mersey was built in Chittagong in 1801, and registered at Fort William, India. At the time of her loss her captain and owner was James Wilson.

Mersey, Captain Wilson, arrived at Sydney on 10 April 1804, with a cargo chiefly consisting of sugar, port and Madeira wine, cordage, and some piece goods. An advertisement on 22 April, announced the sale on Monday 23 April, of Mersey's cargo. The advertisement provided a rich, detailed listing of the cargo.

Philip Gidley King, governor of New South Wales, on 15 May 1804, announced that Mersey would return to India via an "hithertoo unfrequented passage to Torres Strait in the track of Captain Flinders." King had chartered Mersey to purchase 250 cows from Bengal and deliver them to Hobart, Tasmania.

Mersey left Port Jackson on 24 May 1804, for Bengal with a cargo of 1632 feet of timber. While passing through the Torres Strait, Mersey was totally wrecked. The whaler Policy brought the news on 17 November 1804, from Timor.

Only 17 crew and the captain were saved by sailing in a longboat to Timor; 56 others had perished. After refitting the longboat at Dili the survivors reached Bencoolen from where they sailed to Madras on an Acehen vessel. Captain Wilson arrived in Calcutta 20 September 1804, on board Margaret, from Madras.

== See also ==
- Mersey (1894 ship)
