= Georgiana (1791 ship) =

History

Great Britain
- Name: Georgiana
- Owner: St Barbe & Co.
- Builder: W.Richards, Hythe, Southampton
- Launched: 15 August 1791
- Fate: Sold c. 1794

British East India Company
- Name: Georgiana
- Operator: East India Company
- Builder: Wells (measured and surveyed)
- Acquired: c.1794
- Fate: Sold c.1812

United Kingdom
- Name: Georgiana
- Owner: Samuel Enderby & Sons
- Acquired: c.1812 by purchase
- Captured: April 1813

United States
- Name: USS Georgiana
- Acquired: April 1813 by capture
- Captured: November 1813

United Kingdom
- Name: Georgiana
- Owner: Boyes
- Acquired: 1814 as a prize
- Fate: Condemned 1818

General characteristics
- Tons burthen: 276, or 27639/94 or 280, or 285, or 302 (bm)
- Length: 94 ft 8 in (28.9 m) (overall; 74 ft 5 in (22.7 m) (keel)
- Beam: 26 ft 10 in (8.2 m)
- Depth of hold: 11 ft 11 in (3.6 m)
- Propulsion: Sail
- Complement: 1793:35; 1798:30; 1803:35
- Armament: 1793:10 × 6-pounder guns + 4 × 18-pounder carronades; 1798:12 × 6-pounder guns; 1803:16 × 18&12-pounder cannons; 1813:16 × 6-pounder guns; 1815:2 × 9-pounder guns + 2 × 18-pounder carronades
- Notes: Three decks

Georgiana was launched in 1791. She served as a merchantman, packet ship for the British East India Company (EIC), a whaler, a warship of the navy of the United States of America, and a merchant vessel again. She was sold after being condemned in 1818 as leaky.

== Merchantman ==
Georgiana first appears in Lloyd's Register (LR), in 1791 with W. Waring, master, St Barbe & Co, owner, and trade London—Turkey.

Captain William Waring received a letter of marque for Georgiana on 29 August 1793. Lloyd's Register for 1793 showed her sailing between London and Turkey.

| Year | Master | Owner | Trade | Source |
|---|---|---|---|---|
| 1793 | Waring | St Barbe | London–Turkey | LR |

In 1794 William Waring became master of Amazon, but LR carried the 1793 information unchanged for a number of years.

== EIC Packet ==
Reportedly, initially the EIC simply chartered Georgiana, but later it purchased her outright. She served as a packet ship between England and India, and also as a tender to the EIC's station at St Helena. The EIC on 19 April 1794 appointed Captain John Luard captain of Georgiana.

=== Missing voyage ===
EIC records imply that Georgiana made seven voyages for the company. However, records only account for the six listed below. One source has Georgiana sailing on 25 January 1795 and returning on 25 March 1797. That conflates the missing first voyage with the subsequent voyage. Lloyd's List's ship arrival and departure data for 1795 has no mention of Georgiana, or Luard. Other EIC records show Luard sailing Harriot to Bengal between May 1794 and July 1795.

=== EIC voyage #1 (1796–1797) ===
Captain John Luard sailed from Portsmouth on 23 January 1796, bound for St Helena and Bengal. She reached St Helena on 2 May. By 27 May Georgiana was at Simon's Bay, and she arrived at Diamond Harbour on 31 July. Homeward bound, she was at St Helena on 5 January 1797, Falmouth on 29 March, and finally Greenhithe on 30 May.

=== EIC Voyage #2 (1798–1800) ===
On 27 June 1798 Captain Henry Leigh acquired a letter of marque. On 21 August he sailed Georgiana from Falmouth for St Helena and the Cape of Good Hope. She arrived at St Helena on 26 October and then reached the Cape on 3 December. She was back at St Helena on 14 January 1799 and the Cape on 25 February. She was at False Bay on 18 May, the Cape on 14 June, and St Helena on 5 July.

Georgiana shared with the garrison of St Helena and the East Indiaman Glatton in the proceeds from the capture of the Danish East Indiaman Copenhagen in July 1799.

Between 21 September and 5 October Georgiana was cruising. She returned to St Helena on 6 October. She was at Trindade on 27 October, and the Cape on 24 November, before returning to St Helena on 28 December. She then sailed for home, reaching Shannon on 9 April 1800 and Crookhaven on 13 May, before arriving at Deptford on 23 May.

=== EIC voyage #3 (1800–1802) ===
Captain Leigh sailed from Plymouth on 15 September 1800, bound for Bengal. Georgiana reached the Cape on 2 December and arrived at Calcutta on 22 February 1801. Homeward bound, she was at Kedgeree on 22 August, reached St Helena on 2 January 1802, and arrived at Deptford on 27 March.

The EIC announced the sale on 30 April 1802 of 1,300 bags of rice that had come from Bengal on Georgiana in private trade. The sale of Georgiana's rice was to follow the sale that day of 27,000 bags of rice for the EIC's account that the East Indiamen Ganges, Cornwallis, Medway, and Union had brought.

=== EIC voyage #4 (1803–1807) ===
War with France resumed in May 1803. Captain Leigh received a letter of marque on 3 August 1803. He sailed from Portsmouth on 28 August, bound for St Helena and the Cape. Georgiana would then spend some three years at St Helena, serving primarily as a look-out vessel and guard ship.

Georgiana reached St Helena on 23 November and sailed from there on 5 February 1804, returning five days later. On 10 November she sailed from St Helena, returning four days later. On 7 February 1805 she sailed from St Helena, before returning 20 days later. On 12 June she was at Benguella, before returning to St Helena on 29 June. She was again at Benguela on 4 October before returning to St Helena on 1 November. She was again at St Helena on 8 April 1806. False Bay on 11 May, the Cape on 26 May, Simons Bay on 2 June, and St Helena on 24 August. On 17 October Georgiana was at the River Plate. On 24 November she was at the Cape, and on 14 January 1807 she returned to St Helena. From there she sailed home, arriving at Blackwall on 15 April.

=== EIC voyage #5 (1807–1809) ===
1807/8 Madras and Bengal. Captain Leigh sailed from Portsmouth on 17 November 1807, bound for Madras and Bengal. She reached Calcutta on 13 April 1808. She was at Kedgeree on 19 December, and Madras on 29 December. By 22 February 1809 Georgiana was at St Helena; she arrived at Blackwall on 6 May.

=== EIC voyage #6 (1809–1811) ===
Captain Leigh sailed from Portsmouth on 4 October 1809, bound for Madras and Bengal. Georgiana reached Madras on 16 February 1810, and Calcutta on 16 May. She was at Saugor on 11 September and Madras on 9 October, before returning to Calcutta on 6 November. Homeward bound, she was at Kedgeree on 19 February 1811, the Cape on 2 June, and St Helena on 4 July. On 5 September she arrived at Deptford.

== Whaler ==
After her return to England, her owners sold Georgiana to Enderby & Co., London. Enderbys appointed Captain W. Pitt as master, and dispatched Georgiana to the South Seas fishery.

== USS Georgiana ==
In early 1813 Captain David Porter entered the Pacific, via Cape Horn, in the thirty-two gun frigate USS Essex.

On 29 April 1813 boats from Essex captured Georgiana off the Galapagos Islands (Note: The entry for Georgiana in the Register of Shipping for 1814 shows W. Pitt as master, her trade as the South Seas fishery, but the EIC as owner. The entry bears the notation: "Captured". The entry in Lloyd's Register for 1813 shows Enderby as owner, and gives Georgiana only two guns.) That same day Essex captured two more British whalers, Montezuma and Policy.

Porter referred to Georgiana as a "letter of marque ship, armed with six 18-pdrs., 4 swivels, and 6 long blunderbusses". He took her crew off and put some 40 to 60 men and some guns aboard her. On 8 May he commissioned her as the USS Georgiana, under the command of Lieutenant John Downes.

Departing 12 May, Georgiana cruised off the Galapagos in search of British whaling ships. While sailing near James Island 28 May, she met Catharine and Rose and captured them with no resistance. She then chased a third whaler, Hector and engaged in a brief, but sharp, combat that brought down Hector's main-topmast and most of her standing and running rigging. After capturing Hector, Georgiana placed the crews of all three whalers in Rose, under parole, and sent her as a cartel to St Helena. Georgiana, Catherine, and Hector then on 24 June joined Essex at Tumbez, Peru. Also on 28 May, Essex captured the whaler Greenwich; Porter armed her too as and put Lieutenant Gamble of the US Marines on her as captain.

Georgiana departed Tumbez on 30 June and sailed for the Galapagos with Essex and the prizes. On 13 July she aided Greenwich during a spirited encounter with Seringapatam.

The other two whalers the Americans captured that day were Charlton and New Zealander. Porter fitted out Seringapatam to replace Georgiana. Despite her captures, Georgiana had proven to be a "dull sailer". Porter loaded Georgiana with a full cargo of sperm oil from several of the captured whalers. He reduced her armament, manned her by a prize crew under Lieutenant James Wilson. She departed the Galapagos for the United States 25 July.

== British merchantman again ==
On 28 November 1813, HMS Barrosa recaptured Georgiana and sent her into Bermuda. Lloyd's Register for 1814 has the notation "captured" crossed out. It also shows Captain B. Boyes replacing Pitt.

On 13 March 1814 Georgiana returned to England. She was carrying almost 3000 barrels of oil as she had the combined cargoes of several of the whalers the Americans had captured, as well as her own.

Her recapture gave rise to a court case over whether Georgiana and her cargo were a prize, or salvage. The High Court of Admiralty ruled for salvage for the cargo, but a prize for the vessel.

The Register of Shipping for 1815 shows Georgiana with R. Boyes, master and owner, and trade London-Bremen. Lloyd's Register (1815) shows B. Boyes as master and J. Boyes as owner.

== Fate ==
Georgiana put into Funchal, Madeira, on 24 February 1818 as she was sailing from Antwerp for the River Plate. She was leaking badly. She was surveyed at Funchal, condemned, and sold there for breaking up.
