= John Downes (naval officer) =

US Naval officer

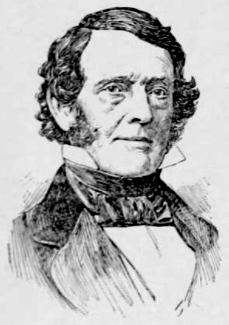
- Born: December 23, 1784; Canton, Massachusetts, US
- Died: August 11, 1854 (aged 69); Charlestown, Massachusetts, US
- Military career
- Branch: United States Navy
- Service years: 1800–1852
- Rank: Commodore
- Commands: Georgiana; Essex Junior; USS Epervier; USS Macedonian; Pacific Squadron; USS Java; USS Potomac
- Conflicts: First Barbary War; Action of 2 June 1803; Second Battle of Tripoli Harbor; War of 1812; USS Essex vs HMS Alert; Action off James Island; Action off Charles Island; Nuku Hiva Campaign; Battle of Valparaiso; Second Barbary War; Battle off Cape Gata; Battle off Cape Palos; First Sumatran Expedition; Battle of Quallah Battoo; Peruvian War of Independence; Callao Affair

Commodore John Downes (December 23, 1784 – August 11, 1854) was an officer in the United States Navy, whose service covered the first half of the 19th century.

== Life ==
=== Early life ===
John Downes was born in Canton, Massachusetts on December 23, 1784.

=== Barbary Wars ===
He served as acting midshipman from September 9, 1800, and was appointed midshipman June 1, 1802. He rendered distinguished service during the First Barbary War in 1804 in the frigate Congress, and distinguished himself again while a midshipman on the frigate New York in a boat attack upon Tripolitan feluccas.

=== War of 1812 ===
In March 1807, he was made a lieutenant and served as executive officer for Captain David Porter on the Essex during her cruise in the Pacific in the War of 1812. In the action off James Island, Downes was in command of the sloop Georgiana during the capture of three British whalers. He also participated in the action off Charles Island before sailing to Nuku Hiva to assist in building America's first military base in the Pacific. Among the Essex's many prizes was the whale ship Atlantic, "which Captain Porter fitted as a cruiser and classified as a sloop-of-war, with twenty guns, named the Essex Junior, and placed under the command of Lieutenant Downes who retained this place until the capture of the Essex, and the conversion of Essex Junior into a cartel, 28 March 1814."

Downes was promoted to master commandant in 1813, and two years later commanded the brig Epervier, in the squadron employed against Algiers under Stephen Decatur. On June 17, 1815 he, in concert with the rest of Decatur's squadron, captured the Algerian frigate Mashouda. Two days later the Epervier and three of the smaller vessels of the squadron captured the Algerine brig of war Estedio with twenty-two guns and 180 men off Cape Paios. After the conclusion of peace with Algiers, Decatur transferred Downes to his own ship, Guerriere.

Downes also served on the Ontario and Independence. He became captain in March 1817.

=== Tour of South America ===
Downes took command of USS Macedonian in 1818 and set forth on a three-year show of power for America to South America and beyond. On this trip, he decided to use the ship for his own enrichment and became a banking ship, giving protection, passage, and banking service to privateers, pirates, and others. He took large amounts for his own private use. He took at least 2.6 million in specie during his trip. He so angered his associates, whom he kept busy counting money under poor conditions, that one of his midshipmen, William Rodgers, resigned from the Navy after coming ashore from this three-year voyage. He cited not being able to "do what I joined this man's Navy to do. Not being able to serve my country but to simply be serving for the monetary good of Captain Downes". Captain Downes had so much specie aboard that he was able to bribe Lord Cochrane into allowing the Macedonian to pass Cochrane's blockade.

=== Mediterranean Squadron ===
Downes became commodore of the Mediterranean Squadron, and from 1828 to 1829 he commanded the Java in the Mediterranean.

=== Sumatran Expedition ===
His next assignment (1832–1834) was to command the Pacific Squadron. In 1832, Downes was ordered to the coast of Sumatra to avenge an attack on the American merchantman Friendship, of Salem, Massachusetts.

In February 1831, the American merchant ship arrived at the harbor of Quallah Battoo on the Pedir coast of Sumatra to take on a cargo of pepper. A Malay boat arrived, but as the pepper was loaded the Malays, on signal, attacked the officers and crew. According to Owen Rutter's Pirate Wind, every American on board was killed before the pirates ransacked the ship and took its cargo. The captain however, had been on shore with four of his crew. He returned to the ship, fled and received help from other American ships also trading on the coast. They returned to Salem, the headquarters of much of America's trade with the East at that time, and also reported that the local chieftain denied any knowledge of the attack in his harbor. President Andrew Jackson, along with many Americans, was outraged and vowed retribution. If there was a regular government that Downes could deal with, he was authorized to negotiate with it, if not, he was to "inflict chastisement" on any "band of lawless pirates" responsible for the atrocity. Downes, in command of the Potomac left New York harbor August 28, 1831 bound for Quallah Battoo by way of the Cape of Good Hope and the Indian Ocean.

The ship arrived at Quallah Battoo on February 5, 1832. Although Downes was told to attempt to negotiate first, he relied on the advice of a native who seemed to be friendly and who advised that the local chieftain was unlikely to negotiate "except with a very sharp knife on his gullet." Early on February 7, Downes sent a detachment of marines and three detachments of seamen (a total of 282 men) with orders to take four Malay forts along the coast. They divided into three parties, attacked the forts in a combination of hand-to-hand combat and bombardment from the ship's 30-pound cannons. In five hours, the forts were taken, reportedly with all 150 of the defenders, including the local chieftain, fighting to the death. On February 9, the ship bombarded the village itself, which caught on fire. The action resulted in another 300 dead.

=== Circumnavigation ===
The Potomac then proceeded around the world, becoming the second U.S. naval vessel (after the Vincennes under Commander William B. Finch) to circumnavigate the globe. The ship was also the first to host sitting royalty – the king and queen of the Hawaiian Islands.

When Downes arrived at Valparaíso, Chile, Jeremiah N. Reynolds, an American explorer and author, joined the expedition as the commodore's private secretary for the trip and wrote a book about the experience, Voyage of the United States Frigate Potomac. Downes' sea service terminated with this cruise.

=== Later life ===
On returning home, Downes was severely criticized for his harsh actions, but Jackson supported him, saying the fighting would deter future aggression. Yet the action wasn't absolutely successful – in August 1838 another American merchant ship, the Eclipse, was attacked by 24 Malays who had been allowed on board. The United States responded with the Second Sumatran Expedition, which had a more lasting effect.

From 1837 to 1842, and from 1850 to 1852, he commanded the Charlestown Navy Yard in Boston Harbor. He died there on August 11, 1854.

== Legacy ==
Three ships in the United States Navy have been named USS Downes in honor of him.

Genovesa Island in Ecuador's Galapagos Archipelago is also known as "Tower Island", believed to be result of a string of corruptions of Downes's surname. Downes recorded the island's position in 1813 and the name Dowers's Island appeared in 1815, presumably in misspelled reference to Downes, and—after passing through Dowers's, Dowers, and Tower's—it was finally written as Tower on a British Admiralty chart in 1841. (Note: The 1815 Fyffe chart... displays the first appearance of the name Dowers's for the island now known as Genovesa/Tower. This chart also identifies the present Isla Santa Cruz as Porters Isle, so it is clear that Fyffe knew of David Porter's earlier visit on the United States Frigate Essex. He therefore may have also known that Lieutenant John Downes of the Essex reported the position of this island to Captain Porter, and if so he may have assigned the Lieutenant's name (but mis-spelled as “Dowers”) to the island. The Hooker chart in the second edition of David Porter's Journal of a Cruise shows the same island but with no name assigned to it. A note on the chart states that the island is “... situated agreeably to the reports of several Whalemen, and corresponds to the position in which it was seen by Lieut. Downes.”)
