= Panteón Hill =

Hill of the city of Valparaíso, Chile

Coordinates: 33°2′42.94″S 71°37′30.14″W

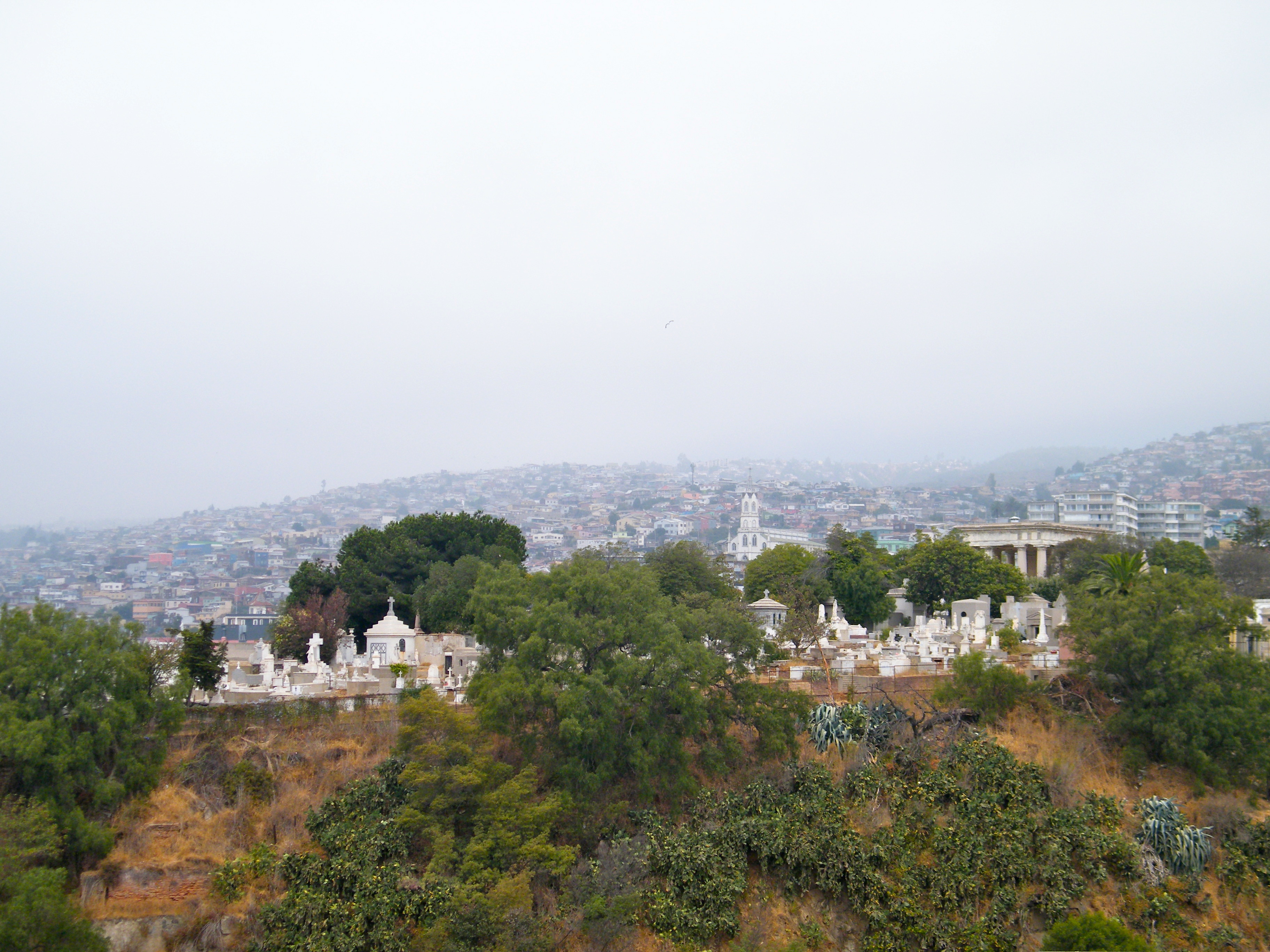
View of Cemetery No. 1, on Panteón hill.

Panteón (Pantheon) Hill in one of the 42 hills of the city of Valparaíso, Chile. It is surrounded by Ecuador and Cumming Streets and it has its base on Condell Street. It is next to Cárcel (Jail) Hill and Panteón Hill is part of the central chain of Valparaíso's hills.

Panteón is Spanish for cemetery. It is named Cemetery Hill because three cemeteries of the city can be found on the hill: the Cemetery No. 1, the Dissidents Cemetery and the Cemetery No. 2.

At the beginning of the 19th century, the people of Valparaíso used to bury their dead by letting them wash away in the ocean or on the tops of hills. These unsanitary practices eventually caused a health crisis. In 1825, the government bought some lands to found a cemetery on the hill on the periphery of the city. The Catholics originally created the cemetery nº1, and with the help of British immigrants a second one was created to bury at those not of the Catholic faith, called Dissidents Cemetery. Cemetery nº2 was created in 1848.
