= Pascual Baburizza =

Croatian-Chilean businessman

Pascual Baburizza (born Pasko Baburica Šoletić) (Calamotta, Austro-Hungarian Empire, now Koločep, Croatia, 1875– Los Andes, Chile, 1941) was a Croatian businessman prominent in Chile during the late 19th and early 20th centuries.

He moved to Chile in 1892 with his brother Vittorio (Vicko), establishing themselves in the city of Iquique, where they were dedicated to saltpeter mining operations. Later, he began to expand their properties, establishing control of the supply chain of buying and selling of nitrate in the region until the 1928 saltpeter crisis. Then, he invested in agricultural societies, the most prominent being the San Vicente Agricultural Company in Los Andes, and Agricultural Society Rupanco Ñuble.

== After death ==
His art collection was left to the city of Valparaíso, and his former residence Palacio Baburizza now serves as a museum. Most of his land and capital were left to the National Botanic Garden of Chile.
