= Catharine (1809 ship) =

History

United Kingdom
- Name: Catharine
- Launched: Unknown
- Acquired: c.1809, possibly by purchase of a prize
- Fate: Burnt 1814

General characteristics
- Tons burthen: 274, or 278 or (bm)
- Complement: 29 (at capture)
- Armament: 1809:6 × 6-pounder guns + 6 × 12-pounder carronades; 1812:4 × 6-pounder guns + 6 × 12-pounder carronades

Catharine first appeared in the registers in 1809 as American-built and having undergone repairs in that year. In 1811 she became a whaler and sailed to the Pacific where the United States Navy captured her. Her captors sailed her to Valparaiso to sell her but when they were unable to do so they took her out to sea and burned her in February 1814.

== Career ==
Year	Master	Owner	Trade	Source & notes
1809	B. Fann	Capt. & Co. Hogg & Co.	London–Gibraltar; London–Malta	Register of Shipping (RS); good repair 1809
1811	P. Fann; Folger	Hogg & Co. Herbert & Co.	London–Malta; London–South seas	RS; small repairs 1811
1812	O. Foulgar	Milner & Co.	London–South Seas	Lloyd's Register (LR); New York-built & American prize; damage and thorough repair 1809
1812	Folger	Herbert & Co.	London–South Seas	RS; good repair 1809 and small repairs 1811

Captain Thomas Folger was a native of Nantucket. Before being captain on Catharine, Folger had been master of several whalers: Vulture (1804–1807), Griffin (1807–1809), and Charlton (1808–1810). After being captain of Catharine, Folger became master of Rambler (1816–1819).

== Capture and loss ==
While nearing James Island in the afternoon on May 28, lookouts aboard USS Georgiana sighted a mast and sails on the horizon. In fact the sails belonged to two brigs, Catharine, and Rose. When the Americans were within range they lowered a few boats filled with men and captured the two sloops without resistance. Then the Americans spotted and captured a third vessel Hector. The Americans disarmed Rose and put the bulk of their prisoners aboard her, sending her to Saint Helena as a cartel

Lloyd's List reported that the American sent Hector and Catharine to Tombus. It further reported that although Rose had been sent for England, she proved leaky and had to put into Lima.

Actually, Georgiana took Catharine and Hector to rendezvous with Captain Porter and the USS Essex there. Porter sent Essex Junior to Valparaiso with the prizes Hector, Catharine, Policy, and Montezuma, and the American ship Barclay, with the instructions to leave Barclay there and to sell the prizes. The Americans were unable to sell Hector, Catharine, or Montezuma.

In early 1814 Porter arrived at Valparaiso. He towed Hector and Catharine out to sea and burned them, probably on 14 February. The Spanish seized Montezuma and sold her. At the time of her capture Catharine had held 450 casks of oil. The Americans put the oil from Hector, Catharine, and Montezuma aboard Policy and sent her to the United States. However, the Royal Navy recaptured Policy before she could reach an American port.
