= Rose (1806 ship) =

History

United Kingdom
- Name: Rose
- Builder: Liverpool
- Launched: 1806
- Fate: Last listed in 1823

General characteristics
- Tons burthen: 220, or 245 (bm)
- Complement: 1807:25; 1811: 24; 1813: 21
- Armament: 1807:16 × 9&12-pounder cannons; 1808:4 × 9-pounder guns + 12 × 18-pounder carronades; 1810:4 × 9-pounder guns + 10 × 12-pounder carronades; 1811:8 × 12&9-pounder cannons

Rose was launched at Liverpool in 1806. She made one voyage as a slave ship in the triangular trade in enslaved people. Following the abolition of the slave trade new owners sailed her to South America, to New South Wales, and then to the South Seas as a whaler. While Rose was off Peru the U.S. Navy captured her, but released her as a cartel. She returned to England and began trading with Savannah. She was last listed in 1823.

== Career ==
Rose first appeared in Lloyd's Register (LR) in 1806 with T.Cubbin, master, Aspinall & Co. owners, and trade Liverpool–Africa.

Enslaving voyage: Captain Thomas Cubbin sailed from Liverpool on 28 June 1806. Rose acquired captives at Bonny and arrived at Kingston, Jamaica on 24 January 1807. There she delivered 346 captives. She left Kingston on 18 March and arrived back at Liverpool on 16 May. She had left with 38 crew members and she suffered four crew deaths on the voyage.

The Slave Trade Act 1807, which forbade British vessels to engage in the slave trade, took effect on 1 May 1807. Rose therefore could not continue in that trade. The Aspinalls sold her to Brook & Co., which employed her in sailing from London to Montevideo, which the British had captured in February. Captain Charles Penson acquired a letter of marque on 1 September 1807.

Year	Master	Owner	Trade	Source & notes
1807	T.Cubbin; C.Pinson	Aspinall	Liverpool–Africa; London–Montevideo	LR
1808	C.Pinson	Brook & Co.	London–Montevideo	LR

The British invasions of the River Plate were short-lived and new owners started sailing Rose on other routes. In 1808 she sailed to Botany Bay. Rose, Brooks, master, arrived at Port Jackson on 15 April 1808 with merchandise from England. She sailed back for England on 15 September. Rose, Pinson, master, arrived at Saint Helena from Botany Bay, and then Plymouth on 15 May 1809. Thereafter, she sailed between London and Cadiz after the onset of the Peninsular War in 1807.

Year	Master	Owner	Trade	Source & notes
1810	J.Dent	Cosby & Co.	London–Cadiz	LR
1812	Munro	Corsbie & Co.	London–Cadiz	LR

Whaling voyage and capture: Captain Mark Munro acquired a letter of marque on 15 August 1811. On 7 September Rose, Munro, master, sailed from Plymouth for the South Seas.

USS Essex captured Rose on 29 April 1813 off Peru. The actual captor was Georgiana, under the command of Lieutenant Downes of the US Marine Corps. He also captured Hector, and Catharine.

Captain David Porter put the British crews of the vessels he had captured on Rose, made a cartel of her, and sent her for England. Before he did so, he had the prisoners swear not to take up arms against the United States until they had been formally exchanged, and he further threw her guns overboard, as well as her cargo of sperm oil.

Rose had to put into Lima leaky. Rose, Munro, master, arrived in England on 3 March 1814.

Year	Master	Owner	Trade	Source & notes
1814	Munro; Brooke	Corsbie	London–Cadiz; Plymouth–Jamaica	LR
1819	W.Ansell	Ansell & Co.	London–Savannah	LR
1823	Ansell	Ansell	London–Savannah	Register of Shipping
