= Montezuma (1804 ship) =

Warship, originally American

History

United States
- Name: Montezuma
- Owner: Snowden & North
- Builder: Philadelphia
- Launched: 1804
- Fate: Seized and condemned c.1807

United Kingdom
- Name: Montezuma
- Owner: 1807:A. Snowden; 1811:Snowden & Ben Rotch
- Acquired: c.1807 by purchase of a seizure
- Captured: April 1813

Spain
- Name: Moctezuma
- Fate: Captured by the Chilean Navy on 24 March 1819

Chile
- Name: Moctezuma
- Commissioned: 24 March 1819
- Fate: Given as gift to José de San Martín in 1822

Perú
- Name: Moctezuma
- Fate: Captured by mistake by Thomas Cochrane in 1822

Chile
- Name: Moctezuma
- Commissioned: 1822
- Fate: Sold as merchant ship in 1828

General characteristics
- Tons burthen: 270, or 293, or 300 (bm)
- Complement: 1813:20 (at capture)
- Armament: 1813:2 guns (at capture)

Montezuma was launched in Philadelphia in 1804. She came into British hands c.1807 after having been seized for attempting to evade the British East India Company's monopoly on British trade with India. She then initially traded with Charleston until 1811 when she went whaling in the Galápagos Islands. There the Americans captured her in 1813. Her captors sailed her to Valparaíso where the Spanish colonial government seized her.

Montezuma became Moctezuma and served as a sloop of the First Chilean Navy Squadron. The Chilean Navy sold her in 1828 and she returned to mercantile service.

== American East Indiaman ==
John Ashmead sailed Montezuma from Philadelphia on 9 April 1804, bound for Bengal. She arrived at Calcutta on 8 August. She left Calcutta on 2 December and arrived back in Philadelphia on 8 April 1804.

On 21 May 1805 Montezuma, John Anley, master, sailed to Batavia. Her voyage netted a profit of $9475.75. She then made a voyage too the Cape of Good Hope on behalf of the British Government. At the start of her journey a gale blew her out of the Delaware and she had to put into New York for $2000 in repairs and refitting before she could resume her voyage. Captain Anley delivered bread and wheat.

== British career ==
The British seized Montezuma for violating the EIC's monopoly on trading between England and India, and she was condemned at London. She first appeared in Lloyd's Register in 1807. Her master was J. Smith, her owner was A. Snowden, and her trade was Belfast–Bristol. Lloyd's Register for 1808 showed her trade changing to London–Charleston.

Lloyd's List for 1811 showed Montezuma's master changing from J. Smith to D.Baxter, and her trade from London–Charleston to London–South Seas.

Captain David Baxter sailed Montezuma from England on 2 November 1811, bound for Peru. (Note: Both Baxter and Benjamin Rotch, who was a co-owner of Montezuma, were from Nantucket and had migrated to the whaling port that Charles Francis Greville had established at Milford Haven.)

USS Essex captured Montezuma on 29 April 1813. Montezuma had already gathered 1400 barrels of sperm oil when taken. That same day Essex captured the British whalers Georgiana and Policy.

== American prize ==
The next day Captain David Porter, of Essex put a prize crew of 10 men under the command of Midshipman William H. Odenheimer aboard Montezuma.

Porter sent seven of his prizes (Essex Junior (ex-Atlantic), Barclay, Catharine, Hector, Montezuma, and Policy) into Valparaíso. They arrived on 12 August. Two days later a storm drove Policy and Montezuma into each other with some damage to Montezuma. The Americans were unable to sell their prizes. Following Porter's instructions, Policy sailed for the United States. Essex Junior then sailed to rendezvous with Porter, leaving the remaining prizes at Valparaíso.

Montezuma remained moored at Valparaíso at least through spring 1814. The Chilean government refused British and American claims to her. Eventually it seized and sold her, retaining the proceeds. It is currently unclear who she was sold to and what flag she sailed under.

== Moctezuma ==
Moctezuma re-appeared during the first blockade of Callao by the Chilean Squadron 1819. On 24 March 1819, the warships under the command of Thomas Cochrane captured Moctezuma, as she, with a US-flag, tried to break the blockade and deliver weapons to the royalists.

Moctezuma participated in the Capture of Valdivia and in the Freedom Expedition of Perú as a dispatch boat. She was left in Callao, but when Cochrane arrived (1822) there he found Moctezuma under the flag of the new Peruvian Navy. He seized her again and put her officers ashore. He was unaware that during his absence Bernardo O'Higgins had given the sloop to San Martin as a personal present.

Later she was commissioned under Lieutenant John Pascoe Grenfell for Cochrane's use as a flag ship. On 18 January 1823 Cochrane's flag as Vice Admiral of Chile was lowered for the last time from Moctezuma's main mast. He then sailed to Brazil where he assumed command of the Brazilian Navy.

In late 1823–early 1824 the Chilean Navy mounted an ultimately unsuccessful expedition to Peru. The expedition consisted of the frigate Lautaro, the armed schooners Moctezuma and Mercedes, and the transports Ceres, Esther (of Liverpool, Davis, master), Santa Rosa, and Sesostris.

== Fate ==
She was sold into mercantile service in 1828. No record exists of her subsequent activities.
