= HMS Barrosa (1812) =

Frigate of the Royal Navy

History

United Kingdom
- Name: HMS Barrosa
- Ordered: 4 April 1811
- Builder: Deptford Dockyard
- Laid down: October 1811
- Launched: 21 October 1812
- Commissioned: 25 October 1812
- Fate: Sold 25 May 1841

General characteristics
- Type: Apollo-class frigate
- Tons burthen: 94730/94 (bm)
- Length: Overall:143 ft 0 in (43.6 m); Keel:121 ft 8 3/4 in (37.1 m)
- Beam: 38 ft 3 in (11.7 m)
- Depth of hold: 13 ft 3 1/2 in (4.1 m)
- Propulsion: Sail
- Complement: 264
- Armament: Upper deck:26 × 18-pounder guns; QD:2 × 9-pounder guns + 10 × 32-pounder carronades; Fc:2 × 9-pounder guns + 4 × 32-pounder carronades

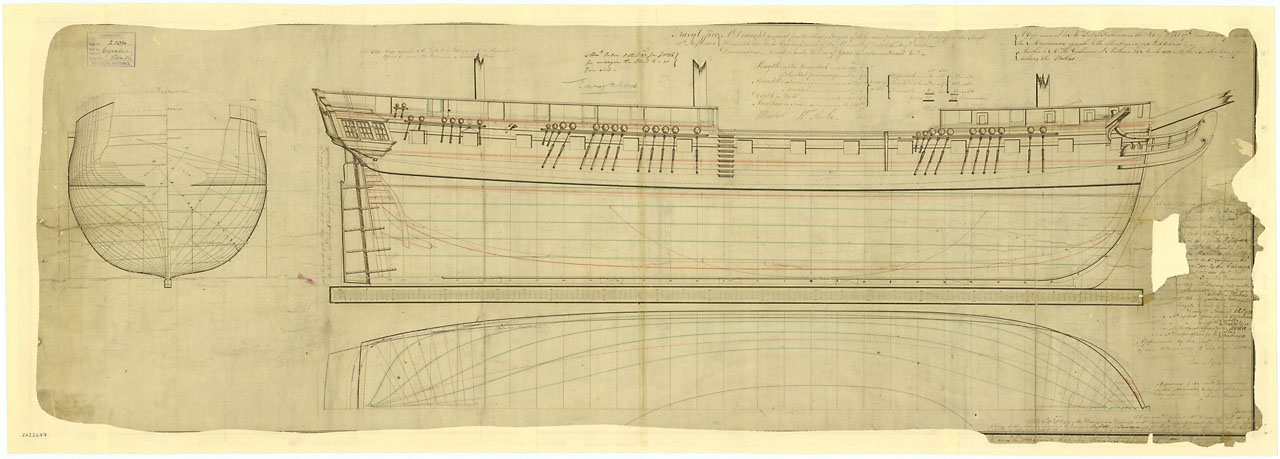
Plan of an Apollo-class frigate dated 1803

HMS Barrosa was a frigate launched in 1812 for the Royal Navy. During the War of 1812 she captured several prizes. After the war she spent a decade or so (1823–1833) on harbour duties. The navy sold Barrosa in 1841.

== Career ==
Captain William Henry Shirreff commissioned Barrosa on 25 October 1812. He sailed her for North America on 31 January 1813. She was serving as an escort to a convoy for the West Indies and the Brazils.

=== War of 1812 ===
On 22 May 1813, Barrosa captured the American schooner William and Thomas, of 25 tons (bm). Barrosa kept her prize as a ship's tender.

Barrosa was among the British naval vessels that shared in the capture of a number of merchant vessels in mid-January 1813:

- 11 June: Spanish brig St. Iago
- 12 June: American schooner Surveyor, Governor Strong, and Emily
- 14 June: Star
- 21 June: American ship Herman

Surveyor was a United States revenue schooner of six 12-pounder carronades, 100 tons (bm), and 25 men. Starr had been carrying 4388 barrels and 338 half-barrels of flour. Her captors sent Starr into Halifax, Nova Scotia.

On 20 June 1813 Barrosa and Laurestinus sailed to support Junon, then being attacked by US gun boats on the James River. The Americans withdrew with little damage to either side.

On 25 July 1813 the whale-ship Georgiana, a prize to the USS Essex, with a full cargo of spermaceti oil worth about 100,000 dollars, and armed with 16 guns and with a crew of 41 men, departed Valparaiso for the US. Barrosa captured Georgiana in the West Indies on 28 November, brought her into Bermuda prior to 7 December 1813. Georgiana was carrying close to 3000 barrels as she was carrying the combined cargoes of three captured English whalers as well as its own cargo. Georgiana was also carrying Captain William Stavers, who had been captain of Seringapatam at the time of her capture. Seringapatam had been preying on American ships but Stavers did not have a letter of marque authorizing him to engage in privateering. Consequently, the Americans were sending Stavers to the United States to stand trial for piracy.

Vice Admiral Cochrane tasked Barrosa to escort the convoy returning to Portsmouth. On 11 November Barrosa arrived at Halifax as escort to a convoy from Bermuda. She then sailed on to Portsmouth, where she arrived on 27 January 1814. She sailed from Portsmouth on 13 April, escorting a convoy to the West Indies.

Shirreff was invalided home in July 1814. In August 1814 Captain John Maxwell replaced Shirreff. Maxwell's replacement, in about a month, was Captain William McCulloch, of Venerable.

On 29 September McCullough reported the capture of the American letter of marque schooner Engineer, of eight guns and 35 men, and Friends, a schooner of 115 tons and 8 men bound from St. Augustine's to St. Bartholomew's. On 1 October Barrosa arrived at Barbados with a letter of marque schooner that was carrying 900 barrels of flour and that Barrosa had recently captured.

On 13 November Barrosa captured the schooner Clio, of six men and 96 tons (bm). The next day Barrosa captured the 1-gun schooner High Flyer, of 17 men and 135 tons (bm).

On 26 December 1814 Barrosa and HMS Barbadoes captured the schooner Gallant Hull, of 10 men and 79 tons (bm).

Barrosa returned to Portsmouth on 11 September 1815 from the West Indies. She then went into ordinary.

=== Post-war ===
Barrosa was fitted as a slop ship between August and September 1823. She then became a receiving ship and ordnance depot until 1833.

== Fate ==
The "Commissioners for executing the office of Lord High Admiral of the United Kingdom of Great Britain and Ireland" offered "Barrosa, 38 guns, 947 tons" for sale on 13 May 1841 at Portsmouth. On 25 May 1841 John Beatson purchased her for £1,426.
