= HMS Epervier =

HMS Epervier has been the name of more than one British Royal Navy ship, and may refer to:

- HMS Epervier (1797), sometimes spelled HMS Epervoir, a 16-gun brig-sloop captured from the French in 1797 and sold in 1801
- HMS Epervier (1803), a 16-gun brig-sloop launched in 1802, captured from the French in 1803, and sold in 1811.
- HMS Epervier (1812), an 18-gun brig-sloop launched in 1812 and captured by the United States Navy in 1814
