= Battle of Valparaíso =

1814 battle of the War of 1812

- Part of the War of 1812
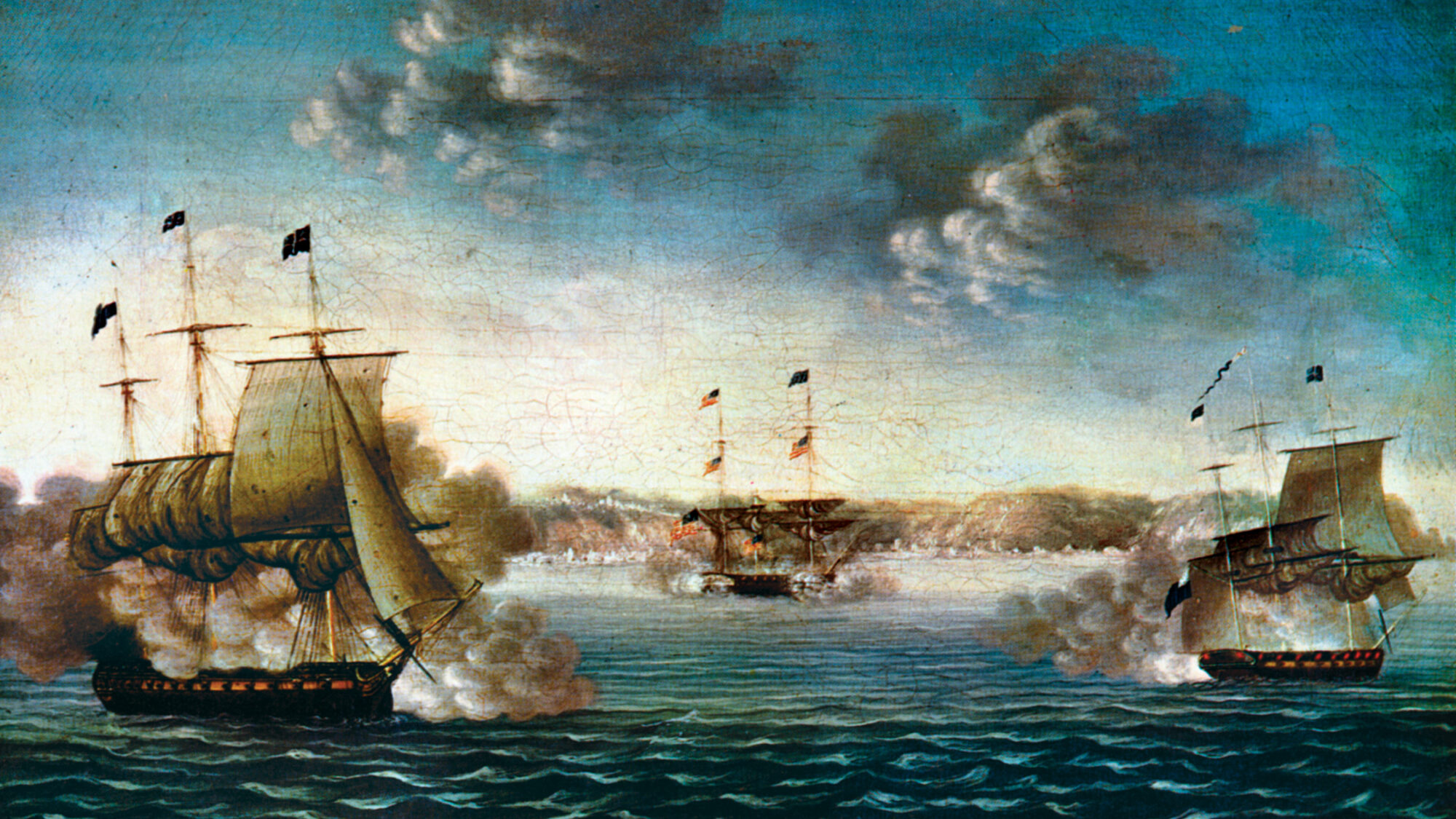
- c. 1819 painting of the battle
Date	28 March 1814
Location	off Valparaíso, Chile
Result	British victory

Belligerents
United Kingdom	United States

Commanders and leaders
James Hillyar	David Porter

Strength
1 frigate 1 ship-sloop	1 frigate 1 sloop

Casualties and losses
5 killed 10 wounded	58 killed 60 wounded 156 captured 1 frigate captured 1 sloop captured

The Battle of Valparaíso, also called the Capture of USS Essex, was a naval action fought during the War of 1812. It took place off Valparaíso, Chile on March 28, 1814, between the frigate USS Essex and the sloop USS Essex Junior of the United States Navy and the frigate HMS Phoebe and sloop HMS Cherub of the Royal Navy. The British ships won the battle, and the American vessels were captured.

== Prelude ==
=== David Porter's cruise into the Pacific ===
Captain David Porter of USS Essex had proposed a Pacific voyage to the Secretary of the Navy for exploration and colonization before the War of 1812 had begun. Once the war was declared, Porter flew his iconic white ensign with the words "Free Trade and Sailors rights" from Essex which was copied on USS Chesapeake by James Lawrence. Porter was assigned to Commodore William Bainbridge's squadron in USS Constitution, but he found no sign of Bainbridge at the rendezvous location at Porto Praya on the Cape Verde island or on the Brazil coast.

Porter captured the Post Office packet Nocton on 12 December 1812 laden with £15,000 of specie. Nocton was sent home as a prize but recaptured by HMS Belvidera on 5 January. He took another prize off Rio de Janeiro. He then rounded Cape Horn, following his command to act "for the good of the service". He was aware that the Spanish colonies were in revolt and that they might welcome a warship from the United States, and he was also aware that the British had a lucrative whaling industry and no warships in the Pacific. He planned to masquerade Essex as the more powerful Constitution until he arrived in the Pacific.

Porter arrived in Valparaíso on 15 March 1813 where he received a warm welcome from the revolutionary government, and he took advantage of this to take on food, water, and stores for Essex. He refitted Essex for eight days, then sailed north where he captured a Peruvian privateer. He recaptured an American whaler on his way to the Galapagos Islands, and he captured 12 British whalers between 29 April and 18 September. The prizes gave him access to stores and food, but water remained short. He armed two of his prizes as auxiliary support and detached them to capture others, and two more ships were returned to their captains to ferry the prisoners to Valparaíso. Porter claimed that he did $5 million (£1.13 million) worth of damage to British commercial shipping, making him the only American frigate captain to effectively raid commerce during the War of 1812. Despite that, the only prize to reach the United States was the whale ship Atlantic which Porter armed and renamed Essex Junior.

By September 1813, Essex needed a major refit and Porter picked up rumors that a British squadron was searching for him. He refitted Essex at the Marquesas Islands, far from the American coast so as not to encounter the British. He reached Nuka Hiva on 25 October 1813 and Essex underwent a major overhaul. Porter, meanwhile, fought the island's residents and annexed it for the United States. He renamed the island Madison Island in the hope that its annexation would be ratified by President Madison's administration, but the annexation was not approved. Porter next sailed to Valparaíso in the hope of encountering a British frigate, and he left Nuka Hiva on 13 December with a small squadron of prizes. He had left officers in charge of the island, but their control did not last long; they were eventually overthrown and fled to Hawaii—only to be captured by the British.

On 12 January 1814, Essex arrived in Valparaíso with Essex Junior in company. The Carrera family had supported him nine months earlier, but they were now in jail. A civil war had broken out in Chile and a Spanish counter-attack was expected.

=== The British global intelligence network ===
To get to the Pacific, Porter had to cross the waters of the British Brazil Station which was full of ships trading in specie from South America. After the outbreak of war, the trade in silver was transferred to Navy ships including HMS Bonne Citoyenne and HMS Nereus. Through these ships, the whereabouts of USS Constitution, USS Hornet and USS Essex was relayed to the rest of the British fleet. On 3 April 1813, Captain Heywood of Nereus reported that Essex had arrived in Valparaíso on 15 March intent on a short stay to Rear Admiral Manley Dixon in the 74-gun HMS Montagu. Dixon commanded a squadron of the 24-pounder frigate HMS Indefatigable, four 18-pounder frigates, three sixth rates, and three sloops. By late April it was clear Essex was encountered off Cape Frio in January, not Constitution. Dixon was unable to detach the sloops HMS Cherub and HMS Racoon to pursue Essex as he required all the ships he could to protect the silver trade.

Captain Heywood of Nereus forwarded a letter from Brown and Watson, British merchants at Valparaíso, to Dixon on 3 June 1813 reporting the welcoming of Essex in the harbor and that Essex had "gone to take and destroy the English whalers on the coast". Rumors had circulated that Porter would sail across the Pacific to the coast of China with orders to "destroy, but capture nothing".

Racoon had gone to San Salvador and Pernambuco and upon her return had reported that it was clear of United States privateers and men-of-war. Since the trade route was secure, Dixon could direct his attention to the Pacific. On 10 June HMS Phoebe and the merchant ship Isaac Todd joined Dixon's squadron. Phoebe was sent to destroy the trading post at Astoria. Dixon detached Cherub and Racoon to guard the whaling fishery, while Phoebe's mission was modified, becoming to seek out and capture or destroy Essex. Captain James Hillyar of Phoebe was to keep his mission a secret. The Admiralty would question why Cherub and Racoon were not detached earlier. Dixon would assert that the specie trade was a priority and that only once Phoebe had arrived, would Cherub and Racoon safely get to the Pacific as if Essex had encountered the two sloops on their own, the ships being much smaller, would have surely been captured. Dixon feared that Essex had reinforcements, which it did not, hence, he intended on detaching another frigate to accompany Phoebe in the event that Essex was not alone, but none were available. Hillyar was given complete discretion as Dixon was aware that new intelligence would reach Phoebe much faster than orders from Montagu in Rio de Janeiro would, the only exception being that Phoebe must not violate the neutrality of the Spanish colonies.

Nereus would arrive in Rio carrying 2,000,000 Spanish dollars and £100,000 in cash. Dixon would transfer this to Montagu as Montagu was a much more powerful ship and detach Montagu to Britain and switch his command with Heywood of Nereus so as not to have to detach Nereus and an escort to Britain. This way, the maximum number of ships remained at Rio de Janeiro. Dixon would continue his command from smaller frigates.

Captain William Bowles of HMS Aquilon was stationed at the Buenos Aires station to forward information to London about the trans-Andean trade routes and the American threat, larger issues of British trade and the disposition of Chilean politics. He intercepted letters that revealed Hillyar's secret mission. He feared that the information would get to Porter in USS Essex and Essex would escape.

Bowles successfully blocked Porter's ability to sell some prizes at Valparaíso through letters from Buenos Aires. After the fall of the Carrera family in 1813, the political situation in Chile began to favor the British. Furthermore, news of HMS Shannon's victory over USS Chesapeake had arrived in Valparaíso. It was seen that the United States influence was on the decline.

On 12 July 1813 Hillyar in Phoebe sealed orders for rendezvous and locations to renew stores for Isaac Todd, Cherub, and Racoon without contact of the South American mainland. While rounding Cape Horn, the ships became separated from Isaac Todd and in October, Hillyar received information that Essex had taken her. Hillyar then detached Racoon to the Columbia River to destroy the trading post at Astoria. Racoon arrived to discover that the fort had already been secured by the North West Company on 30 November. Hillyar found that Essex had been sighted at the Juan Fernández Islands, Valparaíso, and the Galapagos, but didn't know where exactly to find her.

Finally, in 1814, Dixon would have enough ships to detach the frigates Tagus and Nereus to reinforce Hillyar, but they would not arrive until after Essex was taken.

Bowles received information that Essex had arrived in Valparaíso, Chile had fallen into civil war and the Carrera family were no longer in power and forwarded it to Dixon in Rio de Janeiro and to the Admiralty in London. Bowles feared that Essex would leave Valparaíso and capture him in HMS Aquilon. This would give the impression of British weakness and hence the British would lose their influence in South America. Hillyar in Phoebe also received Essex's whereabouts and had no intention of allowing Essex to escape from Valparaíso.

=== The opposing forces ===
Despite Essex and Phoebe being nearly equal in length and tonnage, the British had the decisive advantage of carrying long guns rather than the carronades Essex was armed with. Furthermore, Cherub was far superior to Essex Junior.

Comparison of combatant vessels (English measurement methods used for both ships;)

	HMS Phoebe	USS Essex
Length (gundeck)	142 ft 9 in (43.5 m)	138 ft 7 in (42.2 m)
Beam	38 ft 3 in (11.7 m)	37 ft 3 in (11.4 m)
Tonnage	926 8/94 tons	897 22/94 tons
Complement	264 men	260 men
Armament	26 × 18-pounder long guns 10 × 32-pounder carronades 10 × 9-pounder long guns	40 × 32-pounder carronades 6 × 12-pounder long guns
Broadside weight	454 lb (206 kg)	664 lb (301 kg)

	HMS Cherub	USS Essex Junior
Length (gundeck)	108 ft 4 in (33.0 m)	?
Beam	29 ft 7 in (9.0 m)	?
Tonnage	423 79/94 tons	378 tons
Complement	121 men	60 men
Armament	16 × 32-pounder carronades 8 × 12-pounder carronades 2 × 6-pounder long guns	10 × 18-pounder carronades 10 × 6-pounder long guns
Broadside weight	304 lb (138 kg)	120 lb (54 kg)

== Battle ==
=== The blockade ===
On 3 February the 36-gun frigate Phoebe and the 18 gun ship-rigged sloop Cherub arrived at Valparaíso. Hillyar anticipated Porter's moves. Knowing that British diplomatic support was more useful to the Chileans than American support, he knew Essex could not stay long in Valparaíso. British merchant George O'Brien in the Emily sailed out of Valparaíso with intelligence about Essex for Hillyar in Phoebe. Mr. Cromptom and Andrew Bless gave Hillyar the latest on the political situation in Chile.

Porter had hoped for a duel, two ships against two ships and had knowingly sailed into Valparaíso to encounter the British. He now found himself blockaded by a squadron of a superior force consisting only of the very two ships he had hoped to engage. Hillyar sailed into the harbor at Valparaíso in Phoebe very close to Essex. Essex had rigged kedge anchors at the ends of its yards to grapple Phoebe and engage. Noticing Essex was ready for battle, Hillyar hauled off.

Hillyar had attempted to cause Essex to fire first and violate the Chilean neutrality, but Porter held his fire. Despite avoiding a diplomatic conflict, Porter nevertheless missed his opportunity to escape to sea while Phoebe was in port. Essex was faster than Cherub and was known to make at least 11.4 knots (21.1 km/h; 13.1 mph), Phoebe on the other hand could sail up to 13 knots (24 km/h; 15 mph) as she was built to a lengthened design of the Perseverance-class frigate for the very purpose of increasing speed. Therefore, it was unlikely that Essex could have successfully escaped without a fight.

The next day, Porter hoisted his ensign written "Free Trade and Sailors' Rights" to the fore topgallant masthead. To counter what Hillyar considered an "insidious effort to shake the loyalty of thoughtless British seamen", Phoebe hoisted a St George's ensign written "God and Country, British Sailors' Best Rights. Traitors Offend Both." Hillyar played God Save the King and the crew manned the rigging and gave three cheers. Porter then paraded his crew in Valparaíso with flags of American slogans. This propaganda attempt at gaining Chilean support was to little effect.

These displays of morals and philosophy were a reference to the causes of the War of 1812. The Americans had declared war on Britain partly because the British had been impressing American citizens from merchant ships and had cut off the American trade with France, hence, the Americans demanded "Free trade and sailors' rights". The British had asserted that the people they impressed were deserters from the Royal Navy who had been granted citizenship in the United States, hence Hillyar sent his message to the deserters that "God and Country [are a] British Sailor's Best Rights. Traitors Offend Both." Despite these bold displays of their respective national ideology, it is unlikely that the average seaman aboard either ship cared. They were more to intimidate opposing captains.

Porter agreed to exchange his British prisoners aboard Essex with Hillyar's American prisoners aboard Phoebe. At this point, all ships were docked in Valparaíso. In doing so, Hillyar confirmed that Essex was only armed with short-range carronades, a vital piece of intelligence. Having renewed stores, Phoebe and Cherub returned to sea on 14 February as Hillyar feared that if Essex sortied, Porter would have Phoebe and Cherub detained for 24 hours as not to violate Chilean neutrality. Lying just outside the range of the Chilean coastal guns(which was a common marker of the end of the neutral range) Phoebe and Cherub could still send boats into the harbor to receive fresh beef and water.

On 25 February, Porter had the prize Hector towed to sea and burnt in Valparaíso harbor. This being a violation of Chilean neutrality, the Chilean governor was insulted and angry and sent dispatches to Hillyar saying he would ignore the action if Essex would be taken into the harbor. Despite his permission, Hillyar did not engage as such a violation of neutrality might be beyond the power of the governor to ignore as the United States would protest.

On 27 February Essex and Essex Junior had set sail. Phoebe was denying Porter the opportunity for a close-range engagement where his carronades would be effective. Porter fired a signal gun to Essex Junior and proceeded to fire two shots at Phoebe. Hillyar did not return fire. The American ships returned to port.

Porter would make complaints about Hillyar violating neutrality to the Chileans in an attempt to allow Essex to sortie. Hillyar asserted that Porter violated neutrality three times. First by burning Hector on 25 February, by firing two shots at Phoebe on 27 February, and by attempting to board Phoebe on 12 March. Fortunately for Hillyar, dispatches had been sent to him with information about the boarding plan.

Porter then wrote a challenge to Hillyar offering a single ship duel. Numerous challenges had been written during the war of 1812. First was Captain James Dacres of HMS Guerriere to Commodore John Rodgers of USS President; Rodgers declined despite his ship being bigger and better armed. The second was Master Commandant James Lawrence of USS Hornet to Pitt Burnaby Greene of HMS Bonne Citoyenne; although Commodore William Bainbridge of the companion ship USS Constitution pledged not to intervene, the British captain declined to risk his ship. The final challenge was by Philip Broke of HMS Shannon to James Lawrence in USS Chesapeake; Lawrence accepted. In this sole match of equal ships during the war, Chesapeake was defeated and captured after a short but intense battle.

Single ship duels such as USS Constitution vs HMS Guerriere, the capture of HMS Macedonian, and the capture of USS Chesapeake were a means for captains achieved glory and honor. Hillyar declined this challenge–unlike the all other frigate captains in the War of 1812, Hillyar had already proved himself in the Battle of Tamatave in 1811. There was no need for heroics on his part. Porter would later claim that he could have easily escaped as he had the faster ship but this was not the case. Phoebe was faster than Essex.

Dixon detached the frigate HMS Briton to reinforce Hillyar. Nereus and Tagus were already on their way. Dixon received information that the United States 44-gun super-frigates would sortie from American ports and attempt to join up with Porter. Unfortunately for Porter, the big 44-gun ships were effectively blockaded in harbors by British squadrons which included 74-gun ships of the line.

As Tagus and Nereus, 18-pounder frigates, both more powerful than Essex, began to approach the Pacific, Porter received information of their arrival. It became clear that Essex must escape before reinforcements arrived.

Hillyar was warned that Porter would sortie on 23 March by British merchants desperate to resume trade once the threat of being captured by Essex no longer existed. Hillyar was already prepared.

=== Engagement ===
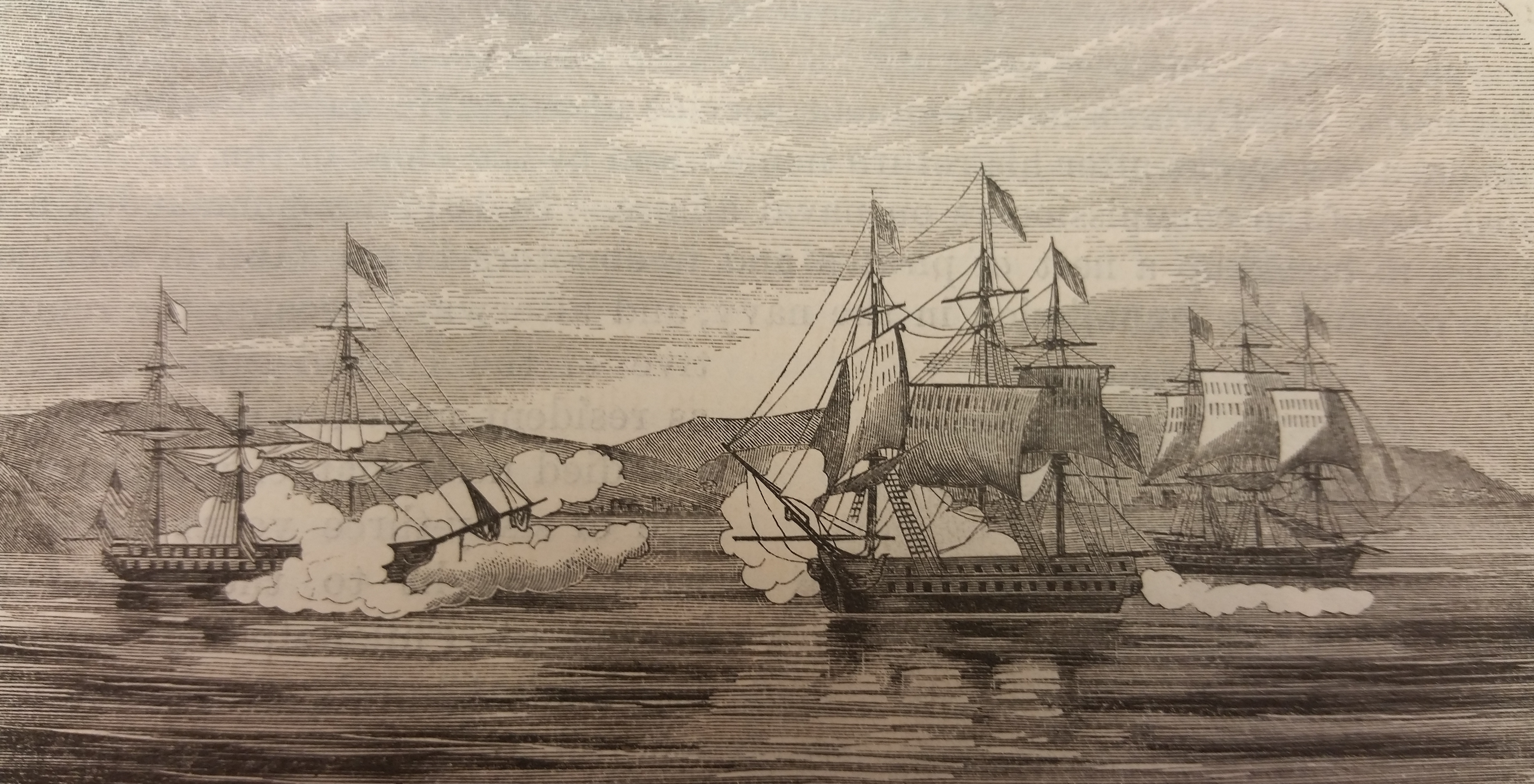
Battle of Valparaíso

On 27 March, Porter attempted to mislead Hillyar into thinking he would not sortie by sending his purser onshore and made sure that Hillyar received information of this. That night, Porter sent Lieutenant Maury out to sea in one of Essex's boats carrying blue lights and launching rockets. Porter hoped that Hillyar would follow this display to leeward allowing Essex to escape at daybreak. Hillyar spotted the lights, but sighting no ships he realised this was a decoy. He sent both Phoebe and Cherub to windward of where Essex was moored anticipating Porter's plans.

The next morning, 28 March 1814, Porter was disappointed to find Phoebe and Cherub close to the weather point of the bay. Hillyar wore inside and out of the point. The wind picked up from the south-southwest and Porter struck his royal masts and yards at 2:45 pm. Soon after, one of Essex's cables parted. Essex then made a break for the sea. Hillyar immediately sailed to cut Porter off. A sudden squall made away with Essex's main-topmast which broke off at the lower cap. Two men, Samuel Miller and Thomas Browne were lost with the topmast.

Hillyar made chase at 3:10. Both Phoebe and Cherub hoisted St George's flag written on them were the words "God and Country, British Sailors Best Rights. Traitors Offend Both"

Porter, having lost his topmast, had no hope of escape. He wore Essex to starboard and cut away the wreckage. Porter was unable to sail back into the port and dropped anchor in a small bay out of sight of the nearest Chilean fort at 3:45 at 9 1/2 fathoms (57 ft; 17.4 m) from the shore. Essex flew three ensigns, "FREE TRADE AND SAILORS RIGHTS" from the foretop, "GOD OUR COUNTRY AND LIBERTY. TYRANTS OFFEND THEM" from the mizzen top and the United States colors from the mizzen peak.

Hillyar considered that because Essex was out of the range of Chilean cannon, she was in international waters. At 4:10 Hillyar signaled Cherub to fight at anchor roving extra cables to the anchor so the ship could be worn around and the broadside brought to bear. He sailed Phoebe intent on bringing her broadside to bear on Essex's stern. The battle began at 4:20 at half-gunshot (250 yards; 230 m) while Phoebe was still underway. Phoebe opened on Essex's stern and starboard quarter. Cherub fired on Essex's bow. Heavy fire from Essex's long 12-pounder chase guns caused badly wounded Commander Tucker of Cherub to move alongside Phoebe. Tucker nevertheless remained on deck throughout the action.

Porter was desperate to bring his guns to bear. He attempted to have a spring rove into his anchor cable and Essex worn, but they were shot away before they could be used. Essex's 32-pounders, despite Porter claiming they were of no use, were of devastating effectiveness against Phoebe. Phoebe's popular first lieutenant was mortally wounded by splinters. Hillyar was forced to increase the range at which he fought to take advantage of the range of his long 18-pounders over the 32-pounder carronades.

Hillyar had not seen that his firing was effective, but Essex had effectively launched dismantling projectiles from the long 12-pounders and Phoebe's topsails were flying loose as their sheets had been cut, the mainsail cut up, the jibboom damaged, and the fore main and mizzen stays shot away. Once out of carronade range, Hillyar had his crew mend the rigging and furl the mainsail.

Before Hillyar engaged again, he hailed Tucker to keep Cherub underway instead of fighting at anchor. Hillyar approached again in Phoebe engaging with his 9-pounder chase guns and received steady fire from Essex at 5:35. At this point the wind died down, occasionally being completely calm. Hillyar anchored at a greater range of a 1/2 mile (0.80 km) that he had done the first time. Phoebe's long 18-pounders were effective against Essex while Essex's carronades were not against Phoebe because of the distance.

When the wind picked up, Porter cut his cable and sailed toward Phoebe to board her. At 5:50 Hillyar set sail and avoided Essex. Essex's rigging had been shredded by Phoebe making Essex hard to control while underway. Phoebe continued to devastate the drifting Essex cutting down her crew. Hillyar had purposefully targeted the standing rigging and upper deck throughout the battle. Many of the guns aboard Essex had been disabled. A small pile of powder exploded near Essex's main hatch. Essex's crew began to lose morale.

Porter ordered Essex to be run ashore and blown up as James Lawrence had said about USS Chesapeake when HMS Shannon took her. Porter was forced to surrender when the wind died down again and there was no hope of sailing on shore. Furthermore, too many of the crew were so badly wounded that they could not abandon ship. Nevertheless, 60 or 70 Americans abandoned ship and took boats to the shore. Some swam and drowned, but most were collected by British boats. Approximately 40 escaped to the land. At 6:20 Porter struck his colors. The chaos of Essex's rigging and the numerous banners, flags, and ensigns that Porter hoisted caused the British to take ten minutes to realize that Essex had struck. A boat was sent to secure the prize.

Porter had been traumatized by the casualties, humiliated by defeat and overwrought by his exertions. Due to the shell shock, he openly wept as he offered his sword to Hillyar. By the next morning, Porter had regained his composure and began debating the specifics of the battle as not to be court-martialled for the loss of Essex.

Throughout the whole battle Essex Junior was not engaged by the British as they considered her too weak to be a threat.

=== Casualties ===
Phoebe suffered four killed and seven wounded, Cherub had one killed and three wounded. Essex had 58 dead and 65 wounded. Phoebe had holes below the waterline as well as her rigging severely cut. Essex had been hit with more than 200 shot and had her stern smashed in, a hole in her counter, her wheel and rudder damaged, all three masts damaged, the figurehead shot away, 15 guns disabled, 55 gun crew killed, 60 gun crew wounded, and the upper works and rigging severely damaged.

== Aftermath ==
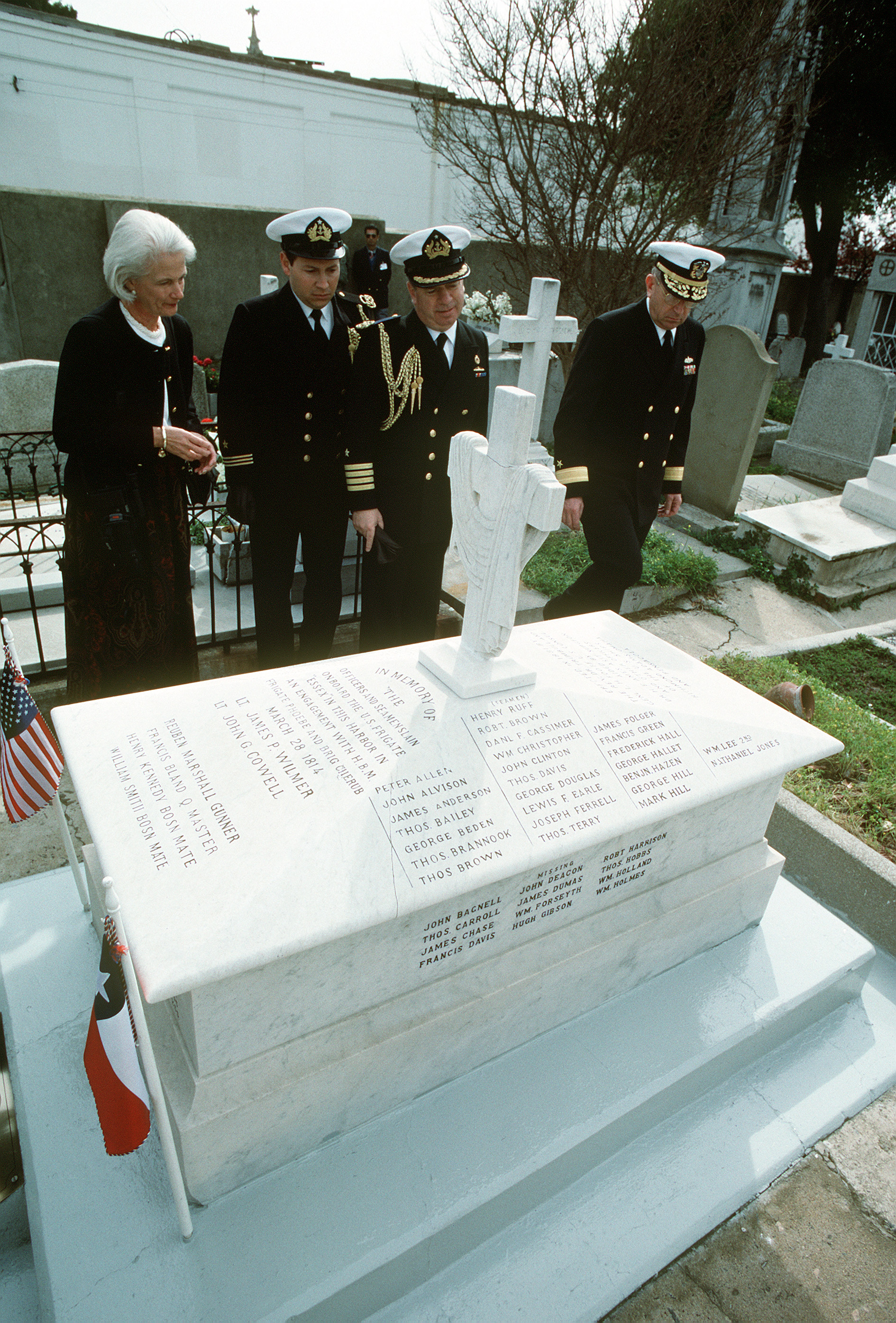
Memorial in Dissidents Cemetery in Valparaíso

In his final report, David Porter claimed that the British had violated neutrality, conducted themselves dishonorably and inhumanely, and plundered his personal property after the engagement. He stated that the loss of Essex was simply due to a series of misfortunes and blamed Paul Hamilton for his all short range carronade armament. He wrote to Secretary Jones "I hope, Sir, that our conduct may prove satisfactory to our country." Porter finally claimed that the United States had the right to reclaim Essex from the British.

The only viable parts of Porter's report was that Essex was only armed with short-range carronades and that he had lost his top-mast. The British had not violated neutrality, conducted themselves dishonorably, nor plundered his personal belongings. There were no further misfortunes aboard Essex. The entire engagement could have been averted save Porter's desire to achieve personal glory by defeating the British rather than following his orders not to engage. Porter could have very well not returned to Valparaíso where he would be blockaded, as he knew Phoebe and Cherub would arrive. The United States by no means had any right to reclaim Essex given the circumstances of the battle.

In contrast, Hillyar praised Porter for good conduct and claimed he only surrendered when all his options were expended. Hillyar found Essex with provisions for a six-month cruise. He moved all the ships to Valparaíso and transferred the prisoners to a Spanish prison hulk. On 2 April 1814, Hillyar repaired shot holes below Phoebe's waterline. On 13 April Tagus and Nereus arrived. On 26 April the prisoners were moved to Essex Junior and ferried away. Hillyar would help reconcile the Peruvian and Chilean governments, which the British gave more attention to as the War of the Sixth Coalition had ended and Napoleon was exiled. On 21 May Briton arrived at Valparaíso. Finally on 31 May, Phoebe sailed home to Britain.

By 20 June, Dixon received news of Hillyar's victory which passed over the Andes. Dixon confirmed the Treaty of Lircay. Briton, Tagus, and Cherub were ordered to remain in the South Pacific to watch the whaling fleet. News of the success reached London in August.

Essex served in the Royal Navy as HMS Essex until 1837. Essex Junior encountered HMS Saturn on her return to the United States while carrying the prisoners. While Saturn inspected Essex Junior, Porter escaped from the ship by boat. American coastal batteries were suspicious of the ship and opened fire. The United States believed Porter's explanation. Secretary Jones claimed that they had returned "in triumph though captives". He then decided that Saturn had violated the terms of Porter's parole and that Porter and his crew should be free to serve. Admiral Alexander Cochrane was furious, he intended on keeping Porter, a dangerous captain, as a prisoner. Because the case was never closed, Porter would be able to publish his version of his voyage to gain public support for his case. Porter was awarded the command of the new 44-gun frigate USS Columbia which would later be burnt by the British before she was completed. The war would end before Porter would get a chance to go to sea again.

Porter declared himself a hero, repeating his claims of the battle. He claimed that he inflicted $2.5 million in damage and cost the British $6 million to counter his cruise, having to redeploy ships that could counter the United States. In fact, the returns were negligible as only one prize returned to the United States and by 1814, the British had over 100 frigates available as they were no longer fighting Napoleon. Hence the four that sailed to Valparaíso was of insignificant force. Nevertheless, Porter's cruise proved to be the most successful of any American frigate captain of the war.

Herman Melville criticized Porter's refusal to strike his colors when it became clear that the situation was hopeless, instead of seeking to "crown himself with the glory of the shambles, by permitting his hopeless crew to be butchered before his eyes." "Nor, by thus continuing to fight, did this American frigate, one iota, promote the true interests of her country."

There is a memorial to the American dead in the Dissidents Cemetery in Valparaíso.
