= Essex Junior =

History

United Kingdom
- Name: Atlantic, or Atalanta or Atlanta
- Owner: Samuel Enderby & Sons, London
- Captured: 29 April 1813

United States
- Name: Essex Junior
- Namesake: USS Essex
- Acquired: 29 April 1813 by capture
- Captured: 12 January 1814
- Fate: Sold on 26 August 1814

General characteristics
- Tons burthen: 355 (bm)
- Complement: Atlantic: 24 men; Essex Junior: 60 officers and men
- Armament: Atlantic: 8 × 18-pounder carronades; Essex Junior: 10 × 6-pounder guns + 10 × 18-pounder carronades
- Notes: War of 1812; Nuku Hiva Campaign; Battle of Valparaiso

The sloop Essex Junior was a French prize that the British whaling firm of Samuel Enderby and Sons purchased and used as a whaler under the name Atlantic. In 1813, on her second whaling voyage, the frigate USS Essex captured her off the Galapagos Islands. The Americans named her Essex Junior. The British recaptured her on 28 March 1814 when they captured Essex. They then sent Essex Junior to New York as a cartel. There the Americans seized her and sold her.

== Atlantic ==
Atlantic was a French prize that Samuel Enderby & Sons purchased for use as a whaler. She appears in the Register of Shipping in 1810 under the name Atalanta, with O. Gwyer, master, Enderby, owner, and trade London–South Seas.

Captain Obed Wyer (or Gwyer, or Weir, or Wier) sailed from London on 12 April 1810 bound for Peru. Atlantic was reported to have been off the coast of Peru in September 1811 with 1000 barrels of sperm oil. On 17 May 1812 she left St Helena for home. She returned on 21 July 1812.

Captain Wyer sailed again for the Galapagos on 6 October 1812. Essex, Captain David Porter, captured her off the Galapagos Islands on 29 April 1813. Porter took Atlantic to use as a tender, named her Essex Junior, and placed her under the command of Commander John Downes.

Atlantic was already pierced for 20 guns though only mounting six, so Porter augmented her existing armament with 6-pounder guns and additional 18-pounder carronades. (Note: The Americans had already captured a number of British whalers, most armed, which presumably were the source of the additional guns.) He also put on board a crew of 60 officers and men.

== Encounter with the Royal Navy ==
After cruising in the waters off the western coast of South America Essex Junior accompanied Essex to the island of Nuka Hiva in the Marquesas Group where repairs were made. Essex Junior returned with Porter in Essex, leaving on 12 December and reaching the coast of Chile on 12 January 1814.

On 8 February 1814 Phoebe and Cherub arrived at Valparaíso, a neutral port, where Essex and her prizes were anchored. Having trapped Essex in the harbour, the British waited six weeks for her to come out and thwarted all her efforts to escape. Eventually, on 28 March, Porter attempted to break out of the harbour. A squall took off his main topmast and he attempted to return to harbour but Phoebe and Cherub drove Essex into a nearby bay and defeated her in a short engagement. Phoebe and Cherub also captured Essex Junior.

In the engagement, Phoebe had four men killed, including her first lieutenant, and seven men wounded. Cherub had one killed and three wounded, including her captain. The British reported that Essex had 24 killed and 45 wounded, though the Americans reported higher casualties. Lieutenant Pearson of Phoebe commanded the prize crew that sailed Essex back to Britain, where he was promoted to Commander.

Her captors used Essex Junior as a cartel to transport their prisoners of war to New York. Just outside New York, a British warship detained them overnight. Porter took the view that the detention abrogated the cartel he had signed with Hillyer of Phoebe, and contrived to escape on shore. The British released Essex Junior, and she sailed into harbour, past various forts that mistook her for an enemy ship and fired on her, without effect. (Note: One the crew members of Essex present at this action was the young teenage Midshipman David Farragut, the foster son of Captain Porter, who would rise to the rank of Admiral and achieve renown during the American Civil War. He remarked at some point that forts' ineffective fire suggested that shore batteries were far less formidable than they appeared, an experience that may have influenced his tactics during the Civil War.)

When she arrived at New York in July 1814, the marshal of the district seized her. She was condemned, and sold for US$25,000 on 26 August. (Note: Porter's share was US$1875. However, this is curious because the cartel rules were designed to encourage the swift repatriation of prisoners and so specified that after a cartel had delivered her prisoners, she was to be free to sail to her captor's country.)
