= Nuku Hiva Campaign =

1813–14 US intervention in Polynesia

- Part of the War of 1812
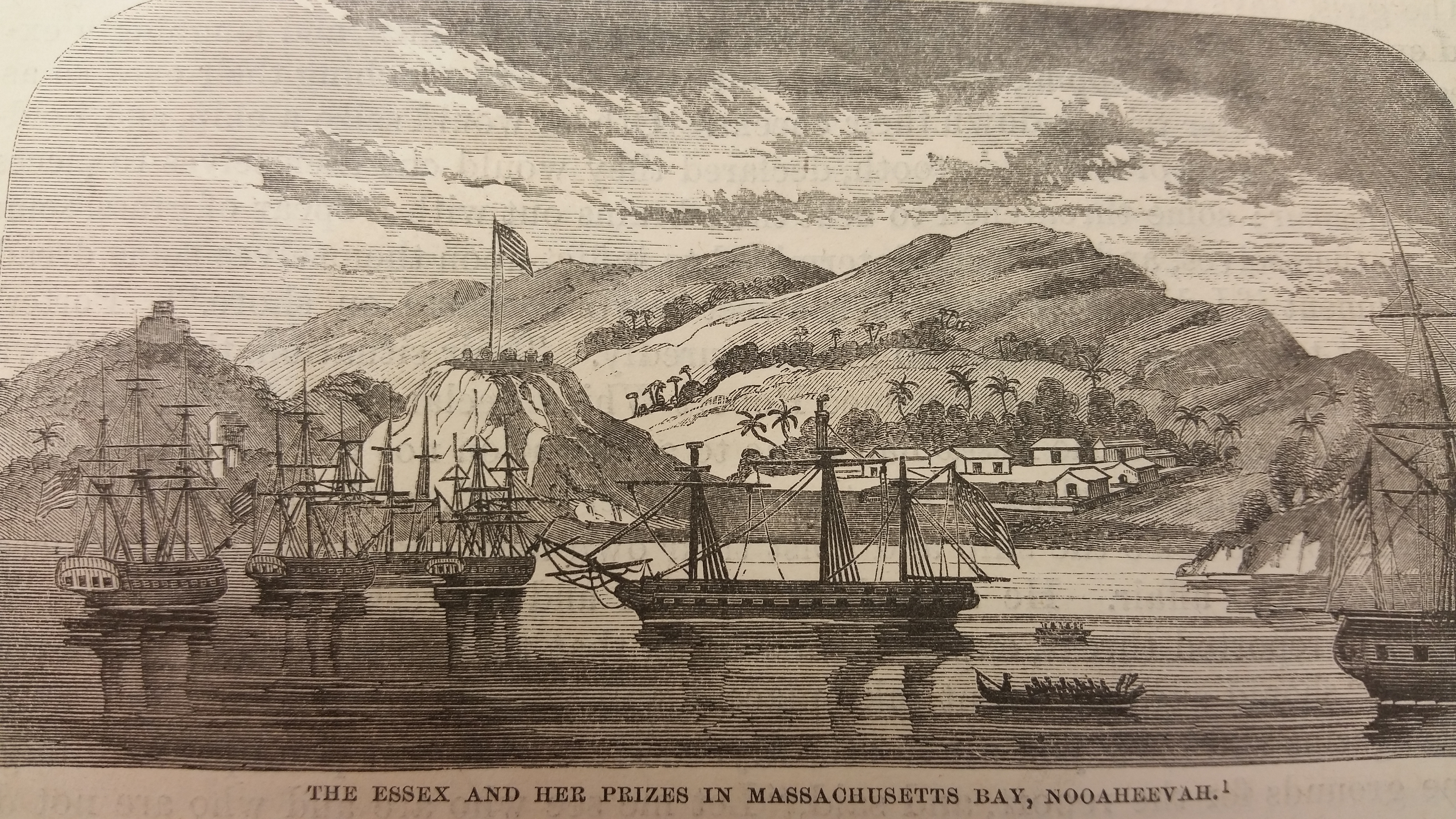
- The American fleet off Nuku Hiva in 1813
| Date | October 1813 – May 1814 |
| Location | Nuku Hiva, Marquesas Islands |
| Result | Inconclusive: American military victory over Tai Pis and Happahs; Fort Madison destroyed and American evacuation of Nuku Hiva in May 1814 |

Belligerents
| United States; Te I'i (1813–May 1814); Happah (November 1813) | Tai Pi Happah (October 1813) Te I'i (May 1814) British mutineers |

Commanders and leaders
| David Porter; John Downes (United States) John M. Gamble; Gattanewa | Unknown |

Strength
| Land: ~5,000 warriors ~250 sailors ~40+ marines 5 artillery pieces 1 fort Sea: 1 frigate 10 recaptured or captured whalers ~200 war-canoes | ~4,000 warriors 2 forts |

Casualties and losses
| American: 5 killed ~12 wounded 1 corvette captured | Estimated in the hundreds |

The Nuku Hiva Campaign was an armed conflict between the United States and the Polynesian inhabitants of Nuku Hiva during the War of 1812. It occurred in 1813, following Captain David Porter's decision to sail his fleet to the island for repairs before continuing his raid against British shipping. Upon arrival, the Americans became involved in a tribal war and allied themselves with the Te I'i people against the Happah and Tai Pi clans.

== Background ==
Operations in the Pacific began in early 1813 when Captain Porter entered the Pacific, via Cape Horn, in the thirty-two gun frigate USS Essex. Originally Porter was assigned to rendezvous with two other warships but both encountered enemy resistance before their meeting and Porter went around the Horn alone. The mission was to harass the British whaling industry off South America and around the Galápagos Islands. For months the Americans cruised the South Seas and they captured several British whalers that they placed under navy command. By October 1813, Essex was in serious need of repairs so Porter decided to head for Nuku Hiva, an island in the Marquesas, fearing that a British squadron would find him if he chose to take refuge in a South American port. The American fleet that went to the Marquesas included USS Essex and the liberated American whaler Barclay, and nine captured British whalers: Seringapatam (22 guns), Greenwich (10 guns), Montezuma (18 guns), Essex Junior (16 guns), Hector (11 guns), Charlton (10 guns), Sir Andrew Hammond, and Catherine and New Zealander, both of eight guns. In total, Captain Porter had just over 200 United States Navy officers and sailors, accompanied by a small detachment of no more than twenty marines under the command of Lieutenant John M. Gamble. One of the sailors was the young midshipman David Farragut, later the first United States Navy admiral. (Porter's son David Dixon Porter was the second U.S. Navy admiral.) Additionally, many of the prisoners from the prize enemy ships volunteered for service.

== Campaign ==
=== Founding of Madisonville ===
Porter arrived off Nuku Hiva, on October 25, 1813 and he renamed it Madison's Island after United States President James Madison. Then Porter began making preparations to establish the first American naval base in the Pacific, as well as a small colony, named Madisonville, to house the sailors. The small Fort Madison, of four guns, was also constructed on a hill next to Massachusetts Bay where an official flag raising ceremony took place on November 19, a seventeen gun salute was fired and some sort of message was buried in the ground for future Europeans to find, should they attempt to colonize the island after Porter and his men left. The declaration stated that the Te I'is were subjects of the United States and that the latter had officially laid claim to the island which Porter hoped would become an important naval base. In this time the sailors also scraped the copper bottom hull of Essex and used smoke to drive out over 1,000 rats hiding in her works. The Americans described the native warriors as being tall and copper colored, with tattoos over their entire bodies. They wore loin cloths and some had capes made of tree bark; the warriors also carried large clubs or spears. The women were clothed in similar fashion to the men, and friendly to the sailors. An Englishman named Wilson was found to be living on the island, and had been for many years. He served as interpreter between the Americans and the native chiefs.

=== Downes Expedition ===
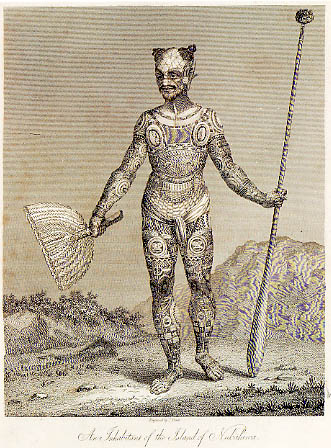
A warrior of Nuku Hiva by Wilhelm Gottlieb Tilesius von Tilenau, 1813

Nuku Hiva, at the time, was inhabited by many tribes of indigenous peoples, separated in villages by mountain peaks thousands of feet high. The area of land around Massachusetts Bay, which became the town of Madisonville, was controlled by Chief Gattanewa of the Te I'i and in return for rights to build the base, Gattanewa demanded that the Americans become his allies and help fight the war against the Happah. While the majority of the Americans were still building their settlement, Lieutenant John Downes, Marine Lieutenant John Gamble and a platoon of forty Marines, were ordered to proceed to an in-land redoubt, located high in the mountains. The main effort of this expedition dragged along a wheeled 6 pound cannon for added effect. The amazement of the aboriginals at gunpowder weapons had already been noted upon their landing on the island. Several hundred Te I'i warriors accompanied the expedition which left the coast in the first week of November. After a journey through the jungle Downes and his men found the fort occupied by 3,000 to 4,000 hostiles. The Te I'i and their American allies attacked; during the fighting a rock hit Downes in the stomach, hurting him. A sailor was wounded by a spear to the neck, but he apparently survived. Lt. Gamble was singled out by a heavily built Happah warrior, who charged at him with a wooden club. Drawing his Mameluke sword Gamble blocked the club from knocking him unconscious as another Marine, seeing Gamble struggling, leveled his musket at the Happah's head. The shot, fired from only a foot away, nearly decapitated the warrior.

The assault on the fort was successful and Downes reported that his men had killed five enemies and that the Te I'i massacred the wounded with clubs. Lieutenant Downes also said that he was very surprised that his allies did not eat the dead; instead they used their bones to make necklaces and fan handles. Over the next few days the chiefs of the Happah arrived at the coast to settle a peace agreement. One of the stipulations required the Happah to fight alongside the Te I'i and Americans in another operation against the Tai Pi.

=== Porter expedition ===
Not long after subduing the Happah, the Tai Pi declared war on the Te I'i, the Happah, and the Americans. Thus followed one of the most significant amphibious landings in the history of American operations in the Pacific during the 1800s. It was unopposed but Captain Porter's fleet, combined with around 5,000 friendly warriors, in at least 200 war-canoes, attacked the Tai Pi-held coastline. After that, thirty-six officers and men with a cannon, personally commanded by Porter, led the expedition to a fortress with seven-foot-high walls. A battle began when the Tai Pis ambushed the column in the jungle near the fort. Porter wrote "We entered the bushes, and at every instant assailed by spears and stones, which came from different parties in the ambuscade. We could hear the snapping of the slings, the whistling of the stones, and the spears came quivering by us, but we could not percieve [sic] from whom they came." Skirmishing broke out and the expedition continued forward, encountering heavier resistance the farther they went. The column eventually made it to the fort where a pitched battle began that would last for hours. The Te I'is and Happahs provided the brunt of the attack while the Americans picked off enemy warriors with their muskets; the cannon was aimed at the fortifications. Upon arrival, a Marine sergeant notified Lt. Gamble and Capt. Porter of the hopelessness of their situation. The Marines in his squad were down to three or four cartridges of ammunition. Lt. Gamble and four men were given permission to run back to the beach for a resupply but upon their arrival the situation with their natives allies had deteriorated.

Thousands of Tai Pis occupied the heavily defended position and they managed to repel the native attacks. Near the end of the engagement, the Te I'is and Happahs fled, leaving the thirty-six Americans to fend for themselves. Capt. Porter notified Lt. Gamble to order his Marines to cover the retreat back to the beach. Gamble positioned his men at the edge of a bush for one last decisive volley to ensure a strong enemy force did not pursue them. The American force lost one man killed and two wounded. One of the casualties was Lieutenant Downes, who suffered a badly broken leg. "We returned to the beach much fatigued and harassed with marching and fighting," said Porter, who then sailed back to Madisonville.

=== Battle of Typee Valley ===
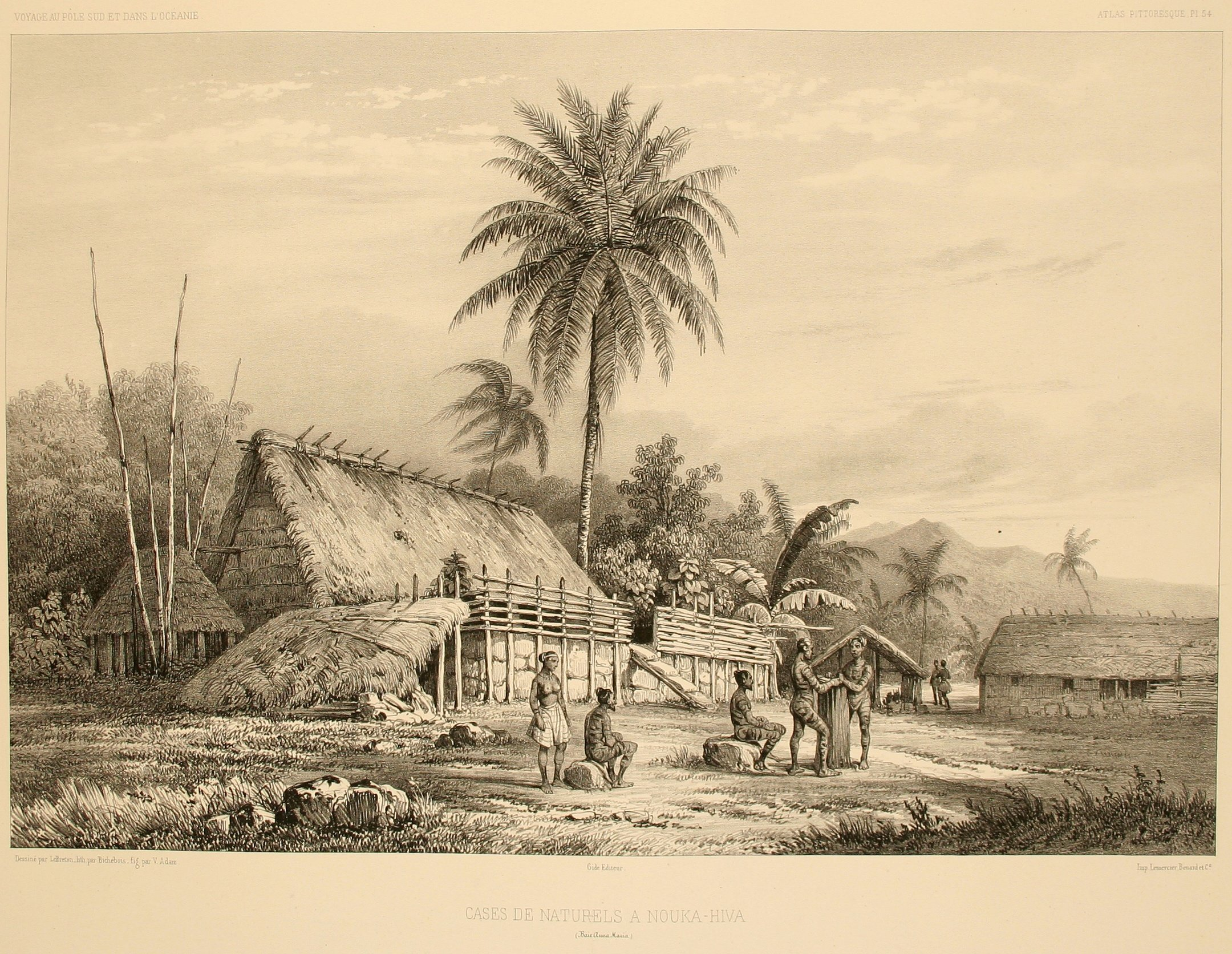
An 1846 lithograph of Nuka Hiva.

Once word spread that Porter and his allies had been defeated, the Te I'i and the Happah warriors began to turn on the Americans which led them to fear that Madisonville would be overrun and the inhabitants massacred. Porter wrote; "I had now no alternative, but to prove our superiority by a successful attack upon the Typees." Porter organized and led most of his men on a second mission into enemy territory, this time overland to Typee Valley and with limited assistance from the Te I'i. The valley is a dense nine miles across by three miles and was the heartland of the Tai Pi where their villages were located and where they harvested coconut and breadfruit. By making a detour to avoid the heavily defended fort near the coast, Porter could make a surprise attack and use terrain and his superior weapons to their advantage. During one night the column marched to the top of a ridge overlooking the valley but because the Americans were exhausted from a long march, Porter decided to wait until the next morning to attack. The following day was rainy and windy according to reports, moisture had temporarily ruined the gunpowder, so the expedition spent another day resting and waiting for the powder to dry. Finally on November 30, the expedition launched their attack and soon after the Americans and Te I'is found themselves in another ambush which they fought off. After that Captain Porter sent the Tai Pi leaders a message advising them to cease hostilities at once or else their villages would be burned. The captain waited for some time and when it became apparent that the message had been ignored, the advance was continued. American forces and the Te I'is eventually won the day when night came and the enemy disengaged. There were no American casualties.

Porter claimed he took no pleasure in conquering a "happy and heroic people" and he described the aftermath of the battle as "a scene of desolation and horror". The captain also wrote that he left behind a "line of smoking ruins" when he started the return march to Madisonville. Tai Pi emissaries were not far behind and they brought the Americans "countless" hogs as a peace offering. A British magazine later said that Porter was guilty of

"wantonly murdering unoffending savages" to which the captain replied; "Many may censure my conduct as wanton and unjust.... But let such reflect on our peculiar situation--a handful of men residing among numerous war-like tribes, liable every moment to be attacked by them and all cut off; our only hopes on safety was in convincing them of our great superiority over them and from what we have already seen, we must either attack them or be attacked.... Wars are not always just, and are rarely free from excesses--my conscience acquits me of any injustice, and no excesses were committed but what the Typees had in their power to stop by ceasing hostilities."

=== Seringapatam Mutiny ===
By 9 December 1813, USS Essex was repaired and ready for sailing. The sailors were not happy about leaving their Marquesan girlfriends and Porter had to suppress one mutiny by declaring that he "would at once put a match to the magazine, and blow them all to eternity." A former Royal Navy sailor by the name of Robert White, was brought before Porter, having been accused of mutinous talk about Essex Junior. White denied the accusations, now confirmed by other sailors, infuriating Porter. Porter thus drew his sword, face turning red, and yelled: "Run you scoundrel! Run for your life!" White ran off, jumped overboard, and swam to a nearby canoe.

The remaining 250 crew members remained loyal and Essex made sail on 9 December 1813 to continue raiding. Most of the fleet left, though Sir Andrew Hammond, Seringapatam, and Greenwich remained at Nuku Hiva with Lieutenant John Gamble, two midshipmen, nineteen sailors and six prisoners, with the prisoners and some of the sailors being British nationals.

The situation was quiet until on 7 May 1814, the British sailors among the garrison mutinied. First they released the six prisoners and then attacked Fort Madison before taking over Seringapatam and getting away. Gamble was wounded in the foot and he was left adrift in a small boat with four others but they eventually made it to Sir Andrew Hammond. Meanwhile the British interpreter Wilson was arousing trouble with the Te I'i by telling them that Porter would not come back. A few days later on 9 May, six of the American sailors were attacked on the beach by the Te I'i; a sixteen-year-old midshipman was killed along with four sailors while two others escaped, one of whom was wounded. Meanwhile, Gamble was alone on his ship, recovering from his wounded foot, when two war-canoes approached for an attack. The cannon of the ship were pre-loaded so single-handedly Gamble limped from gun to gun, firing them as fast as possible, until the enemy fell back. On the next morning he gave the order to evacuate Madisonville, there being only eight men left on shore and all were either wounded or ill. Thus ended the existence of America's first naval base and colony in the Pacific Ocean. Captain Porter never returned to the island due to his capture by the British at the Battle of Valparaíso on March 28, 1814.

== Post-script ==
The mutineers sailed Seringapatam to New South Wales. From there she was sailed back to Great Britain where she was returned to her owners on payment of salvage.

Cherub and Phoebe had caught up with Essex and Essex Junior at Valparaiso. Eventually Phoebe was able to bring Essex to battle. The British were able to capture Porter and both American vessels.

Before he left Nuku Hiva, Gamble set fire to Greenwich. He and seven men (four unfit for duty) then sailed Sir Andrew Hammond 2,500 miles (4,000 km) before they had the misfortune to meet up with HMS Cherub. (Note: A first-class share of the salvage money was worth £72 13s 5d; a sixth-class share, that of an ordinary seaman, was worth 16s 6d. Cherub shared the money with Phoebe by prior agreement.) Eventually, in 1815, Gamble was able to return to the United States.

On 28 August 1814, a Royal Navy flotilla with HMS Briton anchored off Nuku Hiva. They found that Porter had built Fort Madison, Nuku Hiva and a villa on the island, which the natives destroyed after his ship left.

Before his departure, Thomas Staines, with the consent of the local tribes excepting the "Typees" from the Tai Pi Valley, took possession of Nuku Hiva on behalf of the British Crown.

== See also ==
- Fort Astoria
- First Sumatran expedition
- Second Sumatran expedition
- First Fiji Expedition
- Second Fiji Expedition
- Formosa Expedition
- Nukapu Expedition

== Footnotes ==
Notes

Citations
