= Action off Charles Island =

Naval battle in the Pacific Ocean during the War of 1812

- Part of War of 1812
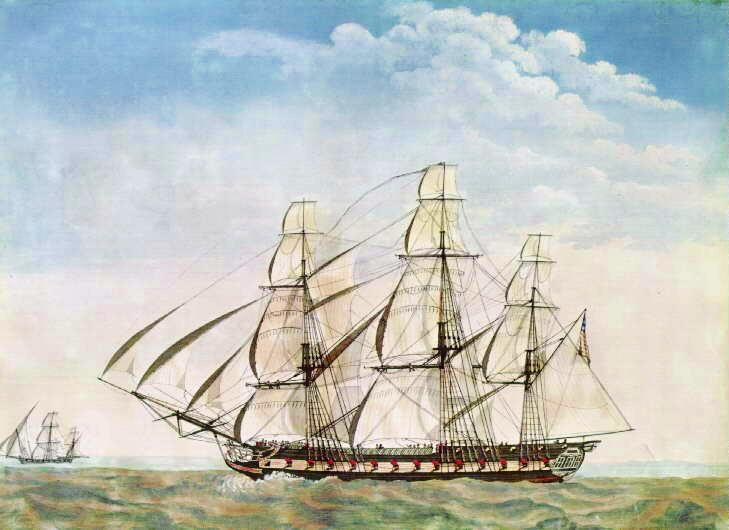
- USS Essex off Galapagos.
Date	July 14, 1813
Location	off Banks' Bay, Charles Island, Galapagos Archipelago, Pacific Ocean
Result	American victory

Belligerents
United States	United Kingdom

Commanders and leaders
David Porter	William Stavers

Strength
1 frigate 2 sloops-of-war	3 armed whaling brigs

Casualties and losses
None	89 men captured, of which 48 were released on parole after the battle 3 brigs captured

The action off Charles Island was a naval battle fought during the War of 1812 in the summer of 1813 off Charles Island in the Galapagos. An American squadron of three vessels attacked three British armed whalers, and captured them. The engagement was notable for being one of the few to occur in the Pacific Ocean during the war and involved United States Marine Lieutenant John M. Gamble, the first U.S. Marine to command an American warship.

== Background ==
In the War of 1812 between the United Kingdom and the United States, American Captain David Porter, in the thirty-six gun frigate USS Essex, led a fleet of armed vessels in the South Pacific in a commerce raiding operation. At the time of the action, Essex was accompanied by two smaller vessels, recently captured from the British and classified as sloops-of-war by Captain Porter. They were the 10-gun Greenwich of 338 tons burthen and the 8-gun Georgiana of 280 tons burthen. Porter had sent the rest of his fleet to Valparaíso, Chile, to be sold while he and the remaining vessels patrolled for British whalers between Tumbes, Peru and the Galapagos.

Because Porter had entered the Pacific with no more than 350 American servicemen under his command, when he took prizes he could only place small skeleton crews in most of his ships. Georgiana had a complement of forty-two men under Mr. Adams, the Essex's chaplain, and Greenwich held only fourteen men under the command of Lieutenant Gamble, USMC.

== Action ==
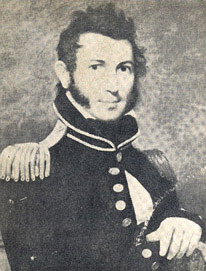
John M. Gamble

There is some confusion as to the date of the battle; in later memoirs, Lieutenant Gamble recalled that it was fought on 12 or 13 July, while Captain Porter's memoir, and letters from Porter to Gamble, stated that it occurred on 14 July. Either way, at about 11:00 AM the Americans were sailing west from Tumbes, Peru, off Banks Bay (Bahia de Bancos) in the Galapagos, when they sighted three sets of sails on the horizon. Commodore Porter signaled his ships to prepare for action and a chase began. At the time, the majority of British ships cruising in the South Pacific were whalers sailing under letters of marque, legally permitting them to act as privateers should the opportunity arise. (Note: All the vessels that Porter captured had crews whose size was more consistent with their being letters of marque than privateers. Vessels intending to engage in privateering had large crews, larger even than those of similarly-sized naval vessels, in order to be able to put prize crews on board their captures, while continuing to hunt for more prey. Porter himself suffered from having too few men to man adequately all his prizes.)

The first British vessel Porter captured was the brig Charlton of ten guns. Charlton was sailing in the center of the three ships, and she surrendered to Essex without a fight as Greenwich and Georgiana went after Seringapatam.

Seringapatam had made several whaling and sealing voyages to the South Atlantic and this area since 1800. She had a 41-man crew under the command of Captain William Stavers and was armed with fourteen 9-pounder guns. On this voyage she captured one American whaler on the way to the whaling grounds.

When escape seemed unlikely, Seringapatam changed course and appeared to be sailing to engage Greenwich. Still, the latter came to a halt and waited for Georgiana to come up and provide assistance. At this point, as four men were transferred from Georgiana to Greenwich, Captain Stavers chose to break off the attack and flee. Lieutenant Gamble closed the distance between the two ships and he first demanded that the British surrender. But when the Americans came within pistol range, Seringapatam raised her colors and fired a powerful broadside.

Greenwich immediately returned fire with small arms and cannon, and for several moments the two vessels exchanged fire. American fire proved to be more accurate, and after taking heavy damage the British struck their colors and Greenwich ceased her firing. Just as Lieutenant Gamble was preparing to board the enemy, Seringapatam attempted another escape. Gamble ordered his men to resume shooting at the sails of the British vessel and eventually brought her to a halt. Meanwhile, Essex had finished pursuing the small 8-gun New Zealander and captured her without difficulty. Captain Porter then assisted in chasing down Seringapatam.

== Aftermath ==
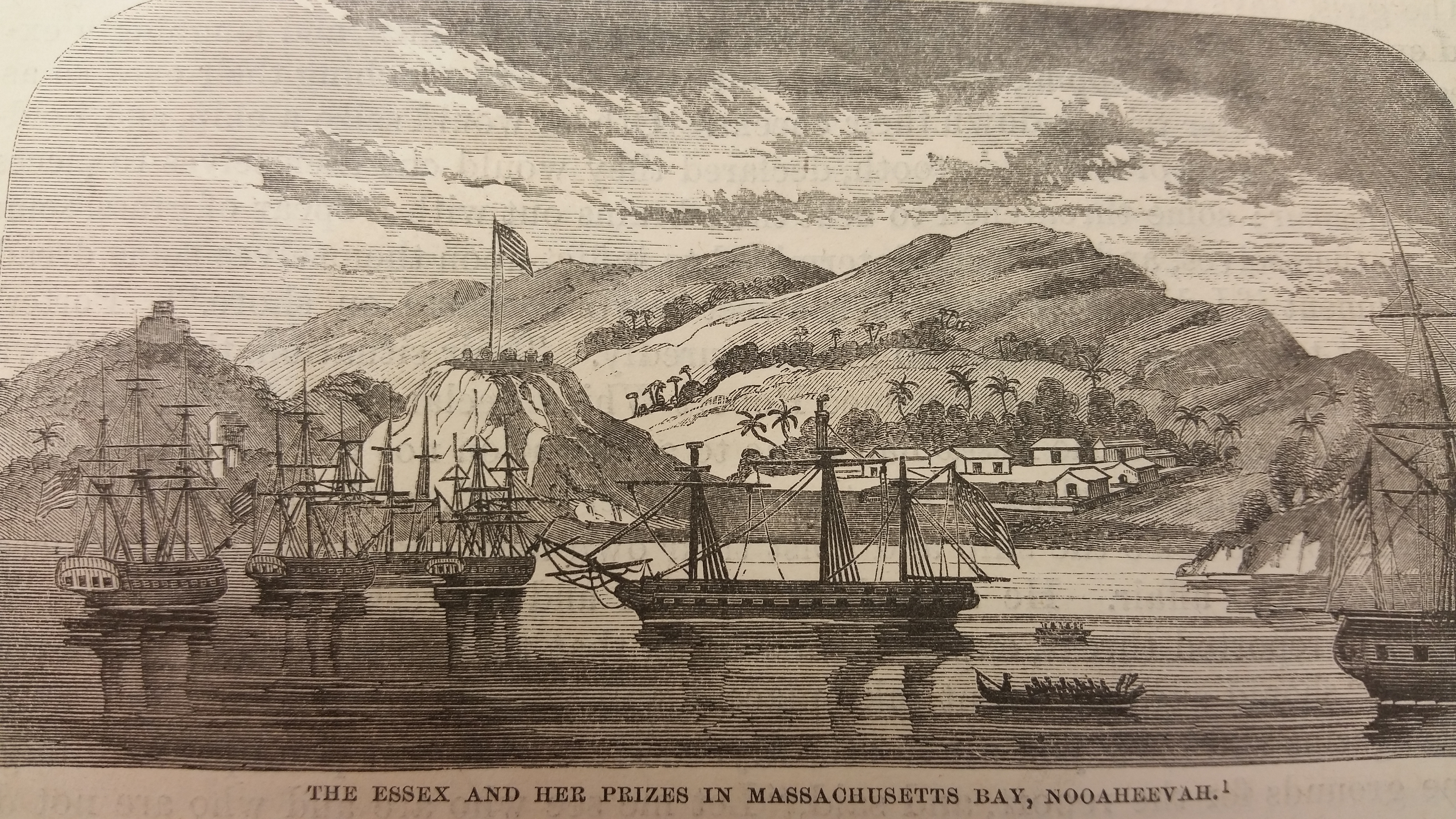
Captain Porter's fleet off Nuku Hiva in October of 1813

American sources make no mention of casualties on either side, though Greenwich sustained some damage and Seringapatam was crippled. Porter took 89 prisoners in all, and the American ships were already filled with captives, so the Americans disarmed Charlton, loaded her with 48 of the prisoners, and sent her to Rio de Janeiro as a cartel with the prisoners under parole with orders to surrender to the first American authority they encountered. Lloyd's List reported that Essex had captured Seringapatam, Stavers, master; New Zealander, Donneman, master; and Charlton, Halcrow, master.

Captain Stavers, when asked to surrender his privateer's commission, revealed that though he had applied for a letter of marque, he had not yet received one, but that it was probably waiting for him in Lima. (Note: One had been issued on 12 December 1812.) Captain Porter announced that Stavers would be taken to the United States and be tried as a pirate, and ordered him and his crew to be put in irons. They were given more freedom after some liberated American whalers told Porter that the British had treated them well during their time as prisoners aboard Seringapatam.

The American press declared Seringapatam to have been a formidable threat to American commerce in the Pacific, making Lieutenant Gamble famous, with the consequence that he received many letters of congratulations from naval officers. Seringapatam was found to have carried up to 30,000 dollars' worth of armaments and provisions. Gamble was promoted to captain and died in 1836 as a lieutenant colonel. However, despite a petition to the U.S. Congress, he never received any prize money for the capture or his subsequent service. Following the engagement, Captain Porter made for Nuku Hiva in the Marquesas where he built America's first base in the Pacific and repaired his ships. He then sailed off, leaving Greenwich, Seringapatam, and another prize, Sir Andrew Hammond, behind. It was after his departure that the Seringapatam Mutiny occurred. The mutineers and British prisoners-of-war recaptured Seringapatam and sailed her to Australia, from where she was returned to her owners. Gamble burned Greenwich before leaving Nuka Hiva in Sir Andrew Hammond.

== See also ==
- Armed merchantmen
