= HMS Briton (1812) =

38-gun fifth-rate frigate of the British Royal Navy's Leda class

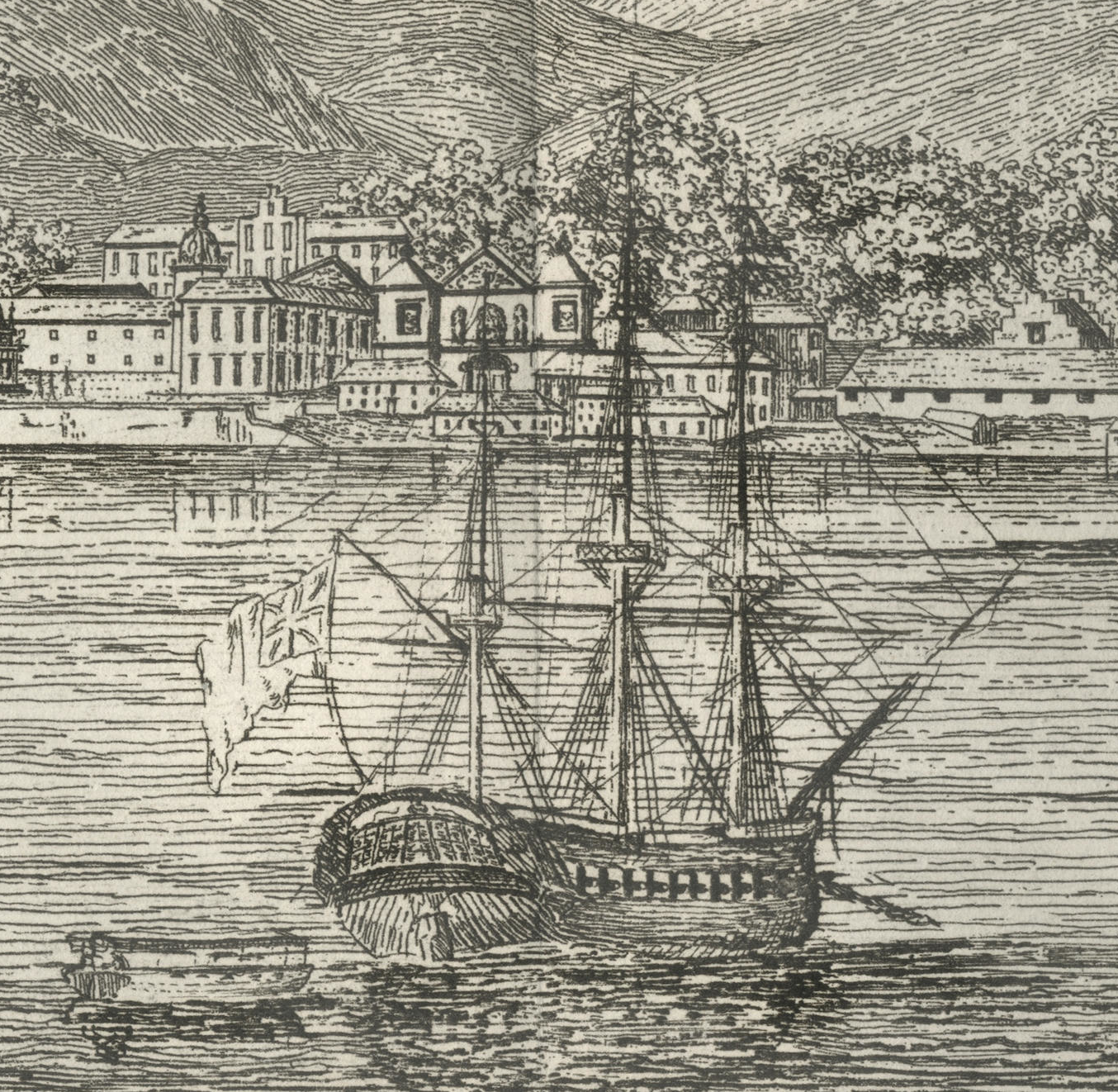
- HMS Briton off Rio de Janeiro

History

United Kingdom
- Name: HMS Briton
- Owner: Royal Navy
- Ordered: 28 September 1808
- Builder: Chatham Dockyard
- Laid down: February 1810
- Launched: 11 April 1812
- Fate: Broken up 18 September 1860

General characteristics
- Class & type: Leda class Fifth-rate 44 gun frigate
- Tons burthen: 1,07981/94 (bm)
- Length: Overall; 149 ft 11 in (45.7 m); Keel: 125 ft 3 3/4 in (38.2 m)
- Beam: 40 ft 3 in (12.3 m)
- Depth of hold: 12 ft 8 1/2 in (3.9 m)
- Propulsion: Sail
- Sail plan: Fully rigged
- Complement: 284
- Armament: Upper deck: 28 × 18-pounder guns.; QD: 8 × 9-pounder guns + 6 × 32-pounder carronades.; Fc: 2 × 9-pounder guns + 2 × 32-pounder carronades.

HMS Briton was a 38-gun fifth-rate frigate of the British Royal Navy's Leda class. She was ordered on 28 September 1808 and her keel laid down at Chatham Dockyard in February 1810. Navy veteran Sir Thomas Staines was appointed her first captain on 7 May 1812 but did not join the ship until 17 June 1813 owing to his being at sea aboard HMS Hamadryad. After a period of cruising in the Bay of Biscay, the vessel set sail for South America where during the course of several missions she unexpectedly encountered the last member of the crew that had seized HMS Bounty from its captain Lieutenant William Bligh during the 1789 mutiny aboard the ship. With the coming of the Pax Britannica in 1815, Briton undertook various voyages before she was broken up in 1860.

== Career ==
=== Prize-taking ===
At the time of HMS Briton's launch, the United Kingdom was at war with the United States and France such that vessels of either country were considered legitimate prizes of war.

As a result, on 1 December 1812 Briton recaptured Wolfe's Cove, which the American privateer Grand Turk had captured a few weeks earlier as Wolfe's Cove was sailing from Quebec to England.

Then on 11 December 1812 Briton, together with the frigate HMS Andromache, took the American brig Leader from Boston bound for Bordeaux, France with a cargo of fish. Then on 10 December they took the French privateer San Souci from St Malo. San Souci of 14 guns, had a crew of 120 men. San Souci arrived at Plymouth on 20 December. Lloyd's List described her as being of 16 guns and having a crew of 70. It further reported that Andromache and Briton had chased Sans Souci for 12 hours before catching her. San Souci had been out six weeks and had captured two British vessels, Speculation, which had been sailing from Cork to Lisbon, and the South Seas whaler Frederick. Sans Souci had only captured Frederick after an hour-long engagement in which Frederick lost her mate killed, and had "Body" and three or four other crew severely wounded. Sans Souci had on board the crew from Frederick. (Note: Sans Souci had been commissioned in October 1812. According to French records, under François Rosse she cruised from October to December 1812, with 100 and 120 men, and four 6-pounders and four 6-pounder carronades.)

On 17 December the two frigates captured the American brig Columbia, loaded with coffee and sugar en route from Philadelphia to Bordeaux, then the brig Stephen carrying cotton, potash and skins from New York to Bordeaux, shortly followed by the brig Exception on 20 December, underway from Philadelphia to Bordeaux loaded with cotton.

In January 1813 Briton and Andromache linked up with HMS Rota and on the 6th the three ships captured the brig Brutus travelling from New York to Bordeaux carrying cotton, coffee and sugar. After her boarding by a prize crew Brutus was not seen again, and it was assumed that she had either been recaptured or had foundered at sea.

On 3 April 1813 HMS Dispatch captured the Prussian vessel Enigheidt. Briton, HMS Belle Poule, and HMS Royalist shared by agreement. Belle Poule also captured the American schooner Napoleon. Belle Poule was in company with Briton and the hired armed cutter Fancy, with Dispatch and Royalist sharing by agreement.

On 3 July Briton captured the 2-gun letter of marque American schooner Joel Barlow, off Bordeaux. She had been sailing from to Charleston to France at the time of her capture. (Note: Briton had to share the proceeds of the capture with the brig HMS Goldfinch, and the privateer Dart. (There were at least three privateers named Dart active around that time and it is not clear which one was involved.) Also, Belle Poule shared by agreement with Briton. Joel Barlow, Buchannon, master, arrived as a prize at Plymouth on 8 July. She was a schooner of 145 tons (bm) and on an earlier cruise, as a privateer of eight guns and 90 men under the command of Captain O. Champlin, had captured one prize.)

After a chase lasting seven hours, on 9 September 1813 Briton captured the fast sailing four-gun French privateer La Melance and her 26 man crew off Bordeaux.

On 13 December, Briton was in sight when the privateer Chance recaptured Watson, and so shared in the salvage money. (Note: There were two privateers named Chance at the time and it is not clear which one was the captor. In any case, a first-class share of the prize money was worth £79 14s 6d; a sixth-class share, that of an ordinary seaman, was worth 12s 11¼d.)

=== Convoy escort and other duties in the Pacific ===
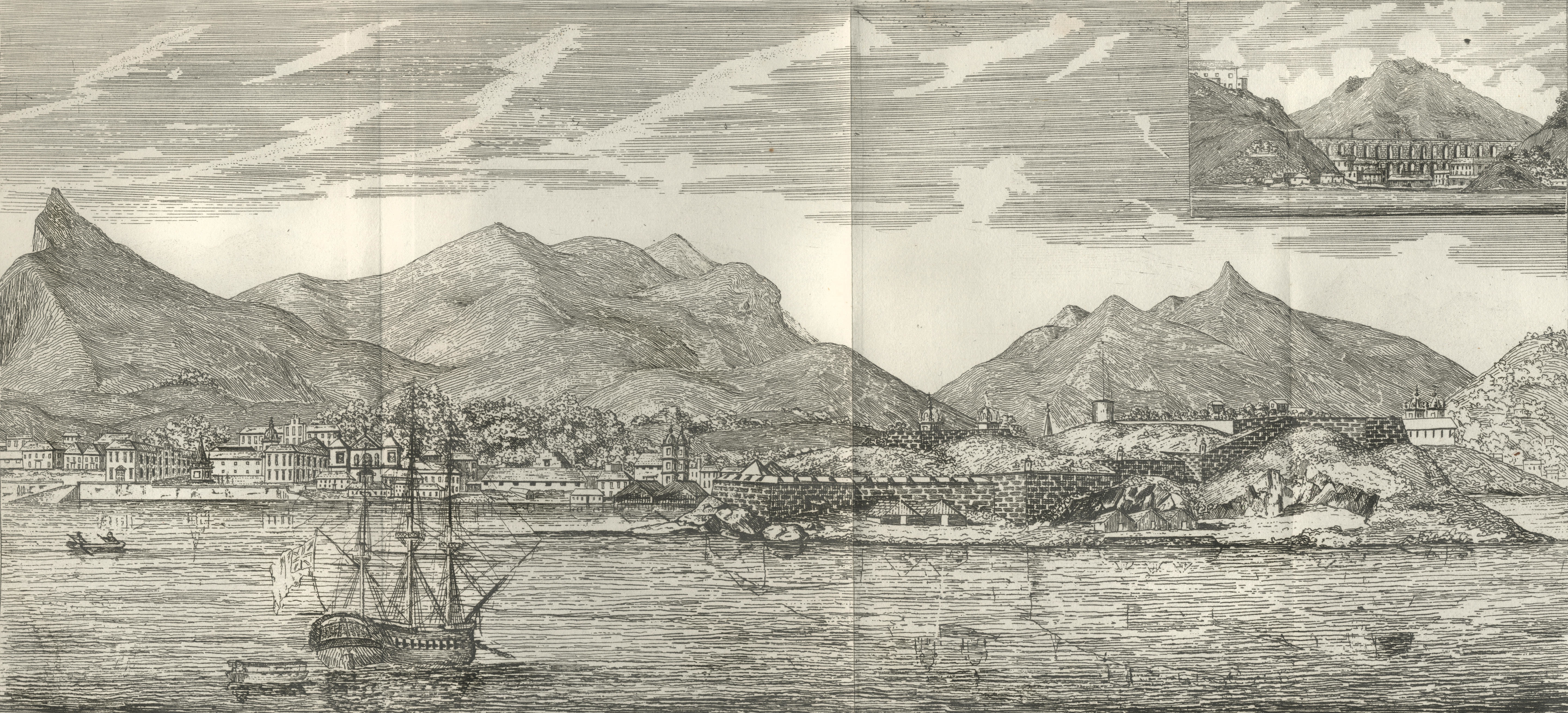
HMS Briton off Rio de Janeiro, March 1814

On 31 December 1813 HMS Briton under the command of Thomas Staines sailed from Spithead off the south coast of England for the East Indies as part of an escort for a convoy of 49 merchant ships. Briton left the flotilla to assist the disabled East Indiaman Fort William and sailed to Funchal on the Portuguese island of Madeira where the merchant vessel underwent necessary repairs. Eight days later the two ships set sail for Rio de Janeiro via Cape Verde, arriving on 20 March 1814.

After docking at Rio, together with HMS Tagus, under the command of Captain Philip Pipon, Briton received orders to proceed to the Pacific around Cape Horn where HMS Phoebe and HMS Cherub were hunting for the American frigate USS Essex, which had attacked British whalers in the area.

When Briton and Tagus arrived in Valparaiso on 21 May, the Phoebe and Cherub had already captured Essex following the Battle of Valparaiso. The four British ships left port on 26 June 1814 arriving at Paita further up the coast of Peru on 2 July. They left the same night and continued northwards close to the shore then anchored near the mouth of the Tumbes River on the border with Ecuador.

"It was on this place a boat belonging to the Phoebe was upset, which occasioned the death of Lieut. Jago, and the Purser, but whether they were drowned or eaten by the Alligators is uncertain. Several of these frightful creatures were seen next morning basking themselves in the sun, and both these gentlemen being good swimmers, one may be led to conclude they reached the shore only to die a more wretched death."

=== Galápagos Islands & Nuku Hiva ===
On finding nearby Isla de la Plata devoid of water, Briton and Tagus headed south to Salango Island where they anchored overnight before setting sail for the Galápagos Islands, arriving at Floreana Island, then known as Charles Island, on 25 July. The following day the two ships visited San Cristóbal Island (then Chatham Island), before proceeding to Santiago Island (then James Island). After a ten-day stay in the Galápagos and a 3,000-mile (4,800 km) journey westward, on 28 August 1814, the flotilla anchored off Nuku Hiva (then called Sir Henry Martyn's Island), one of the Marquesas Islands, which Commodore David Porter of Essex had previously claimed for the United States and renamed Madison Island after the then US President. Porter had built Fort Madison, Nuku Hiva and a villa on the island, which the natives destroyed after his ship left.

Before his departure, Sir Thomas Staines, with the consent of the local tribes excepting the "Typees" from the Tai Pi Valley, took possession of Nuku Hiva of behalf of the British Crown.

=== Pitcairn Islands ===
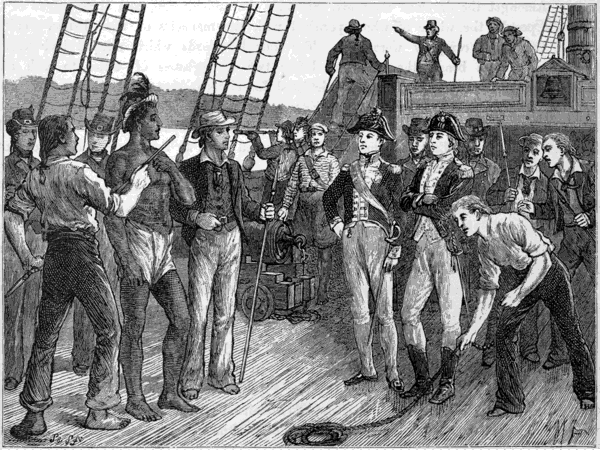
HMS Briton at Pitcairn Island

Nearly three weeks later, on the return journey to Valparaiso, Briton and Tagus made landfall at the then little known island of Pitcairn.

"On the 17th September, 1814, at about half-past two o'clock in the morning, to my surprise and astonishment, land was discovered, both by the Briton and Tagus, and nearly at the same moment. The ships were hove to, and, on hailing the Briton, it was determined to continue in that situation until daylight in the morning, to ascertain the exact position of the land in view, and, according to circumstances, to reconnoitre (sic) it, if necessary. We were then, by our reckoning, in the latitude of about 24° 40' S., and longitude 130° 24' W., the land bearing S.S.E. five or six leagues. As in all the charts in our possession there was no land laid down in or near this longitude, we were extremely puzzled to make out what island it could be, for Pitcairn Island being, according to all accounts, in the longitude of 133° 24' W., we could not possibly imagine so great an error could have crept into our charts with respect to its situation."

— Captain Philip Pipon, HMS Tagus.

Unbeknownst to anyone aboard the two visiting ships, the only surviving mutineer from the Fletcher Christian led 1789 Mutiny on the Bounty, John Adams, remained alive on Pitcairn. Although Mayhew Folger aboard the American trading ship Topaz had paid a brief visit to the island in 1808 and the Admiralty in London were aware of the situation on the island from his subsequent report, neither Staines nor Pipon had been informed.

The Royal Marine Commander aboard Briton, Lieutenant John Shillibeer, wrote in his account of their arrival:

"At this moment I believe neither Captain Bligh of the Bounty, nor Christian, had entered any of our thoughts, and in waiting the approach of the strangers, we prepared to ask them some questions in the language of those people we had so recently left. They came —and for me to picture the wonder which was conspicuous in every countenance, at being hailed in perfect English, what was the name of the ship, and who commanded her, would be impossible—our surprize can alone be conceived. The Captain answered, and now a regular conversation commenced. He requested them to come alongside, and the reply was, " We have no boat hook to hold on by." "I will throw you a rope" said the Captain. "If you do we have nothing to make it fast to" was the answer. However, they at length came on board, exemplifying not the least fear, but their astonishment was unbounded."

The first man from Pitcairn to board Briton soon proved who the islanders were. His name, he said, was Thursday October Christian, the first born on the island and son of Fletcher Christian.

"He was then about twenty-five years of age, a fine young man, about six feet high, his hair deep black, his countenance open and interesting, of a brownish cast, but free from all that mixture of a reddish tint which prevails on the Pacific islands; his only dress was a piece of cloth round his loins, and a straw hat, ornamented with the black feathers of the domestic fowl ... we were glad to trace in his benevolent countenance all the features of an honest English face. I must confess, I could not survey his interesting person without feelings of tenderness and compassion."

From Christian and Adams, the visiting captains received an account of what had transpired since the mutiny, but as they had no instructions to take any action, they returned to Valparaiso, a journey that took about 25 days.

=== Return to the UK and later voyages ===
After three months cruising in the Pacific, on 12 February 1815, Briton and Tagus anchored off the Juan Fernández Islands to take on supplies. Briton remained in the Pacific until the end of April 1815 when she returned to Rio. At this time British merchants in Chile requested that a British warship continue to protect their interests and nominated Sir Thomas Staines as their preferred commander; instead he received orders to return home, arriving at Plymouth on 8 July 1815. Shortly afterwards Briton was put out of commission at Portsmouth as a result of cuts in the Royal Navy following the Battle of Waterloo.

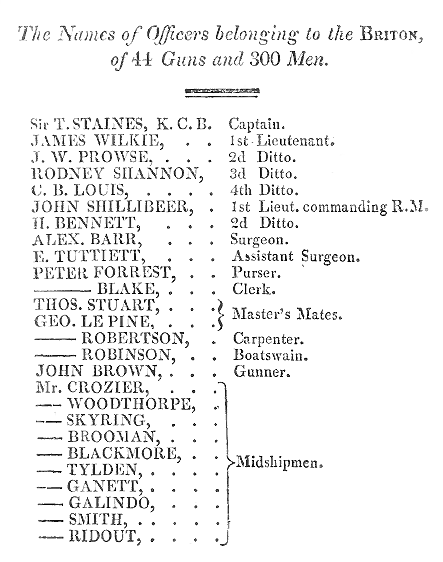
Crew list of HMS Briton c. 1813

In 1829, she transported Sir Henry Chamberlain, 1st Baronet to Portugal to take up his appointment as consul general.

On 10 August 1829, Briton left Portsmouth under the command of Capt. Hon. W. Gordon and returned to the same port on 13 August, departing again the following day. According to the Charleston Courier, on 2 June 1831 a bottle found off the coast of Florida at 25°52′N 80°9′W contained a note that read as follows:

"Current Bottle, No. 37. —This bottle has been thrown overboard, to determine the current, by Mr. W. H. Hale, of H.M.S. Briton. Whoever finds it, is requested to give intelligence of the same, in writing, to Mr. Harrison, the editor of the Hampshire Telegraph, at Portsmouth. —H.M.S. Briton, Captain the Hon. W. Gordon, Gulf of Mexico, 2nd February, 1830, from Tampico to England, in lat. 27° 50', lon. 84° 40'. Tortugas S. 18°, E. 230 miles."

== Fate ==
Briton served as a convict ship from 1841 onwards. She became a target ship in February 1860. Breaking up was completed at Portsmouth on 18 September 1860.

== Legacy ==
Along with Tagus, Briton featured on the 1988 15c postage stamp issued by the Pitcairn Island Post Office.
In November 2009, a log book from Briton sold at auction for £40,842.50.
