= HMS Phoebe (1795) =

Frigate of the Royal Navy

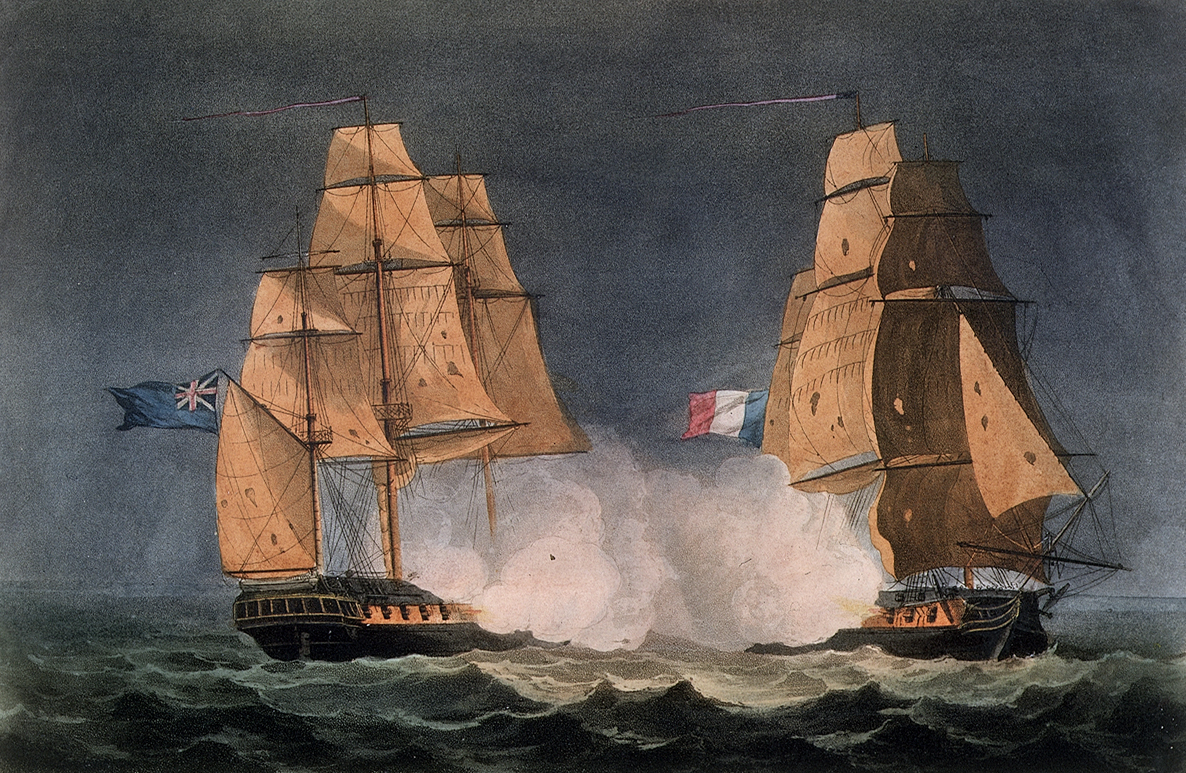
- Capture of Néréide by Phoebe on 20 December 1797; Thomas Whitcombe, 1816

History

Great Britain
- Name: HMS Phoebe
- Ordered: 24 May 1794
- Builder: John Dudman, Deptford Wharf
- Laid down: June 1794
- Launched: 24 September 1795
- Honours and awards: Naval General Service Medal with clasps; "Phoebe 21 Decr. 1797"; "Phoebe 19 Feby. 1801"; "Trafalgar"; "Off Tamatave 20 May 1811"; "Java"; "Phoebe 28 March 1814"
- Fate: Sold 1841

General characteristics
- Class & type: Phoebe-class frigate
- Type: 36-gun 18-pounder fifth rate
- Tons burthen: 9268/94 (bm)
- Length: 142 ft 9 in (43.5 m) (overall); 139 ft 0 in (42.4 m) (keel)
- Beam: 38 ft 3 in (11.7 m)
- Depth of hold: 15 ft 5 1/2 in (4.7 m)
- Propulsion: Sails
- Sail plan: Ship rigged
- Speed: 13 knots (24 km/h; 15 mph)
- Complement: 264
- Armament: Upper deck: 26 × 18-pounder guns; QD: 8 × 9-pounder guns + 6 × 32-pounder carronades; Fc: 2 × 9-pounder guns + 4 × 32-pounder carronades

HMS Phoebe was a 36-gun fifth rate of the Royal Navy. She had a career of almost twenty years and fought in the French Revolutionary Wars, the Napoleonic Wars and the War of 1812. Overall, her crews were awarded six clasps to the Naval General Service Medals, with two taking place in the French Revolutionary Wars, three during the Napoleonic Wars and the sixth in the War of 1812. Three of the clasps carried the name Phoebe. During her career, Phoebe sailed to the Mediterranean and Baltic seas, the Indian Ocean, South East Asia, North and South America.

Once peace finally arrived, Phoebe was laid up, though she spent a few years as a slop ship during the 1820s. She was then hulked. The Admiralty finally sold her for breaking up in 1841.

== Construction ==
She was one of four frigates that the Admiralty ordered on 24 May 1794 to a design by Sir John Henslow, Surveyor of the Navy, to be a faster version of the 1781 Perseverance-class frigates. The contract for the first ship was placed with the Thames-side yard of John Dudman, where the keel was laid in June 1794. She was named Phoebe on 26 February 1795 and was launched on 24 September 1795 at Deptford Wharf on the Thames. She then moved to Deptford Dockyard, where she was completed on 23 December.

== French Revolutionary Wars ==
Phoebe was first commissioned in October 1795 under Captain Robert Barlow, (Note: One of Barlow's officers was Samuel Pechell, the future Rear-Admiral and Lord of the Admiralty. Pechell served aboard Phoebe for four years and participated in the capture of both Néréide and Africaine.) for the Irish coast and Edward Pellew's squadron. On 10 January 1797, after an eight-hour chase, she captured the 16-gun Atalante, under the command of Lieutenant Dordelin, off the Isles of Scilly. Atalante had a crew of 112 men. She was a three-year-old brig with a coppered hull and an 80-foot (24 m) keel. The Royal Navy took her into service under her existing name.

In 1797 Phoebe was off Brest as part of an inshore squadron of frigates under Sir Edward Pellew in Indefatigable. The squadron included Amazon, Révolutionnaire and the hired armed lugger Duke of York.

On 22 December 1797 Phoebe captured the French 36-gun Néréide, Captain Antoine Canon. Phoebe sighted the Néréide at 10am; the pursuit started at 11:30am and ended at 10:45pm with Néréide's surrender. During the chase Néréide fired her stern guns at Phoebe and the two vessels exchanged broadsides shortly before the Néréide surrendered. Phoebe lost three men killed and 10 wounded; Néréide lost 20 men killed and 55 wounded. Part of the reason for the disparity in casualties was that the ratio of the weight of the broadsides was 407 pounds (185 kg) to 268 pounds (122 kg). In 1847, the Admiralty awarded the Naval General Service Medal with clasp "Phoebe 21 Decr. 1797" to all remaining members of her crew who had participated in the action.

On 11 October 1799, Phoebe captured the French privateer Grand Ferrailleur. Grand Ferrailleur was armed with sixteen brass 6-pounder guns and had a crew of 121 men. She was 16 days from Bordeaux but had not taken any prizes.

On 21 February 1800, Phoebe captured the French privateer Bellegarde (or Belle Garde) of Saint-Malo. Bellegarde carried 14 guns and a crew of 114 men. She had been out 16 days and had captured Chance, of London and sailing from Martinique, and the brig Friends, of Dartmouth, sailing from St. Michael's to Bristol. Later, on 24 February, Kangaroo recaptured Chance. (Note: Baalgade (mistakenly spelled "Bellegarde" in some documents), was a 166-ton ("of load") privateer from Saint-Malo commissioned in February 1798. Her first cruise, under a Captain P. Kerpoisson with 69 men, occurred from February 1799. She made another cruise from November. Captain F. Leconte sailed her on third cruise from March 1800 with 115 men and 14 guns.)

=== Heureux ===
On 5 March, Phoebe captured the privateer Heureux in the English Channel off Bordeaux. Heureux had intended to cruise the West Indies. Instead, she arrived at Plymouth on 25 March.

Heureux, of 22 long brass 12-pounders and 220 men, mistook Phoebe for an East Indiaman, and approached her. Heureux did not discover her mistake until she had arrived within point-blank musket-shot. Heureux fired on Phoebe in an "Act of Temerity to be regretted". Her hope was that well-directed fire would disable Phoebe's masts, rigging, and sails, and thereby enable Heureux to escape. Phoebe returned fire and Heureux was forced to strike her colours. Phoebe had three seamen killed or mortally wounded, and three slightly wounded. Heureux had 18 men killed and 25 wounded, most of whom lost limbs. She had been out 42 days but had captured only a small Portuguese sloop that the wind had pushed out to sea while the sloop was sailing from Limerick to Galway with a cargo of wine.

Barlow described Heureux as "the most complete flush Deck Ship I have ever seen, coppered, Copper fastened, highly finished and of large Dimensions... The Accounts given of her Sailing are very extraordinary; she will be considered as a most desirable Ship for His Majesty's Service." The British took her into service as Heureux.

=== Africaine ===
On 19 February 1801, about six miles (9.7 km) east of Gibraltar, Phoebe sighted a French ship off Ceuta, also sailing eastwards. Barlow chased the French vessel for two-and-a-half hours before he could bring her to a close action. After about two hours the French vessel struck her colours; she had five feet (1.5 m) of water in her hold and was almost a wreck. Phoebe's fire had dismounted her guns and left her decks strewn with hundreds of casualties.

She proved to be Africaine, of twenty-six 18-pounders and eighteen 9-pounders; she had sailed from Rochefort on the 13th. She was under the command of Capitaine Majendie and she flew the broad pennant of Commandant de Division Saunier. She had a crew of 315 men, but also was ferrying 400 troops under General Desfourneaux to reinforce the French invasion force in Egypt.

The French reported that they had suffered 200 killed in the action, including Saunier, the Chef de Brigade and two army captains, and 143 wounded, the later including Desfourneaux and Majendie, who was wounded in two places. The heavy casualties were the result of French troops crowding the upper deck despite their small arms fire contributing little or nothing in the dark to her defense. The troops had refused shelter below deck on the basis of mistaken valour.

Phoebe lost one man killed, and 12 men wounded. Her masts, sails and rigging were badly damaged but she was able to limp to Port Mahon. Weak winds resulted in the voyage, in company with Africaine, taking two weeks. The British took Africaine into service under her existing name.

Barlow received a knighthood. Phoebe's first lieutenant, John Wentworth Holland, who had been wounded, received a promotion to commander. In 1847 the action earned Phoebe's crew the clasp "Phoebe 19 Feby. 1801" to the Naval General Service Medal (1847). Captain Thomas Baker subsequently took command of Phoebe in May 1801.

== Napoleonic Wars ==
In June 1802 Capt. James Shephard took command. Captain The Hon. Thomas Bladen Capell followed him and recommissioned Phoebe in September. She then sailed for the Mediterranean on 28 September.

In 1803 Phoebe was sailing out of Malta. At some point, perhaps during the summer, her boats participated in a disastrous attack on two French privateers off Civitavecchia. The privateers repulsed the British, who lost eight men killed and wounded. On 1 August, Phoebe captured two settées, which a French squadron recaptured. In recapturing the settees, the French squadron involved lost an opportunity to capture Phoebe, though they did capture the schooner Redbridge and a transport.

Hindostan arrived at Gibraltar in March 1804 and then sailed from there to join Admiral Nelson off Toulon in company with Phoebe, but the vessels became separated during a gale in the Gulf of Lyons. Shortly thereafter Hindostan caught fire and was totally destroyed. (Note: All but three of the 259 people on board were saved.)

On 13 June Phoebe and Amazon made ready to engage two French frigates anchored under the guns of the north-most fort at Toulon. The fort fired at Phoebe, but she was out of range. When the French fleet sortied, the British vessels rejoined their squadron, however the French fleet returned to port without engaging.

On 24 August 1804 Phoebe and Childers captured Venscab.

On 10 November Phoebe captured Cacciatore. Then Phoebe and Hydra shared the proceeds from the capture between 9 and 15 November of the vessels Paulina and Sesostris. (Note: A first-class share of the prize money for Cacciatore was worth £233 8s 8d; a fifth-class share, that of a seaman, was worth 19s 11d. A first-class share of the prize money for Paulina and Sesostris was worth £591 4s 6d; a fifth-class share was worth £2 7s 4d. In addition, there were 28 supernumeraries aboard Phoebe or Hydra who were entitled to a fifth-class for Paulina only. Each supernumerary received £1 3s 2d.)

HMS Victory was passing the island of Toro (off Mallorca; 39.462307°N 2.471722°E) on 4 April 1805 when Phoebe brought the news that the French fleet under Admiral Pierre-Charles Villeneuve had escaped from Toulon. While Nelson made for Sicily to see if the French were heading for Egypt, Villeneuve entered Cádiz to link up with the Spanish fleet.

Then, while Nelson was pursuing the French fleet from Toulon to the West Indies, Capel, in Phoebe, was in charge of a small squadron of five frigates and two bomb vessels with the mission of covering Sicily, Sardinia and the route to Egypt. Phoebe joined the blockade of Cádiz later in the summer.

=== Trafalgar ===
The arrival of the additional frigates Phoebe, Naiad, Sirius, Juno, and Niger off Cádiz allowed Nelson to detach them to disrupt local shipping supplying provisions for the Franco-Spanish Combined Fleet in Cádiz.

In October, the frigate squadron was acting as the eyes of the British fleet. When the Combined Fleet put to sea on 19 October, Phoebe was first in line, followed by Naiad and the third-rate Defence. Capel spotted the Combined Fleet's exit and notified Nelson. As the combined fleet approached the British over the next couple of days, the frigates shadowed it, reporting on its movements.

During the subsequent Battle of Trafalgar, Phoebe relayed Nelson's signals to the rest of fleet, and remained close to the action although she did not actually engage the enemy. In the gale that followed a few days later Donegal and Phoebe assisted two of the prizes, Swiftsure and Bahama, with the result that they were saved. (Note: In later life, Cappel would sit on the committee that would issue the Naval General Service Medal, one of the clasps of which read "Trafalgar".)

=== North Sea and Baltic ===
In January 1806 Captain James Oswald took command. Phoebe then served in the North Sea and the Channel. On 9 July Phoebe, Thames and Amfitrite were deployed to the Shetland Islands to find a French squadron reported to be destroying British and Russian fishing and merchant vessels in the Arctic. Although Phoebe met with no success, Blanche encountered and captured Guerriere. Phoebe then sailed to the West Indies.

On 18 January 1808, Phoebe sailed for the Mediterranean. In April 1809 Captain Hassard Stackpoole took command for the Baltic. Between 7 and 12 July, Phoebe captured the Russian vessels Saint Nicholas 1 and Saint Nicholas 2, and another vessel, name unknown. In August Captain James Hillyar replaced Stackpoole. On 6 January 1810 Phoebe sailed from Torbay for off the Île de Batz. Later she was in the Gulf of Livonia where her boats took numerous prizes.

Between March and July 1810 Phoebe underwent repairs at Plymouth. She then sailed for the East Indies on 18 July.

=== Indian Ocean ===
By 21 November Phoebe was off the island of Rodrigues preparing for a joint naval and military expedition to take the Île de France. The expedition arrived on 28 November and the French signed the capitulation on 3 December. (Note: A first-class share was worth £278 19s 5 3/4d; a sixth-class share, that of an ordinary seaman, was worth £3 7s 6 1/4d. A fourth and final payment was made in July 1828. A first-class share was worth £29 19s 5 1/4d; a sixth-class share was worth 8s 2 1/2d.)

In March 1811, Phoebe survived two major hurricanes in the Indian Ocean. Phoebe the participated in the Battle of Tamatave, where she fought another Néréide, under Captain Jean-François Lemaresquier. In the severe action the British captured Renommée; Néréide surrendered subsequently on the 25th at Tamatave. The British took both vessels into service, Néréide as Madagascar and Renommée as Java. Phoebe suffered seven dead and 24 wounded. Néréide suffered some 130 men dead and wounded. In 1847 this battle earned Phoebe's surviving crew the clasp "Off Tamatave 20 May 1811" to the Naval General Service Medal.

=== Java ===
On 3 August 1811, Phoebe joined the fleet involved in the invasion of Java. Lieutenant-general Sir Samuel Auchmuty was the military commander-in-chief, and Commodore William Robert Broughton of the 74-gun third rate Illustrious was the naval commander-in-chief. Later, Rear-Admiral Robert Stopford took charge of the naval forces.

On 31 August Stopford detached the frigates Nisus, President, and Phoebe, and the sloop Hesper to take Cheribon, a seaport about 35 leagues (170 km) east of Batavia. They arrived at dark on 3 September and the fort surrendered the next morning without a shot being fired.

On 11 September, all squadron re-embarked the seamen and marines that had landed, together with about 700 prisoners, including 237 Europeans. At 4am Nisus and Phoebe weighed and steered for Taggal, a port about 20 or 25 leagues (97 or 121 km) further to the east. The next day Phoebe arrived off the harbour. Together with a landing party of seamen, marines, and some sepoys, Captain Hillyar took quiet possession of the fort and public stores.

Phoebe, Nisus, President, and Harpy joined Stopford with Scipion and Lion on 14 September. The next day they sailed for Surabaya. On 17 September they anchored off Ledayo on the Java shore where three transports with 450 men joined them. There they learned that the Dutch and French had surrendered the day before. The troops landed two days later and took possession of the place on 20 September under the general terms of the capitulation.

In 1847 the Admiralty authorized the issuance of the Naval General Service Medal with clasp "Java" to all remaining survivors of the campaign. Phoebe arrived at Plymouth Dock on 18 January 1812 with dispatches from the East Indies.

== War of 1812 ==
On 9 April 1812 Phoebe sailed with a convoy for Quebec. She returned to Deal on 2 August. On 30 September she was in Plymouth, having brought dispatches from Halifax. She then underwent a refit.

In late December 1812, Phoebe captured two American schooners. One was the Vengeance, an American letter of marquee 12-gun schooner from New York, bound to Bordeaux, laden with sugar and coffee. Vengeance arrived in Plymouth on 8 January. The Royal Navy took Vengeance into service as Telegraph. Vengeance was closely followed by Hunter, a privateer schooner, of 14 guns and 100 men. The capture of Hunter occurred on 23 December after a chase during which she threw 12 of her guns overboard. Earlier, Hunter had captured a transport and a brig from a convoy under the escort of hired armed cutter Nimrod.

A few days later, Phoebe was sailing off the Azores in the company of the 74-gun third rate HMS Elephant, under the command of Francis Austen, the brother of the acclaimed novelist Jane Austen, together with Hermes (1811). On 27 December they captured the American privateer schooner Swordfish of Gloucester, John Evans, master. Swordfish was 16 days out of Boston and had a crew of 82 men, and originally twelve 6-pounder guns. However, she had thrown 10 overboard during the chase, which took 11 hours and covered more than 100 miles.

On 18 March 1813 Phoebe left Portsmouth with a convoy for Brazil and the East Indies. On 6 July Phoebe, the sloop-of-war Cherub, and Racoon sailed from Rio de Janeiro around Cape Horn to the Juan Fernández Islands. There, Racoon continued on to the fur trading outpost of Fort Astoria. Phoebe and Cherub remained to search for the 36-gun USS Essex. Hillyar was under orders to capture the Essex "at all costs".

=== USS Essex ===
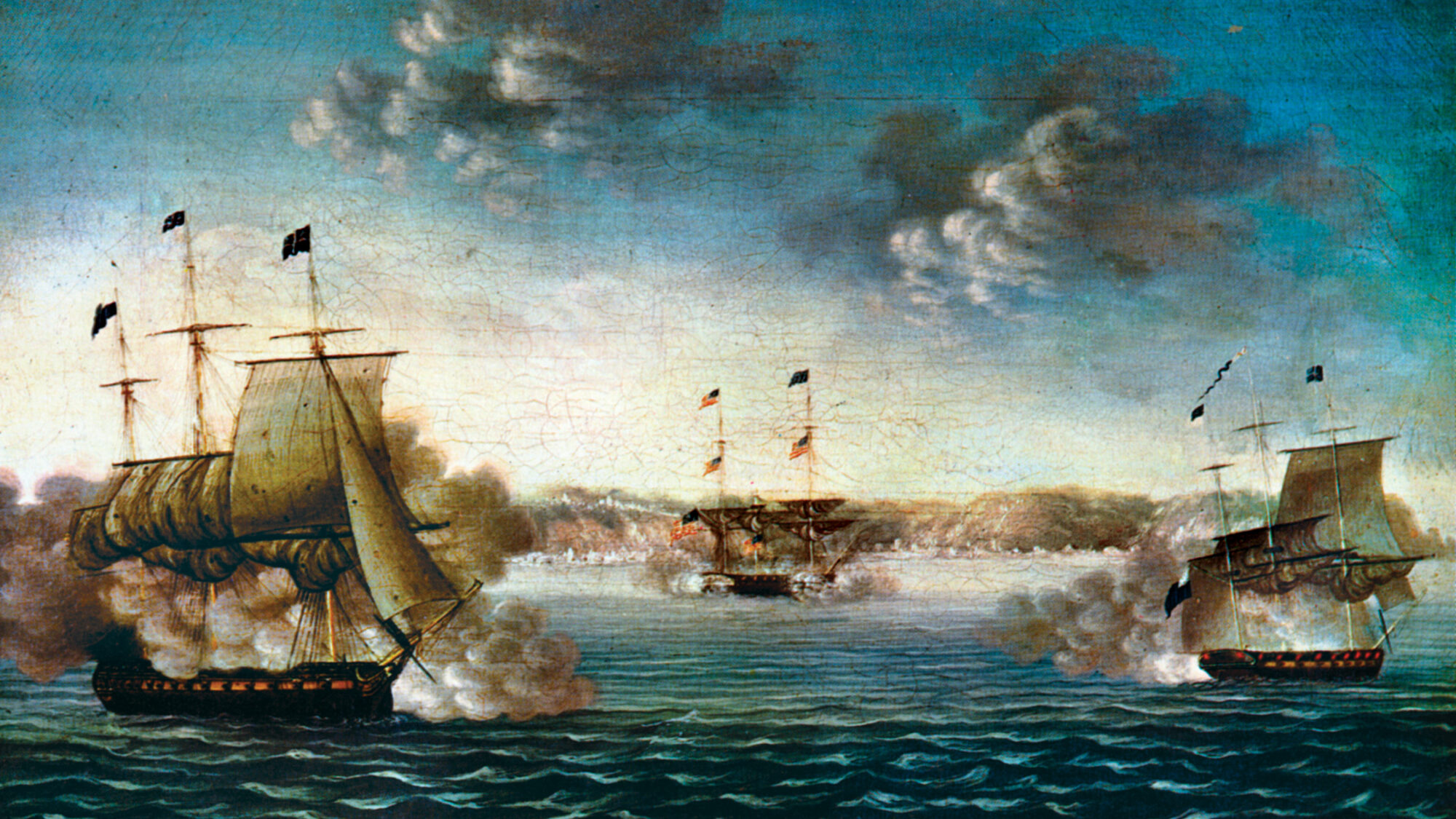
c. 1819 painting of Pheobe (left) at the Battle of Valparaíso

On 8 February 1814 Phoebe and Cherub arrived at Valparaíso, a neutral port, where Essex and her prizes were anchored. Having trapped Essex in the harbour, Hillyar waited six weeks for her to come out and thwarted all of the efforts of her captain, David Porter, to escape. Eventually, on 28 March, Porter attempted to break out of the harbour. A squall took off his main topmast and he attempted to return to harbour but Phoebe and Cherub drove Essex into a nearby bay and defeated her in a short engagement. Phoebe and Cherub also captured Essex's tender, Essex Junior, the ex-British whaler Atlantic.

In the engagement with Essex, Phoebe had four men killed, including her first lieutenant, and seven men wounded. Cherub had one killed and three wounded, including her captain. The British reported that Essex had 24 killed and 45 wounded, though the Americans reported higher casualties. In 1847 the then surviving crew members of Phoebe and Cherub were awarded the Naval General Service Medal with clasps "Phoebe 28 March 1814" and "Cherub 28 March 1814".

On 31 May Phoebe and Essex set sail for England, with Lieutenant Pearson of Phoebe commanding the prize crew on Essex. On the way they stopped for some time in Rio de Janeiro. The two ships finally anchored in Plymouth sound on 13 November. The Admiralty promoted Pearson to commander, and repaired Essex, taking her into service as HMS Essex. (Note: A first-class share of a portion of the prize money for Essex was worth £619 17s; a sixth-class share, that of an ordinary seaman, was worth £7 13s 6d. The second distribution occurred on 24 October 1815 for which the value of a first-class share was worth £299 2s 9d; a sixth-class share was worth £3 2s. A first-class share of the final distribution was worth £153 6s 6d; a sixth-class share was worth £3 2s.)

On 19 June, Cherub recaptured Sir Andrew Hammond near the Sandwich Islands. Sir Andrew Hammond was a whaler that Porter had captured and left at Nuka Hiva, together with other captured vessels, including the Greenwich and the former British letter-of-marque whaler, USS Seringapatam, the whole being under the command of Lieutenant John M. Gamble USMC. When Gamble made preparations to leave the island, many of his party mutinied. Gamble and seven men (four unfit for duty) escaped and sailed Sir Andrew Hammond 2,000 miles (3,200 km) before they had the misfortune to meet up with Cherub. (Note: A first-class share of the salvage money was worth £72 13s 5d; a sixth-class share, that of an ordinary seaman, was worth 16s 6d. Cherub shared the money with Phoebe by prior agreement.)

== Fate ==
Phoebe was paid off in 1814 and laid up at Plymouth in August 1815. Between January 1823 and October 1826 she was a receiving ship and slop ship. She became a hulk in 1826 at Plymouth. Phoebe was sold for breaking up to Joshua Crystall for £1,750 on 25 May 1841.
