= Charlton (1803 ship) =

History

United Kingdom
- Name: Charlton
- Owner: 1803:Mather & Co.; 1811:Archibald McNeilage et al.
- Launched: Unknown
- Fate: Last listed 1818

General characteristics
- Tons burthen: 270, or 274, or 276 (bm)
- Complement: 1803:23; 1813:21 (at capture)
- Armament: 1803:10 × 12&6-pounder cannons; 1811:10 × 12-pounder carronades
- Notes: Constructed of pine and locust

Charlton (or Charleton), was built in America. She first appeared in British-origin online records in 1803. She made three complete voyages as a whaler. She was on her fourth voyage when the U.S. Navy captured her. After her captors released her she returned to England and then disappears from easily accessible online records.

== Career ==
1st whaling voyage (1803–1806): Captain Samuel Chace acquired a letter of marque on 17 November 1803. Captain Samuel Chase sailed from London on 29 December 1803, bound for Timor. Charlton returned to London on 17 June 1806 with 1300 barrels of sperm oil. She had undergone repairs in 1803 and 1804.

2nd whaling voyage (1806–1808): Captain Paul West sailed from London on 13 August 1806, bound for the Pacific Ocean Later that year she was reported off Cape Horn, and in mid-1807 she was off Brazil. Charlton returned on 13 June 1808.

3rd whaling voyage (1808–1810): Captain Thomas Folger sailed from London on 4 September 1809 for Peru. Charlton returned to London on 13 November 1810 with 1350 barrels of whale oil. (Note: Thomas Folger was a native of Nantucket. Prior to being captain on Charlton, Folger had been master of Vulture and Griffin (1807–1809). After being master of Charlton, Folger became captain of Catharine and Rambler (1816–1817).)

The Register of Shipping for 1811 showed Charlton's master changing from (O.) Folgar to Haleron, and her owner from Mather to M'Nelage. It also showed that she had undergone a good repair in 1811 and that her copper sheathing had been repaired.

4th whaling voyage (1811–1814); capture and release: Captain Sinclair Halcrow sailed from London on 11 October 1811, bound for the Galapagos.

Captain David Porter, in the thirty-six gun frigate USS Essex, captured Charlton in the action off Charles Island in mid-July 1813. Porter and his squadron of captured British whalers sailing under the American flag also captured Seringapatam and New Zealander.

The Americans disarmed Charlton, loaded her with 48 of the prisoners, and sent her to Rio de Janeiro as a cartel with the prisoners under parole with orders to surrender to the first American authority they encountered. Lloyd's List reported that Essex had captured Seringapatam, Stavers, master; New Zealander, Donneman, master; and Charlton, Halcrow, master.

On 6 February 1814 Charlton sailed from Rio for London. She was in the Channel by 23 May, and Gravesend by 30 May. She returned to London on 3 June.

== Fate ==
Although the Register of Shipping continued to carry Charlton to 1818, she does not appear in Lloyd's List's ship arrivals and departures data.
