= Fort Madison (disambiguation) =

Fort Madison, Iowa is a city in Iowa that grew up around the War of 1812 Fort Madison.

Fort Madison may also refer to:

- Fort Madison (Alabama), a stockade fort used during the Creek War
- Fort Madison, Nuku Hiva, the first United States naval base in the Pacific Ocean
