= Wolfe's Cove (1812 ship) =

UK merchant ship 1812–1819

History

United Kingdom
- Name: Wolfe's Cove
- Namesake: Wolfe's Cove
- Owner: 1813:Risdale & Co.; 1814:C. Waltham & Co.
- Builder: Baldwin & Co.
- Laid down: Ile d'Orleans, Quebec
- Launched: 10 August 1812
- Fate: Damaged 1819 and hulked

General characteristics
- Tons burthen: 356, or 35622/94, or 363 (bm)
- Complement: 20 (at capture)
- Armament: 2 × 4-pounder guns

Wolfe's Cove (or Wolf's Cove) was built by Baldwin & Co and launched in 1812 at Ile d'Orleans near Quebec. She sailed to England and from there first traded with Canada and then from 1816 with Mauritius, India, and Java. An American privateer captured her in 1813, but the Royal Navy recaptured her within weeks. She was damaged and hulked at Mauritius in 1819.

== Career ==
Wolfe's Cove sailed to England and entered Lloyd's Register in 1813 with T. Kirby, master, changing to J. Cobb, Redsedle & Hamilton, owners, and trade London–Liverpool, changing to Liverpool–Quebec. The Register of Shipping for 1814 had her master changing from J. Kirby to S. Stephenson, her owner from Risdale & Co. to C. Waltham, and her trade from Liverpool–Quebec to Liverpool–Halifax, Nova Scotia.

Wolf's Cove, William Compleman (or Campleman), master, was on her way from Quebec to England when on 16 November 1813 the American privateer Grand Turk captured her at 42°30′N 8°37′W. American records state that Wolfe's Cove had two guns and 20 men. Her captor valued her at $60,000, put a prize crew aboard her, and sent her for New Orleans.

Grand Turk was on her third cruise and this was her fifth prize. Wolfe Cove's cargo included 38 bales of fine furs (invoiced at £12,000), and 500 tons of oak and pine timber, spars, staves, and the like (invoiced at £3,000). The weather was too rough to permit the removal of the furs. Captain Breed took off her crew and put a prize crew of 19 men on Wolfe's Cove, under the command of Robert Cloutman.

On 1 December 1813 HMS Briton recaptured Wolf's Cove, which arrived at Scilly on 10 December. At the time a number of other British naval vessels were in sight and so shared in the salvage money for Wolf's Cove. (Note: A first-class share of the salvage money was worth £65 6s 3d; a sixth-class share, that of an ordinary seaman, was worth 6s 11¼d.)

On 24 March 1815 as Wolfe's Cove was going down the Thames River on her way to Halifax, Nova Scotia and Saint John, New Brunswick, she grounded and fell on her side at George's Stairs, Deptford. The next tide refloated her. She was hauled to the King's Moorings, Deptford, and there was surveyed. The survey revealed that she had sustained no damage and she resumed her voyage.

In 1814 the British East India Company (EIC) lost its monopoly on the trade between Britain and India. A number of ship owners then commenced trading east of the Cape of Good Hope under licenses from the EIC. Wolfe Cove's's owners applied on 30 November 1814 for a licence, which they received the same day.

In 1816 Wolfe's Cove's trade changed from London−Halifax to London–Île de France. She also had some damages repaired that year.

Wolfe's Cove appeared on a list of licensed ships as having sailed for Bombay on 26 February 1816 under the command of Captain Stephenson.

She again appears as having sailed to Bombay 31 March 1817 under the command of Captain C. M'Gregor. This information may not be entirely correct as Wolf's Cove, Stephenson. master, was reported to have been at 21°30′N 69°30′E on 16 April 1817 while on her way back to England from Bengal.

On 25 April 1818 Wolfe's Cove, Stephenson, master, sailed for Île de France.

== Loss ==
When a violent gale hit Mauritius on 24 January 1819, Wolfe's Cove was driven on shore at Île aux Tonneliers. She had come from Java and as a result of being driven on shore the great part of her cargo was damaged. Wolfe's Cove was refloated but her masts and cargo were removed and she was sold as a hulk.
