= Griffin (1807 ship) =

History

United Kingdom
- Name: Griffin
- Owner: Folger
- Launched: Spain
- Acquired: 1807 by purchase of a prize
- Fate: Last mentioned at Rio de Janeiro in 1809

General characteristics
- Tons burthen: 90 (bm)
- Sail plan: Brig
- Armament: 2 × 6-pounder + 6 × 12-pounder carronades

Griffin was a Spanish prize, that between 1807 and 1809 made one voyage as a whaler to the British southern whale fishery.

Griffin first appeared in Lloyd's Register (LR) in 1807 with Folger master and owner, and trade London-South Seas. She was mentioned in 1807 in the Protection List, which protected seamen serving on her from impressment on the outbound leg of a voyage.

Captain Thomas Folger sailed from Deal on 29 December 1807 for the southern whale fishery. (Note: Thomas Folger was a native of Nantucket. Prior to being captain on Griffin, Folger had been master of Vulture (1804–1807).) Griffin immediately ran into difficulties. On 1 December 1807 Lloyd's List reported that Griffin, Folger, master, had run onshore at the Sand Head, near Portsmouth, while sailing from London for the South Seas. On 15 December Griffin, Folger, master, sailed from Cowes for the South Seas.

On 13 May 1809 Griffin, Folger, master, arrived at Rio de Janeiro from the South Seas.

However, a few weeks earlier, on 20 April, Three Brothers, Long, master, had arrived at Rio from the Cape of Good Hope. Three Brothers, Folger, master, arrived at Liverpool on 9 September. Although there is a slight discrepancy in dates, Thomas Folger sailed Charlton from London on 4 September 1809 for Peru. All of this would suggest that Thomas Folger had sold Griffin and her cargo in Rio de Janeiro and then returned to England.

Lloyd's Register and the Register of Shipping continued to carry Griffin, Folger, master, to 1813 and 1811, respictively, but with stale data; they both showed her last survey as being in 1807. (Note: After being captain on Griffin, Folger became master of several whalers: Charlton (1809–1810), Catharine (1811–1812), and Rambler (1816–1819).)
