= Governor Dowdeswell (1800 ship) =

History

Spain or France
- Launched: 1798
- Captured: c.1800

Great Britain
- Name: Governor Dowdeswell
- Namesake: Governor Dowdeswell of the Bahamas (1798–1802)
- Acquired: 1800 (by purchase?)
- Captured: May 1813

General characteristics
- Tons burthen: 229, or 306, or 322 (bm)
- Complement: 1800:35; 1803:45; 1806:35; 1808:22; 1811:30
- Armament: 1800:20 × 6-pounder guns; 1803:20 × 6-pounder guns; 1806:20 × 6-pounder guns; 1808:14 × 6&9-pounder guns; 1811:14 × 6&9-pounder guns

Governor Dowdeswell (or Governor Dowdswell, or Governor Dodswell) was launched in 1798 in Spain or France under another name. The British captured her in 1800. New owners in Liverpool renamed her and employed her as a slave ship for five voyages in the triangular trade in enslaved people. With the end of the British slave trade in 1807, new owners employed her as a whaler. She made one complete whaling voyage to the Pacific but the Spanish seized he during her second whaling voyage there.

== Slave ship ==
Governor Dowdeswell first appeared in Lloyd's Register in 1800 with R. Kelsall, master, Ward, owner, and trade Liverpool–Africa. It describes her as a Spanish prize built 1798. Later entries in the registers gave her origins as France. She proceeded to make five enslaving voyages.

1st enslaving voyage (1800–1802): Captain Richard Kelsall acquired a letter of marque on 30 October 1800. General Dowdeswell sailed from Liverpool on 6 December 1800. She acquired captives at Bassa. Kelsall died on 23 June 1801, and Captain William Brinton replaced him. She arrived on 26 September 1801 at Demerara. She left on 12 January 1802, but on her way ran ashore at Bootle Bay, in the Bahamas. She arrived at Liverpool on 21 March. She had left Liverpool with 49 crew members and suffered seven crew deaths on her voyage.

2nd enslaving voyage (1802–1803): Captain John Neal sailed from Liverpool on 21 May 1802. General Dowdeswell acquired captives at Malembo and arrived at the Bahamas on 19 December 1802. There she landed 335 captives. She sailed on to Havana and may have landed captives there too. She left for Liverpool on 24 March 1803, and arrived there on 2 May. She had left Liverpool with 37 crew members and suffered two crew deaths on her voyage.

3rd enslaving voyage (1803–1804): Captain Edward Williams acquired a letter of marque on 26 July 1803. He sailed from Liverpool on 15 August. General Dowdeswell acquired captives at New Calabar and Bonny. She arrived at Charleston on 10 February 1804 and landed 329 captives there. She sailed from Charleston on 20 May and arrived at Liverpool on 19 June. She had left with 45 crew members and suffered two crew deaths on her voyage.

4th enslaving voyage (1806): Captain John Young acquired a letter of marque on 19 February 1806. He sailed from Liverpool on 23 April 1806. General Dowdeswell acquired captives at the Congo River. She arrived at Charleston on 19 September, where she landed 306 captives. She sailed from Charleston on 18 October and arrived back at Liverpool on 22 November. She left Liverpool with 42 crew members and suffered two crew deaths on her voyage.

5th enslaving voyage (1806): Captain Young sailed from Liverpool on 1 April 1807. General Dowdeswell acquired captives at Calabar and delivered them to Kingston, Jamaica. She arrived there on 3 October and landed 246 captives. She sailed for Liverpool on 14 December and arrived back there on 31 January 1808. She had left with 41 crew members and suffered nine crew deaths on her voyage.

The Slave Trade Act 1807 banned the slave trade by British subjects. General Dowdeswell's last voyage started while the slave trade was legal but the Act forbade any further slave trading voyages. No longer able to engage in slaving, her owners sold her.

== Whaler ==
Lloyd's Register in 1808 gave the name of Governor Dodswell's master as W. Trotter. It gave the name of her owners simply as "London", and her voyage as Liverpool–London. Eleven lines lower, the same issue gave the name of her master as R. Cleveland, her owner as Crosbie & Co., and her trade as London–South Seas. It also reported that she had undergone a thorough repair in 1809.

Captain Reuben Cleveland acquired a letter of marque on 8 October 1808. He sailed from England on 16 October 1808, bound for Peru. Governor Dodswell returned to England on 15 February 1811 with more than 800 barrels of sperm oil.

== Fate ==
Captain Barnabus Gardner acquired a letter of marque on 3 June 1811. Gardner sailed on 21 June 1811.

Lloyd's List reported on 25 May 1813 that an American privateer was reported to have captured Gov. Dodswell, a South Sea whaler, Gardner, master, near the Galapagos Islands. Some weeks later Lloyd's List corrected the report, stating that it was the Spanish that had captured Governor Dowdeswell, and that the capture took place off Valparaiso. This would have had to occur in late 1812 or early 1813 if reports were to reach London by May–June 1813.

Another report has the privateer Javiera (aka Nuestra Señora de Iciar), Captain José Gandaria, capturing her in May 1813. Javiera was patrolling for vessels bringing supplies to the Chilean rebels. Javiera captured Governor Dowdeswell in May off Valparaiso, and then on 24–25 May Javiera captured Sir Andrew Hammond, another British whaler. Javiera took Sir Andrew Hammond to Callao where a court released her as she was not carrying contraband. It is not clear what happened to Governor Dowdeswell.

The entries in Lloyd's Register for Governor Dowdeswell from 1814 to 1816 note that she was captured. She was last listed in 1816.
