= Sir Andrew Hammond (1800 ship) =

History

Great Britain
- Name: Sir Andrew Hammond
- Namesake: Sir Andrew Hamond, 1st Baronet
- Owner: 1800:Sheedan (or Sheddan); 1812:Mellish & Co.; 1834:T. Ward
- Builder: Bermuda
- Launched: 1800
- Fate: Wrecked 1841
- Notes: Built of Bermuda cedar and yellow pine

General characteristics
- Tons burthen: 282, or 301, or 302 (bm)
- Complement: 30
- Armament: 1800:2 × 9-pounder guns + 8 × 12-pounder guns "of the New Construction"; 1803:14 × 12&18-pounder cannons; 1803:2 × 6-pounder guns + 12 × 12-pounder carronades

Sir Andrew Hammond (or Sir Andrew Hamond) was launched at Bermuda in 1800. She spent almost a dozen years as a West Indiaman. From 1812 on she was a whaler. On her first whaling voyage she sailed to the Pacific where the United States Navy captured her. She then served briefly in the United States Navy before the British Royal Navy recaptured her. She returned to whaling and made a further eight whaling voyages. She was lost in 1841 on her tenth whaling voyage.

== West Indiaman ==
Sir Andrew Hammond first appeared in Lloyd's Register in 1800 with Thompson, master, R. Sheedan, owner, and trade London–Jamaica.

Captain James McDonald acquired a letter of marque on 19 September 1803. Her owner was still R. Shedden, and her trade London–Jamaica.

In 1806 Sir Andrew Hammond was under the command of J. Barr.

== Whaler ==
The Register of Shipping for 1813 showed Sir Andrew Hammond with Porter, master, Mellish, owner, and trade London–South Seas.

=== 1st whaling voyage (1812–1815) ===
Captain William Porter sailed from London on 9 December 1812, bound for Peru. By 6 February 1813 Sir Andrew Hammond was at Rio de Janeiro, on her way to Peru. she had had to put in there as she had sprung her mainmast.

==== Capture by Spain ====
Sir Andrew Hammond was off Valparaiso on the night of 24–25 May when she encountered the Spanish privateer Javiera (aka Nuestra Señora de Iciar), Captain José Gandaria. Javiera was cruising, looking for vessels smuggling contraband to the Chilean revolutionaries. Although Sir Andrew Hammond had a letter of marque, Captain Porter was drunk and attempted to escape, leading Javiera to set out in pursuit. Javiera captured Sir Andrew Hammond and in mid-June they arrived at Callao. During the transit the prize crew vandalized Sir Andrew Hammond. (Some months earlier Javiera had detained Governor Dowdeswell on similar grounds.)

At Callao the Naval Court ruled that Porter's attempt to flee justified the detention. However, as he had the correct paperwork and there was no evidence of contraband, the court ordered the release of Sir Andrew Hammond. It further ordered Javiera to pay 500 pesos for the damage the prize crew had inflicted, and court costs.

==== USS Sir Andrew Hammond ====
USS Essex, Captain David Porter, captured Sir Andrew Hammond on 13 September 1813 off the Galapagos. Porter appointed his Chaplain, David P. Adams, as prize master.

On 2 October, Sir Andrew Hammond was one of the prizes that Porter selected to accompany Essex to Nuku Hiva Island in the Marquesas for rest and refit. Lloyd's List reported on 8 July 1814 that Essex had captured Sir Andrew Hammond and taken her to the Marquesas.

Prior to sailing from Nuku Hiva for the coast of South America, Porter moved Seringapatam, Sir Andrew Hammond, New Zealander, and Greenwich under the guns of the fort that he had erected on the island. He placed the entire force under the command of Lt. John M. Gamble, USMC. Soon after Porter's departure, the local inhabitants started pilfering from the Americans, finally forcing Gamble to land a detachment of men to restore order.

Gamble consolidated the whale oil from all four prizes in New Zealander and sent her for the United States. On 21 April 1814, HMS Belvidera recaptured New Zealander and sent her into Halifax, Nova Scotia. New Zealander was carrying 1950 barrels of sperm oil when she was recaptured.

In April 1814, Gamble began to rig Seringapatam and Sir Andrew Hammond with the intention of leaving the island. When signs of mutiny appeared among his crews-largely made up of men who had been captured from British whalers-he had all the arms and ammunition put on board Greenwich. But, in spite of his precautions, the mutineers captured Seringapatam on 7 May, and Lt. Gamble was wounded in the fight. (The mutineers consisted of men who had originally served on Greenwich and Sir Andrew Hammond.) They sailed her to Port Jackson, after repelling a second attack by Gamble and his men.

Gamble was eventually able to get Sir Andrew Hammond to sea although his entire party at that time consisted of eight men, only four of whom were fit for duty. Before they left Nuku Hiva they burned Greenwich. Gamble sailed Sir Andrew Hammond 2,000 miles to the Sandwich (Hawaiian) Islands. When she arrived at Honolulu on 23 or 25 May she was the first warship under the American flag to enter the harbour there.

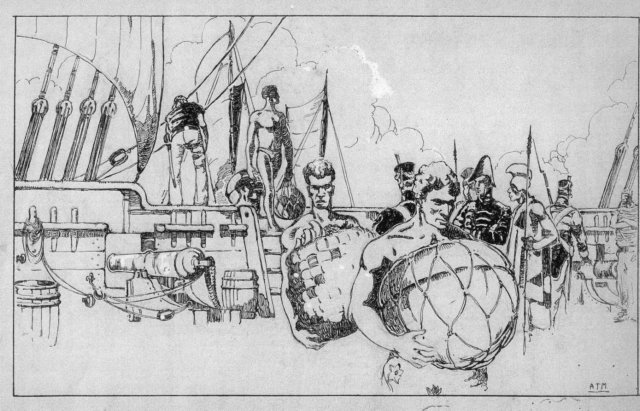
USS Sir Andrew Hammond at Honolulu, 1814

Gamble augmented his crew in Hawai'i with some American seamen and some Hawai'ians. He then set sail on 11 June for the island of Hawai'i. HMS Cherub recaptured Sir Andrew Hammond on 12 June and Charon five days later. (Note: A first-class share of the salvage money for the two vessels was worth £72 13s 5d; a sixth-class share, that of an ordinary seaman, was worth 16s 6d. Cherub shared the money with HMS Phoebe by prior agreement.)

Lloyd's List reported on 14 March 1815 that Sir Andrew Hammond had arrived at Rio after her recapture.

=== 2nd whaling voyage (1816-1818) ===
Captain Abraham Bristow sailed from London in 1816, bound for Timor. Sir Andrew Hammond returned to London on 28 May 1818 with 590 casks of whale oil.

=== 3rd whaling voyage (1818–1820) ===
Captain Hales (or Henry Heslar), sailed from London in 1818, bound for the Galapagos Islands. Sir Andrew Hammond returned to London on 19 July 1820.

=== 4th whaling voyage (1820–1823) ===
Captain Richard Crust (or Cruit), sailed from London in 1820. Sir Andrew Hammond returned to London on 15 June 1823 with 380 casks of whale oil.

=== 5th whaling voyage (1823–1826) ===
Captain Richard Cust sailed from London on 29 August 1823, bound for the Brazil banks. She did, however, also sail to Tahiti. Sir Andrew Hammond returned to London on 23 June 1826 with 470 casks of whale oil.

=== 6th whaling voyage (1826–1828) ===
Captain Allen sailed from London in 1826, bound for Peru. Sir Andrew Hammond returned to London on 4 September 1828 with 480 casks (1800 barrels) of whale oil.

=== 7th whaling voyage (1828–1831) ===
Captain Hammer sailed from London on 12 December 1828, bound for Peru. Sir Andrew Hammond returned to London on 15 March 1831.

=== 8th whaling voyage (1831–1834) ===
Captain Cuthell (or Cuthill, or Cullet), sailed from London on 17 May 1831, bound for the waters off Japan. The vessel was at the Bay of Islands, New Zealand, in December 1832. And at Honolulu by 7 November 1833 with 1,400 barrels of sperm whale oil. Sir Andrew Hammond returned to London on 12 June 1834 with some 1800 barrels of whale oil.

=== 9th whaling voyage (1834–1837) ===
By this voyage the ownership of Sir Andrew Hammond had changed to T. Ward. Captain Davis sailed from London on 21 September 1834. At some point her master became R. Cury. She returned to London on 1 December 1834 with 380 casks of whale oil (137 tons oil).

== Fate ==
Captain Robert Newby sailed Sir Andrew Hammond on her 10th whaling voyage. She sailed from London 22 May 1838, bound for Peru. She visited the Bay of Islands and Fiji. She arrived Sydney 25 December 1839 with 500 barrels of oil and departed 12 December 1840. The vessel ran aground on a sand bank a few miles off the coast of Ecuador on 28 August 1841. She had 700 barrels of oil aboard, of which 400 were saved; 300 were lost. Her crew was saved.
