= Tai Pī (province) =

Coordinates: 8°52′23.11″S 140°3′39.54″W

Tai Pī is a province of Nuku Hiva, in the Marquesas Islands, an administrative subdivision of French Polynesia. The settlement follows the line of the valley and the stream that passes from its mountainous island surroundings.

Herman Melville (known as 'Tommo' in Melville's narrative) was famously marooned here when, as a young whaling ship sailor, he deserted ship with his shipmate, Toby Greene. This experience which lasted a total of four weeks was the subject of Herman Melville's first book Typee: A Peep at Polynesian Life. He arrived the day the French sailed into Nuku Hiva and began firing their cannon, thus proclaiming it a French Protectorate.

Melville's story thus represents the tribe's (and all the Nuku Hiva islanders') native way of life before their island's opening-up to the outside world and the suppression that would follow. Their lifestyle, surroundings & condition made the young Melville think he had stumbled into the Garden of Eden. He portrays their daily life as joyful, nonchalant and innocent, and strikingly free of the worries of the Western World. Man makes a living by simply foraging in the abundant tropical surroundings, and teaches his son himself, within the community. There is almost no difference between the possessions of the islanders, and their homes are erected by everybody and not entirely fixed-abodes. This way of life was to rapidly decline and change with the arrival of the Europeans, as explored in Melville's second book, Omoo (although Omoo has nothing to do with Tai Pī).

== History ==
=== Nuku Hiva Campaign ===
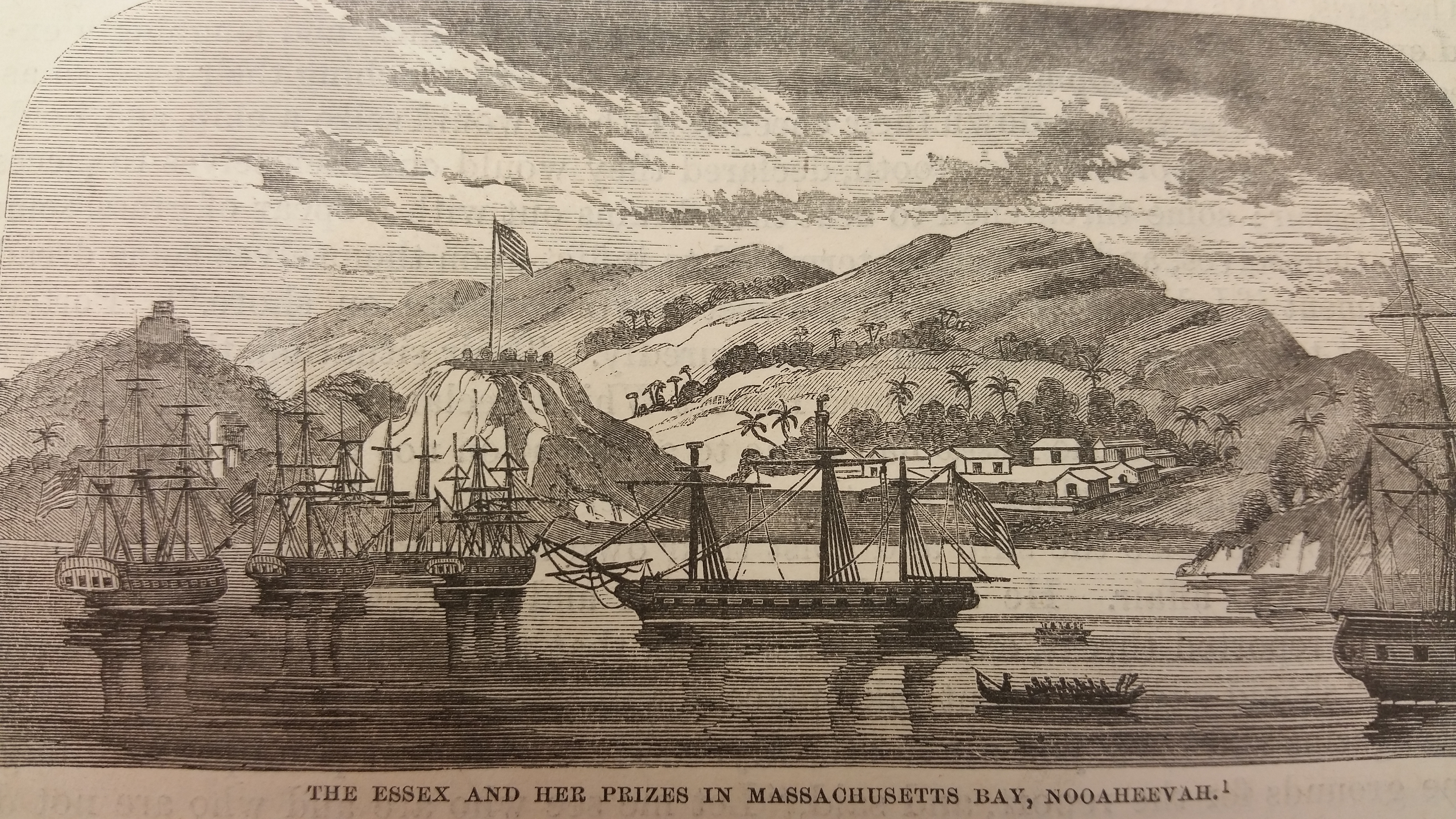
The American fleet at Nuka Hiva in 1813.

During the wars between the Te I'i and the Tai Pī in 1813, the American navy Captain David Porter arrived in the frigate USS Essex and ten other armed ships on October 25. A shore party was landed and they claimed the island for the United States and constructed a small village, named Madisonville. A fort and a dock was also built, the latter to refit the Essex. Almost immediately Porter became involved in the tribal conflict. The first expedition into the jungle was led by Lieutenant John Downes. He and forty others captured a fort held by 3,000 to 4,000 Happah warriors with the assistance of several hundred Te I'is. The victory forced the Happah to terms and they allied themselves with both the Americans and the Te I'i. A second expedition was led by Porter himself, during which he made an amphibious assault against the Tai Pī-held coastline. 5,000 Te I'is and Happahs accompanied the fleet in at least 200 war-canoes. Though the landing was unopposed, Porter's force of thirty men and a cannon led the march inland where they found another, more formidable, enemy fort. Thousands of natives armed with rocks and spears, positioned in a formidable mountain fortress, were able to fend off their enemies. The victory was short-lived, however, and Captain Porter followed up his landing with an expedition overland, bypassing the fort, to threaten the Tai Pī's village center in "Typee Valley," as the Americans named it.

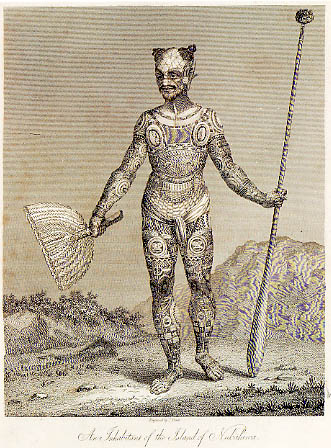
A Nuku Hiva warrior with a spear and a hand fan by Wilhelm Gottlieb Tilesius von Tilenau, 1813.

The column arrived at their destination on November 30, 1813. The first shots fired occurred after the Tai Pī attempted to ambush the column. The attack was beaten off and Porter issued a message warning that if the Tai Pī did not cease their resistance at once, he would destroy their villages. After a little while of waiting, the hostiles seemed to ignore the demands so the expedition advanced. An engagement ensued as the villages were burned. In the end, the Americans and their Te I'i and Happah allies had won at severe cost to the enemy, who sued for peace soon after. The next few months were peaceful until May 1814. The War of 1812 between the United States and the United Kingdom was in its third year. Most of the American fleet was captured British privateers. At least six British prisoners were at Nuku Hiva during the American operations against the natives, not including a number who volunteered to fight for Captain Porter. But in December 1813, Porter left Nuku Hiva to continue raiding British whalers. He left behind only nineteen navy sailors and six prisoners under two midshipmen and Marine Lieutenant John M. Gamble. On May 7, 1814, a group of the British sailors mutinied, released the six prisoners, and attacked the fort. Gamble was wounded in the foot and taken captive with his remaining men on the corvette Seringapatam, though the Americans were set adrift later that day.

An Englishman, named Wilson, on the island was used as an interpreter by Porter, and on May 9 he convinced the Te I'i that Porter would not return, which the natives were not happy about. Wilson eventually persuaded the Te I'is to cancel the alliance and attack. Six American sailors were on the beach at Madisonville when the Te I'is attacked, Four of the men were killed and one other man escaped wounded with a second survivor. Gamble was alone on the Sir Andrew Hammond, one of the captured British ships. While still recovering from his wound to the foot, two Te I'i war-canoes attacked the ship. The ship's cannon were already loaded so Lieutenant Gamble stumbled from one gun to another, firing them as fast as he could. Ultimately Gamble beat off the enemy attack single-handedly though after the deaths of four of his men in town, there was no choice but to abandon the colony with the remaining seven, all of whom were either wounded or ill. After that the base was never again occupied by American forces. Captain Porter, who intended to sail back to Nuku Hiva, was captured at the Battle of Valparaiso on March 28.
