= Thomas Staines =

Royal Navy officer (1776–1830)

Captain Sir Thomas Staines KCB (1776 – 13 July 1830) was an officer in the Royal Navy.

== French Revolutionary Wars ==
Staines joined Peterel on 3 July 1796 on his promotion to Lieutenant. Commander Philip Wodehouse had taken command of Peterel by December 1796, when Peterel landed a small party under Lieutenant Thomas Staines on the coast of Corsica. The landing party attacked a Martello tower, which they captured, and threw its gun, a long 32-pounder, over the cliff.

Peterel's next captain was Commander William Proby, Lord Proby, who took over in March 1797. In June 1797, Wodehouse authorised Staines to take 20 men in two of the ship's boats to cut out a French privateer that had been preying on merchant vessels off the coast of Tuscany. After a skirmish in which the British had five men wounded and the French lost several dead and wounded, the British took the privateer, which had a crew of 45 men and was armed with two long guns and several swivels.

In September 1798, Commander Henry Digby sailed Peterel from Gibraltar to Faro, Portugal, to deliver despatches from Earl St. Vincent for the Lisbon packet. Staines took the six men in Peterel's jolly boat to deliver the despatches to the packet when the jolly boat overturned in heavy seas. Four men drowned, and Staines and the sixth man were only rescued after four hours.

Peterel participated in the Capture of Menorca (1798) by the British expedition under Commodore John Duckworth. On 12 November 1798 the Spanish 40-gun frigate Flora, in company with the 40-gun Proserpina and the 34-gun ships Pomona and Casilda, captured Peterel whilst she was operating off Menorca. One of the Spanish ships fired a broadside after she surrendered. After removing the prisoners from the ship, the Spanish plundered their clothes and possessions, murdering a seaman who attempted to defend his property. Duckworth detached Argo to pursue the sloop and on 13 November she retook Peterel and her 72-man Spanish prize crew, which was under the command of Don Antonio Franco Gandrada, Second Captain of Flora. Captain James Bowen of Argo put his own prize crew of 46 officers seamen and marines aboard Peterel. Duckworth later appointed his first lieutenant, George Jones, to command Peterel. Most of the clothes belonging to Captain Long and his officers, including Staines, were subsequently recovered. This charge of ill-usage was officially contradicted in the Madrid Gazette of 12 April, but was, nevertheless, essentially true.

The Spanish squadron, already being chased the next day by several British ships, completely outsailed their pursuers and returned to Cartagena with the prisoners. After a detention of 14 days at Cartagena, Lieutenant Staines and his fellow prisoners were embarked in a merchant brig bound to Málaga; but they did not arrive there until 24 December, a westerly wind having obliged the vessel to anchor off Almeria, where she was detained upwards of three weeks, and her passengers confined on shore during that period. From Málaga, the British were marched to Gibraltar, under a strong escort of soldiers, who treated both officers and men with great brutality, but particularly Lieutenant Staines, who had received a sabre wound in the wrist whilst parrying a blow which one of those soldiers had aimed at his head. On their arrival at the rock, a court-martial was assembled to investigate the circumstances attending their capture by the Spanish squadron; and as no blame could be attached to any individual, the whole of them were sent back to the Peterel immediately after their acquittal.

Captain George Long fell at Elba and on 3 February 1799 Francis Austen, the brother of author Jane Austen and future admiral of the fleet, took command of Peterel. Peterel and Austen shared in the proceeds of the capture on 18 June 1799 of the French frigates Courageuse, Alceste, and Junon, and the brigs Alerte and Salamine. Thereafter, Peterel captured or cut out from ports an armed galley, a transport brig carrying cannons and ammunition, and some twenty merchant vessels. Staines frequently commanded the cutting out expeditions.

== Napoleonic Wars ==
In May 1802 Staines assumed command of HMS Cameleon in the Mediterranean. He sailed her back to Britain where she was paid off in September 1805.

From March 1807 through November 1809, Staines was captain of HMS Cyane. It was his service on Cyane, particularly at Naples between 25 and 27 June 1809, which cost him his arm, that led to his knighthood and the Order of Saint Ferdinand.

On 17 September 1814 HMS Briton under his command, along with HMS Tagus, were the first British ships to visit the Pitcairn Islands after the Bounty and discover the fate of the mutineers – this was six and half years after the American ship Topaz rediscovered Pitcairn. However, Staines was unaware of that discovery.

== Honours ==
Staines was knighted in three orders: as a Knight Commander of the Bath, Knight Commander of the Sicilian Order of St. Ferdinand and Merit, and a Knight of the Ottoman Order of the Crescent.
