= Seringapatam (1799 ship) =

India-built British and American ship

History

Great Britain
- Name: Seringapatam
- Namesake: Siege of Seringapatam (1799)
- Owner: P. Mellish & Co.
- Builder: Bombay Dockyard
- Launched: 23 July 1799
- Fate: Captured July 1813

United States
- Name: USS Seringapatam
- Acquired: July 1813 (by capture)
- Fate: Taken by mutineers and prisoners of war in May 1814

United Kingdom
- Name: Seringapatam
- Owner: 1815: Mellish & Co.; 1833: Creighton, or Chrichton; 1850-1869: Various
- Acquired: Seized by mutineers and prisoners of war in May 1814
- Fate: No longer listed in 1870

General characteristics
- Type: Ship
- Tons burthen: 336, or 357 or 25732/94, (bm)
- Complement: 1800: 25; 1804: 40; 1806: 30; 1810: 30; 1843: 32
- Armament: 1800: 14 × 9- & 18-pounder guns; 1804: 16 × 6&9-pounder guns + 4 × swivel guns; 1806: 0 × 6-pounder guns + 4 × 18-pounder carronades + 4 × swivels; 1810: 14 × 9-pounder guns + 6 × swivels; US service: 22 cannon
- Notes: Teak-built

Seringapatam was built in 1799, of teak, as a warship for Tippu Sultan, the ruler of Mysore. However, the British stormed his citadel at Seringapatam that year and he was killed in the action. The vessel was sailed to England in the hopes that the Admiralty would buy it. The Admiralty did not, and British merchants bought her to use as a whaler. She made six voyages to the Southern Atlantic and the Pacific until 1813, on her sixth voyage, when during the War of 1812, a US frigate captured her. She served briefly as a tender to the frigate before mutineers and British prisoners recaptured her and sailed to Australia. After her return to her owners, she returned to whaling until 1846, making another nine voyages. She then sailed between London and New South Wales until 1850. In the 1850s and 1860s she sailed to Aden and Hamburg, ending her years trading between Shields and Quebec. She is no longer listed in 1870.

== Whaler ==
Seringapatam appeared in Lloyd's Register in 1800 as "East Indian" with W. Day, master, P. Mellish, owner, and trade London–Southern Fisheries. She was described as having been built in Bombay in 1799. She also appeared in the same issue as Seringapatam.

Year	Master	Owner	Trade	Source
1800	W.Day	Mellish & Co.	London–South Seas	LR

Seringapatam was admitted to the Registry of Great Britain on 16 April 1800.

=== Whaling voyage #1 (1800–1801) ===
Between 1800 and 1814 or so, Seringapatam made six voyages as a whaler.

Captain William Allam (or Allen) Day acquired a letter of marque on 22 April 1800. He sailed for the Galapagos Islands that year.

Lloyd's List reported in January 1801 that Seringapatam had been at Rio de Janeiro, having sailed in company with several ships of the East India Company. She was one of the vessels in the convoy at the action of 4 August 1800, when HMS Belliqueux and the East Indiaman Exeter captured the French frigates Concorde and Médée.

Seringapatam returned to England on 18 December 1801.

=== Whaling voyage #2 (1802–1804) ===
Captain David Joy sailed from England on 28 March 1802. War with France had just ended and Captain Joy did not acquire a letter of marque.

Georgiana spoke with Seringapatam at the Galapagos on 26 August 1802. She was reported to still be there in April 1803. She returned to England on 17 May 1804.

=== Whaling voyage #3 (1804–1806) ===
War with France had resumed in 1803 and Captain John Bird acquired a letter of marque on 7 August 1804. He sailed from England on 28 August, bound for the Isle of Desolation. Seringapatam was reported to be there "all well" on 25 February 1805. She was part of a flotilla of eight vessels on a sealing voyage.

On 31 January 1806 she was at St Helena. She returned to England on 15 April.

=== Whaling voyage #4 (1806–1809) ===
Captain Edward Clark, of Nantucket, acquired a letter of marque on 28 May 1806. He sailed from England on 23 June, bound for the Pacific Ocean.

Seringapatam was at Rio de Janeiro on 28 September 1806. She then was reported to have been round Cape Horn in March 1807. On 13 November 1807, Lloyd's List reported that she had captured two Spanish privateers round Cape Horn. She was still around Cape Horn between mid-May and July 1807. She returned to England on 12 September 1809.

=== Whaling voyage #5 (1810–1811) ===
Captain Robert Poole acquired a letter of marque on 14 March 1810. By one report Seringapatam sailed for Peru on 26 January 1810, but Lloyd's List reported that she sailed from Spithead on 22 May 1810, in a convoy, and ultimately bound for Peru. In September 1810 she was "all well" on the coast of Peru with 420 barrels of oil. She returned to England on 17 November 1811.

=== Whaling voyage #6 (1812–1815) ===
Captain William Stavers sailed from England on 13 March 1812, bound for the Pacific Ocean.

Seringapatam's crew included John Stavers as Mate and Francis Stavers as gunner. She then sailed towards the Galapagos Islands via Cape Horn. At the time of her capture Seringapatam did not have a letter of marque in hand as she had left before the outbreak of war with the United States and as she did not expect to encounter any French vessels. (Note: One authorizing her to take vessels belonging to the United States was issued in London on 12 December 1812, long after she had left England.) She carried 14 guns on her spar deck; she was pierced to carry guns on her gun deck, but did not carry any there. Although she did not have a letter of marque in hand, she nevertheless, on her way, captured Edward, of Nantucket, which was carrying 1200 barrels of oil, and sent her in to London as a prize. Edward was an American South Seaman, Woodward, master, and she arrived in the Downs on 14 June 1813.

==== Capture ====
In early 1813 Captain David Porter entered the Pacific, via Cape Horn, in the thirty-two gun frigate USS Essex. Originally Porter was assigned to rendezvous with two other warships but both encountered British warships and Porter went around the Horn alone. The mission was to harass the British whaling industry off South America and around the Galapagos Islands. Around the Galapagos, Porter and his men captured numerous British vessels and recaptured an American ship from the Peruvians. One of the vessels he captured was the letter of marque Greenwich, of 338 tons burthen, armed with 10 guns and having a crew of 25 men under the command of Captain Shuttleworth. At Tumbes he fitted her up as a storeship, increased her armament to 20 guns, and put her under the command of Lieutenant John M. Gamble, USMC. To assist Gamble, Porter gave him two seaman to act as mates, one of whom was a good navigator.

Greenwich captured Seringapatam off Tumbes, Peru, on 13 July 1813, after an exchange of broadsides, but apparently no casualties on either side. Seringapatam was somewhat damaged so Porter sent over his gunners and carpenters to work on her and in a few days they had repaired her, and upgraded her armament to 22 guns. Porter placed Master's Mate James Terry of Essex on board Seringapatam as prize master, and she then cruised with Porter's squadron.

Captain Stavers, when asked to surrender his privateer's commission, revealed that though he had applied for a letter of marque, he had not yet received one, but that it was probably waiting for him in Lima. Captain Porter announced that Stavers would be taken to the United States and be tried as a pirate, and ordered him and his crew to be put in irons. They were given more freedom after some liberated American whalers told Porter that the British had treated them well during their time as prisoners aboard Seringapatam.

Lloyd's List reported that Essex had captured Seringapatam, Stavers, master, New Zealander, Donneman, master, and Charlton, Halcrow, master. Porter then had put the captured crews aboard Charlton.

==== USS Seringapatam ====
In September, Porter found the frigate Essex in need of repairs and provisions and set sail for the island of Nuka Hiva, in the Marquesas, nearly 3,000 miles away. He took with him four of his prizes, Greenwich, Seringapatam, Sir Andrew Hammond, and Essex Junior. When the repairs to the Essex were completed and provisions taken on board, he set sail for the coast of Chile, accompanied by Essex Junior.

Prior to his departure on 12 December, Porter placed Seringapatam, Sir Andrew Hammond, and Greenwich under the guns of Fort Madisonville, which Porter had had erected. He further left a small force on the island under the command of Lieutenant Gamble. Many of the prisoners from the captured ships were Americans and they volunteered for service, as did some of the British captives. There were also six British prisoners of war. Soon after Porter sailed away, the local inhabitants became so troublesome that Gamble was forced to land a detachment of men to restore order.

In April 1814, despairing of Porter's return, Gamble began to rig Seringapatam and Sir Andrew Hammond with the intention of quitting the island. When signs of mutiny appeared, he had all the arms and ammunition put on board his own ship, Greenwich. (Note: By one, clearly erroneous report, Greenwich was back in London by December 1813.) Despite this precaution, the mutineers freed the prisoners of war and together captured Seringapatam on 7 May, wounding Gamble in the process. They then put him an open boat and sailed Seringapatam for Australia. Only one of Seringapatam's crew had been a member of her original crew; all the rest had been sent off in cartels Georgiana and Charlton.

==== Return to British control ====
The former prisoners of war and the mutineers sailed Seringapatam to New South Wales, stopping in Otahite on the way. When they arrived at Port Jackson, Seringapatam's crew gave an embellished, self-serving account of their exploits. It was only much later that a more mundane and less creditable account surfaced, less creditable in that eight of the 14 men had been turncoat British sailors.

Joseph Underwood, a local merchant, acted as the crew's agent in claiming salvage from the Court of Vice-Admiralty at Sydney, but the court referred the matter to London. On 16 October, at Governor Lachlan Macquarie's request, Captain Eber Bunker sailed Seringapatam to England, where she was returned to her owners.

Lloyd's List reported that 14 seamen from Greenwich and Sir Andrew Hammond had recaptured her in the Marquesas Islands and taken her into Port Jackson. From there she had sailed and after 17 weeks had arrived at Cowes on 11 February 1815 with cargo and passengers.

Seringapatam had left Sydney with 8594 seal skins and 92 casks of oil. Staver's journal reports that William Stavers reclaimed the original cargo from Halifax, Nova Scotia, on the cessation of hostilities with the United States.

== Whaler again ==
On Seringapatam's return to England, Melish & Co. returned her to whaling.

Year	Master	Owner	Trade	Notes and Source
1815	Thompson; Bunker; Lawson	Melish & Co.	London–South seas London–Botany Bay	Notation "captured" struck through; Lloyd's Register (LR)
1816	Lawson	Melish & Co.	Plymouth; London–Southern fishery	LR
1818	T. Baxter	Melish & Co.	London–Southern fishery	LR

=== Whaling voyage #7 (1817–1819) ===
Captain Baker sailed from England on 13 January 1817, bound for the Pacific Ocean. She was reported to have been near Concepción, Chile, on 25 May. Captain Kenny of Asp received a report that the Spanish authorities were seeking Seringapatam's master for the death of two boys. At some point Baxter replaced Baker. She returned to England on 17 November 1819 with 300 casks of whale oil.

=== Whaling voyage #8 (1820–1822) ===
Captain David Joy sailed from England on 9 March 1820 bound for New South Wales. Seringapatam was at Tonga, and in March 1821 at Bay of Islands with 80 barrels of whale oil and "Toy", master. She sailed from Sydney on 24 May 1822 to the Derwent River to fill up with "black oil". The Hobart Town Gazette of 22 June 1822, reported that Seringapatam was in Derwent, having been "uncommonly successful since her short stay here", having taken five or six whales. She was expected to be able to fill up at the Derwent and then proceed directly to England. She sailed from Hobart on 31 July 1822 for England, and arrived there on 16 November 1822 with 520 casks plus fins (baleen).

=== Whaling voyage #9 (1823) ===
Captain Thomas Allen sailed from England on 16 April 1823.

=== Whaling voyage #10 (1824–1827) ===
Captain Parker sailed from England on 23 September 1824, bound for Timor. At some point Captain Cole replaced Parker. She was reported to have been at Timor on 28 February 1825 with 200 barrel of whale oil. On 4 May 1827 she was at St Helena and she returned to England on 25 June with 400 skins.

=== Whaling voyage #11 (1827–1830) ===
Captain Richards sailed on 26 August 1827. On 15 May 1828 she had been out nine months and had gathered 300 barrels of whale oil. Between 12 and 16 November she was at Honolulu. On 27 March 1829 she was at Honolulu again, this time with 1550 barrels. She returned to England on 19 September 1830, with 450 casks of oil, one packet of ambergris, and 84 skins.

=== Whaling voyage #12 (1831–1834) ===
Captain Cressy sailed from England on 22 March 1831. At some point Captain Hammer replaced Cressy. She fished off Peru and returned to England on 25 June 1834 with more than 1600 barrels.

=== Whaling voyage #13 (1834–1838) ===
Lloyd's Register for 1833 shows Seringapatam's master as Creasey and her owner as Melish & Co. The 1834 volume shows her master as Hammer, changing to Wright, and her owner as Creighton.

Captain Wright sailed from England on 12 December 1834. Seringapatam returned to England from New Zealand on 4 September 1838 with 450 casks of whale oil.

=== Whaling voyage #14 (1838–1842) ===
Captain Edwin Courtney sailed from England on 29 October 1838, bound for Timor. Seringapatam was in the Timor Straits on 7 August 1839, and at Copang on 14 August. On 23 August Courtenay discovered a reef at 13°40′S 122°05′E that he named Seringapatam Reef for his ship.

On 17 March 1840 Seringapatam was at the Bay of Islands (New Zealand). By mid-1841 she was at Kosrae, and Sydney in October, with 2300 barrels. She returned to England on 13 March 1842 with 400 casks of oil.

=== Whaling voyage #15 (1843–1847) ===
Captain Brown sailed from England on 28 March 1843, bound for Timor and the seas off Japan. Seringapatam was reported to have been at Copang in 1843; there Brown was dead and her crew mutinous. Captain Lowell replaced Brown. She was at Guam in February 1845 and Sydney in April 1846 and again in June. Seringapatam apparently revisited Copang. She returned to England on 19 November 1847, with 240 casks or 1800 barrels. This was her last whaling voyage.

== Later career ==
Seringapatam's last voyage, per Lloyd's Register for 1849, was London-Sydney, with F. Lowell, master, and Chrichton, owner. Lloyd's Register for 1850 shows her with the same master and owner, but no trade, and she was absent from Lloyd's Register in 1851.

In 1852 Seringapatam returned to Lloyd's Register, still with Crichton, owner, but no master, and no trade, though she was listed as being at London. She also had had damages repaired in 1851.

Year	Master	Owner	Trade	Notes and source
1855	Surflen	Chrichton		LR
1860	Humphrey	Turnbull	Shields–Aden	Homeport of Hartpool; damages repaired in 1856 and 1858, and a large repair in 1858; LR
1861	W. Ramsey; J. Reeder	W. Ramsey; M. Shaw	Hartpool–Hamburg; Shields–Quebec	LR
1865	J. Reeder	M. Shaw	Shields–Quebec	LR

== Fate ==
Seringapatam is no longer listed in 1870.
