= Fort Madison, Nuku Hiva =

Former military installation in Nuku Hiva, French Polynesia

Coordinates: 8.9153°S 140.0950°W

Fort Madison
- Naval base
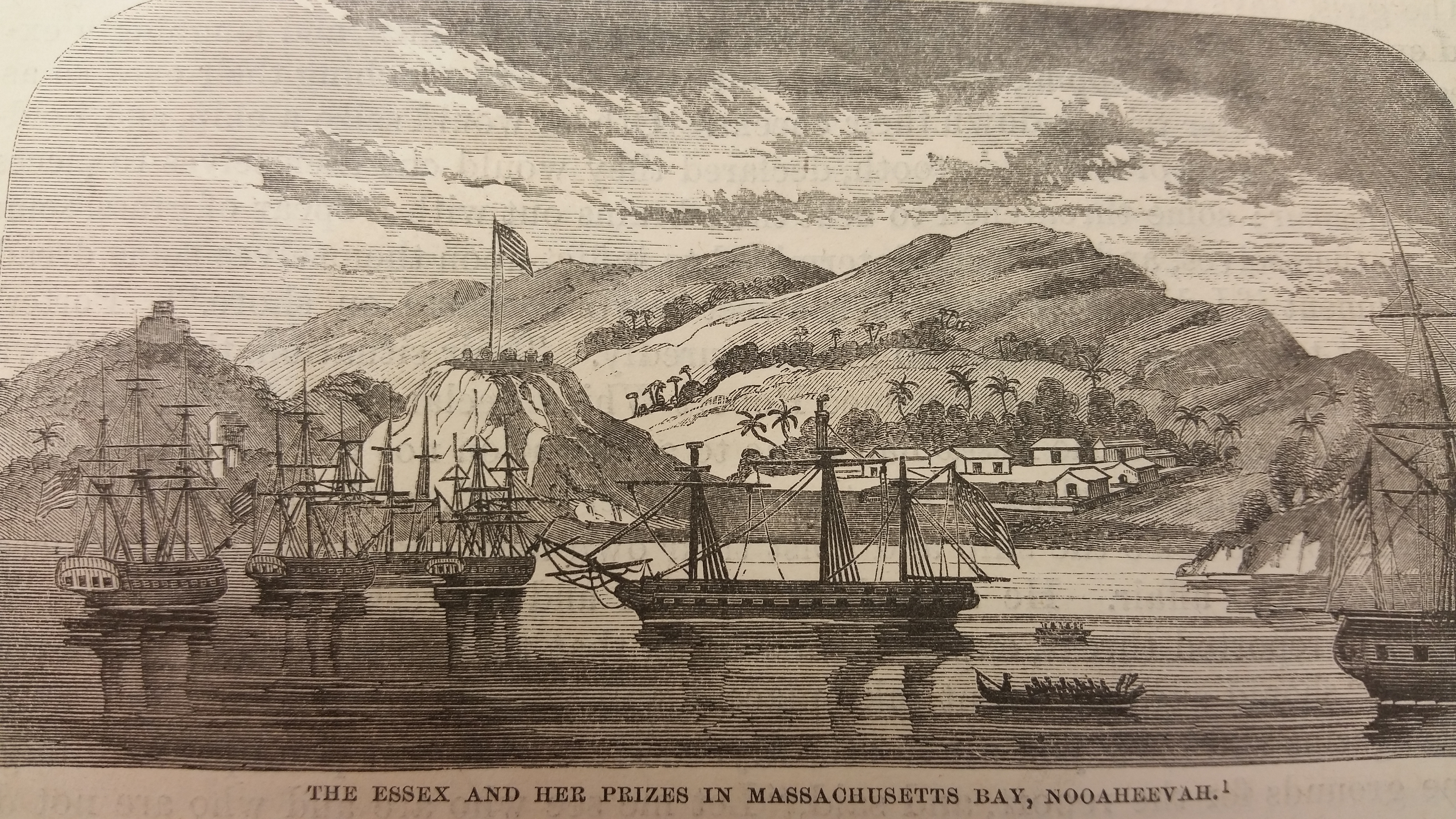
- Built by: United States
- Location: Nuku Hiva, Marquesas Islands, Pacific Ocean
- In use: 1813–1814
- Wars: War of 1812: Nuku Hiva Campaign

Fort Madison, on Nuku Hiva at Taioha'e Bay, was the first naval base of the United States in the Pacific Ocean. It was built by Commodore David Porter in October and November 1813, during the Nuku Hiva Campaign of the War of 1812, for protecting the settlement of Madisonville from British and Marquesan attacks. The fortification was named after President James Madison and armed with four cannons. Fort Madison was attacked only once, by British mutineers, in May 1814, and abandoned soon after.

== See also ==
- Fort Astoria
