= John M. Gamble =

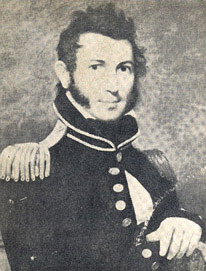
- Born: 1791; Brooklyn, New York
- Died: 11 September 1836 (aged 44–45); New York City
- Military career
- Allegiance: United States of America
- Branch: United States Marine Corps
- Service years: 1809-1836
- Rank: Brevet Lieutenant Colonel
- Units: USS Essex
- Commands: Greenwich; Sir Andrew Hammond; Fort Madison
- Conflicts: War of 1812: Action off Charles Island; Nuku Hiva Campaign; Seringapatam Mutiny; Action of 9 May 1814

Brevet Lieutenant Colonel John Marshall Gamble (1791 – 11 September 1836) was an officer in the United States Marine Corps during the early 19th century. He was the first, and remains the only known, U.S. Marine to command a U.S. Navy ship, commanding the prize ships Greenwich and Sir Andrew Hammond during naval actions in the Pacific during the War of 1812.

== Biography ==
Born in Brooklyn, New York, Gamble was commissioned a second lieutenant in the Marine Corps on 16 January 1809 at the age of 17.

Stationed in the South Sea in the Marine Detachment aboard the frigate USS Essex during the War of 1812, he rose to the rank of captain by June 1814. He distinguished himself in many enterprises, including encounters with people of the Marquesas Islands during the absence of USS Essex in 1813, and sailing a prize of Essex, the former whaler Sir Andrew Hammond, with only a four-man crew and without benefit of a chart in a 17-day voyage to the Hawaiian Islands.

Lieutenant Colonel Gamble is chiefly remembered in history as the only U.S. Marine to command a U.S. Navy ship, commanding two separate prize ships, the USS Greenwich and USS Sir Andrew Hammond, during the War of 1812: "...and, for want of sea officers, I placed Lieutenant Gamble of the Marines in charge of the Greenwich."

On or about 13 July 1813, (Note: Lieutenant Gamble's own memoirs recalled the actions on 12 July 1813, but Captain Porter's letters instead recalled 13 July 1813.) while commanding the Greenwich, Lieutenant Gamble's capture of the British armed whaler Seringapatam after a sharp engagement was noted as a triumph by American newspapers and thus earned him considerable fame upon his return. Seringapatam was deemed the biggest British threat to American whalers in the South Pacific at the time.

On 14 July 1813, Commodore Porter wrote of Lieutenant Gamble:

"Allow me to return to you my thanks for your handsome conduct in bringing the Seringapatam to action, which greatly facilitated her capture, while it prevented the possibility of her escape. Be assured, sir, I shall make a suitable representation of the affair to the honorable Secretary of the Navy."

Later, Commodore Porter wrote a further communication to the Navy Department:

"Captain Gamble at all times greatly distinguished himself by his activity in every enterprise engaged in by the force under my command, and in many critical encounters by the natives of Madison Island, rendered essential services, and at all times distinguished himself by his coolness and bravery. I therefore do, with pleasure, recommend him to the Department as an officer deserving of its patronage."

And again he wrote:

"I now avail myself of the opportunity of assuring you that no Marine officer in the service ever had such strong claims as Captain Gamble, and that none have been placed in such conspicuous and critical situations, and that none could have extricated themselves from them more to their honor."

Porter's later decision to burn the Greenwich at Nuku Hiva also served to deprive the British of the valuable whale oil, then badly needed in England. However, during the Nuku Hiva Campaign, Lieutenant Gamble was again ordered by Commodore Porter to assume command of a prize ship, the Sir Andrew Hammond, and after the Seringapatam Mutiny, where the British prisoners successfully regained control over the Seringapatam and sailed to Australia, Gamble set out to sail the Sir Andrew Hammond with a skeleton crew to the Leeward Islands, but was intercepted en route.

Gamble's subsequent capture by the British sloop HMS Cherub, also served to protect the American whaling efforts in the region. Aboard Sir Andrew Hammond, Gamble was carrying gifts to be delivered as a tribute to the King of the Leeward Islands. (Note: The Hawaiian Islands.) When these were taken by Captain Tucker of the Cherub as prizes of war, the diplomatic relations between the British and King of the Leeward Islands deteriorated.

When American whalers were seen in the harbor, Captain Tucker demanded the native king turn both whalers and the stockpiled whale oil over to him. Tucker went so far as to threaten the King by landing his Royal Marines to change the King's mind. The good king firmly said, "No." Tucker decided that a sloop's small complement of Marines and available firepower would be insufficient to force the issue, and thus sailed away.

While promoted to his substantial majority only in July 1834—a full 21 years after his most famous action with the Seringapatam—Gamble was breveted a lieutenant colonel on 3 March 1827, which rank he held until his death.

He died in New York City on 11 September 1836.

== Dates of rank ==
- Second Lieutenant - 16 January 1809
- First Lieutenant - 5 March 1811
- Captain - 18 June 1814
- Brevet Major - 19 April 1816
- Major - 1 July 1834
- Brevet Lieutenant Colonel - 3 March 1827

== Namesake ==
The destroyer USS Gamble (DD-123) was named for him and his brother, United States Navy Lieutenant Peter Gamble, as was ostensibly Port Gamble, Washington.

== See also ==
- Action off Charles Island
- Nuku Hiva Campaign

== Footnotes ==
Notes
