= New Zealander (1808 ship) =

History

Spain or France
- Name: Nancy
- Captured: c.1808

United Kingdom
- Name: New Zealander
- Acquired: 1808 by purchase of a prize
- Fate: Last listed 1825

General characteristics
- Tons burthen: 256, or 258, or 276 (bm)
- Length: 91 ft (27.7 m)
- Beam: 21 ft (6.4 m)
- Complement: 25 (1819)
- Armament: 8 × 6-pounder guns (1812)

New Zealander was a French or Spanish vessel taken in prize c.1807. Daniel Bennett, one of the leading owners of whalers plying the Southern Whale Fishery purchased her. She performed four voyages for him. During the second the United States Navy captured her, but the Royal Navy recaptured her. She returned to England for the last time in August 1820 and is last listed in 1825.

== Career ==
New Zealander first appeared in Lloyd's Register in 1808 with W. Elder, master, Bennett, owner, and trade London–South Seas.

=== 1st whaling voyage (1808–1812) ===
Captain William Elder sailed from England on 8 November 1808, bound for New Zealand.

In March 1810, half-a-dozen whalers gathered in Bay of Islands and launched a retributionary attack on the Maori. The whalers killed an estimated 16 to 60 Maori and burnt some structures. One sailor was accidentally killed. The vessels involved in the attack were Atalanta, Inspector, New Zealander, Perservernce, Speke, and Spring Grove.

New Zealander, "Alder", master, visited Port Jackson on 1 October 1810, before sailing for the Fishery again on 13 October. She visited again 23 July 1811 and left on 25 September, bound for England. She arrived back at England on 14 April 1812 with over 1300 barrels of sperm oil and 12,000 seal skins. She then underwent a "good repair".

=== 2nd whaling voyage (1812–1814) ===
Captain Donnemann / George Denman (or Donneman) sailed from England in 1812, bound for the Galápagos Islands. New Zealander was reported to be there on 22 April 1813. USS Essex captured New Zealander c.13 July 1813 in the Galápagos in the action off Charles Island. Captain David Porter, of Essex, put her crew and those of several other British whalers he had captured, aboard Charlton, and gave her up to the crews.

On 21 April 1814, HMS Belvidera recaptured New Zealander, Cheswicke, master. New Zealander was described as being of 256 tons, armed with six guns and with a crew of 17 men. She was sailing from the Marquesas to Philadelphia carrying a cargo of spermaceti oil. She had departed Valparaiso for the United States and was only one day out of New York when Belvidera recaptured her. Belvidera sent New Zealander into Halifax, Nova Scotia. New Zealander was carrying 1950 barrels of sperm oil when she was recaptured.

=== 3rd whaling voyage (1815–1817) ===
Captain George Denman sailed from England in 1815, again bound for the Galápagos. New Zealander, Dennison, master, arrived back at Gravesend on 29 September 1817 from Valparaiso.

=== 4th whaling voyage (1818–1820) ===
Captain Mark Monro (or Munro) sailed from England on 18 January 1818. She left New Zealand on 17 August 1819 with oil for the London market. She was described as being of 276 tons (bm), and having a crew of 25 men.

New Zealander, Munroe, master, arrived back at Gravesend from New Zealand on 8 August 1820. Notable passengers included Thomas Kendall (Church Mission Society), accompanied by New Zealand Maori chief Hongi Hika and the younger chief Waikato of Rangihoua.

== Fate ==
Her return to Gravesend in 1820 is the last mention of New Zealander in the arrival and departures listings in Lloyd's List. Lloyd's Register and the Register of Shipping continued to carry her until 1825, but with stale data.
