= HMS Astraea (1810) =

Apollo-class frigate of the Royal Navy

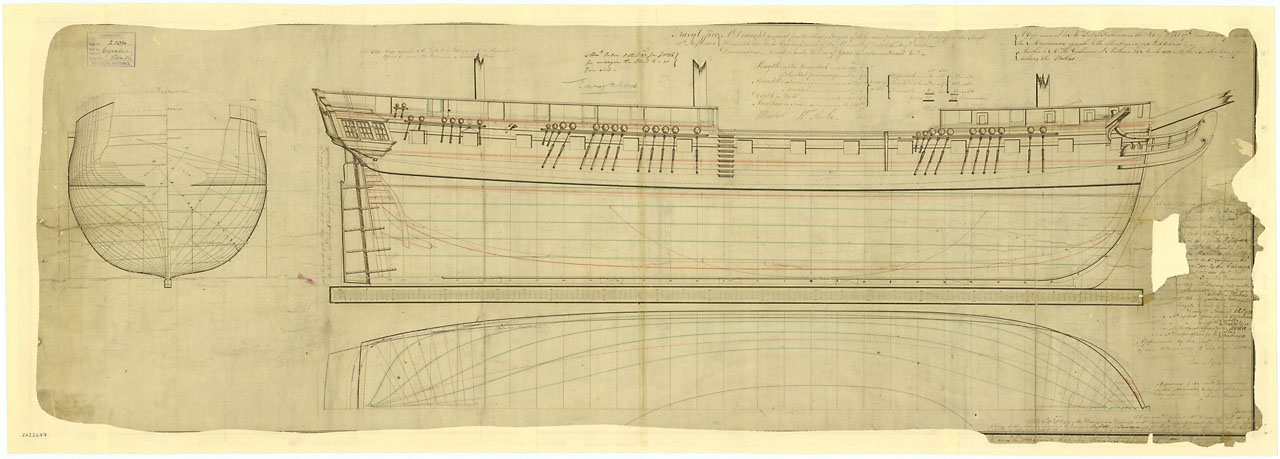
- Ship plan of an Apollo-class frigate

History

United Kingdom
- Name: HMS Astrea
- Launched: 1810
- Honours and awards: Naval General Service Medal with clasp "Off Tamatave 20 May 1811"
- Fate: Scrapped 1851

General characteristics
- Class & type: Apollo-class frigate
- Armament: 36 guns

HMS Astraea was a 36-gun Apollo-class fifth-rate frigate of the Royal Navy. Launched in 1810 at Northam, Southampton, she participated in the Battle of Tamatave and in an inconclusive single-ship action with the French frigate Etoile. Astrea was broken up in 1851.

== Indian Ocean ==
Astraea's first deployment was to the Cape of Good Hope under Captain Charles Marsh Schomberg. Shortly after his arrival, Schomberg was ordered to join the squadron of Captain Philip Beaver on the newly captured Mauritius. When Beaver sailed for the Seychelles in March 1811, the command of the naval forces on the island devolved to Schomberg.

On 6 May 1811, a French squadron of frigates under the command of Commodore François Roquebert in Renommée approached Grand Port, not realizing that Isle de France (now Mauritius) had fallen to the British. A squadron under James Hillyar chased them off. They also escaped an encounter with squadron under Captain Schomberg.

Schomberg took command of Hillyar's squadron and pursued the French to Tamatave on Madagascar. Between 7 and 9 May the frigates Galatea and Phoebe, under James Hillyar, and the brig-sloop Racehorse, sighted the French 40-gun frigates Renommée, Clorinde and Néréide off the Isle de France, whilst Astraea was lying in Port Louis.

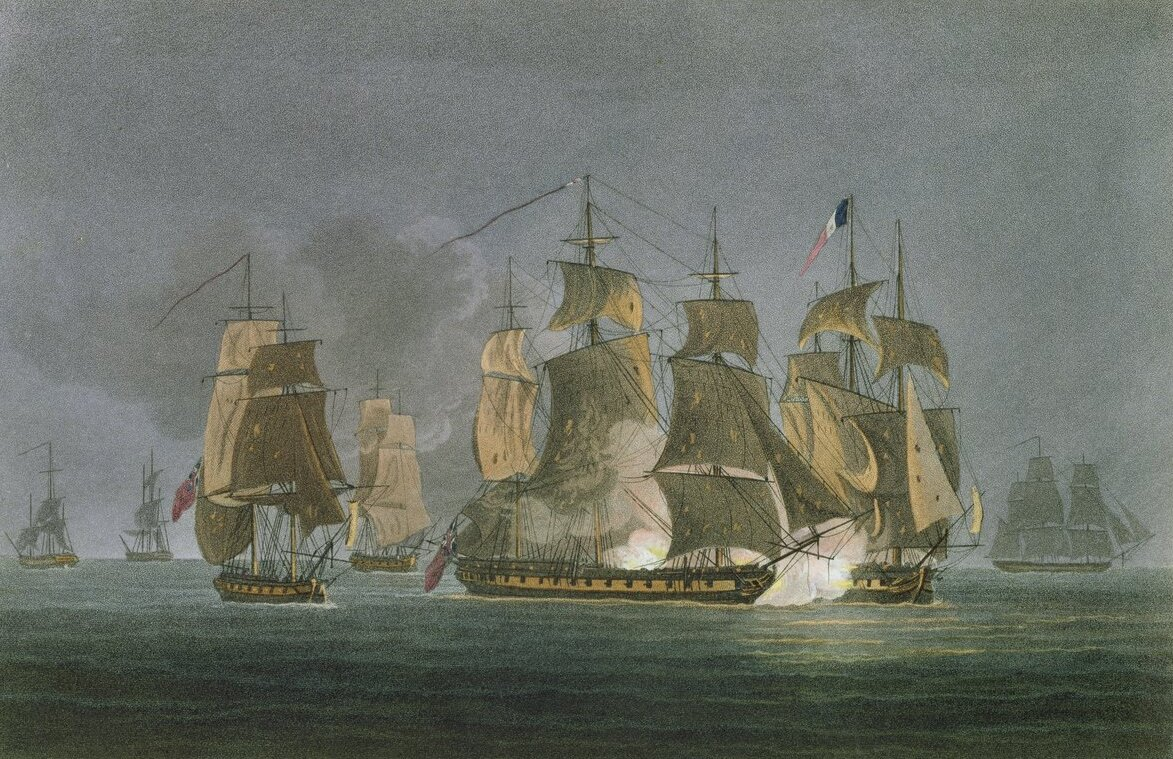
The Battle of Tamatave

On 14 May Astraea, Phoebe, Galatea, and Racehorse sailed from Port Louis for Tamatave, Madagascar and arrived on 20 May. The British squadron sighted the French squadron and made chase. A severe engagement, the Battle of Tamatave, ensued. During the battle, Renommée and Clorinde badly battered Galatea, with the result that she lost 16 men killed and 46 wounded – the largest number of casualties of any vessel in the squadron. Astraea too was heavily engaged and the British captured Renommée. Roquebert had sacrificed his flagship and ultimately his life to allow the frigates Clorinde and the badly damaged Néréide to escape. Astrea lost two men killed and 16 men wounded. In 1847 the Admiralty authorized the award of the Naval General Service Medal with clasp "Off Tamatave 20 May 1811" to all surviving claimants from the action.

Five days later, Schomberg's squadron rediscovered Néréide at Tamatave. The British persuaded the town's commander to surrender the town and Néréide without any further fight. The British took Néréide as Madagascar. The battle was the last action of the Mauritius campaign.

On 19 September she and Racehorse captured the French slaver brig Eclair. (Note: A first-class share of the bounty money for the slaves was worth £154 9s 9d; a sixth-class share, that of an ordinary seaman, was worth £1 2s 8d. A first-class share of a subsequent payment for the hull and stores was worth £105 7s 6d; a sixth-class share was worth 15s 5½d.)

After Beaver died in April 1813, Schomberg moved to Beaver's flagship, HMS Nisus. Captain John Eveleigh then took command of Astraea.

== Astrea vs. Etoile ==
In early 1814 Astrea was in company with Creole, which was under the command of Captain George Charles Mackenzie, who was Eveleigh's senior. The two frigates sailed for the Cape Verde Islands; they reached Maio early on 23 January 1814.

Off the Cape Verde Islands they encountered two frigates and two merchant ships, one a brigantine and the other a schooner, all at anchor. The French frigates did not respond to the Portuguese and Spanish flags that the British set and instead set sail as the British frigates approached; the British frigates then pursued them. Astrea had problems with her sails so Creole pulled ahead. She exchanged some shots and eventually four broadsides with the rearmost French frigate, which would turn out to be Sultane. Astraea then sailed between Creole and her opponent, coming alongside the French frigate. Two broadsides from Astrea then temporarily silenced the French frigate as fires aboard Creole took her out of the action for a while. She re-engaged Sultane, but then disengaged and sailed towards Santiago.

Astraea went ahead in pursuit of the first French frigate, which turned out to be the Etoile. Astraea exchanged a broadside and then crossed Etoile's bow and raked her. At this moment a shot took away Astraea's wheel and killed both quartermasters, causing Astraea to lose direction and momentum. Now the situation reversed, with French guns nearly touching Astraea's taffrail. She received broadsides that tore away her lower rigging, scarred her deck and destroyed one of her carronades. However, she suffered no damage forward. Astrea was able to get starboard to starboard with her opponent. The two vessels exchanged broadsides at close range for two hours until Etoile sailed off. During the engagement a pistol shot hit Eveleigh below the heart, mortally wounding him. Sultane came up and also exchanged a broadside with Astrea. Astrea, much damaged, broke off the engagement as the two French frigates too sailed away. Creole had suffered ten men dead and 26 wounded; Astrea lost nine men dead and 37 wounded.

That evening the two British ships anchored in Porto Praya on Santiago to effect repairs. (Hebrus later captured Etoile.) Command of Astraea passed to Captain William Black.

On 6 June, Astrea and Creole were in company when they captured the Spanish slave ship Gestruydis la Preciosa, and her cargo of slaves. At this time Astrea was under the command of Captain Benjamin Askley. (Note: Gertrudis (a) la Preciosa, Jose Torne, master, Manuel de Ondarza, owner, arrived at Freetown, Sierra Leone, on 1 July 1814 with 482 slaves. The Vice admiralty court there condemned her.) (Note: A first-class share of the prize money for the vessel and her cargo of slaves was worth £617 17s; a sixth-class share was worth £4 4s 1d.)

== Fate ==
Following the end of the Napoleonic Wars, Astraea spent seven years in ordinary. In 1823 the Navy converted her into hospital ship, in which state she remained until she was broken up in 1851.
