= HMS Galatea (1810) =

Frigate of the Royal Navy

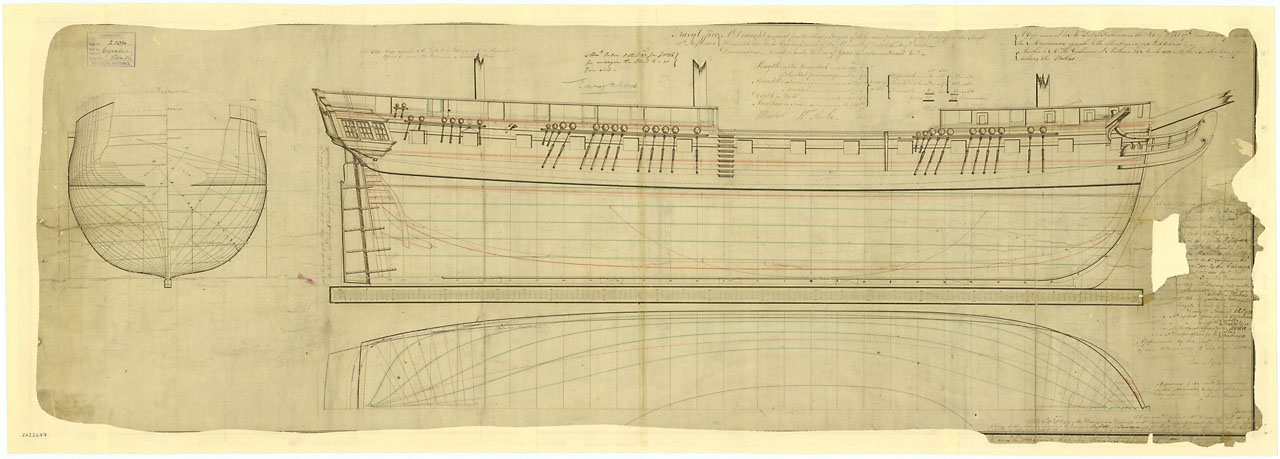
- Ship plan of an Apollo-class frigate

History

United Kingdom
- Name: HMS Galatea
- Ordered: 12 May 1809
- Builder: Deptford Dockyard
- Laid down: August 1809
- Launched: 31 August 1810
- Commissioned: September 1810
- Reclassified: Used as a coal hulk from August 1836
- Honours and awards: Naval General Service Medal with clasp "Off Tamatave 20 May 1811"
- Fate: Broken up in 1849

General characteristics as built
- Class & type: 36-gun Apollo-class frigate
- Tons burthen: 94730/94 (bm)
- Length: 145 ft (44.2 m) (gundeck); 121 ft 8 3/4 in (37.1 m) (keel)
- Beam: 38 ft 3 in (11.7 m)
- Depth of hold: 13 ft 3 1/2 in (4.1 m)
- Sail plan: Full-rigged ship
- Complement: 264
- Armament: Upper deck: 26 × 18-pounder guns; QD: 2 × 9-pounder guns + 10 × 32-pounder carronades; Fc: 2 × 9-pounder guns + 4 × 32-pounder carronades

HMS Galatea was a 36-gun Apollo-class fifth-rate frigate of the Royal Navy. The frigate was built at Deptford Dockyard, London, England and launched on 31 August 1810. In 1811 she participated in the Battle of Tamatave, which battle confirmed British dominance of the seas east of the Cape of Good Hope for the rest of the Napoleonic Wars. She was hulked in 1836 and broken up in 1849.

== Napoleonic Wars ==
Galatea was commissioned in September 1810 under Captain Woodley Losack, who would remain her captain until 1815. He sailed her to the Cape of Good Hope on 31 December 1810.

On 6 May 1811, a French squadron of frigates under the command of Commodore François Roquebert in Renommée approached Grand Port, not realizing that Isle de France (now Mauritius) had fallen to the British. The French squadron escaped an encounter with an equivalent British squadron under Captain Charles Marsh Schomberg of Astraea.

Between 7 and 9 May the frigates Galatea and Phoebe, under James Hillyar, and the brig-sloop Racehorse, sighted the French 40-gun frigates Renommée, Clorinde and Néréide off the Isle de France, whilst Astraea was lying in Port Louis.

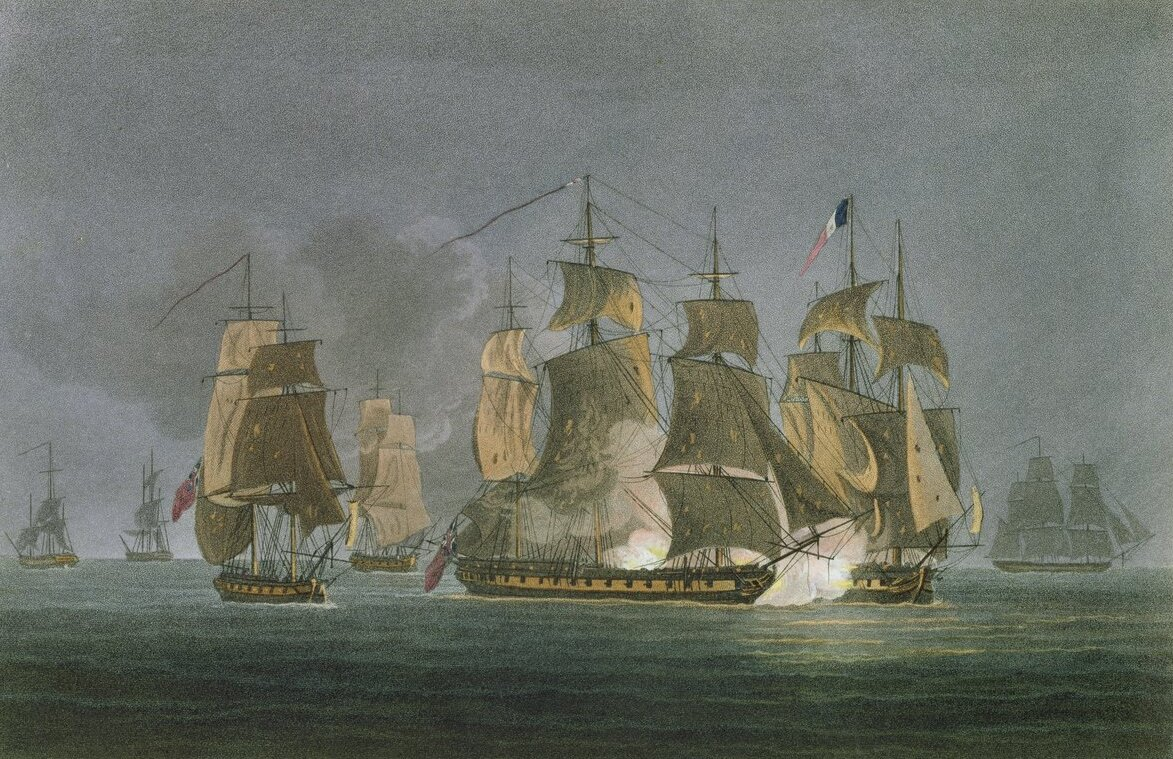
The Battle of Tamatave

On 14 May Astraea, Phoebe, Galatea, and Racehorse sailed from Port Louis for Tamatave, Madagascar and arrived on the 20th. The British squadron sighted the French squadron and made chase. A severe engagement, the Battle of Tamatave, ensued. During the battle, Renommée and Clorinde badly battered Galatea, with the result that she lost 16 men killed and 46 wounded – the largest number of casualties of any vessel in the squadron. (Note: Lieutenant Hugh Peregrine of the Royal Marines and 15 men were either killed or mortally wounded; Captain Losack, Lieutenant Thomas Bevis, Lieutenant Henry Lewis, midshipmen Henry Williams and Alexander Henning, 21 men and 3 boys were all wounded.) In 1847 the Admiralty authorized the award of the Naval General Service Medal with clasp "Off Tamatave 20 May 1811" to all surviving claimants from the action.

The British captured Renommée. Roquebert had sacrificed his flagship and ultimately his life to allow Clorinde and the badly damaged Néréide to escape. Five days later, Schomberg's squadron rediscovered Néréide at Tamatave. The British persuaded the town's commander to surrender the town, and Néréide, without any further fight.

The Royal Navy took Néréide in as Madagascar and Renommée as Java. The battle was the last action of the Mauritius campaign. Thereafter Galatea served primarily, and relatively uneventfully, as a convoy escort for the rest of war.

Galatea participated in the War of 1812.

On 27 September 1812, Galatea left St Helena, escorting three whalers: Admiral Berkley, Argo, and Frederick. Frederick separated from the other three ships on 27 October, off Ascension. On 31 October the convoy encountered USS President and USS Congress at 33°10′N 20°28′W. They gave chase and Congress captured Argo, but Galatea escaped and arrived at Portsmouth.

Galatea was in company with Spitfire when they recaptured the brig Fermina on 18 April 1813. On 1 June 1813 she sailed for Lisbon.

== Post-war ==
In October 1815 Galatea was laid up at Portsmouth. She underwent £36,187 in expenses for repairs and fitting for sea at Deptford from late 1819 to February 1826.

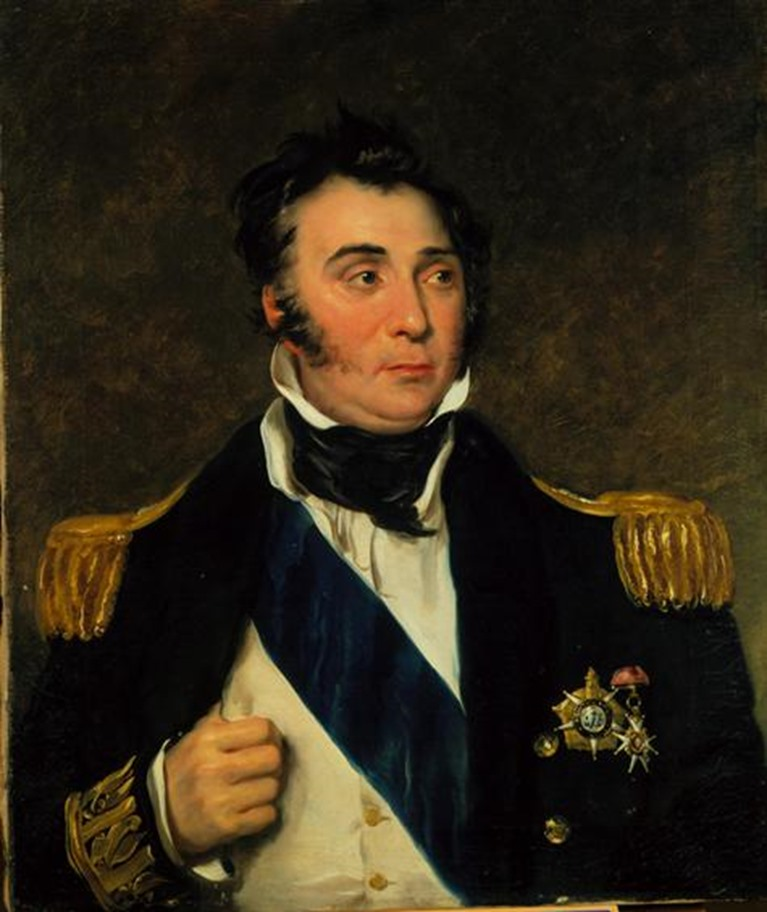
Sir Charles Napier (c. 1834)

In August 1825 Captain Sir Charles Sullivan recommissioned Galatea and then went on to command her on the coasts of Portugal and South America until 1829. From 8 January 1829 to 28 January 1832 her commander was Captain Charles Napier who, in a letter written shortly after his appointment, described her as "a ship that has the worst reputation in the Navy".

Between January and May 1829, Napier fitted her with an experimental system of his own design of paddles that the crew would work via winches on the main deck. The paddles proved useful for manoeuvering at speeds of up to 3 knots in windless conditions. On 12 September 1831 Galatea towed the line-of-battle ship Caledonia by means of paddles alone. Between December 1829 and February 1830 she underwent a refit that cost £12,595.

Twice during this period she cruised to the Caribbean, calling at Jamaica, Havana, Cuba and Tampico, Mexico. Between August and October 1830 she was sent to Lisbon to demand the restitution of British merchantmen which had been seized by the government of the Portuguese usurper Dom Miguel, and in May–July 1831 she was engaged in guarding British interests in the Azores when the forces of Dom Pedro were engaged in recovering those islands for the rightful queen, Donna Maria II. Napier quit Galatea in 1832 after she was paid off and succeeded George Sartorius as commander of Dom Pedro's navy in February 1833.

== Fate ==
Between August and September 1836, Galatea was at Plymouth being fitted as a receiving ship and a coal depot for Jamaica. She was then moved to Jamaica in 1840. She was broken up there in 1849 following an Admiralty order dated 24 September 1849.
