= Jean-François Lemaresquier =

Jean-François Lemaresquier (French pronunciation: [ʒɑ̃ fʁɑ̃swa ləmaʁɛskje]; Heugueville-sur-Sienne, 4 March 1767 – Battle of Tamatave, 18 May 1811) was a French naval officer.

== Career ==
=== Commanding Teazer ===
In 1806, Lemaresquier commanded the 14-gun brig Teazer, (Note: Captured from the Royal Navy in 1805 and brought into French service.) stationed at the entrance of the Gironde estuary at Le Verdon-sur-Mer. On 15 July, at 1:30 in the morning, twelve boats from the British blockade slipped into the estuary and boarded the 16-gun César, anchored nearby, capturing her without a fight. Lemaresquier, however, alerted his crew who repelled the British boats with small-arms fire. The next morning, César sailed away, to the surprise of Lemaresquier, who thought that she too had repelled the British; Teazer gave chased, but César was too quick and escaped after an exchange of fire that wounded Lemaresquier.

=== Commanding Diligente ===
On 11 August 1808, Lemaresquier commanded the 20-gun corvette Diligente, which sailed with the corvettes Sylphe and Espiègle from France with supplies for the island of Martinique. The 26-gun HMS Comet, under Featherstone Daly, chased the French squadron through the Bay of Biscay. The squadron changed course to avoid the stronger British corvette, which focused her attention on Sylphe, the weakest of the three French ships. Even though Sylphe made all sail and jettisoned part of her cargo, Cometcaught up with her at 15:30; Sylphe and surrendered after a one-hour fight. On 16 August, Espiègle encountered the 38-gun HMS Sybille. When Sybille caught up with Espiègle, Espiègle struck after a pro-forma discharge of her guns. Diligente being faster than her consorts, Lemaresquier out-sailed both the British ships and his companions, and sailed West.

On 6 September, off Barbados, Diligente encountered the 18-gun HMS Recruit, under Commander Charles Napier. The two corvettes came in range at 8:30 and both fired their broadsides, with the French fire wounding Napier. Both ships attempted to rake the other, but followed a parallel course, exchanging cannon fire until around 11:00, when Recruit's mainmast collapsed. Diligente was however prevented from pressing her advantage as Recruit's fire had left her hull in such a battered state that Lemaresquier had to order his gun crews to man the pumps to keep her afloat. By the time water was pumped out and the holes in the hull had been sealed, Recruit had retreated. Although the wind fallen so much that Diligente could catch up with Recruit before nightfall, by next morning, she had lost contact with Recruit.

James claims that Recruit kept fighting after her mast had fallen, and counter-attacked at 2 in the morning, forcing Diligente to flee; Troude disputes this account.

=== Commanding Néréide ===
In 1810, Lemaresquier was captain of the 38-gun frigate Néréide. On 9 February, inbound from Saint-Servan, he reached Guadeloupe. Before sailing into harbour, Lemaresquier ordered a boat to launch and reconnoitre the island. In the morning, Lemaresquier spotted a British ship of the line, three frigates and one corvette, which gave chase; he succeeded in outrunning them and breaking contact; he assumed that such a concentration of ships meant Guadeloupe had fallen to the British. Indeed, the Invasion of Guadeloupe had been completed three days earlier.

On 15 March, Néréide was chased by the 28-gun HMS Rainbow, under James Woolbridge, and the 18-gun HMS Avon, under Henry Fraser. Mistaking Rainbow for a frigate, Lemaresquier fled to separate the two British ships, but stopped to engage Rainbow after Avon had fallen back. He soon had reduced Rainbow to a battered state, but Avon resolutely came in support and put a 30-minute fight against the much stronger Néréide before herself retreating. Damage on Néréide prevented her from giving chase. Lemaresquier therefore continued on his course, reaching Brest on 30 March.

On 3 February 1811, Lemaresquier departed Brest with a squadron under François Roquebert, bound for Île de France. In addition to Néréide and the flagship Renommée, the squadron comprised Clorinde, under Jacques Saint-Cricq. On the very day of their departure, an 18-day storm broke out, damaging the rigging of the frigates and breaking a gun port on Clorinde, through which she took in so much seawater that part of her food and gunpowder were flooded. The squadron arrived off Ile de France in the night of 6 May. Roquebert ordered boats to reconnoitre the island to ascertain whether the planned Invasion of Île de France by the British had already taken place; in fact, the island had fallen on 3 December 1810. The forts of Île de la Passe hoisted French flags, but their failure to answer codes convinced Roquebert that he had a British trap before him, and the squadron departed for Réunion, after unsuccessfully chasing a British squadron.

On 12, the French arrived at Réunion, but the state of the sea prevented them from reconnoitring the island, and they diverted to Madagascar. They arrived at Tamatave on 19 May, where the next day the British squadron that they had chased earlier arrived, having received reinforcements.

The French and British engaged in the Battle of Tamatave. Lemaresquier was killed on Néréide around 17:30.

== Sources and references ==
=== Bibliography ===
- Roche, Jean-Michel (2005). Dictionnaire des bâtiments de la flotte de guerre française de Colbert à nos jours, 1671 - 1870. Group Retozel-Maury Millau. p. 344. ISBN 978-2-9525917-0-6. OCLC 165892922.
- Fonds Marine. Campagnes (opérations; divisions et stations navales; missions diverses). Inventaire de la sous-série Marine BB4. Tome premier : BB4 1 à 482 (1790-1826)
- Troude, Onésime-Joachim (1867). Batailles navales de la France. Vol. 3. Challamel ainé. pp. 160–162.
- Troude, Onésime-Joachim (1867). Batailles navales de la France. Vol. 4. Challamel ainé. pp. 160–162.
- James, William (2002) [1827]. The Naval History of Great Britain, Volume 1, 1793–1796. London: Conway Maritime Press. ISBN 0-85177-905-0. OCLC 165702223.
