= Charles Marsh Schomberg =

British naval officer and colonial governor (1779–1835)

Captain Sir Charles Marsh Schomberg KCH CB
- Born: 1779; Dublin, Ireland
- Died: 2 January 1835 (aged 55–56); Carlisle Bay, Barbados
- Burial place: St Paul's Chapel, Bridgetown, Barbados
- Relatives: Alexander Schomberg (father); Alexander Wilmot Schomberg (brother)
- Military career
- Allegiance: Great Britain; United Kingdom
- Branch: Royal Navy
- Service years: 1788–1835
- Rank: Captain
- Commands: HMS Termagant; HMS Charon; HMS Madras; HMS Hibernia; HMS Foudroyant; HMS President; HMS Astraea; HMS Nisus; HMS Rochfort; Cape of Good Hope Station
- Conflicts: French Revolutionary Wars; Battle of the Nile; Siege of Genoa; Egyptian Campaign; Siege of Alexandria; Napoleonic Wars; Dardanelles operation; Battle of Tamatave
- Awards: Order of the Bath; Royal Guelphic Order; Order of the Crescent; Order of the Tower and Sword
- Other work: Lieutenant-Governor of Dominica

Captain Sir Charles Marsh Schomberg KCH CB (1779 – 2 January 1835) was a British Royal Navy officer, who served during French Revolutionary and Napoleonic Wars, and later served as Lieutenant-Governor of Dominica.

== Biography ==
=== Family background ===
Schomberg was born in Dublin, the youngest son of the naval officer Captain Sir Alexander Schomberg and Arabella Susannah, the only child of the Reverend Henry Chalmers, and niece of Sir Edmund Aleyn. His older brother was Admiral Alexander Wilmot Schomberg.

=== Early naval career ===
Schomberg entered the navy in 1788 as captain's servant on the yacht of the Lord Lieutenant of Ireland, Dorset, under his father's command. From 1793, at the outbreak of the French Revolutionary War, he served as midshipman aboard Cumberland and the 74-gun Minotaur under Captain Thomas Louis. On 30 April 1795 he was promoted to lieutenant, and was transferred to Rattler, serving under the Commanders Willoughby Lake and John Cochet, until returning to Minotaur in August 1796. In early 1797 Minotaur was sent to reinforce the fleet off Cádiz and was engaged in several boat actions with the Spanish flotilla and shore batteries. Minotaur remained part of the inshore squadron off Cádiz until 24 May 1798, when she sailed for the Mediterranean, in company with a squadron under the command of Captain Thomas Troubridge. They joined the squadron of Sir Horatio Nelson near Toulon, and subsequently defeated the French at the battle of the Nile in August 1798. During the battle Minotaur fought Aquilon, and after her surrender she was taken possession of by Schomberg.

Between November 1798 and October 1799 Schomberg, now the first lieutenant of Minotaur, was employed on the coast of the Kingdom of Naples. In mid-1800 Minotaur served as the flagship of Lord Keith at the siege of Genoa. On 3 September 1800, under the command of Captain James Hillyar of Niger, Schomberg led the boats of Minotaur in the successful cutting out of the Spanish corvettes Esmeralda and Paz off Barcelona.

Schomberg then served as Flag Lieutenant to Lord Keith, aboard Foudroyant, during the Egyptian Campaign. He was sent to Cairo to act as a liaison officer between Keith and the Kapudan Pasha, the commander of Turkish naval forces, during the Siege of Alexandria. Schomberg was appointed acting-commander of the sloop Termagant, though it is unclear if he ever took command of her as he was employed onshore until the surrender of the French in September 1801. He was appointed to command of Charon, a 44-gun ship armed en flûte, employed in transporting French troops from Alexandria to Malta, under the terms of the French capitulation. Following the evacuation of Egypt Schomberg was sent on a mission to Tunis, for which Sir Alexander Ball, the Governor of Malta, later presented him with a handsome piece of plate, and for his services in Egypt he was awarded the Imperial Ottoman Order of the Crescent. On 29 April 1802 his promotion to commander was confirmed.

=== Post-captain ===
Schomberg was promoted to post-captain on 6 August 1803, and he took command of the 54-gun Madras, stationed as guard ship at Malta. Lord Collingwood nominated Schomberg for command of Athenienne, but she was wrecked on 27 October 1806. In February 1807 Schomberg took part in the failed Dardanelles Operation under John Duckworth, but on his return to Malta Madras was put out of commission, and he returned to England, after an absence of more than ten years.

On his arrival he was appointed to Hibernia and immediately sailed from Torbay to Lisbon, to announce the imminent arrival of a British squadron, sent to evacuate the royal family of Portugal, as the French were about to enter the country. Unfortunately poor weather and contrary winds meant he arrived off the Tagus after the British squadron, and so negotiations were already underway by Sir W. Sidney Smith, who he then joined aboard Foudroyant as flag captain as they transported the royal family to Brazil in November 1807. Schomberg was later made a Knight of the Portuguese Order of the Tower and Sword.

In January 1809 while at Rio de Janeiro Smith appointed Schomberg to command of President, but when the Admiralty sent out another captain for that ship, Schomberg was relieved of command, and returned to England in April 1810. In July he was appointed to the frigate Astraea, which he fitted out and sailed to the Cape of Good Hope in company with Scipion, flagship of Rear-Admiral Robert Stopford. On their arrival Stopford sent Astraea and Phoebe to reinforce the squadron stationed off the Île de France (now Mauritius) under Captain Philip Beaver in Nisus.

=== The Battle of Tamatave ===
In the absence of Captain Beaver, Schomberg was in command on 20 May 1811, when Astraea, the frigates Phoebe and Galatea, and the brig-sloop Racehorse met and defeated a force of three large French frigates that were bringing reinforcements to Mauritius (unaware of its capture by the British the previous November). One French frigate, Renommée, surrendered to Schomberg's ship; Néréide escaped, only to surrender at Tamatave in Madagascar a few days later; and Clorinde escaped for good. The Battle of Tamatave marked the last French attempt to operate in the Indian Ocean during the Napoleonic Wars. Nearly four decades later the battle was among the actions recognised by a clasp attached to the Naval General Service Medal, awarded upon application to all British participants still living in 1847. In April 1813, following the unexpected death of Captain Beaver, Schomberg took command of Nisus, and sailed from the Cape to Brazil, and from there to Portsmouth escorting a large merchant convoy, arriving at Spithead in March 1814. Schomberg was preparing his ship for service in North America, when the Admiralty ordered her to be put out of commission.

=== Later career ===
Schomberg was appointed a Companion of the Order of the Bath on 4 June 1815. From April 1820 to April 1824 he commanded Rochfort as flag captain to Sir Graham Moore in the Mediterranean, and from September 1828 until 1832 served as Commodore and Commander-in-Chief at the Cape of Good Hope Station, with Maidstone as his flagship. On 21 September 1832 he was made a Knight Commander of the Royal Guelphic Order. On 7 February 1833 Schomberg was appointed Lieutenant Governor of Dominica. He died on 2 January 1835, while in that service, aboard President, the flagship of Sir George Cockburn, while anchored in Carlisle Bay. He was interred in St Paul's Chapel on the same day.

Military offices
Preceded by William Skipsey	Commander-in-Chief, Cape of Good Hope Station; 1828–1831	Succeeded by Frederick Warren
