= Thomas Briggs (Royal Navy officer) =

Royal Navy Admiral (1780–1852)

Admiral Sir Thomas Briggs GCMG
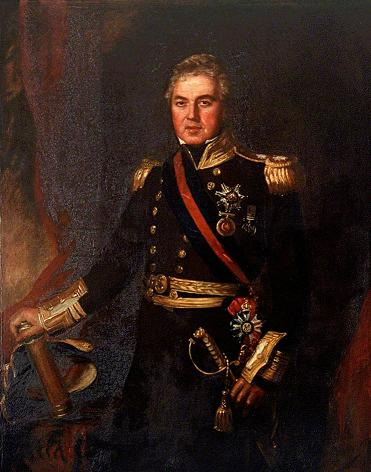
- Portrait of Vice-Admiral Sir Thomas Briggs (artist unknown)
- Born: 1780
- Died: 16 December 1852 (aged 71–72)
- Military career
- Allegiance: United Kingdom
- Branch: Royal Navy
- Rank: Admiral
- Commands: HMS Salamine; HMS Madras; HMS Agincourt; HMS Orpheus; HMS Theseus; HMS Clorinde; HMS Leviathan; Royal Naval Dockyard, Bermuda; Royal Naval Dockyard, Malta; Commander-in-Chief, Portsmouth
- Conflicts: French Revolutionary Wars; Napoleonic Wars
- Awards: Knight Grand Cross of the Order of St Michael and St George; Order of the Crescent

Admiral Sir Thomas Briggs GCMG (1780 – 16 December 1852) was an officer of the British Royal Navy who served during the French Revolutionary and Napoleonic Wars, and went on to be Commander-in-Chief, Portsmouth.

== Early life and career ==
The only surviving son of Francis Briggs, Chief Surgeon at Madras, and Magdalene Pasley, Briggs entered the Navy on 10 September 1791. He first served as a first class volunteer aboard the ship Bellerophon, under the command of his uncle Captain Thomas Pasley. He later followed him into the ship Vengeance with the rank of midshipman. Between 1793 and 1798 Briggs served under Captain Charles Tyler in the Meleager, Diadem and Aigle, taking part in the operations against Toulon and Corsica in 1793–94, and saw action under Admiral William Hotham in the Battle of Genoa on 14 March and the Battle of Hyères Islands on 13 July 1795.

Briggs was promoted to lieutenant on 28 September 1797, and was transferred from Aigle to Ville de Paris, flagship of Admiral Earl St. Vincent off Lisbon, and shortly afterwards moved to Princess Royal, flying the flag of Rear-Admiral Thomas Frederick off Cádiz.

== Commands ==
On 10 July 1799 Briggs was appointed acting-commander of the sloop HMS Salamine, and was officially confirmed in that rank on 30 June 1800, having taken part in the reduction of Genoa earlier. In March 1801 Captain Manley Dixon of Genereux at Port Mahon, sent Briggs to Rear-Admiral Sir John Borlase Warren's fleet with the news that Admiral Honoré Ganteaume had sailed from Toulon bound for Egypt. Warren intercepted the French fleet and pursued them back to Toulon. Briggs was then engaged in the expedition to Egypt under Lord Keith and Sir Ralph Abercromby, for which he was awarded the Turkish Gold Medal and the Order of the Crescent, and was promoted to post-captain on 24 July 1801. He commanded Madras, flagship of Sir Richard Bickerton off Alexandria, then Agincourt on the Mediterranean and Home stations from 1802.

From 14 December 1805 he was appointed to command of the frigate Orpheus, and in late 1806 captured two privateers; Guadeloupe of 3 guns and 54 men on 25 September, and Susanna of 4 guns and 20 men on 12 November. Orpheus was shortly after wrecked on a coral reef off Port Royal, Jamaica, on 23 January 1807, and Briggs had to be rescued from the bowsprit of his ship by a boat from Elephant.

On 27 April 1808 Briggs took temporary command of Theseus off L'Orient, before assuming command of Clorinde on 7 November, sailing to the East Indies Station. There, on 28 January 1810, he captured the privateer L' Henri, of 8 guns and 57 men, and proved of material service in disembarking the troops at the reduction of the Île de France in December 1810. He was next employed in the China Sea, and in October 1814, took command of Leviathan in which he served on the Lisbon, Cork, and Mediterranean stations, before being paid off on 19 July 1816.

On 15 May 1818, Briggs joined Queen Charlotte, as Flag-Captain to Sir George Campbell, Commander-in-Chief, Portsmouth, serving there until February 1821.

== Admiral ==
In 1823 Briggs was appointed Resident Commissioner of the Royal Naval Dockyard at Bermuda. He transferred to Malta in 1829, being promoted to Rear-Admiral on 27 June 1832, and was appointed Superintendent of the Malta Dockyard, remaining in that post until 1838. He was awarded the Knight Grand Cross of the Order of St Michael and St George in 1833, for his services while in temporary command of the Mediterranean Squadron, and was promoted to Vice-Admiral on 23 November 1841.

Briggs was promoted to Admiral of the Blue on 1 July 1851, and from September served as Commander-in-Chief, Portsmouth, flying his flag on Victory, and dying in office in December 1852.

== Personal life ==
In 1814 he married Isabella Harriet Trepand, and had three sons and a daughter. His eldest son, George Campbell Briggs, died while serving in the Navy with the rank of lieutenant. His daughter married Captain George Bohun Martin, RN.

Military offices
Preceded by New Post	Admiral Superintendent, Malta Dockyard; 1832–1838	Succeeded by John Louis
Preceded by Sir Thomas Capel	Commander-in-Chief, Portsmouth; 1851–1852	Succeeded by Sir Thomas Cochrane
