= Battle of Tamatave =

1811 battle of the Mauritius campaign of 1809–1811

- Part of the Mauritius campaign of 1809–1811
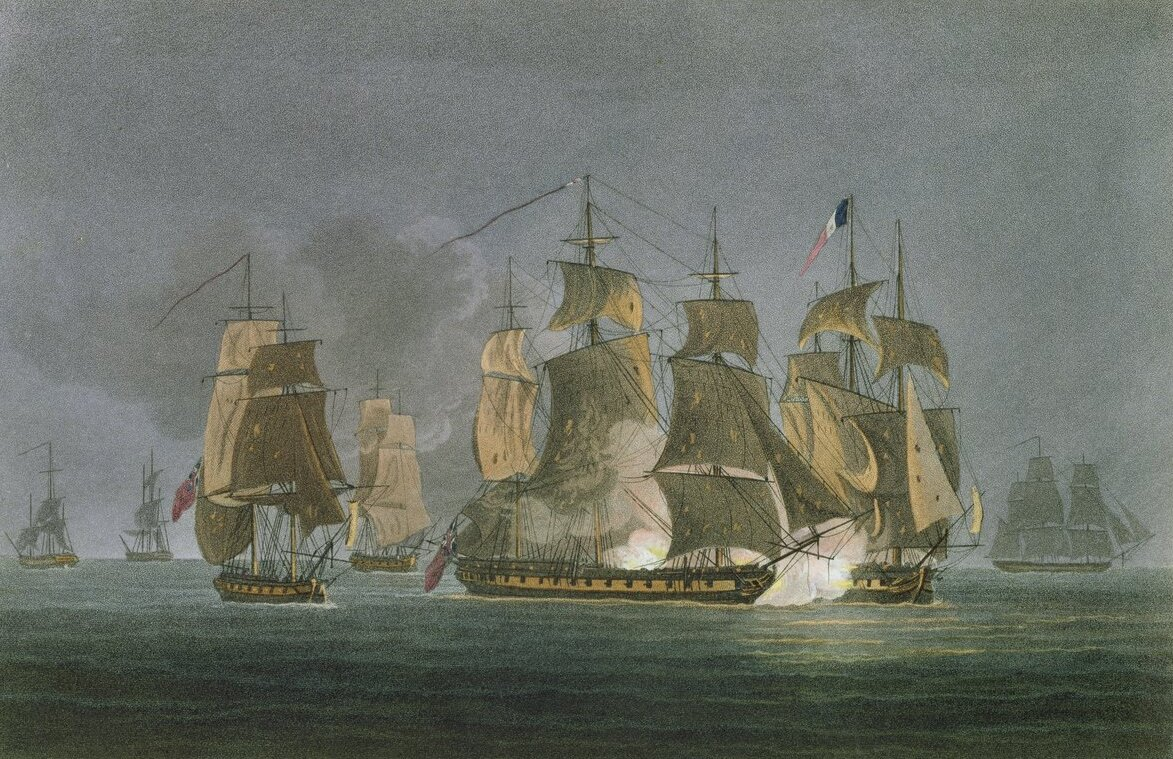
- 1820 illustration of the battle by Thomas Whitcombe
Date	20 May 1811
Location	Off Tamatave, Indian Ocean 18°09′00″S 49°30′00″E
Result	British victory

Belligerents
United Kingdom	France

Commanders and leaders
Charles Schomberg	Dominique Roquebert †

Strength
3 frigates 1 brig sloop	3 frigates

Casualties and losses
25 killed 86 wounded	156 killed or wounded 1 frigate captured
- Location within Madagascar

The Battle of Tamatave (also known as the Battle of Madagascar or action of 20 May 1811) was fought off Tamatave in the Indian Ocean between British and French frigate squadrons during the Napoleonic Wars. The action was the final engagement of the Mauritius campaign of 1809–1811, and it saw the destruction of the last French attempt to reinforce their garrison on Isle de France. Although the news had not reached Europe by February 1811 when the reinforcement squadron left Brest, a British invasion of Isle de France resulted in the colony falling by December 1810, the French defences hampered by the lack of the supplies and troops carried aboard the frigate squadron under the command of Commodore Dominique Roquebert in Renommée. Roquebert's heavily laden ships reached Isle de France on 6 May and discovered that the island was in British hands the following day, narrowly escaping a trap laid by a squadron of British frigates ordered to hunt and destroy them.

On 20 May the British squadron, under the command of Captain Charles Marsh Schomberg, discovered the French off Tamatave and attacked, both sides hampered by light winds which impeded movement for much of the day. During a period of calm weather early in the battle, the French were better positioned than the disorganised British squadron and Roquebert's ships inflicted severe damage on several British vessels before an increasing breeze allowed Schomberg to press home his attack. As the evening approached, the French attempted to escape, Roquebert sacrificing his flagship and ultimately his life to allow the frigates Clorinde and the badly damaged Néréide to escape. Five days later, Schomberg's squadron rediscovered Néréide at Tamatave and persuaded the town's commander to surrender without a fight. The battle was the last action of the campaign and confirmed British dominance of the seas east of the Cape of Good Hope for the rest of the Napoleonic Wars.

== Background ==
In August 1810, the French squadron on Isle de France achieved the most significant French naval victory of the Napoleonic Wars, when they captured or destroyed four Royal Navy frigates at the Battle of Grand Port. The battle was fought inside Grand Port, one of the harbours of Isle de France into which the French squadrons, dominant in the Indian Ocean during 1809, had been steadily pushed and blockaded by pressure from a British squadron under Commodore Josias Rowley. The British defeat had a noticeable galvanising effect on both the British and French naval commands: both recognised that the campaign would be won by the first to reinforce and resupply their forces. Although the French had achieved a significant victory, the naval bases on Isle de France lacked the military stores and food supplies to repair the battle damage to their ships or supply lengthy raiding voyages against British trade routes.

The British reaction was immediate: ships were dispatched from regional bases at Madras, the Cape of Good Hope and Rodriguez to replace Rowley's losses while a larger force was collected at Rodriguez in preparation for a major invasion of Isle de France intended to permanently eliminate the island as a raiding base. The French response from their squadron on Isle de France, based at Port Napoleon under Commodore Jacques Hamelin, was to exercise their regional superiority by attacking British reinforcements at the actions of 13 September 1810 and 18 September 1810. Despite inflicting severe damage on two British frigates, the French lost one of their own, captured with Hamelin aboard, and suffered two more damaged. Without supplies or reinforcements to replace these losses, the French were unable to resist the British invasion in November 1810 and the island fell within four days.

The French had also been preparing reinforcements for the region, but their nearest naval bases were in France itself, several thousand miles away across oceans almost totally controlled by the Royal Navy. These distances also delayed the arrival of news from the Indian Ocean, and therefore word had still not reached France of the fall of Isle de France by 17:00 on 2 February 1811, when a reinforcement squadron set sail from Brest. This squadron consisted of three powerful frigates, Renommée under Commodore Dominique Roquebert, Clorinde under Captain Jacques de Saint-Cricq and Néréide under Captain Jean-François Lemaresquier. Each ship carried over 200 soldiers for the Isle de France garrison and significant food and military supplies with which to refit Hamelin's squadron and resupply the island. The French authorities were aware of the possibility that Isle de France had been captured, and had ordered that if the island was in British hands, the squadron should continue on to the Dutch city of Batavia on Java, to operate against the British from there.

== February to May 1811 ==
By 1811, the Royal Navy enjoyed a worldwide naval supremacy over the French, including the seas immediately off the French coast. To avoid being attacked as they left Brest, French ships had to attempt to slip out either under cover of darkness or during storms that drove the British away from the dangerous coastline. This also however forced the French ships to fight against the wind to leave their harbours and as a result, Roquebert's ships only covered 600 nautical miles (1,100 km) in the first 18 days. On 24 February, the squadron captured a Portuguese merchant ship and discovered Lisbon newspapers aboard that announced the British invasion, although not its outcome. On 13 March, Roquebert's ships crossed the Equator and on 18 April they passed the Cape of Good Hope at distance, benefitting from good weather and a strong breeze during the latter stages of the journey. At 23:00 on 6 May, 93 days after leaving Brest, the French convoy arrived off Île de la Passe at the entrance to Grand Port.

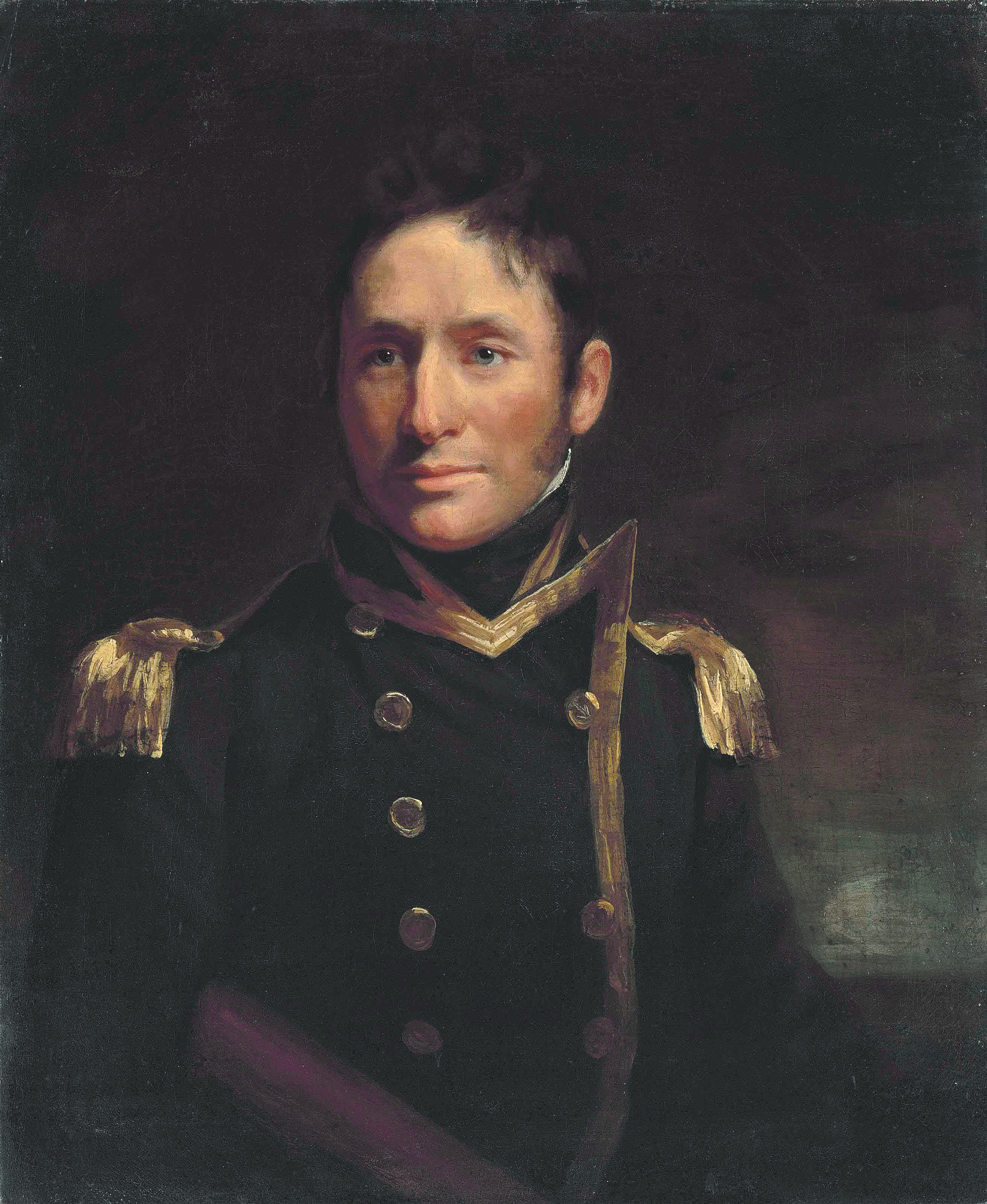
1805 portrait of Philip Beaver

The British had not been idle during the six months they had occupied Isle de France, now renamed Mauritius. The invasion fleet had broken up soon after the island fell and command of the remaining naval forces on the island had been given to Captain Philip Beaver. On 5 January, a small French dispatch ship had been captured off Port Louis (formerly Port Napoleon) and from the messages aboard the nature and destination of Roquebert's squadron was discovered. Information was also received describing a second French force being prepared for operations in the region, consisting of the frigates Nymphe and Méduse. Aware of the impending arrival of French reinforcements, Admiral Robert Stopford at the Cape of Good Hope sent Captain James Hillyar in HMS Phoebe to reinforce Beaver on Mauritius. Beaver ordered Hillyar, with HMS Galatea under Captain Woodley Losack and HMS Racehorse under Captain James de Rippe, to prepare for the arrival of Roquebert's convoy. Beaver then began eliminating French harbours in the western Indian Ocean, sending the brig HMS Eclipse to attack Tamatave in Madagascar, which was captured on 12 February. After the end of the hurricane season in March, Beaver personally sailed in HMS Nisus to invade the Seychelles, before collecting specie from Madras to refloat the Mauritian economy. In his absence, Mauritius came under the command of Captain Charles Marsh Schomberg in HMS Astraea.

When Roquebert's ships appeared off Grand Port, Hillyar had his three ships in the harbour ready to sail at short notice and ensured that French tricolours were flying from Île de la Passe and other landmarks in the hope that the French could be lured into the shallow waters of the bay and defeated in a similar manner to the British defeat at the battle at Grand Port the previous year. Signals were exchanged between the French squadron and the shore but Roquebert was wary: the signals from Île de la Passe were out of date and he knew of the British invasion from the Lisbon newspapers captured two months before. Waiting offshore, the French commodore sent three boats ashore during the night with instructions to discover the situation on the island. Seizing two black inhabitants, one of the boats returned on the morning of 7 May and from his captives Roquebert learned that the British had captured the island six months earlier. The other landing parties were captured by British troops and did not return. With Hillyar's trap uncovered, Roquebert raised French colours and turned eastwards away from Grand Port, Hillyar emerging from the harbour to give chase.

== Roquebert's escape ==
At 04:00 on 8 May, Roquebert realised that his overladen ships were too slow to outrun Hillyar's squadron, which was 6 nautical miles (11 km) behind and gaining rapidly. At 08:00, he decided to turn and meet the British ships head-on rather than be overtaken. Hillyar, aware that his squadron was weaker than Roquebert's, held back in anticipation of the arrival of Schomberg in Astraea from Port Louis, to whom he had sent an urgent message the night before. As the British fell back towards Île Ronde off the northeastern shore of Mauritius, Roquebert declined to follow them through the dangerous gap between Île Ronde and Île du Serpent and instead sailed southwards, escaping before Hillyar and Schomberg could join up. Although Losack, supported by many crew members on board both Phoebe and Galatea, remonstrated with Hillyar for not pursuing the French, the British commander could not be persuaded and Roquebert slipped away. The British retired to Port Louis, arriving on 12 May.

Roquebert's squadron sailed westwards towards Bourbon, initially planning to raid the eastern coast of island for food supplies, as his own were running low. Although the British garrison in the eastern part of the island was weak, the plan was thwarted by heavy surf on the landing beaches and Roquebert continued eastwards on half rations, reaching Tamatave in Madagascar on 19 May. The British garrison at Tamatave, 100 men of the 22nd Regiment of Foot, were afflicted with malaria and surrendered without contesting the town, where the French squadron gathered water and food supplies.

When Hillyar's squadron arrived at Port Louis, Captain Schomberg immediately assumed command and led the squadron out again on 14 May, following the French eastwards. Heading straight for Tamatave, the only resupply point between Bourbon and the Cape of Good Hope, Schomberg rapidly gained on the French and when dawn broke on 20 May the French were within sight of the harbour. During the day, both commanders were frustrated by light winds and periods of calm in which none of the ships were able to move. Roquebert completed resupplying his ships at 12:00 and pulled away from the harbour in battle line, Clorinde followed by Renommée and Néréide while the British, although initially intending to form a line with Astraea at its head, gradually broke into a loose formation created by the vagaries of the wind.

== Battle ==
Action off Tamatave, 20 May 1811

Firing began at 16:00, when Renommée attempted to engage Astraea at extreme range. The British returned fire, Phoebe and Galatea joining the attack as they advanced, but the long distances and slow speeds involved meant that little damage was caused by either side. The British squadron gradually drifted beyond the range of the French, Schomberg desperately but unsuccessfully attempting to turn back towards them. With the British becalmed, Roquebert's ships began to close the distance, using the breeze to position their broadsides close to the sterns of the British ships. From this position the French were able to unleash a destructive raking fire, Clorinde concentrating on Phoebe and Renommée on Galatea. The rearmost ship, Néréide, was unable to manoeuvre successfully in the light winds and remained beyond the effective range of Astraea and Racehorse, despite an ineffectual cannonade in her direction.

Over the next two hours, Néréide advanced on Phoebe, sandwiching the British frigate between two opponents and exposing her to a destructive fire. Both squadrons had been rendered immobile by the lack of wind, and although Schomberg ordered de Rippe to use boats to tow Racehorse within range of the main engagement, the brig was still over a mile away at 18:30, when the breeze picked up and Hillyar was able to advance on Néréide, engaging her at close quarters. Stranded by light winds, Renommée and Clorinde were unable to come to Lemaresquier's assistance and in half an hour Phoebe had killed Captain Lemaresquier and inflicted such severe damage on her opponent that Néréide could no longer return fire. As Phoebe and Néréide fought, the becalmed Renommée and Clorinde concentrated their fire on Galatea, causing severe damage to Losack's vessel. As the breeze strengthened at 19:00, Renommée and Clorinde advanced on Phoebe, Losack firing on the French as they pulled away before steering his battered ship westwards and informing Schomberg that the damage was such that he could not continue in action. Continuing to the west with his rigging and masts in disarray and a distress signal flying, Losack's ship disappeared into the growing darkness at 20:30. Phoebe fell back before the French attack and joined Schomberg.

With the wind strengthening, Schomberg marshalled his forces and advanced on Roquebert's squadron. The French were clustered together in support of Néréide, whose crew were attempting to make hasty repairs while the squadron limped in a northwesterly direction towards Madagascar. Following the French lights, Schomberg pursued the French in the darkness and when Clorinde lost a man overboard and stopped to rescue him at 21:50, Roquebert was forced to fall back and protect his consort from being overwhelmed. Steering Renommée directly at Astraea, Roquebert opened fire at close range but was soon surrounded, with Astraea on one side, Racehorse on the other and Phoebe raking her stern. In a ferocious 25 minute engagement, Roquebert was killed and the French flagship suffered severe damage, surrendering after a shot from Racehorse ignited her mainsail. The British ships were also badly damaged: Racehorse was unable to launch a boat to take possession of Renommée due to a fallen topmast on her deck, and Astraea's boats were all badly damaged by shot and leaked severely during the short row to the stricken French vessel.

== Surrender at Tamatave ==
During the final battle of the Renommée, Saint-Cricq in Clorinde had remained out of range of the British, refusing to support his commodore. When Renommée surrendered, he made all sail to the north, abandoning both Roquebert and Néréide in his attempt to escape. Although Clorinde was closely pursued by Astraea and Phoebe until 02:00 on 21 May, the damage they had suffered prevented them from gaining on the French ship and Clorinde eventually disappeared into the darkness. During the night Schomberg gathered Phoebe, Racehorse and Astraea, and rejoined Renommée at dawn on 21 May. A prize crew of seven men was sufficient to exercise control over the French frigate until Schomberg could remove most of the French crew and replace them with British sailors the following morning. Although Galatea was still within sight at dawn, Losack was unsure of the identity of the approaching squadron and decided to sail directly to Port Louis rather than risk combat with a superior enemy force.

While making repairs to his ships, particularly the battered Phoebe, and transferring prisoners from Renommée, Schomberg despatched Racehorse to Tamatave to investigate the situation at the port. De Rippe returned on 24 May and informed Schomberg that Néréide was in the harbour and the town was in the hands of a French garrison. Despite sailing directly to Tamatave, Schomberg's ships were delayed by a gale and did not arrive until the afternoon of 25 May. Aware that no one in the British squadron had intimate knowledge of the coral reefs that surrounded the entrance to the bay and thus that he was poorly positioned to attack the French if they chose to resist him, Schomberg sent Racehorse into the harbour under a flag of truce. De Rippe presented the French commander, Lieutenant François Ponée, with a demand for surrender, the demand falsely stating that "Renommée and Clorinde have struck after a brave defence". Ponée refused, instead proposing that the ship's crew and the garrison of Tamatave be repatriated to France without conditions if the frigate, town and a 12-gun battery were surrendered to Schomberg's squadron. Schomberg accepted Ponée's proposal and Tamatave and Néréide were surrendered without further conflict.

== Aftermath ==
Clorinde had been almost undamaged in the battle and comfortably outran all British pursuit. Without a safe harbour in the entire Indian Ocean, Saint-Criq initially sailed for the Seychelles, hiding among the islands until 7 June. On 26 June, Clorinde landed at Diego Garcia and collected fresh water and coconuts before beginning the return journey to France in defiance of the orders to continue on to Batavia issued before the convoy left Brest. On 1 August, Clorinde passed the Cape of Good Hope, Saint-Criq supplementing his provisions by raiding British and American merchant ships in the Atlantic. On 24 September, Clorinde encountered the British blockade squadron off Brest and was chased by the 80-gun ship of the line HMS Tonnant under Captain Sir John Gore. Although Tonnant came close enough to Clorinde to discharge her broadside at the frigate, Gore was unable to catch the elusive French ship and was eventually forced to retire to open waters after coming under fire from batteries at Pointe Trépassée. By 17:00, Clorinde was anchored in Brest harbour. Saint-Criq was heavily criticised for his failure to support Roquebert and for ignoring his orders to sail to Batavia if Isle de France had been captured. In March 1812, he was brought to a court martial to examine his behaviour and found to have been negligent in his duty, for which he was dismissed from the service, expelled from the legion of Honour and sentenced to three years' imprisonment. Napoleon is reported to have suggested that Saint-Criq be shot for deserting his commanding officer.

There were also recriminations among the British squadron, Schomberg praising Astraea and Phoebe but omitting Racehorse and Galatea from the recommendations in his post-battle report. Captain Losack was particularly offended as Schomberg had implied that Galatea's distress signal was an overreaction in the face of the enemy, despite her casualties being greater than the rest of the squadron combined. (Note: Lieutenant Hugh Peregrine of the Royal Marines and 15 men were either killed or mortally wounded; Captain Losack, Lieutenant Thomas Bevis, Lieutenant Henry Lewis, midshipmen Henry Williams and Alexander Henning, 21 men and 3 boys were all wounded.) He subsequently requested a court martial to clear any suggestion of cowardice from his name but the Admiralty refused, commenting that they were fully satisfied with his conduct. Historian William James claims that opinion within the Navy was also with Losack and that Schomberg had been excessively harsh in his criticism.

Due to the variable winds of 20 May, some ships were more heavily engaged than others and as a result the casualties in the action were unevenly spread. According to the French account of the battle, Renommée suffered 93 killed and wounded, including Commodore Roquebert dead and the first lieutenant and commander of the troops on board both badly wounded, although British accounts give a figure of 145 casualties. The French accounts also demonstrate that Néréide had suffered severely, losing 25 dead including Captain Lemaresquier and 32 wounded (again the British accounts differ, stating that she suffered 130 casualties). Clorinde, which had caused severe damage to Galatea while the British ship was immobile but had failed to support Renommée against Schomberg, lost just one man killed and six wounded. British losses were less severe, although still significant, Galatea losing 16 and 46 wounded, Phoebe seven dead and 24 wounded and Astraea two dead and 16 wounded. Racehorse, despite being badly damaged in her masts and rigging, reportedly suffered no casualties.

The captured ships were both purchased into the Royal Navy and recommissioned, Renommée becoming HMS Java and Néréide becoming HMS Madagascar. Nearly four decades later the battle was among the actions recognised by a clasp attached to the Naval General Service Medal, awarded upon application to all British participants still living in 1847. The action marked the end of the final French attempt to operate in the Indian Ocean during the Napoleonic Wars: with their bases now in British hands, any deployment to the region would require a significant quantity of ships and supplies at a time when France was unable to even protect the entrances to her principal harbours, as Clorinde's brush with Tonnant had demonstrated. The action also ended the threat to British merchant ships, especially the large East Indiamen, from attack in the Indian Ocean and the requirement for a significant Royal Navy presence in the region. With the exception of a few small Dutch ports in the East Indies, the world east of the Cape of Good Hope was now either under British control or in the hands of neutral powers and Britain's allies.

== Order of battle ==
Captain Schomberg's squadron
Ship	Rate	Guns	Navy	Commander	Casualties			Notes
Ship	Rate	Guns	Navy	Commander	Killed	Wounded	Total	Notes
HMS Astraea	Fifth rate	36		Captain Charles Marsh Schomberg	2	16	18	
HMS Racehorse	Sixth rate	20		Captain James de Rippe	0	0	0	
HMS Phoebe	Fifth rate	36		Captain James Hillyar	7	24	31	
HMS Galatea	Fifth rate	36		Captain Woodley Losack	16	46	62	
Casualties: 25 killed, 86 wounded, 111 total

Commodore Roquebert's squadron
Ship	Rate	Guns	Navy	Commander	Casualties			Notes
Ship	Rate	Guns	Navy	Commander	Killed	Wounded	Total	Notes
Clorinde	Fifth rate	40	France	Captain Jacques de Saint-Cricq	1	6	7	Escaped. Reached Brest on 24 September.
Renommée	Fifth rate	40	France	Commodore Dominique Roquebert †	–	–	93	Captured on 20 May. Commissioned into the Royal Navy as HMS Java.
Néréide	Fifth rate	40	France	Captain Jean-François Lemaresquier †	24	32	56	Captured at Tamatave on 25 May. Commissioned into the Royal Navy as HMS Madagascar.
Note: British and French accounts of French casualties were significantly different, the British accounts reporting 145 casualties on Renommée and 130 on Néréide.
Casualties: 156 killed or wounded
Sources: James, pp. 20–21, Clowes, p. 486.

Key

- A † symbol indicates that the officer was killed during the action or subsequently died of wounds received.
- The ships are ordered in the sequence in which they formed up for battle.
- = British Royal Navy, = French Navy.
