= Spanish brig Infante =

History

Spain
- Name: Infante
- Builder: Cádiz
- Launched: 1787
- Captured: By the French Navy in December 1793

France
- Name: Infante
- Renamed: Liberté (January 1794); Infante (May 1795); Salamine (10 May 1798)
- Captured: June 1799

Great Britain
- Name: HMS Salamine
- Acquired: By capture June 1799
- Honours and awards: Naval General Service Medal (NGSM) with clasp "Egypt"
- Fate: Sold 1802

General characteristics
- Type: 18-gun brig
- Displacement: 350 tons
- Tons burthen: 240 (bm)
- Length: 93 ft 6 in (28.50 m) (overall); 79 ft 0 in (24.08 m) (keel)
- Beam: 28 ft 8 in (8.74 m)
- Depth of hold: 10 ft 0 in (3.05 m)
- Complement: Originally: 95–112 At capture: 120 British service: 86 in British service
- Armament: 18 × 6-pounder guns

Salamine was originally the Spanish Navy's Infante 18-gun brig, built in 1787 at Cádiz. The French Navy captured her at Toulon in December 1793 and recommissioned her; they renamed her on 10 May 1798 as Salamine, for the battle of Salamis. On 18 June 1799, HMS Emerald captured her and she was brought into Royal Navy service as HMS Salamine. She served briefly in the Mediterranean, where she captured two French privateers and several merchant vessels before the Royal Navy sold her at Malta in 1802, after the Treaty of Amiens ended the war with France.

== French service ==
The French navy captured the Spanish brig Infante in December 1793, and brought into French service under her existing name. In January 1794, she was recommissioned in Toulon under Lieutenant Girardias, and renamed Liberté. In May 1795, she was returned to her original name of Infante.

In June 1797, Infante sailed together with the frigates Sensible and Artémise to seize Venetian ships; the prizes included the frigates Muiron and Carrère.

On 10 May 1798, she was renamed to Salamine. As part of the fleet of Toulon, Salamine participated in the Mediterranean campaign of 1798.

During the Battle of the Nile, she took refuge under the forts of Abukir, and formed up with Rear-admiral Villeneuve's squadron, which comprised the two 74-gun Guillaume Tell and Généreux, and the frigates Diane and Justice. Villeneuve then entrusted Salamine with the report of the battle for General Bonaparte, before sailing to Malta with his four ships.

On 8 May 1799, Salamine encountered the xebec HMS Fortune, under the command of Lieutenant Lewis Davis, and her consort HMS Dame de Grace. (Note: Fortune was originally the British privateer Fortunatus, which Justice captured in December 1797. The French commissioned Fortunatus as an 18-gun xebec; before Salamine recaptured her, she had been captured by HMS Swiftsure, and taken back into British service as a polacre of 10 guns.) Salamine and Fortune exchanged fire for two hours until Fortune had expended all her ammunition, had three guns dismounted, and had had two men killed and four wounded. Then Salamine also recaptured the Dame de Grace. This was the Vierge de Graces, which Commodore Sir Sidney Smith in Tigre captured when he took a flotilla of seven vessels at Acre on 18 March 1799. Salamine took out her crew and scuttled Dame de Grace.

Under Lieutenant Landry Salamine was part of the Syrian naval station under Rear-admiral Perrée. She ferried artillery and ammunition to the French Army besieging Acre. Sidney Smith's squadron chased Perrée's division, but it evaded him and sailed for Toulon.

Sixty miles off Toulon, on 17 June, Perrée's division met Lord Keith's fleet, who dispatched a force consisting of three 74-gun ships and two frigates, all under Captain John Markham, to intercept it.

In weak winds, a 28-hour chase began, and the French division dispersed. By the evening of the 18th, Alerte was racing ahead, Salamine following three miles behind, and the French frigates four miles further behind her. At 19:00, the British 74-guns had subdued the frigates and Markham's force started chasing the two remaining brigs. The frigate HMS Emerald eventually caught up with Salamine, which struck to her much stronger opponent. The entire British squadron, not just the vessels under Markham's command, shared in the prize money.

At the time of her capture, Salamine was under the command of "Sandry, Lieutenant", presumably a misprint for "Landry".

== British service ==
The Royal Navy commissioned Salamine in January 1800 under Commander Thomas Briggs. He immediately took her out on patrol off the coast of Spain and France.

Her first prize was actually a share in a prize. On 29 March, Salamine was among the ships that shared in the capture of the Courageux. The other captors were Renown, Dragon, Gibraltar, Haerlem, Alexander, Athenian, Mercury, and Salamine.

On 9 April Salamine captured a Genoese settee that was sailing from Languedoc to Nolle [sic] with a cargo of wine. (This may have been the Madona del Fortuno.) Then two days later Salamine captured the French tartan, the Madona de Montenero, which was carrying salt fish, sugar, and similar cargo.

The next month, on 3 May, Salamine captured the Swedish brig Waragtigheten, which was sailing from Benicarló to Leghorn with a cargo of wine. (Note: The date of capture was later corrected to 3 May from March, and the master's name was given as Wallenstein.) About six weeks later, on 14 June, Salamine and Cameleon captured the Genoese brig Anima Purgatoria, which was sailing from Bastia to Saleolight [sic].

On 20 August Salamine captured an unnamed French privateer of four guns, six swivel guns, and 56 men. Then on the day after Christmas, Salamine and the frigate Caroline captured the French brig Good Friends, which was carrying a particularly militarily useful cargo of 28 brass long guns, five brass mortars, and shot and shell from Leghorn to Marseilles.

A little more than three weeks later, on 21 January 1801, Caroline and Salamine captured another French privateer, or judging from her crew size, more properly, a letter of marque. This was a xebec of four 6-pounder guns and 24 men. She was sailing from Leghorn to Egypt carrying arms and ammunition.

Salamine served off Egypt between 8 March and 2 September. She is listed amongst the vessels whose crews qualified for the NGSM with clasp "Egypt". Commander Alexander Campbell replaced Briggs in July, though Briggs is the captain named in the medal list. (Briggs had been promoted to post captain on 24 July and into command of the Fourth rate, HMS Madras, her captain having died that month.)

== Fate ==
Salamine was paid off in July 1802. She was sold off later that year at Malta for £1,280.
