= HMS Nisus =

Frigate of the Royal Navy

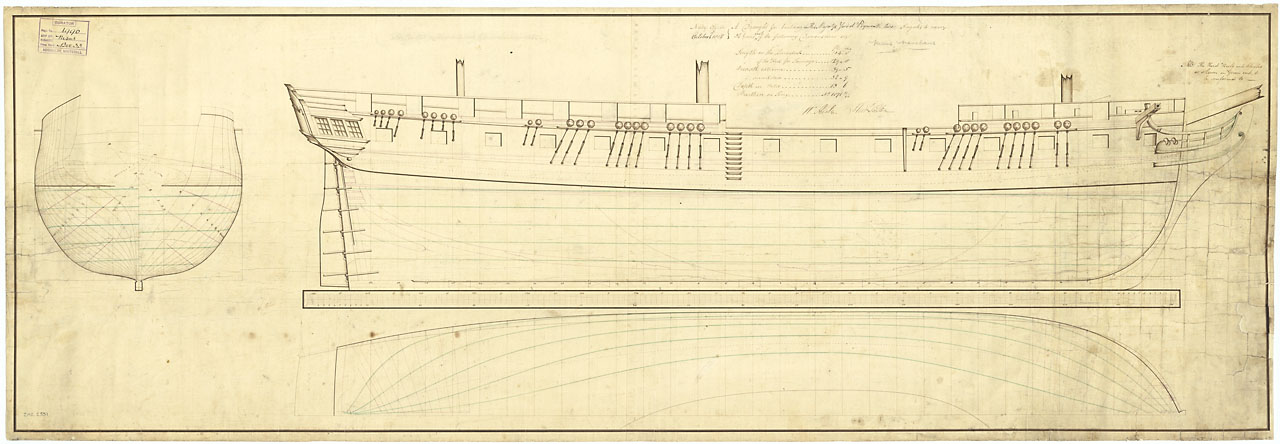
- Nisus

History

United Kingdom
- Name: HMS Nisus
- Namesake: Nisus
- Ordered: 28 September 1808
- Builder: Plymouth Dockyard
- Laid down: December 1808
- Launched: 3 April 1810
- Completed: 15 June 1810
- Fate: Broken up, September 1822

General characteristics
- Class & type: Lively-class frigate
- Tons burthen: 1,071 51/94 tons bm
- Length: 154 ft (47 m)
- Beam: 39 ft 5 in (12.01 m)
- Draught: 13 ft 6 in (4.11 m)
- Propulsion: Sail
- Sail plan: Full-rigged ship
- Complement: 284
- Armament: As ordered: UD: 28 × 18-pounder guns; QD: 2 × 9-pounder guns + 12 × 32-pounder carronades; FC: 2 × 9-pounder guns + 2 × 32-pounder carronades

HMS Nisus was a Royal Navy 38-gun fifth rate frigate, launched in 1810 at Plymouth, named for Virgil's character Nisus from The Aeneid.

Nisus entered service in 1810 under the command of Captain Philip Beaver, and sailed for the Indian Ocean, where she participated in the squadron led by Admiral Albemarle Bertie which landed troops on Île de France and captured the island from the French in December 1810. (Note: The Admiral's share of the prize money was £2650 5s 2d. A first-class share was worth £278 19s 5 3/4d; a sixth-class share, that of an ordinary seaman, was worth £3 7s 6 1/4d. A fourth and final payment was made in July 1828. A first-class share was worth £29 19s 5 1/4d; a sixth-class share was worth 8s 2 1/2d. This time, Bertie received £314 14s 3 1/2d.)

By agreement, Eclipse and Nisus shared in the prize money for the capture of the Renommée on 20 May 1811 at the Battle of Tamatave, and one week later of the Néréide. In August 1811, Nisus supported the Invasion of Java and was involved in a successful attack on the French fortified port of Cheribon, seizing the fort and defeating a French army sent to drive the British off. In September the force captured Surabaya.

In 1814 command passed to Charles Marsh Schomberg and in 1815 she was laid up at Plymouth, prior to being broken up in 1822.
