= HMS Racehorse (1806) =

British naval brig-sloop (1806–1822)

- Racehorse

History

United Kingdom
- Name: HMS Racehorse
- Ordered: 7 November 1803
- Builder: Hamilton & Breed, Hastings
- Laid down: June 1804
- Launched: 17 February 1806
- Honours and awards: Naval General Service Medal; "Off Tamatave 20 May 1811"
- Fate: Wrecked on 14 December 1822

General characteristics
- Class & type: Cruizer-class brig-sloop
- Tons burthen: 385 bm
- Length: 100 ft 1 1/2 in (30.5 m) (gundeck); 77 ft 4 1/4 in (23.6 m) (keel)
- Beam: 30 ft 7 1/4 in (9.3 m)
- Depth of hold: 12 ft 9 in (3.9 m)
- Sail plan: Brig rigged
- Complement: 121
- Armament: 16 × 32-pounder carronades + 2 × 6-pounder bow guns

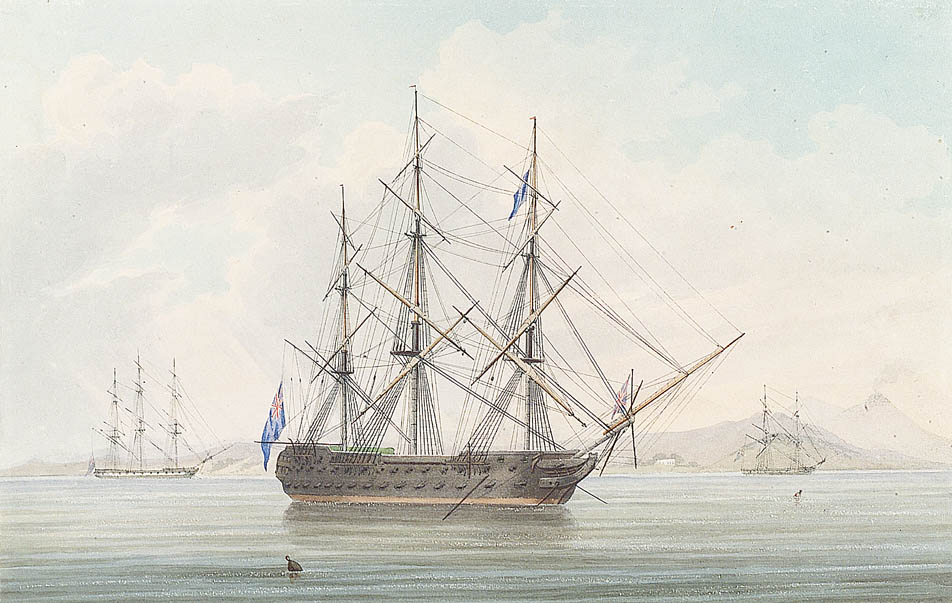
HMS Revolutionnaire, HMS Rochefort and HMS Race Horse during the internment of Sir Thomas Freemantle on 22 December 1819, at Baia Bay, Naples

HMS Racehorse was a Royal Navy 18-gun Cruizer-class brig-sloop built by Hamilton & Breeds and launched in 1806 at Hastings. She served in the English Channel, where she captured a small privateer, and in the East Indies, where she participated in the capture of Isle de France (now Mauritius) and the operations around it. She was wrecked in 1822.

== Service ==
Racehorse was commissioned in March 1806 under Commander Robert Forbes, who sailed her for the Mediterranean on 25 May. By June 1807 she was under Captain William Fisher, cruising in the Channel.

Racehorse was among the vessels that detained the Danish ships Die Twende Softre on 28 August, and Swannen on 7 September. On 4 December she recaptured the Portuguese ship Gloria. (Note: A petty officer's share of the salvage was worth £21 5s 3d; a seaman's share was worth £6 8s 0¼d.) On 2 March 1808 Racehorse captured the French privateer lugger Amiral Gantheaume off the Seven Islands, which are 16 miles west of Behat. Amiral Gantheume was armed with four guns and had a crew of 28 men. She was two days out of Granville and had not taken anything. Racehorse then cruised the Channel Islands.

Fisher sailed for the Cape of Good Hope on 29 September. There a number of her crew volunteered aboard other ships during the Invasion of Ile de France. On 13 and 14 March 1809, Racehorse was in company with her class-mate, Harrier, about 1000 miles from Rodrigues. Harrier fell behind and this was the last sighting of her; she was lost, presumed foundered.

In December 1810, Commander James de Rippe replaced Fisher. Racehorse was sent to Mauritius to join the squadron there under James Hillyar that had been assembled to attack the French squadron under Francois Roquebert that was expected from Brest. Early in 1811 Racehorse was in company with her sister-ship Elipse when Eclipse recaptured the Donna Emilia. On 3 February, Racehorse captured the slaver Othmany. (Note: In December 1815 a payment was made from the sum of £600 from the bounty money for the slaves on Othmany, the amount having been reserved for the expense of appeals. A first-class share was worth £100; a sixth-class share was worth 18s 1½d.)

The French squadron evaded Hillyar, but Racehorse and the rest of the squadron, now under Captain Charles Marsh Schomberg, caught them off Tamatave in Madagascar. In the ensuing Action of 20 May 1811, the British defeated the French and captured two of their ships. Racehorse was not heavily engaged, and suffered no casualties. In 1847 the Admiralty authorized the issuance of the Naval General Service Medal with clasp "Off Tamatave 20 May 1811" to the remaining survivors of that action.

Racehorse was present at the capture of the Néréide three days later. (Note: Racehorse was among the vessels that shared in the proceeds of a payment in January 1818 of £4000 on account for the capture of Renommeée and Nereide. A first-class share was worth £98 19s 0d; a sixth-class share was worth £1 3s 1½d.) Racehorse then sailed for the Cape on 7 August. On 19 September she and Astraea captured the French slaver brig Eclair. (Note: A first-class share of the bounty money for the slaves was worth £154 9s 9d; a sixth-class share, that of an ordinary seaman, was worth £1 2s 8d. A first-class share of a subsequent payment for the hull and stores was worth £105 7s 6d; a sixth-class share was worth 15s 5½d.)

On 5 January 1812 Eclipse, with Racehorse in company, took the lugger Eliza with 145 slaves, which she sent to the Cape of Good Hope. (Note: A first-class share of the bounty money for the slaves was worth £295 1s 2½d; a sixth-class share was worth £7 7s 6¼d.) Racehorse captured the American ship Monticello on 12 November. (Note: A first-class share of the prize money was worth £1169 1s 4d; a sixth-class share, that of an ordinary seaman, was worth £23 17s 3d. A first-class share of a later payment from an excess charge withheld at the Cape of Good Hope for Monticello and Valentine was worth £16 5s 0¼d; a sixth-class share was worth 3s 9¾d.) Racehorse also shared in the proceeds of the capture, on 16 November, of Valentine. (Note: A first-class share was worth £437 8s 5½d; a sixth-class share was worth £3 7s 11½d.) On 3 February 1813, Racehorse was under the command of Commander George F. Rich, and in company with Harpy, under the command of Commander Samuel Hoare. They captured the American ship Rose, which was carrying tea and 8907 Spanish dollars (worth approximately £2226). (Note: A first-class share of the proceeds of 121 chests and 160 boxes of tea was worth £58 8s 8d; a sixth-class share was worth £1 7s 10d. A first-class share of the dollars was worth £495 16s 10d; a sixth-class share was worth £12 11s 0d.)

On 15 August 1813 Racehorse sailed from the Cape of Good Hope as escort to several vessels, including Rambler bound for St Helena and Britain.

== Post-war ==
Racehorse was paid off into ordinary at Portsmouth in 1813. She was recommissioned in May under Commander George Pryse Campbell, who took command on 5 May, for the Mediterranean. Racehorse came under the command of Commander Charles Abbot on 27 January 1821 when Campbell was promoted to post-captain.

== Fate ==
Racehorse returned to Britain in 1822 under Captain William Suckling, who had taken command in February 1822. On 14 December 1822 she sailed from Holyhead, Anglesey, bound for the Isle of Man to meet with the Revenue cutter Vigilant. That night she was wrecked on a reef of rocks off Langness on the Isle of Man. Her pilot mistook the light on Langness Pier for the light on Douglas Pier. Boats from Racehorse took a number of the crew to shore, and five intrepid local men made four trips out and back to rescue more. On the last trip, with Suckling on board, the boat overturned in the surf. Six men from Racehorse drowned, as did three rescuers from Castletown.

The subsequent court martial reprimanded the Master, Henry Hodder, for failing to take constant depth soundings, and warned him to be more careful in the future. The court martial severely reprimanded the pilot, William Edwards, for sailing too close to land, and mulcted him of all pay due.

There is a detailed account of the loss of the Racehorse in Janet Gleeson's book The Lifeboat Baronet - Launching the R.N.L.I. Whilst the author indicates that RNLI founder Sir William Hillary was not present at this particular event, living elsewhere on the Isle of Man, she argues that the shipwreck was undoubtedly a significant contributing factor to his desire to set up a national lifesaving organisation.
