= William Fisher (Royal Navy officer, born 1780) =

Rear-Admiral William Fisher
- Born: 18 November 1780
- Died: 30 September 1852 (aged 71); London
- Military career
- Allegiance: United Kingdom of Great Britain and Ireland
- Branch: Royal Navy
- Service years: 1795–1852
- Rank: Rear-Admiral
- Commands: HMS Racehorse; HMS Bann; HMS Cherub; HMS Asia
- Conflicts: French Revolutionary Wars; Campaign in Egypt and Syria; Napoleonic Wars; Trafalgar Campaign; Egyptian–Ottoman War

William Fisher (18 November 1780 – 30 September 1852), was an officer of the Royal Navy and a novelist.

Fisher was the second son of John Fisher and Martha Goate of Great Yarmouth, Norfolk, was born on 18 November 1780, and entered the navy in 1795. After serving in the North Sea, at the Cape of Good Hope, and in the Mediterranean, and as acting lieutenant of HMS Foudroyant on the coast of Egypt, he was confirmed in the rank on 3 September 1801. In 1805 he was lieutenant of HMS Superb during the chase of Pierre-Charles Villeneuve to the West Indies during the Trafalgar Campaign; and in 1806 was promoted to be commander. In 1808 he commanded the 18-gun HMS Racehorse in the English Channel, and in the same ship, in 1809–10, was employed in surveying off Mozambique. In March 1811 he was promoted to post-rank, and in 1816–17 commanded in succession the 20-gun ships HMS Bann and HMS Cherub on the coast of Guinea, in both of which he captured several slavers and pirates, some of them after a desperate resistance. About 1827 he demonstrated the use of quick-connect hoses for the purpose of watering ships. The system was soon adopted, and to this day, is in universal use for fire engines. From March 1836 to May 1841 he commanded HMS Asia in the Mediterranean, and in 1840, during the operations on the coast of Syria as part of the Egyptian–Ottoman War, was employed as senior officer of the detached squadron off Alexandria, with the task of keeping open the mail communication through Egypt. For this service he received the Turkish gold medal and diamond decoration. He had no further service afloat, but became, in due course, a rear-admiral in 1847.

During his retirement he wrote two novels : The Petrel, or Love on the Ocean, in 1850, which passed through three editions, and Ralph Rutherford, a Nautical Romance, in 1851. He died in London, on 30 September 1852. Of Fisher's novels, naval historian John Knox Laughton wrote "A man who had been so long in the navy during a very stirring period, who had surveyed the Mozambique, and captured slavers and pirates, had necessarily plenty of adventures at command, which scarcely needed the complications of improbable love stories to make them interesting; but the author had neither the constructive skill nor the literary talent necessary for writing a good novel, and his language throughout is exaggerated and stilted to the point of absurdity."

Fisher married, in 1810, Elizabeth, sister of Sir James Rivett-Carnac, governor of Bombay, by whom he had two children, a daughter and a son. By the son he was a grandfather of George Carnac Fisher, Bishop of Southampton and then Ipswich.
