= Apollo-class frigate =

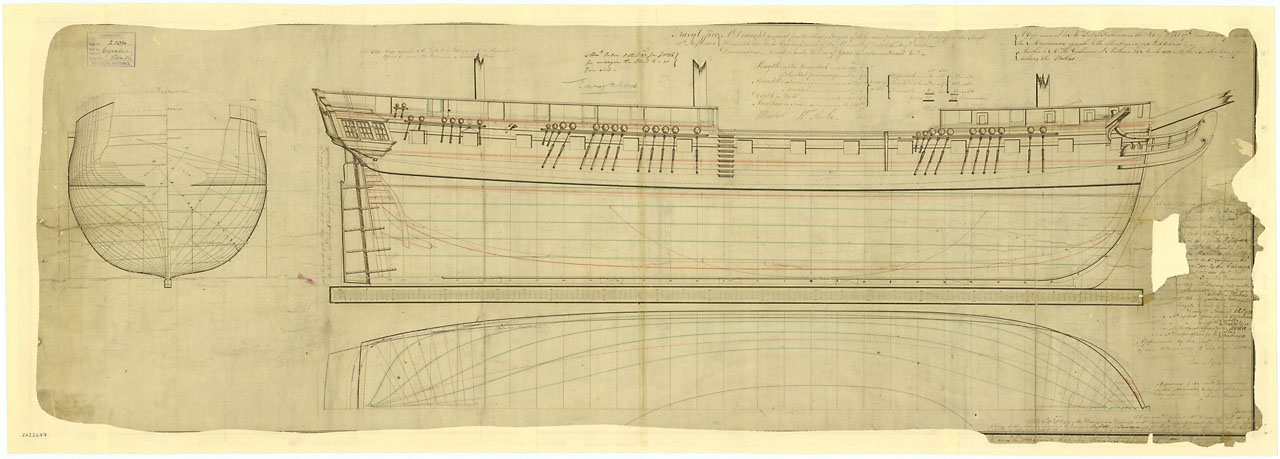
- Design of the class

Class overview
- Name: Apollo-class frigate
- Operators: Royal Navy
- Preceded by: Narcissus class
- Succeeded by: Aigle class
- Built: 1798–1819
- In service: 1799–1908
- Completed: 27
- Lost: 4

General characteristics
- Type: Fifth-rate frigate
- Tons burthen: 943 53/94 bm (as designed)
- Length: 145 ft (44 m) (gundeck); 121 ft 9.375 in (37.11893 m) (gundeck)
- Beam: 38 ft 2 in (11.63 m)
- Draught: 13 ft 3 in (4.04 m)
- Sail plan: Full-rigged ship
- Complement: 264
- Armament: UD: 26 × 18-pounder guns; QD: 2 × 9-pounder guns + 10 × 32-pounder carronades; FC: 2 × 9-pounder guns + 4 × 32-pounder carronades

The Apollo-class sailing frigates were a series of twenty-seven ships that the British Admiralty commissioned be built to a 1798 design by Sir William Rule. Twenty-five served in the Royal Navy during the Napoleonic Wars, two being launched too late.

Of the 25 ships that served during the Napoleonic Wars, only one was lost to enemy action. Of the entire class of 27 ships, only two were lost to wrecking, and none to foundering.

The Admiralty ordered three frigates in 1798–1800. Following the Peace of Amiens, it ordered a further twenty-four sister-ships to the same design between 1803 and 1812. The last was ordered to a fresh 38-gun design. Initially, the Admiralty split the order for the 24 vessels equally between its yards and commercial yards, but two commercial yards failed to perform and the Admiralty transferred these orders to its own dockyards, making the split 14–10 as between the Admiralty and commercial yards.

== Ships in class ==
- HMS Apollo
  - Builder: John Dudman, Deptford Wharf
  - Ordered: 15 September 1798
  - Laid down: November 1798
  - Launched: 16 August 1799
  - Completed: 5 October 1799 at Deptford Dockyard
  - Fate: Wrecked off Portugal on 2 April 1804.
- HMS Blanche
  - Builder: John Dudman, Deptford Wharf
  - Ordered: 18 January 1799
  - Laid down: February 1800
  - Launched: 2 October 1800
  - Completed: 17 January 1801 at Deptford Dockyard.
  - Fate: Captured and burnt by the French 19 July 1805.
- HMS Euryalus
  - Builder: Balthazar and Edward Adams, Bucklers Hard.
  - Ordered: 16 August 1800
  - Laid down: October 1801
  - Launched: 6 June 1803
  - Completed: 9 August 1803 at Portsmouth Dockyard.
  - Fate: Sold to be broken up 16 August 1860 at Gibraltar.
- HMS Dartmouth
  - Builder: Mr Cook, Dartmouth (originally Benjamin Tanner, at same yard, but he became bankrupt in February 1807)
  - Ordered: 17 March 1803 originally; re-ordered 2 June 1809
  - Laid down: July 1804
  - Launched: 28 August 1813
  - Completed: 20 September 1813 at Plymouth Dockyard
  - Fate: Hulked 1830 for quarantine service. Broken up November 1854.
- HMS Creole
  - Builder: Plymouth Dockyard (originally Benjamin Tanner, but he became bankrupt in February 1807)
  - Ordered: 17 March 1803 originally; re-ordered 23 December 1810
  - Laid down: September 1811
  - Launched: 1 May 1813
  - Completed: 20 August 1813 at Plymouth Dockyard
  - Fate: Broken up August 1833.
- HMS Semiramis
  - Builder: Deptford Dockyard
  - Ordered: 25 March 1806
  - Laid down: April 1807
  - Launched: 25 July 1808
  - Completed: 6 September 1808
  - Fate: Broken up November 1844.
- HMS Owen Glendower
  - Builder: Thomas Steemson, Paull (near Hull)
  - Ordered: 1 October 1806
  - Laid down: January 1807
  - Launched: 19 November 1808
  - Completed: 22 March 1809 at Chatham Dockyard
  - Fate: Prison ship 1842; sold for break-up 1884.
- HMS Curacoa
  - Builder: Robert Guillaume, Northam (Southampton)
  - Ordered: 1 October 1806
  - Laid down: January 1808
  - Launched: 23 September 1809
  - Completed: 23 January 1810 at Portsmouth Dockyard
  - Fate: Cut down into 24-gun sixth rate 1831. Broken up March 1849.
- HMS Saldanha
  - Builder: Simon Temple, South Shields
  - Ordered: 1 October 1806
  - Laid down: March 1807
  - Launched: 8 December 1809
  - Completed: 1810
  - Fate: Lost at sea with her entire crew 4 December 1811.
- HMS Hotspur
  - Builder: George Parsons, Warsash
  - Ordered: 1 October 1806
  - Laid down: August 1807
  - Launched: 13 October 1810
  - Completed: 9 February 1811 at Portsmouth Dockyard
  - Fate: Broken up January 1821.
- HMS Havannah
  - Builder: Wilson and Company, Liverpool
  - Ordered: 1 October 1806
  - Laid down: March 1808
  - Launched: 26 March 1811
  - Completed: 29 July 1811 at Plymouth Dockyard
  - Fate: 1860 "Ragged School Ship", Cardiff; sold for breaking up in 1905.
- HMS Malacca
  - Builder: "Prince of Wales Island" (Penang), Malaya
  - Ordered: 19 February 1807
  - Laid down: February 1808
  - Launched: 6 March 1809
  - Completed: 28 October 1810 at Woolwich Dockyard
  - Fate: Broken up in March 1816.
- HMS Orpheus
  - Builder: Deptford Dockyard
  - Ordered: 27 February 1808
  - Laid down: August 1808
  - Launched: 12 August 1809
  - Completed: 21 September 1809.
  - Fate: Broken up at Chatham Dockyard in August 1819.
- HMS Leda
  - Builder: Woolwich Dockyard
  - Ordered: 23 March 1808
  - Laid down: October 1808
  - Launched: 9 November 1809
  - Completed: 8 December 1809.
  - Fate: Sold to be broken up on 30 April 1817.
- HMS Theban
  - Builder: George Parsons, Warsash
  - Ordered: May 1808
  - Laid down: June 1808
  - Launched: 22 December 1809
  - Completed: 25 April 1810 at Portsmouth Dockyard.
  - Fate: Broken up at Plymouth Dockyard in May 1817.
- HMS Manilla
  - Builder: Woolwich Dockyard
  - Ordered: 29 December 1806
  - Laid down: October 1807
  - Launched: 11 September 1809
  - Completed: 18 October 1809.
  - Fate: Wrecked 28 January 1812
- HMS Astraea
  - Builder: Robert Guillaume, Northam (Southampton)
  - Ordered: 26 September 1808
  - Laid down: December 1808
  - Launched: May 1810
  - Completed: 24 September 1810 at Portsmouth Dockyard.
  - Fate: Broken up at Plymouth Dockyard in April 1851.
- HMS Belvidera
  - Builder: Deptford Dockyard
  - Ordered: 28 September 1808
  - Laid down: December 1808
  - Launched: 23 December 1809
  - Completed: 16 February 1810.
  - Fate: Sold to be broken up in July 1906.
- HMS Galatea
  - Builder: Deptford Dockyard
  - Ordered: 12 May 1809
  - Laid down: August 1809
  - Launched: 31 August 1810
  - Completed: 18 October 1810.
  - Fate: Hulked in 1836; coal hulk (Jamaica) in 1840; broken up in 1849.
- HMS Maidstone
  - Builder: Deptford Dockyard
  - Ordered: 8 January 1810
  - Laid down: September 1810
  - Launched: 18 October 1811
  - Completed: 13 December 1811.
  - Fate: Coal hulk 1838. Broken up in January 1867.
- HMS Stag
  - Builder: Deptford Dockyard
  - Ordered: 17 October 1810
  - Laid down: January 1811
  - Launched: 26 September 1812
  - Completed: November 1812.
  - Fate: Broken up in September 1821.
- HMS Magicienne
  - Builder: Daniel List, Binstead, Isle of Wight
  - Ordered: 14 December 1810
  - Laid down: April 1811
  - Launched: 8 August 1812
  - Completed: 24 October 1812 at Portsmouth Dockyard.
  - Fate: Broken up in March 1845.
- HMS Pallas
  - Builder: Portsmouth Dockyard (originally Robert Guillaume, Northam, Southampton, but he became bankrupt in 1813)
  - Ordered: 19 March 1811 originally; re-ordered 10 December 1813
  - Laid down: May 1811 by Guillaume; re-laid April 1814 at Portsmouth
  - Launched: 13 April 1816
  - Completed: 27 April 1816 at Portsmouth Dockyard.
  - Fate: Sold to be broken up on 11 January 1862.
- HMS Barrosa
  - Builder: Deptford Dockyard
  - Ordered: 4 April 1811
  - Laid down: October 1811
  - Launched: 21 October 1812
  - Completed: 10 December 1812.
  - Fate: Sold to be broken up on 27 May 1841.
- HMS Tartar
  - Builder: Deptford Dockyard
  - Ordered: 6 January 1812
  - Laid down: October 1812
  - Launched: 6 April 1814
  - Completed: 6 May 1814.
  - Fate: Broken up in September 1859.
- HMS Brilliant
  - Builder: Deptford Dockyard
  - Ordered: 11 December 1812
  - Laid down: November 1813
  - Launched: 28 December 1814
  - Completed: 5 March 1815.
  - Fate: Training ship 1860, renamed Briton 8 November 1889. Sold to be broken up on 12 May 1908.
- HMS Blonde – re-ordered to a radically new design from 1816.
  - Builder: Deptford Dockyard
  - Ordered: 11 December 1812
  - Laid down: March 1816
  - Launched: 12 January 1819
  - Completed: 1824.
  - Fate: Receiving ship in November 1850, renamed Calypso on 9 March 1870. Sold to be broken up on 28 February 1895.
