= Vierge-de-Grâce =

18th century navel vessel

History

France
- Name: Vierge-de-Grâce or Dame de Grace
- Acquired: April 1798
- Captured: 19 March 1799

Great Britain
- Name: HMS Dame de Grace
- Acquired: 19 March 1799 by capture
- Captured: 8 May 1799 and scuttled

General characteristics
- Tons burthen: RN:87 (bm); France:90 (French; "of load")
- Sail plan: Brig
- Armament: 4 guns

Vierge-de-Grâce (or Dame de Grace), was a merchant vessel that the French Navy requisitioned in 1798, for use as a transport. The Royal Navy captured her in March 1799, and took her into service as HMS Dame-de-Grace. The French corvette Salamine captured her on 8 May 1799, and scuttled her.

Vierge-de-Grâce was one of a flotilla of seven vessels that Commodore Sir Sidney Smith in HMS Tigre took at Acre on 18 March 1799, all of which the British took into service. At capture Vierge-de-Grâce carried four guns and had a crew of 35 men. ( See also List of gun-vessels Commodore Sir Sidney Smith captured at Acre in March 1799.)

The flotilla of gun-vessels had left Damietta with siege artillery and other siege supplies to reinforce Napoleon's troops besieging Acre. Smith immediately put the guns and supplies to use to help the city's defenders resist the French, and the gun-vessels to harass them.

On 8 May 1799, the xebec HMS Fortune, under the command of Lieutenant Lewis Davis, and Dame de Grace encountered Salamine. (Note: Fortune was originally the British privateer Fortunatus, which Justice captured in December 1797. The French commissioned Fortunatus as an 18-gun xebec; before Salamine recaptured her, she had been captured by HMS Swiftsure, and taken back into British service as a polacre of 10 guns.) Salamine and Fortune exchanged fire for two hours until Fortune struck, after she had expended all her ammunition, had three guns dismounted, and had two men killed and four wounded. Then Salamine also recaptured Dame de Grace. Salamine took out Dame de Grace's crew and scuttled her.
