= HMS Java (1811) =

British Royal navy frigate

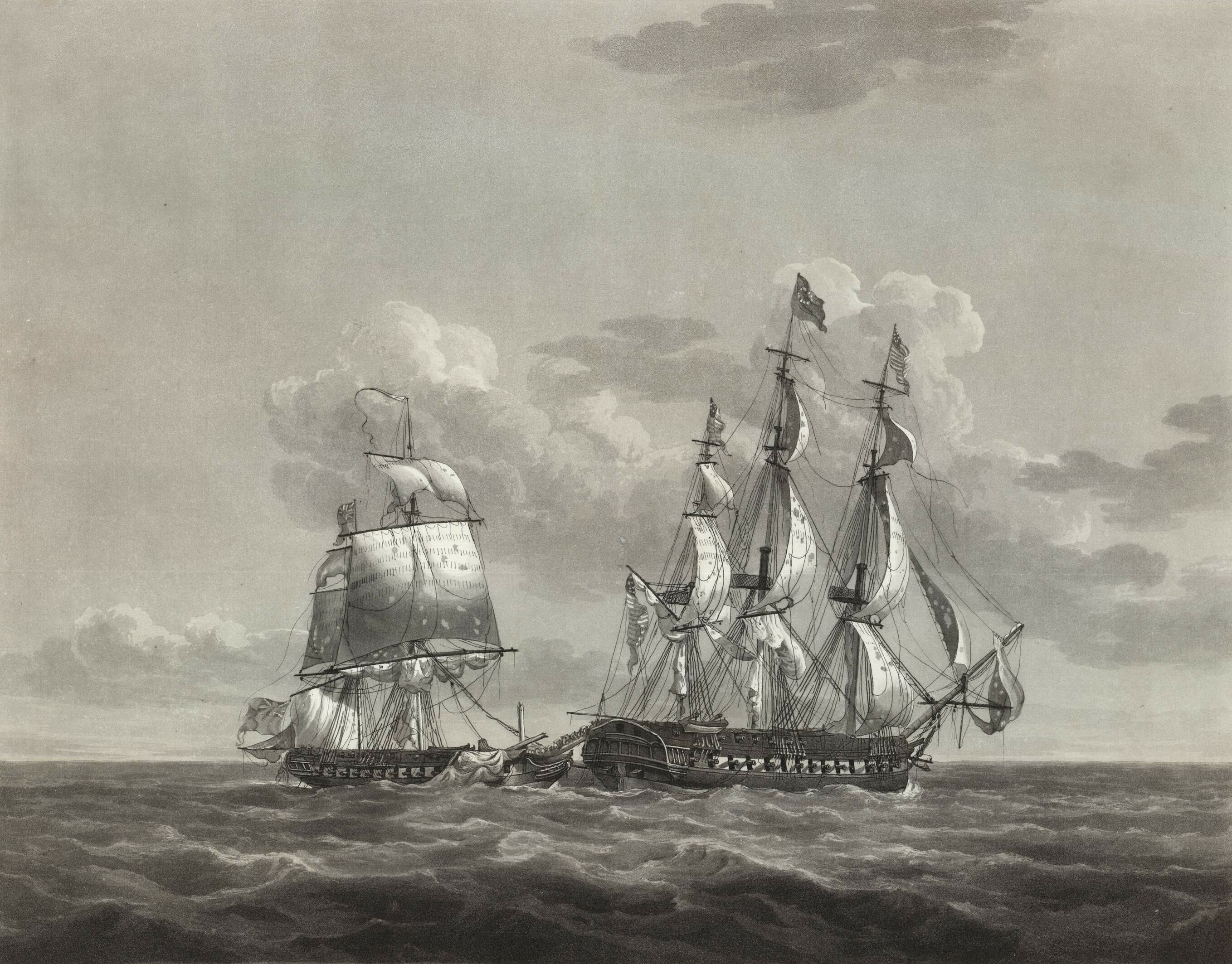
- The capture of HMS Java by USS Constitution, drawn by Nicholas Pocock

History

France
- Name: Renommée
- Ordered: 26 March 1805
- Builder: Mathurin & Antoine Crucy, Basse-Indre Nantes
- Laid down: October 1805
- Launched: 20 August 1808
- Captured: 20 May 1811

United Kingdom
- Name: HMS Java
- Acquired: 20 May 1811
- In service: May 1811
- Captured: 29 December 1812
- Fate: Burnt on 1 January 1813

General characteristics
- Class & type: Pallas-class fifth-rate frigate
- Tons burthen: 1073 41/94 (bm)
- Length: 152 ft 5 1/2 in (46.5 m) (gundeck); 126 ft 5 1/2 in (38.5 m) (keel)
- Beam: 39 ft 11 3/8 in (12.2 m)
- Depth of hold: 12 ft 9 in (3.9 m)
- Sail plan: Full-rigged ship
- Complement: 397
- Armament: 28 × 18-pounder guns; 2 × 12-pounder guns; 18 × 32-pounder carronades; 1 × 24-pounder carronade

HMS Java was a British Royal Navy 38-gun fifth-rate frigate. She was originally laid down in 1805 as Renommée, described as a 40-gun Pallas-class French Navy frigate, but the vessel actually carried 46 guns. The British captured her in 1811 in a noteworthy action during the Battle of Tamatave, but she is most famous for her defeat on 29 December 1812 in a three-hour single-ship action against USS Constitution. Java had a complement of about 277, but during her engagement with Constitution she had 426 aboard, in comparison with her opponent's 475.

== French service ==
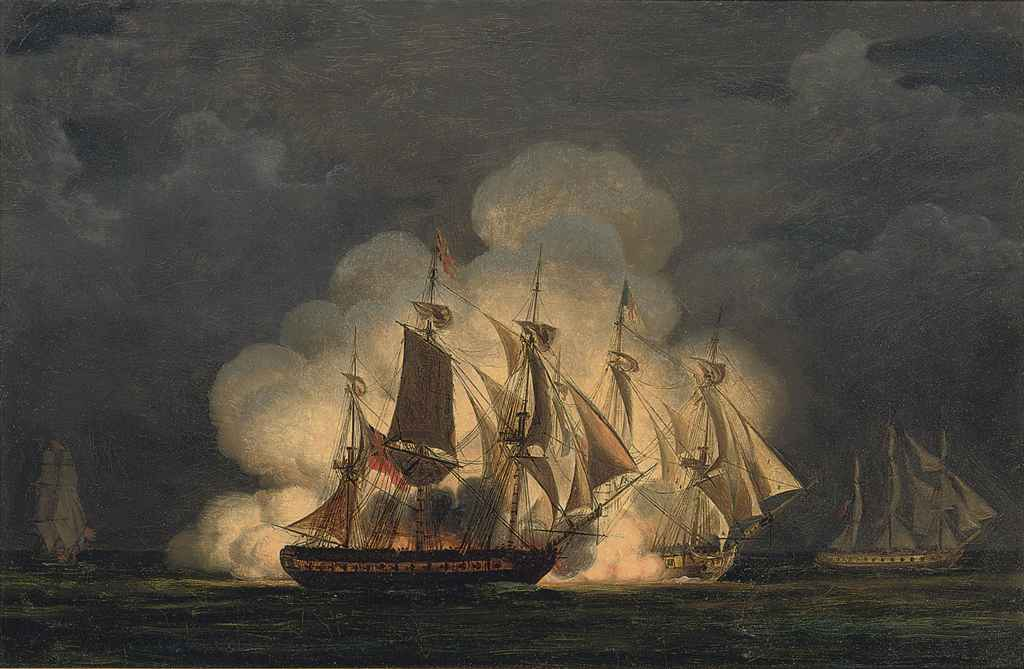
A naval engagement at night, an action between HMS Junon and the French frigates Renommée and Clorinde, 13 December 1809

In May 1811, she was part of a three-sail squadron under François Roquebert, comprising Renommée, Clorinde and Néréide, and ferrying troops to Mauritius. On 20 May, the French encountered a British squadron comprising Astraea, Phoebe, Galatea, and Racehorse. In the ensuing Battle of Tamatave, Renommée struck after her mainsail was set on fire. The British captured Néréide five days later at Tamatave, Madagascar. Clorinde, commanded by Jacques de Saint-Cricq, escaped. The British brought Renommée into service as Java and Néréide as Madagascar.

== Royal Navy service ==
In July Java was under Captain William Gordon, but not commissioned until August under Captain Henry Lambert, a senior commander who had seen combat on a number of occasions in His Majesty's service.

Java sailed from Portsmouth on 12 November for Bombay to deliver the appointed governor, Lieutenant-General Sir Thomas Hislop, and his staff with their baggage, and naval stores (including copper plates for the under-construction Cornwallis, at Bombay, and plans for the new ship, Trincomalee). She was carrying additional personnel for other ships at the time and included another Royal Navy commander in transit.

=== Capture by USS Constitution ===
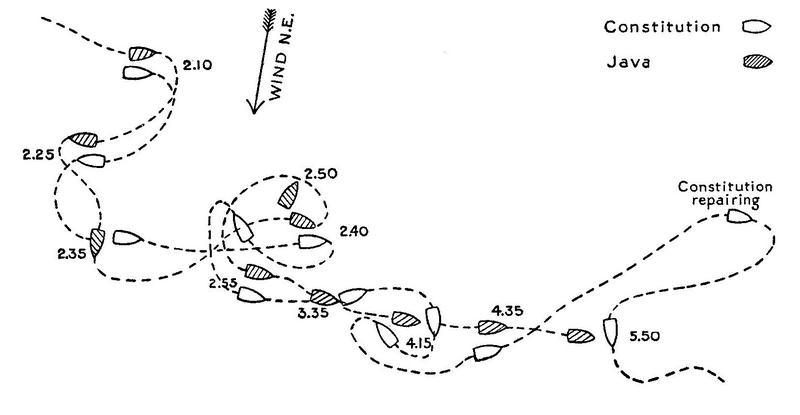
Diagram of the battle between USS Constitution and HMS Java

Captain Lambert of Java was a well-qualified officer, having seen much combat during his service. Java had more than a full crew, having been rounded out while in Portsmouth, but many were landsmen still raw to service at sea, and even more damning to her cause, they had only practised gunnery once, and that without shot loaded in the guns. Still, Java was well supplied and manned, and would prove to be well handled and well fought. USS Constitution had an experienced crew manning a heavy frigate carrying 54 cannon: thirty 24-pounder guns and twenty-four 32-pounder carronades, plus two 24-pounder bow chasers.

On 13 December 1812, sailing from Boston by way of Cape Verde, USS Constitution, under the command of Captain William Bainbridge, accompanied by USS Hornet, commanded by James Lawrence, arrived off the coast of Brazil at St. Salvador. On 26 December Hornet was sent into the port to communicate with the American consul stationed there. On 29 December at 9:00 a.m., still out at high sea in search of prizes, crewmen aloft Constitution sighted strange sails on the distant horizon. Bainbridge initially was unsure of the disposition of the ships, but hours later as they drew closer he was able to discern that the approaching vessels were large and now assumed them to be British. To ascertain the disposition of the unidentified ships Constitution hoisted private signals (flags) at 11:30 a.m., while the assumed British vessel also hoisted its signals, but neither ship made the correct counter-signal.

Constitution, tacking the wind, made her way from the neutral Portuguese territorial waters with Java giving chase. At 12:30 p.m. that day Java hoisted her colors and ensign with Constitution hoisting her colors in reply. With the dispositions of each ship confirmed, Java, with the weather gauge to her advantage, came about to position herself to rake Constitution. Being French-built, she was comparatively light for a frigate and was consequently faster and more maneuverable than Constitution. (Note: Roosevelt draws on the primary sources of the Logbook of the Constitution, Chad's address to the Court-martial, 23 April 1813, Commodore Bainbridge's letters, testimony of Christopher Speedy at Chad's Court-martial, naval surgeon J. C. Jones' report.) In reply Constitution fired a shot across Java's bow with Java returning fire with a full broadside.

Java started the battle badly out-matched both in terms of the experience of her crew and the weight of her broadside. Constitution, with her experienced commander and crew, countered by not shortening sail as was standard (this reduced strain on the masts, thus making it less likely to lose a mast under fire). By 2:00 p.m., both ships were heading southeast. The opening phase of the action comprised both ships turning to and fro, attempting to get the better position for which to fire upon and rake the other, but with little success. Bainbridge now wore Constitution to a matching course and opened fire with a broadside at half a mile. This broadside accomplished nothing and forced Bainbridge to risk raking to close Java. Another broadside from Java carried away Constitution's helm, disabling her rudder and leaving Bainbridge severely wounded; however he still maintained command, refusing to sit out the battle. Both ships resumed firing broadsides but by now Java had a mast and sail falling over her starboard side that prevented most of her guns on that side from firing, which also prevented her from laying alongside Constitution. The guns that attempted to fire only managed to set the fallen sail and rigging ablaze.

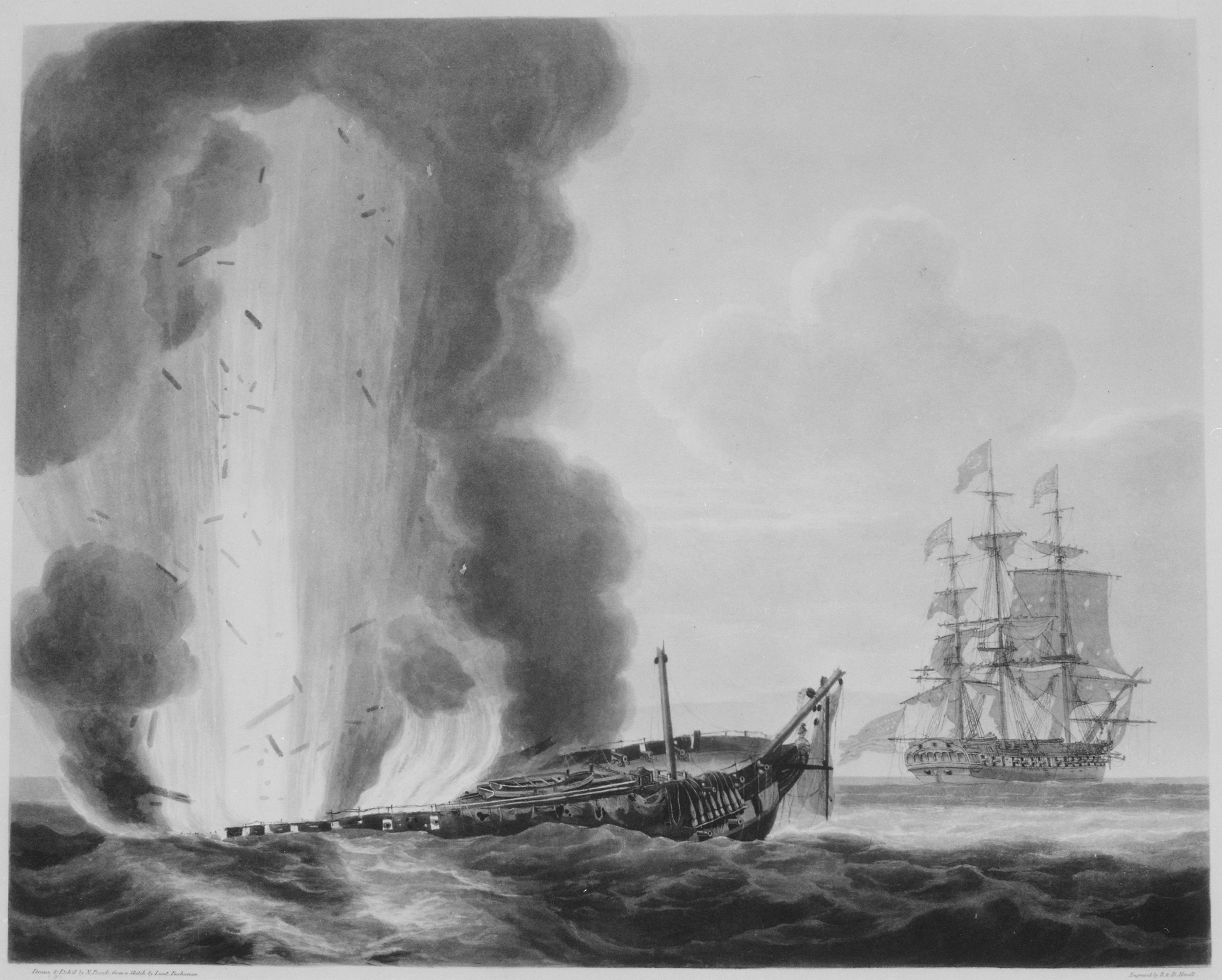
HMS Java exploding after being set ablaze

Constitution's accuracy of fire and the greater weight of her broadside put the much smaller Java at a large disadvantage. Within one hour, after several close encounters involving the rigging of each ship getting entangled with the other's, Java's masts collapsed. During this encounter a sharpshooter aloft in Constitution mortally wounded Lambert. Lieutenant Henry Ducie Chads now took over command, assisted by the captain in transit to his ship. Bainbridge used this opportunity to distance Constitution so as to make immediately-needed repairs, taking approximately an hour. Clearing the masts and fallen rigging aboard Java had hardly begun when Constitution returned from repairing her damage and immediately took a raking position from which Java could not defend herself. This left Lieutenant Chads no choice but to surrender Java. Constitution hoisted out a boat and sent First Lieutenant Parker to take possession of the prize.

In the battle, Java suffered 22 men killed, including Lambert, and 102 wounded. Constitution lost nine men initially and 57 wounded, including Bainbridge. Some four or five later succumbed to their wounds. (Note: Accounts of Constitution's casualties appear to vary. Roosevelt claims 12 killed and 22 wounded; Harris puts the numbers at nine killed and 25 wounded, with the number killed not taking into account three of the wounded who later died.)

In the course of battle Java was rendered a dismasted hulk that was not worth taking as a prize. Instead Bainbridge removed her helm and installed it on Constitution, replacing the one that had been shot away. On New Year's Day 1813, two days after the engagement, Bainbridge gave the order to set Java ablaze; she subsequently blew up.

Upon learning of the death of Captain Lambert, Commodore Bainbridge expressed deep sorrow for a commander he credited to be brave and noble. On 23 April 1813, Lieutenant Chads and the other surviving officers and men of Java faced the customary court martial aboard HMS Gladiator for the loss of their ship. They were honourably acquitted.

== In fiction ==
The engagement between Java and Constitution was fictionalized in the novel The Fortune of War by Patrick O'Brian and in the novel Yankee Mission by Julian Stockwin.

== See also ==
- Bibliography of early United States naval history
- Glossary of nautical terms (A–L)
- Glossary of nautical terms (M–Z)
- List of early warships of the English navy
- List of ship names of the Royal Navy
- Sailing ship tactics
- List of ships captured in the 19th century

== Bibliography ==
- Cooper, James Fenimore (1856). History of the Navy of the United States of America. New York: Stringer & Townsend. OCLC 197401914.
- Dudley, William S.; Crawford, Michael J., eds. (1985). The Naval War of 1812: A Documentary History. Contributor: Hughes, Christine F. Naval Historical Center, Department of Navy. pp. 639–772. ISBN 978-1-780-39364-3.
- Harris, Thomas (1837). The Life and Services of Commodore William Bainbridge, United States Navy. Philadelphia: Carey Lea & Blanchard. p. 254. ISBN 978-0-795-00485-8.
- Hollis, Ira Nelson (1900). The Frigate Constitution The Central Figure of the Navy Under Sail. Boston; New York; Cambridge, UK: Houghton, Mifflin and Company, The Riverside Press. p. 263.
- "Naval History of the Present Year, 1813 (February—March) Retrospective and Miscellaneous". Naval Chronicle. Vol. 29. Joyce Gold. pp. 402–408.
- Roosevelt, Theodore (1883). The Naval War of 1812. New York: G. P. Putnam's Sons. p. 541. ISBN 0-945-72658-9.
- Winfield, Rif (2008). British Warships in the Age of Sail, 1793–1817: Design, Construction, Careers and Fates. Seaforth Publishing. ISBN 978-1-861-76246-7.
