= HMS Madras (1795) =

British ship of the line (1795–1807)

History

Great Britain
- Name: Lascelles
- Builder: Wells & Co. Rotherhithe
- Launched: 4 July 1795
- Renamed: HMS Madras
- Honours and awards: Naval General Service Medal with clasp "Egypt"
- Fate: Sold 1807 already partially dismantled

General characteristics
- Tons burthen: 142585/94 (bm)
- Length: Overall: 175 ft 1 1/2 in (53.4 m); Keel: 144 ft 0 in (43.9 m)
- Beam: 43 ft 1 3/4 in (13.2 m)
- Depth of hold: 17 ft 6 in (5.3 m)
- Sail plan: Sloop
- Complement: 344
- Armament: Upper deck (UD): 28 × 32-pounder carronades; Lower deck (LD): 28 × 18-pounder guns

HMS Madras was laid down as Lascelles, an East Indiaman being built for the British East India Company (EIC). The Royal Navy purchased her on the stocks and had her completed as a 56-gun fourth-rate. She was launched as HMS Madras in 1795, and served in the Leeward Islands and the Far East. In 1801, she was armed en flûte and served in the Mediterranean, first participating in the British campaign to drive Napoleon from Egypt. From 1803, she served as a guard ship at Malta and was broken up there in 1807.

== Career ==
Captain John Dilkes commissioned Madras in August 1795.

Her first major service occurred in 1795 when she joined Admiral Hugh Cloberry Christian's expedition to the West Indies, with troops under Lieutenant-General Sir Ralph Abercromby. She sailed on 25 February 1796 to invade St Lucia. The attack on St Lucia finally took place on 28 April. St Lucia surrendered to the British on 25 May. The British went on to capture Saint Vincent and Grenada.

Madras returned to Chatham in 1798 for refitting between September and December. In June 1799, she sailed for the Cape of Good Hope and Canton, where she arrived later that year. On 11 February 1800, she was involved in a minor incident in which a sentry on the schooner Providence, tender to Madras, fired on some Chinese men in a boat trying to cut Providence's cable. One man was wounded and one man drowned when he jumped into the water from the boat. The wounded man was taken aboard the East Indiaman Earl of Abergavenny for treatment. Eventually the Chinese authorities dropped the "Providence Affair".

Madras returned to England, arriving on 23 September 1800 having escorted 16 East Indiamen from Saint Helena, which they had left on 22 July. In January 1801, Captain Charles Hare sailed en flûte for the Mediterranean on the Expedition to Egypt. Hare died in July and his replacement was Captain Thomas Briggs, who had been promoted to post captain on 24 July into Madras from Salamine.

Because Madras served in the navy's Egyptian campaign between 8 March and 2 September 1801, her officers and crew qualified for the clasp "Egypt" to the Naval General Service Medal, which the Admiralty authorised in 1850 to all surviving claimants. (Note: A first-class share of the prize money awarded in April 1823 was worth £34 2s 4d; a fifth-class share, that of a seaman, was worth 3s 11½d. The amount was small as the total had to be shared between 79 vessels and the entire army contingent.)

Charles Marsh Schomberg received promotion to post captain on 6 August 1803 and took command of Madras, then serving as a guard ship at Malta. In February 1807, Madras served as a storeship in Admiral Sir John Thomas Duckworth's Dardanelles Operation. Madras was in the Rear or Third Division, commanded by Rear-Admiral Sir Sidney Smith. After Madras returned to Malta she was paid off and laid up at Valletta.

== Fate ==
Having suffered a magazine explosion, Madras was sold at Valletta in 1807 and broken up.
