= French ship Étoile =

At least 15 ships of the French Navy have borne the name Étoile ("Star"). Among them were:

- Étoile, a ship of the line of 1622. She was the first French ship to bear the name, and took part in the operations against La Rochelle in the battle of Saint-Martin-de-Ré on 26 October 1622.
- Étoile, a ship of 48 guns built in 1672 as the fireship Actif and renamed Étoile on 6 December 1675.
- Étoile, a frigate of 30 guns built in 1703.
- Étoile, a former fluyt built in 1762 which were adapted as a corvette by the French Navy and was part of the flotilla of Louis Antoine de Bougainville exploring the Pacific from 1767 to 1769.
- Étoile, a 44-gun frigate captured by Britain and recommissioned as HMS Topaze
- The present-day Étoile, a training sailship of the Navy
