= Order of the Crescent =

Chivalric order of the Ottoman Empire

Imperial Order of the Crescent نشانِ خلال
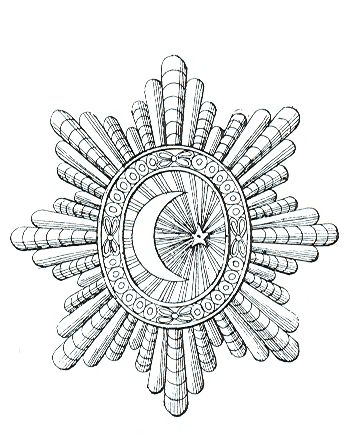
- The star of the Order of the Crescent of the Ottoman Empire
- Type: Order of Merit
- Awarded for: Military service
- Country: Ottoman Empire
- Presented by: Ottoman Sultan
- Eligibility: Non-muslims
- Status: No longer awarded
- Established: 1799
- Ribbon of the order

Nelson, by Lemuel Francis Abbott - his Order of the Crescent, circled, is here painted the right way up.

The Imperial Order of the Crescent (Ottoman Turkish: نشانِ خلال) was a chivalric order of the Ottoman Empire. Despite the name, Muslims were not eligible to be awarded it.

== History ==
The order was instituted in 1799 by Sultan Selim III when he wished to reward Horatio Nelson, an Anglican Christian, for his victory at the Battle of the Nile. None of the existing Ottoman orders could be awarded to non-Muslims, so Selim specially created the Order of the Crescent for Nelson, making him its first Knight and sending him the insignia in August 1799. (He also rewarded Nelson with the separate award of the chelengk.) The Order was then extended to reward further British military successes on land and sea against Napoleon's forces in Egypt and the Eastern Mediterranean in 1801.

Nelson was so proud of his award that he appended it to his name in the Articles of Capitulation with Denmark after the Battle of Copenhagen on 9 April 1801 (news of which appending so pleased the Sultan that he added a ribbon and gold medal to Nelson's star). However, the British Royal Warrant at the College of Arms allowing him to wear it is only dated 20 March 1802.

Recipients (usually naval or army officers or representatives of Britain or France, highly present in the region during the Napoleonic Wars) were awarded a lozenge-shaped silver radiant star, embroidered in silver thread on an azure background with a star and crescent in the centre, and a red ribbon, to be worn with the crescent to the star's left. The order had two degrees, Knight First Class and Knight Second Class: the First Class members wore the insignia like a scarf, with the badge appendant (hung from the collar), whilst Second Class knights wore a slightly smaller version with no star, jewelling or ornamentation and a narrower ribbon saltier-wise (on a diagonal ribbon from one shoulder to the opposite waist).

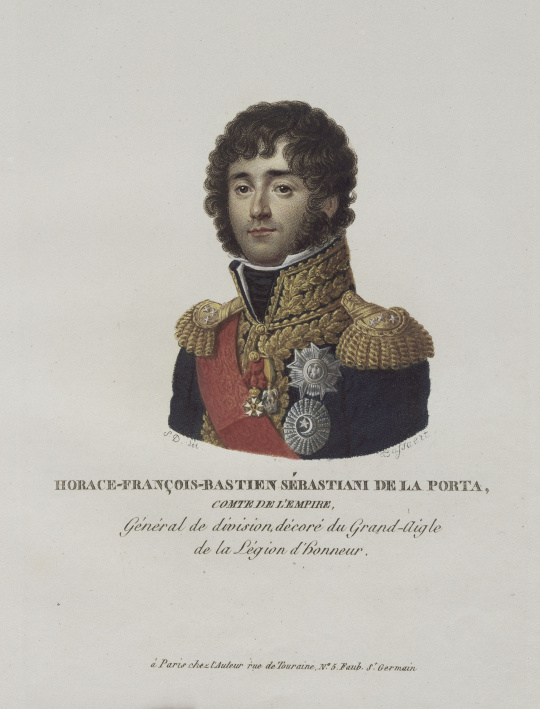
Sébastiani de La Porta with his star, the wrong way up.

British recipients sometimes used the postnominal letters KC.

== Recipients ==
- Horatio Nelson, Knight, 1799, by Selim III
- Thomas Staines, c. 1801, by Selim III
- Charles Marsh Schomberg, Knight, 1801, by Selim III
- Philip Beaver Captain of the Royal Navy 1801
- Lord Hutchinson, Knight Ist Class, by Selim III
- Major General Sir Eyre Coote, Knight Ist Class, by Selim III
- Lord Keith, Knight Ist Class, by Selim III
- Sir Richard Bickerton, Knight Ist Class, by Selim III
- Sébastiani de La Porta, Knight Ist Class, 1807, by Mustafa IV
- Sir William Houston, 1st Baronet, c.1801, Knight Second Class
- Armand Charles Guilleminot, Knight

== Sources ==
- Smyth, William Henry (1829). The life and services of captain Philip Beaver. Murray. p. 154. "Philip Beaver order of the crescent."
