= Philip Beaver =

Royal Navy officer (1766–1813)

Captain Philip Beaver
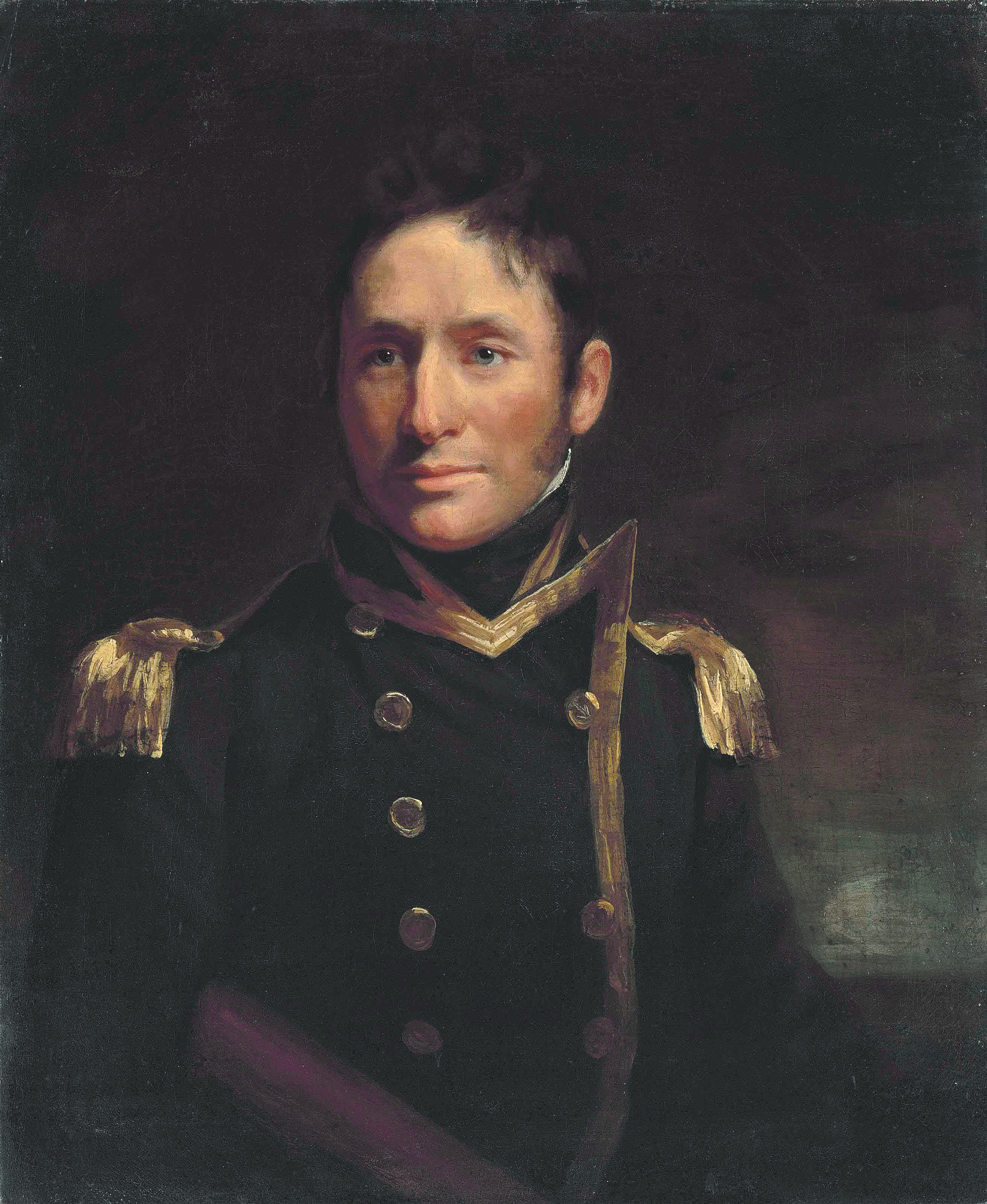
- 'Captain Philip Beaver RN' by John Opie
- Born: 28 February 1766; Lewknor, Oxfordshire
- Died: 5 April 1813 (aged 47); Aboard HMS Nisus, Table Bay, South Africa
- Military career
- Allegiance: Kingdom of Great Britain
- Branch: Royal Navy
- Service years: 1777 – 1813
- Rank: Captain
- Commands: HMS Barfleur; HMS Déterminée; HMS Acasta; HMS Nisus
- Conflicts: Battle of Ushant; Siege of Genoa; Invasion of Java
- Awards: Order of the Crescent

Philip Beaver (28 February 1766 – 5 April 1813) was an officer of the Royal Navy, serving during the late eighteenth and early nineteenth centuries. He played a varied and active role in several notable engagements, and served under a number of the most notable figures of the Navy of the age.

== Family and early life ==
Beaver was born in Lewknor, in Oxfordshire on 28 February 1766 to the Reverend James Beaver, curate of Lewknor. His father died when Philip was eleven, leaving the family impoverished. His mother accepted the offer of Joshua Rowley, then captain of HMS Monarch to take Philip to sea with him. Philip Beaver entered the Navy in October 1777, becoming midshipman aboard the Monarch during 1778. Whilst in this post, he witnessed the Battle of Ushant on 27 July 1778. He remained with Rowley and accompanied him when Rowley took command of HMS Suffolk in December 1778 and sailed her to the West Indies. Rowley was then appointed rear-admiral and hoisted his flag in a number of ships, including HMS Conqueror, HMS Terrible and HMS Princess Royal. Beaver followed him to each one, and in doing so served as part of fleets between 1779 and 1780 at times under the command of Admirals John Byron, Sir Hyde Parker and Sir George Rodney. His ship then came under the overall command of Sir Peter Parker at Jamaica, where Beaver spent the rest of the war. He was promoted to lieutenant by his patron, Admiral Rowley, on 2 June 1783. He spent the next ten years living with his mother at Boulogne. His naval service during this period was limited to a few months in 1790 and in 1791, during the mobilizations in response to the Spanish and the Russian armaments.

== Colonisation efforts ==
Beaver returned to a more active form of service in 1791 when he participated in a colonization scheme intended to resettle Black former slaves from the Americas with Richard Hancorn, commander of HMS Calypso, on the island of Bulama off the coast of Portuguese Guinea. He departed England on 14 April 1792, but the affair quickly ran into difficulties. The settlers were described as idle and dissipated. Beaver was in command of the Hankey, a small ship with sixty-five men, twenty-four women, and thirty-one children, mostly seasick and all useless. Even after their arrival, discipline was non-existent, and the directors of the project quickly lost heart and returned to England. Beaver was left in command and spent the next eighteen months attempting to make the settlement a success. Even with the failure of the colonization project, he is considered the founder and first administrator of British Guinea. Most of the colonists died, including Hancorn, and the remainder abandoned the colony in November 1793 and made their way to Settler Town in what later became the Colony of Sierra Leone. Beaver left too, and obtained passage back to England, arriving at Plymouth on 17 May 1794. He was later to publish an account of his experiences, entitled African Memoranda in 1805, which contained his thoughts, which were anti-slavery in nature.

== Rise through the ranks ==
By the time of his return, the French Revolutionary Wars had broken out and two months later Beaver was appointed as first lieutenant of the 64-gun HMS Stately, under Captain Billy Douglas. She set sail for the West Indies in March 1795, eventually meeting up with a squadron under Sir George Elphinstone. Elphinstone retained the Stately and used her as part of his conquest of the colony. Stately then sailed for the East Indies, and was involved in the capture of Ceylon. She was reunited with Elphinstone's force off Cape Agulhas on her return voyage. Beaver had by this time come to Elphinstone's attention, and he was impressed by Beaver's seamanship. Elphinstone subsequently moved Beaver onto his own ship, and the two returned to England in spring 1797.

By now first lieutenant of a flagship, Beaver looked forward to further promotion to his own command. He was to be disappointed however, by the time Elphinstone, by now Lord Keith, was appointed to command the Mediterranean Station a year later, Beaver had not received a promotion, and followed Keith as first lieutenant of the new flagship, HMS Foudroyant, later moving to HMS Barfleur. He appears to have clashed with the junior lieutenants under his command, as they seemed to him to be appointed for promotion rather than for duty. He brought Thomas Cochrane, then a junior lieutenant, to a court martial for disrespect. Cochrane was acquitted, but warned against flippancy. Beaver was told that the charge ought not to have been pressed. Beaver was made a commander on 19 June 1799, and Keith appointed him a few months later to serve aboard the flagship as acting assistant captain of the fleet. Beaver was placed in command of the bombardments as part of the Siege of Genoa in April and May 1800, and the allied forces eventually forced the surrender of the French commander André Masséna. He was sent home to England with the dispatches of the victory, but by the time he arrived the Battle of Marengo had been fought and Genoa had again fallen to the French. Beaver had hoped for a promotion after the victory, but this turn of events meant that it was not to be and he returned to Keith.

== First commands ==
He was detained at Gibraltar for a fortnight whilst making his return, and so took the opportunity to marry his young fiancée, Miss Elliott. He went on to rejoin Lord Keith, and was promoted to captain on 10 January 1801. He received the prestigious appointment to command the flagship, and took an active role in the operations on the coast of Egypt from 1800 to 1801. He quickly tired of the monotony of maintaining a blockade and obtained permission to take the frigate HMS Déterminée to Constantinople with dispatches. The Sultan wanted to acknowledge Beaver's services, and offered him a large sum of money, which Beaver refused. He did however accept a diamond box for himself and a gold box for each of the lieutenants. Beaver was also rewarded with the Order of the Crescent.

== Service in the West and East Indies ==
The Peace of Amiens temporarily ended the war with France, and Beaver and the Déterminée were ordered home. The Déterminée was paid off at Portsmouth on 19 May 1802, and Beaver was put in charge of the sea fencibles of Essex in July 1803. He was highly successful in these duties, and three years later returned to sea, having been appointed to command the 40-gun frigate HMS Acasta. He sailed her to La Guaira where captured the French corvette Serpent at command of Paul de Lemanon. Immediately Beaver traveled to Caracas, brought news of the Spanish uprising against the Napoleonic invasion and the formation of the Juntas in defense of the King Ferdinand VII wrights. In this manner the Venezuelans were informed about that a change of alliances had taken place until May 1808, Spain and France had fought together against England; from then on, England and Spain fought together against the French. Beaver remaining in the West Indies until the capture of Martinique in February 1809. He returned to England and after a few months, was appointed to command the 38-gun HMS Nisus, departing aboard her for the East Indies on 22 June 1810. He arrived on the station and joined the squadron under the command of Vice-Admiral Sir Albemarle Bertie. Beaver played a distinguished part in the capture of Mauritius in November 1810. Beaver and the Nisus then moved to a squadron under Rear-Admiral Robert Stopford and took part in the conquest of Java in August and September 1811. He spent nearly a year in Mozambique and off the coast of Madagascar, and received orders by the end of 1812 to return to England.

== Death ==
The Nisus was making her return voyage, when she put into Table Bay towards the end of March 1813. Beaver had complained of a slight indisposition previously, but became seized by a violent inflammation of the bowels. He spent a few days in excruciating pain, before dying on 5 April 1813. He had been a highly efficient and professional officer, and had attracted the patronage of highly placed and influential senior officers. He was widely read, and had read the entire Encyclopædia Britannica during one cruise. In common with many officers of the period, he was a strict disciplinarian, but was never charged with tyranny. His early death and the bankruptcy of his agent placed his family in financial difficulties, with his widow having to provide for six children. She became a matron of Greenwich Hospital school.
