= Jacques de Saint-Cricq =

French naval officer (1781–1819)

Jacques de Saint-Cricq (1781–1819) was a French sailor who took part in the Baudin expedition to Australia, leaving from Le Havre on 19 October 1800. An enseigne de vaisseau on board Naturaliste, the Cap Saint-Cricq was named after him.

After a council of war on 18 March 1812, by a majority of six against two, he was declared to blame for disobeying his commander's orders whilst commanding the frigate Clorinde, though not whilst in the presence of the enemy. He was condemned to have his sword broken, declared unworthy to serve, condemned unanimously to three years in prison and ejection from the Légion d'honneur. In the imperial decree of 30 March 1815 it was stated that this sentence was for not having taken part in the second engagement in which La Renommée surrendered and for having abandoned this frigate by a poor and irresolute manoeuvre. He was promoted back up to Capitaine de Vaisseau and to the rank which he had occupied in the navy lists, by ordnance of 21 April 1814, but on 30 March 1815 during the Hundred Days Bonaparte accepted his naval minister Denis Decrès's suggestion and issued an imperial decree which annulled the 1814 ordnance and confirmed the court martial's sentence.
