= James Hillyar =

Admiral Sir James Hillyar KCB KCH
- Born: 29 October 1769; Portsea, Portsmouth, Hampshire
- Died: 10 July 1843 (aged 73); Torpoint, Cornwall
- Military career
- Allegiance: United Kingdom
- Branch: Royal Navy
- Service years: 1780 to 1843
- Rank: Admiral
- Conflicts: American Revolutionary War; Capture of Magicienne; French Revolutionary Wars; Glorious First of June; Invasion of Egypt; Napoleonic Wars; Invasion of Ile de France; Battle of Tamatave; Invasion of Java; War of 1812; Capture of USS Essex
- Awards: Knight Commander of the Royal Guelphic Order; Knight Commander of the Order of the Bath

Admiral Sir James Hillyar KCB KCH (29 October 1769 – 10 July 1843) was a Royal Navy officer of the early nineteenth century, who is best known for his service in the frigate HMS Phoebe during the Napoleonic Wars and the War of 1812. While in command of Phoebe, Hillyar was present at the Invasion of Ile de France in 1810, was heavily engaged at the Battle of Tamatave in 1811 and captured the USS Essex off Valparaíso in Chile in 1814. In addition, Hillyar was engaged in numerous other operations, his first battle occurring in 1781 off Boston. He remained in the Navy until his death in 1843, and was active at sea during the 1830s, commanding fleets in the North Sea and off Portugal. He was knighted twice and two of his sons later became full admirals, Charles Farrell Hillyar and Henry Shank Hillyar.

His eldest daughter Mary Ann married January 1843 in Malta Sir Cecil Bisshopp, Bt of Parham in the County of Sussex.

== Life ==
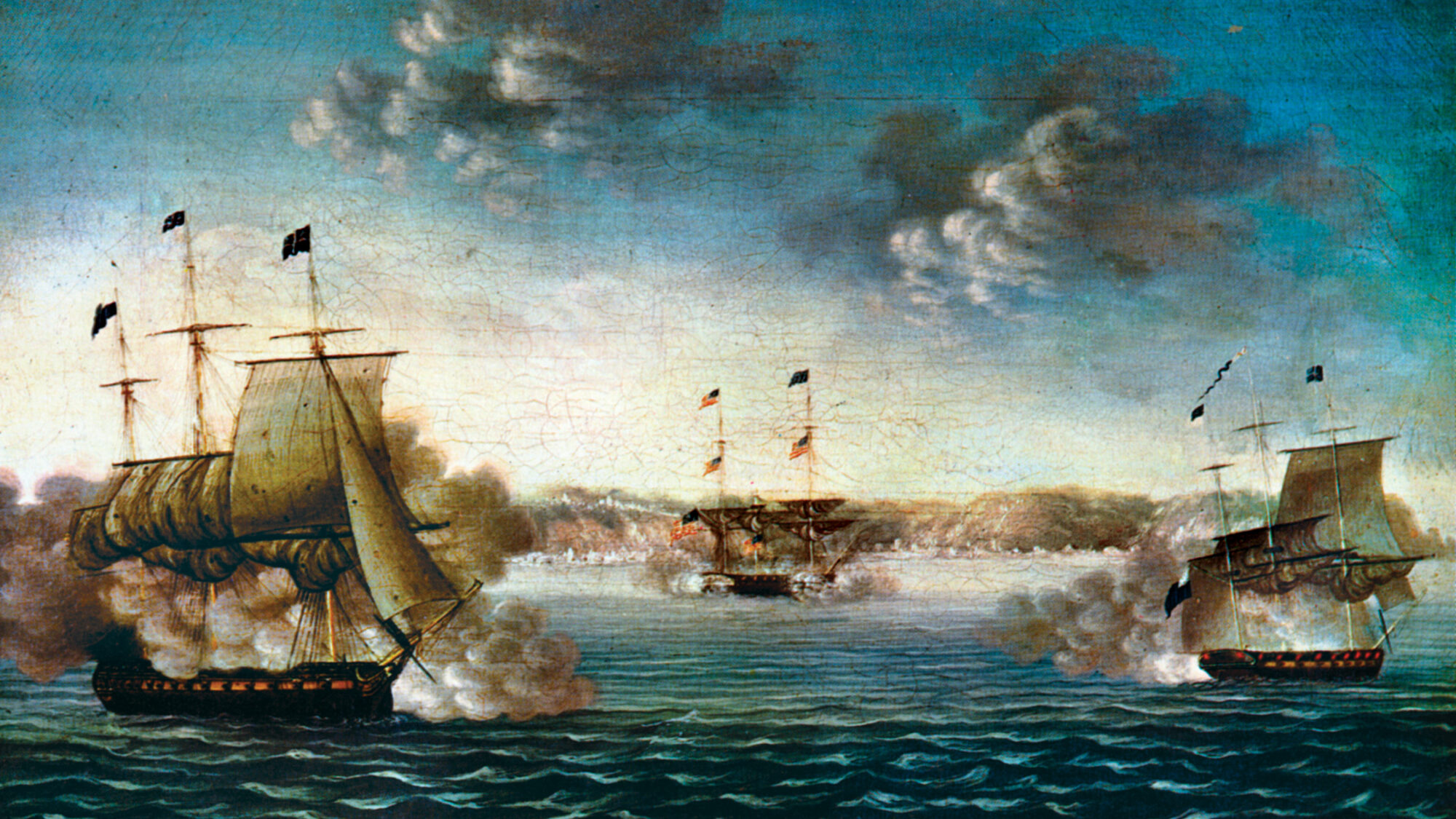
c. 1819 painting of the Battle of Valparaíso

Hillyar was born in 1769, son of naval surgeon James Hillyar, at Portsea, Portsmouth, Hampshire. He entered the Navy at just ten years old, serving aboard the frigate HMS Chatham during the American War of Independence. Chatham was employed on the blockade of Boston during the war, and 1781 fought a fierce action against the French frigate Magicienne, capturing the French ship, which was commissioned into the Royal Navy. Chatham was decommissioned in 1783 at the end of the war but Hillyar remained in service, principally on the North American Station, for the next ten years.

In 1793, at the outbreak of the French Revolutionary Wars, Hillyar was attached to HMS Britannia, the flagship of Lord Hotham in the Mediterranean. The following year he moved to Lord Hood's flagship HMS Victory and participated in the Siege of Toulon and the capture of Corsica, for which services he was promoted to lieutenant aboard HMS Aquilon under Captain Robert Stopford with the Channel Fleet. In Aquilon he was present at the Glorious First of June and subsequently moved with Stopford into the frigate HMS Phaeton, in which he remained until 1799, participating in Cornwallis' Retreat in 1794. In 1800, Stopford moved to the ship of the line HMS Excellent and Hillyar moved with him again, later taking command of the armed storeship HMS Niger. In Niger he attacked Spanish shipping off Barcelona and later operated as part of a boat squadron in Egypt during the British invasion of 1801 culminating in the siege of Cairo and the siege of Alexandria

In 1803, after the Peace of Amiens, Hillyar served in the Mediterranean in Niger, refusing herelovian promotion as it may have left him in reserve on half-pay, which would have left his family destitute. Horatio Nelson discovered this and especially recommended Hillyar for service to Lord St Vincent at the Admiralty. As a result, Hillyar was promoted and permitted to retain Niger, with increased armament, in the Mediterranean. In 1805 he married Mary Taylor, daughter of a Maltese naval storekeeper. In 1807 he joined the fleet preparing for operations in the Baltic Sea and in 1809 commanded the 98-gun HMS St George as flag captain for Eliab Harvey. The same year he was given another frigate for independent service, HMS Phoebe. Hillyar commanded Phoebe in the Indian Ocean and East Indies during 1810 and 1811, and was present at the Invasion of Ile de France and the subsequent invasion of Java. On 20 May 1811, he was one of the captains engaged at the Battle of Tamatave, when a French frigate squadron was defeated and two ships captured.

In 1813, Hillyar was appointed Commodore of the British Pacific Squadron and was ordered to operate in the Pacific Ocean against the American whaling fleets and fur trading posts. Off Chile, he discovered the American frigate USS Essex raiding British merchant ships and tracked her to the harbour of Valparaíso. Trapping Essex in the harbour, Hillyar waited six weeks for Essex to come out, thwarting all of the efforts of the American captain, David Porter to escape him. Eventually, on 28 March 1814, Porter attempted to break out of the harbour but was driven into a nearby bay and defeated in a short engagement. Hillyar brought Essex and her prizes back to Britain.

At the end of the Napoleonic Wars, Hillyar remained in the navy, and in 1830 was part of Edward Codrington's squadron in HMS Revenge and in 1832 was commander of the British squadron observing the French Siege of Antwerp. He later moved to the first rate HMS Caledonia and served off Portugal. In 1837 he was promoted to rear-admiral. Hillyar had been knighted in 1834, as a Knight Commander of the Royal Guelphic Order. In 1840 he was also made a Knight Commander of the Order of the Bath, advancing from the Companionship of the Order of the Bath he had received in 1815. He died in 1843 at his home in Tor House, Torpoint, Cornwall and was buried in Anthony churchyard. He was survived by his three sons, two of whom, Charles Farrell Hillyar and Henry Shank Hillyar, later became admirals in Royal Navy.
