= Dominique Roquebert =

French naval commander

Dominique Roquebert (French pronunciation: [dɔminik ʁɔkbɛʁ]; 1744–1811) was a French navy officer.

Trained at the École d’Hydrographie de Bayonne, Roquebert rose to the rank of captain in the French Navy. In December 1809, he led Roquebert's expedition to the Caribbean to Guadeloupe.

In 1811, Roquebert fought at the Battle of Tamatave, the last engagement of the Mauritius campaign of 1809–1811. He was killed on his flagship, Renommée, while covering the retreat of his squadron.

== Honours ==
A dock of Bayonne was named Quai du Commandant Roquebert in his honour.
