= Roquebert's expedition to the Caribbean =

1809 failed French supply run to Guadeloupe

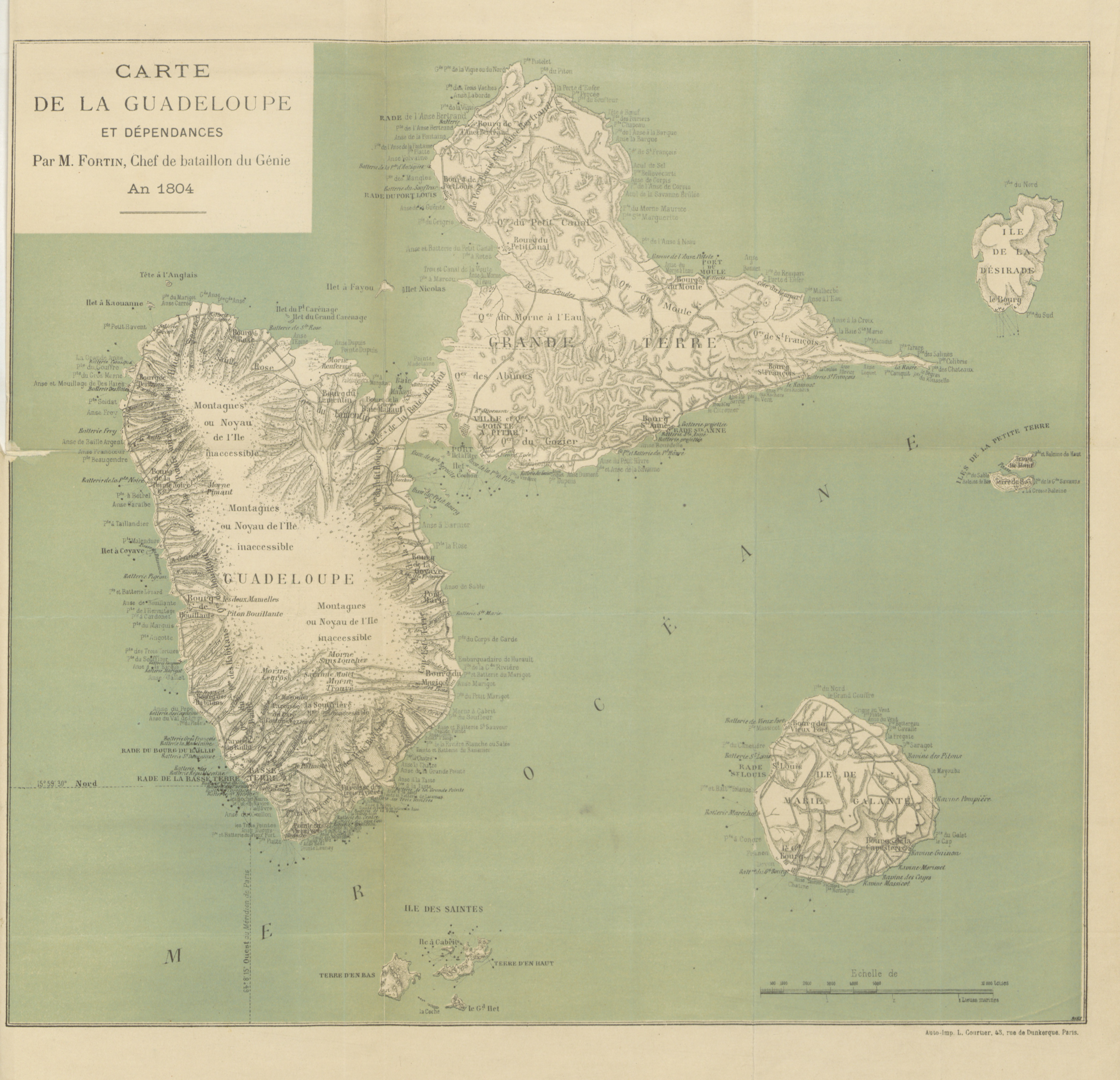
1804 map of Guadeloupe, illustrating the locations of the island's principal settlements. The action on 18 December 1809 took place in Anse à la Barque, a small bay to the east of Sainte-Anne.

Roquebert's expedition to the Caribbean was an unsuccessful operation by a French naval squadron to transport supplies to Guadeloupe in December 1809 at the height of the Napoleonic Wars. Over the previous year, British Royal Navy squadrons had isolated and defeated the French Caribbean colonies one by one, until by the autumn Guadeloupe was the only colony remaining in French hands. Cut off from the rest of the world by British blockade squadrons that intercepted all ships coming to or from the island, Guadeloupe was in a desperate situation, facing economic collapse, food shortages and social upheaval, as well as the impending threat of British invasion. In an effort to reinforce and resupply the colony, the French government sent four vessels to the West Indies in November 1809 under Commodore Dominique Roquebert. Two of the ships were 20-gun flûtes carrying supplies and troops. The two others were 40-gun frigates, ordered to protect the storeships on their journey from the British forces operating off both the French and Guadeloupe coasts.

The squadron almost reached the Caribbean without encountering any of patrolling British warships sent to watch for French reinforcements, but was spotted and intercepted by the frigate HMS Junon on 13 December. Junon's captain did not realise the size of the French squadron until it was too late and, despite fierce resistance, his ship was captured and he was mortally wounded. Destroying the badly damaged Junon and continuing with the mission, Roquebert successfully delivered the flûtes Loire and Seine to within sight of Guadeloupe and then left them, his frigates making their way back to France without ensuring the safe arrival of their convoy. On 15 December, the small British brig HMS Observateur, which had witnessed the defeat of Junon, brought news of the French arrival to the blockade squadron anchored off Basse-Terre. Summoning ships from the surrounding region, the British commander, Captain Volant Vashon Ballard amassed a significant squadron and forced the French flûtes to anchor in a protected bay at Anse à la Barque, on the southeastern coast of Guadeloupe.

Ineffectual efforts were made to capture the flûtes, but it was not until the arrival of the 74-gun HMS Sceptre under Captain Samuel James Ballard that an attack was made in earnest. As small ships engaged the batteries on shore, two frigates entered the bay and attacked the flûtes, causing both to surrender in an hour-long engagement. Both French ships were badly damaged and a fire started during the engagement was able to rapidly spread through them, destroying both ships in succession. Many of the French crew escaped ashore from the wrecks, while others were picked up by British ships. The blockade of Guadeloupe was successfully maintained, and the island was captured in a coordinated invasion a month later. Roquebert's remaining ships were intercepted on 16 January by a patrolling British frigate, but successfully escaped pursuit and eventually returned undamaged to France.

== Background ==
During the Napoleonic Wars, the Royal Navy rapidly and decisively seized control of the war at sea, driving French ships into protected harbours and laying heavy blockades on ports held by the French Empire and her allies to strangle communications and overseas trade. This had a devastating effect on the French West Indian colonies, particularly the islands of Martinique and Guadeloupe. With trade impossible, their economies stagnated while social upheaval and limited food supplies reduced their ability to resist invasion by the large British forces maintained in the region. In the summer of 1808, desperate messages were sent to France from the islands, prompting a succession of French efforts to supply food, reinforcements and trading opportunities during the latter part of 1808 and the first months of 1809. These efforts were entirely unsuccessful: the few ships that did safely reach the Caribbean Sea and successfully landed supplies were all intercepted and captured on the return journey, costing the French four frigates and numerous smaller ships by the end of February 1809.

The British blockade squadrons had intercepted a number of the messages sent from the islands during 1808, and a large expeditionary force was built up on Barbados with orders to invade and capture the French colonies as swiftly as possible. Their first target was Martinique, which was invaded and captured during February 1809. Outlying islands were captured over the next few months and a major French reinforcement squadron was trapped and then defeated near the Îles des Saintes in April: the French lost a ship of the line, and two more frigates were captured in June and July as they tried to return to France. With such heavy losses, the French took time preparing their next effort while the British were distracted by the Reconquista in Santo Domingo, a Spanish campaign to drive the French out of the island of Hispaniola that was eventually concluded in July 1809 with British naval assistance. By the autumn of 1809, the British commander, Vice-Admiral Sir Alexander Cochrane, was again developing an expeditionary force, this time aimed at Guadeloupe. He had strengthened the blockade squadron off the island's principal port Basse-Terre, and placed heavier forces at Martinique in case they were required. Individual ships were dispersed in the approaches to the French island, ready to intercept any approaching reinforcement. Other ships operated against ships already anchored off Guadeloupe: one squadron seized the corvette Nisus from Deshaies on 12 December.

In the months since Troude's failure, the French had only sent small supply ships to Guadeloupe, while carefully preparing a major expedition at Nantes. Two French flûtes, Loire, under the command of lieutenant de vaisseau Joseph Normand-Kergré, and Seine, under the command of lieutenant de vaisseau Bernard Vincent, took on board large quantities of food supplies and over 200 military reinforcements each. To protect these ships two frigates were detailed to escort the convoy to Guadeloupe: Renommée, under Commodore Dominique Roquebert, and Clorinde, under Captain Jacques Saint-Cricq. The force departed on 15 November 1809 and made rapid progress across the Atlantic, avoiding all contact with British warships. Of the small ships despatched around the same time, none reached Guadeloupe; all were captured in the Western Atlantic or Caribbean by warships sent by Cochrane to patrol for approaching French reinforcements.

== Destruction of HMS Junon ==
Roquebert's expedition to the Caribbean: Action of 13 December 1809
- Part of the Napoleonic Wars
Date	13 December 1809
Location	East of Antigua, 17°18′N 57°00′W
Result	French victory

Belligerents
(France) French Empire	United Kingdom

Commanders and leaders
Commodore Dominique Roquebert	Captain John Shortland †

Strength
frigates Renommée and Clorinde, flûtes Loire and Seine.	frigate HMS Junon and brig HMS Observateur

Casualties and losses
21 killed, 18 wounded	20 killed, 40 wounded, Junon destroyed.

Among the ships despatched by Cochrane was the 40-gun frigate HMS Junon under Captain John Shortland. Junon had been captured from the French less than a year earlier at the action of 10 February 1809, following an unsuccessful attempt to return to France from Guadeloupe. Hastily repaired, she had been commissioned into the Royal Navy and added to Cochrane's fleet, from where Cochrane had ordered her to patrol to the east of Antigua for ships attempting to evade the British blockade. On 13 December, Shortland, in company with the 16-gun brig HMS Observateur under Captain Frederick Wetherall, stopped an American merchant ship and boarded her in search of contraband. As he was engaged in the search, four sails appeared to the north. Shortland immediately gave chase, and by 16:00 realised his quarry was a squadron of four frigates. Firing warning shots in an effort to force the frigates to identify themselves, the strange ships raised Spanish colours. Initially unconvinced, Shortland raised the recognition signal for Spanish vessels and received the correct reply from the lead frigate. Closing with the ships during the afternoon, Junon was only a short distance from the lead ship at 17:30 when French colours replaced the Spanish and Roquebert ordered his ships to open fire.

Roquebert had learned the correct signals for Spanish shipping from captured Spanish merchant ships and, having lured Junon within range, opened a destructive fire from Renommée that caused severe damage to Junon's rigging. Unable to manoeuvre away from the French due to the damage suffered in the opening broadside, Shortland returned fire as best he could while closing with Renommée to inflict maximum damage. As Junon closed with the flagship, Clorinde attacked her from the other side and the flûtes took up stations fore and aft, repeatedly raking the British ship. (Note: James, in his report on the engagement with Junon, reports that Loire and Seine both fired their guns at Junon, one from in front and one from behind the British frigate, and that the French soldiers discharged their small arms, almost sweeping Junon's deck. Troude does not mention small arms, but insists that the two flûtes neither fired their guns nor received any cannon fire. James also gives the two flûtes heavier guns than do French records.) Observateur had been some distance behind Junon when the action began, and was thus not directly engaged by any of the French ships. Wetherall initially fired at Clorinde from extreme range, but soon recognised that he could do nothing to aid Junon in the face of overwhelming French numbers and so sailed westward to find and warn other British ships of the approaching French squadron. As Observateur escaped, Junon was pounded from all sides, Roquebert's ship coming so close to the British frigate that their rigging tangled and they collided, inflicting further damage. The French squadron was so close to Junon that the soldiers carried aboard for the garrison on Guadeloupe were able to fire their muskets at the British top deck, killing many of the sailors manning the guns.

Within ten minutes of the first shot, Junon's top deck was almost completely cleared and Shortland had been taken below, his leg broken by grapeshot and his body pierced by several large wooden splinters. Lieutenant Samuel Bartlett Deecker assumed command, and successfully beat off a boarding attack from Clorinde. Pulling Junon clear off the two full-strength French frigates, Deecker tried to escape but found his ship unresponsive. Within minutes, Roquebert and Saint-Cricq had regained their positions on either side of the British frigate and boarded simultaneously, forcing Deecker to surrender at 18:15. The British had suffered heavy losses, with 20 killed and 40 wounded, including Shortland. The prisoners were dispersed among the French squadron and rather than spare the men required to repair and crew the battered Junon, Roquebert had the frigate set on fire and abandoned. French losses were also severe, Renommée losing 15 killed and three wounded and Clorinde six killed and 15 wounded. Loire, Seine, and HMS Observateur suffered no losses at all.

== Operations off Guadeloupe ==
Although Junon had been destroyed, Observateur had escaped from the French squadron and immediately sought out the blockade force off Guadeloupe, the only place that the French squadron could be destined for. Arriving at Basse-Terre at 13:00 on 15 December, Captain Wetherall telegraphed the senior officer on the station, Captain Volant Vashon Ballard in the frigate HMS Blonde, of the impending arrival of Roquebert's squadron. Ballard swiftly gathered his squadron, the frigate HMS Thetis under Captain George Miller and the sloops HMS Hazard and HMS Cygnet, and positioned them in the channel between Guadeloupe and the Îles des Saintes, through which Roquebert's ships would have to pass. Urgent messages were sent to all nearby ships and bases, and the following day the sloops HMS Ringdove and HMS Scorpion joined the squadron. Ballard placed Hazard and Ringdove to watch Basse-Terre while the rest of squadron patrolled to the south of the island.

On the same day that Observateur arrived off Basse-Terre, the frigate HMS Castor under Captain William Roberts had recaptured the merchant brig Ariel near La Désirade, taken by Roquebert's squadron two weeks earlier. Roberts also discovered two other ships in the distance to the north and had closed to investigate, discovering the French convoy. Darkness fell soon afterwards and Castor separated from the French ships, as Roberts sailed westwards as fast as possible to notify Ballard of his sighting, arriving at 04:00 on 17 December. In the aftermath of the destruction of Junon and the encounter with Castor, Roquebert decided to separate from the convoy and return to France, turning north with Clorinde and leaving the supply ships to make the journey to Guadeloupe independently. As a result, Loire and Seine were sailing unprotected straight towards Ballard's squadron.

At daylight on 17 December, Blonde sighted the French flûtes approaching Basse-Terre from the northwest and Ballard advanced on them, blocking them from reaching Basse-Terre. Retreating northwest along the southern coastline of Guadeloupe, the flûtes entered a sheltered cove named Anse la Barque at 10:00, sheltering under two batteries on either side of the bay. Lieutenants Normand-Kergré and Vincent then anchored their ships parallel with the shore, so that they had the maximum number of cannon aimed at the entrance to the cove. As Ballard's ships cruised along the coast in light winds, seeking a way into the well-protected anchorage, other batteries opened fire, one striking Ringdove off Pointe Lizard. Captain William Dowers of Ringdove then landed a shore party from his ship and stormed the battery, capturing it in 15 minutes. He demolished the position and withdrew to his ship, rejoining Ballard off Anse la Barque. Ballard then tested the feasibility of an attack on the French ships, ordering the 12-gun schooner HMS Elizabeth to assess the depth of the entrance to the bay while he in Blonde attacked the batteries directly at 16:00. Discovering that the entrance was navigable. Blonde and Elizabeth withdrew out of range. Operations were then suspended for the evening to allow additional reinforcements to come up. During the night the frigate HMS Freya (or Freija) under Captain John Hayes joined Ballard's squadron.

== Destruction of Loire and Seine ==
Roquebert's expedition to the Caribbean: Action of 18 December 1809
- Part of the Napoleonic Wars
Date	18 December 1809
Location	Anse la Barque, Guadeloupe; 16°14′25″N 61°19′25″W
Result	British victory

Belligerents
(France) French Empire	United Kingdom

Commanders and leaders
Lieutenant Joseph-Normand Kergré and Lieutenant Bernard Vincent	Captain Samuel James Ballard

Strength
Flûtes Loire and Seine with support from batteries on shore	frigates HMS Thetis and HMS Blonde with support from HMS Sceptre, HMS Freija, HMS Ringdove, HMS Hazard, HMS Cygnet and HMS Elizabeth

Casualties and losses
Unknown, Loire and Seine destroyed	At least 9 killed, 22 wounded

At 08:30 on the morning of 18 December, a small boat sailed from Anse la Barque with a message offering the British a temporary truce. Simultaneously the British ship of the line HMS Sceptre arrived from Fort Royal on Martinique under the command of Captain Samuel James Ballard, who immediately assumed command of the diverse squadron assembled at the entrance to the bay. Ballard dismissed the French negotiators and ordered an immediate attack on the anchored frigates. His plan was simple: Blonde and Thetis would enter the harbour and engage the flûtes directly, while Sceptre and Freija would engage the gun batteries to prevent them targeting the small brigs bringing up the rear. The brigs would be towing boats full of sailors and Royal Marines, who would storm the French ships and gun positions as they were engaged with the larger warships.

The plan was initially frustrated by light winds, but by 14:25 Blonde and Thetis were within range of the gun batteries and fifteen minutes later they were able to open fire on the flûtes, although still at quite a distance. Becalmed in the bay, Blonde was forced to engage one of the forts instead, fire from the shore causing some damage but not enough to endanger the ship. Thetis was luckier, and Captain Miller was able to close with one of the French ships, although their identities during the engagement are uncertain in historical accounts and it is not clear which one was first into the action. By 15:35, Thetis had dismasted her opponent, which surrendered. Moving against the second ship, Thetis was then also becalmed and was forced to engage the forts instead. As Sceptre led the remainder of the squadron into the bay, fire was seen spreading through the surrendered ship and, in the face of overwhelming opposition, the second flûte also surrendered at 16:20.

By 17:10, Thetis and Blonde began to withdraw from the bay as the fire took hold of the first frigate. The rest of the British squadron, despite heavy cannon fire from a fort on shore, successfully landed their troops and stormed and captured the defences. There were heavy casualties in the storming parties, including Hugh Cameron, captain of Hazard, who was killed by grapeshot. At 17:20, the fire reached the magazines of the burning flûte, and the ensuing explosion hurled burning wreckage across the bay. The British ships were largely untouched, but the second French flûte was struck by a large piece of flaming timber, which ignited her mainmast and destroyed her as well. The operations successfully completed, the British ships embarked their landing parties, who had demolished the fortifications around the bay, and returned to open water. (Note: With respect to the engagement at Anse à la Barque, Troude reports that the French vessels started to unload their cargo. When the British attacked, Vincent, on Seine, cut her masts and opened her scuttles to flood her. The water did not enter fast enough, so he fired her guns into the hold. This had the effect of starting a fire that led to the explosion that destroyed her, and set fire to Loire, destroying her also. Troude also reports that the British landing party attacked Battery Choppard, of four guns, which repelled them.)

In total the British had lost eight killed and 16 wounded on Blonde, six wounded on Thetis, and an uncertain number lost in the amphibious operation, although casualty figures are not known. French losses in the engagement are also uncertain, although most of the crews of Loire and Seine were able to quite easily reach the shore. Among those that did make land were a section of prisoners from Junon, including the grievously wounded Captain Shortland. Transported across the island on a wagon in the full glare of the sun, Shortland's condition rapidly worsened and he died on 21 January 1810 without regaining consciousness. He was buried at Basse-Terre with full military honours. Four decades later the battle was among the actions recognised by the clasp "ANSE LA BARQUE 18 DECR. 1809" attached to the Naval General Service Medal, awarded upon application to all British participants still living in 1847.

== Aftermath ==
Roquebert's remaining frigates turned north after parting from the storeships, sighting the British squadron in the distance and grounding on a sandbar off Antigua in their haste to escape. Throwing overboard their guns and stores, the ships were lightened enough to regain open water. They then returned to European waters, avoiding all contact with British shipping until 16 January 1810 at position 40°50′N 12°09′W, approximately 200 nautical miles (370 km) west of the Portuguese coast, when they encountered the frigate HMS Virginie under Captain Edward Brace. Brace shadowed the French frigates for two days, but was unable to close with them and Roquebert made no attempt to use his superior strength against the British frigate. Eventually, Roquebert outran Virginie and on 23 January reached Brest safely. Within a year, Roquebert and Saint-Cricq would be despatched on another mission to resupply a French colony, sailing with the frigate Néréide to Île de France in December 1810. Unknown to the French authorities, a British expeditionary force had already captured the island, and Roquebert's squadron was ambushed in May 1811 and brought to battle off Tamatave in Madagascar. Néréide and Renomée were both captured and Roquebert killed in action. Clorinde only escaped by deserting the other ships in the middle of the engagement, fleeing north and eventually reaching France.

In the West Indies, the failure of the main resupply effort resulted in a further drop in morale among the defenders of Guadeloupe. Other smaller ships sent with supplies were captured during the operations against Roquebert's squadron, including the brig Béarnais captured on 14 December and Papillion on 19 December. In January 1810, the blockade tightened: Scorpion captured the brig Oreste from inside the harbour at Basse-Terre and Freija seized several coastal vessels in Baie-Mahault. By 27 January, Cochrane's preparations for the invasion of Guadeloupe were complete and 7,000 men were landed under Lieutenant-General George Beckwith. The French garrison largely deserted, and by 6 February all resistance was defeated and the governor, General Jean Augustin Ernouf, surrendered. Over the rest of the month, the few remaining colonies belonging to France and the Netherlands were seized without opposition and the entire Caribbean was either under British or Spanish control, with the exception of the independent state of Haiti.
