= HMS Elizabeth (1805) =

Brig of the Royal Navy

History

France
- Name: Elizabeth
- Captured: 1805

United Kingdom
- Name: HMS Elizabeth
- Acquired: 1805 (by capture)
- Honours and awards: Naval General Service Medal (NGSM) with clasps: "Anse la Barque 18 Decr. 1809"; "Guadaloupe"
- Fate: Foundered 1814

General characteristics
- Type: Schooner, later brig
- Tons burthen: Schooner: 121 (bm); Brig: 14051/94 (bm)
- Length: Schooner: 68 ft 8 in (20.9 m) (overall); 53 ft 3 in (16.2 m) (keel); Brig: 72 ft 8 in (22.1 m) (overall); 57 ft 2 in (17.4 m) (keel)
- Beam: Schooner:20 ft 8 in (6.3 m); Brig:21 ft 6 in (6.6 m)
- Depth of hold: Schooner:8 ft 4 in (2.5 m); Brig:9 ft 0 in (2.7 m)
- Sail plan: Schooner, later Brig
- Complement: At capture:102; HM schooner:35; HM brig:55
- Armament: At capture: 10 × 6-pounder guns + 4 × 9-pounder carronades; HMS:10 × 12-pounder carronades + 2 × 6-pounder chase guns

HMS Elizabeth was a French privateer schooner that the Royal Navy captured in 1805 and took into service under her existing name. She participated in an engagement and a campaign that earned her crews clasps to the Naval General Service Medal. She was lost with all hands in 1814 when she capsized in the West Indies.

== Capture ==
On 16 December 1805 Kingfisher captured the French privateer schooner Elisabeth after a 12-hour chase. Elizabeth, which was out of Guadaloupe, was armed with ten 6-pounder guns and four 9-pounder carronades. She had a crew of 102, but 11 men were away in the Cambrian, which Elizabeth had captured after Cambrian had left a convoy on 28 October. Cambrian had been carrying a cargo of coal from Cork to Jamaica; HMS Melville recaptured Cambrian. Cochrane noted that Elizabeth was a fine vessel, well worth taking into the Royal Navy, which advice the Navy took.

== Service ==
Lieutenant Charles Finch commissioned HMS Elizabeth in Antigua in 1808.

Elizabeth sailed on 15 December 1809 from Basse-terre, Guadeloupe, with a small squadron in search of a French squadron reported to be in the area. Over the next two days two frigates and two sloops joined them.

The squadron sighted two French ships on 17 December and gave chase. These were the flûtes Loire and Seine. The two flûtes evaded the pursuing British and anchored under a shore battery in a cove at Anse à la Barque, Guadeloupe.

On 17 December 1809 Elizabeth joined the squadron at Anse la Barque. Captain Volant Vashon Ballard of Blonde sent Elizabeth to try for an anchorage. Blonde then followed to provide support. Once they had determined that British frigates could anchor, they withdrew. Late that afternoon Blonde and Thetis came in, anchored, and engaged the two French ships. The 74-gun Sceptre and the frigate Freya (also Freija) cannonaded the batteries. Cygnet, Hazard, Ringdove, and Elizabeth, in the meantime, towed in the boats of the squadron to land seamen and marines to storm the batteries. Loire and Seine struck, but Seine caught fire when her crew fired their guns into her hold to scuttle her, and exploded. This set fire to Loire. The result was that both were destroyed. British accounts state that the landing party succeeded in capturing a battery; French accounts state that Battery Coupard, of four guns, repelled them. In all, the British lost nine men killed, and 22 wounded, but Elizabeth herself apparently sustained no casualties. In 1847 the Admiralty awarded the NGSM with clasp "Anse la Barque 18 Decr. 1809" to all surviving claimants from the action.

Still under Finch's command, Elizabeth participated in the capture of Guadeloupe in January and February 1810. (Note: A first-class share of the prize money for Guadeloupe was worth £113 3s 1 1/4d; a sixth-class share, that of an ordinary seaman, was worth £1 9s 1 1/4d.) In 1847 the Admiralty awarded the NGSM with clasp "Guadaloupe" to all surviving claimants from the action.

On 24 March 1810, the inhabitants of St Thomas presented Lieutenant Edward F. Dwyer with a gift of 140 guineas to purchase a sword or such other object of his choosing as a token of their appreciation for his service as commander of Elizabeth while she served as a guardship there.

At some point the Navy converted Elizabeth from a schooner to a brig. The letter from the inhabitants of St Thomas refers to Elizabeth as a schooner. However, a listing of vessels on the Leeward Islands station as of 1 July 1812, shows the gun-brig Elizabeth, of 10 guns and 55 men, under the command of Lieutenant E.F. Dwyer.

On 24 November 1812 Elizabeth captured the schooner Laura.

Elizabeth, Surprise, Opossum, and Spider were in company on 13 March 1813 when they captured Lark. (Note: A first-class share was worth £71 14s 5 1/2d; a sixth-class share was worth £1 1s 9 3/4d.)

== Loss ==
By 1814 Elizabeth was under the command of Lieutenant Jonathan Widdicombe Dyer. She capsized in the West Indies on 31 October 1814 while pursuing an American privateer.
