= French brig Observateur =

Observateur
History

France
- Name: Observateur
- Ordered: October 1799 as "No.4"
- Builder: Jean Fouache and Entreprise Thibaudier, Le Havre
- Laid down: 7 July 1799
- Launched: 20 July 1800
- Captured: 6 June 1806

United Kingdom
- Name: HMS Observateur
- Acquired: by capture
- Honours and awards: Naval General Service Medal with clasp "Guadaloupe"

General characteristics
- Class & type: Vigilant-class brig
- Displacement: 343–379 tons (French)
- Tons burthen: 303 (bm)
- Length: 90 ft 6 in (27.6 m) (overall); 72 ft 8 in (22.1 m) (keel)
- Beam: 28 ft 0 in (8.5 m)
- Depth of hold: 7 ft 6 in (2.3 m)
- Sail plan: Brig
- Complement: French service:105; British service:95
- Armament: French service: Originally: 16 × 4-pounder guns; 1803: 16 × 6-pounder guns; 1805: 14 × 4-pounder guns, 4 × 12-pounder British carronades; British service: 14 × 24-pounder carronades + 2 × 6-pounder chase guns

The French brig Observateur, which was launched in 1800 for the French Navy, was a Vigilant-class 16-gun brig, one of six built to a design by Pierre-Alexandre-Laurent Forfait. The Royal Navy captured her in 1806 and took her into service as HMS Observateur. She participated in two actions, one for the French Navy and one for the Royal Navy, and one campaign before she was laid up in 1810. The Navy did not succeed in selling her until 1814.

== French service ==
The French Navy commissioned Observateur in 1802 and by 4 October 1802 she was under the command of lieutenant de vaisseau Bonamy, having sailed from Havre to Newfoundland protecting French fisherman, and then returning to Brest. Then between 8 April 1803 and 13 September, still under the command of Bonamy, by now a capitaine de frégate, Observateur returned from Saint-Domingue to Brest, cruised to the region around Santa Maria Island, and then returned to Corogne, finishing at Ferrol.

On 28 January 1806 Observateur was under the command of Lieutenant de vaisseau Jean Croizė and part of the Ferrol squadron. She sailed with the combined fleet from Ferrol to Cadiz. Then between 1 March and 4 April, Observateur sailed from Cadiz to Cayenne. She was in company with her sister-ship Argus, under the command of Lieutenant de vaisseau Yves-François Taillard, the senior commander. On 3 March they encountered a British corvette in the Atlantic. Argus was eager to escape and abandoned Observateur.

Observateur sailed less well and a single-ship action ensued, during which she suffered several casualties, both dead and wounded. Neither side was able to prevail, and though Observateur lost her bowsprit while attempting to board the British vessel, the British vessel did not pursue her advantage that evening. Next morning combat resumed, but at a distance and the British vessel withdrew, freeing Observateur to make for Santa Cruz de Tenerife. Although Observateur was unable to determine the name of her adversary, despite retaining a British flag that had somehow fallen aboard during the boarding attempt, Croizé was able to determine that she was a three-master armed with 26 guns. On 6 March, as Observateur approached the port a British lugger approached and a new engagement ensued. Fortunately, the governor of Teneriffe sent out another brig and two schooners to chase the lugger off and escort Observateur to safety. Observateur spent 40 days there refitting before she sailed again for Cayenne where she met up again with Argus.

== Capture ==
On 9 June 1806 the frigate Tartar, in company with Bacchus, captured Observateur after a chase and a slight exchange of gunfire. Observateur, of 16 guns, though pierced for 20, had a crew of 104. She had left Cayenne on 15 March provisioned for a cruise of four months and in company with the French brig Argus, but had not taken anything. Several days prior to the engagement Croizé had taken ill; he had, therefore, relinquished command to his second-in-command, enseigne de vaisseau Robert-Henri Debernes. One problem confronting Observateur was that although she carried four British 12-pounder carronades in addition to her twelve 4-pounder guns, the only shot she had for the 12-pounders were actually for 8-pounders.

== British service ==
The Royal Navy immediately took her into service as HMS Observateur. Admiral John Poer Beresford, chief of the Halifax station, wrote that the officers of the yard there spoke so highly of Observateur that he commissioned her there under Lieutenant the Honourable George Alfred Crofton (acting). (Note: Crofton's appointment was dated 24 June 1806.) Beresford gave Crofton a complete crew of officers and men and instructed him to sail to Bermuda to search for Argus.

Venelia, Eldridge, master, arrived at Bermuda on 19 July 1806. She had been sailing from New York to Martinique when Observateur detained her. A week later the American vessel Huntress, Dodge, master, arrived at Bermuda also. She had been sailing from New York to New Orleans when Observateur detained her. Lastly, in December, Observateur detained and sent into Bermuda Eliza, Gardner, master, which had been sailing from Cap Francois to Saint Bartholomew.

In February 1807 Commander William Love replaced Crofton. However, on 17 December Observateur was under the command of Commander Charles Claridge when she captured Mars.

In January 1808 Lieutenant John Lawrence took command; he received his promotion to commander in March. Later that year Commander Richard Smith replaced Lawrence.

Lieutenant Frederick Wetherall (or Weatherall) took temporary command in December 1809. On 13 December Observateur was off Antigua and in company with Junon when they sighted four unknown ships heading west towards Guadeloupe. Both British vessels turned to intercept, with Observateur in the lead. Wetherall identified the four as frigates rather than merchantmen and signaled this information to Junon, Observateur then cleared for action. When the two British ships were within long range, Observateur fired a warning shot and both she and Junon moved to close with the lead frigate preparatory to engaging them. However as the British ships approached, the lead frigate ran up a Spanish flag, shortly followed by the British Red Ensign. Believing the unknown ships to be Spanish allies, Wetherall and Shortland reduced sail and Junon moved to come alongside the lead frigate to permit Captain Shortland to exchange greetings with her captain.

When Junon was close, the lead frigate suddenly hauled down her Spanish and British flags and raised the French ensign. The following three frigates followed suit, and all four opened fire on Junon at short range. Junon's crew were taken by surprise; a ragged retaliatory broadside struck two of the French ships but caused little damage. Junon herself received broadsides to her port, starboard and stern and quickly became indefensible; her crew surrendered after French soldiers boarded her. A total of 15 British sailors were killed and 44 wounded, including Shortland.

Observateur fired upon the French when the engagement began but Junon's capture was too swift for her to directly assist Junon. Instead, Wetherall made sail and escaped to the west.

The French frigates were Clorinde, Renommée, Loire and Seine, en route to Guadeloupe with supplies and reinforcements for the colony. Overall command rested with Captain Dominque Roquebert aboard Clorinde. Roquebert's logs indicate he had not initially intended to engage the British, and had raised the Spanish flag in the hope that they would leave his ships alone. However, when Junon and Observateur drew near, Roquebert decide to continue with the ruse of the false flag to lure the British into range of all four French vessels at the same time. The French suffered 80 casualties, including 34 killed. All casualties were from among the crews of Clorinde and Renommée which had come alongside Junon during the battle. Seine and Loire had engaged the British ship from the rear and had not come under fire from either Junon or Observateur.

Wetherall sailed to Marie Galante where he advised Admiral Alexander Cochrane that the French had captured and burnt Junon. On 18 December Pultusk arrived and informed Cochrane that two of the frigates he was seeking were anchored some three leagues NW of Basse-Terre. Cochrane immediately set out in Pompee, together with a number of other vessels. There Cochrane found that Captain Samuel James Ballard in Sceptre had a squadron in place and was preparing to attack Seine and Loire, anchored in Anse à la Barque ("Barque Cove"). The British attack was successful in that the French abandoned Seine and Loire and set fire to them.

Observateur participated in the capture of Guadeloupe in January and February 1810. (Note: A first-class share of the prize money for Guadaloupe was worth £113 3s 1¼d; a sixth-class share, that of an ordinary seaman, was worth £1 9s 1¼d.) In 1847 the Admiralty awarded the Naval General Service Medal with clasp "Guadaloupe" to all surviving participants of the campaign.

George, Lovell, master, was sailing from Boston to Havana when Observateur detained her. George arrived in Bermuda on 26 March 1810.

Observateur was temporarily under the command of Commander Henry Jane (acting). Jane was appointed to the sloop Indian on the Halifax station on 10 May 1810, and Wetheral remained in command until November. By end-October Observateur was at Sheerness.

== Fate ==
Observateur arrived at Deptford on 4 November 1810, where she was laid up. The Principal Officers and Commissioners of His Majesty's Navy offered the "Observateur Brig, 310 Tons" for sale on 27 November 1811. She did not sell on that date, nor on several later occasions in 1814. The Navy finally sold her for £640 on 1 September 1814.
