= Action of 22 January 1809 =

1809 battle of the Caribbean campaign of 1803–1810

- Part of the Caribbean campaign of 1803–1810
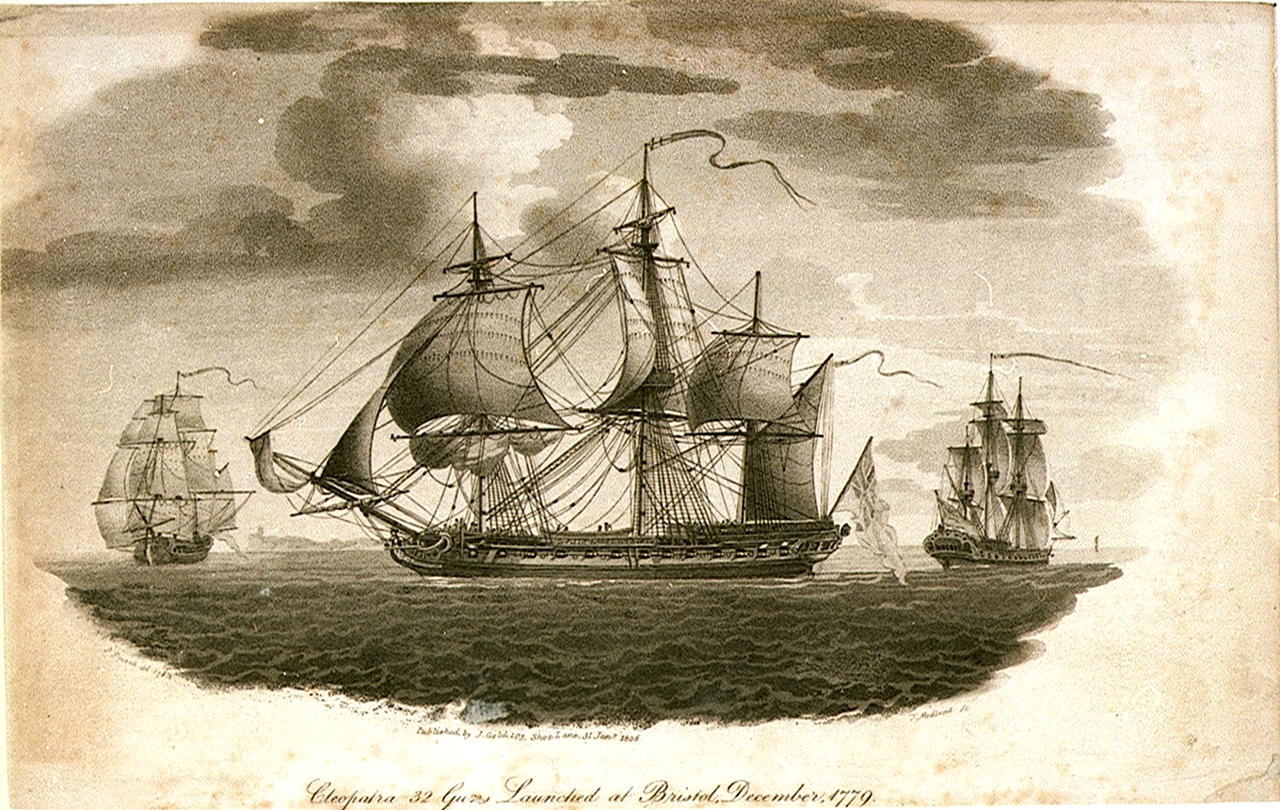
- 1805 engraving of HMS Cleopatra
Date	22 January 1809
Location	Off Pointe-Noire, Caribbean Sea 16°12′50″N 61°48′00″W
Result	British victory

Belligerents
United Kingdom	France

Commanders and leaders
Samuel Pechell	Pierre-Nicolas Lahalle

Strength
2 frigates 1 sloop	1 frigate

Casualties and losses
2 killed 1 wounded	12 killed 14 wounded 1 frigate captured

The action of 22 January 1809 was a minor naval engagement fought off the Caribbean island of Guadeloupe during the Napoleonic Wars. The action was fought as part of the blockade of Guadeloupe and neighbouring Martinique by a large British Royal Navy squadron, which was seeking to cut the islands off from contact and supplies from France by preventing the passage of shipping from Europe to the islands. The British blockade was part of their preparation for planned invasions during the next year.

The French made numerous efforts to supply their colonies during this period, attempting to use fast frigates to bring food and military stores to the Caribbean past the British blockades, themselves a response to Napoleon's Continental System, but often losing the vessels in the process. One such attempt was made by the French frigate Topaze, despatched from Brest to the colony of Cayenne with a large cargo of flour. Driven away from Cayenne by HMS Confiance, Topaze took refuge under the gun batteries of Guadeloupe.

Discovered at anchor off Pointe-Noire on 22 January by the British brig HMS Hazard, Topaze was isolated and attacked by two British frigates, led by Captain Samuel Pechell in HMS Cleopatra. In the ensuing engagement, the British ships outnumbered and overwhelmed their opponent, capturing the ship and her cargo, despite heavy fire from a French gun battery that overlooked the anchorage. The British ships were drawn from a force gathered for the impending invasion of Martinique, which was launched six days after Topaze had been captured and successfully completed in a campaign lasting just over three weeks.

== Background ==
By the summer of 1808, the Napoleonic Wars were five years old and the British Royal Navy—whose success during the 1793–1801 French Revolutionary Wars had continued into the new conflict—was dominant at sea. In an effort to restrict French movement and trade, the British fleet actively blockaded French ports, maintaining squadrons of fast frigates and large ships of the line off every important French harbour and smaller warships off less significant anchorages to intercept any vessel that attempted to enter or leave. This strategy was practised across the French Empire, particularly in the West Indies, where lucrative British trade routes were at constant risk from raiding French warships and privateers. As a result, the economies of the French colonies, especially the islands of Martinique and Guadeloupe, collapsed and their food stocks, military supplies and morale all began to run low. Messages requesting assistance from France were despatched but many were intercepted by British ships, convincing the Admiralty to order invasions of the French colonies. During late 1808 and early 1809 therefore, expeditionary forces were sent to occupy the smaller colonies while a major army and naval fleet were assembled on Barbados under Sir Alexander Cochrane in readiness for an attack on Martinique.

In France, news of the situation in the West Indies forced the authorities to take action. During the autumn of 1808, a number of ships were despatched carrying much needed food and military supplies, but several were intercepted, including the frigate Thétis, captured during the action of 10 November 1808 in the Bay of Biscay. Despite the losses, some ships did reach their destination intact and further supply ships were prepared, including the frigate Topaze, ordered to transport 1,100 barrels of flour to the colony of Cayenne. The cargo was loaded during late November and early December, the frigate also carrying military supplies and 100 soldiers to augment the Cayenne garrison. The ship, under the command of Captain Pierre-Nicolas Lahalle, was only three years old and carried 40 heavy guns.

In early December 1808, Topaze departed Brest and travelled across the Atlantic, encountering the British frigate HMS Loire in the Bay of Biscay. Loire fired on Topaze, but was unable to catch her and, despite minor damage, the French ship was able to reach the Caribbean without further incident. Nearing Cayenne on 13 January 1809, Lahalle was surprised to see the British sloop-of-war HMS Confiance emerge from the harbour and manoeuvre threateningly towards his ship. Fearing that there were other British warships nearby, he turned and sailed northwards; in fact, Confiance was the only British ship in the vicinity and she was severely underarmed, with a crew of just 47 men, including 20 local civilians conscripted on the spot. Cayenne capitulated on the next day to an Anglo-Portuguese invasion force under Captain James Lucas Yeo.

== Battle ==
With Cayenne no longer under French control, Topaze made all speed for Guadeloupe, Lahalle intending to land his food supplies and reinforcements on French-held territory before attempting the return journey to Europe. For nine days Topaze crossed the Caribbean without encountering any British warships, but at 07:00 on 22 January she was spotted approaching Guadeloupe from the southwest by the brig HMS Hazard under Captain Hugh Cameron, which was part of a squadron detached from Cochrane's invasion fleet on Barbados to watch the French islands. Although his lookouts had also sighted a French schooner close inshore, Cameron gave orders for his brig to close with the much larger French frigate instead. Within two hours, Hazard was joined by the frigates HMS Cleopatra under Captain Samuel Pechell and HMS Jason under Captain William Maude. Although both ships were smaller than Topaze, together they held a considerable advantage over the overladen French ship.

With Hazard approaching from the northeast, Cleopatra from the southeast and Jason from the south, Lahalle had only one clear route available, eastwards directly towards Guadeloupe. By 11:00, Topaze was 200 yards (180 m) offshore, sheltering in the anchorage off Pointe-Noire, which was protected by a small gun battery manned by soldiers from the island's garrison. Over the next three and a half hours, the British ships steadily approached the bay, hampered by light winds. The breeze strengthened at 14:30 and by 16:30 Cleopatra was close enough for Topaze to open fire on her from 25 yards (23 m). Under fire, Pechell manoeuvered into an advantageous position off Topaze's bow and began to fire on his opponent, shooting away one of the French ship's anchors. This caused her to swing with her bow towards the shore and Cleopatra was able to repeatedly rake Lahalle's ship from close range.

Severely damaged, Topaze was unable to effectively respond, the only serious danger to the British ships coming from the battery onshore. By 17:10 Jason and Hazard had joined Cleopatra, the brig bombarding the battery while Jason opened fire on the other side of the French ship, causing further damage. Recognising that his situation was hopeless, Lahalle surrendered at 17:20. As the French colours fell, approximately a third of the 430 soldiers and sailors on board Topaze attempted to escape captivity by diving overboard and swimming for the shore. Many drowned, and more were killed when Jason opened fire on the swimmers, although exact losses in the water are unknown. The remainder of the survivors, including Lahalle, totalled almost 300 men and were all made prisoners of war. The badly damaged Topaze was towed out of the bay and taken to a British port for repairs.

== Aftermath ==
With the exception of the aforementioned Topaze, casualties were minimal: none were recorded on Jason and Hazard and none in the French battery on shore. Cleopatra, due to the poor position and accuracy of her opponent, lost only two men killed and one wounded, the most serious damage being to her masts and rigging, which were badly cut up. Losses among the French that didn't attempt to flee crew in the engagement were also relatively light, with 12 dead and 14 wounded, although a number of men were killed in their attempt to swim for shore after Topaze had surrendered. The French frigate was badly damaged, particularly in her hull, and required extensive repairs before she was fit for service in the Royal Navy, commissioned under the new name of HMS Alcmene.

On 28 January, Cochrane's fleet at Barbados, including Jason, Cleopatra and Hazard, sailed for Martinique, arriving two days later and conducting successful landings at three points on the island. Within a week, all of the French colony was in British hands except for Fort Desaix, which held out for a further three weeks before surrendering after a heavy bombardment. The following month, a major reinforcement fleet arrived from France but was unable to affect the situation on Martinique and anchored in Îles des Saintes, a small archipelago to the south of Guadeloupe. There they were blockaded and attacked by Cochrane's squadron and in the ensuing Action of 14–17 April 1809 were defeated, with the ship of the line D'Hautpoul captured and the remainder driven back to Europe. Two frigates reached Guadeloupe, but both were later captured. Subsequent attempts to resupply Guadeloupe, the only remaining French position in the West Indies, were made during 1809, and a squadron under Commodore Francois Roquebert managed to capture a British frigate at the action of 13 December 1809. However, this force was intercepted by a British blockade squadron near Guadeloupe at the action of 18 December 1809 and defeated, with two frigates destroyed and two others forced to return to Europe without reaching their destination. Guadeloupe was subsequently invaded in January 1810 and captured, ending direct French interest in the Americas during the Napoleonic Wars.
