= Admiral Ballard =

Admiral Ballard may refer to:

- George Alexander Ballard (1862–1948), British Royal Navy admiral
- Samuel James Ballard (1765–1829), British Royal Navy vice admiral
- Volant Vashon Ballard (1774–1832), British Royal Navy rear admiral
