= HMS Ringdove (1806) =

British brig-sloop (1806–1829)

- Ringdove

History

United Kingdom
- Name: HMS Ringdove
- Ordered: 27 January 1806
- Builder: Warren, Brightlingsea
- Laid down: April 1806
- Launched: 16 October 1806
- Honours and awards: Naval General Service Medal with clasps; "Martinique"; "Anse la Barque 18 Decr. 1809"; "Guadaloupe"
- Fate: Sold on 11 June 1829

General characteristics
- Class & type: Cruizer-class brig-sloop
- Tons burthen: 384 85/94 (bm)
- Length: 100 ft 1 1/2 in (30.5 m) (overall); 77 ft 3 1/2 in (23.6 m) (keel)
- Beam: 30 ft 6 in (9.3 m)
- Depth of hold: 12 ft 9 in (3.9 m)
- Propulsion: Sails
- Sail plan: Brig-sloop
- Complement: 121
- Armament: 16 × 32-pounder carronades; 2 × 6-pounder chase guns

HMS Ringdove (or Ring Dove) was a Royal Navy 18-gun Cruizer-class brig-sloop that Matthew Warren built at Brightlingsea and launched in 1806. She took some prizes and participated in three actions or campaigns that qualified her crew for clasps to the Naval General Service Medal. The Admiralty sold her in 1829 to Samuel Cunard, who would go on to found the Cunard Line.

== Napoleonic Wars ==
Ringdove was commissioned in 1806 under Commander George Andrews for the Baltic and the North Sea. (Note: In 1804 Andrews had commanded the armed defense ship Indefatigable)

On 7 January Ringdove was in the company of Ariadne when Ringdove captured the French letter of marque lugger Trente et Quarante. The lugger was three months old and 16 days out of Dunkirk without having taken any prizes. She was under the command of M. Fanqueux, carried 16 guns (6 and 9-pounders), of which 14 were mounted, and had a crew of 65.

Next day, two brigs, which turned out to be the Excise vessel Royal George and Sappho, were chasing a French lugger when Ariadne and Ringdove came on the scene. Royal George, J.T. Currie (or Curry), Commander, then captured the French lugger, which was the privateer Eglee (or Eglé), under the command of M. Olivier. She was armed with 16 guns, all 3 or 4-pounders, and had left Dunkirk on 31 December. She had made one capture, the brig Gabriel, of Yarmouth, which she had taken the night before and scuttled. Captain A. Farquhar of Ariadne saw Gabriel still floating and dispatched Ringdove to investigate. Andrews reported that the brig was sinking so fast that it was impossible to save her. However, Gabriel's Master and crew were aboard Eglé. Farquhar then sent Trente et Quarante and Eglé into Yarmouth.

Later in 1808 Ringdove came under the temporary command of Lieutenant George Peak and was deployed to the Shetland Islands. Within a few weeks, Peak had captured the Danish privateer Forden Shieold (or Torden Skiöld) off Bergen, Norway on 30 March. She was only four hours out of port. Initially Forden Shieold would not surrender but after a few shots from Ringdove had killed one man and wounded two others she struck. The bad weather prevented Peak from taking her crew of 62 men prisoners until the next day. The privateer was pierced for 14 guns, but only carried ten 6-pounder guns. She had already captured five prizes in voyages over the previous four months. Peak was commended for his capture and the crew received prize money for the hull, stores and head money at Leith the following October.

On 14 December 1808 Ringdove sailed for the Leeward Islands. She was at the invasion of Martinique in February 1809. In 1847 the Admiralty authorized the issuance to all remaining survivors of the campaign of the Naval General Service Medal with clasp "Martinique". At some point George Andrews returned to command.

In April 1809, a strong French squadron arrived at the Îles des Saintes, south of Guadeloupe. There they were blockaded until 14 April, when a British force under Major-General Frederick Maitland and Captain Philip Beaver in Acasta, invaded and captured the islands. Ringdove was among the naval vessels that shared in the proceeds of the capture of the islands. (Note: The prize agent for a number of the vessels involved, Henry Abbott, went bankrupt. In May 1835 there was a final payment of a dividend from his estate. A first-class share was worth 10s 2 3/4d; a sixth-class share, that of an ordinary seaman, was worth 1d. Seventh-class (landsmen) and eighth-class (boys) shares were fractions of a penny, too small to pay.)

Then in June 1809 command passed to Commander Humphrey Fleming Senhouse. He remained in command until December.

Command passed to Commander William Dowers. Ringdove took part in the Action of 17 December 1809 in which a British squadron, first under Captain Volant Vashon Ballard and then under Captain Samuel James Ballard, destroyed two to attack two French flûtes, Loire and Seine. During the operations, French batteries opened fire on the British force, one shot striking Ringdove, then off Pointe Lizard. Dowers landed a shore party that stormed the battery, capturing it in 15 minutes. He demolished the position and withdrew to his ship, rejoining Volant Ballard off Anse la Barque at Basse Terre Island. This actions led to the award in 1847 of the clasps "Anse La Barque 18 Decr. 1809" to all surviving claimants.

Subsequently, Ringdove was also at the Invasion of Guadeloupe, and the invasion of Sint Maarten and Sint Eustatius. (Note: A first-class share of the prize money for Guadaloupe was worth £113 3s 1 1/4d; a sixth-class share, that of an ordinary seaman, was worth £1 9s 1 1/4d.) This campaign led to the award in 1847 of the clasps "Anse La Barque 18 Decr. 1809" and "Guadaloupe" to the Naval General Service Medal. Ringdove remained in the Leeward Islands through 1812.

July 1812 proved a month of successful prize-taking for Ringdove. On 7 July she captured the brig Enterprise, of 193 tons (bm), from St. Ube's, bound to New York. The Enterprise was carrying a cargo of salt. The next day she captured the Russel, bound to Marblehead and laden with fish. On 9 July Ringdove captured the Hunter, which was sailing to Sable Island with a cargo of fish. Nine days later Ringdove captured the ship Magnet, of 172 tons (bm), from Belfast, bound to New York, with passengers, and a small quantity of linen. The Royal Navy took Magnet into service as a prison ship at Halifax, Nova Scotia. Ringdove was in company with the hired ketch Gleaner. (Note: In September 1815 there was a pay out of a grant for the capture. A first-class share was worth £346 15s 2 1/2d; a sixth-class share, that of an ordinary seaman, was worth £5 7s 7d.)

On 19 July Ringdove captured the schooner Rover, of 98 tons (bm), sailing from Liverpool for Amelia Island. Rover was carrying coals, earthenware, and hardware. Once again Gleaner was in sight. (Note: A first-class share of the prize money was worth £90 3s 2d; a sixth-class share was worth £1 7s 9 1/4d.) On the same day Ringdove captured the ship Four Sisters, of 204 tons (bm), from Lisbon, bound to New York, and laden with 1000 dollars. The next day Ringdove captured the brig Hesper, of 264 tons (bm). Hesper was sailing in ballast from Liverpool to Norfolk. The run of good fortune continued into August when on 1 August Ringdove captured three vessels. First came the Eight Sisters, bound to Boston, and sailing in ballast. Second was the Hannibal, bound to St. Bartholomew with a cargo of flour. Lastly, Ringdove captured the Orpha, which was sailing to Puerto Rico, also with a cargo of flour. At some point Ringdove also captured the San Pedro and the Marstrand.

On 2 June 1813 she sailed for the North America station. On 30 June she was one of the vessels that were present at the capture of the letter of marque Ulysses, Sam Hill, Master. Ulysses, of Massachusetts, carried eight guns and a crew of 30. Then, on 28 July, Ringdove retook the brig Stamper, which had been sailing Liverpool to Halifax.

Ringdove returned to the Jamaica station in 1814. On 1 October 1814, the Ringdove sailed for Portsmouth and arrived on 9 November 1814. On 15 October, the Ringdove sailed into a hurricane. It encountered the American schooner Decatur, which had become dismasted, which Ringdove captured and destroyed.

== Post-war ==
Ringdove remained in the West Indies until the end of 1815 when she returned to Portsmouth and was paid off there. There she underwent a major repair from January to July 1818. In August 1821 her forecastle and head were housed over. She was then fitted for sea between December 1822 and February 1823. Commander George Frederick Rich recommissioned her in November 1822 for the West Indies. (Note: For more on Commander George Frederick Rich see: O'Byrne, William R. (1849). "Rich, George Frederick" . A Naval Biographical Dictionary. London: John Murray.) Commander Edwin Ludlow Rich succeeded him in July 1823. (Note: For more on Commander Edwin Ludlow Rich see: O'Byrne, William R. (1849). "Rich, Edwin Ludlow" . A Naval Biographical Dictionary. London: John Murray.)

In August 1826 she was under Commander Edward Thornbrough at Halifax, Nova Scotia. In April 1827 command transferred to Commander Charles English.

== Fate ==
The Admiralty sold Ringdove to Samuel Cunard & Co. at Halifax for £505 on 11 June 1829. Cunard was a Nova Scotian who built up a fleet of 40 sailing vessels before founding the Cunard Line in 1840.
