= HMS Surprise (1812) =

Frigate of the Royal Navy

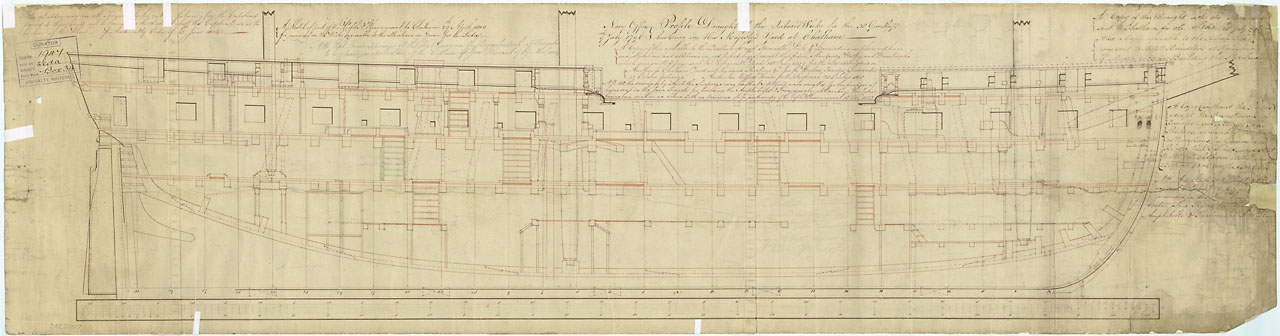
- Surprise

History

United Kingdom
- Name: HMS Surprise
- Operator: Royal Navy
- Ordered: 10 April 1809
- Builder: Milford Dockyard
- Laid down: January 1810
- Launched: 25 July 1812
- Completed: 1 December 1812
- Commissioned: September 1812
- Fate: Sold 2 October 1837

General characteristics
- Class & type: Leda-class frigate
- Tons burthen: 1072.35 (bm)
- Length: 150 ft 4 in (45.8 m) (gundeck); 125 ft 8 7/8 in (38.3 m) (keel)
- Beam: 40 ft 0 1/2 in (12.2 m)
- Depth of hold: 12 ft 9 in (3.9 m)
- Sail plan: Full-rigged ship
- Complement: 284 (later 300);
- Armament: Upper deck: 28 × 18-pounder guns; Fc: 2 × 9-pounder guns + 2 × 32-pounder carronades; QD: 8 × 9-pounder guns + 6 × 32-pounder carronades

HMS Surprise was a 38-gun frigate of the Leda class of the Royal Navy, although all these fifth-rate frigates were re-classed as 46-gun under the general re-rating of February 1817, from when carronades on the quarterdeck and forecastle were included in the rating.

Surprise was ordered on 10 April 1809 at Milford Dockyard in Pembrokeshire where her keel was laid down there in January 1810. She was launched on 25 July 1812, and sailed round to Plymouth Dockyard to be completed. Fitting out took place between 9 August and 1 December 1812, and she was commissioned in September 1812 under the command of Captain Sir Thomas John Cochrane, sailing for the West Indies on 19 December 1812.

During the War of 1812, under Cochrane's command, she served initially on the Leeward Islands, where she captured the American privateer Decatur on 16 January 1813. Decatur was pierced for 14 guns but mounted 12, and had a crew of 82 men. A shot from Surprise had wounded two men on Decatur, one of whom subsequently died. Decatur was 21 days out of Boston and but had made no captures.

Surprise, Elizabeth, Opossum, and Spider were in company on 13 March 1813 when they captured Lark. (Note: A first-class share was worth £71 14s 5½d; a sixth-class share was worth £1 1s 9¾d.)

Subsequently, Surprise served on the North American station. From June 1814, her captain was George Knight, and she was present at the bombardment of Fort McHenry in September 1814.

== Fate ==
Surprise was paid off and placed in ordinary in August or September 1815. By 1822, she had been reduced to a hulk at Milford, but was then fitted out at Plymouth as a convict hulk to be stationed at Cork, where she remained until sold (for £2,010) there in 1837.

== Notes ==
Citations
