= Pierre-Nicolas Lahalle =

French naval officer

Pierre-Nicolas Lahalle (French pronunciation: [pjɛʁ nikɔlɑ la.al]; Epreville, 1 April 1772 - Roscoff, 5 August 1828) was a French naval officer.

== Career ==
In 1809, he captained the 40-gun frigate Topaze. She was captured during the action of 22 January 1809.

In late 1812, he commanded the frigate Hortense.

== Sources and references ==
=== Bibliography ===
- Roche, Jean-Michel (2005). Dictionnaire des bâtiments de la flotte de guerre française de Colbert à nos jours, 1671 - 1870. Group Retozel-Maury Millau. p. 344. ISBN 978-2-9525917-0-6. OCLC 165892922.
- Fonds Marine. Campagnes (opérations; divisions et stations navales; missions diverses). Inventaire de la sous-série Marine BB4. Tome premier : BB4 1 à 482 (1790-1826)
- Troude, Onésime-Joachim (1867). Batailles navales de la France. Vol. 4. Challamel ainé. pp. 160–162.
- James, William (2002) [1827]. The Naval History of Great Britain, Volume 1, 1793–1796. London: Conway Maritime Press. ISBN 0-85177-905-0. OCLC 165702223.
