= Loire-class flûte =

Ship class of the French Navy

Class overview
- Name: Loire class
- Operators: French Navy
- Preceded by: Miscellaneous prizes
- Succeeded by: Dyle class
- Completed: 2
- Lost: 2

General characteristics
- Type: Flûte
- Displacement: 800 tons (French)
- Length: 43.36 m (142 ft 3 in) (gundeck); 40.11 m (131 ft 7 in) (keel)
- Beam: 10.72 m (35 ft 2 in)
- Depth of hold: 5.60 m (18 ft 4 in)
- Armament: 20 × 8-pounder guns (pierced for 24)

The Loire-class flûte was a French Navy class of two 20-gun flûtes that Louis, Antoine, and Marhurin Crucy, Basse Indre, built to a design by François-Louis Etesse, and under a contract dated 5 November 1802.

Both were at anchor at Anse à la Barque, Guadeloupe when their crews burned them on 18 December 1809 to avoid their falling into British hands during an attack by a British squadron comprising His Majesty's Ships Sceptre, Blonde, Thetis, Freya, Cygnet, Hazard, Ringdove, and Elizabeth.

British accounts of the battle generally refer to "the two armées en flute and late 40-gun frigates Loire and Seine". However, this description is a little misleading. The class were not designed as frigates, and then modified; they were designed as flûtes. Furthermore, they were lightly armed; their armament was heavy enough to deter British privateers, and small naval vessels such as schooners, cutters, and brigs, but not heavy enough to deter sloops or frigates. (Note: James states that both flûtes were armed with a mix of 18-pounder guns and 36-pounder carronades, a common British designation for the 36-pounder obusier de vaisseau. However, Demerliac agrees with Winfield and Roberts in describing Loire's armament as consisting of twenty 8-pounder guns, with the same for Seine.)

== Loire ==
Loire was laid down in November 1802 and launched on 15 October 1803. She left Nantes on 15 November 1809 in company with her classmate. Loire was under the command of lieutenant de vaisseau Joseph Lenormant-Kergré (or Lernormand Kergré), and had been transporting troops and supplies to Guadeloupe at the time of her loss. On the way she and Seine participated in the naval engagement in which the French frigates Clorinde and Renommée engaged HMS Observateur and HMS Junon, capturing Junon. Neither flûte suffered any casualties.

== Seine ==
Seine was laid down in November 1802 but not launched until 17 September 1806. She left Nantes on 15 November 1809 in company with her classmate Loire. Seine was under the command of lieutenant de vaisseau Bernard Vincent, and had been transporting troops and supplies to Guadeloupe at the time of her loss. On the way she and Loire participated in the naval engagement in which the French frigates Clorinde and Renommée engaged HMS Observateur and HMS Junon, capturing Junon. Neither flûte suffered any casualties.

== British vs. French accounts ==
James, in his report on the engagement with Junon, reports that Loire and Seine both fired their guns at Junon, one from in front and one from behind the British frigate, and that the French soldiers on the flûtes discharged their small arms, almost sweeping Junon's deck. Troude does not mention small arms, but insists that the two flûtes neither fired their cannon nor received any cannon fire.

With respect to the engagement at Anse à la Barque, Troude reports that the French vessels started to unload their cargo. When the British attacked, Vincent, on Seine, cut her masts and opened her scuttles to flood her. The water did not enter fast enough, so he fired her guns into the hold. This had the effect of starting a fire that led to the explosion that destroyed her, and set fire to Loire, destroying her also.
