= HMS Bacchus (1806) =

History

United Kingdom
- Name: HMS Bacchus
- Namesake: Greco-Roman deity Bacchus
- Ordered: 2 April 1804
- Builder: Bermuda
- Launched: early 1806
- Commissioned: 1806
- Fate: Captured by the French in August 1807

General characteristics
- Tons burthen: 11093/94 (bm)
- Length: Overall: 68 ft 2 in (20.8 m); Keel: 50 ft 5 5/8 in (15.4 m)
- Beam: 20 ft 4 in (6.2 m)
- Depth of hold: 10 ft 3 in (3.12 m)
- Sail plan: Full-rigged ship
- Complement: 35
- Armament: 10 × 18-pounder carronades

HMS Bacchus was a schooner of the Adonis class of the Royal Navy during the Napoleonic War. She was built at Bermuda using Bermudan cedar and completed in mid-1806.

A report dated 9 May 1806 stated that Bacchus was three to six weeks away from completion. Still, Bacchus was commissioned under Lieutenant George Skinner and on 9 June was in company with Tartar when Tartar captured the French brig Observateur after a chase and a slight exchange of gunfire. Observateur, of 18 guns, though pierced for 20, and with a crew of 104 men, was under the command of Captain "Crozier" (Croizé). She had left Cayenne on 15 March provisioned for a cruise of four months and in company with the French brig Argus, but had not taken anything. The Royal Navy took her into service as HMS Observateur.

Bacchus then sailed to Britain where she made good defects at Plymouth between 12 September and 29 November. She returned to the West Indies. On 27 May 1807 she captured Concord, Babcock, master. (Note: The prize money notice gives Skinner's full name as "George Augustus Elliot Skinner", but other accounts have this Skinner as the captain of Hirondelle, and in the Mediterranean. The prize money for a petty officer was £7 15s 0¼d; a seaman's share was £1 1s 7½d. By the time the money was paid captain and crew had all disappeared.)

The French captured Bacchus in August 1807 at an unknown date and under unknown circumstances.
