= French ship Musette (1781) =

Musette
History

France
- Name: Musette
- Builder: Nantes
- Launched: 1781
- Captured: 21 December 1796

Great Britain
- Name: Musette
- Acquired: By capture December 1796
- Fate: Sold August 1806

General characteristics
- Displacement: 460 tons (French)
- Tons burthen: 311 75/94 (bm)
- Length: 102 ft 0 1/2 in (31.1 m) (overall); 80 ft 9 3/8 in (24.6 m) (keel)
- Beam: 26 ft 11 1/4 in (8.2 m)
- Depth of hold: 13 ft 3 3/4 in (4.1 m)
- Complement: French service: 148 (150 at capture); British service: 125
- Armament: French service: 20 × 6-pounder guns + 6 small guns on the poop deck; At capture: 22 guns; British service: 20 × 24-pounder carronades

Musette (or Muzette) was a merchant ship built at Nantes in 1781. In June 1793 her owners commissioned her there as a 20-gun privateer, but the French Navy requisitioned her in November and classed her as a corvette. In May 1795 the Navy returned her to privateer service. HMS Hazard captured her in December 1796 and the Royal Navy took her into service as HMS Musette. She never went to sea again and the Navy sold her in 1806.

== Capture ==
On 21 December 1796 Hazard captured Musette about 30 leagues west of Cape Clear. She had taken two vessels, one of which was the Abbey, of Liverpool. Abbey had been sailing from Lisbon to Liverpool when Musette captured her. However, Daphne had recaptured Abbey and brought her in. Commander Alexander Ruddach, captain of Hazard, described Musette as a "fine coppered French Ship Privateer".

== HMS Musette ==
Musette arrived at Plymouth on 31 January 1797 and was laid up. From 1798 the Royal Navy used her as a receiving ship, but did not fit her out as such until November 1801. She was hulked that year.

Between September and October 1803 the Navy had Musette fitted out as a floating battery for service on the River Yealm. Lieutenant John Bevan commissioned Musette in November 1803. Lieutenant Dundas replaced Bevan in December 1804.

In December 1805 the transport Beaver wrecked on the rocks of Yealm Point, with the loss by drowning of four people. The Naval Chronicle reported that Lieutenant Dundas of Musette and a detachment of the Plymouth Volunteers (Prince of Wales own Royal Volunteers) deserved great credit for their efforts on 15 December to rescue people and cargo from Beaver.

In 1805 Lieutenant Thomas Simpson commanded Musette. In 1806 Lieutenant Robert B. Young replaced Simpson.

== Fate ==
The Principal Officers and Commissioners of the Navy offered the "Musette and Cerf sloops" lying at Plymouth for sale on 27 August 1806. Musette sold there on that day.
