= HMS Hazard (1794) =

Sloop of the Royal Navy

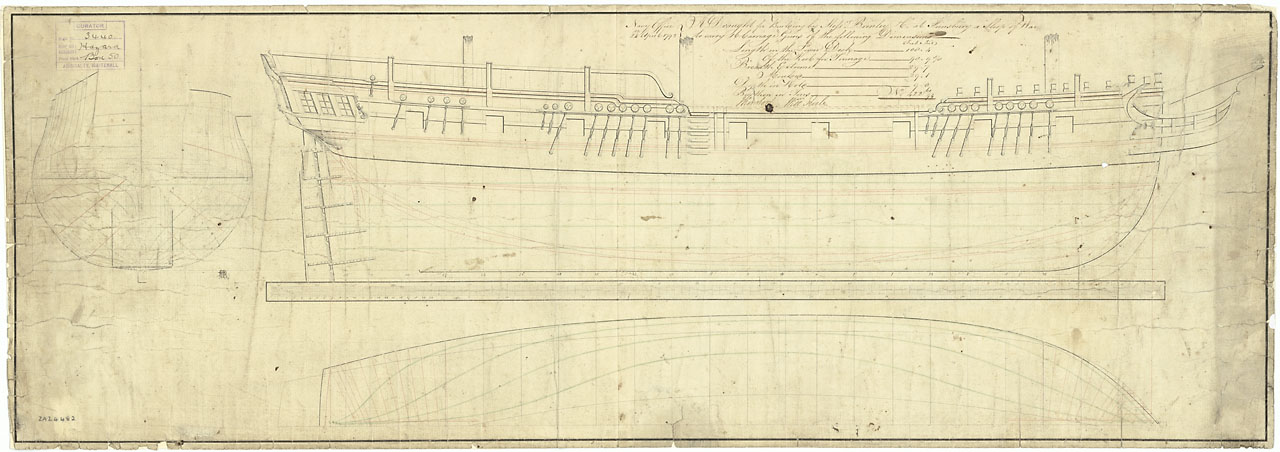
- Drawing of the Hazard, 1793

History

Great Britain
- Name: HMS Hazard
- Ordered: 18 February 1793
- Builder: Josiah & Thomas Brindley, Frindsbury
- Laid down: May 1793
- Launched: 3 March 1794
- Completed: 8 June 1794
- Commissioned: April 1794
- Stricken: sold 30 October 1817
- Honours and awards: Naval General Service Medal with clasps: "Martinique"; "Anse la Barque 18 Decr. 1809"; "Guadaloupe"

General characteristics
- Class & type: 16-gun Cormorant-class sloop
- Tons burthen: 426 14/94 (bm)
- Length: 108 ft 7 in (33.1 m) (overall), 91 ft 5/8 in (27.8 m) (keel)
- Beam: 29 ft 9 in (9.1 m)
- Depth of hold: 9 ft (2.74 m)
- Propulsion: Sails
- Sail plan: Sloop
- Complement: 121
- Armament: 16 × 6-pounder guns; 12 × 1/2-pounder swivels

HMS Hazard was a 16-gun Royal Navy Cormorant-class ship-sloop built by Josiah & Thomas Brindley at Frindsbury, Kent, and launched in 1794. She served in the French Revolutionary Wars and throughout the Napoleonic Wars. She captured numerous prizes, and participated in a notable ship action against the French frigate Topaze, as well as in several other actions and campaigns, three of which earned her crew clasps to the Naval General Service Medal. Hazard was sold in 1817.

== Construction ==
The Hazard was one of the initial batch of six ship-rigged ship sloops that the Admiralty ordered in February 1793, shortly after the outbreak of the French Revolutionary Wars, to a joint design by Sir John Henslow and William Rule. She was laid down in May 1793, launched there in March 1794, and then taken down the Medway to Chatham Naval Dockyard, where she was masted and completed in June.

== French Revolutionary Wars ==
She entered service in 1794 under Commander John Loring. Command passed rapidly, first to Commander Robert Dudley Oliver the following year and then to Commander Alexander Ruddach in 1796, who sailed her from Cork on the Irish station.

Under Ruddach she captured the French privateer Terrible on 16 July off Cape Clear Island. Hazard chased the brig for eight hours before she was able to capture Terrible. She carried 14 guns and a crew of 106 men. She was six days out of Brest but had not taken any prizes.

Then on 21 December 1796, Hazard took the privateer Musette about 30 leagues west of Cape Clear. Musette was armed with 22 guns and carried a crew of 150 men. She had taken two vessels, one of which was Abbey, of Liverpool. She had been sailing from Lisbon to Liverpool when Musette captured her. However, Daphne had recaptured Abbey and brought her in. The Navy took Musette in as HMS Musette.

Late in March, Vice-Admiral Lord Kingsmill received intelligence that a French cruiser had been seen off the Skellocks on the coast of Ireland. Kingsmill dispatched Hazard on 28 March, and on 1 April she found the French vessel. After a chase of seven hours, Hazard caught her quarry, but only because the privateer had lost both topmasts. The privateer was the brig Hardi, of 18 guns and 130 men. Hardi had been built at Cowes, about two years earlier, for the Spaniards. Hardi had left Brest on 17 March and during her cruise had escaped two British frigates that had chased her. She had captured only one prize, a small Portuguese vessel of little value. On 8 June Hazard captured the Danish brig Barbara.

Commander William Butterfield took command in July 1798. On 7 August he captured the American snow Two Brothers that a French privateer had taken three days earlier. The master of the snow gave Butterfield information that led Butterfield to try to find the privateer. On 12 August he encountered a French privateer of 24 guns and gave chase. The chase lasted two days before the French vessel jettisoned her guns and escaped. As she escaped, Butterfield sighted another vessel that seemed suspicious and approached her.

The new quarry turned out to be the French warship Neptune, with a crew of 53 and 270 soldiers on board, sailing from Île de France to Bordeaux. She was pierced for 20 guns but only carried 10. In the ensuing two-hour engagement, Neptune fought all ten guns on one side while the soldiers fired their muskets. She also attempted to board Hazard. Eventually Neptune surrendered after she had suffered 20 to 30 killed and wounded; Hazard had 6 men wounded. (Note: Roche lists her as Trompeur as that was the name under which the French took her into their service in 1794 when they took her from the Spanish and before they renamed her Neptune in 1796. He describes her as a gunboat of 12 guns. Winfield and Roberts report that Neptune was the former Spanish lugger Nettuno, originally armed with one obusier and 10 swivel guns. Marshall describes Neptune as the former East Indiaman Laurel. An East Indiaman would be more consistent with the size of Neptune than would a lugger, but the National Archives (United Kingdom), has no record of an East Indiaman named Laurel. Some records suggest that Neptune sank off Beachy Head later in 1798 due to a collision. However, the Neptune that sank there after a collision was the hired armed cutter or lugger Neptune, of six or eight 3-pounder guns, and 517/94 tons (bm). Furthermore, that collision occurred on 18 April 1798, i.e., before Hazard captured the French Neptune.) During the fight Hazard saw a French privateer in the distance that declined to get involved. As she returned to port with Neptune, Hazard saw a French privateer with an English prize, Britannia, in tow, and directed a British frigate to the scene.

Butterfield and Hazard also performed some rescue services. On one occasion he came across a transport vessel that had lost her masts and that had already run afoul of two other ships. Butterfield was able to bring her into port, thereby saving her cargo of military supplies intended for the British Army serving against the Irish rebels. Sir Robert Kingsmill, the commander in chief at Cork thanked him for his service.

On a second occasion, he rescued the East Indiaman Triton off the coast of Ireland. Severe weather had debilitated the crew of lascars, and several French privateers were in the vicinity. Hazard escorted Triton safely to Portsmouth. Later, Triton's owners, David Scott & Co., of London, presented Butterfield with a piece of plate worth 150 guineas.

In 1800 and 1801, Hazard was employed on the convoy route between Britain and Newfoundland and subsequently between Britain and Belfast. On 18 July 1801 a court martial on board Gladiator tried Lieutenant John Alexander Douglas of Hazard for being absent without leave. The charges were proved and the board ordered him to be dismissed from the Navy.

Between June and August 1802 Hazard was fitted at Portsmouth. Commander Robert I. Neave (or Neve) commissioned her in June 1802, for the Channel.

On 25 August 1802 Constance and Hazard received orders to collect Dutch troops from Lymington and take them to Cuxhaven. They sailed two days later and passed through Spithead on their way to the Elbe, reaching there on 31 August. During the Peace of Amiens, Hazard convoyed Dutch soldiers from Britain back to the Continent.

== Napoleonic Wars ==
In 1803, at the outbreak of the Napoleonic Wars, Hazard carried despatches for the Channel Fleet and then operated as part of the blockade squadron off Northern Spain. While she was on the blockade a rumour circulated first that four ships of the line, and then that four French frigates, had captured Hazard and that the French had taken her into service. However, the rumors turned out to be mistaken. Hazard was with the fleet under Admiral the Honourable William Cornwallis when Minotaur captured the French frigate Franchise on 28 May 1803.

On 19 May Naiad and Hazard captured the Danish ship Frauen Brigitta. Six days later, Victory and Hazard captured Trois Consuls. Five days later, boats from Hazard, together with boats from Naiad, cut out a new brig from among the Penmarks off Brest while under fire from French batteries. They also cut out and sank a chasse-maree. Hazard and Naiad captured the French galliot Baliena and the brig Jeanne. On 23 July Plantagenet and Hazard captured Courier de Terre Neuve.

Later, on 6 August, Hazard sent two prizes into Plymouth - a Danish brig from the West Indies and another brig that she recaptured after a privateer had captured her as she sailed from Livorno to London with a cargo of hemp, marble and oil. Hazard also kept with her as a tender a French privateer of 16 guns that Hazard had taken.

Late in 1803, Hazard returned to Britain and operated along the Northern French coast, capturing small French commercial vessels off Quiberon, Rochefort and Bordeaux.

On 22 December Hazard recaptured Mary of Runcorn, of the Port of Liverpool.

In the spring of 1804 Hazard was stationed off St Ives, Cornwall to intercept French privateers that would loiter there to prey on vessels seeking shelter in the bay. In the summer Hazard's boats cut out a French coasting sloop off Quiberon and sent her into Plymouth on 6 August. She was Colombe and carried a cargo of wheat for the victualing office at Lorient.

On 15 February 1805 Hazard captured the schooner Der Vriede. Naiad was in sight but did not take part.

Neve was promoted to Post-captain in 1806 and command passed to Commander Charles Dilkes in February 1806. Hazard, with Growler, Conflict and the hired armed brig Colpoys, captured nine chasse-marées on 27 June 1807 in the Pertuis Breton. (Note: The Pertuis Breton is the passage between the Île de Ré and the coast of Brittany.) The captured vessels were: Deux Amis (armed with two 4-pounder guns), Trois Frères Horaces (armed with four swivels, Véronique (laden with wheat), Sans Pareil (laden with wheat), Marie Françoise (in ballast), Marie Louise (in ballast), Bon Janton (in ballast), Pascal (in ballast), and Gaulle (in ballast). Their crews escaped on shore with all their papers. The crew of a tenth chasse maree scuttled their vessel to prevent the British from capturing her. The British drove six on to the shore, one of which was armed with six guns. In addition, between 1 April and 10 June the small squadron captured and destroyed two sloops, Rosalie and Jeune Marie, and five chasse marees: Petite Marie, Patriote, Marianne, Belle Louise Josephine, and Marie Françoise. Colpoys escorted the prizes back to Plymouth. Lastly, French shore batteries sank one chasse maree, of unknown name, after the British had captured her.

On 2 October 1807 Hazard's first lieutenant, William Berry, 22 years old, went before a court martial on charges that he had committed a homosexual offense with Thomas Gibbs, who was a boy serving on Hazard. The board found Berry guilty. Seventeen days later Berry was hanged from Hazard's starboard foreyard-arm. Unfortunately the hanging was botched in that the knot twisted under his chin. Berry had a 32-pound shot tied to his legs but still it took 15 minutes for him to strangle to death. He appears to have been one of only two naval officers hanged for buggery during the Napoleonic Wars (the other was Captain Henry Allen of the sloop Rattler.)

On 16 November Hazard sailed for the West Indies.

In early 1809, Hazard was sent to the West Indies to operate as part of the squadron under Admiral Sir Alexander Cochrane and command passed to Commander Hugh Cameron, late of Achates, while Dilkes removed to the flagship, Neptune.

On 22 January, Hazard spotted the French 40-gun frigate Topaze off Guadeloupe. Hazard was initially unable to catch up with Topaze but eventually took part in the action of 22 January 1809 at which Cleopatra, with the assistance of several other vessels, captured the French ship. The British took Topaze into the navy as Jewel.

Hazard subsequently participated in the Invasion of Martinique. In 1847 the Admiralty awarded all surviving claimants from the campaign the Naval General Service Medal with clasp "Martinique".

In April 1809, a strong French squadron arrived at the Îles des Saintes, south of Guadeloupe. There they were blockaded until 14 April, when a British force under Major-General Frederick Maitland and Captain Philip Beaver in Acasta, invaded and captured the islands. Hazard was among the naval vessels that shared in the proceeds of the capture of the islands. (Note: The prize agent for a number of the vessels involved, Henry Abbott, went bankrupt. In May 1835 there was a final payment of a dividend from his estate. A first-class share was worth 10s 2 3/4d; a sixth-class share, that of an ordinary seaman, was worth 1d. Seventh-class (landsmen) and eighth-class (boys) shares were fractions of a penny, too small to pay.)

On 14 April British troops from Martinique under Major General Maitland landed in the Saintes and the French squadron made preparations to sail during the night. James Robertson, first lieutenant of Hazard, took a rowboat into the harbour during the night and attached a grappling hook to the stern of one of the French vessels. When the vessel started to sail, Robertson used lights and blue rockets to signal the French squadron's departure. The British took up the chase. This led to the action of 14–17 April, which resulted in the defeat of the French squadron. During the engagement, Recruit harried D'Hautpoul until Pompee and Castor could capture her. However, because Hazard had joined the pursuit, it was 53 days before Robertson and his crew could rejoin their vessel, and change their clothes.

On 16 October Hazard and Pelorus were in company when they came upon the French privateer schooner Général Ernouf moored under the guns of the battery of St. Marie on the east coast of the southern part of Guadeloupe. Hazard and Pelorus attempted to send in a cutting out party during the night, but the boats could not find a channel. The British went in again in the daylight despite fire from the battery and the schooner's long 18-pounder pivot-gun and two swivels. Fire from Hazard and Pelorus silenced the batteries but as the British came alongside the French crew, an estimated 80-100 men, fled ashore. There two field guns joined them in firing on the cutting-out party. Because the schooner was aground and chained to the shore the boarding party could not bring her out; instead, they set fire to her. However, a premature explosion injured some of them. In all, Hazard lost three men killed and four wounded; Pelorus lost three killed and five wounded.

On 17 December Hazard was part of a squadron that engaged a French reinforcement convoy at Basseterre. The French failed to reach Guadeloupe and the next day HMS Blonde and HMS Thetis entered Anse de la Barque and attacked the two French flûtes, the 20-gun Loire and the 20-gun Seine. After putting up a strong defense, the French crews set fire to their vessels to keep them out of British hands. Cameron led the landing party that stormed the batteries but was killed on the beach immediately thereafter. Robertson was appointed commander pro tem of Hazard until a successor to Cameron could arrive from Halifax. Unfortunately for Robertson, Commander William Elliott of the brig Pultusk requested command of Hazard, which he received effective 25 December 1809. The 1847 the action earned the British participants the Naval General Service Medal with clasp "Anse la Barque 18 Decr. 1809".

In early 1810, Hazard took part in the Invasion of Guadeloupe. During the invasion, Hazard led the fleet into Anse de Barque, arriving well before the other vessels. There she saw a French schooner anchored under the batteries and on fire. Robertson and a boarding party of marines boarded the burning schooner Mouche despite fire from the shore batteries that were trying either to sink them or the schooner. By the time Robertson was able to board the schooner part of her deck had burnt away; while the boarding party was cutting away her masts the intense heat discharged all her guns. Still the boarding party was able to bring her out and to seize the French "general marine signal book", the signals of France's allies and other important documents that she had just brought out with her from France. This campaign also earned Hazard's crew the clasp "Guadaloupe" to the Naval General Service Medal. Hazard was then sent back to Britain.

On 15 June 1810, Hazard sailed for Newfoundland. Command passed to Commander John Cookesley in December 1810. On 23 March 1811 Hazard again sailed for Newfoundland.

== War of 1812 ==
Hazard overwintered in Ferryland, Newfoundland, in the winter of 1811 and 1812. She was scheduled to depart St. John's, Newfoundland, with "the Trade for England" on 10 July 1812.

Cookesley took Hazard to the West Indies during 1812 where reportedly she took a number of American vessels as prizes. These included the Elizabeth and the Nancy on 15 July, the Orient on 19 July 1812. On 7 September 1812 Hazard captured the American ship Enterprize. Prize money was paid in June 1815. At the end of the wars in 1815 Cookesley brought her back to Spithead.

In 1816, Hazard sailed to Newfoundland, but returned the following year.

== Fate ==
Hazard was sold to Mr. Sprately for £1,010 at Portsmouth on 30 October 1817.
