= French frigate Junon (1806) =

Gloire-class 40-gun frigate of the French Navy

History

France
- Name: Junon
- Ordered: 26 March 1805
- Laid down: March 1805, Le Havre
- Launched: 16 August 1806
- Captured: 10 February 1809

United Kingdom
- Name: Junon
- Acquired: 10 February 1809
- Captured: 13 December 1809
- Fate: Scuttled by fire

General characteristics
Type	Frigate
Tons burthen	1148 bm
Length	46 metres (151 ft)
Beam	12 metres (39 ft)
Draught	7 metres (23 ft)
Complement	330 men
Armament	40 guns: Battery: 28 × 18-pounder long guns; Quarterdeck and forecastle: 12 × 8-pounder long guns
Armour	Timber

The Junon was a Gloire class 40-gun frigate of the French Navy. Launched in 1806, she saw service during the Napoleonic Wars, escorting merchant convoys to France's besieged Caribbean colonies. In February 1809 she was captured at sea after a fierce engagement with four Royal Navy vessels.

Recommissioned as HMS Junon, she served as part of the British blockade of French ports in the Caribbean. French frigates recaptured her in December 1809 off the French colony of Guadeloupe. The engagement so damaged Junon that her captors scuttled her.

== Capture by Britain ==
On 10 November 1808, under capitaine de frégate Rousseau, Junon departed Cherbourg for Martinique, along with Vénus, Amphitrite, Cygne and Papillon. The squadron broke apart the next day, and she found herself isolated. On 10 February 1809 she ran across a British squadron composed of the frigates HMS Horatio and HMS Latona, the brig HMS Driver, and the schooner HMS Superieure off the Virgin Islands; Junon surrendered after a lengthy resistance that left the ship entirely dismasted and with more than half her crew killed. The British towed her to Halifax, Nova Scotia for repair. There she was commissioned into the Royal Navy as the 38-gun HMS Junon.

== Recapture by France ==
Her repairs completed, Junon returned to the Caribbean in September 1809 under the command of Captain John Shortland, under orders to enforce a naval blockade of French-controlled Guadeloupe.

At 2.15pm on 13 December, Junon was in company with the 14-gun sloop-of-war HMS Observateur when her crew sighted four unknown ships heading west towards the French colony. Both British vessels turned to intercept, with Observateur in the lead. The four unknown vessels were swiftly identified as frigates rather than merchantmen. Commander Wetherall of Observateur signaled this information to Junon and ordered his own ship cleared for action.

By sunset, the two British ships were within long range of the unknown ships. Observateur fired a warning shot in their direction and both she and Junon moved to close with the lead frigate preparatory to engaging them. However, as the British ships approached, the lead frigate ran up a Spanish flag, shortly followed by the British Red Ensign. Believing the unknown ships to be Spanish allies, Wetherall and Shortland reduced sail and Junon moved to come alongside the lead frigate to permit Captain Shortland to exchange greetings with her captain.

At 5.50pm, when Junon was "within Half Pistol Shott" of the lead frigate, that vessel suddenly hauled down its Spanish and British flags and raised the French ensign. The following three vessels followed suit, and all four vessels opened fire on Junon at short range. Junon's crew were taken by surprise; a ragged retaliatory broadside struck two of the French ships but caused little damage. Junon herself received broadsides to her port, starboard, and stern and quickly became indefensible; her crew surrendered at 7pm when French soldiers boarded their ship. A total of 15 British sailors were killed and 44 wounded, including Shortland, who was hit by musket fire and then struck through the body by wood splinters torn from the deck by cannon fire. (Note: Other sources record 90 casualties among a crew of 200.)

The British sloop Observateur had fired upon the French when the engagement began but Junon's capture was too swift for her to directly assist her sister ship. Instead, as Junon seemed lost Wetherall ordered that Observateur make sail and escape to the west.

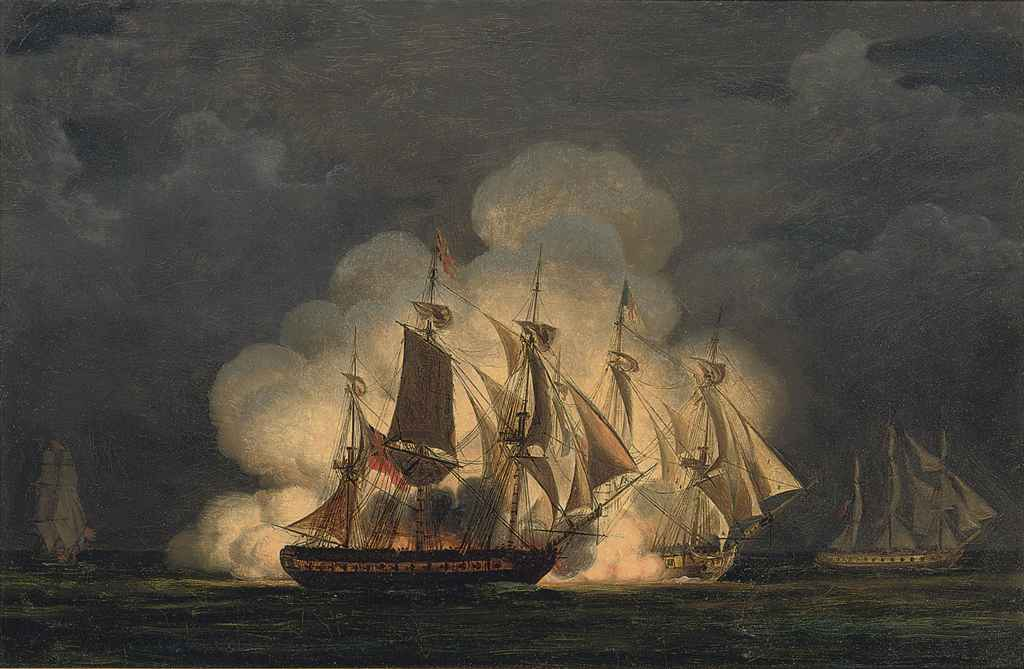
A naval engagement at night, an action between HMS Junon and the French frigates Renommée and Clorinde, 13 December 1809

The French vessels were the frigates Clorinde and Renommée, and the lightly armed flûtes Loire and Seine, en route to Guadeloupe with supplies and reinforcements for the colony. (Note: Collectively, the four vessels carried 340 soldiers of the French 66th Regiment, 700 tons of food including flour, salted beef, pork, rice and butter, 140 hogsheads of wine and 45,000 yards of cloth. Smaller cargo items included gun-carriages, shoes, tinware and coal.) Overall command rested with Captain Dominque Roquebert aboard Clorinde. Roquebert's logs indicate he had not initially intended to engage the British, and had raised the Spanish flag in the hope that they would leave his ships alone. However, when Junon and Observateur drew near, Roquebert decide to continue with the ruse of the false flag to lure the British into range of all four French vessels at the same time. The French suffered 80 casualties, including 34 killed. All casualties were from among the crews of Clorinde and Renommée which had come alongside Junon during the battle. Loire and Seine had engaged the British ship from the rear and had not come under fire from either Junon or Observateur.

== Fate ==
Junon remained afloat following her battle with Roquebert's ships, but her condition was unsalvageable. On 14 December Roquebert ordered that the surviving British crew be brought aboard the French vessels as prisoners. Later that day her captors set fire to Junon and she sank in waters east of Guadeloupe.

Roquebert had Junon's erstwhile captain, John Shortland, conveyed to a hospital in Guadeloupe for medical care. He underwent several operations and the amputation of his right leg and part of one hand, but died of his wounds on 21 January 1810. He was buried with military honours in the French cemetery at Basse-Terre.
