= Volant Vashon Ballard =

Rear-Admiral Volant Vashon Ballard CB
- Born: c. 4 January 1774; Ludlow, Shropshire
- Died: 12 October 1832 (aged 58); Walcot, Bath, Somerset
- Military career
- Allegiance: United Kingdom
- Branch: Royal Navy
- Service years: 1786–1832
- Rank: Rear-Admiral
- Commands: HMS Hobart; HMS Carysfort; HMS Jason; HMS De Kuyter; HMS Berschermer; HMS Blonde; HMS Statira
- Conflicts: Napoleonic Wars

Volant Vashon Ballard CB (bapt. 4 January 1774 – 12 October 1832) was a Rear-Admiral of the Royal Navy. He served as a midshipman with George Vancouver on his voyage to the north-west coast of America.

== Early career ==
Christened on 4 January 1774 at Ludlow, Shropshire, he was the second son of Humphrey Ballard and his wife Sarah (née Vashon). Ballard began his Royal Navy career as captain's servant to his uncle, Captain (later Admiral) James Vashon on Expedition in April 1786. The Expedition was the flagship of Commodore (later Rear-admiral) Alan Gardner. After four months Ballard moved with Vashon and Gardner to Europa based at Jamaica and it was here that he first met Lieutenant George Vancouver. Ballard's next posting was to Astraea under Captain Peter Rainier (whose sister was the second wife of James Vashon). Ballard remained on the ship for a year before following Rainier to Monarch in June 1790 and eight months later on 28 February 1791 he joined Vancouver's expedition. He spent the entire voyage on Discovery beginning as an able seaman, then as a midshipman from 1 June 1791 until 1 December 1792 when he transferred to be a clerk before again becoming a midshipman from 1 December 1794.^{[a]}

== Command ==
After the Discovery voyage, Ballard passed his lieutenant's examination and was immediately commissioned on 6 November 1795. On 25 December 1798, while commanding the sloop Hobart, on the East India station, Ballard was promoted to captain and transferred to the 28-gun frigate Carysfort with which he remained until mid-1800. Ballard commanded the 36-gun fifth rate Jason for two months in mid-1801. He then took over command of the 8-gun De Kuyter in December 1801 and sailed her to the West Indies to be based at Antigua from August 1803 to mid-1804. For nearly two years, Ballard's next command was the 50-gun Berschermer before he, in July 1806, recommissioned Blonde, a 38-gun frigate captured from the French in 1782 and initially named Hebe.

Ballard departed in a convoy to the West Indies on 7 January 1807, and during that year captured seven French privateers including La Dame Villaret and Hortenseiun in August, Hirondelle and Duquesne (a former British warship), in September and Alert in October. At the end of 1809, Blonde was part of a light squadron off Basseterre in the blockade of Guadeloupe. It is probably as a result of his actions over that period that the merchants of Barbados presented him with a silver-plated tureen, four corner dishes and silver forks.

On 18 December 1809, Commodore Samuel James Ballard (no relation of Volant) in Sceptre assumed charge of the squadron. Two French ships were discovered moored in a strong position in Anse-la-Barque. Blonde was deputed to lead the attack and bore the brunt of the action, which left the enemy frigates in flames. A fuller account of this action can be found in The Naval History of Great Britain. The action led to the capture of Guadeloupe and Volant Ballard was honourably mentioned. Two paintings depicting the action were bequeathed by Ballard in his will to his son Edward Humphrey.

Ballard's last active service was briefly to captain HMS Statira from 1810 to 1811.

== Family and later life ==
On his return to England, he married Arabella Sarah Crabb, eldest daughter of James Crabb of Shedfield Lodge, Hampshire and Arabella Sarah Grove Boucher, daughter of Richard Boucher of Corsham, Wiltshire, on 18 September 1811 at Droxford, Hampshire. The Ballards had the following children:

- Sarah Arabella (1812), married Captain later Admiral James Vashon Baker RN, son of Joseph Baker who had also sailed with George Vancouver on the voyage to the Northwest coast of America.
- Harriett Vashon (1814) married Reverend Edward Elton.
- Volant Vashon (1816) married Emily Sarah Spencer Phillips.
- James Boucher (1817) (became a captain in the Royal Navy in 1868).
- Edward Humphrey (1819) became the Roman Catholic chaplain in the Royal Navy.
- and George Frederick (1823) became a Roman Catholic priest.

Ballard was made a Companion of the Bath in 1815 and obtained his flag rank (rear-admiral) in May 1825 reaching Rear-Admiral of the Red by seniority before his death at his home in Cavendish Terrace, Walcot near Bath on 12 October 1832. He was buried at the church of St Saviour, Walcot, Somerset.

== Notes ==
a. During the voyage Ballard kept a log now held in The National Archives, London under reference ADM 55/29 Discovery, 1 March 1791 – 2 July 1795.
