= HMS Spider (1806) =

Sloop of the Royal Navy

History

United Kingdom
- Name: HMS Spider
- Acquired: 1806 by purchase of a prize
- Fate: Broken up 1815

General characteristics
- Tons burthen: 269 (bm)
- Complement: 85
- Armament: 14 × 18-pounder carronades + 2 ×6-pounder chase guns

HMS Spider was a brig-rigged Spanish sloop that the British Royal Navy captured in 1806 and took into service. She served in the Mediterranean and the West Indies and captured a small number of merchantmen. She was broken up in 1815.

== Capture ==
On 4 April 1806 HMS Renommee came upon a Spanish naval brig anchored under Fort Callcretes on the Cape de Gatte. Renommee was able to capture the brig despite coming under fire from the brig, shore batteries, and two gun boats. The captured brig was the Vigilante, armed with twelve 12-pounder long guns and six short 24-pounder guns. She had a crew of 109 men under the command of Teniento de Navio Don Joseph Julian. British casualties amounted to two men wounded; Spanish casualties were one man killed and three men wounded. Vigilante's main mast went overboard shortly after the engagement ended, and her foremast almost did. Renommee therefore took her under tow and brought her into port.

== Royal Navy ==
The Royal Navy took Vigilante into service as HMS Spider. Lieutenant William Oliver commissioned her in 1808. He was already her commander by that time as on 17 July 1807 he had captured Frederica Johanna and on 10 September Trende Broder. Around 1808 Spider carried Lieutenant Donat Henchy O'Brien to Malta.

On 10 May 1810 Hope, Butler, master, arrived in Malta. She had been sailing from Portsmouth when she was captured, but Spider had recaptured her.

Commander Frank (or Francis) Gore Wilcock (or Willock) took command of Spider in 1812, while she was still in the Mediterranean. He sailed her to the West Indies. On 29 June 1812 Spider captured Mary, sailing to America with a cargo of sugar, rum, coffee, and molasses. On 22 September Spider captured the American ship Charles the Twelfth. (Note: A first-class share of the salvage money for Charles the Twelfth was worth £265 13s and 11¼d; a sixth-class share, that of an ordinary seaman, was worth £7 3s 4½d.)

On 20 March 1813 William, Cunningham, master, was on her way from St John's New Brunswick, to Barbados when the United States privateer General Armstrong captured William within sight of Barbados. General Armstrong took William into Puerto Rico. Spider, Captain Willock, claimed her there. The authorities gave William up and she arrived at St Thomas's on 19 April. (The actual date of William's release was 9 April. (Note: A first-class share of the salvage money for William was worth £60 17s and 7½d; a sixth-class share was worth £1 12s 6¾d. In 1832 there was a second payment, remitted from Antigua. A first class share was worth £127 16s 6d; a sixth-class share was worth £3 13s 6d.)

On 18 June Spider captured Flora and on 15 July Spider captured Ann.

In late 1813 the Admiralty ordered her to St John's, Antigua, to serve as a guard and receiving ship.

Lieutenant Robert Caulfield took command of Spider in November 1814 for the North American station. However, she returned to the West Indies in 1815.

On 10 February 1815 Spider took and sent into Antigua Amelia, Salomon, master, which had been sailing from Guadeloupe to Halifax.

== Fate ==
Spider was broken up in 1815 at Antigua.
