= French frigate Clorinde (1808) =

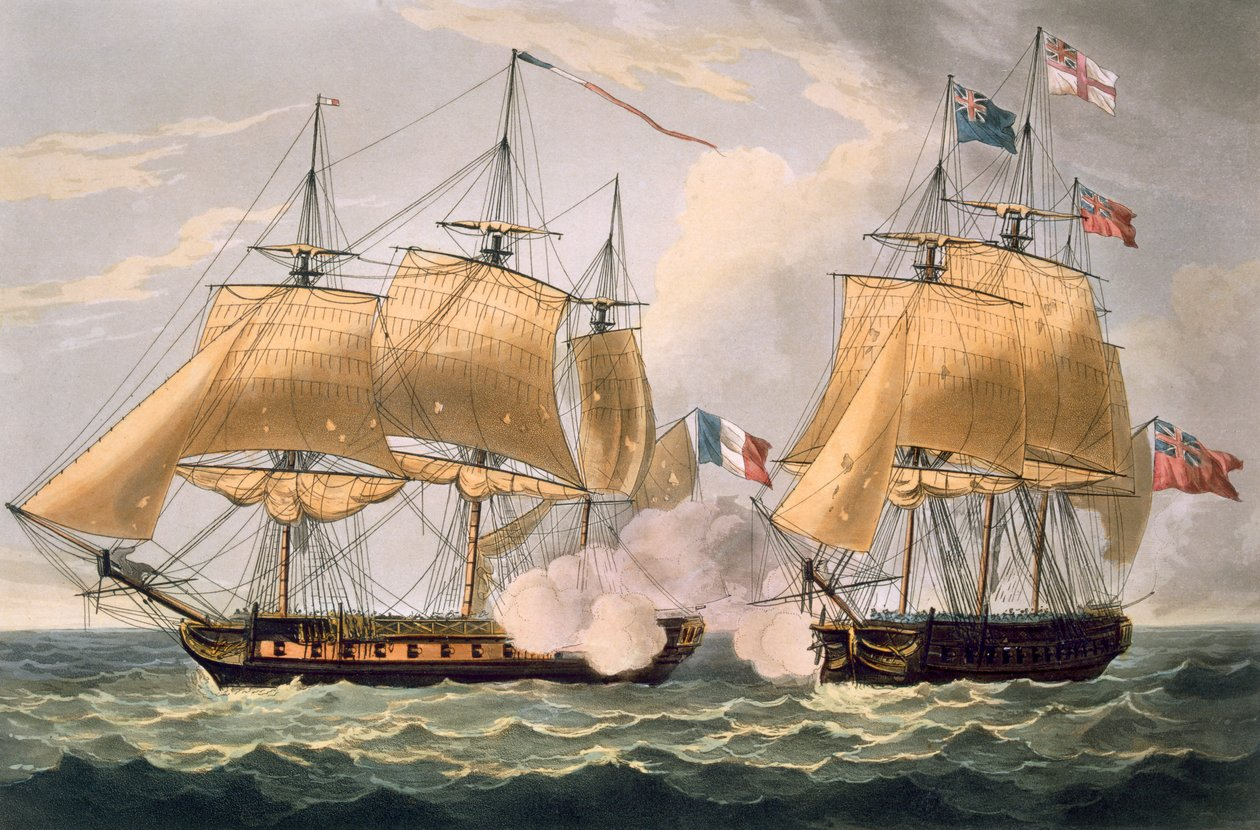
- Clorinde fighting HMS Eurotas

History

France
- Name: Clorinde
- Namesake: Clorinda
- Laid down: 19 July 1806
- Launched: 1808
- Captured: 26 February 1814

United Kingdom
- Name: HMS Aurora
- Acquired: 26 February 1814
- Fate: Broken up on 24 April 1851

General characteristics
- Class & type: Pallas-class frigate
- Displacement: 1,080 tonnes
- Length: 46.93 m (154 ft 0 in)
- Beam: 11.91 m (39 ft 1 in)
- Draught: 5.9 m (19 ft 4 in)
- Propulsion: 1,950 m^{2} (21,000 sq ft) of sail
- Complement: 326
- Armament: Nominally 40 guns; In practice carried either 44 or 46 guns: Battery: 28 18-pounders; Quarterdeck & forecastle: 8 × 8-pounder long guns; 8 × 36-pounder carronades or 12 × 18-pounder carronades

Clorinde was a 40-gun Pallas-class frigate of the French Navy designed by Jacques-Noël Sané. The Royal Navy captured her in 1814 and renamed her HMS Aurora. After serving 19 years as a coal hulk she was eventually broken up in 1851.

== French frigate ==
From June 1809, she was stationed with the 16-gun Milan and the 38-gun Renommée. In September, she sailed with Renommée, Loire, and Seine to Guadeloupe.

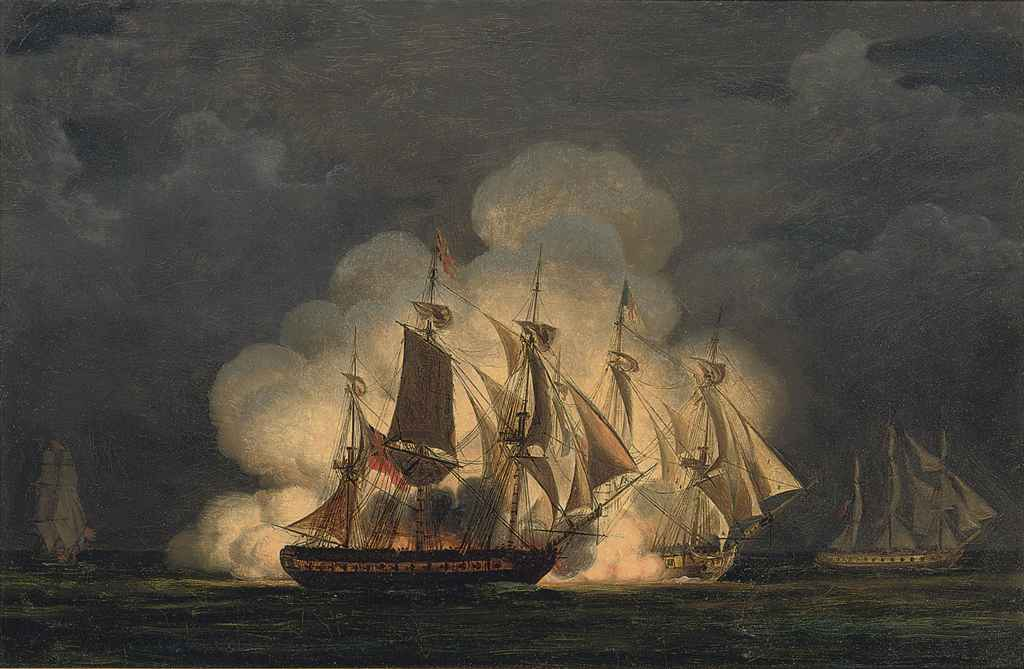
A naval engagement at night, an action between HMS Junon and the French frigates Renommée and Clorinde, 13 December 1809

On 13 December, she and Renommée captured HMS Junon.

On 15 December 1809, Clorinde ran aground, and freed herself by dropping guns and ammunition overboard.

She took part in the action of 20 May 1811, fought off Madagascar, and returned to Brest. Captain Jacques Saint-Cricq was found guilty of failing to properly support his commodore. Saint-Cricq was demoted of rank, expelled from the Legion of Honour, and sentenced to three years in prison.

On 6 December 1813, Clorinde captured the British merchant vessel Lusitania in the Atlantic Ocean (44°30′N 10°30′W). Lusitania, Johnston, master, had been sailing from London to Suriname. Clorinde then put the crews of four other vessels that she had captured aboard Lusitania and sent her into Plymouth. The other four were:

- Blenden Hall, of 473 tons (bm), Barr, master, which had been sailing from London to Bermuda;
- John O'Gaunt, of 426 tons (bm), P. Inglis, master, which had been sailing from London to Martinique;
- Aurora, Scheidt, master, which had been sailing to Amelia Island; and,
- Superb, R. Roberts, of 130 tons (bm), which had been sailing from Gibraltar to England.

Clorinde abandoned Blenden Hall at sea, where the Falmouth packet Eliza, homeward bound from Malta, found her floating. HMS Challenger brought Blenden Hall into Plymouth. They arrived on 19 December, on the same day as Lusitania.

On 18 February 1814 Clorinde captured the Post Office Packet Service packet Townshend, Captain James Cock, at 48°30′N 9°00′W. Although Captain Denis Lagarde, flew Portuguese colours in an attempt to trick Cock, Cock surmised that the frigate was French, not Portuguese, and threw his mails overboard before the Frenchmen boarded Townshend. Clorinde sank Townshend.

On 25 February 1814, at 47°40′N 9°30′W, the 38-gun HMS Eurotas chased Clorinde. A violent fight ensued for two hours and 20 minutes that left both ships dismasted, Eurotas suffering 20 killed and 30 wounded (including Captain John Phillimore), and Clorinde, 40 killed and 80 wounded. During the night, the ships built jury rigs and resumed the pursuit the next day, when HMS Dryad and HMS Achates intervened. The helpless Clorinde struck after the first cannon shot from Dryad, which towed Clorinde into Portsmouth. (Note: In 1847 the Admiralty awarded the surviving claimants from Eurotas the Naval General Service Medal with clasp "Eurotas 25 Feby. 1814".)

== British frigate ==
Clorinde was brought into British service as HMS Aurora. She served off South America during the years 1821–25, and in the Caribbean, 1826–28.

== Fate ==
From January 1832, she was used as a coal hulk in Falmouth. She was eventually broken up in May 1851.
