= Invasion of Guadeloupe (1810) =

1810 invasion of the Caribbean campaign of 1803–1810

- Part of the Caribbean campaign of 1803–1810
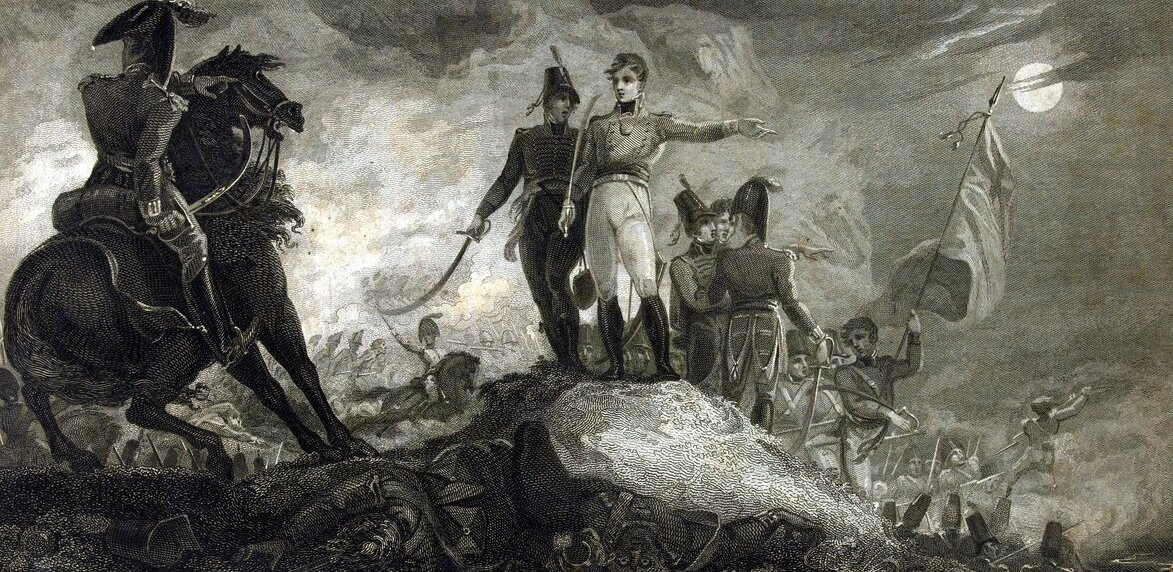
- 1810 illustration of the invasion
| Date | 28 January – 6 February 1810 |
| Location | Guadeloupe, French West Indies |
| Result | British victory |

Belligerents
| United Kingdom | France |

Commanders and leaders
| Alexander Cochrane | Jean Ernouf (surrendered) |

Strength
| 6,700; 3 ships of the line | 3,000–4,000 |

Casualties and losses
| 52 killed 250 wounded 7 missing | 500–600 killed or wounded 2,500–3,500 captured |

The invasion of Guadeloupe was a British amphibious operation fought between 28 January and 6 February 1810 over control of the Caribbean island of Guadeloupe during the Napoleonic Wars. The island was the final remaining French colony in the Americas, following the systematic invasion and capture of the others during 1809 by British forces. During the Napoleonic Wars, the French colonies had provided protected harbours for French privateers and warships, which could prey on the numerous British trade routes in the Caribbean and then return to the colonies before British warships could react. In response, the British instituted a blockade of the islands, stationing ships off every port and seizing any vessel that tried to enter or leave. With trade and communication made dangerous by the British blockade squadrons, the economies and morale of the French colonies began to collapse, and in the summer of 1808 desperate messages were sent to France requesting help.

Despite repeated efforts, the French Navy failed to reinforce and resupply the garrison, as their ships were intercepted and defeated either in European waters or in the Caribbean itself. The British had intercepted a number of these messages, and launched a series of successful invasions during 1809, until Guadeloupe was the only French colony remaining. A British expeditionary force landed on 28 January 1810, and found that much of the island's militia garrison had deserted. Advancing from two landing beaches on opposite sides of the island, they were able to rapidly push inland. It was not until they reached Beaupère–St. Louis Ridge outside the capital Basse-Terre that the expeditionary force faced strong opposition, but in a battle lasting for most of 3 February, the French were defeated and driven back. The island's commander, Jean Augustin Ernouf, began surrender negotiations the following day.

== Background ==
During the Napoleonic Wars, the French West Indies were almost completely cut off from France due to Royal Navy blockades established as a result of Britain's command of the sea. The blockades not only severely hindered trade and communication between Metropolitan France and French colonies but also prevented the colonies from being sent military reinforcements. Consequently, the French West Indies began to suffer from food shortages and stagnant economies, severely eroding public and military morale. By 1808, the situation had grown so desperate that the governors of Martinique and Guadeloupe sent a series of urgent messages to France in the summer of that year requesting military reinforcements and foodstuffs. The French government responded with by sending warships either operating independently or in small squadrons to the West Indies; though a few ships reached their destinations most were captured by the British at sea. Those few that arrived safely were trapped there as they were unable to make the return journey without being intercepted by waiting British warships.

The British had intercepted a number of the messages sent to France, and the decision was made to invade and capture the French West Indies before substantial reinforcements could arrive. During the winter of 1808, ships and troops from across the Caribbean began gathering off Barbados under the command of Vice-Admiral Sir Alexander Cochrane and Lieutenant General George Beckwith, with the intention of invading Martinique early in 1809. A smaller force was sent to Cayenne, which was invaded and captured in early January 1809. In late January the invasion of Martinique began, and despite resistance in the central highlands, the island fell to the invaders in 25 days.

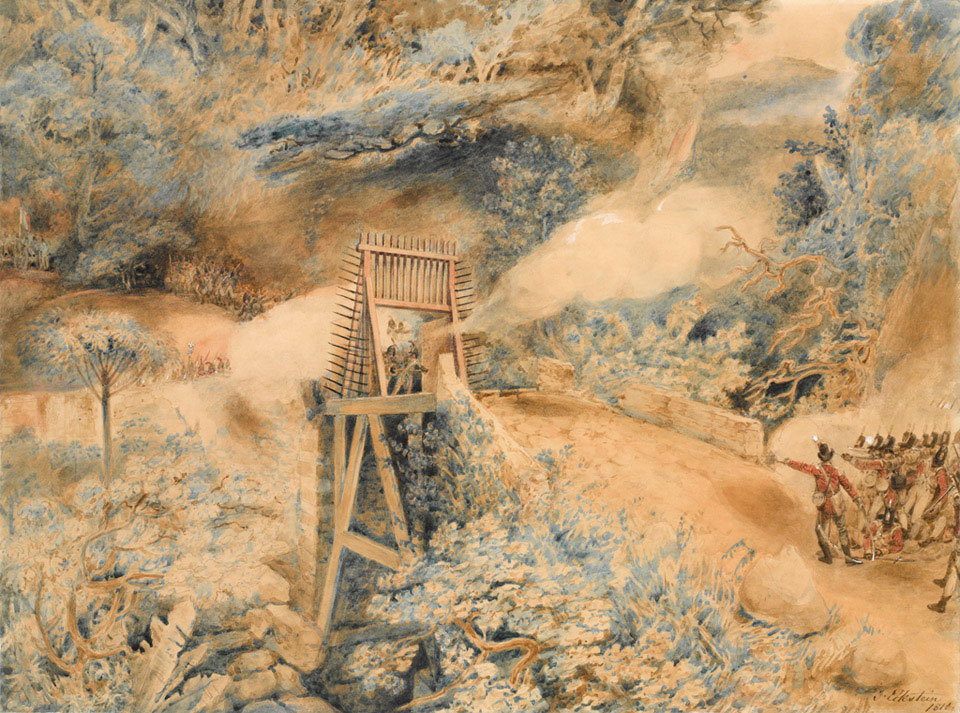
The 3rd West India Regiment engaging French troops during the British invasion of the Îles des Saintes on 14 April 1809

Cochrane then split his attention, sending a number of ships and men to aid the Spanish in the Siege of Santo Domingo while still maintaining a strong blockade force in the Leeward Islands. In April 1809, a strong reinforcement squadron of three ship of the line and two frigates "en flute" with supplies arrived at the Îles des Saintes, south of Guadeloupe. There they were blockaded until 14 April, when a British force under Major-General Frederick Maitland invaded and captured the islands. The French squadron managed to escape during the following night, and the three ships of the line went to the north with the British following. Behind them, the two French frigates went for Basse-Terre on Guadeloupe with their supplies and reinforcements. Later the three ship of the line split up and the D'Hautpoul was captured after three days close to the south coast of Puerto Rico while the other two escaped to France. The two French frigates were trapped in Basse-Terre. In June, the frigates attempted to return to France. Only one of the frigates escaped the blockade squadron, although the escapee was also captured a month later in the North Atlantic.

Subsequent French attempts to supply their one remaining colony on Guadeloupe were minor, most of the brigs sent were seized without reaching the island. The only significant attempt, launched in November 1809, achieved initial success in the destruction of the British frigate HMS Junon on 13 December, but ultimately failed when the two armed storeships, Loire and Seine were destroyed on 18 December in a battle with a British squadron off the southern coast of Guadeloupe. During the autumn and winter, British forces were collected from across the Caribbean at Fort Royal, Martinique, under Cochrane and Beckwith for the invasion of Guadeloupe.

== Preparations ==
Beckwith mustered 6,700 men from a variety of garrisons and sources, his men belonging to the 3rd, 4th, 6th and 8th West India Regiments, the 1st Foot, 15th Foot, 19th Foot, 25th Foot, 63rd Foot, 90th Foot and the Royal York Rangers, as well as 300 garrison artillerymen and various militia forces. These troops were split into two divisions: the largest, 3,700 men under Beckwith with subordinate command given to Major General Thomas Hislop, was to be deployed at Le Gosier on the island's southern shore. The second division, 2,450 men under Brigadier General George Harcourt, was initially ordered to wait on the Îles des Saintes before being deployed after the main attack to the rear of the French garrison. A small reserve under Brigadier General Charles Wale would follow the main assault to provide support if required. As the French had no significant naval resources on the island, the Royal Navy's contribution was much smaller than that required for the Martinique invasion the year before. Cochrane attached ships of the line to both divisions, Beckwith sailing in Cochrane's flagship HMS Pompee, accompanied by HMS Abercrombie with Commodore William Charles Fahie, while Harcourt sailed with Commodore Samuel James Ballard in HMS Sceptre. Ballard and Fahie were in command of the transports and smaller vessels that carried the invasion forces and bore responsibility for ensuring that the amphibious landings were successful as well as for any naval units that participated in the land campaign.

The French defenders of the island were weakened by years of isolation caused by the British blockade. Although the available French troops numbered between 3,000 and 4,000, there was an epidemic on the island and a significant proportion of the garrison, consisting principally of the 66th Line Infantry Regiment, were unfit for duty. Apart from the capital, the rest of the island's defences were manned by a militia formed from local inhabitants, among whom morale was low and desertion rates high. Military and food stores of all kinds were in short supply and the governor, General Jean Augustin Ernouf was unable to maintain garrisons around the island's extensive perimeter.

== Invasion ==
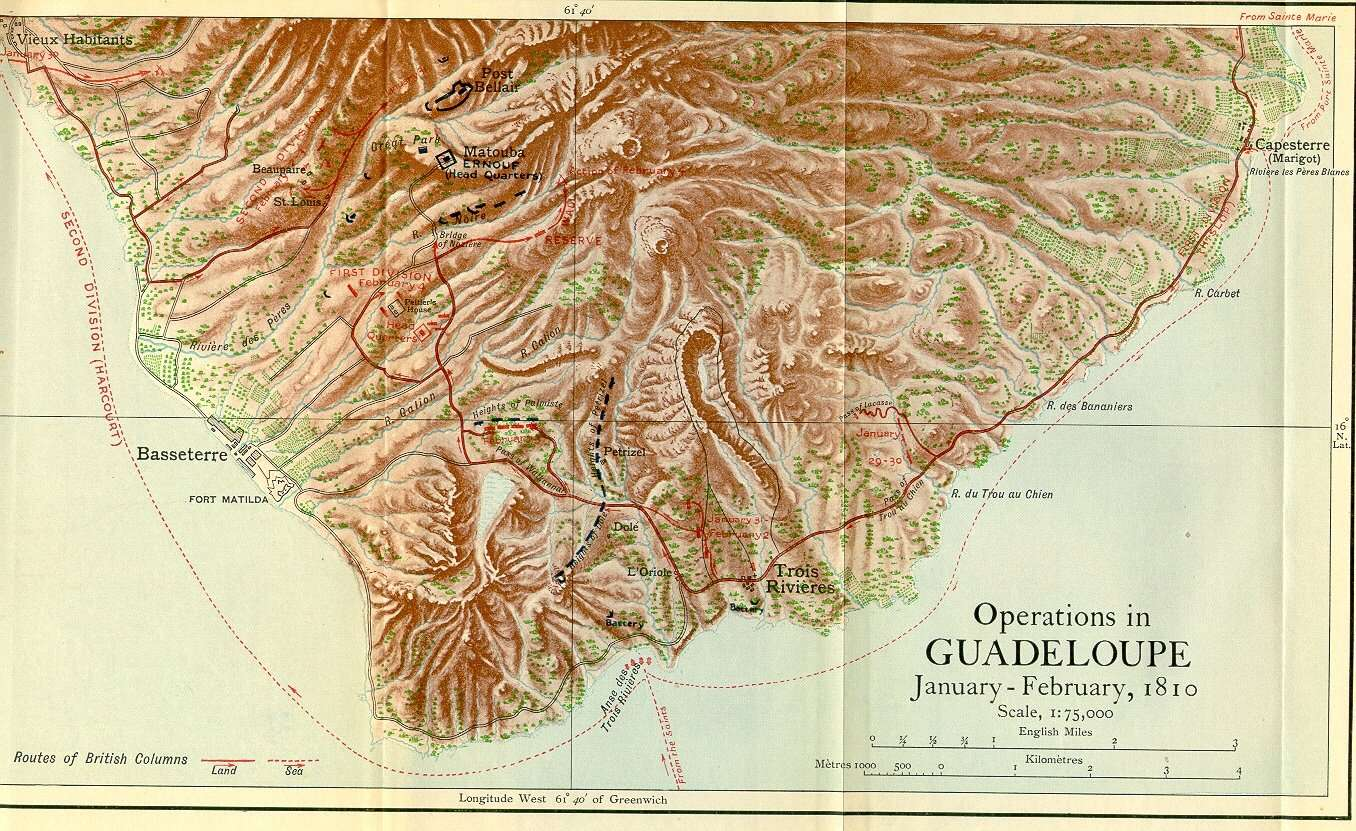
Map of the invasion

After a brief period of consolidation on Dominica, Cochrane and Beckwith sailed for Guadeloupe on 27 January 1810, arriving off Le Gosier in the evening and landing the larger division at the village of Sainte-Marie under the command of Hislop. The division split, with one half marching south towards Basse-Terre and the other north. Neither met serious opposition, the militia forces deserting in large numbers and abandoning their fortifications as the British approached. Messages were sent by the approaching British ordering the surrender of towns and forts, and both forces made rapid progress over the following two days. On 30 January, Ernouf took up a position with his remaining garrison in the Beaupère–St. Louis Ridge highlands that guarded the approaches to Basse-Terre, Hislop forming his men in front of Ernouf's position. Later in the day, Harcourt's men came ashore to the north of Basse-Terre, outflanking the strongest French positions at Trois-Rivières and forcing their withdrawal to Basse-Terre itself.

With his capital coming under bombardment from gun batteries set up by Royal Navy sailors organised into naval brigades, Ernouf marched to meet the British on the plain at Matabar on 3 February. Forming up, Ernouf attacked the British and initially drove them back, before superior numbers forced him to retire after he was outflanked by Wale's force attacking from the north. General Wale was wounded in the attack, in which his men suffered 40 casualties. One eyewitness, an Irish sailor from HMS Alfred, claimed that Ernouf had laid a large land mine along his line of retreat and planned to detonate it as the British advanced but was prevented from doing so when Beckwith spotted the trap and refused to be drawn into it, although this story does not appear in other accounts. While Ernouf was retreating, Commodore Fahie seized the opportunity to attack the undefended town of Basse-Terre, landing with a force of Royal Marines and capturing the town, cutting off Ernouf's route of escape. Isolated and surrounded, the French general requested a truce at 08:00 on 4 February to bury the dead from the battle the day before. This was accepted, and on 5 February he formally surrendered.

== Aftermath ==
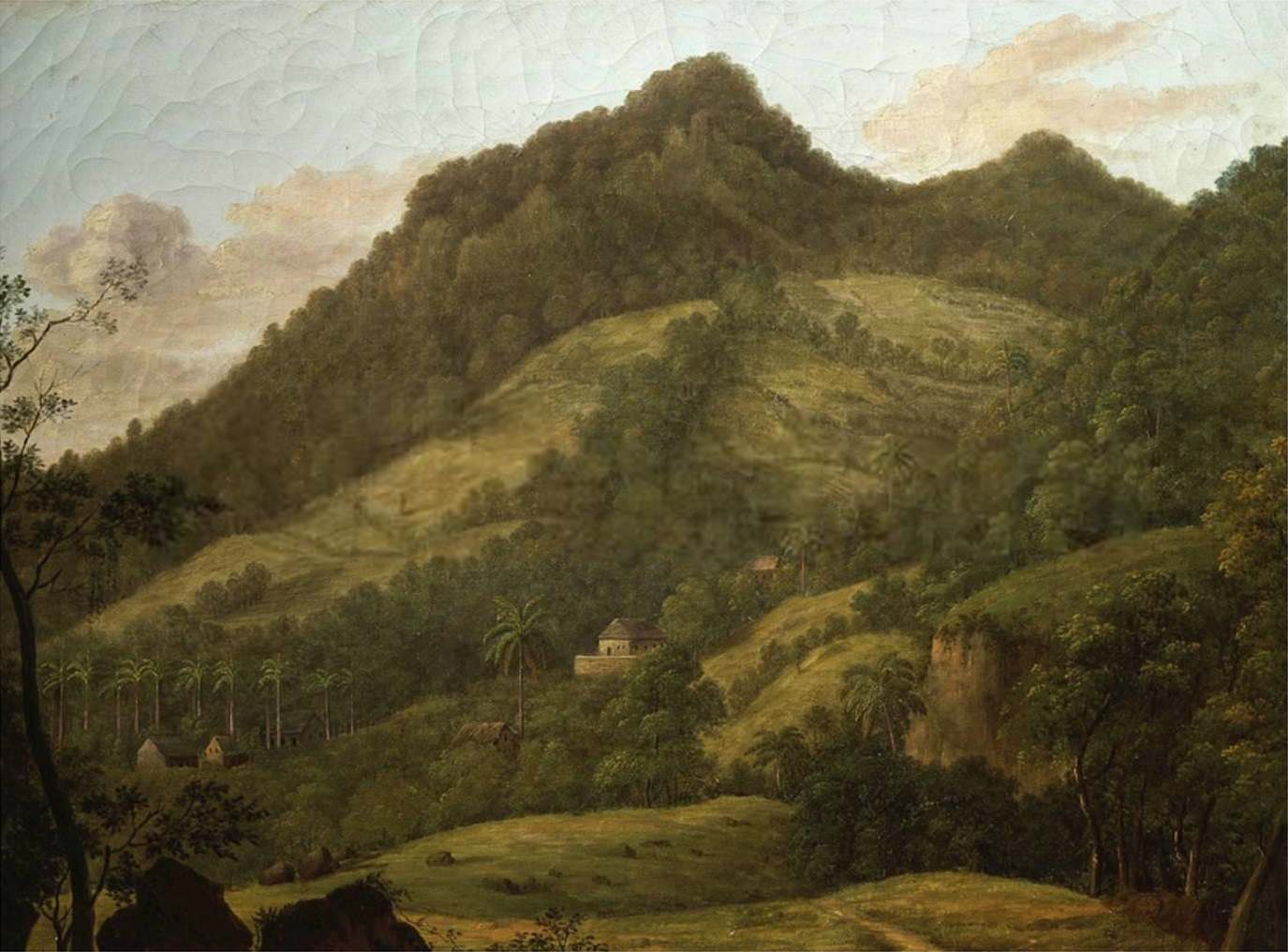
1813 painting of Guadeloupe when it was under British occupation

British casualties in the operation numbered 52 killed and 250 wounded, with seven men missing. French losses were heavier, in the region of 500–600 casualties throughout the campaign. 3,500 soldiers were captured with their officers, cannon and the French Imperial Eagle of the 66th Line Infantry Regiment. As Napoleon had rescinded the prisoner exchange system previously in place, all of the prisoners would remain in British hands until 1814. The captured eagle was sent to Britain, the first French eagle captured during the Napoleonic Wars. By 22 February, the nearby Dutch colonies of Sint Maarten, Sint Eustatius and Saba were all persuaded to surrender without a fight by ships sent from Cochrane's fleet. The British officers were rewarded for their successes: Beckwith remained in the Caribbean until he retired in 1814 from ill-health, while Cochrane and Hislop were promoted. All of the expedition's officers and men were voted the thanks of both Houses of Parliament and ten years later the regiments and ships that participated (or their descendants) were awarded the battle honour Guadaloupe 1810. Four decades after the operation, it was among the actions recognised by a clasp attached to the Naval General Service Medal and the Military General Service Medal, awarded upon application to all British participants still living in 1847.

Guadeloupe was taken over as a British colony for the remainder of the war, only restored to France after Napoleon's abdication in 1814. The following year, during the Hundred Days, Guadeloupe's governor Charles-Alexandre Durand Linois declared for the Emperor once more, requiring another British invasion, although of much smaller size and duration, to restore the monarchy. The fall of Guadeloupe marked the end of the final French territory in the Caribbean; the entire region was now in the hands of either the British or the Spanish, except the independent state of Haiti. The lack of French privateers and warships sparked a boom in trade operations, and the economies of the Caribbean islands experienced a resurgence. It also made a significant reduction in French international trade and had a corresponding effect on the French economy. Finally, the capture of the last French colony struck a decisive blow to the Atlantic slave trade, which had been made illegal by the British government in 1807 and was actively persecuted by the Royal Navy. Without French colonies in the Caribbean, there was no ready market for slaves in the region and the slave trade consequently dried up.
