= Samuel James Ballard =

Vice-Admiral Samuel James Ballard
- Born: c.28 March 1765; Portsmouth, Hampshire
- Died: 11 October 1829 (aged 64); Bath, Somerset
- Military career
- Allegiance: United Kingdom
- Branch: Royal Navy
- Service years: 1776–1829
- Rank: Vice-Admiral
- Commands: HMS Pearl; HMS Sceptre
- Conflicts: American Revolutionary War; Battle of Cape St. Vincent; Battle of Fort Royal; Battle of the Chesapeake; Battle of St. Kitts; French Revolutionary Wars; Glorious First of June; Siege of Porto Ferrajo; Napoleonic Wars; Invasion of Guadeloupe

Samuel James Ballard (bapt. 28 March 1765 – 11 October 1829) was a Vice-Admiral in the Royal Navy.

== Biography ==
Ballard was baptised on 28 March 1765 at St. Thomas, Portsmouth, the son of Samuel Ballard, a burgess and chandler of Portsmouth, and Lydia née Flint, daughter of James Flint of Epsom in Surrey.

=== Naval career ===
Ballard entered the navy in December 1776, under the patronage of Captain the Honourable John Leveson-Gower, son of John Leveson-Gower, 1st Earl Gower, who was at that time the captain of the Valiant, which formed part of the fleet under the command of Admiral Keppel during the summer of 1778. In October 1779 he was transferred to the Shrewsbury, Captain Mark Robinson, and was present in her when Sir George Rodney defeated the Spanish fleet off Cape St. Vincent on 16 January 1780. In the following July the Shrewsbury rejoined Rodney's fleet in the West Indies, was present off Martinique on 29 April 1781, and led the van in the action off the Chesapeake on 5 September 1781. During the battle the brunt of the fight fell on the Shrewsbury, which had fourteen killed and fifty-two wounded, including Captain Robinson, who lost a leg. The ship afterwards returned to the West Indies with Sir Samuel Hood, and was with him in the operations at St. Kitts in January 1782, after which she had to be sent to Jamaica for repairs. On 10 February 1783, whilst still at Jamaica, Ballard was made a 5th lieutenant by Admiral Rowley, and was actively employed in different ships during the ten years of peace. When war again broke out he was a first lieutenant of the Queen, which carried Rear-Admiral Alan Gardner's flag through the last days of May and 1 June 1794. The battle of the Glorious First of June won for Ballard his commander's rank on 5 July 1794, and on 1 August 1795 he was further advanced to the rank of post-captain.

Early in 1795 he was appointed to the frigate HMS Pearl, and during the next two years was continuously employed in convoying the trade for the Baltic or for Newfoundland and Quebec. In March 1798 he accompanied Commodore William Cornwallis to the coast of Africa and to Barbados, from which station he returned in June of the following year. In October he carried out General Fox to Menorca, and remained attached to the Mediterranean fleet for the next two years. The Pearl was paid off on 14 March 1802, after a commission of upwards of six years, during which time she had taken, destroyed, or recaptured about eighty vessels, privateers and merchantmen and served at the Siege of Porto Ferrajo. Ballard then spent seven years with the unattractive command of a district of Sea Fencibles until October 1809 when he was appointed to the Sceptre, of 74 guns, and sailed shortly afterwards for the West Indies. It was here that he flew a commodore's broad pennant, and on 18 December 1809 commanded the squadron which captured the two heavily armed French frigates Loire and Seine, and destroyed the protecting batteries at Anse-la-Barque of Guadeloupe. At the reduction of Guadeloupe in January and February 1810 he escorted one division of the army, and commanded the naval brigade, which, however, was not engaged. Commodore Ballard returned to England with the Sceptre in the following September, and was for the next two years attached to the fleet in the Channel and Bay of Biscay, but without being engaged in any active operations. His service at sea closed with the paying off of the Sceptre in January 1813, although in course of seniority he attained the rank of Rear-Admiral on 4 June 1814, and of Vice-Admiral on 27 May 1825.

=== Family ===
Ballard married twice, firstly to his cousin Maria Flint, daughter of James Flint and Sarah née Tritton, and secondly on 2 December 1822 at Flaxley in Gloucestershire to Catharina Crawley-Boevey, daughter of Sir Thomas Crawley-Boevey, 2nd Baronet and Ann née Savage. He had, by his first wife, three children. Maria Charlotte born in 1802 in Godalming who subsequently married Reverend Robert Serjeantson who became Vicar of Snaith, Yorkshire. Anna Elizabeth, born 1805 in Godalming, who married Captain Thomas Coventry Brander of the 15th Light Dragoons. Samuel Wrangham Ballard, born in 1810 in Margate, Kent, and married Catherine Salwey, daughter of Richard Salwey of the Moor Park and the Haye Park in Shropshire on 6 September 1832 and died without male issue in 1852.

Ballard inherited Coates Hall, Snaith, in Yorkshire in 1820 from his aunt Charlotte Flint, widow of Lt.Col. William Flint of the East India Company, but he appears not to have lived there preferring instead to remain in his house at 29 Park Street, Bath, where he died on 11 October 1829.
