= En flûte =

Reducing a ship's armament to carry more cargo

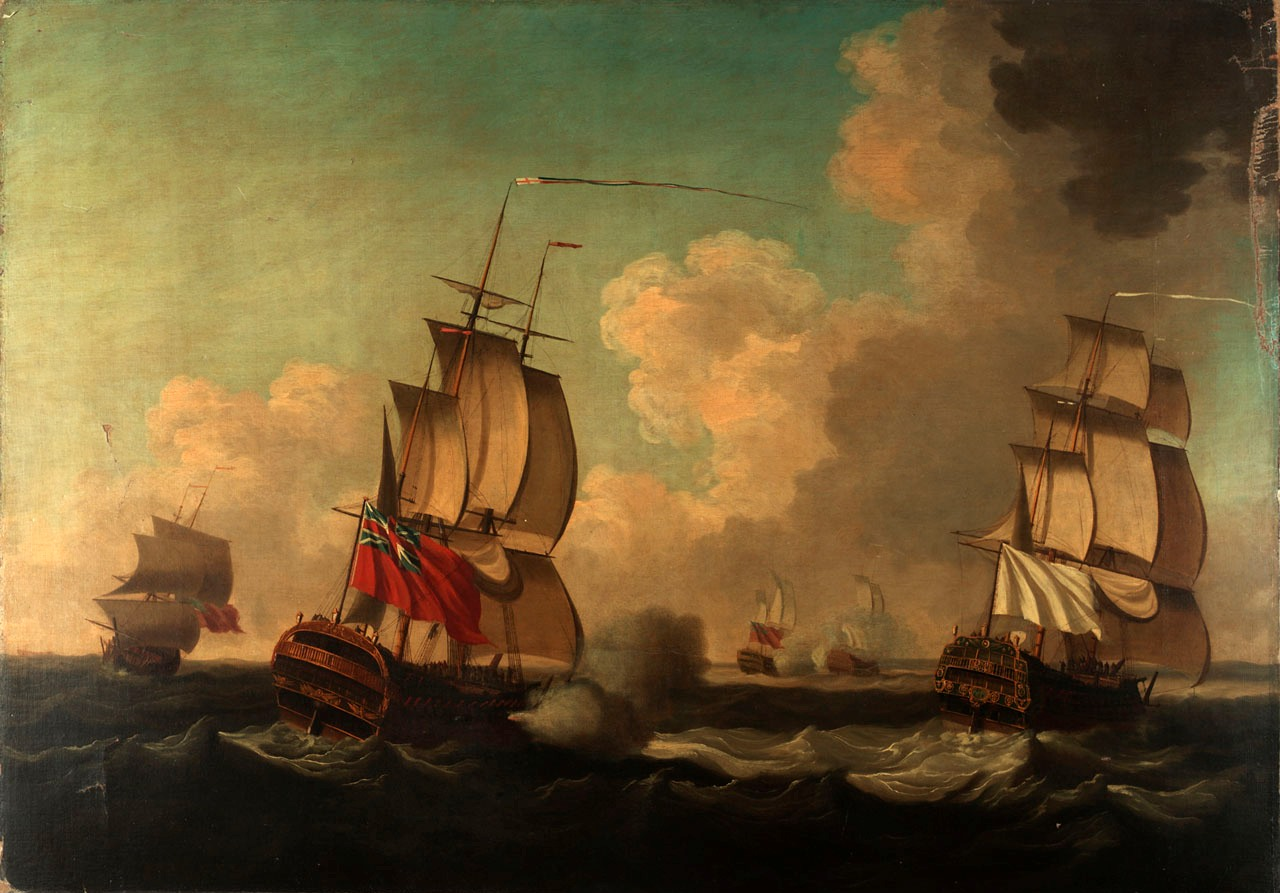
The Capture of the Alcide and Lys, a painting depicting the action of 8 June 1755; the 64-gun Lys was armed en flûte, her armament reduced to 22 guns.

En flûte (French for "as a fluyt") is a French naval expression of the Age of Sail to designate the use of a warship as a transport with reduced armament.

Some warships, ships of the line or frigates, were occasionally used with limited artillery, by reducing the number and calibre of their guns. Since ships have a limited amount of cargo space, they may be armed en flûte to make room for other cargo, such as troops and ammunition, reducing the ship's ability to defend herself if attacked.

The term emerged from the French name for a type of ship – the cargo-carrying flûte used extensively as a mercantile ship or as a naval auxiliary vessel. In turn this derived from the Dutch name fluyt, probably the most common type of cargo-carrier during the seventeenth century – when in English usage it was commonly rendered as a flyboat.

This tactic was most relevant in the Age of Sail, when gun decks took up most of the space on a warship above the waterline. Reducing the artillery of a ship of the line or a frigate entailed a dramatic saving in space, since the removal of certain guns meant that their gunners (and their equipment and provisions) were not needed. The size of the crew of a sailing warship was determined primarily by the number of guns on the ship, sometimes over 100, as each gun needed a crew of several men, and it might be necessary to have all the guns in action simultaneously. The number of men required to fight on board the ship was far higher than the number needed simply to sail it. A typical ship of the line armed en flûte would have her armament cut down to a quarter of her maximum, and could accommodate over 1,000 troops.

For instance, leading up to the Seven Years' War, the French sent 3,000 troops to reinforce French Canada aboard a large squadron of ships-of-war. To make room for these troops, most of the ships were armed en flûte.

As an opposite, a ship fitted with her entire complement of sailors, guns and ammunition was said to be armed en guerre ("readied for war").

== See also ==
- en aventurier

== Notes and references ==
=== Sources ===
- Willaumez, Jean-Baptiste-Philibert (1825). Dictionnaire de marine (in French). Bachelier. p. 294.
