= Dardanelles operation (1807) =

1807 battle of the Anglo-Turkish War

- Part of the Anglo-Turkish War of 1807–1809
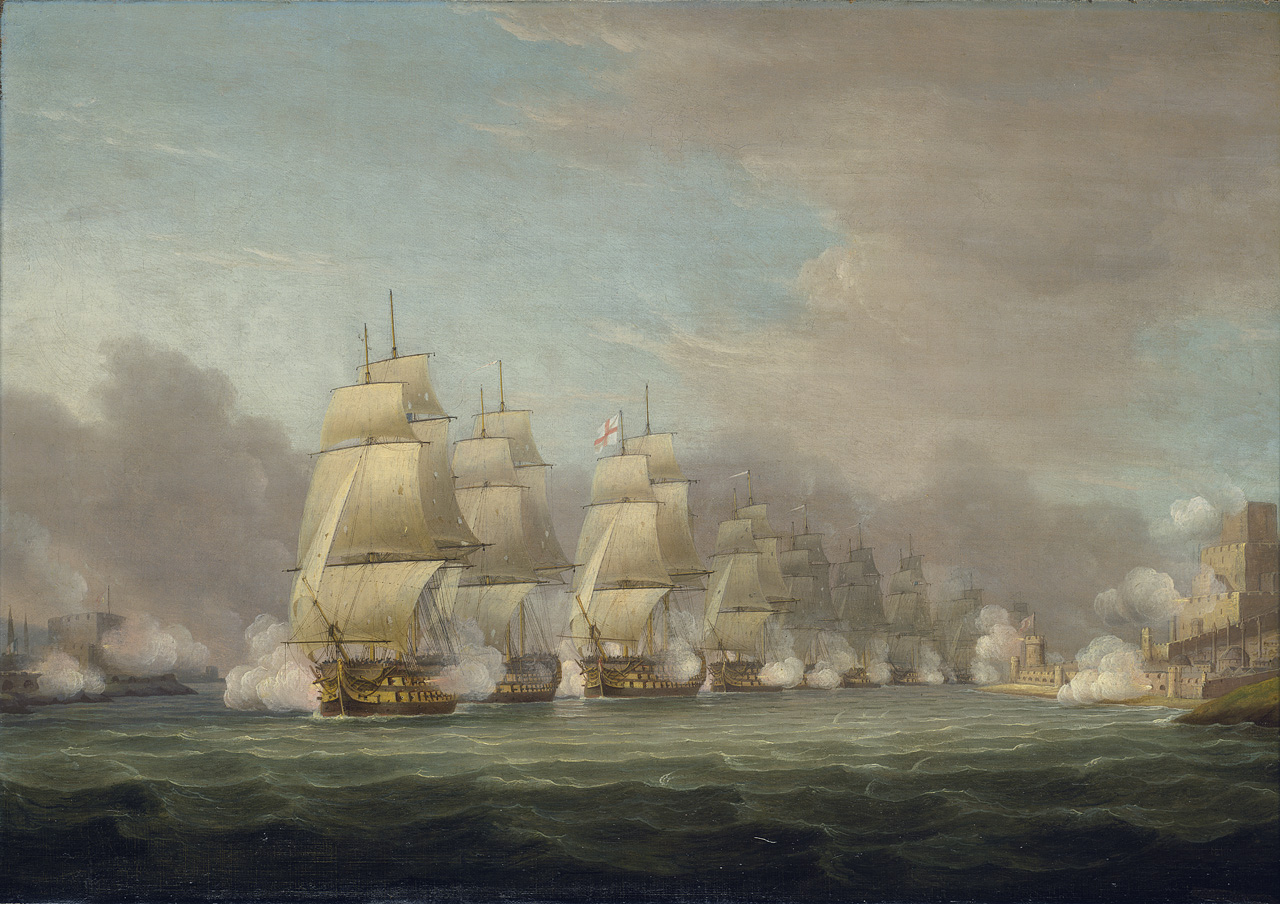
- Duckworth's squadron forces the Dardanelles, 19 February 1807, by Thomas Whitcombe
Date	19 February – 3 March 1807
Location	Dardanelles
Result	Ottoman victory

Belligerents
United Kingdom	Ottoman Empire

Commanders and leaders
(United Kingdom of Great Britain and Ireland) John Duckworth (United Kingdom of Great Britain and Ireland) Sidney Smith	Selim III

Strength
8 ships of the line 2 frigates 2 bomb vessels	1 ship of the line 4 frigates 4 corvettes 2 brigs 2 gunboats forts and shore batteries

Casualties and losses
42 killed 235 wounded 4 missing 6 ships of the line and 1 frigate damaged	4 frigates and 1 redoubt destroyed 11 men, 1 corvette, 1 gunboat, 1 boat, and 2 guns captured

The Dardanelles operation was a failed assault in 1807 by the Royal Navy against the coastal fortifications of Constantinople. The operation was part of the Anglo-Turkish War. In 1806, the French envoy Sebastiani had been dispatched to Constantinople with orders to bring about Ottoman Turkey's re-entry into the Napoleonic Wars. Sultan Selim III set about preparations for war with Russia after positively receiving Sebastiani. The Russian emperor, Alexander I, was alarmed by these developments as he had already deployed a significant force to Poland and East Prussia to fight the advancing French forces under Emperor Napoleon I. Alexander requested British assistance in keeping the Ottomans out of the war.

The British Army was far too small and inadequate for the request, so it fell to the Royal Navy to meet the demands of Alexander. The ships immediately available for the task were HMS Canopus, HMS Standard, HMS Thunderer, HMS Glatton, and the two bomb ships HMS Lucifer and HMS Meteor, under the command of Vice-Admiral Cuthbert Collingwood, commander-in-chief of the British Mediterranean Fleet, sailed for the Dardanelles and made preparations for the upcoming assault.

In the meantime, the British ambassador to Constantinople, Arbuthnot, demanded that the Ottoman government evict Sebastiani, and added that should the Ottomans reject the ultimatum, the Mediterranean fleet would attack. The actual force that had been chosen by Collingwood to carry out the operation was small, only eight ships-of-the-line and four frigates. In addition, four Russian ships-of-the-line under Admiral Dmitry Senyavin were sent to support the British, but did not join them until after the exit from Dardanelles was made. John Duckworth, who commanded the British, was under orders to bombard Constantinople and capture the Ottoman fleet.

== Background ==
In anticipation of a war between Russia and the Turkish Empire, Britain had sent Sir Thomas Louis from Cadiz on 2 November 1806 into the Mediterranean Sea. He reached Tenedos, near the Dardanelles Strait, on 21 November, made a brief trip to Constantinople and returned to the Straits. The Ottomans had declared war on Russia on 30 December 1806, and Britain sent Duckworth in Royal George 100 guns from Cadiz on 15 January 1807 into the Mediterranean Sea. Picking up Windsor Castle 98 guns and Repulse 74 guns from Gibraltar and Pompée 74 and Ajax 74 from Malta as replacements for the Russian fleet under Seniavin, which was still in the Adriatic, Duckworth proceeded to Tenedos. Despite the British ultimatum, on December 22 Selim declared war on Russia. On 29 January 1807, the frigate Endymion of 40 guns left Constantinople, evacuating the British ambassador and all British residents. A formal declaration of war had not yet been sent by London and the two powers were still technically allied.

On February 10, Duckworth's fleet concentrated at the mouth of the Dardanelles. It met Louis's ships and returned to Tenedos on 1 February, where Duckworth's ships met up. Still not technically at war, the Ottomans delayed Duckworth with token negotiations. The presence of British and Russian vessels at the mouth of the Dardanelles caused Sebastiani and his French engineering officers to begin the improvement of the Ottoman shore batteries.

== The battle ==
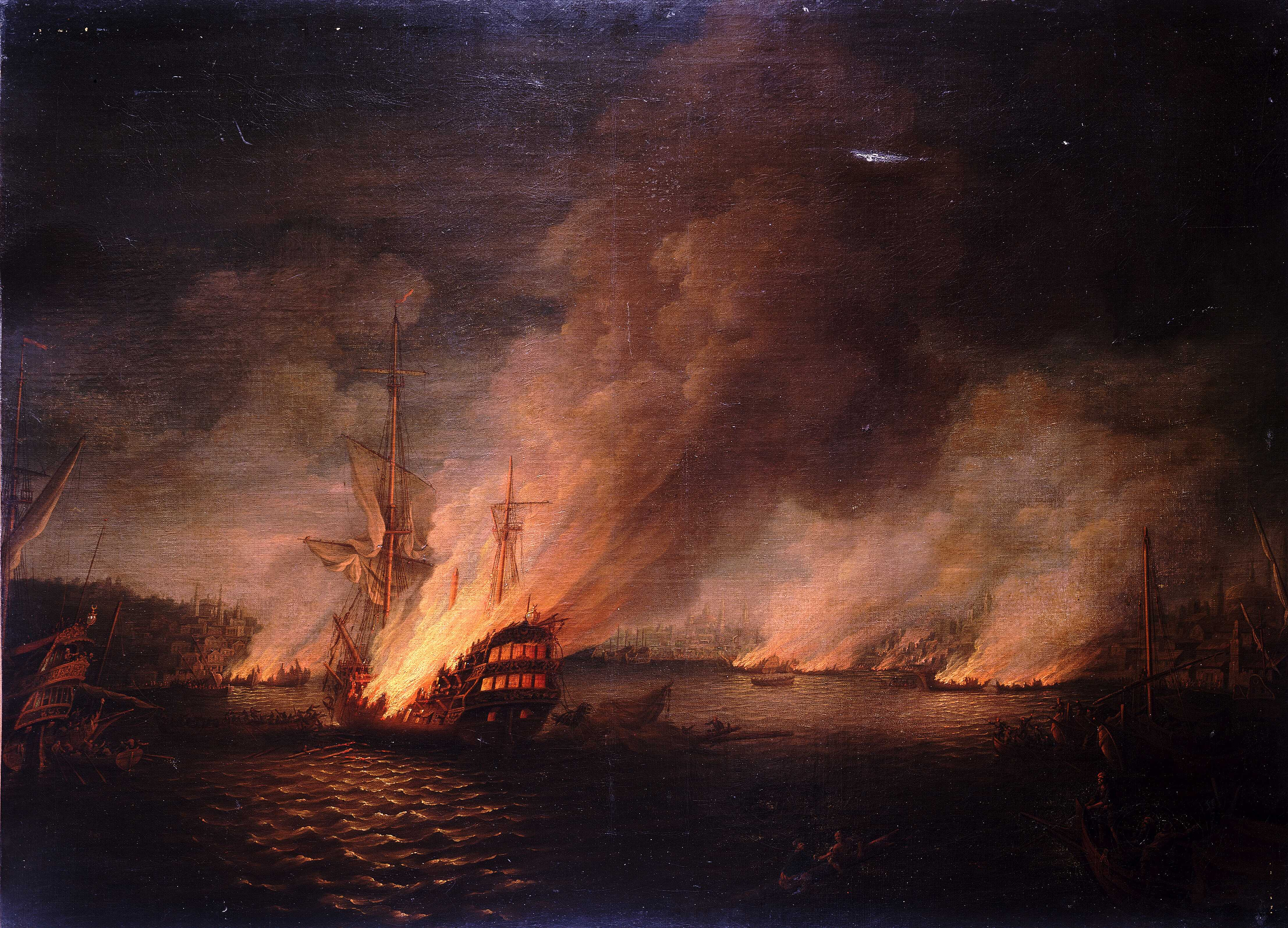
Sir John Thomas Duckworth's action in the Dardanelles, 19 February 1807

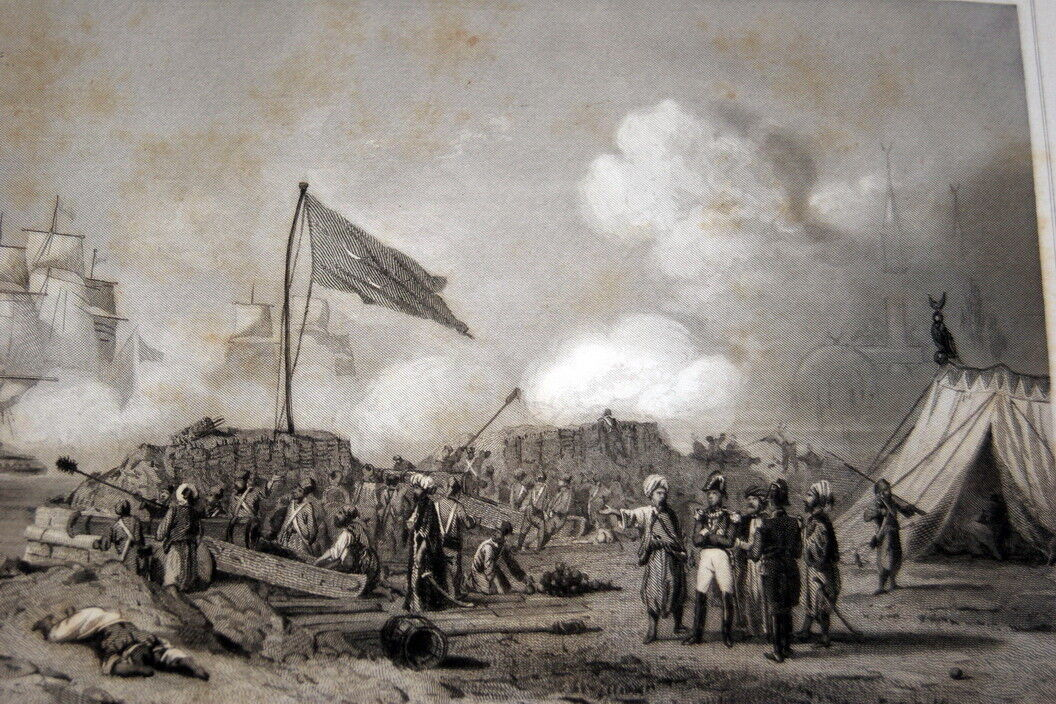
French general Sébastiani during the defense of Constantinople.

On 11 February, the fleet, with Duckworth in command, left Tenedos, but for a week could not enter the Straits because of lack of wind. Ajax caught fire on 14 February, ran aground on Tenedos, and blew up on 15 February.

Finally, on 19 February the ships sailed up the Dardanelles, where they were fired on by the forts at the entrance (fire was returned by the bombs), then the castles further up (fire was returned by the fleet). However, the absence of significant numbers of Ottoman troops owing to the end of Ramadan meant the batteries were ineffective and the fleet quickly reached the Sea of Marmara.

Just above the castles lay a 64-gun ship, frigates of 40, 36, 36, and 32 guns, sloops of 22, 18, 10 and 10 guns, 2 brigs and 2 gunboats. As the British fleet approached, one of the brigs left and sailed further up for Constantinople. After Royal George passed, anchoring some 3 miles further up, Pompée, Thunderer, Standard, Endymion and Active attacked the Ottoman ships and a new fortification being built nearby. An Ottoman corvette and gunboat were captured and the other ships forced ashore and destroyed by British boats. Duckworth then ordered marines under Edward Nicolls to land and seize the shore batteries, and as the Ottoman gunners tried to flee from an island they called Brota, (Note: Known as Proti to the Greeks, and now known as Kınalı or Kınalıada 40°54′47″N 29°03′00″E) the Royal Marines captured two guns.

At 5pm the fleet sailed for Constantinople, leaving Active behind to finish up. British casualties in this action were 10 killed and 77 wounded. After suffering extensive damage, Duckworth withdrew without ever attempting a bombardment of Constantinople.

One of the batteries deployed by the Ottomans against the British fleet was armed with a medieval 18.6 ton cast bronze piece with 63 cm diameter stones used for projectiles, known as the Dardanelles Gun. The piece had been cast in 1464 on the model of bombards used in the 1453 Siege of Constantinople and now resides in Fort Nelson.

== Aftermath ==
Duckworth sailed off Constantinople for a week and a half, hoping the Ottoman fleet would come out and fight, but it did not. Releasing the sloop on 2 March, he returned through the Dardanelles to Tenedos on 3 March. On the way, the fortifications again fired on the British, who lost 29 killed and 138 wounded. At Tenedos he was met by Seniavin, who had left Corfu on 22 February.

He did not make a second attempt on the Dardanelles—a decision that earned him criticism, but was probably reasonable considering the powerful shore batteries. An attempt to capture the Ottoman fleet would have probably failed and resulted in much higher British casualties.

The entire operation was a failure, resulting in heavy losses of 42 killed, 235 wounded and 4 missing. Long after France and Russia had made peace and Senyavin had defeated the Ottoman fleet at the Dardanelles on 10–11 May 1807, the Ottomans would remain at war with Russia, draining a significant portion of the Russian army, which also became involved in operations against Sweden in the Finnish War, and later in the resumption of hostilities against France in 1812.

== Fleet ==
The Royal Navy fleet included:

Vanguard Division commanded by Rear-Admiral Sir Thomas Louis

- HMS Canopus 80-gun third-rate (Flag-Captain Thomas George Shortland)
- HMS Endymion 40-gun fifth-rate frigate (Captain Hon. Thomas Bladen Capel)
- HMS Ajax 74-gun third-rate (Captain Hon. Henry Blackwood)

Main Division commanded by Vice-Admiral Sir John Thomas Duckworth

- HMS Royal George 100-gun first-rate (Flag-Captain Richard Dalling Dunn)
- HMS Windsor Castle 98-gun second-rate (Captain Charles Boyles)
- HMS Repulse 74-gun third-rate (Captain Hon. Arthur Kaye Legge)
- HMS Active 38-gun fifth-rate (Captain Richard Hussy Moubray)

Rear Division commanded by Rear-Admiral Sir Sidney Smith

- HMS Standard 64-gun third-rate (Captain Thomas Harvey)
- HMS Thunderer 74-gun third-rate (Captain John Talbot)
- HMS Pompee 74-gun third-rate (Flag Captain Richard Dacres)
- HMS Lucifer bomb vessel (Captain Elliot)
- HMS Meteor bomb vessel (Commander James Collins) (Note: Meteor's main 13-inch mortar split in two on first firing.)
- HMS Madras (store ship) 54-gun (Captain Charles Marsh Schomberg)
- HMS Delight 16-gun brig-sloop (sloop of war) (Note: Joined at Cape Matapan on the 6 February, but not given by Smith because it had acted as a message ship, and had rejoined the squadron on 3 March from Messina via Malta.)
- HMS Juno 32-gun fifth-rate (Captain Henry Richardson) (Note: Not reported by Smith, but in Brenton.)
