= Sir John Louis, 2nd Baronet =

Royal Navy Admiral (1785–1863)

Admiral Sir John Louis Bt
- Born: 1785
- Died: 31 March 1863 (aged 78); Eaton Place, London, England
- Military career
- Allegiance: United Kingdom
- Branch: Royal Navy
- Rank: Admiral
- Commands: Malta Dockyard; Devonport

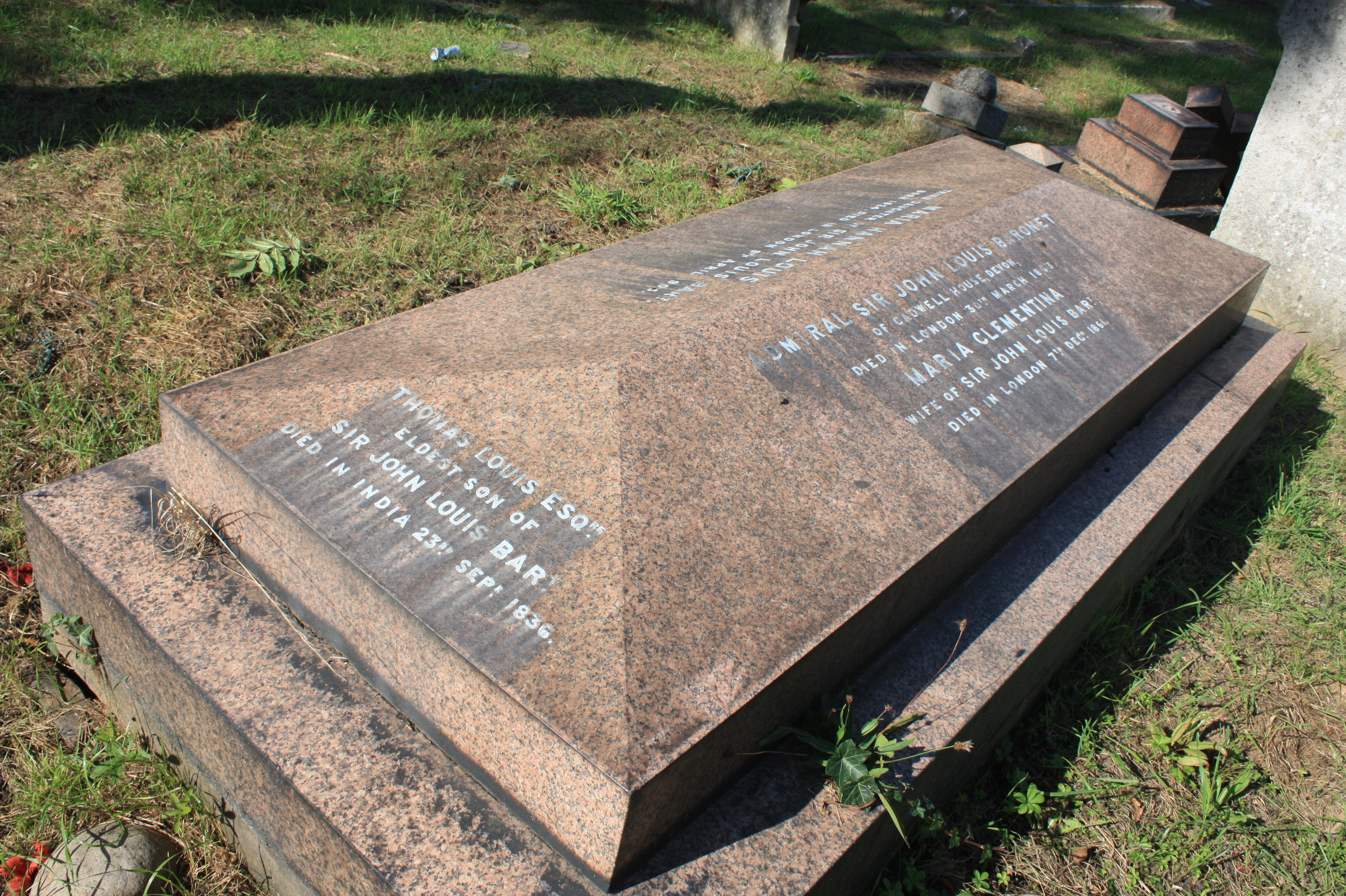
Sir John Louis' grave, Kensal Green Cemetery

Admiral Sir John Louis, 2nd Baronet (1785 – 31 March 1863) was an officer in the Royal Navy.

== Naval career ==
John Louis entered the Navy in 1795, aboard the Minotaur 74, commanded by his father, Rear-Admiral Sir Thomas Louis, 1st Baronet. From February 1797 until August 1800, Sir John Louis served as a midshipman on the Indefatigable and the Impétueux, each under the orders of Captain Sir Edward Pellew. In February 1801, he again joined the Minotaur 74 and by April 21, was made Lieutenant by his father. On December 14, 1804, 12 months after he had joined the Royal George 100, flag-ship in the Mediterranean of Sir Kich. Bickerton, Mr. Louis was there promoted to the acting-command of the Childers sloop. He served during 1810 off the coast of Ireland and off Cadiz, was in the Mediterranean in 1811 and then went out to the West Indies. After several years on half-pay, he served again in the West Indies, 1826 to 1830. In 1837 he was appointed Captain Superintendent of Woolwich Dockyard and also to the command of the William and Mary yacht. Promoted to rear admiral in 1838, he was Admiral Superintendent of Malta Dockyard, 1838 to 1843, and Admiral Superintendent of Devonport, 1846 to 1850. Louis was promoted to vice-admiral in 1849 and to admiral in 1851.

He succeeded his father as 2nd Baronet on 17 May 1807.

He is buried with his wife, Maria Clementina (né Kirkpatrick), and son, Thomas Louis, in Kensal Green Cemetery in London.

Military offices
Preceded by Thomas Briggs	Admiral Superintendent, Malta Dockyard; 1838–1843	Succeeded by Lucius Curtis
Baronetage of the United Kingdom
Preceded by Thomas Louis	Baronet (of Chelston); 1807–1863	Succeeded by John Louis
