= HMS Delight (1806) =

Brig-sloop of the Royal Navy

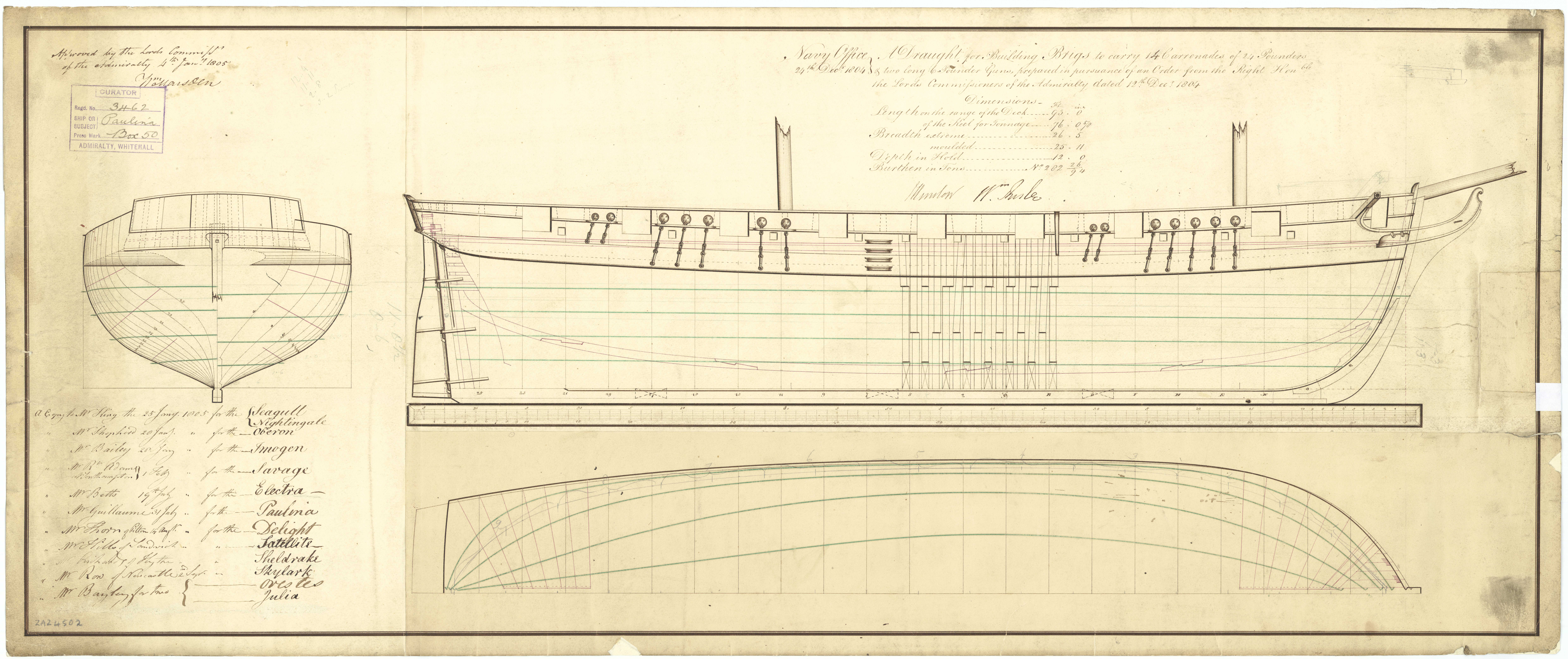
- Delight

History

United Kingdom
- Name: HMS Delight
- Ordered: 12 July 1805
- Builder: Richard Thorne, Fremington
- Laid down: June 1805
- Launched: June 1806
- Commissioned: July 1806
- Fate: Grounded off Reggio Calabria in January 1808

General characteristics
- Type: 16-gun brig-sloop
- Tons burthen: 28444/94 (bm)
- Length: 93 ft 0 1/2 in (28.4 m) (overall); 76 ft 1 7/8 in (23.2 m) (keel)
- Beam: 26 ft 6 in (8.1 m)
- Depth of hold: 12 ft 0 1/4 in (3.7 m)
- Sail plan: Sloop
- Complement: 95
- Armament: 14 × 24-pounder carronades; 2 × 6-pounder bow guns

HMS Delight was a British Royal Navy 16-gun brig-sloop of the Seagull class launched in June 1806, six months late. She grounded off Reggio Calabria in January 1808 and was burnt to prevent her being salvaged.

== Career ==
Commander Phillip Handfield commissioned Delight in July 1806. He then sailed her for the Mediterranean in November.

In February 1807, Delight was part of the Rear Division, commanded by Rear-Admiral Sir Sidney Smith, at Admiral Duckworth's Dardanelles Operation, which was the Royal Navy's unsuccessful attempt to impose British demands on the Ottoman Empire as part of the Anglo-Turkish War (1807-1809).

On 6 April 1807 Delight brought to Vice Admiral Lord Collingwood at Cadiz the news of the capitulation of Alexandria to British forces on 28 March.

== Fate ==
Delight was with a British squadron at Palermo in January 1808 when news arrived that the French had captured four Sicilian gunboats and taken them to Reggio di Calabria. Delight and HMS Glatton sailed to attempt to recapture the boats, and more importantly their guns, to prevent the French from using them against the British forces at Scylla (Scilla, Calabria). While attempting to prepare for action at the port, Delight grounded. Captain Thomas Secombe came over from Glatton to assist in the attempt to free Delight. Delight came under heavy fire from the shore, which she returned, but during the exchange French fire killed Handfield and seriously wounded Secombe. Eventually the decision was made to abandon Delight and the crew took to the boats. However, the French arrived before everyone could escape, and they captured a number of men, including Secombe. The French permitted Secombe to come to Messina on parole, but he died on 3 February from his wounds.
