= Thomas Bladen Capel =

Royal Navy officer (1776–1853)

Admiral Sir Thomas Capel GCB
- Born: 25 August 1776; London, England
- Died: 4 March 1853 (aged 76); London, England
- Military career
- Allegiance: Great Britain; United Kingdom
- Branch: Royal Navy
- Rank: Admiral
- Commands: HMS Mutine; HMS Alecto; HMS Arab; HMS Meleager; HMS Phoebe; HMS La Hogue; Far East squadron Portsmouth Command
- Conflicts: French Revolutionary War; Napoleonic Wars; War of 1812
- Awards: Knight Grand Cross of the Order of the Bath

Admiral Sir Thomas Bladen Capel GCB (25 August 1776 – 4 March 1853) was a Royal Navy officer whose distinguished service in the French Revolutionary War, the Napoleonic Wars and the War of 1812 earned him rapid promotion and great acclaim both in and out of the Navy. He was also a great friend of Admiral Nelson and can be considered a full member of Nelson's band of brothers.

== Naval career ==
=== Early years ===
Born in August 1776 and raised in London, Thomas Capel was the fourth son of William Anne Capel, 4th Earl of Essex and first child of his second wife, Harriet. His mother also had influence as the daughter of Colonel Thomas Bladen, and Capel received preferential treatment due to his status from a very young age. Entered onto the books of HMS Phaeton on 22 March 1782 as servant to Captain Waldegrave. He was just five years and 7 months old and this customary practice enabled him to rise rapidly through the ranks when he finally did go to sea.

Capel first served on HMS Assistance on the Newfoundland station in April 1792, then on 1 March 1793, as a midshipman aboard HMS Syren, where he was highly praised for his seamanship and discipline. Following his captain, John Manley, he transferred to the 38-gun frigate HMS Apollo before serving under Lord Hugh Seymour in the 3rd rate vessels HMS Leviathan (74 guns) and HMS Sans Pareil (80 guns), where he saw action at the battle of Groix in 1795. After the battle, San Pareil and her crew returned to the channel and blockade duty. Capel was promoted to acting lieutenant in the May 1796 and on 5 April 1797 he joined the newly built frigate HMS Cambrian as a lieutenant under Captain, the Honourable Arthur Kaye Legge.

=== Battle of the Nile ===
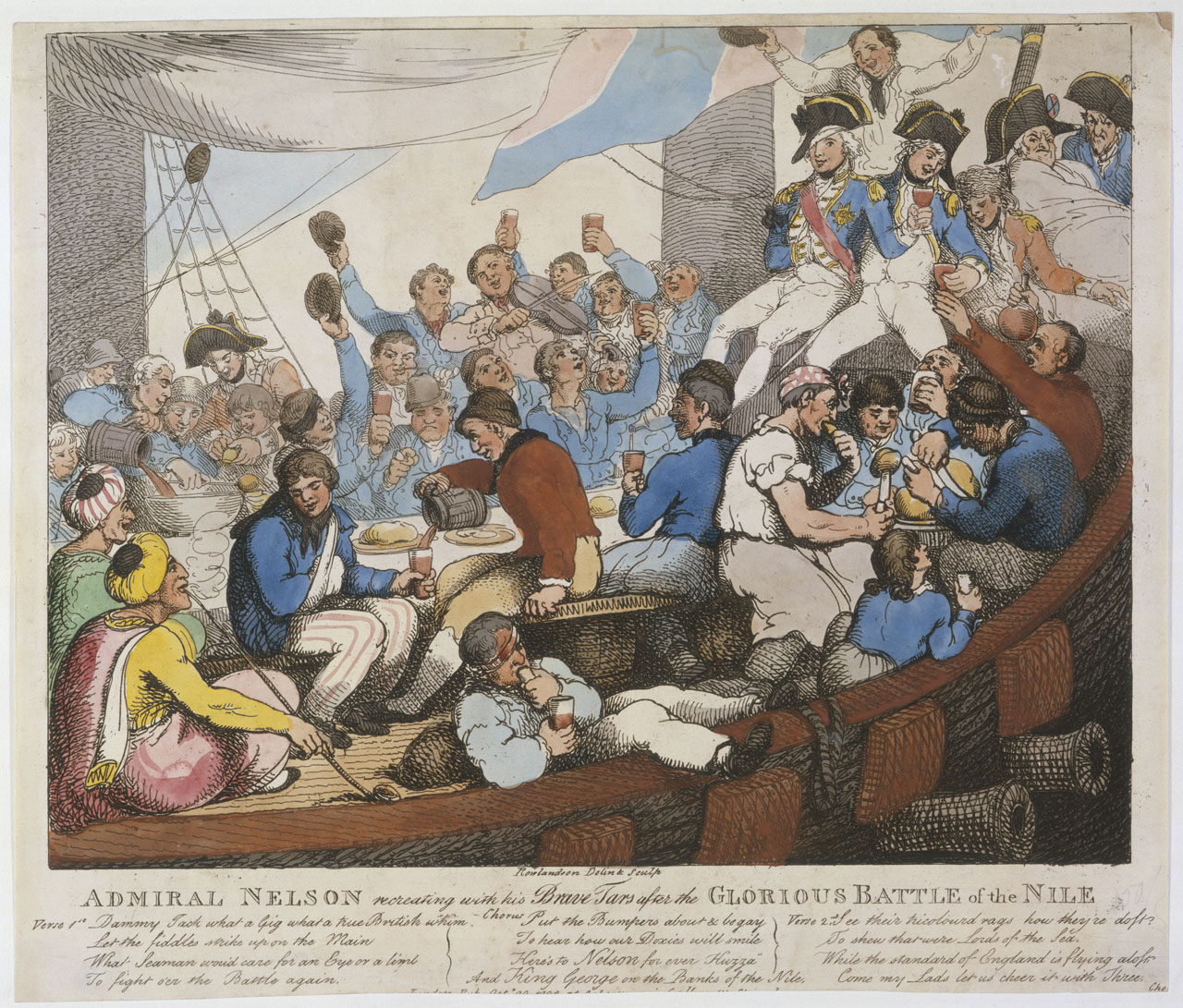
A cartoon showing Nelson and his officers celebrating with the men aboard HMS Vanguard after the victory at the Battle of the Nile

In April 1798 he joined the flagship of Rear-Admiral Sir Horatio Nelson, the newly refitted 74 gun HMS Vanguard, under Captain Edward Berry. On 8 May the Vanguard, as part of a small squadron, left Gibraltar to re-establish a presence in the Mediterranean and to search for the French fleet. On 20 May, they were struck by a sudden gale in which the Vanguard lost her entire foremast assembly and both her main and mizzen topmasts. Despite the arrival of reinforcements, including ten ships of the line, on 6 June; Nelson remained aboard the jury masted, Vanguard. Therefore, Capel was serving as Nelson's signal lieutenant on 1 August 1798 when Nelson's fleet destroyed the French at the battle of the Nile. He impressed the admiral to such a degree, he was mentioned in dispatches as "a most excellent officer" and presented with the sword of the senior, surviving French admiral.

=== First commands ===
Capel was made acting commander of the 16-gun brig HMS Mutine, and was given the honour of carrying the second set of dispatches to London despite the claims of a large number of superior officers. The first dispatches, carried by Berry in HMS Leander were captured shortly after leaving, which meant that when Capel arrived in London after passage in the brig and overland travel, he was the first to bring news of the victory. His promotion to commander was confirmed when he was given command of the elderly fireship HMS Alecto on the home station, and was subsequently made post captain on 27 December 1798.

Following this promotion, he was then transferred on 5 January from Alecto into the 22-gun post-ship HMS Arab, a sixth-rate frigate which sailed under his command for Jamaica on 23 April 1799. On 19 July 1800 he transferred to command of a 32-gun fifth-rate frigate HMS Meleager which was wrecked on the Triangle Rocks in the Gulf of Mexico on 9 June 1801.

=== Renewed hostilities ===
In the May 1802 shortly after the Peace of Amiens, Capel was appointed to the 38 gun, fifth rate frigate HMS Révolutionnaire which took him from Spithead to the Mediterranean where he joined HMS Phoebe as her captain. When war with France was renewed in April 1803 Capel, still in HMS Phoebe was re-attached to Nelson and began the task of observing French naval movements. In April 1805 Phoebe spotted Vice-Admiral Villeneuve's squadron leaving Toulon and while Nelson pursued them to the West Indies and back, Capel was ordered to use a squadron of 5 frigates and 2 bomb vessels to block French passage to Sicily, Sardinia and Egypt.

The Franco-Spanish fleet entered Cádiz on 20 August Phoebe joined the blockading fleet. In October 1805, Capel's squadron was based at Gibraltar acting as the eyes of the British fleet and when the Combined Fleet put to sea, Phoebe was one of the chain of ships who relayed signals to Nelson's fleet, 48 miles away.

=== Trafalgar ===
On 21 October, Capel was summoned to HMS Victory to receive his final orders for the upcoming battle. Phoebe and the three other frigates were to stay to windward and repeat signals to the ships in the rear; any escaping enemy ships were to be pursued and forced to strike their colours; and any dismasted British, or captured enemy ships were to be taken in tow. Capel was present throughout the ensuing battle of Trafalgar, relaying Nelson's signals to the rest of fleet, and remaining close to the action although not actually engaged with the enemy. In the storm which followed the battle, Phoebe was essential in saving the captured Swiftsure and the Spanish ship Bahama, bringing them all safely to Gibraltar. On 4 November, Admiral Collingwood wrote "The extraordinary exertion of Captain Capel saved the French Swiftsure; and his ship the Phoebe, together with the Dougal afterwards brought out the Bahama". When the disabled Fougueux drifted away, Capel made repeated efforts to retrieve her but she broke up when she was blown ashore the next day.

=== Turkish Straits ===
After Trafalgar, Capel returned to England, where he sat on the court martial of Vice-Admiral Sir Robert Calder, before being appointed to the 4th rate 40 gun Endymion. Capel's ship carried the British ambassador, Sir Charles Arbuthnot, to Constantinople and then in 1807, on hearing of a plot to kidnap Sir Charles and some leading British Merchants, Capel foiled the attempt by inviting them to dine aboard the Endymion before setting sail. On 16 September 1807 Endymion captured the Santa Rosalinda. Capel's share of the prize money was 838 pounds, 17 shillings and 2½ pence. Capel returned to Constantinople later that year when he took part in further the forcing of the Dardanelles under Sir John Duckworth. On the way back to the Aegean, Endymion was hit by two 800 lb stone shot which killed three and injured ten of her crew. Capel was once again mentioned in dispatches for his part in the battle and received the ship of the line La Hogue as a command, which he took to the North American station at the outbreak of the War of 1812.

=== 1812 ===
Capel remained on the North American station for the duration of the war where he commanded a small squadron along the Eastern seaboard. During this conflict, Capel maintained a careful watch on the passage of American shipping, especially their frigate base at New London, which he effectively nullified. Along with other American vessels, in April 1813 Capel captured the American merchantman Caroline. The prize money distributed to Capel amounted to 82 pounds and 10¾ pence. On 27 June 1813, off Nova Scotia, Capel trapped the Young Teazer in a harbour, which was blown up rather than captured. In another capture, that of the American merchantman Montezuma on 14 October 1814 Capel received 777 pounds, 11 shillings and 3¾ pence. He returned home in 1814 and was awarded the CB in June 1815.

=== Latter years ===
Capel commanded the royal yachts Royal George and Apollo between 15 December 1821 and 27 May 1827, earning greater promotion and favours from his new patrons. Despite the slower promotion rate in peacetime, he became Rear-Admiral of the Blue squadron on 27 May 1825 and rear-admiral of the red squadron on 22 July 1830 and was knighted soon afterwards and awarded the KCB in February 1832. In May 1834, Sir Thomas Capel served as commander in chief of the Far East squadron until July 1837 aboard the fourth-rate frigate HMS Winchester. He was promoted to vice-admiral on 10 January 1837.

In 1847, a full admiral, an aged Capel sat on the board that decided to issue the Naval General Service Medal for Naval service between 1793 and 1840, and which contained a Trafalgar clasp that Capel himself wore. He became Commander-in-Chief, Portsmouth, in 1848 and made a Knight Grand Cross of the Order of the Bath in April 1852.

Thomas Bladen Capel died at his home in Rutland Gate, London, on 4 March 1853. He was buried in Kensal Green cemetery in a family plot, later joined by his wife Dame Harriet Capel. Their gravestone can still be seen and is largely still legible.

== Family ==
In 1816 he married Harriet Catherine Smyth; they had no children, but Capel became a slaveowner as a result of this marriage. In her diary, Lady Adela Caroline Harriett Capel, Admiral Bladen Capel's great niece, and refers to times spent with Bladen Capel and his wife at Little Cassiobury. She lived at Cassiobury House and they lived in Little Cassiobury. Designed by Elizabeth, Lady Wilbraham, in the late 17th century it was built as the Cassiobury Estate's dower house, which still exists in Hempstead Road, Watford.

Military offices
Preceded by Sir John Gore	Commander-in-Chief, East Indies and China Station; 1834–1837	Succeeded by Sir Frederick Maitland
Preceded by Sir Charles Ogle	Commander-in-Chief, Portsmouth; 1848–1851	Succeeded by Sir Thomas Briggs
