= Umar Makram =

Egyptian politician (1750–1822)

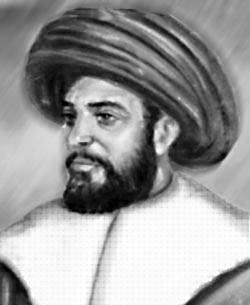
Umar Makram

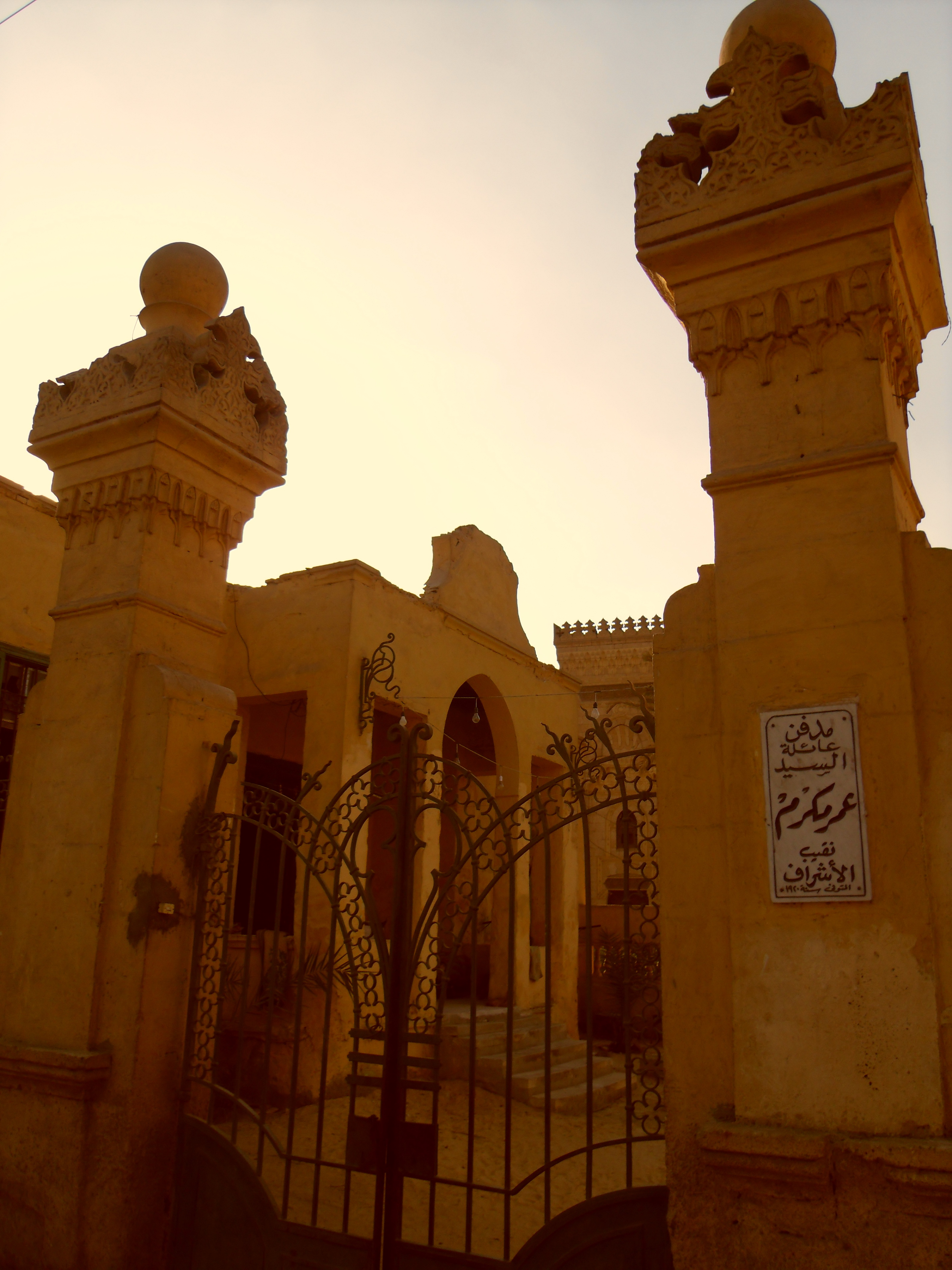
Tomb of Omar Makram in the El-Megawreen Necropolis, in the Northern Cemetery of Cairo

Umar Makram bin Husein al-Sayouti (Arabic: عمر مكرم بن حسين السيوطي, 1750–1822) was an Egyptian political leader at the time of the 1798 French invasion and in the subsequent political disorders.

== Biography ==
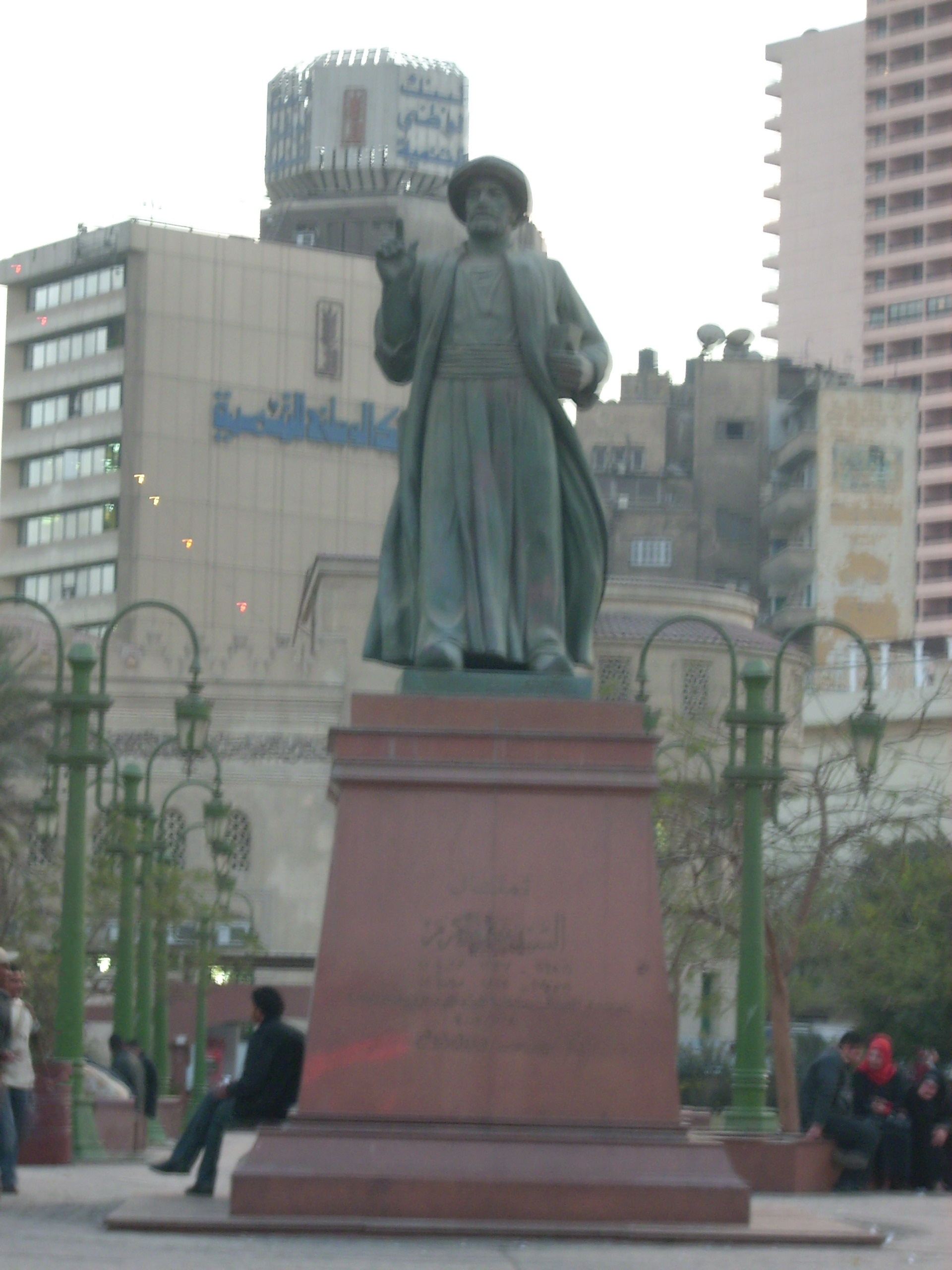
Omar Makram Statue near Omar Makram Mosque - Tahrir square - Cairo

Umar Makram was born in 1750 in Asyut. He was educated at Al-Azhar University, and became a leader of the nobility of Egypt and a national figure. He was prominent in leading Egyptian resistance to the 1798 invasion of Egypt by France (led by Napoleon).

After the French withdrew from Egypt in 1801, a power struggle ensued between the Mamluks, the United Kingdom and the Ottoman Empire, and Egypt was nominally restored to the Ottoman Empire. Umar Makram allied with Muhammed Ali, the commander of the Albanian troops within the army sent by the Empire to restore order.

In May 1805, Egyptians led by Umar Makram forced the Ottoman Sultan at the time, Selim III to replace the Wali Ahmed Khurshid Pasha with Muhammed Ali. Britain disagreed with this decision and attempted to invade Egypt in the Alexandria expedition of 1807.

Umar Makram soon discovered that Muhammed Ali planned to rule Egypt by himself and objected to a foreign ruler. Muhammed Ali exiled Umar Makram to Damietta on 9 August 1809, where he stayed for four years. Makram then moved to Tanta, where he died in 1822.

== Legacy ==
A mosque named for him and designed by Mario Rossi stands in Tahrir Square in Cairo. An exhibition on his life was recently celebrated at the Louvre in Paris, France.
