= Thomas George Shortland =

British Royal Navy captain

Captain Thomas George Shortland
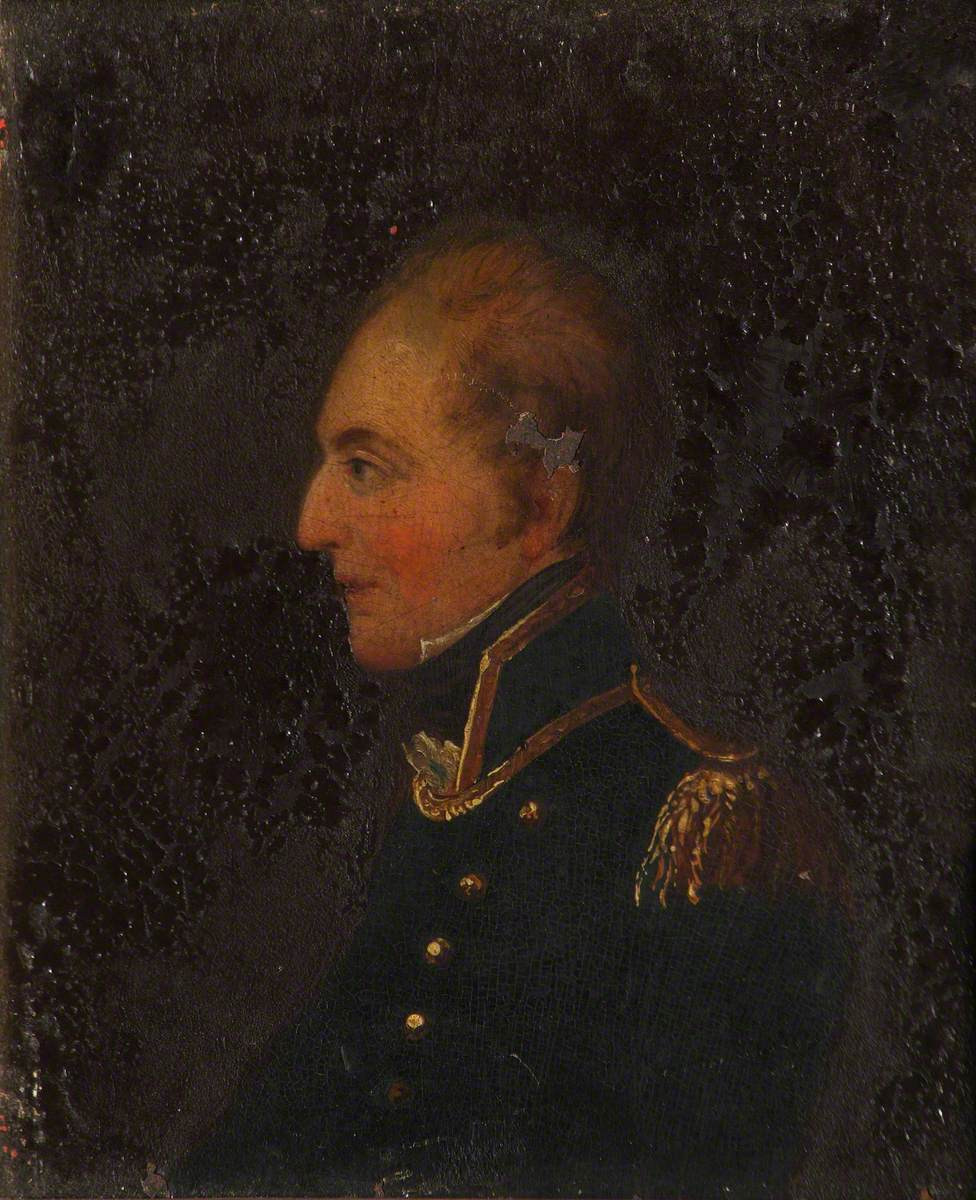
- Born: 10 May 1771; Portsea
- Died: 1827 (aged 55–56)
- Occupation: Royal Navy captain

Thomas George Shortland (10 May 1771 – 1827) was a British Royal Navy captain.

== Biography ==
Shortland was the brother of Captain John Shortland. He was born at Portsea on 10 May 1771. In January 1785 he entered the navy on board the Irresistible, then flying the broad pennant of Sir Andrew Snape Hamond in the Channel. In March 1787 he was moved to the Alexander, one of the little squadron going out to New South Wales with Commodore Arthur Phillip, and served in her till her return to England in May 1789. He was then employed in the Channel and North Sea, and on 19 November 1790 was promoted to be lieutenant of the Speedy sloop. In January 1793 he was appointed to the Nemesis frigate, which accompanied the fleet under Lord Hood to the Mediterranean. In September 1794 he was moved into the Romney, with Sir Charles Hamilton, whom, in April 1795, he followed to the Melpomene. On the night of 3–4 August 1798 he commanded the boats of the frigate in cutting out the Aventurier armed brig from under the batteries in the bay of Corréjou, on the north coast of Brittany—a gallant exploit, for which he was promoted to the rank of commander on 20 April 1799, and appointed to the Voltigeur sloop on the Newfoundland station. In the summer of 1801 he was appointed temporarily to the 80-gun ship Donegal, then in dock at Plymouth, and, as a reward for his extraordinary exertions in fitting her for sea, was made acting captain of the Dédaigneuse frigate, in which rank and command he was confirmed on 1 March 1802. He then took the ship out to the East Indies, but was compelled by ill-health to return to England in the spring of 1803. He was afterwards for a short time captain of the Britannia, and of the Cæsar, bearing the flag of Sir Richard John Strachan. In the summer of 1806 he joined the Canopus, as flag-captain to Sir Thomas Louis, and commanded that ship when she led the squadron of Sir John Thomas Duckworth through the Dardanelles in February and March 1807. After the death of Louis, Shortland continued for some months in command of the Canopus, but in September 1807 was moved into the Queen, still in the Mediterranean, and remained in her till the end of 1808. In 1809 he commanded the Valiant in the expedition to the Scheldt; in 1810–11 the Iris frigate, off Cadiz and in the West Indies; and in 1812–13 the Royal Oak as flag-captain to Lord Amelius Beauclerk. In November 1813 he was appointed agent for prisoners-of-war at Dartmoor; from April 1816 to April 1819 he was captain-superintendent of the ordinary at Plymouth; and for the next three years was comptroller-general of the preventive boat service. On 14 July 1825 he was appointed resident commissioner at Jamaica, where he died towards the end of 1827. He married Elizabeth, daughter of Peter Tonkin of Plymouth, and by her had a large family. Three of his sons, Edward, Peter Frederick, and Willoughby, are separately noticed.
