= HMS Repulse (1803) =

Ship of the line of the Royal Navy

- Plan drawing of Repulse

History

United Kingdom
- Name: Repulse
- Ordered: 4 February 1800
- Builder: Deptford Dockyard
- Laid down: September 1800
- Launched: 22 July 1803
- Commissioned: July 1803
- Fate: Broken up, 1820

General characteristics
- Class & type: Repulse-class ship of the line
- Tons burthen: 1,727 23/94 (bm)
- Length: 174 ft (53 m) (gundeck)
- Beam: 47 ft 8 in (14.5 m)
- Draught: 17 ft 6 in (5.3 m) (light)
- Depth of hold: 20 ft (6.1 m)
- Sail plan: Full-rigged ship
- Complement: 590
- Armament: 74 muzzle-loading, smoothbore guns; Gundeck: 28 × 32 pdr guns; Upper deck: 28 × 18 pdr guns; Quarterdeck: 2 × 18 pdr guns + 12 × 32 pdr carronades; Forecastle: 2 × 18 pdr guns + 2 × 32 pdr carronades; Poop deck: 6 × 18 pdr carronades

HMS Repulse was the name ship of her class of 74-gun third-rate ships of the line built for the Royal Navy in the first decade of the 19th century. Completed in 1803, she played a minor role in the Napoleonic Wars, participating in the Battle of Cape Finisterre in 1805.

== Description ==
Repulse measured 174 feet (53 m) on the gundeck and 142 feet 11 inches (43.6 m) on the keel. She had a beam of 47 feet 8 inches (14.5 m), a depth of hold of 20 feet (6.1 m) and had a tonnage of 1,727 23/94 tons burthen. The ship's draught was 13 feet 3 inches (4.0 m) forward and 17 feet 6 inches (5.3 m) aft at light load; fully loaded, her draught would be significantly deeper. The Repulse-class ships were armed with 74 muzzle-loading, smoothbore guns that consisted of twenty-eight 32-pounder guns on her lower gundeck and twenty-eight 18-pounder guns on her upper gundeck. Their forecastle mounted a pair of 18-pounder guns and two 32-pounder carronades. On their quarterdeck they carried two 18-pounders and a dozen 32-pounder carronades. Above the quarterdeck was their poop deck with half-a-dozen 18-pounder carronades. Their crew numbered 590 officers and ratings. The ships were fitted with three masts and ship-rigged.

== Construction and career ==
Repulse was the seventh ship of her name to serve in the Royal Navy. She was ordered on 4 February 1800 as part of the first batch of three Repulse-class ships of the line designed by Sir William Rule, co-Surveyor of the Navy. The ship was laid down at Deptford Dockyard in September and was launched on 21 July 1803. She was commissioned by Captain Arthur Kaye Legge that same month and completed at Woolwich Dockyard by 5 October.

In 1805, Repulse took part in the Battle of Cape Finisterre. In 1807 the ship served in the Mediterranean squadron under Vice-Admiral John Thomas Duckworth and Vice-Admiral Harry Riddick during the Dardanelles Operation and the Alexandria expedition of 1807.

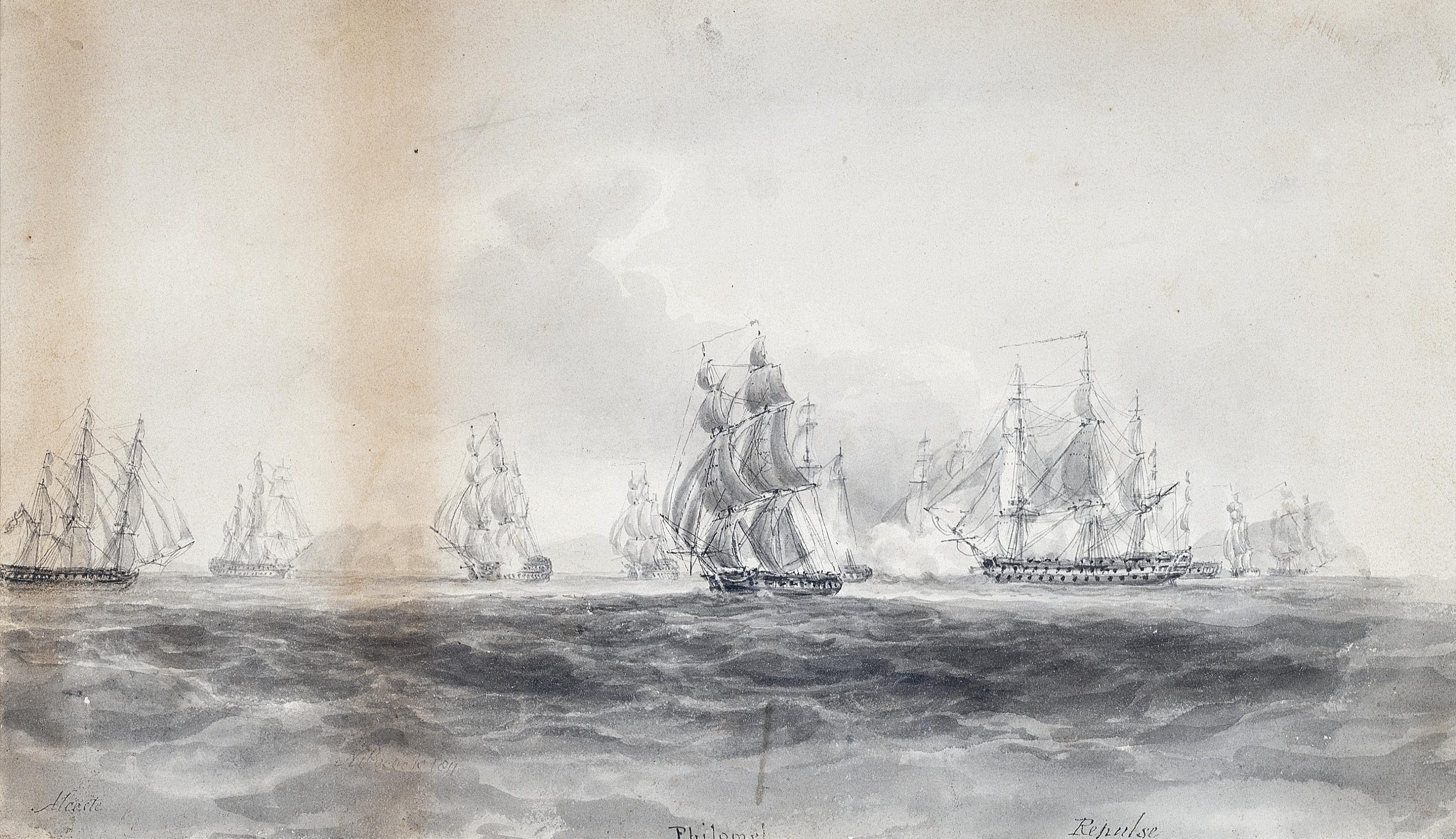
Captain Halliday of Repulse saving HMS Philomel from capture by the French off Toulon, 31 August 1810, Nicholas Pocock

She was broken up in 1820.
