= Louis baronets =

Former title in the Baronetage of UK

The Louis Baronetcy, of Chelston in the County of Devon, was a title in the Baronetage of the United Kingdom. It was created on 1 April 1806 to reward the service of Admiral Thomas Louis at the Battle of San Domingo in 1806. It passed to his son John Louis, later an admiral himself, on his death the following year and remained extant until the death of the fifth Baronet, Sir Charles Louis, in 1949.

== Louis baronets, of Chelston (1806) ==
- Sir Thomas Louis, 1st Baronet (1758–1807)
- Sir John Louis, 2nd Baronet (1785–1863)
- Sir John Louis, 3rd Baronet (1832–1893)
- Sir Charles Louis, 4th Baronet (1813–1900)
- Sir Charles Louis, 5th Baronet (1859–1949)

Coat of arms of Louis of Chelston
| Crest A griffin's head erased Azure, between two wings elevated Or, in the beak a fleur-de-lis, on the breast a trident erect Or. Escutcheon Azure, a lion rampant argent charged on the shoulder with an eagle displayed Sable, and holding in the paws a fleur-de-lis Or; on a chief wavy ermine an anchor erect of the Third, the shank surrounded with a naval coronet, the rim Azure, sterns and sails Proper. Supporters Dexter: a British sailor habited proper, his exterior hand supporting a staff, thereon hoisted a flag Argent charged with a cross Gules, surmounted by a pair of wings Or, and inscribed with the words "St. Domingo" in base Sable; sinister: an allegorical figure representing the Nile, head and upper part of the face concealed by a veil Argent, the mantle Vert inscribed with hieroglyph wreathed about the waist with bulrushes Proper, in the exterior hand an ancient rudder Or. Motto In canopo ut ad canopum |

== Notes ==
Baronetage of the United Kingdom
| Preceded by Sutton baronets | Louis baronets of Chelston; 1 April 1806 | Succeeded by Lubbock baronets |
