= Ernest Missett =

British consul-general in Egypt

- Born: ca. 1764
- Died: 22 September 1820 (aged 55–56); Florence, Italy
- Resting place: Livorno
- Known for: Consul-general in Egypt

Lt. Col. Ernest Missett (ca.1764 – 22 September 1820) was the British consul-general in Egypt from 1803 to 1816. He was instrumental in consulting with the Mamelukes during the Battle of Rosetta.

== Military career ==
The earliest known information regarding his military career begins in France as a Second Lieutenant but was promoted to Captain in 1796. In 1799 he was appointed Captain in Stuart's Minorca Regiment. Missett was promoted to Brigade Major in 1801, the same year he took part in the Battle of Alexandria, where he was wounded by a saber. He would later be promoted to Lt. Colonel in 1811.

== Consul General ==
In 1803, Charles Stuart appointed Missett, who had been his Military Secretary, to be the British Agent in Egypt. This was later changed to Consul General. During his time in Egypt, Missett hosted many travelers, such as James Silk Buckingham, Lady Hester Stanhope, Giovanni Belzoni & J.L. Burkhardt.

== Personal life ==
Little is known of Missett's personal life, other than what is recorded by guests of his home in Alexandria. Sometime around 1804, he lost the use of his limbs. He had a wife named Giuseppa, who is only ever mentioned in his will. He kept a pet Chameleon.

== See also ==
- History of Egypt under the British
