= Mackworth (1779 ship) =

Merchant ship hired as armed ship

History

Great Britain
- Name: Mackworth
- Namesake: Originally: Mackworth family; 1786:Ceres, Fife
- Launched: 1779, Neath
- Renamed: Ceres (1786)
- Fate: Last listed 1794

General characteristics
- Tons burthen: 196, or 200 (bm)
- Complement: 78
- Armament: 2 × 9-pounder + 8 × 6-pounder +6 × 4-pounder + 4 × 3-pounder guns

Mackworth was launched at Neath in 1779. The Admiralty immediately hired her and from June 1779 to March 1783 she served as an armed ship. Between 1783 and 1786 Mackworth traded with the Baltic and the West Indies. In 1786 new owners renamed her Ceres. Ceres was last listed in 1794 with data unchanged since 1791.

== Career ==
Commander James Dickson commissioned Mackworth on 19 June 1779. From 9 April 1781, she was under the command of Commander Thomas Louis in the Irish Sea. He was promoted to Commander in her and she was Louis's first independent command.

Mackworth apparently often sailed in company with Lady Mackworth, both vessels being owned by A. Jones & Co. They sailed between Plymouth and the Bristol Channel, escorting convoys.

On 26 August 1781, the armed ships Mackworth and Lady Mackworth were at Milford. They had escorted the trade from Swansea, Bristol, etc.

On 6 June 1782, the armed ships Lady Mackworth, James Dickson, and Mackworth, Thomas Louis, recaptured two merchant vessels, the brigs Merchant and Elizabeth. A French privateer of 18 guns and 120 men had captured the two brigs the day before.

On 14 June 1782 Commander John Douglas commissioned Mackworth for the Irish Sea. However he died on 12 July. Her last naval captain was Commander William Don (or Donne), who commanded her from 25 December 1782 to 3 March 1783, when the Navy returned her to her owners.

By mid-1783, Mackworth, Button, master, was trading between Falmouth and Peterburg. In 1785 Mackworth, Hamon, master, was trading with the West Indies.

Mackworth first appeared in Lloyd's Register in 1786 as a West Indiaman, when she became Ceres, Bonthron, master.

Year	Vessel	Master	Owner	Trade	Source
1786	Mackworth	T.Y.Immerch?	Jones & Co.	London–Grenada	LR
1786	Ceres	Bonthron	Buchannan	London–Amsterdam; London–Providence	LR

There is no online issue of LR for 1788, and Ceres was not listed in 1789.

Year	Vessel	Master	Owner	Trade	Source
1790	Ceres	Bonthron; T.Havelock	Buchannan; W.Havelock	Honduras–London	LR
1791	Ceres	T.Havelock	W.Havelock	New York–Lynn	LR

== Fate ==
Ceres was last listed in 1794 with data unchanged since 1791.
