= Arthur Kaye Legge =

Royal Navy Admiral (1766–1835)

Admiral Sir Arthur Kaye Legge KCB
- Born: 25 October 1766
- Died: 12 May 1835 (aged 68); Blackheath, Kent
- Military career
- Allegiance: Kingdom of Great Britain
- Branch: Royal Navy
- Rank: Admiral
- Conflicts: American Revolutionary War; French Revolutionary Wars; Glorious First of June; Napoleonic Wars; Battle of Cape Finisterre; Dardanelles operation; Walcheren Campaign

Admiral Sir Arthur Kaye Legge KCB (25 October 1766 – 12 May 1835) was an officer of the British Royal Navy who served in three wars and commanded ships in several campaigns. Known as a brave officer and an effective commander, Legge was given several very important postings in the latter part of his career as a rear-admiral, serving in command at Cádiz during the Peninsular War. After retirement, Legge entered royal service, and was in the procession at the funeral of King George III. A very wealthy man, Legge never married, and when he died in 1835 he left large sums of money to his domestic staff.

== Early career ==
Arthur Kaye Legge was born in 1766, the sixth son of William Legge, 2nd Earl of Dartmouth and his wife Frances-Catherine. Among his siblings were George Legge, 3rd Earl of Dartmouth, Edward Legge, Bishop of Oxford and Lady Charlotte Feversham, the wife of Lord Feversham. Entering the Navy at a young age, Legge served aboard HMS Prince George with the young Prince William off the Eastern Seaboard of North America.

By 1791, Legge was a lieutenant and held an independent command in the Channel Fleet as captain of HMS Shark. The outbreak of the French Revolutionary Wars in 1793 saw Legge promoted, becoming a post captain in the frigate HMS Niger. In this vessel, Legge served in the fleet under Lord Howe that fought in the Atlantic campaign of May 1794 and the ensuing Glorious First of June. As a frigate captain, Legge was not actively engaged in the battle, but did perform numerous scouting missions during the campaign, relayed signals to the fleet during the battle and gave a tow to badly damaged ships in its aftermath.

In 1795, Legge took command of HMS Latona and formed part of the squadron that escorted Caroline of Brunswick to Britain before her marriage to Prince George. In 1797 he moved to HMS Cambrian and operated independently off the French Channel coast, sailing from Weymouth. During these services he frequently spent time with royalty visiting the port and captured a number of French prizes. Legge remained in command of Cambrian until the Peace of Amiens in 1802.

With the outbreak of the Napoleonic Wars in 1803, Legge was recalled to the Navy and took command of the ship of the line HMS Repulse. In 1805 Repulse was ordered to cruise off the Spanish coast and captured a valuable Spanish merchantship and also participated in the Battle of Cape Finisterre under Robert Calder against the combined Franco-Spanish fleet of Pierre-Charles Villeneuve. By 1807, Revenge was stationed with the Mediterranean Fleet and participated in the Dardanelles Operation under John Thomas Duckworth. During the attempt to reach Constantinople, Revenge suffered ten men killed and 14 wounded. Legge was later part of the naval contingent in the Walcheren Expedition and, with thousands of his men, contracted malaria and was evacuated home, severely ill.

== Flag rank ==
In July 1810, Legge was promoted to rear-admiral and the following year was appointed to be commander at Cádiz in Revenge. The Spanish port was an important position as it was the seat of the Spanish government during the Peninsular War which was raging at that time. Legge performed well in this position and returned to Britain in September 1812 to become admiral in command of the River Thames. Legge held this command, from the frigate HMS Thisbe until the end of the war in 1815.

As a member of the nobility, Legge had numerous royal contacts, and became a Groom of the Bedchamber to King George III in 1801, a position that he held in London until 1812 and afterwards at Windsor, to where the mentally unbalanced king had retreated, until the king's death in 1820. Legge later marched in the procession at George III's funeral.

By the time of his retirement, Legge had risen to vice-admiral and been made a Knight Commander of the Order of the Bath. He later became a full admiral in 1830. Legge never married, and on his death in 1835, he was reported to have left over £3,000 to his butler, £1,000 each to his groom, footman, coachman and housekeeper and other substantial amounts to his other servants. He was buried in the family vault in Lewisham.
