= HMS Meteor (1803) =

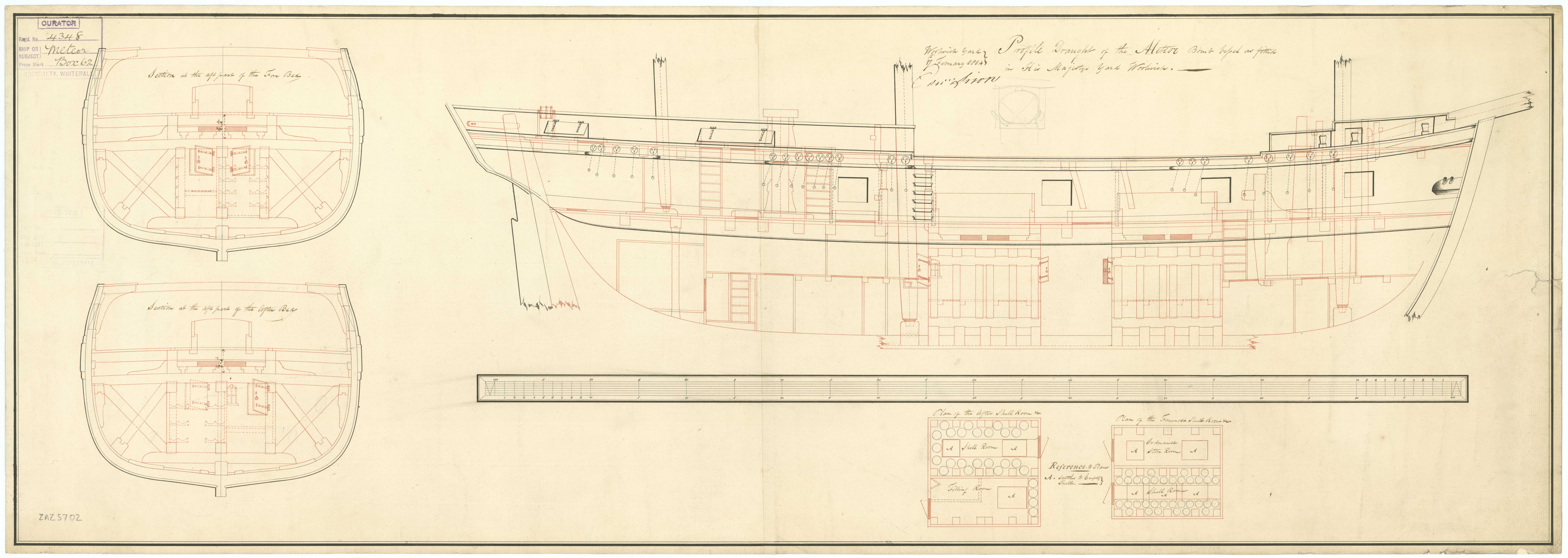
- Meteor

History

Great Britain
- Name: Sarah Ann
- Builder: Newcastle
- Launched: 1800
- Fate: Sold 1803

United Kingdom
- Name: HMS Meteor
- Acquired: 1803 by purchase
- Fate: Sold 1811

United Kingdom
- Name: Sarah Ann
- Builder: Newcastle
- Acquired: 1811 by purchase
- Fate: Last listed 1863

General characteristics
- Class & type: bomb vessel
- Tons burthen: 327, or 364, or 374, or 382 (bm)
- Length: Overall: 103 ft (31.4 m), or 101 ft 9 in (31.0 m); Keel:80 ft (24.4 m)
- Beam: 29 ft (8.8 m), or 29 ft 5 in (9.0 m)
- Depth of hold: 12 ft 11 in (3.9 m)
- Propulsion: Sails
- Complement: 67
- Armament: Sarah Ann:2 × 6-pounder guns + 6 × 18-pounder carronades; Meteor:8 × 24-pounder carronades + 1 × 13" mortar + 1 × 10" mortar

HMS Meteor was a bomb vessel of the Royal Navy. She was previously the West Indiaman Sarah Ann, launched at Newcastle upon Tyne in 1800 that the Admiralty purchased in October 1803. She conducted bombardments at Havre de Grâce, the Dardanelles, and Rosas Bay, on the Spanish coast. She was sold in 1811. she then returned to mercantile service under her original name, Sarah Ann. She continued to trade, primarily across the North Atlantic. She was last listed in 1863 with stale data.

== Merchantman ==
Sarah Ann was built in Newcastle upon Tyne in 1800. Her registry was immediately transferred to London. She first appeared in Lloyd's Register (LR) in 1801 with J.Hunter, master, Dawson & Co., owner, and trade London–Jamaica. She appeared in for 1803 with J.Hunter, master, Dawson, owner, and trade London–Jamaica.

== Naval vessel ==
Meteor was commissioned in December 1803 under Commander James Masters. In May 1804 Commander Joseph James replaced Masters. She then participated in the bombardments of Le Havre on 23 July 1804 as part of a squadron under Captain R. Dudley Oliver of Melpomene. At one point during the bombardment Meteor had to resupply two of her fellow bomb vessels, Explosion and Zebra with shells and powder. Over two days the bomb vessels conducted over four hours of bombardment, firing over 500 shells and carcasses into Le Havre and setting fires in the town. Meteor shared with the rest of the squadron in the prize money after Favourite captured the Shepherdess on 21 July, and after Explosion captured the Postilion on 31 July.

Next, and 1 August 1804, Meteor participated in a bombardment of Boulogne. She also participated is several actions off Boulogne.

On 13 April 1805, Meteor captured the Kniphausen ship Brant. On 30 May 1805, Meteor was in company with Entreprenant when they captured the Prussian sloop Omnibus. (Note: The prize money for a seaman was £5 9s 10d. This sum would have amounted to about three months' wages for the seaman.)

In October Meteor come under the command of James Collins. On 15 November Meteor was in company with the gun-brig Speedwell when they captured the American brig Venus.

On 10 March 1806 the cutter Lord Nelson arrived at Cork. She had been captured, but Meteor had recaptured her.

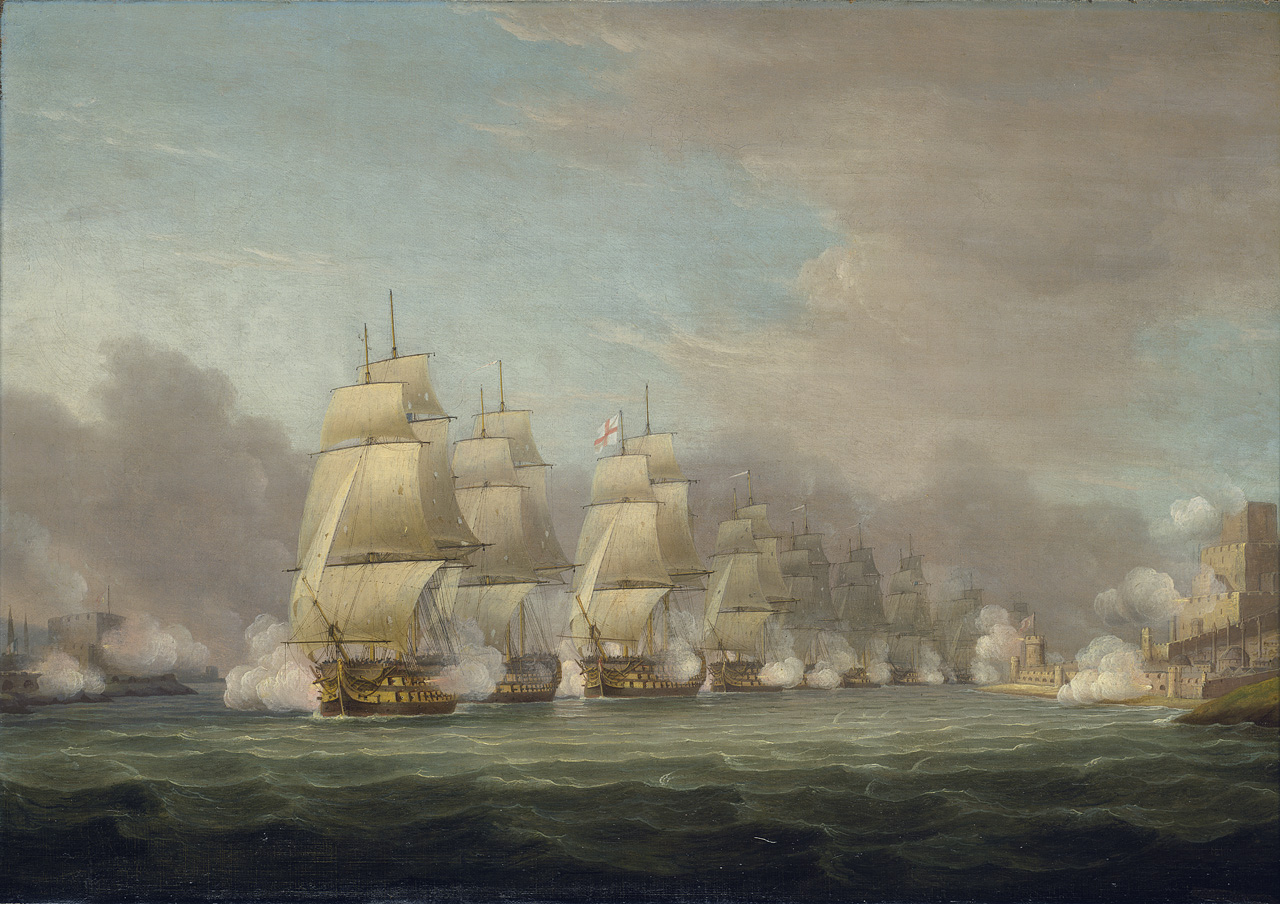
The squadron under the command of Sir J T Duckworth forcing the narrow channel of the Dardanelles, February 19th 1807, by Thomas Whitcombe

Collins sailed Meteor to the Mediterranean on 10 January 1807. There, Meteor was a member of Admiral Sir John Duckworth's Dardanelles expedition against the Turks. She had the misfortune to burst her 13-inch mortar while forcing a passage through the Dardanelles, and her 10-inch mortar on the way back. During the action on 3 March Meteor suffered eight men wounded, including one badly.

Although details are missing, Meteor apparently next participated in an attack on batteries and gun-boats in the Bay of Naples.

From about 6 November 1808 on, still under Collins's command, Meteor took part in the defense of the Ciutadella de Roses and Fort Trinidad (Castell de la Trinitat) at Rosas Bay in northeastern Spain. She was in company with the Third Rate Excellent under Captain John West. Gunfire and bombardment from Excellent and Meteor helped repel several French attacks, and a landing party of Marines and seamen reinforced the Spanish garrisons. The bomb vessel Lucifer and the Third Rates Fame and Magnificent arrived later, with the frigate Imperieuse under Captain Lord Cochrane joining the defense towards the end of November. Despite British assistance, the citadel capitulated to the French on 5 December. Cochrane, seeing that further resistance was useless, blew up the magazines at Trinity Castle and withdrew together with his landing party. In the fighting on 7 and 20 November, eight men on Meteor were wounded, one, a Royal Marine gunner, losing both arms. Meteor also took on board the Spanish governor, who had been wounded.

Meteor sailed to the Dalmatian coast, where her boats cut out a privateer.

Disposal: Meteor was paid off into ordinary in June 1810, and Collins was promoted to post-captain on 21 October 1810. She was sold on 28 May 1811.

== Merchantman ==
George and Charles Garthorne Burrell, of North Shields, purchased Meteor and registered her as Sarah Ann at Newcastle on 24 November 1811. She first reappeared in Lloyd's Register in 1815.

Year	Master	Owner	Trade	Source
1815	Meldrum	North Shields	Liverpool–New York	LR; good repair 1811
1820	Meldrum	Garthorne	Liverpool–Quebec	LR

On 15 August 1818 Sarah Ann was coming from Miramichi, New Brunswick, to Grangemouth when she stranded on Rattray Head. She was gotten off on 17 August with the loss of her rudder and other damage. She then arrived at the Pier Head (Aberdeen) in a waterlogged state.

The crew of the barque George abandoned her November 1823 in the Atlantic Ocean. Sarah Ann, Meldrum, master, rescued the crew. George was on a voyage from Quebec City to Liverpool.

Year	Master	Owner	Trade	Source & notes
1825	Meldrum	Burrell & Co.	Liverpool–New Brunswick	LR; large repair 1818
1830	R.Mitcalf	Burrell & Co.	Liverpool–Sierra Leone	LR; small repairs 1823 and good repair 1826
1835	J.Knott			LR
1840	B.Taylor	C.Burrell	Shields–uebec	LR; large repair 1837; homeport of North shields
1845	Fortune	Burrell & Co.	Liverpool–Quebec; Liverpool–"Restigh"	LR; large repair 1837 & damages repaired 1844
1850	Fortune	Burrell & Co.		
1855	T.Aylwood	DeWolfe & Co.	Liverpool–Charleston	LR; keel and small repairs 1852
1860	D.Evans	Pugh & Co.		LR
1863	D.Evans	Pugh & Co.		LR
