= HMS Royal George (1788) =

Ship of the line of the Royal Navy

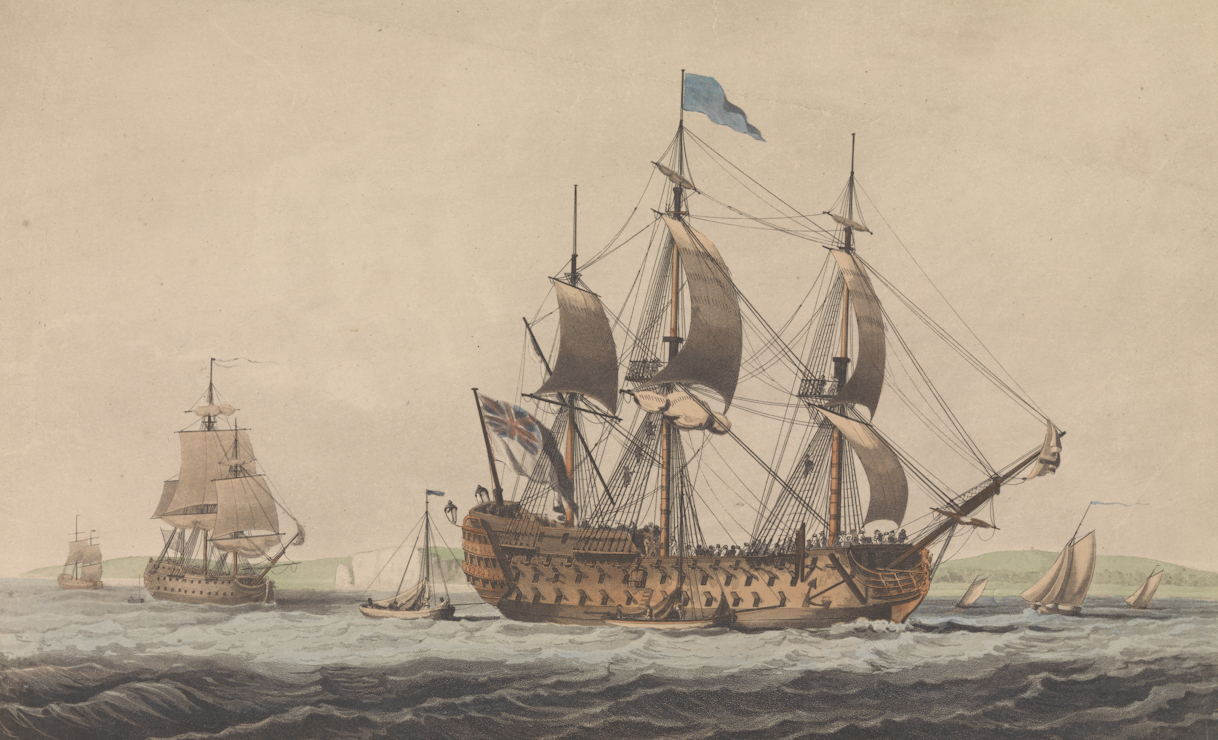
- 1806 illustration of Royal George (centre-left)

History

Great Britain
- Name: HMS Royal George
- Builder: Chatham Dockyard
- Laid down: June 1784
- Launched: 16 September 1788
- Honours and awards: Participated in: Battle of Groix; Glorious First of June
- Fate: Broken up, 1822

General characteristics
- Class & type: 100-gun first rate ship of the line
- Tons burthen: 2286 bm
- Length: 190 ft (58 m) (gundeck)
- Beam: 52 ft 5 1/2 in (15.989 m)
- Depth of hold: 22 ft 4 in (6.81 m)
- Propulsion: Sails
- Sail plan: Full-rigged ship
- Armament: Gundeck: 30 × 42-pounder guns; Middle gundeck: 28 × 24-pounder guns; Upper gundeck: 30 × 12-pounder guns; QD: 10 × 12-pounder guns; Fc: 2 × 12-pounder guns

HMS Royal George was a 100-gun first rate ship of the line of the Royal Navy, launched from Chatham Dockyard on 16 September 1788. She was designed by Sir Edward Hunt, and Queen Charlotte was the only other ship built to her draught. She was the fifth ship of the Royal Navy to bear the name.

Royal George served as the flagship at the Battle of Groix and wore the flag of Admiral Alexander Hood at the Glorious First of June. In 1807 she served as the flagship of Admiral Sir John Duckworth during the Alexandria expedition of 1807.

She was broken up in 1822.
