= Alexandria expedition of 1807 =

Failed attempt by the British to capture the Egyptian city of Alexandria

- Part of the Anglo-Turkish War of 1807–1809
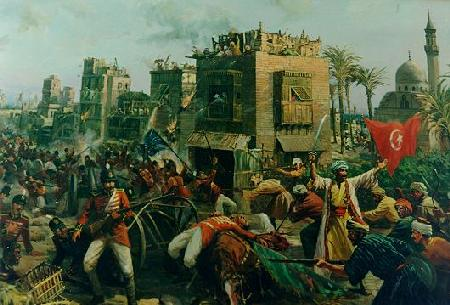
- Battle of Rosetta
Date	18 March – 25 September 1807
Location	Alexandria, Egypt
Result	Egyptian victory: Mohammed Ali cements control over Egypt

Belligerents
(United Kingdom of Great Britain and Ireland) United Kingdom	Egypt Eyalet

Commanders and leaders
(United Kingdom of Great Britain and Ireland) General Alexander Mackenzie-Fraser (United Kingdom of Great Britain and Ireland) Major-General Patrick Wauchope of Edmonstone † (United Kingdom of Great Britain and Ireland) Admiral Sir John Duckworth, 1st Baronet (United Kingdom of Great Britain and Ireland) Brigadier the Hon. Robert Meade (WIA)	Muhammad Ali Pasha; Umar Makram; Tabuzoglu Pasha; Hasan Pasha; Ali Bey Al-Slanki

Strength
7,500–9,500 British regulars 5,000+ foreign troops	4,000–6,000 infantry (Tabuzoglu division), 1,500 cavalry (Hassan Pasha division), 700 infantry (Rosetta's garrison) and an unknown but large numbers of Egyptian irregular troops and armed civilians (fellahin)

Casualties and losses
950+ killed 200+ wounded 400 captured	Unknown

The Alexandria expedition of 1807, also known as the Fraser expedition, as an unsuccessful attempt by British forces to capture the Egyptian city of Alexandria during the Anglo-Turkish War. The aim was to secure a base of operations against the Ottoman Empire and the French Empire in the Mediterranean Sea. It was part of a larger British strategy against the Franco-Ottoman alliance negotiated by Sultan Selim III.

Although Alexandria was quickly captured and occupied, British attempts to proceed inland were rebuffed, resulting in the invaders being defeated twice in battles at Rosetta (Rashid; the port that guarded the entrance to the Nile), sustaining hundreds of casualties. Many were captured during the second siege of Rosetta. British prisoners of war were marched to Cairo, where many hundreds of severed heads from their slain comrades were displayed between rows of stakes. The prisoners were either condemned to hard labour or sold into slavery.

The remaining British forces in Egypt were forced to retreat to Alexandria, where they remained besieged and unable to gather supplies. Using this trapped army and his British prisoners as a bargaining tool, Viceroy Muhammad Ali compelled the British commanders to cease further operations in Egypt. The British then agreed to embark on their transports and leave Alexandria, having not gained any significant position of influence in Egypt or reached any specific goals towards influencing the Ottoman Empire's improving relations with France. In Egypt, the expedition united the populace behind Muhammad Ali, who proceeded to seize power.

== Background ==
The expedition began in mid-February 1807 when a force of British troops, deployed in Calabria and Sicily, were ordered by General Fox in Messina to embark on transports. The mission was rumoured to be destined for Constantinople. Meanwhile, John Thomas Duckworth, appointed second in command of the Mediterranean Fleet, sailed for Constantinople. However, he failed to provide effective support for Dmitry Senyavin's Imperial Russian Navy during the Dardanelles Operation. After departing from Constantinople, Duckworth, as an Admiral of the White Squadron, was to rendezvous with the transports in Aboukir Bay. By 17 March, the fleet of transports, with nearly 6,000 British troops embarked and approached Alexandria under the command of General Alexander Mackenzie-Fraser.

== Occupation of Alexandria ==
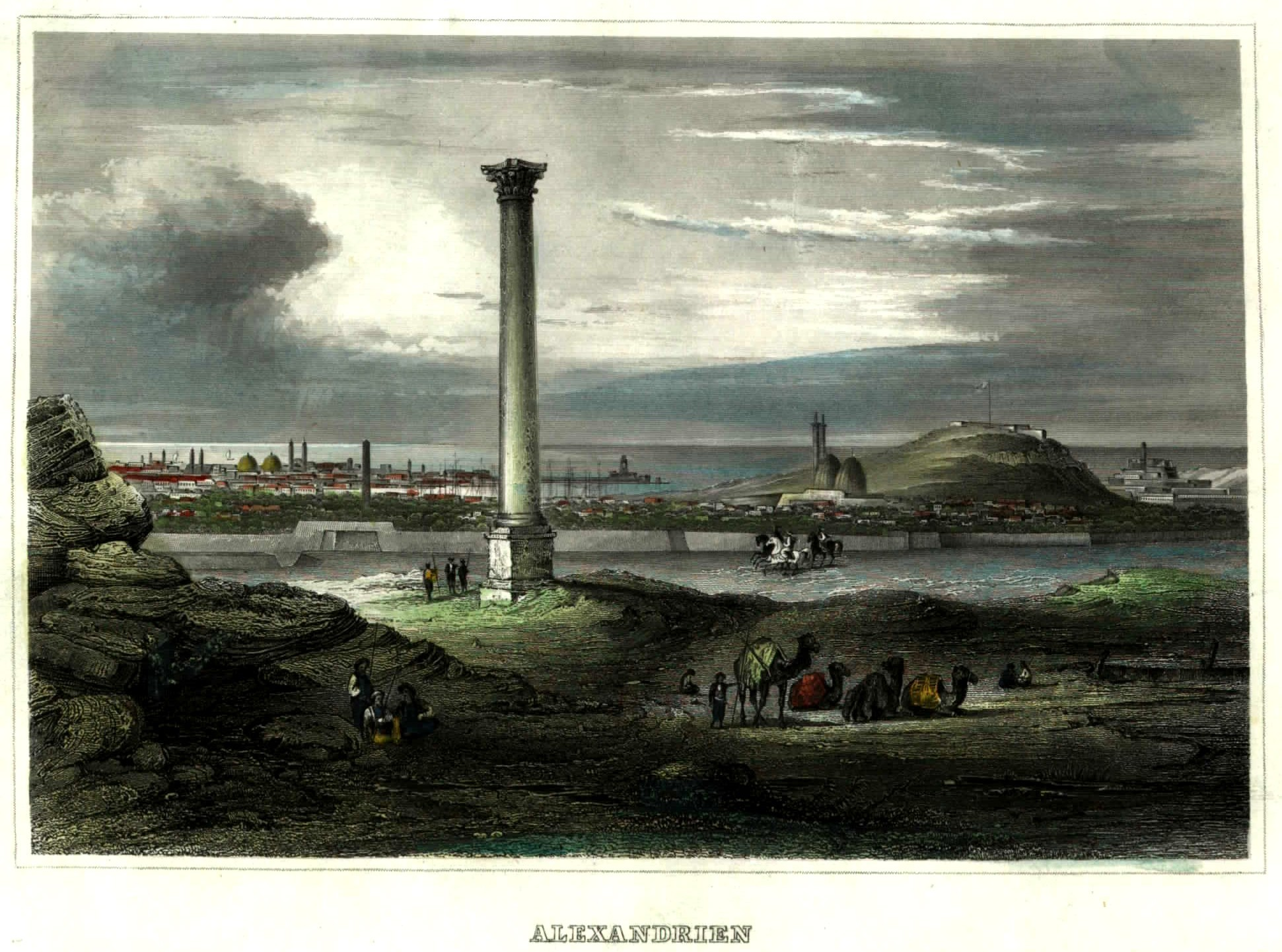
View of Pompey's Pillar with Alexandria in the background in c. 1850

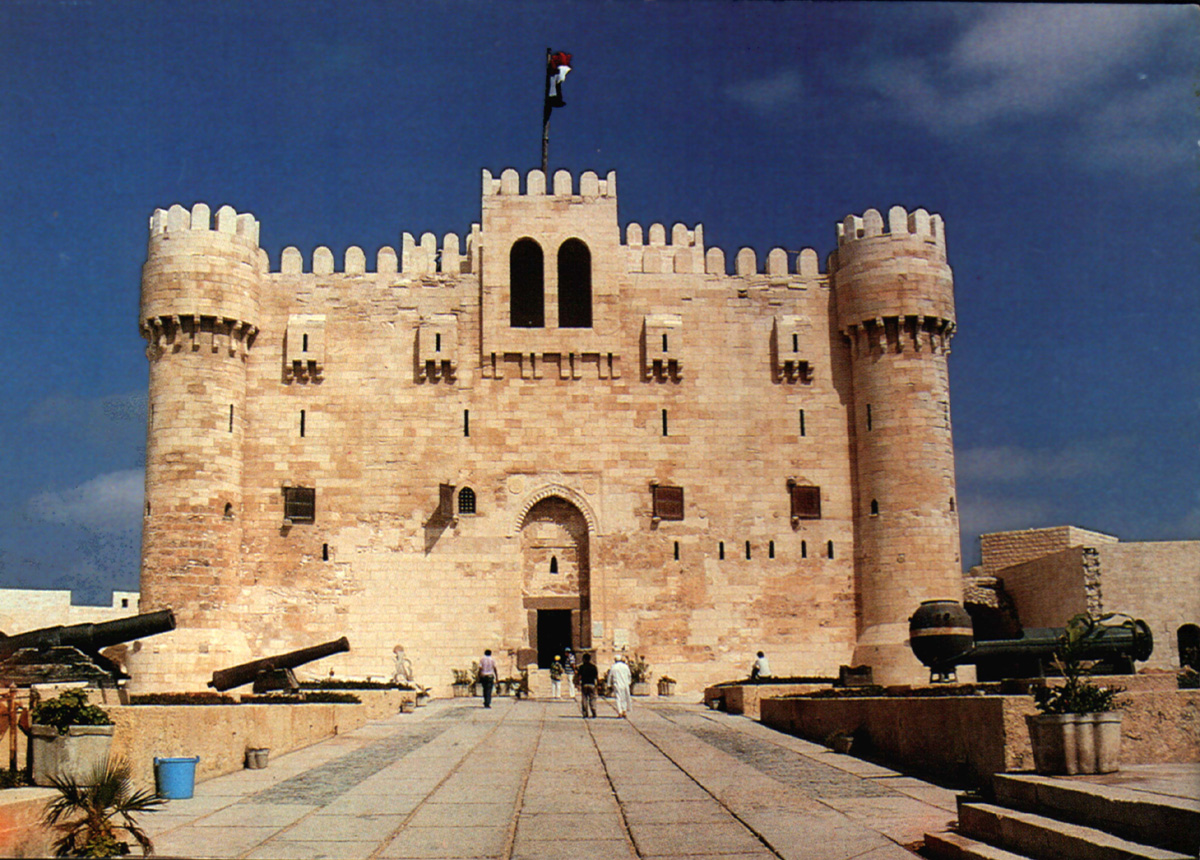
Front view of Qaitbay Citadel

The appearance of the British transports off Alexandria was unexpected. On 20 March, HMS Tigre captured two Ottoman frigates, Uri Bahar (40 guns) and Uri Nasard (34 guns), and the corvette Fara Numa (16 guns). (Note: The Royal Navy commissioned Uri Nasard and Fara Numa circa January 1808 and disposed of all three in 1809. Uri Bahar had twenty-eight 18-pounder guns on her upper deck, and six 8-pounder guns and six 18-pounder carronades on her QD and Fc. Captain George Hony (or Honey) took command of Uri Nasard. She was armed with twenty-six 12-pounder guns on her upper deck, and eight 6-pounders (QD/Fc). Commander Samuel Fowell became captain of Fara Numa.) HMS Apollo, along with 19 other transports, had separated from the main force on 7 March and did not participate in the initial landings.

At this time, the city garrison consisted of Albanian troops, with the French Consul-General, Bernardino Drovetti, attempting to force them to repel the British landing west of the city. (Note: Drovetti was a Piedmontese colonel who had served in the Egyptian campaign with Napoleon.) Despite the rough waves, nearly 700 troops with five field guns, along with 56 seamen commanded by Lieutenant James Boxer, were able to disembark without opposition near the ravine running from Lake Mareotis to the sea. These troops breached the palisaded entrenchments at eight on 18 March. Fortunately for the British, they did not encounter serious resistance because the lines stretching from Fort des Baines to Lake Mareotis included eight guns in three batteries and 13 guns in the fort on the right flank. British casualties were light; however, the Pompey Gate (also known as Pompey's Pillar), was barricaded and defended by about 1,000 Ottoman troops and armed volunteers, forcing the British troops to set up camp to the south. Two detachments were sent to occupy Aboukir Castle and the "Cut", Qaitbay Citadel, a castle in Alexandria between Lakes Maadia and Mareotis. The detachment's mission was to prevent Ottoman reinforcements from reaching the city. The next day, 20 March, the rest of the transports appeared off Alexandria, and an Arab messenger was sent with an offer of capitulation that was accepted by the city authorities. Sir John Thomas Duckworth appeared on 22 March, off Alexandria in his flagship HMS Royal George, with a part of his squadron, further bolstering the confidence of the British troops.

Upon the occupation of the city, Fraser and his staff first heard of the death of Muhammad Bey al-Alfi, upon whose cooperation they had founded their hopes of further success. Messengers were immediately dispatched to his successor and other local Beys, inviting them to Alexandria. The British Resident, Major Missett, with support from Duckworth, was able to convince General Mackenzie-Fraser of the importance of occupying Rosetta (Rashid) and Rahmanieh to secure supplies for Alexandria because they controlled the canal by which supplies were brought to the city via the Nile.

== Manoeuvring against Muhammad Ali ==
Muhammad Ali, meanwhile, was conducting an expedition against the Beys in Upper Egypt (he later defeated them near Assiut) when he heard of the arrival of the British. In great alarm, lest the Beys should join them, especially as they were far north of his position, he immediately sent messengers to his rivals. Ali promised to comply with all the Beys' demands if they should join his campaign against the British; this proposal being agreed to, both armies marched towards Cairo on opposite sides of the river.

== Battle of Rosetta ==
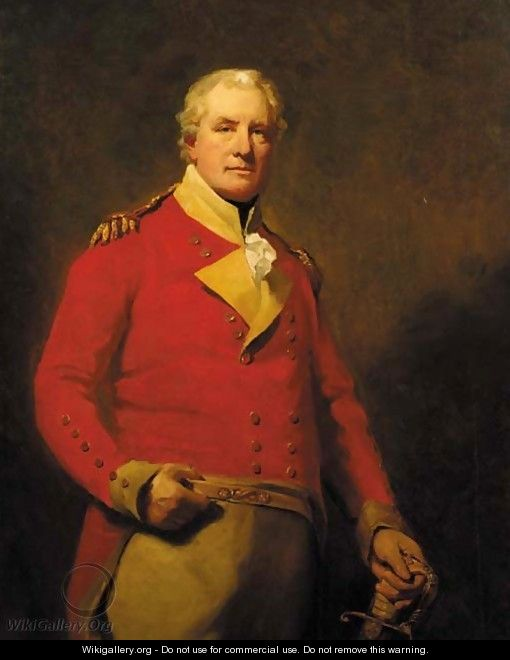
Alexander Mackenzie Fraser

On 21 March 1807, the local Ottoman force in Rashid, led by its governor Ali Bey Al-Selaniki, confronted the advancing British troops led by General Fraser, two years after Muhammad Ali assumed power in Egypt. The British had arrived in Egypt during the struggles between the governor Muhammad Ali and the Mamluks. The British signed a treaty with Muhammad Bey Al-Alfy, the leader of the Mamluks, to ensure his support of the British campaign in exchange for a British guarantee that the Mamluks would establish control over Egypt if the British expedition were successful. However, Al-Alfy died before this expedition reached Egypt.

The plan was for the Mamluks to march to Cairo to occupy it. At the same time, the British would capture several strategically important Egyptian ports, and then march to the Delta and occupy Cairo, provided that the Mamluks assisted their forces in Egypt, especially the Millennium Front. General Fraser was in Alexandria, had received a report from the British Consul in Rashid on the state of Egypt and its forces, which made him march overland to Rashid to occupy it and establish a military base for his forces, and assigned the commander 'and is serving' this military mission.

Five hundred troops of the 31st Foot and the Chasseurs Britanniques were detached, accompanied by a section of Royal Artillery, under Major-General Patrick Wauchope and Brigadier-General the Honourable Robert Meade.

Wauchope moved in 2,500 soldiers from Alexandria to Rashid. The Governor of Rashid, Ali Bey Al-Selaniki, and his 700 soldiers, mustered to oppose the British advance. Sheikh Hassan Crere mobilised the general public to support the Egyptian forces, so he ordered the removal of the Egyptian boats from the front of the Nile, Rashid, to the eastern bank opposite the Green Island and a spindle tower in the Moutoubis county to prevent the people from getting over them and fleeing the city, so that his garrison men do not find a way to retreat, surrender or withdraw, as the Alexandria garrison did before. The garrison among the people became concealed in the homes inside the city of Rashid, as in front of them would only be skirmishing, and ordered them not to move or fire unless after the issuance of an agreed signal, so the British advanced and did not find any Egyptian troops. Hence, they believed that the city would surrender as the garrison of Alexandria did, so they safely entered the city's streets. They took a rest after walking in the sand from Alexandria to Rashid and spread in the city streets and markets to find places to take refuge and rest in. They almost did not rest until the call to prayer issued by the Selaniki order was launched from the minaret of the Sidi Zaghloul mosque, chanting: 'Allah Akbar! (God is great) For jihad!' Residents and Rashid's garrison fire broke out from the windows and rooftops, killing several British officers and soldiers; those who were not killed proceeded to retreat.

The British losses amounted to 185 dead, 282 wounded, and 120 captured at Rashid's garrison. Muhammad Ali arrived with his forces after the British withdrew to Alexandria. Muhammad Ali Pasha and General Fraser negotiated the withdrawal from Egypt and he left with the remaining British forces. 19 September, the date of the battle, became a national holiday in Beheira province.

== Battle of Al Hammad ==
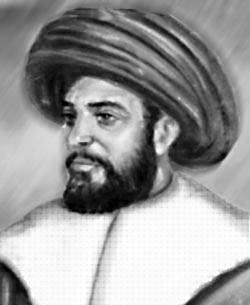
Omar Makram

The Battle of Al-Hammad, one of the battles of the Fraser Campaign, took place on 21 April 1807, between the British forces led by General Fraser and the Ottoman forces led by Muhammad Ali Pasha near the village of Al-Hammad in the lake. The British were unable to prevent the Ottoman cavalry from outflanking them.

The Battle of Rashid was a severe defeat for the British expedition. British casualties numbered 185 dead, 282 wounded, and 120 captives at Rashid's garrison. General Fraser, the campaign's leader, sought to erase the impact of his defeat in that battle. He planned to equip another army that resumed marching towards Rashid and pledged to lead it to General Stuart. Meanwhile, Muhammad Ali Pasha arrived in Cairo on the night of 12 April 1807 (3 Safar in 1222 AH) returning from Upper Egypt. He was briefed on the defeat of the British in Rashid, and was somewhat reassured, but did not rely on what happened in that battle. Muhammad Ali Pasha expected the British might resume their march to Rashid due to its poor defences. He mobilized an army to fight and prevent them from making any progress. His men completed fortifying their defence, that began with him before his arrived, and continued working by digging trenches between Bab Al-Hadid and Bulaq to establish a defence line from Cairo from the north. In preparing the defenses, he ordered his topps to cut grooves that were in front of the trenches connected to the Nile, filled those trenches with water to obstruct the progress of the British troops, and scuttled several boats between the island of Bulaq and the beach to prevent the passage of British ships in the Nile. He oversaw the installation of cannons in Shubra, Imbaba and the island of Bulaq. Local scholars and people participated in work with them.

Muhammad Ali Pasha managed to get the money needed for the army's expenses with help from Umar Makram and the local scholars. They collected nine hundred bags of gold from the capital's residents, which was then allocated for the army's advance. The campaign was prepared and consisted of 4,000 infantry fighters and 1,500 horsemen. It was led by Tabuziglu and marched to Rashid. General Stuart's army numbered about four thousand soldiers equipped with artillery, various types of firearms and ammunition. This army moved from Alexandria on 3 April and advanced toward Rashid. When the army approached, a battalion occupied Al-Hammad, located south of Rashid between the Nile and Lake Idku. The purpose of its occupation was to encircle Rashid, preventing the city's garrison from being reinforced with supplies from the south and securing local sources of water for the British. The British also captured Akam Abi Mandour, and installed cannons near the village to bombard Rashid. Most of the army was camped southwest of Rashid. On 7 April, the British army surrounded Rashid and bombarded it with artillery.

The British commanders assumed that a continued bombardment would cause a loss of morale among the city's garrison and compel them to surrender. The British dispatched a messenger to the city, informing them that if the demand of surrender was refused, a naval and land bombardment would commence. The Egyptians' prior victory at the Battle of Rashid had convinced them of the futility of a possible British bombardment, which commenced soon after the messenger's return to the British forces. The garrison occasionally left the city during the bombardment to skirmish with the British troops encamped on land. The bombardment lasted twelve days but could not achieve any results, and the city remained Egyptian.

The British were waiting for the Mamluks to find them. In the meantime, the villagers approached British positions in Al-Hammad. General Stuart dispatched several soldiers, and the Egyptians positioned artillery on the eastern shore and began bombarding the British army's positions on the western mainland. Two hundred and fifty British soldiers succeeded in capturing the Egyptian positions and the artillery. The Egyptians were then halted for some time, allowing MacDonald to return to the mainland.

The fighting and siege continued until the arrival Tabuzoglu forces, which substantially changed the war situation. Tabuzoglu's force comprised two divisions: the first was infantry personally led by Tabuzoglu on the eastern mainland of the Nile, and the other was cavalry led by Hassan Pasha on the western mainland. The two divisions moved along the road of the two beaches when they came close to Rashid. The forces of Hassan Pasha on the western mainland were facing Al-Hammad, and the other was encamped in Barnbal on the eastern beach. The soldiers of the two divisions were able to see each other.

On the morning of 20 April, the Egyptian army's advance guards from Hassan Pasha's cavalry division advanced towards the British positions in Al-Hammad. They encountered a battalion among the farms. The battalion attempted to retreat to the village, but their withdrawal was not controlled, and they were surrounded by the Egyptian Cavalry. Some were killed while others were captured. Upon learning of this initial collision, General Stuart sent Colonel Patrick Macleod, along with several soldiers and cannons, to Al-Hammad to establish forward positions fortified with artillery. He was entrusted with commanding the force stationed there.

The location of this village was of great importance, and the axis of fighting revolved around it because it is situated in the isthmus between the Nile and Lake Idku. To the north, there was a dry canal that reached from the Nile to near the lake. If the British had strengthened that defensive position, they could have blocked the road, preventing the Egyptian army from passing the isthmus and reaching Rashid to provide relief.

The colonels took positions to defend the isthmus. They had eight hundred fighters under the command of Major Wigsland. A force that was headed to Lake Idku was led by Captain Tarleton, and the base in the village of Al-Hammad was led by Major Moore. The majority of the British army were stationed around Rashid to besiege it.

20 April passed, and the Egyptian forces did not target the British site in Al-Hammad. Colonel Macleod was assured of his position. However, General Stuart inevitably noticed the impact of the defence line in Al-Hammad (the night of 21 April) and that it was not possible in some areas to pressure the Egyptian army if its numbers increased. He entrusted Colonel Macleod to defend his positions as much as possible. In the event of the proliferation of Egyptian cavalry forces, Macleod was to return to the original British positions around Rashid.

General Stuart realised that the Egyptian forces, after reaching them, outnumbered the British army. He decided to wait until the next day (21 April), and if Mamluk reinforcements did not reach him, he would withdraw from Al-Hammad, lift the siege on Rashid, and retreat to Alexandria.

The Egyptian army commander, Tabuzoglu, was stationed in Barnabal on the eastern mainland, hesitating over which path to take. Would he go straight to the rescue of Rashid to lift the siege, or would he first attack the British position in Al-Hammad? He was encouraged by the victory the Cavalry of Hassan Pasha achieved on the western mainland in the first collision, so he intended attack Al-Hammad. His force crossed the Nile at night and their boats transported them to the enemy's left flank, where they joined the Hassan Pasha contingent in preparation to attack Al-Hammad on the morning of 21 April.

In the morning, Colonel Macleod observed the increase of Egyptian army forces and that the plain was filled with men. He immediately sent General Stuart the news asking to withdraw to the British army's positions around Rashid. A platoon of soldiers were sent back with the approval but the messenge did not reach Al-Hammad as the Egyptian cavalry had descended on the plain and cut off transportation between Al-Hammad and Rashid. Macleod intended to withdraw from his defensive line, but did not finalize his plan, causing his forces to be dispersed. The Egyptian cavalry were able to pick off the British troops one by one, while their infantry moved to occupy Al-Hammad.

The Egyptian cavalry surrounded the British army's right flank, killing most of its men, including Colonel Macleod and its commander, Captain Tarleton. 50 men survived and were captured.

The British left flank offered little resistance and was also surrounded by cavalry. Its commander, Major Wigsland surrendered and his men followed, ending the battle. The battle started at seven in the morning, lasted three hours, and ended with a British defeat. The army stationed in Al-Hammad lost about 416 men and 400 were taken prisoners.

During the battle of Al-Hammad, General Stuart was stationed south of Rashid with the rest of the British army. When he realised the amount of losses in Al-Hammad, he quickly lifted the siege on Rashid and took the initiative to withdraw before the Egyptian army attacked him. He spiked the cannons that he could not carry and retreated to Abu Qir. Despite concealing the withdrawal measures, the people of Rashid and neighbouring towns harassed him until he reached Lake Idku. Skirmishes took place on the shore of the lake between him and the Egyptians, which ended in the skirmishers' retreat. Despite this, the British continued to withdraw until they reached Abu Qir. From there, they boarded waiting Royal Navy ships and sailed back to Alexandria.

== Siege of Alexandria ==
The defeat at Rosetta compelled Mackenzie-Fraser to reassess his position. British troops were instructed to reoccupy Alexandria, which was promptly besieged by Egyptian and Mamluk forces from Cairo. Using his feigned goodwill as a pretext, Muhammad Ali offered the British the liberty to receive supplies from Duckworth's transports, as well as a grain trade agreement with added assurances of security for any trade routes to India. This was in exchange for recognition of his independence from the Ottoman Empire. The grain agreement was accepted, and supplies continued to be delivered to the British troops in Alexandria. However, the British government did not formally recognise independence, as it had no intention of seeing the Ottoman Empire dismantled in the face of an expansionist Russia.

== Departure from Alexandria ==
In September, when no further use could be derived from the occupation of Alexandria, General Mackenzie-Fraser was allowed to surrender the city and retreat to Sicily on the 25th.

== Expedition Order of Battle ==
Royal Navy
HMS Royal George (100 guns) Vice-Admiral Duckworth (flag), Captain Richard Dalling Dunn
HMS Canopus (80 guns)
HMS Repulse (74 guns)
HMS Pompee (74 guns)
HMS Thunderer (74 guns)
HMS Tigre (74 guns) Captain Benjamin Hallowell (Note: Hollowell was the naval commander of the expedition.) HMS Apollo (38 guns) Captain Fellowes
HMS Wizard brig-sloop (16 guns) Captain Palmer
33 transports

British Army
detachment, Royal Staff Corps
detachment, Royal Artillery
detachment, Royal Engineers Sir John Burgoyne
3rd Squadron, 20th Light Dragoons
31st Regiment of Foot
1st Battalion, 35th Regiment of Foot
2nd Battalion, 35th Regiment of Foot
2nd Battalion, 78th Regiment of Foot
Roll's Regiment
Chasseurs Britanniques
Sicilian Regiment
Adjutant General's Department
Commissariat
Hospital Staff
Pay Master General's Department
Quarter Master General's Department

== See also ==
- Muhammad Ali's seizure of power
