= Flora (ship) =

Several vessels have been named Flora:

- Flora (1798 ship) was built at Yarmouth. She was captured early in her career and quickly recaptured. She traded to the Mediterranean and the Bahamas. She was last listed in 1813.
- Flora (1801 ship) was built in India. She first appeared in British records in 1801 as a West Indiaman. She was last listed in Lloyd's Register (LR) in 1808.
- Flora (1813 ship) was launched at Narsipore.
- Flora (1814 ship) was a brig of 186 tons (bm) that the Bombay Dockyard built for the Bengal Pilot Service. She was sold in 1836 to become a local merchantman.

== See also ==
- French ship Flore, any one of eight ships of the French Navy
- HMS Flora, any one of several British warships
- HM Hired armed cutter Flora
- Lady Flora was launched at Calcutta. She spent her entire career as an East Indiaman but made only one voyage for the British East India Company (EIC). She was last listed in 1855.
