= Dick (ship) =

Several vessels have been named Dick:

- Dick (1788 ship) was a merchant ship built in 1788 in Rotherhithe, on the River Thames, England. She initially sailed as a West Indiaman. Her role and whereabouts between 1796 and 1810 are obscure. Later, she made two voyages as a troop transport, one to Ceylon and one to New South Wales. She then made one voyage transporting convicts to New South Wales. She was last listed in 1822.
- Dick (1798 ship) was a French vessel built in Spain, that the British captured circa 1798; she was almost certainly sailing under another name. Dick made a voyage to the West Indies during which she repelled two attacks, and captured three prizes. She then became a slave ship that made three slave-trading voyages. Her first voyage was cut short when a French privateer captured her and the Royal Navy recaptured her. She then made two compete voyages. After her return in 1803 from her third voyage she became a West Indiaman. She grounded in 1804 after being run foul off. She was last listed in 1809.

== See also ==
- Old Dick (1789 ship) was launched at Bermuda in 1789. She sailed to England and was lengthened n 1792. From 1792 on she made two full voyages as a Liverpool-based slave ship. On her second she recaptured two British merchant ships. She was lost in 1796 at Jamaica after having landed her third cargo of slaves.
