= List of torpedo boats of France =

The French Navy (Marine nationale) has operated torpedo boats through the late 19th century and into the early Cold War. Early torpedo boats, assigned numbers in lieu of names, were intended for coastal defense. Larger torpedo boats were intended for operations in the open ocean, with some captured from an enemy or ordered on a one-off basis to test new designs.

== Pre-war through World War I ==
Balny-class torpedo boat:

- Balny
- Déroulède
- Doudart de la Grée
- Edmond Fontaine
- Bouët-Willaumez
- Dehorter
- Capitaine Cuny
- Capitaine Mehl
- Challier

Ouragan-class torpedo boat:

- Ouragan
- Alarme
- Téméraire
- Aventurier
- Défi

Coureur-class torpedo boat:

- Coureur
- Véloce
- Grondeur

Avant-Garde-class torpedo boat:

- Avant-Garde
- Archer
- Turco
- Zouave
- Dragon
- Grenadier
- Lancier

Agile-class torpedo boat:

- Agile
- Audacieux
- Éclair
- Kabyle
- Orage
- Sarrazin
- Tourbillon

Corsaire (single ship)

Mousquetaire (single ship)

Lansquenet (single ship)

Averne-class torpedo boat:

- Averne
- Dauphin

Argonaute-class torpedo boat:

- Argonaute
- Tourmente

Filibustier-class torpedo boat:

- Filibustier
- Ariel
- Aquilon

Forban (single ship)

Mangini (single ship)

Libellule (single ship)

=== Numerical torpedo boats ===
No. 1 (single ship)

No. 2 (single ship)

No. 3 (single ship)

No. 4 (single ship)

No 5-class:

- No. 5
- No. 6

No. 7 (single ship)

No. 8-class:

- No. 8
- No. 9
- No. 10
- No. 11
- No. 12
- No. 13
- No. 14
- No. 15
- No. 16
- No. 17
- No. 18
- No. 19

27-metre type torpedo boat:

- Norman subvariant:
- No. 20
- No. 21
- No. 41
- No. 42
- No. 47
- No. 48
- No. 49
- No. 54
- No. 55
- Claparède subvariant:
- No. 22
- No. 23
- No. 37
- No. 38
- No. 39
- No. 40
- No. 51
- No. 52
- No. 53
- La Seyne subvariant:
- No. 24
- No. 25
- No. 33
- No. 34
- No. 35
- No. 36
- No. 43
- No. 44
- No. 45
- No. 46
- No. 50

Torpilleurs-vedettes:

- Thornycroft variant:
- No. 29
- No. 30
- No. 56
- No. 57
- No. 58
- No. 59
- Yarrow subvariant:
- No. 31
- No. 32
- Schnider subvariant:
- A
- B
- D
- E
- F
- G
- H
- I

C (single ship)

No. 26 (single ship)

No. 27 (single ship)

No. 28 (single ship)

33-metre type torpedo boat:

- No. 60
- No. 61
- No. 62
- No. 63
- No. 64
- No. 65
- No. 66
- No. 67
- No. 68
- No. 69
- No. 70
- No. 71
- No. 72
- No. 73
- No. 74

35-metre type torpedo boat:

- No. 75
- No. 76
- No. 77
- No. 78
- No. 79
- No. 80
- No. 81
- No. 82
- No. 83
- No. 84
- No. 85
- No. 86
- No. 87
- No. 88
- No. 89
- No. 90
- No. 91
- No. 92
- No. 93
- No. 94
- No. 95
- No. 96
- No. 97
- No. 98
- No. 99
- No. 100
- No. 101
- No. 102
- No. 103
- No. 104
- No. 105
- No. 106
- No. 107
- No. 108
- No. 109
- No. 110
- No. 111
- No. 112
- No. 113
- No. 114
- No. 115
- No. 116
- No. 117
- No. 118
- No. 119
- No. 120
- No. 121
- No. 122
- No. 123
- No. 124
- No. 125

No. 126-class:

- No. 126
- No. 127
- No. 128
- No. 129

34-metre type torpedo boat:

- No. 130
- No. 131
- No. 132
- No. 133
- No. 134
- No. 135
- No. 136
- No. 137
- No. 138
- No. 139
- No. 140
- No. 141
- No. 142
- No. 143
- No. 144

Modified '126' type torpedo boat:

- No. 145
- No. 146
- No. 147
- No. 148
- No. 149
- No. 152
- No. 153
- No. 154
- No. 155
- No. 156
- No. 157
- No. 158
- No. 159
- No. 160
- No. 161
- No. 162
- No. 163
- No. 164
- No. 165
- No. 166
- No. 167
- No. 168
- No. 169
- No. 170
- No. 171
- Longer variant:
- No. 172
- No. 173
- No. 174
- No. 175
- No. 176
- No. 177
- No. 178
- No. 179
- No. 180
- No. 181
- No. 182
- No. 183
- No. 184
- No. 185
- No. 186
- No. 187
- No. 188
- No. 189
- No. 190
- No. 191
- No. 192
- No. 193
- No. 194
- No. 195
- No. 196
- No. 197
- No. 198
- No. 199
- No. 200

37-metre type torpedo boat:

- No. 201
- No. 202
- No. 203
- No. 204
- No. 205
- No. 206
- No. 207
- No. 208
- No. 209
- No. 210
- No. 211
- No. 212
- No. 213
- No. 214
- No. 215
- No. 216
- No. 217
- No. 218
- No. 219
- No. 220
- No. 221
- No. 222
- No. 223
- No. 224
- No. 225
- No. 226
- No. 227
- No. 228
- No. 229
- No. 230
- No. 231
- No. 232
- No. 233
- No. 234
- No. 235
- No. 236
- No. 237
- No. 238
- No. 239
- No. 240
- No. 241
- No. 242
- No. 243
- No. 244
- No. 245
- No. 246
- No. 247
- No. 248
- No. 249
- No. 250
- No. 251
- No. 252
- No. 253
- No. 254
- No. 255
- No. 256
- No. 257
- No. 258
- No. 259
- No. 260
- No. 261
- No. 262
- No. 263
- No. 264
- No. 265
- No. 266
- No. 267
- No. 268
- No. 269
- No. 270
- No. 271
- No. 272
- No. 273
- No. 274
- No. 275
- No. 276
- No. 277
- No. 278
- No. 279
- No. 280
- No. 281
- No. 282
- No. 283
- No. 284
- No. 285
- No. 286
- No. 287
- No. 288
- No. 289
- No. 290
- No. 291
- No. 292

No. 293 (single ship)

No. 294 (single ship)

38-metre type torpedo boat:

- No. 295
- No. 296
- No. 297
- No. 298
- No. 299
- No. 300
- No. 301
- No. 302
- No. 303
- No. 304
- No. 305
- No. 306
- No. 307
- No. 308
- No. 309
- No. 310
- No. 311
- No. 312
- No. 313
- No. 314
- No. 315
- No. 316
- No. 317
- No. 318
- No. 319
- No. 320
- No. 321
- No. 322
- No. 323
- No. 324
- No. 325
- No. 326
- No. 327
- No. 328
- No. 329
- No. 330
- No. 331
- No. 332
- No. 333
- No. 334
- No. 335
- No. 336
- No. 337
- No. 338
- No. 339
- No. 340
- No. 341
- No. 342
- No. 343
- No. 344
- No. 345
- No. 346
- No. 347
- No. 348
- No. 349
- No. 350
- No. 351
- No. 352
- No. 353
- No. 354
- No. 355
- No. 356
- No. 357
- No. 358
- No. 359
- No. 360
- No. 361
- No. 362
- No. 363
- No. 364
- No. 365
- No. 366
- No. 367
- No. 368
- No. 369

== World War II through Cold War ==
La Melpomène-class torpedo boat:

- La Melpomène
- La Pomone
- La Flore
- L'Iphigénie
- La Bayonnaise
- Bombarde
- L'Incomprise
- La Poursuivante
- La Cordelière
- Baliste
- Branlebas
- Bouclier

Le Fier-class torpedo boat:

- Le Fier
- L'Agile
- L'Entreprenant
- Le Farouche
- L'Alsacien
- Le Corse
- Le Breton
- Le Tunisien
- Le Normand
- Le Parisien
- Le Provençal
- Le Saintongeais
- Le Niçois
- Le Savoyard

Type 35 torpedo boat:

- Birhackeim

Type 37 torpedo boat:

- Baccarat

Type 39 torpedo boat:

- L'Alsacien
- Le Lorrain

== Bibliography ==
- Campbell, N. J. M. (1979). "France". In Gardiner, Robert (ed.). Conway's All the World's Fighting Ships 1860–1905. London: Conway Maritime Press. pp. 283–333. ISBN 978-0-85177-133-5.
- Smigielski, Adam (1985). "France". In Gray, Randal (ed.). Conway's All the World's Fighting Ships 1906–1921. Annapolis, Maryland: Naval Institute Press. pp. 190–220. ISBN 0-85177-245-5.
- Roberts, John (1980). "France". In Gardiner, Robert & Chesneau, Roger (eds.). Conway's All the World's Fighting Ships 1922–1946. Annapolis: Naval Institute Press. pp. 255–279. ISBN 978-0-85177-146-5.
- Roberts, Stephen S. (2021). French Warships in the Age of Steam 1859–1914. Pen & Sword Books. ISBN 1526745364.
