= Charles Cunningham =

Royal Navy rear-admiral (1755–1834)

Rear-Admiral Sir Charles Cunningham KCH
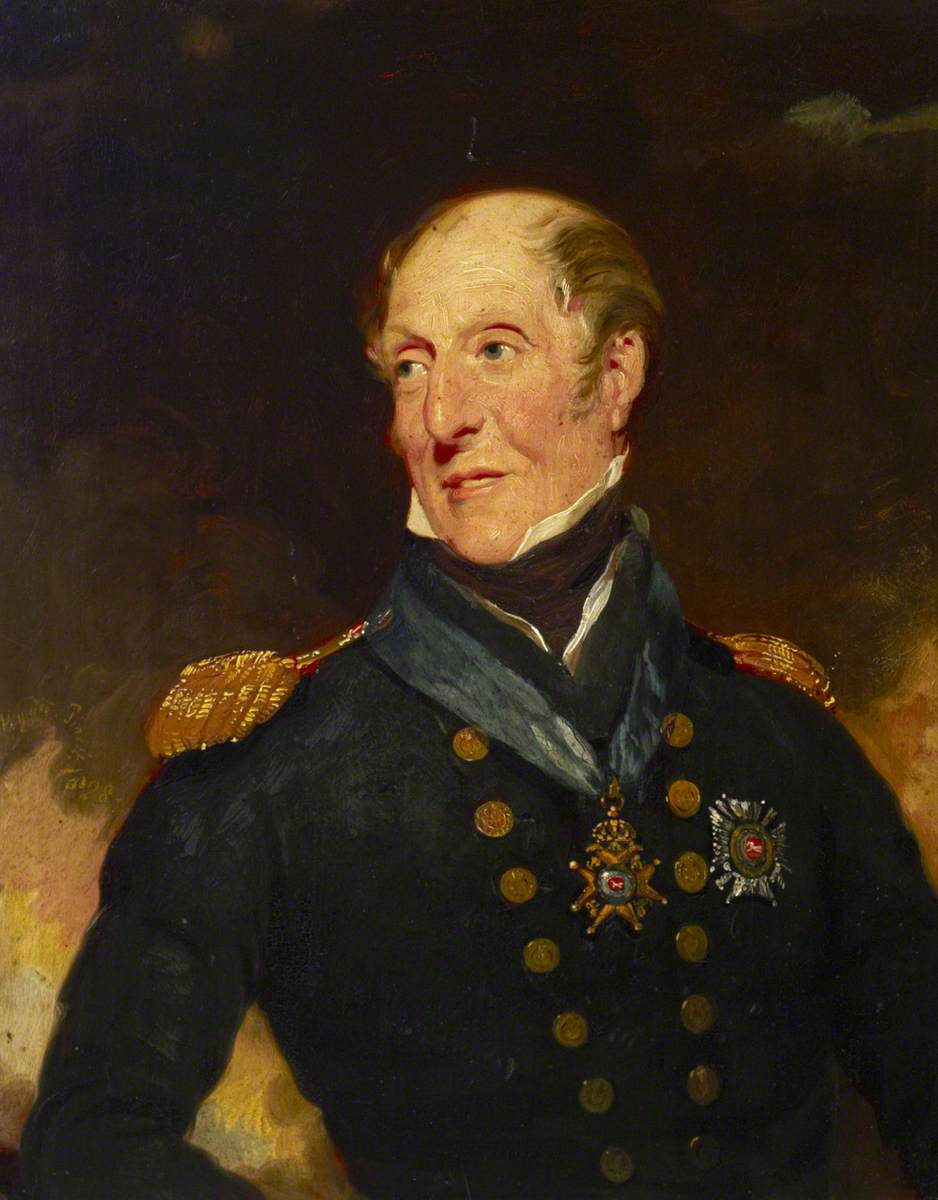
- Portrait by Henry Wyatt
- Born: 1755; Eye, Suffolk
- Died: March 11, 1834 (aged 78–79); Eye, Suffolk
- Military career
- Allegiance: United Kingdom of Great Britain and Ireland
- Branch: Royal Navy
- Service years: 1775–1834
- Rank: Rear-Admiral
- Commands: HMS Ariel; HMS Speedy; HMS Imperieuse; HMS Clyde; HMS Princess of Orange; HMS Leopard
- Awards: Knight Commander of the Royal Guelphic Order

Rear-Admiral Sir Charles Cunningham KCH (1755 – 11 March 1834) was an officer of the Royal Navy during the late eighteenth and early nineteenth century. He saw action during the American War of Independence and the French Revolutionary and Napoleonic Wars, eventually rising to the rank of rear-admiral.

== Early life ==
Son of Charles and Elizabeth Cunningham, Charles Cunningham was born in Eye, Suffolk in 1755, and after reading Robinson Crusoe at a young age, decided on a career at sea. As the country was at peace he joined a merchant ship. While serving as a seaman, the American War of Independence broke out and Cunningham joined the Royal Navy as a midshipman in 1775. He initially served aboard the 32-gun frigate HMS Aeolus, which sailed to the West Indies in early 1776, joining Sir Peter Parker's fleet. Cunningham's abilities led to him being recommended to Parker, and Parker duly transferred him aboard his flagship, HMS Bristol. He was transferred again to the 14-gun HMS Ostrich, which was despatched to cruise off Savannah Point, Jamaica.

On 8 July the Ostrich engaged a 16-gun French privateer. In the ensuing three-hour battle, both the commander and the lieutenant of the Ostrich were wounded but the French were forced to surrender, having lost 30 dead. The British casualties were four dead and 28 wounded. After his good conduct in the battle, Cunningham was appointed Acting-Lieutenant aboard the 18-gun sloop HMS Port Royal the following year. He then moved to the 28-gun sixth rate HMS Hinchinbrook as her First Lieutenant. The Hinchinbrook was then under the command of Horatio Nelson. Cunningham remained at sea after Nelson transferred to the shore to superintend the defences of Jamaica, transferring to the 36-gun HMS Pallas in 1780. The Pallas was ordered to escort the fleet from Jamaica back to Britain in summer 1782. During the crossing the squadron encountered a hurricane. Several of the ships were sunk and the Pallas was driven onto shore and wrecked. Fortunately Cunningham had transferred from her just before she sailed, joining HMS Ajax. He remained in the West Indies until receiving confirmation of his promotion on 4 September, and the command of the hired brig Barrington.

== Command ==
Cunningham was then sent with HMS Racehorse by Sir Joshua Rowley to interdict the American salt trade with the Bahamas. He was successful at this, but whilst re-provisioning at Jamaica, a French force landed and seized Turks Island. Alerted to this, Nelson gathered together a small squadron and set off to attempt to recapture it, relying on Cunningham's expert knowledge of the waters around the island. Nelson's force fell in with Cunningham's Barrington off the island, and together the Barrington and another of Nelson's ships, HMS Drake began to bombard the French positions whilst troops were landed. The two ships came under heavy fire from the entrenched French and were compelled to withdraw, having had several wounded. Nelson tried again the following day, but again failed to make much headway, and the attempt was called off.

The end of the war in 1783 meant that the Barrington was paid off and Cunningham retired from active naval life. He returned to service in 1788 when he joined Admiral Sir William Cornwallis' flagship HMS Crown. He served for several years in the East Indies, before being promoted to commander and given command of the 16-gun sloop HMS Ariel. He then returned to Britain. He arrived after the outbreak of war with France, and was quickly appointed to the 14-gun HMS Speedy. He then joined Lord Hood's fleet in the Mediterranean, arriving there in April 1793. He was largely employed in carrying despatches and maintaining communications with other ships scattered throughout the Mediterranean ports. On 5 October 1793 the Speedy accompanied HMS Bedford and HMS Captain into Genoa, where they captured a French frigate, the Modeste and two armed tartanes. The Captain and Speedy then sailed to the Gulf of Spezia where they caught another French frigate, the Imperieuse at anchor. The Imperieuse scuttled herself, but was subsequently salvaged and recommissioned as HMS Imperieuse. Cunningham was promoted to captain and given command of the prize, with his commission post-dated to the date of the capture, 12 October 1793.

He commanded the Imperieuse until early 1794, when he transferred to HMS Lowestoffe. He commanded her off Corsica, helping his old commander Nelson in the reduction of the French strongholds on the island. Cunningham distinguished himself to the extent that Lord Hood entrusted him with the public despatches announcing the capture of the island, adding

Captain Cunningham, who has cruised with infinite diligence, zeal, and perseverance, under many difficulties, for three months past, off Calvi, is charged with my despatches, and is competent to give any information that their Lordships may wish to have. I beg to recommend him as an officer of great merit, and highly deserving any favour that can be shown him.

Cunningham was given command of HMS Clyde, a 38-gun frigate he was to command for the next six years. He was at anchor with the fleet at the Nore when the Spithead and Nore mutinies broke out in 1797.

== Actions during the mutiny ==
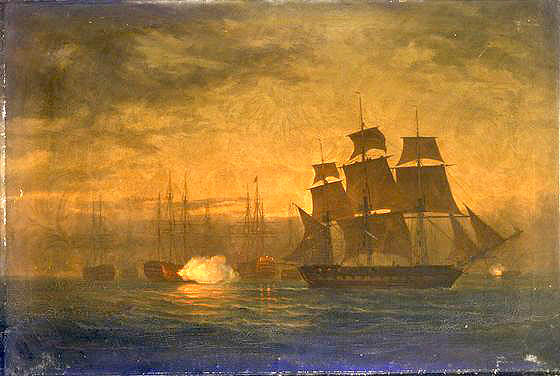
Escape of HMS 'Clyde' from the Nore mutiny, 30 May 1797 , by William Joy. The Clyde slips away at night, with the ships of the mutineers in the background. The red flag flies from the mainmast of the Sandwich, to the left of the picture.

The Spithead and Nore mutinies were two major mutinies by sailors of the Royal Navy on various adjacent ships that broke out on 10 May 1797 and quickly spread. During the mutiny, only Cunningham aboard the Clyde and Sir Harry Burrard-Neale aboard HMS St Fiorenzo were able to retain control over the sailors on their respective ships. By 22 May, the mutiny became more violent due to the Admiralty refusing to make any concessions. To help signal their mutinous control over the port admiral, the flag of the port admiral was torn down and replaced with the red flag. Seven days later on 29 May, the mutineer leader Richard Parker called for delegates to come from other ships to his headquarters aboard HMS Sandwich. Sensing the time was right to escape, Cunningham did not reply to Parker's request. To keep the mutineers from suspecting his plan, Cunningham kept the sails of the Clyde down and did not man the ship's wheel with a pilot.

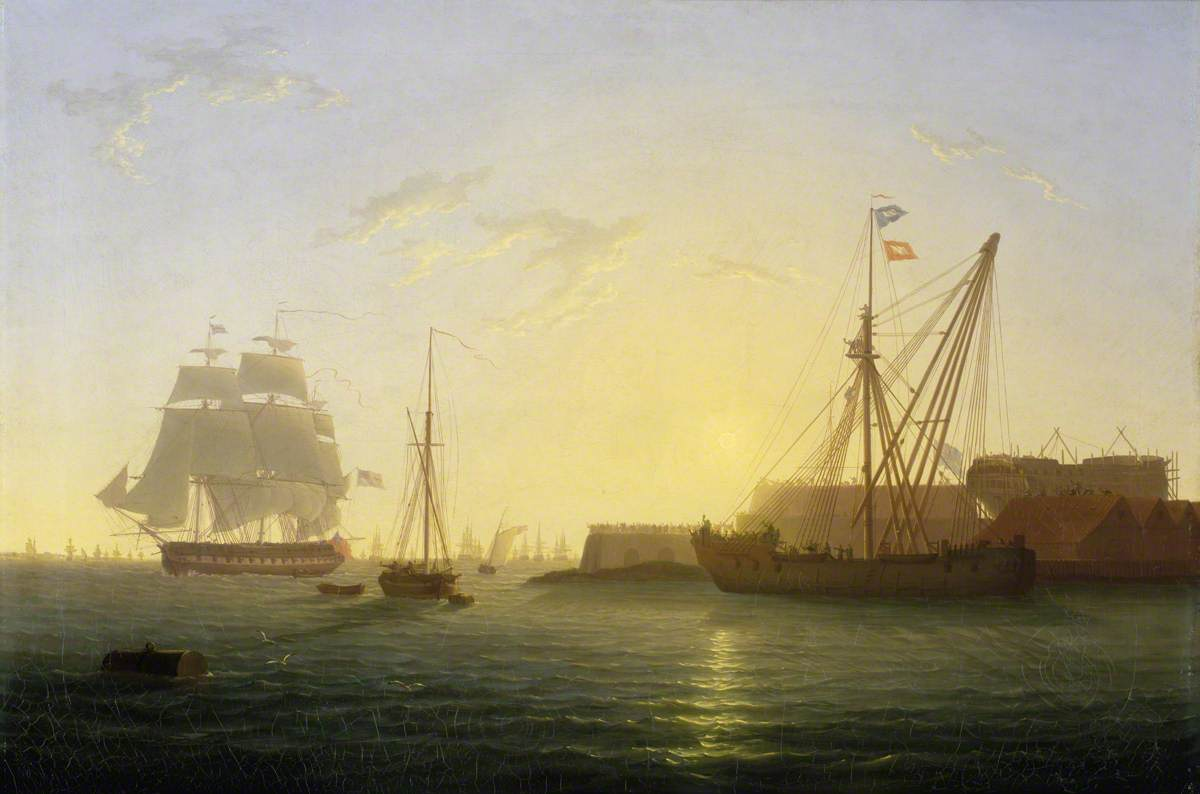
HMS 'Clyde' Arriving at Sheerness After the 'Nore' Mutiny, 30 May 1797, Joy's second painting, showing the Clyde arriving the following morning to cheering crowds.

After it grew sufficiently dark, Cunningham gathered his crew at 9pm and announced his intention to escape the mutiny by sailing the Clyde out of the port in the next three hours so that they would arrive at Sheerness before daybreak. He encouraged them by declaring that if they agreed to this, Sir Harry Neale would join them with the St Fiorenzo. The crew almost unanimously agreed to this, and a single voice of dissent was quickly shouted down. At midnight, Cunningham ordered the anchor raised and the Clyde silently slipped out of the port. By daybreak, Cunningham and his ship arrived at Sheerness safely away from the mutiny. The Clyde's successful escape from the mutineers cause an atmosphere of distrust to spread among those who agreed to follow the mutineer leaders. This distrust formed the first effective blow against the ringleaders, and soon other ships were abandoning the mutinies and returning control to their respective commanders. As a result, the mutinies soon were quashed.

== Return to service ==
The Clyde's next duty was to escort a convoy to the Baltic. While returning from this duty the Clyde came across and captured the French privateer Success, and several days later captured the Dorade. Several men were put aboard the prize from the Clyde, but while returning to port, a gale blew up. The prize had attempted to outsail the Clyde but capsized. Cunningham stopped and lowered a boat to assist, but only four survivors were recovered. In 1798 the Clyde was used to attend on King George III during his trip to Weymouth, after which she returned to cruising in the English Channel. On 10 June 1799 she captured the French privateer schooner Air, following this up three days later by capturing the privateer Bon Ordre.

On 20 August, while sailing off Cordovan, two sails were spotted in the distance. Thinking them to be a ship of the line and a frigate, Cunningham sailed closer, at which the two ships began to sail away in opposite directions. Cunningham immediately gave chase, pursuing the largest one, which turned out to be the 36-gun frigate Vestale. The Clyde brought her to battle and after an engagement of an hour forced her to strike her colours. The Vestale had lost 10 killed and 22 wounded to two killed and three wounded on the Clyde. In the meantime the other French ship, the 28-gun Sagasse had taken the opportunity to escape into port. News of the victory was communicated to shore. King George III was in the theatre when news reached him. He stood up and directed the news be communicated to the audience. There was applause and Rule Britannia! was played.

The Clyde then joined Sir John Jervis and Admiral Cornwallis. She was occupied throughout the summer of 1800 conveying the artist John Thomas Serres around the French coast so that he could carry out surveys and make sketches of the headlands for charts. Cunningham was also active in capturing several Spanish privateers, and pursuing French warships.

In summer 1801 Cunningham was appointed Commodore, and given command of a squadron of frigates to guard against a possible French invasion of the Channel Islands. On 21 July HMS Jason was wrecked on the French coast. Learning that the French intended to salvage and re-float the vessel, Cunningham sent the Clyde's lieutenant, William Mounsey in with the ship's boats to burn the wreck. In this Mounsey was successful, despite being under heavy fire from French shore batteries as he did so.

== Promotions and flag rank ==
With the Peace of Amiens the Clyde was paid off at the Nore on 24 June 1802. The resumption of hostilities led to Cunningham being given command of the 74-gun HMS Princess of Orange and sent to patrol off the Texel with a squadron. He was relieved in this post by Sir Sidney Smith, and Cunningham moved aboard HMS Leopard. In September 1803 he was offered a place on the Victualling Board by Earl St Vincent, and moved ashore. In 1806 he became resident commissioner of Deptford and Woolwich Dockyards, which he superintended for the next seventeen years. He moved to Chatham Dockyard in 1823, and he retired from there on 4 May 1829 with the rank of Rear-Admiral. He was made a Knight Commander of the Royal Guelphic Order on 24 October 1832. In 1829 he had published his account of the events at the Nore, entitled A narrative of occurrences that took place during the mutiny at the Nore in the months of May and June 1797.

== Family and later years ==
Cunningham had married twice, first to Miss Boycott, and secondly to Miss Proby. He had a number of children. His son joined the navy but died at sea in 1822. Cunningham spent the later years of his life living with his daughters at the family seat of Oak Lawn House in Eye. He died there at the age of 80 on 11 March 1834.
