= HMS Flora =

Five ships of the Royal Navy have borne the name HMS Flora:

- HMS Flora was a sloop ordered in 1755 but later cancelled.
- HMS Flora was a 32-gun fifth rate, previously the French ship Vestale. HMS Unicorn captured her in 1761 but the Royal Navy scuttled her in 1778 to avoid capture. The Americans salvaged her and she became a letter of marque. The Americans sold her to the French and she became the French privateer Flore in 1784. She was then recaptured by HMS Phaeton in 1798 and sold.
- HMS Flora (1780) was a 36-gun fifth rate launched in 1780 and wrecked in 1808. Because Flora served in the navy's Egyptian campaign between 8 March 1801 and 2 September, her officers and crew qualified for the clasp "Egypt" to the Naval General Service Medal, which the Admiralty issued in 1847 to all surviving claimants.
- HMS Flora (1844) was a 44-gun fifth rate launched in 1844. She was on harbour service from 1851 and was sold in 1891.
- HMS Flora (1893) was an Astraea-class cruiser launched in 1893. She was renamed TS Indus II in 1915 and was sold in 1922.
- HMS Flora was originally the Ant-class iron screw gunboat HMS Griper. Griper was used for harbour service from 1905 and was renamed YC373. She was then renamed HMS Flora when she became a base ship in 1923. She was renamed HMS Afrikander in 1933 and was sold in 1937.

== See also ==
- HM Hired armed cutter Flora
