= French submarine Flore =

1960 Daphné-class submarine

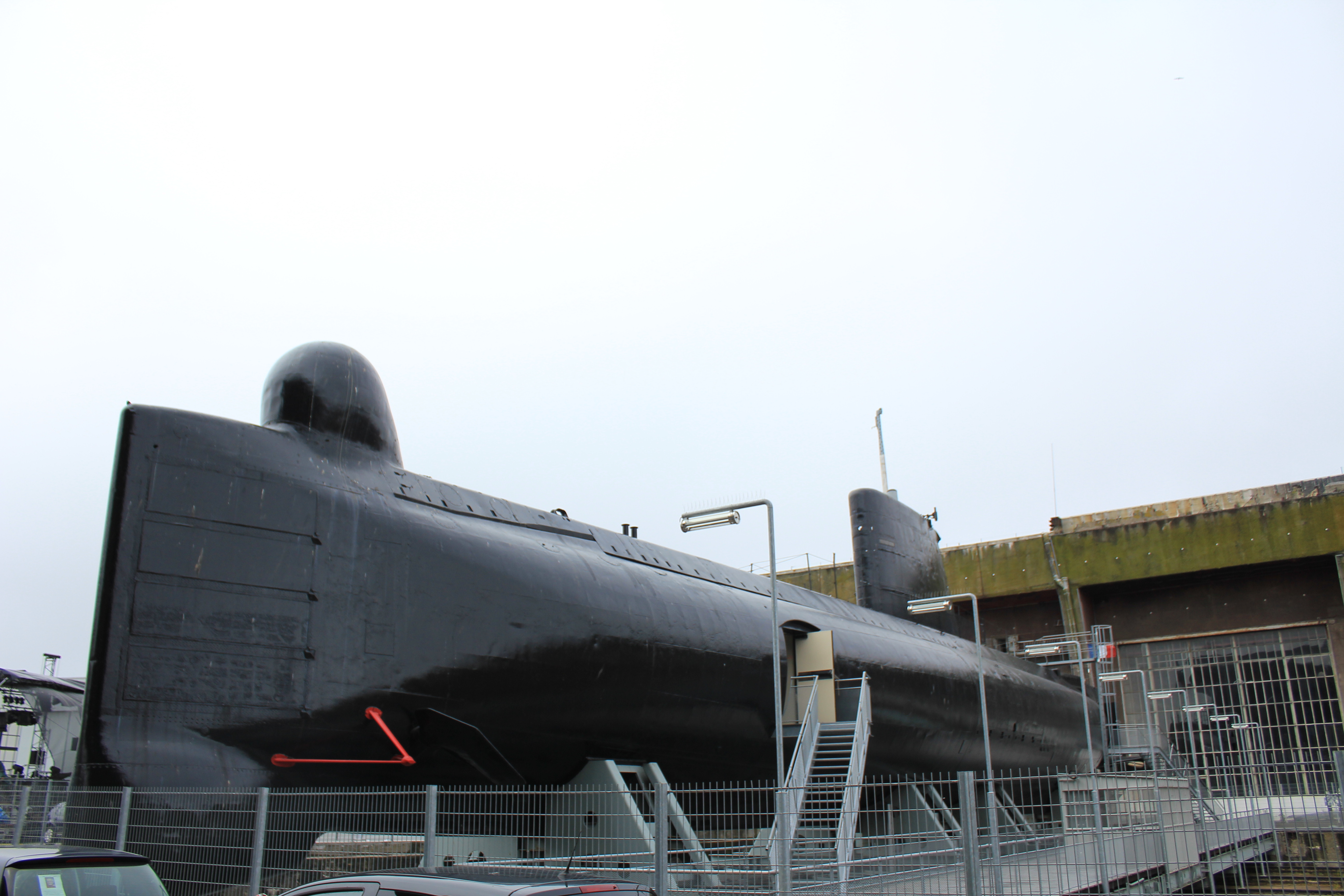
- Flore as a museum ship at Lorient Submarine Base

History

France
- Name: Flore
- Builder: Direction des Constructions et Armes navales, Cherbourg
- Laid down: 19 June 1958
- Launched: 21 December 1960
- Commissioned: 21 May 1964
- Decommissioned: 29 March 1989
- Status: Museum ship

General characteristics
- Class & type: Daphné-class submarine
- Displacement: 870 t (860 long tons) surfaced; 1,043 t (1,027 long tons) dived
- Length: 57.75 m (189 ft 6 in)
- Beam: 6.74 m (22 ft 1 in)
- Draft: 5.25 m (17 ft 3 in)
- Propulsion: 2 generators of 450 kW SEMT Pielstick type 12PA1 or 12PA4; 2 electric motors 1,000 hp; 2 propellers
- Speed: 12 knots (22 km/h; 14 mph) surfaced; 15 knots (28 km/h; 17 mph) dived
- Range: 4,300 nmi (8,000 km; 4,900 mi) at 7.5 kn (13.9 km/h; 8.6 mph) while snorkelling
- Test depth: 300 m (980 ft)
- Complement: 56
- Sensors & processing systems: Radar DRUA 31; Sonar DUUA; 2B Sonar DUUA1; Passive sonar DSUV 2; Acoustic rangefinder DUUX
- Armament: 12 torpedo tubes for 550 mm (22 in) torpedoes (8 at the bow, 4 at the stern)

Flore (S 645) was a Daphné-class submarine of the French Navy. Launched in 1960, it was in service from 1964 to 1989, primarily operating in the Mediterranean Sea. Since 2010, Flore has been used as a museum ship at the Lorient Submarine Base.

== History ==
=== Construction ===
The submarine was christened Flore on 17 April 1956. It was placed under construction at the Direction des Constructions et Armes navales (DCAN) of Cherbourg on 19 June 1958. It was the fifth vessel constructed of its class. Flore was launched on 21 December 1960, and was placed on water on 22 September 1961

=== Tests ===
On 15 November 1961 it was decided that its marines would wear the fourragere of colours of the ribbon of the cross of war with olive 1939–1945. This inherits the tradition of the torpedo boat of the same name. The submarine had a mascot from 1961 to 1963: a dog named Annie.

On 23 January 1962, Flore exercised its first static dive in a transatlantic dock in Cherbourg. It underwent its endurance cruise from 28 July to 25 August 1962, probably between Cherbourg and Toulon via Funchal, Madeira and Málaga, Spain, under the command Lieutenant Barbier. In November 1962, the docked at Genoa, Italy.

On 26 July 1963, the vessel docked at Alicante, Spain, in company of the submarines Amazone, Minerve and Galatée, as well as the squadron escort, Maillé-Brézé. From October 1963 to November 1963, a test of an automatic immersion system was held at Toulon to aid the future ballistic missile submarines of the Redoutable class. In February 1964, the vessel visited Genoa again with Astrée.

=== Active service ===
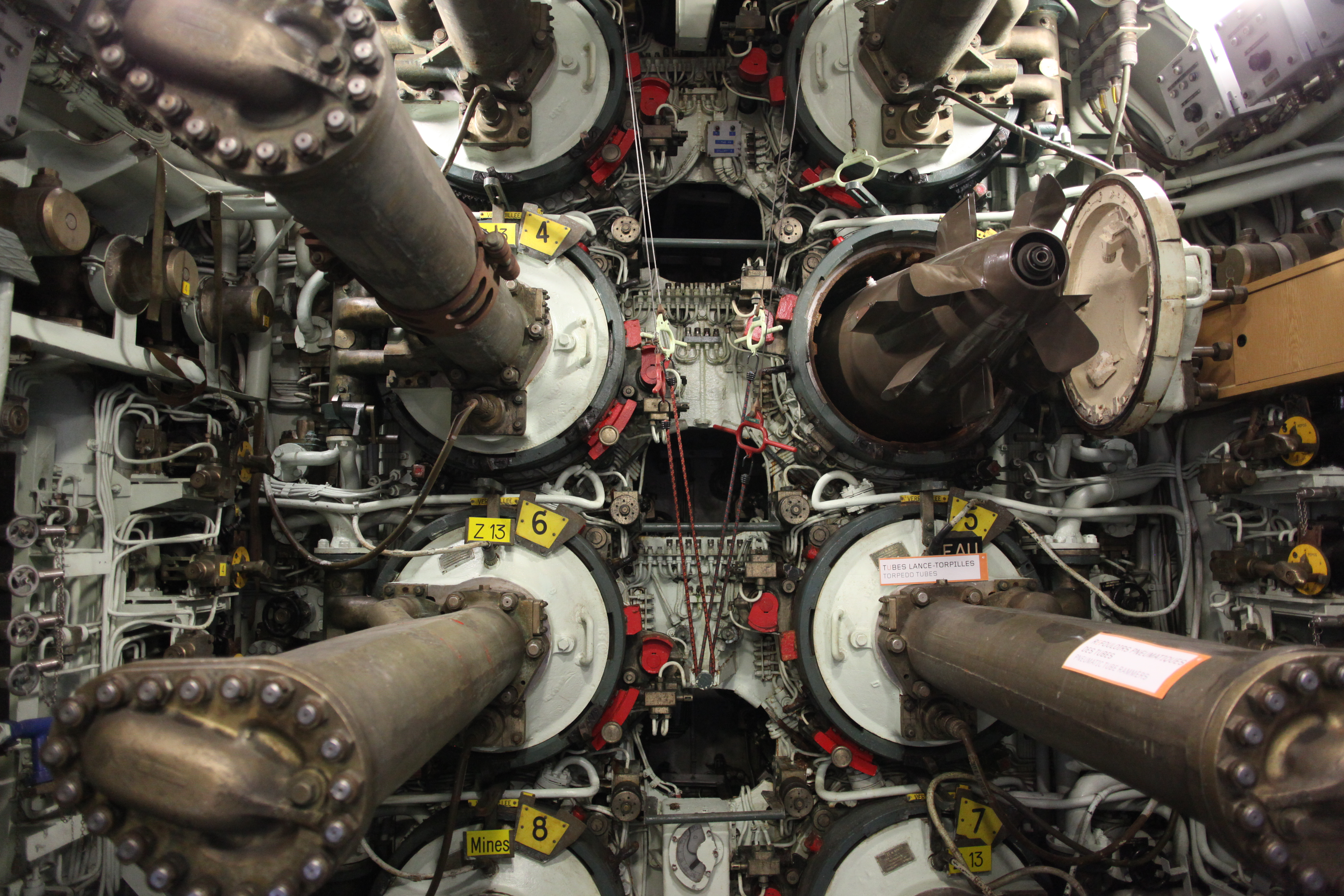
Inner bow torpedo tubes of Flore

Flore was commissioned on 21 May 1964 and was assigned to the 1st submarine squadron at Toulon, its base port. Most of its career took place in the Mediterranean. The vessel periodically went back to Lorient for refitting.

From 16 April 1965 to 29 April 1966, the submarine underwent refitting at Lorient and was temporarily assigned to the 2nd submarine squadron. It subsequently returned to Toulon. In January 1968, the submarine experienced its first incident which resulted in the sinking of the fairing of the passive sonar bulb on the bow. From 28 May 1969 to 1 April 1970, it underwent major refit at Toulon. In February 1970, the ship was integrated into the Mediterranean submarine squadron when it was created in Toulon.

On 19 February 1971, the submarine suffered a leak off the coast of Toulon whilst it was at periscopic depth, following the malfunction of the air installation. The engine was damaged (compartment flooded) and the submarine was forced to release its ballast to return to the surface. The vessel was recovered shortly after by the tugs Pachyderme and Travailleur to be taken to Toulon, where it was repaired.

In 1974, Flore underwent major refit in Toulon and new equipment was installed (new sonars, improved detection installations). On 1 December 1975, General Bigeard, then Secretary of State for Defence, carried out a dive aboard Flore. On this occasion, General Bigeard drank a bowl of seawater in order to comply with the tradition of baptism as a submariner during the first dive.

On 7 September 1978, Flore left Toulon for Cherbourg where he arrived on 20 of September. The submarine entered into a major refit (1 November 1978 to October 1979), then left Cherbourg on 3 October 1979. Flore returned to Toulon on 28 October 1979. On 21 October 1986, the fast escort L'Alsacien was sunk in the Mediterranean by Flore.

Flore was placed in normal reserve in 1988. On 3 March 1989, it made its last dive in the Mediterranean, then reached Lorient on 29 March 1989, the date on which it was withdrawn from active service. The last raising of the colors took place in Lorient on 19 May 1989 On 29 November 1994, it was placed in special reserve and was still ventilated to allow for its conservation. Flore traveled 320,000 nautical miles (590,000 km; 370,000 mi), or nearly 15 times around the Earth. It spent 41,000 hours dived.

=== Naval museum ===
On 12 July 1995, Flore was put on dry land on the slipway of the Lorient submarine base. The submarine was temporarily sheltered from 3 July 1997 to 9 April 2000 in cell no. 1, taking into account the weather, as strong winds could have unbalanced it. Then, the submarine was maintained by former volunteer submariners grouped within the Museum of the Atlantic Submarine Squadron association which was created to support the transformation project of the submarine in the naval museum.

In 2003, the French Navy made the submarine available to the Cap l'Orient urban community to make it a heritage item open to the public. Cap l'Orient then carried out essential conservation work for €550,000, such as painting the hull. However, Cap l'Orient's priority was then the creation of the Éric Tabarly Sailing City. In 2008, Norbert Métairie, mayor of Lorient, relaunched the project of a museum around the submarine. The idea is to discover the innards of a submersible, to talk about the history of the Lorient submarine base, as well as to publicize the evolution of the harbor and its strategic issues. The project benefits from the work carried out by the Museum of the Atlantic Submarine Squadron association team of volunteers, in particular to collect material and objects linked to the life of submariners. It also draws on historical studies prepared by René Estienne, the Navy archivist.

Since 1 May 2010, the submarine has been on display and open to the public in the Flore submarine discovery area, at the Lorient submarine base.

== See also ==
- List of submarines of France
