= HMS Jason (1800) =

Royal Navy fifth-rate frigate

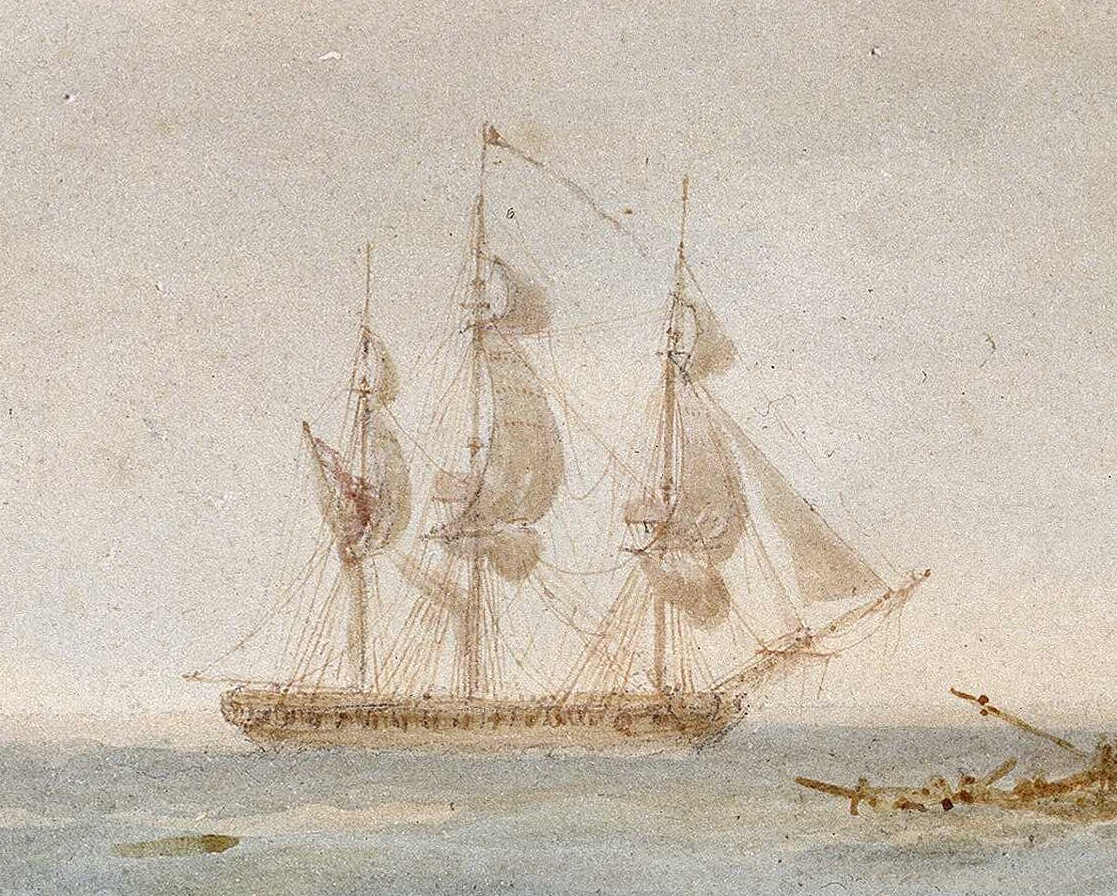
- Drawing of Jason's sister ship Penelope

History

Great Britain
- Name: HMS Jason
- Ordered: 15 September 1798
- Laid down: October 1798
- Launched: 27 January 1800
- Completed: 28 May 1800
- Commissioned: March 1800
- Fate: Wrecked 21 July 1801

General characteristics
- Class & type: Fifth-rate Penelope-class frigate
- Tons burthen: 1,05291/94 (bm)
- Length: 150 ft 2 1/2 in (45.8 m) (gundeck); 125 ft 5 in (38.2 m) (keel)
- Beam: 39 ft 8 3/4 in (12.1 m)
- Draught: 10 ft 5 in (3.2 m) (forwards); 14 ft 5 in (4.4 m) (aft)
- Depth of hold: 13 ft 0 3/4 in (4 m)
- Propulsion: Sails
- Complement: 274
- Armament: UD: 26 × 18-pounder guns; QD: 2 × 9-pounder guns + 10 × 32-pounder carronades; Fc: 2 × 9-pounder guns + 4 × 32-pounder carronades

HMS Jason was a 36-gun fifth-rate Penelope-class frigate, launched in 1800. She served the entirety of her career in the English Channel, mostly in the frigate squadron of Commodore Charles Cunningham. Serving off the coast of France, especially around Le Havre and Cherbourg, she captured several French privateers and recaptured a British merchant ship in a cutting out expedition. Having only been in commission for around fifteen months, Jason was wrecked off the coast of St Malo on 21 July 1801. Her crew were saved and later exchanged, and in August her wreck was burned to prevent the French from rescuing it.

== Design and construction ==
Jason was a 36-gun, 18-pounder, fifth-rate Penelope-class frigate, designed by Sir John Henslow on 4 May 1797. She was one of three ships of the class to be built. They were the largest 36-gun frigates designed by the British during the French Revolutionary War. This large size came about, despite them not being the most heavily armed frigates of the period, because there was a need in the blockading fleets in the English Channel for large, tough frigates that would be able to survive the rough weather that placed considerable stress on the timbers of ships. Fast frigates that had necessarily been built lighter were found to not operate well in these conditions, and so speed was sacrificed for strength specifically for these services.

Ordered to George Parsons' shipyard at Bursledon on 15 September 1798, Jason was laid down in October, named on 15 November, and launched on 27 January 1800 with the following dimensions: (Note: Jason was ordered as part of a batch of 36-gun frigates, with the Apollo-class HMS Apollo and Aigle-class HMS Aigle ordered on the same day.) 150 feet 2 1/2 inches (45.8 m) along the upper deck, 125 feet 5 inches (38.2 m) at the keel, with a beam of 39 feet 8 3/4 inches (12.1 m) and a depth in the hold of 13 feet 0 3/4 inch (4 m). Her draught was 10 feet 5 inches (3.2 m) forwards and 14 feet 5 inches (4.4 m) aft, with the ship measuring 1,05291/94 tons burthen (the average 36-gun frigate was only 950 tons). Jason was fitted out at Portsmouth Dockyard between 30 January and 28 May. (Note: No initial cost is recorded for Jason, but her sister ship HMS Penelope cost £21,133 including fittings.)

The frigate was crewed by 274 men; while her class was laid out as holding thirty-six long guns, Jason was instead armed with thirty long guns and fourteen carronades. Twenty-six 18-pounders were held on the upper deck, with two 9-pounders and ten 32-pounder carronades on the quarterdeck. On the forecastle there were two more 9-pounders and a further four 32-pounder carronades. The carronades took up all the broadside locations on the quarterdeck and forecastle, leaving the four 9-pounders as chase guns.

The original planned armament which favoured more 9-pounders was adjusted to its more carronade-centric focus for Jason on 17 June 1799. This meant she differed considerably from the name-ship of the class, HMS Penelope, which was provided with the standard armament and as such had fewer 32-pounder carronades (eight) and more 9-pounder long guns (eight). The class had actually been designed by Henslow to hold 6-pounders instead of 9-pounders, but this was an oversight on his part, as an Admiralty Order of 25 April 1780 had decreed that all future 36- and 38-gun frigates were to have 9-pounders, and he later corrected his design error, with Jason's build being adjusted on 30 October 1798.

== Service ==
Jason was commissioned mid-way through her fitting out process, in March 1800, by Captain Joseph Sydney Yorke. She sailed from Portsmouth Dockyard on 28 May, the same day the process was completed. Jason later on sailed as escort to a convoy of ships headed for Botany Bay and the East Indies, but with the wind against them they spent almost the entirety of November sheltering at Cowes; the convoy finally sailed on 19 November. Having returned from this duty, Jason began to serve in the English Channel as part of a squadron of eight frigates commanded by Commodore Charles Cunningham, frequently sailing on cruises out of Portsmouth. She captured the French 14-gun privateer La Venus off Cherbourg on 18 January 1801. In early March she detained the Danish brig Bontine while sailing with the 46-gun frigate HMS Loire, taking the vessel in to Portsmouth. Jason and Loire returned to sea on 14 March; at some point under Yorke Jason also captured the French privateer Le Poisson Volant.

By the beginning of April Yorke had left Jason, and he was temporarily replaced by Lieutenant Woodley Losack who served as her acting captain. Serving off Le Havre, on 1 April Jason and the 28-gun frigate HMS Lapwing chased two French frigates that had escaped the port, but the French ships reached Cherbourg before they could be caught. Staying in consort with Lapwing, the two frigates recaptured the British merchant vessel Trafficker on 2 April; she had been taken into Cherbourg by her French capturer, and from there Jason and Lapwing cut her out. On 15 April Jason detained the Danish merchant vessel Hoffnung, sending her in to Plymouth. She then captured the French 14-gun privateer Le Dovad on 1 May. Soon afterwards Losack's acting command came to an end, and he handed Jason over to Captain Volant Vashon Ballard later in the month. Ballard was ordered to take Jason cruising, but no prizes are recorded as being taken during this time, with the ship also involved in convoy protection duties.

Captain the Honourable John Murray replaced Ballard in around July of the same year, and Jason continued to serve in the English Channel. On 21 July the frigate was wrecked on a rock off St Malo. (Note: Naval historian Rif Winfield instead dates the wreck as 24 July.) The weather at the time of the incident was good, described by historian Terence Grocott as a "beautiful day", and the entire crew was saved with help from the local French population. Jason however was irrecoverable, and Murray and the rest of her crew were taken as prisoners of war.

Jason was still a part of Cunningham's squadron, and the commodore organised for her crew to be exchanged at Portsmouth soon afterwards. Jason was still grounded on 5 August, but with the French making efforts to recover the frigate and her armament, Lieutenant Ross of the 16-gun brig-sloop HMS Weazle made an attempt to burn her wreck. He was forced to abort this because of the rising tide that made setting a fire impossible. On the following day Cunningham sent in more boats to assist in the destruction, this time commanded by Lieutenant William Mounsey with assistance from two gun-brigs, the 12-gun HMS Insolent and 14-gun HMS Liberty. The boats succeeded in burning Jason where she lay, while under fire from two French batteries. (Note: The French had been readying two frigates, a corvette, and eight gunboats to go out to Jason's wreck, but she was burned before they were able to set sail.) Having been exchanged, Murray was court martialled for the loss of Jason on 20 August, but he and his officers were acquitted.

== Prizes ==
Vessels captured or destroyed for which Jason's crew received full or partial credit
Date	Ship	Nationality	Type	Fate	Ref.
18 January 1801	La Venus	French	14-gun privateer	Captured	
March 1801	Bontine	Danish	Merchant brig	Detained	
2 April 1801	Trafficker	British	Merchant vessel	Recaptured	
15 April 1801	Hoffnung	Danish	Merchant vessel	Detained	
Before May 1801	Le Poisson Volant	French	Privateer	Captured	
1 May 1801	Le Dovad	French	14-gun privateer	Captured	
