= William Mounsey (Royal Navy officer) =

Captain William Mounsey CB
- Born: 1766; Carlisle
- Died: September 25, 1830 (aged 63–64)
- Military career
- Allegiance: United Kingdom of Great Britain and Ireland
- Branch: Royal Navy
- Service years: 1780 – 1830
- Rank: Captain
- Commands: HMS Rosario; HMS Bonne Citoyenne; HMS Furieuse
- Conflicts: Battle of Cuddalore
- Awards: Naval Gold Medal; Companion of the Order of the Bath

William Mounsey CB (1766 – 25 September 1830) was a Royal Navy officer who served in the American Revolutionary, the French Revolutionary and the Napoleonic Wars, rising to the rank of Captain.

== Family and early life ==
Mounsey was born in 1766, as the fifth son of George Mounsey, of Carlisle. He joined the navy on 23 February 1780, at the age of 13, becoming a midshipman aboard HMS Royal Oak, under Captain Sir Digby Dent, who would become Mounsey's patron. The Royal Oak was sent to the North American Station in May to reinforce Vice-admiral Mariot Arbuthnot's fleet. During the voyage Mounsey took part in the capture of a French East Indiaman. They reached their destination on 13 July, after which Arbuthnot raised his flag aboard the Royal Oak, whilst Dent and Mounsey moved aboard HMS Raisonnable. The Raisonnable then returned home with despatches, but the ship was so badly damaged by a gale whilst crossing the Atlantic, that she was paid off on her arrival for large-scale repairs. Dent and Mounsey transferred again, this time to HMS Repulse, initially under Vice-Admiral George Darby, but later being detached to land stores at Gibraltar in April 1781.

Dent and Mounsey were transferred again at the end of the year, this time to the third rate HMS Cumberland. Dent retired about this time due to ill-health, with Captain William Allen. Mounsey and the Cumberland sailed to the East Indies on 6 February 1782, joining the squadron there under Sir Richard Bickerton. They were in time to see action at the Battle of Cuddalore, between Sir Edward Hughes and the Bailli de Suffren. Cumberland had two killed and 11 wounded in the battle, fought on 20 June 1783. Mounsey returned to England in May 1784, becoming midshipman aboard the sloop HMS Orestes. He passed his lieutenant's examination on 3 December 1788, and went on to serve aboard HMS Arethusa, HMS Victory, HMS Duke and HMS Juno.

== Lieutenancy and promotions ==
With the outbreak of the French Revolutionary Wars, Mounsey returned to HMS Victory, then under Admiral Lord Hood. He was promoted to lieutenant on 22 May 1793, and appointed to HMS Ardent, under Robert Manners-Sutton, and then to the frigate HMS Lowestoffe. He was present at the occupation of Toulon, and at numerous assaults during the capture of Corsica. Whilst blockading Bastia, he led a dangerous attempt to cut-out a vessel laden with gunpowder, lying the harbour. Mounsey was successful, and the loss of the ship accelerate the fall of the city. He returned to Britain aboard HMS Imperieuse, and was afterwards appointed to HMS Trident, HMS Impregnable, HMS Duke, HMS Defiance and HMS Clyde in succession. On 6 July 1801 he led the boats from Clyde and her escorts to destroy the beached wreck of HMS Jason, coming under heavy fire as they did so. Mounsey remained aboard HMS Clyde until being promoted to commander on 29 April 1802. He was appointed on 17 May 1802 to command of the sloop Rosario. During his time aboard her he was tasked with carrying despatches, reconnoitering enemy positions, escorting convoys, and conducting anti-smuggling patrols. Also during this period he captured a number of enemy merchants, as well as a 22-gun privateer.

== HMS Bonne Citoyenne and the Furieuse ==
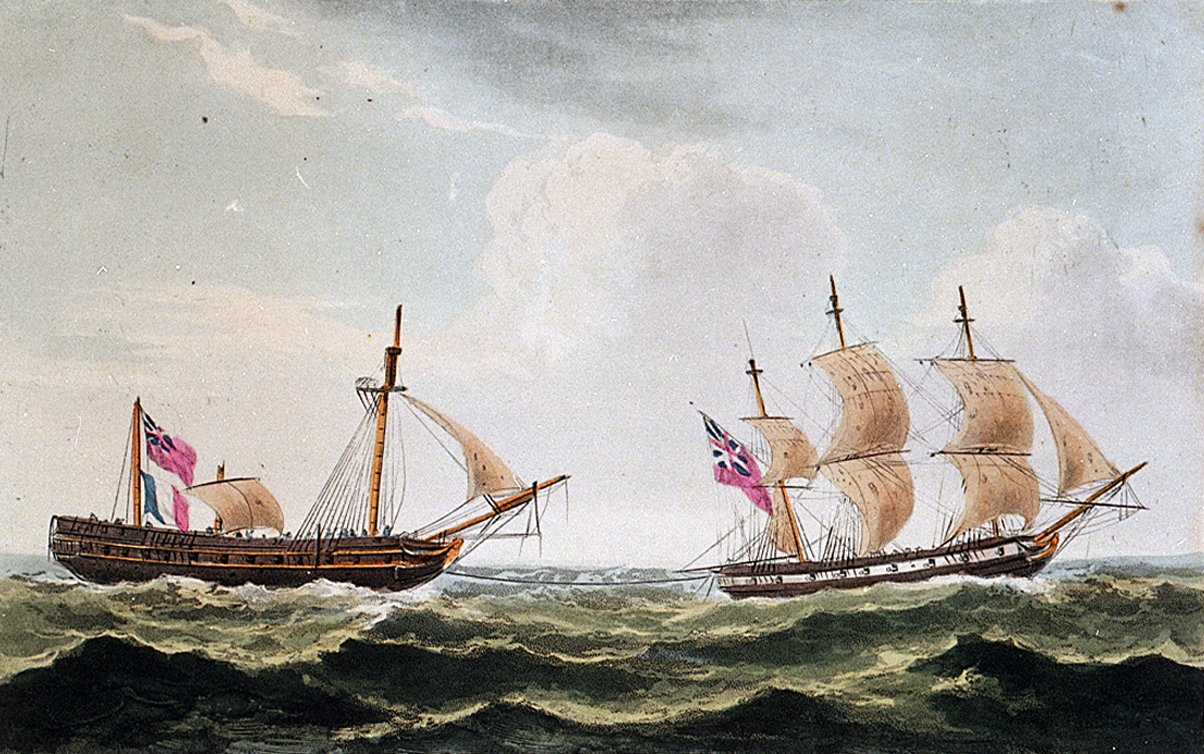
The captured Furieuse is taken in tow, a print by Thomas Whitcombe

He left the Rosario in autumn 1808, and on 18 April 1809, he was appointed to the 20-gun HMS Bonne Citoyenne. He was sent with despatches for Earl St Vincent then at Lisbon. He returned to England after completing this, and on 18 June sailed from Spithead in company with HMS Inflexible. The two were acting as escorts for a convoy bound for Quebec. Whilst travelling with the convoy on 2 July, a suspicious sail was sighted astern, and Mounsey dropped back to investigate. In doing so he lost sight of the convoy and in sailing to rejoin them, came across a French frigate on 5 July, which was in the process of capturing an English merchant. Despite the much larger size of the frigate, Mounsey immediately gave chase, at which the French ship fled northwards. After a chase lasting 18 hours the Bonne Citoyenne caught up with the French ship on the morning of 6 July and brought her to battle. The subsequent engagement lasted seven hours, with Bonne Citoyenne at a disadvantage early on, when three of her guns were dismounted. She nevertheless fired 129 broadsides to the enemy's 70. By the end of the battle Bonne Citoyenne had lost her top masts, her lower masts were badly damaged, and her rigging, sails and boats had been shot to pieces. Running out of powder Mounsey decided to force the issue and ordered his men to be prepared to board the French ship. Before he could do so, the French surrendered and Mounsey took possession.

The enemy ship was discovered to be the Furieuse, which had sailed from the Îles des Saintes on 1 April, carrying sugar and coffee to France. She was capable of carrying 48 guns, but was only carrying 20 at the time. Despite this she had a much larger crew, with 200 sailors, 40 soldiers, and a detachment of troops from the 60th regiment of the line. She had suffered heavy damage, with her masts shot away, five feet of water in the hold and 35 killed and 37 wounded. In contrast, Bonne Citoyenne had just one man killed and five wounded. The frigate was patched up and towed into Halifax, where both were repaired. The captured frigate was later commissioned into the Royal Navy as HMS Furieuse, whilst the Bonne Citoyenne returned to England in September.

The capture of the Furieuse was hailed as a great victory. Henry Phipps, First Lord of the Admiralty wrote to Mounsey

Sir, - I did not fail this day, to lay before his Majesty the particulars of your conduct in the attack and capture of the Furieuse, French frigate, on 6 July. The enterprising gallantry with which you approached and attack a ship bearing such an appearance of a commanding superiority of force, and the skill, courage, and perseverance manifested by you, and the officers, seamen, and marines under your command, during an action of such long continuance, and so warmly contested, have received his Majesty's fullest approbation...

A round of promotions followed the victory, the first lieutenant was promoted to commander and Mounsey was promoted to post captain. He was offered command of the Furieuse, once she had been repaired, which he accepted, taking command on her commissioning in November 1811.

== Command of the Furieuse ==
Mounsey and the Furieuse were initially employed in escorting a convoy to the Mediterranean, after which she joined the fleet blockading Toulon under Admiral Edward Pellew. The French fleet sailed out in May 1812, consisting of 12 sail of the line and seven frigates, of which one ship of the line and two frigates began to chase the British inshore squadron, consisting of the Furieuse, and the frigates HMS Menelaus and HMS Havannah, and the brig HMS Pelorus. The French gave up the chase when the British made clear their intention to fight.

On 9 November 1812 Mounsey captured the French privateer Nebrophonus, and on 10 January 1813 captured the privateer Argus. In February 1813 Mounsey supported Charles John Napier in HMS Thames in the capture of the island of Ponza. They landed troops on 26 February, under fire from shore batteries, which soon subdued resistance. The capture of the harbour eliminated an infamous corsair haven, and provided an anchorage for Royal Navy ships watching Naples. On 7 May boats from Furieuse captured the French Conception, towing her out to sea under heavy fire. One man was killed and another five wounded in this operation. On 4 October a convoy was sighted off Civitavecchia. Despite being heavily protected by two gunboats and a number of shore batteries, an operation was attempted. Marines from Furieuse's boats stormed and captured a fort, under cover from Furieuse's guns. The enemy retreated to a nearby castle and continued to fire on the British forces. Nevertheless, the British were able to sink the gunboats, and bring out 16 of the merchant ships. The Furieuse kept up a steady fire, preventing reinforcements from Civitavecchia from intervening. Two of the British party were killed and 10 wounded in the operation.

For the rest of 1813 Furieuse formed part of Admiral Sir Josias Rowley's squadron, and was present at the capture of Via Reggio, and the unsuccessful assault on Livorno in December. In early March 1814, still with Rowley, Furieuse assisted in the occupation of La Spezia and the surrounding areas. On 17 April a squadron consisting of Furieuse, HMS Aboukir, HMS Iphigenia, HMS Swallow and HMS Cephalus supported the successful assault on Genoa. The end of the War of the Sixth Coalition in 1814 led to Furieuse transferring to the Caribbean, where she escorted transports. She conveyed the 62nd regiment to Halifax, and with the end of the War of 1812, remained in the area to support the troops.

HMS Furieuse was paid off in autumn 1815 and was sold for breaking up in October 1816 at Deptford. Mounsey was nominated a Companion of the Order of the Bath in June 1815, and also received the Naval Gold Medal for the capture of the Furieuse. With the end of the wars with France he retired from active service, and died on 25 September 1830 at the age of 64.
