= Woodley Losack =

Captain Woodley Losack
- Born: 5 October 1769; Basseterre, Saint Kitts
- Died: 30 May 1838 (aged 68); Nice, France
- Relatives: Admiral George Losack (brother)
- Military career
- Allegiance: Great Britain; United Kingdom
- Branch: Royal Navy
- Rank: Captain
- Commands: HMS Jason; HMS Helena; HMS Prince George; HMS Galatea
- Conflicts: French Revolutionary Wars; Napoleonic Wars; Battle of Tamatave

Captain Woodley Francis Losack (5 October 1769 – 30 May 1838) was a Royal Navy officer who served in the French Revolutionary Wars and the Napoleonic Wars. He participated in the Battle of Tamatave (1811) as captain of HMS Galatea.

== Family background ==
He was the youngest of the eight children of Richard (James) Hawkshaw Losack and Christiana Losack (née Maclure). Woodley Losack was born on 5 October 1769 in Basseterre, Saint Kitts. His father Richard was appointed the Lieutenant Governor of the Leeward Islands. His brother George Losack preceded him into the Royal Navy and rose to the rank of admiral.

== Early naval career ==
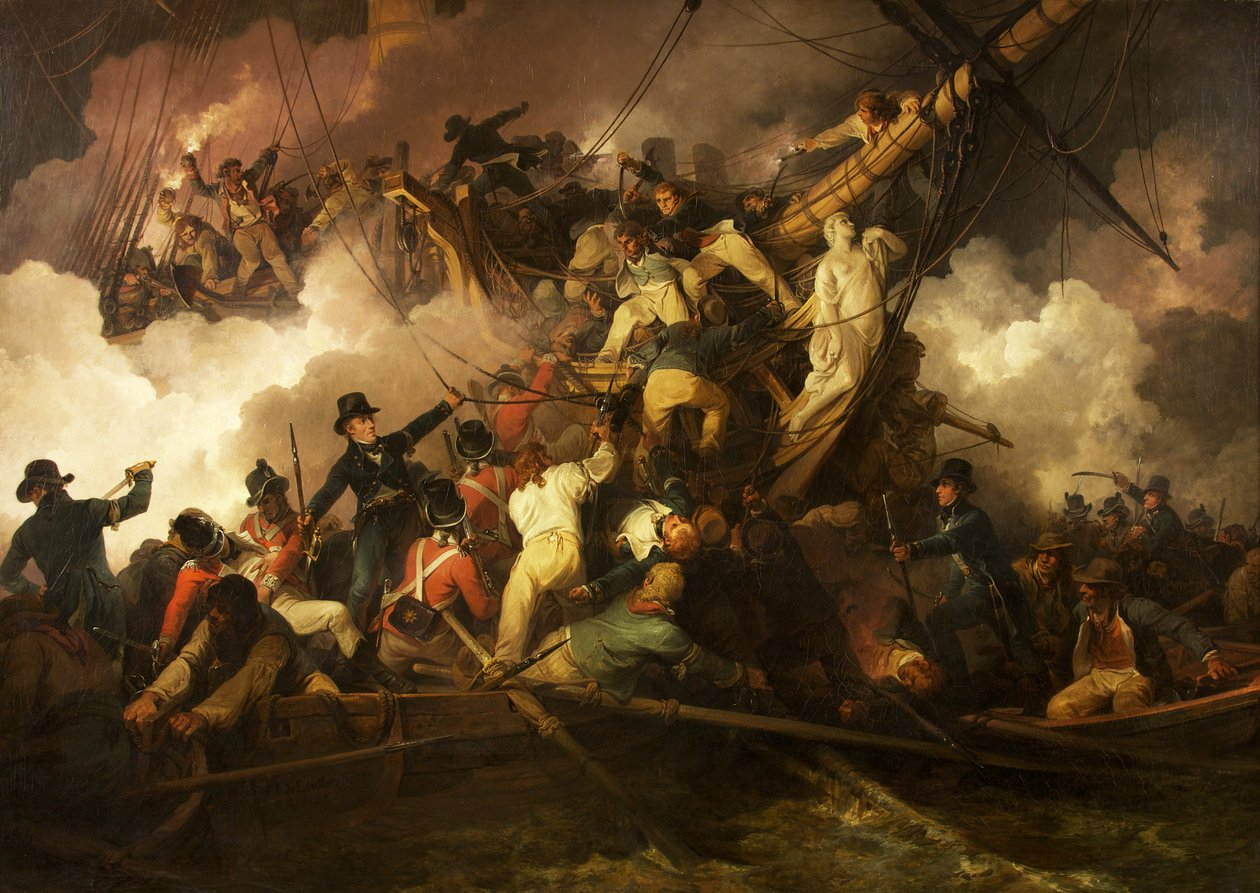
The Capture of the Chevrette, Philip James de Loutherbourg (1802)

As a lieutenant, Losack served on HMS Ville de Paris, the flagship of Admiral William Cornwallis, and participated in the enterprise to cut out la Chevrette, a French corvette, of 20 nine-pounders and 350 men, from under the batteries in Camaret Bay, near Brest, on the night of 21 July 1801. Lieutenant Losack and Lieutenant Keith Maxwell were promoted to the rank of commander for their services in this enterprise.

In 1801, he was appointed captain and held the temporary command of the 36-gun fifth rate HMS Jason in the spring of 1801. On 1 May 1801, Jason captured la Dorade, a brig privateer of 14 guns and 51 men. Later that year, he was appointed Captain of HMS Helena (1804), an 18-gun sloop. On 5 June 1805, the Helena captured the Santa Leocadia, a Spanish privateer of 14 guns and 114 men.

== Post-captain ==
Losack was made post-captain on 22 January 1806. In 1807, he was appointed as Captain of the second rate ship of the line HMS Prince George. Following the concern in Britain that neutral Denmark was entering an alliance with Napoleon, the Prince George sailed in the squadron in the expedition to occupy the Danish West Indies, with the squadron under the command of Rear-Admiral Alexander Cochrane, who sailed in HMS Belleisle. The squadron, which included HMS Northumberland, HMS Canada, HMS Ramillies and HMS Cerberus, captured the Telemaco, Carvalho and Master on 17 April 1807.

== Battle of Tamatave ==
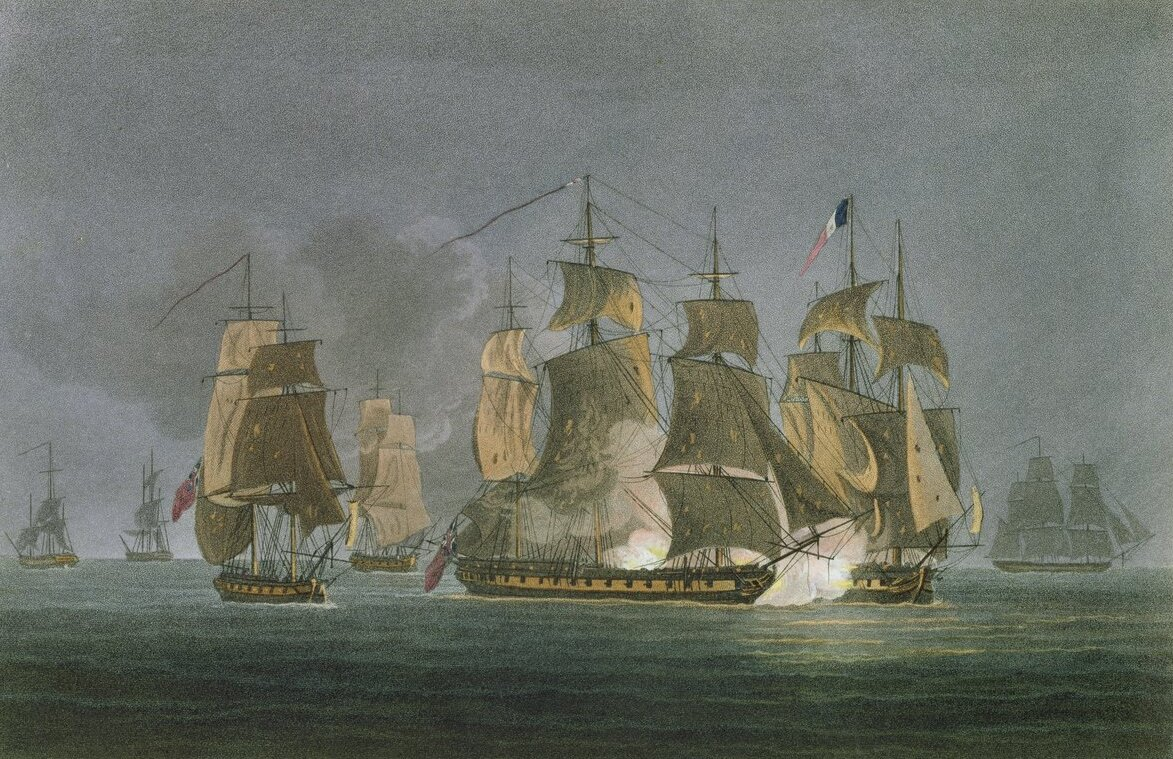
The Battle of Tamatave

From 7 September 1810 to July 1814, he was Captain of the fifth rate HMS Galatea. On 20 May 1811, he took part in the Battle of Tamatave between a squadron, under the command of Captain Charles Marsh Schomberg, which comprised three English frigates (HMS Galatea, HMS Phoebe and HMS Astraea), and the brig-sloop HMS Racehorse, and three French vessels of superior force (Renommée, Clorinde and Néréide).

The action marked the end of the final French attempt to operate in the Indian Ocean during the Napoleonic Wars. The surviving participants in the battle qualified for the Naval General Service Medal, which was awarded in 1847 with clasp "Off Tamatave 20 May 1811".

There were recriminations among the British squadron, Schomberg praising Astraea and Phoebe but omitting Racehorse and Galatea from the recommendations in his post-battle report. Captain Losack was particularly offended as Schomberg had implied that Galatea's distress signal that was flown during the battle was an overreaction in the face of the enemy, despite her casualties being greater than the rest of the squadron combined. (Note: Lieutenant Hugh Peregrine of the Royal Marines and 15 men were either killed or mortally wounded; Captain Losack, Lieutenant Thomas Bevis, Lieutenant Henry Lewis, midshipmen Henry Williams and Alexander Henning, 21 men and three boys were all wounded.)

He subsequently requested a court martial to clear any suggestion of cowardice from his name but the Admiralty refused, commenting that they were fully satisfied with his conduct. Historian William James claims that opinion within the Navy was also with Losack and that Schomberg had been excessively harsh in his criticism.
