= French ship Flore =

Eight ships of the French Navy have borne the name Flore (Flora):

- Flore (1707–1724), a 10-gun frigate
- Flore (1729–1754)
- Flore (1769–1785)
- Flore (1806–1811), a 44-gun frigate that took part in the Battle of Lissa
- Hortense (1803–1840), a 40-gun frigate renamed to Flore in 1814
- Flore (1869–1886), a sail frigate converted to steam before launch
- Flore (1937–1950), a destroyer
- Flore (1964–1993), a Daphné-class submarine, now on display at Lorient

The French frigate Vestale (1756) was renamed HMS Flora after her capture by the Royal Navy, and was named Flore américaine after she was re-acquired from the United States.
