= Dick (1788 ship) =

British merchant ship and convict transport 1788–1822

History

Great Britain
- Name: Dick
- Owner: 1788:Q. Dick
- Builder: Peter Everitt Mestaer, King and Queen Dock, Rotherhithe, Thames
- Launched: 23 February 1788
- Fate: Last listed 1822

General characteristics
- Tons burthen: 386, or 398, or 402, or 403 (bm)
- Propulsion: Sail
- Armament: 6 × 6-pounder guns

Dick was a merchant ship built in 1788 in Rotherhithe, on the River Thames, England. She initially sailed as a West Indiaman. Her role and whereabouts between 1796 and 1810 are obscure. Later, she made two voyages as a troop transport, one to Ceylon and one to New South Wales. She then made one voyage in 1820 transporting convicts to New South Wales. She was last listed in 1822.

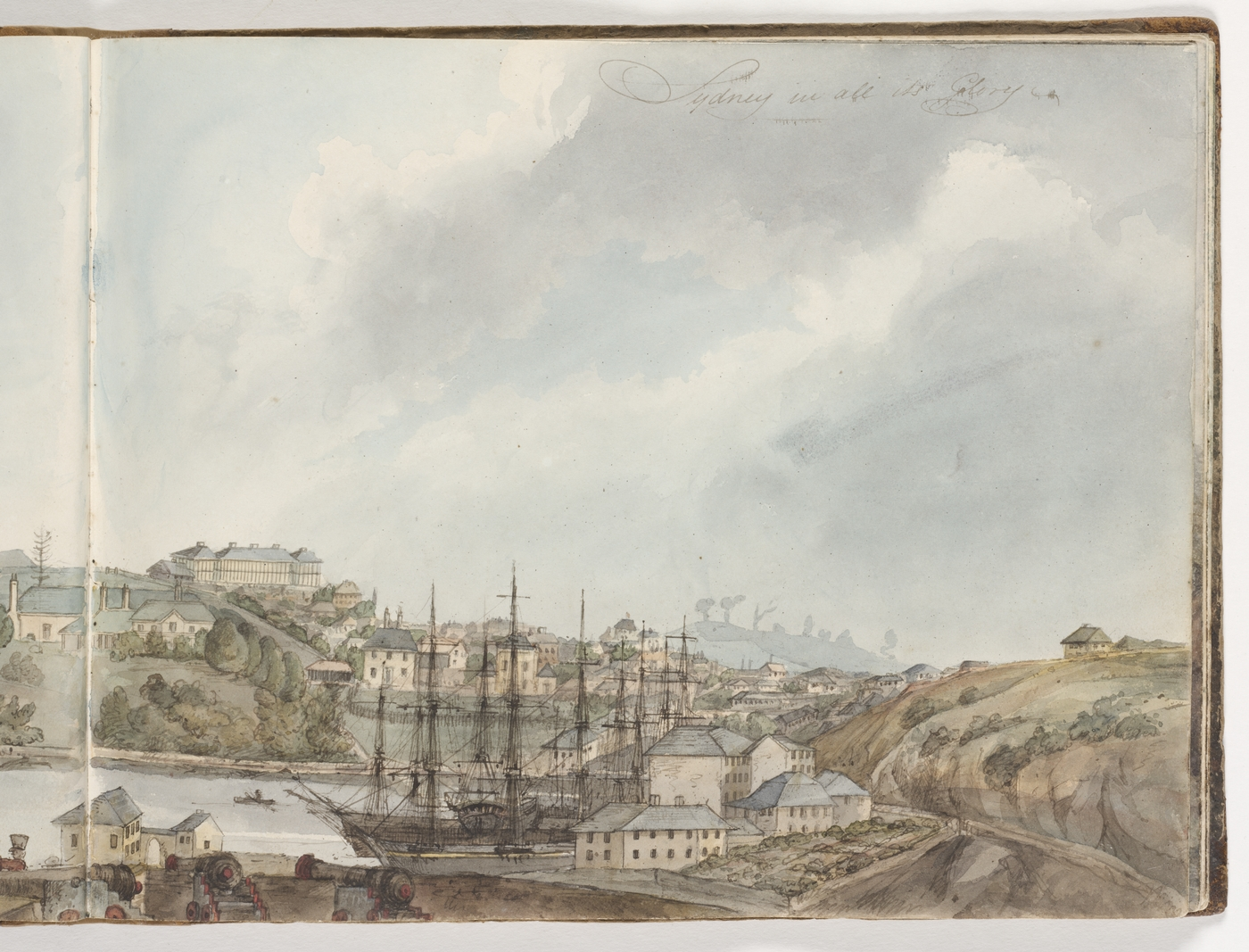
View of ships in Sydney Harbour c1817. State Library of New South Wales

== Career ==
Dick first appeared in Lloyd's Register (LR) in 1789.

Year	Master	Owner	Trade	Source
1789	Flannery	Q.Dick	London–Tortola	LR
1795	Flannery	Q.Dick	London–Tortola	LR

Dick disappeared from LR in 1796 and reappeared only in 1812. She first appeared in the Register of Shipping (RS) in 1810 (RS only commenced publishing in 1800). The two sources did not agree on a number of details. The registers were only as accurate as owners chose to keep them.

Year	Master	Owner	Trade	Source
1810	Macdonald	Ward	London–Jamaica	RS
1812	Macdonald	Ward	London–Jamaica	RS
1812	Harrison	T.Ward	London	LR; repairs 1812
1813	Harrison	T.Ward	London	LR; repairs 1812
1814	D.Tyrer; W.Harrison	T.Ward	Liverpool–Cork; Cowes transport	LR; repairs 1812
1816	W.Harrison	T.Ward	Cowes transport	LR; repairs 1812

In 1813 the British East India Company (EIC) had lost its monopoly on the trade between India and Britain. British ships were then free to sail to India or the Indian Ocean under a license from the EIC. Dick presumably brought a cargo from India back to Britain under such a license.

Year	Master	Owner	Trade	Source
1818	Harrison	T.Ward	London–West Indies; London–India	LR; repairs 1812 & 1813

Although LR showed Dick sailing to India, she did not appear on the annual lists of licensed vessels trading with India. Instead, she initially sailed to New South Wales.

On 18 March 1817, Dick, Harrison, master, arrived at the Cove of Cork, bound for New South Wales. Dick left Cork, Ireland on 3 April 1817. On 10 May she was at Rio de Janeiro; she sailed again on 11 June. She arrived at Sydney on 3 September 1817. She brought troops in the form of a detachment of the 48th Regiment of Foot commanded by Major Cimitiere. Lieutenant Phillip Parker King was a passenger. Dick left Port Jackson on 5 October, bound for Madras. On 24 December she arrived at Madras. She did not arrive back at Gravesend until 12 September 1818.

On 6 January 1818, Dick, Harrison, master, was at Deal, bound for Ceylon. On 1 February she was at the Cove of Cork. On 23 February she sailed for Ceylon, again serving as a transport. (Sailing as a government transport obviated the need for an EIC license.) She arrived at Madeira on 4 March and sailed on 6 March. On 16 May she was at the Cape of Good Hope and sailed on the 28th. She arrived at Colombo on 28 July. She sailed on to Bengal. She sailed from Colombo on 23 January 1819, presumably having returned there from Bengal. She arrived at deal on 16 May from the Cape and Ceylon.

Convict voyage (1820–1821): Under the command of William Harrison and surgeon Robert Armstrong, Dick sailed from London, England on 4 November 1820 and arrived at Sydney on 12 March 1821. She had embarked 140 male convicts and had no deaths en route. The guard consisted of detachments of the 24th Regiment of Foot, under the command of Lieutenant Isaacson of the 47th Regiment of Foot.

Dick, Harrison, master, arrived at Batavia on 21 June. On 8 August Dick, Harrison, master, was still at Batavia, loading. She had lost anchors and cables on her way there from New South Wales. She arrived at St Helena on 31 December from Batavia. On 13 March 1822 Dick arrived at Gravesend, having lost an anchor between Deal and Margate.

Year	Master	Owner	Trade	Source & notes
1822	W.Harrison	T.Ward	London–India	LR; repairs 1812 & 1813

Dick was last listed in Lloyd's Register for 1822.
