= Dick (1798 ship) =

British merchant and slave ship 1798–1809

History

Great Britain
- Name: Dick
- Builder: Spain
- Acquired: 1798 by purchase of a prize
- Fate: Last listed in 1809

General characteristics
- Tons burthen: 210, or 211, or 243, or 250, or 251 (bm)
- Complement: 1798: 30; 1801:40
- Armament: 1798: 20 × 9-pounder guns; 1801:20 × 9&6-pounder guns

Dick was a French vessel built in Spain, almost certainly sailing under another name, that the British captured circa 1798. She made a voyage to the West Indies during which she repelled two attacks, and captured three prizes. She then became a slave ship that made three voyages transporting enslaved people. Her first voyage was cut short when a French privateer captured her and the Royal Navy recaptured her. She then made two complete voyages. After her return in 1803 from her third voyage she became a West Indiaman. She grounded in 1804 after another vessel had run into her. She was last listed in 1809.

== Career ==
Dick first appeared in Lloyd's Register (LR) in 1798.

| Year | Master | Owner | Trade | Source |
|---|---|---|---|---|
| 1798 | J.Duck | Cullen & Co. | Liverpool–Africa | LR |

Captain Isaac Duck acquired a letter of marque on 5 June 1798.

In March 1799 Lloyd's List (LL) reported that Dick, Duck, master, had come into Gibraltar. She had been on her way to Martinique when she had had to repel an attack by eight gunboats. Dick, Duck, master, arrived at Barbados from Gibraltar and Martinique with three prizes. She then returned to Martinique with her prizes. LL reported in October 1799 that Dick, Duck, master, had arrived back at Liverpool from Martinique after having repelled an attack by a French corvette. The engagement lasted three hour. The underwriters (insurers) of the voyage awarded Captain Duck an honorarium of 200 guineas.

1st voyage transporting enslaved people (1800): Captain William Graham sailed from Liverpool on 6 October 1800. In 1800, 133 vessels sailed from English ports, bound for the trade in enslaved people; 120 of these vessels sailed from Liverpool.

On 15 October the French privateer Grande Decide, of 18 guns and 140 men, captured Dick, Graham, master, after a seven hour engagement. Graham and 12 men on Dick were wounded; Grande Decide had 27 men killed and wounded. The next day HMS Clyde and Fisgard recaptured Dick. On 22 October Clyde arrived in Plymouth Sound with the ship Dick, Guineaman, of Liverpool, in tow. Dick had suffered extensive damage in a fight against a French privateer before Clyde was able to recapture her.

2nd voyage transporting enslaved people (1801–1802): Captain John Maginnis acquired a letter of marque on 1 January 1801. Dick sailed from Liverpool on 9 March, bound for the Congo River. In 1801, 147 vessels sailed from English ports, bound for the trade in enslaved people; 122 of these vessels sailed from Liverpool.

Dick acquired captives first at Iles de Los, and then at Cape Mount. Her principal place of purchase was the Congo River, her third purchase location. Dick arrived at Trinidad on 18 February 1802 with 172 captives. She sailed from Trinidad on 16 March and arrived back at Liverpool on 27 April. She had left Liverpool with 46 crew members and had 22 when she arrived at Trinidad. In all, she suffered 12 deaths on her voyage.

3rd voyage transporting enslaved people (1802–1803): Captain George Irvin sailed from Liverpool on 25 September 1802, bound for West Africa. In 1802, 155 vessels sailed from English ports, bound for the trade in enslaved people; 122 of these vessels sailed from Liverpool.

Dick arrived at Suriname on 27 April 1803, and arrived back at Liverpool on 27 August. She had left Liverpool with 27 crew members and suffered 13 crew deaths on her voyage. She had been sold in Surname. Before she arrived at Liverpool, though, she stopped at Bearhaven.

New owners employed Dick as a West Indiaman.

| Year | Master | Owner | Trade | Source & notes |
|---|---|---|---|---|
| 1804 | Irvine; J.Robertson | Mather & Co. | Liverpool–Africa; Liverpool–St Vincent | Register of Shipping; good repairs 1800 & 1802, & damages repaired 1804 |

Dick, Robertson, master, ended up on Sandwich Flats in January 1804 on her way from London to St Vincents after William and Henry had run into her as Dick was anchored in the Downs. Dick was gotten off and came into Ramsgate.

| Year | Master | Owner | Trade | Source & notes |
|---|---|---|---|---|
| 1805 | J.Robertson | Charlton | London–St Vincent | LR |

== Fate ==
Dick was last listed in 1809. However, she did not appear in LL's ship arrival and departure data after 1804.
