= HMS Clyde (1796) =

Frigate of the Royal Navy

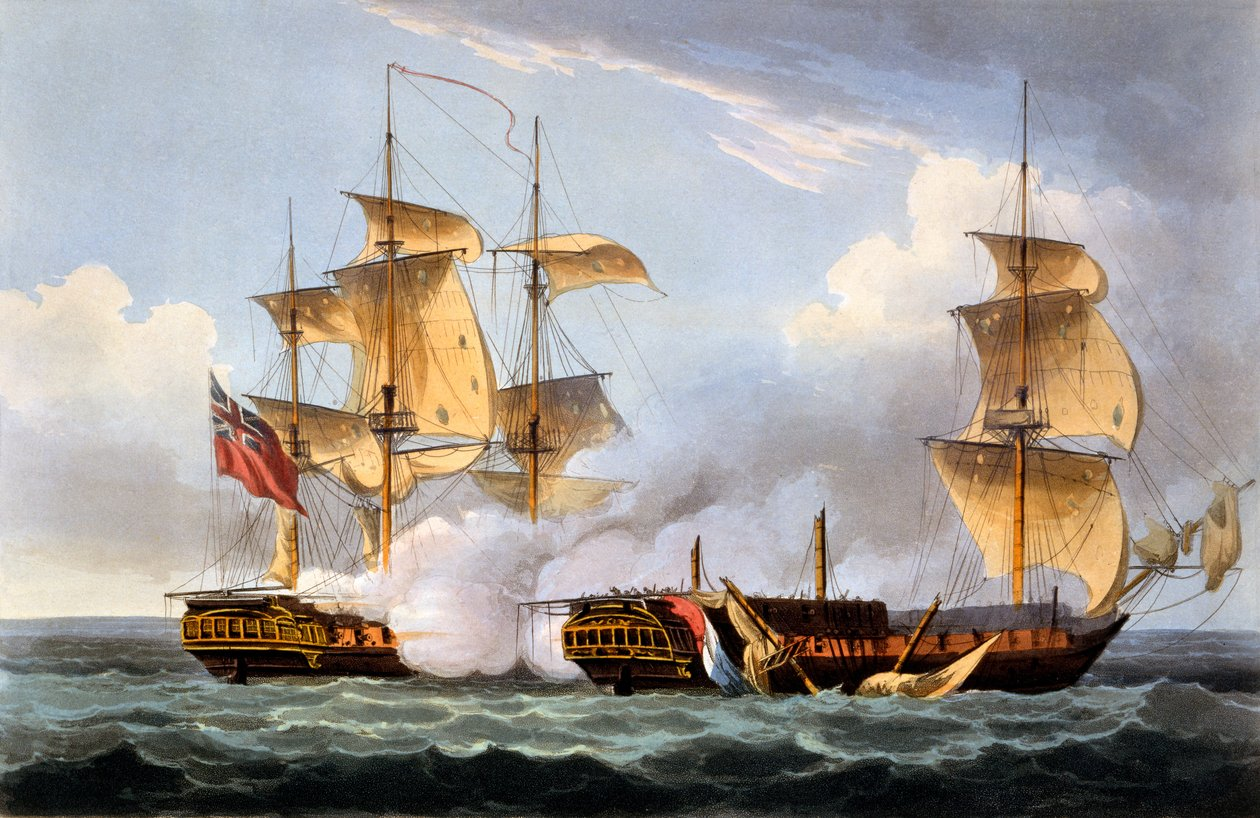
- Clyde (left) capturing Vestale on 20 August 1799

History

Great Britain
- Name: HMS Clyde
- Namesake: River Clyde
- Ordered: 4 February 1795
- Builder: Chatham Dockyard; M/shipwright Thomas Pollard until June 1795; Edward Sisson thereafter
- Laid down: June 1795
- Launched: 26 March 1796
- Fate: Dismantled, 1805

United Kingdom
- Launched: 28 February 1806
- Fate: Sold, August 1814

General characteristics
- Class & type: Artois-class fifth rate frigate
- Tons burthen: First incarnation:102034/94 (bm); Second incarnation:991 (bm)
- Length: First incarnation: 146 ft 0 in (44.5 m) (overall); 122 ft 0 3/4 in (37.2 m) (keel); Second incarnation: 146 ft 0 in (44.5 m) (overall); 121 ft 4 3/4 in (37.0 m) (keel)
- Beam: First incarnation: 39 ft 3 1/2 in (12.0 m); Second incarnation: 39 ft 2 in (11.9 m)
- Draught: First incarnation: 9 ft 0 in (2.7 m) (unladen); 14 ft 1 in (4.3 m) (laden); Second incarnation: 146 ft 0 in (44.5 m) (unladen)
- Depth of hold: First incarnation: 13 ft 9 in (4.2 m); Second incarnation: 13 ft 9 in (4.2 m)
- Complement: 270; later 315
- Armament: Upper deck:28 × 18-pounder guns; QD:2 × 9-pounder guns + 12 × 32-pounder carronades; Fc:2 × 9-pounder guns + 2 × 32-pounder carronades

HMS Clyde was a 32-gun Artois-class frigate of the Royal Navy built at Chatham Dockyard of fir (pitch pine), and launched in 1796. In 1797, she was one of only two ships whose captains were able to maintain some control over their vessels during the Nore mutiny. In 1805, HMS Clyde was dismantled and rebuilt at Woolwich Dockyard; she was relaunched on 23 February 1806. She was ultimately sold in August 1814.

== First incarnation ==
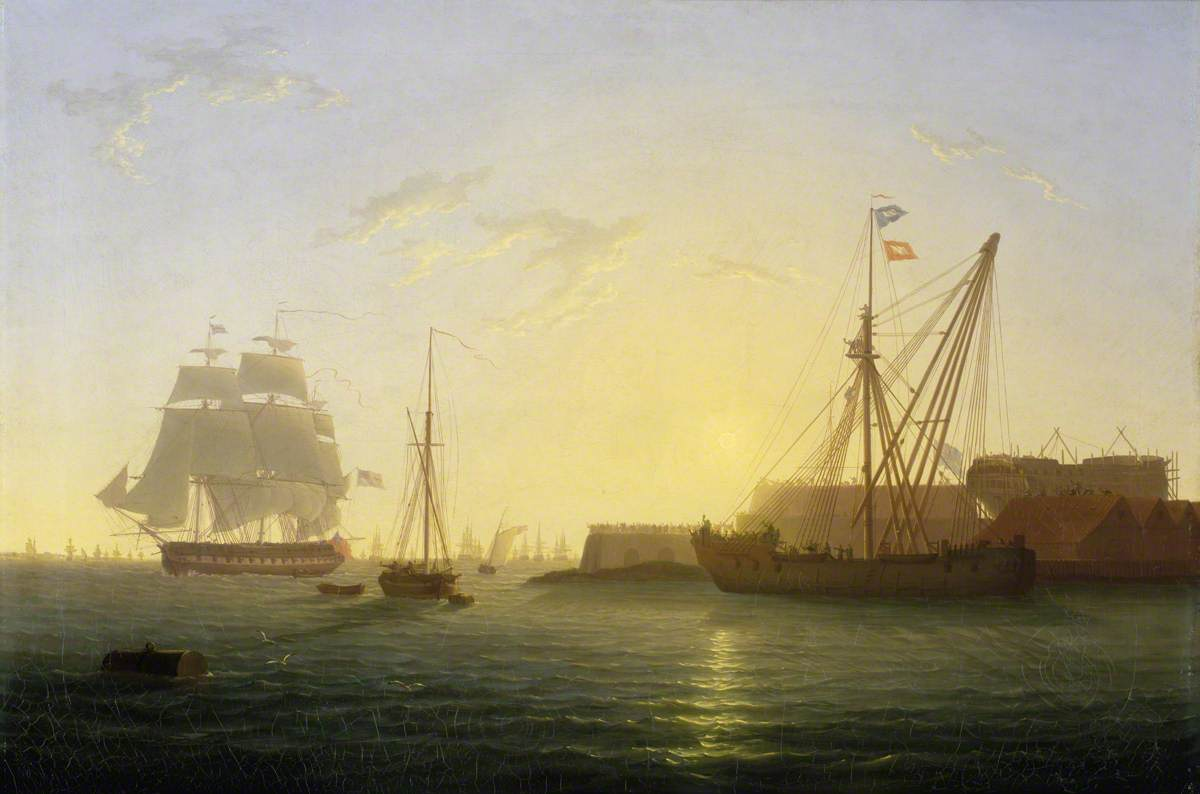
Clyde arriving at Sheerness after the Nore mutiny on 30 May 1797

Captain Charles Cunningham commissioned Clyde in April 1796. She shared with Venerable, Repulse, Tamar, and the cutters Flora and Princess Royal in the proceeds of the capture on 6 September of Hare.

Clyde was at the Nore at the time of the mutiny, but escaped to Sheerness on 29/30 May 1797.

Clyde and St Fiorenzo shared in the capture in November and December 1797 of the French brigs Minerva and Succès (or Success). Success was a privateer from Bayonne that been out 15 days and had only captured one American vessel.

In addition to the capture of Success on 13 December, St Fiorenzo and Clyde captured the privateer Dorade eight days later. The actual captor of Dorade was Clyde. Dorade was from Bordeaux and was pierced for 18 guns, though she only had 12. She had been out 50 days and had been cruising off the Azores and Madeira, but had captured nothing. She and her crew of 93 men were on their way home when Clyde captured her. Unfortunately, the commander of the prize crew hoisted too much sail with the result that Dorade overturned, drowning all 19 members of the prize crew.

In March 1798 Clyde captured two merchant vessels. She captured the ship Vrouw Classina on 22 March, and recaptured Anne two days later. Then in May Clyde captured Marie Perotte and in June recaptured Sea Nymphe. Clyde, San Fiorenzo, Phaeton, Anson, Mermaid, and Stag, shared in the capture of the chasse maree Marie Perotte and a sloop of unknown name, as well as the recapture of Sea Nymphe and Mary.

On 4 January 1799, Clyde recaptured the ship Hiram. Six days later, Clyde captured the letter of marque schooner Aire, which was sailing from Brest to Santo Domingo. Then three days later, Clyde captured the French privateer brig Bon Ordre. Bon Ordre was armed with 16 guns and carried a crew of 65 men. She had sailed on 20 December from Granville and had captured a brig from Newfoundland two weeks before she herself was captured. On 9 March 1799, St Fiorenzo and Clyde captured the French sloop St Joseph.

Clyde captured the American ship Nymph on 11 April.

In August, Clyde was off the coast of France. On 21 August, she was six or seven leagues northwest of the Cordovan Lighthouse near the mouth of the Gironde when she observed two sail. As Clyde approached, they separated, and she pursued the larger. Clyde brought her quarry to action, eventually forcing the French vessel to strike. The French vessel was Vestale, a 32-gun frigate and a crew of 235 men under the command of M. P.M. Gaspard. (Note: French records report that her captain was capitaine de frégate Denis-Trobriande, but that he had died on 16 May. His successor was enseigne de vaisseau Gaspard.) She had sailed from Cádiz with dispatches for Saint Domingue and was on her return voyage. She carried a number of passengers who she had landed at Passages (Pasajes) two days earlier, and was now on her way to Rochefort. In the engagement, Clyde lost two men killed and three wounded; Vestale had ten men killed and 22 wounded, several of whom died later. Vestale's consort, the 20-gun corvette Sagesse had too large a lead and escaped into the Garonne. (Note: Sagesse, which was under the command of lieutenant de vaisseau Jalabert, had come from Guadelope via Pasajes, and was sailing for Rochefort.)

On 11 and 28 May 1800, Clyde captured a chasse maree of unknown name, and another chasse maree, called Clarre Voyante. In between, on 12 May, Clyde, Thames and the hired armed cutter Suwarrow captured a French chasse maree, name unknown.

On 22 October 1800, Clyde arrived in Plymouth Sound with Guineaman Dick, of Liverpool, in tow. Dick had suffered extensive damage in a fight against a French privateer before Clyde was able to recapture her. When he arrived in the Sound, Cunningham reported the names of the vessels Clyde had captured or recaptured on her last cruise.

- Deux Ami, a Spanish letter of marque, of four guns and 27 men, that had been sailing from Vera Cruz to St Andero, and which Clyde had burnt in the harbour of St. Vincent;
- Beloz (or Belos), a Spanish packet ship, of four guns and 30 men, that had been sailing from Havannah to Corunna when Clyde captured her;
- Rose, a French schooner sailing from Bourdeaux to Guadaloupe; and
- Magicienne, a French schooner, that had been sailing from Senegal to Bordeaux.

Cunningham also reported that the captor of Dick, Guineaman, had been the French privateer Grande Decidee, and that Fisgard, which had been in sight when Clyde recaptured Dick, had captured Grande Decidee two hours later.

In June 1802 Captain John Larmour replaced Cunningham. Clyde then served in the North Sea. She captured sundry fishing vessels between 8 and 10 June 1803. She shared the proceeds of the capture by agreement with Captain Vansittart of Fortunee. On 21 September Clyde captured the French privateer schooner Caroline.

On 7 July 1803, Clyde was in company when the gun-brig Adder captured the Napoleon, Klock, master. (Note: When the last of the prize money for the vessel arrived, it was so slight the agents for the vessels invested the money in one and a half tickets for the lottery on 14 January 1814, the proceeds being for the account of the captors.) Clyde, Ambuscade, Fortunee, and Beaver was among the vessels that shared in the proceeds of the capture on 27 August 1803 of Henrick and Jan, Vriede Frederick Ipsia, master.

Clyde was hauled up on a slip at Woolwich on 10 February 1805. There the Navy had her broken dismantled and rebuilt.

== Second incarnation ==
Captain Edward William C.R. Owen (or Owens) recommissioned Clyde February 1806. He would remain her captain until 1810. Under his command, Clyde recaptured Louisa.

By June 1806 Owen was a Commodore and Clyde was at The Downs, and in the Walmer Roads.

On 20 February 1807 Clyde was in company with Otter and Kangaroo and so shared in the salvage money for the recapture of Farely, John Fryer, master.

On 25 August 1807, Owen sent Clyde's boats to capture a French sloop near Yport. The sloop ran on shore and the boats had to come in under fire from small arms, a field piece, a mortar, and the guns of batteries at Fécamp. The boats succeeded in recovering the sloop Trois Soeurs, of Caen, which had been carrying Plaster of Paris, possibly to Boulogne. The exploit was free of casualties on either side. In November, Clyde recaptured the transport Louisa.

In 1809 Clyde participated in the ill-fated Walcheren Campaign. A British force landed on 30 July 1809, and withdrew in December, having accomplished little and having suffered extensive casualties, primarily from disease. On 13 August Clyde was to the south-west of Flushing, with Owen in command of the bomb and other vessels bombarding the town. The next day San Domingo, the flagship of Admiral Sir Richard John Strachan grounded; Clyde came to her assistance until she could be refloated. On 8 December Clyde was at the Woolversdyke protecting the expedition's retreat. Between 23 and 28 December, Owen managed the withdrawal of the British forces from the Scheld. Clyde shared in the prize money for the property the British army captured during the campaign.

On 6 February 1810 Clyde was under the command of Captain John Stuart when, after a five-hour chase, she captured the French privateer lugger Transit, of 14 guns and 45 men. Transit was last out of Bordeaux.

== Fate ==
Clyde was laid up at Portsmouth in December 1810. The Principal Officers and Commissioners of the Navy offered her for sale on 11 August 14, and sold her for £2,300 that month. The bidders had to post a bond of £3000 that they would break her up within a year.
