= Flora (1813 ship) =

History

United Kingdom
- Name: Flora
- Launched: July 1813, Narsipore, Coromandel Coast.
- Fate: Sold 1823

General characteristics
- Tons burthen: 259, 2593/94, or 261 (bm)
- Length: 86 ft 6 in (26.4 m)
- Beam: 27 ft 10 in (8.5 m)

Flora was launched in July 1813 at Narsipore. Although she appears in a book listing all vessels that sailed for the British East India Company, or under a licence from it, she does not appear in Lloyd's Register's listing of vessels sailing under such licenses. Flora was sold in 1823 at Penang.
