= Flora (1801 ship) =

UK merchant ship 1801–1813

History

United Kingdom
- Name: Flora
- Builder: India
- In service: 1801
- Fate: Last listed 1813
- Notes: Hackman conflates this Flora with Flora.

General characteristics
- Tons burthen: 217 (bm)
- Complement: 35
- Armament: 1802: 2 × 4-pounder guns; 1803:16 × 6-pounder guns + 4 swivel guns; 1807:16 × 6-pounder carronades
- Notes: Teak-built

Flora was built in India. She first appeared in British records in 1801 as a West Indiaman. She was last listed in Lloyd's Register (LR) in 1813.

== Career ==
Flora first appeared in LR in 1801.

| Year | Master | Owner | Trade | Source & notes |
|---|---|---|---|---|
| 1801 | John Ritchie | Heathfield | London–Jamaica | LR |
| 1802 | Ritchie; A.Grant | Captain & Co. | London–Jamaica | Register of Shipping |

Captain Andrew Grant acquired a letter of marque on 24 August 1803.

| Year | Master | Owner | Trade | Source & notes |
|---|---|---|---|---|
| 1803 | Grant | Ritchie | London–Madeira; London–Jamaica | LR |

== Fate ==
Flora was last listed in Lloyd's Register 1813.
