= Flora (1798 ship) =

History

Great Britain
- Launched: 1798. Yarmouth
- Fate: Last listed in 1813
- Notes: Hackman conflates this Flora with Flora.

General characteristics
- Tons burthen: 163, or 186 (bm)
- Armament: 6 × 4-pounder guns

Flora was built in 1798 at Yarmouth. She was captured early in her career and quickly recaptured. She traded to the Mediterranean and the Bahamas. She was last listed in 1813.

== Career ==
Flora first appeared in Lloyd's Register (LR) in 1799. In 1799 she had already made a voyage to Barbados and Jamaica and back.

Year	Master	Owner	Trade	Source & notes
1799	Ferguson	Heathfield	London–CGH	LR

On 19 September 1799 Flora, Ferguson, master, sailed for the Cape. On 23 September she was off Folkestone when a French privateer captured her. The privateer took her into Boulogne. She had been carrying a vast number of letters for the troops at the Cape. A British warship cut her out of Boulogne and Flora returned to London, her voyage having been aborted. Her entry in the 1800 issue of LR carried the annotation "captured", but crossed out.

Year	Master	Owner	Trade	Source & notes
1800	Ferguson; A. Evans	Heathfield; Barnes	London–CGH; London–Plymouth	LR

Flora, Evans, master, from Plymouth, went on shore in Apple Bay, near Margate on 4 March 1802, but got off without any material damage, except for the loss of an anchor and cable.

Year	Master	Owner	Trade	Source & notes
1803	A.Evans; A.Christalle	Barnes & Co.	London–Smyrna	LR
1806	Christalle; D.Shaw	Barnes & Co.	London–Smyrna; London–New Providence	LR;small repairs 1806
1813	D.Shaw	Barnes & Co.	London–New Providence	LR;small repairs 1806

== Fate ==
Flora was last listed in 1813.
