= Old Dick (1789 ship) =

1789 British slave ship

History

Great Britain
- Name: Old Dick
- Builder: Bermuda
- Launched: 1789
- Fate: Wrecked c.May 1796

General characteristics
- Tons burthen: 216, or 220 (bm)
- Complement: 15
- Armament: 1794:6 × 3&4&6-pounder guns; 1785:14 × 6-pounder guns
- Notes: Built of Bermuda cedar

Old Dick was launched at Bermuda in 1789. She sailed to England and was lengthened in 1792. From 1792 on she made two full voyages as a Liverpool-based slave ship in the triangular trade in enslaved people. On her second she recaptured two British merchant ships. She was lost in 1796 at Jamaica after having landed her third cargo of captives.

== Career ==
Old Dick first appeared in Lloyd's Register (LR) in 1792 with Threlfall, master, J.Gregson, owner, and trade Liverpool–Africa.

1st voyage transporting enslaved people (1792–1793): Captain Joseph Threlfall sailed from Liverpool on 17 July 1792, bound for West Africa. In 1792, 192 vessels sailed from English ports on voyages to transport enslaved people.

Old Dick started acquiring captives in Africa on 16 September and departed for Grenada on 11 January 1793. She arrived at Grenada on 26 February. She had embarked 349 captives and she delivered 344, for a mortality rate of 1%.

The Slave Trade Act 1788 (Dolben's Act) was the first British legislation passed to regulate the shipping of enslaved people. The Act limited the number of enslaved people that British slave ships could transport, based on the ships' tons burthen. One of the provisions of the act was bonuses for the master (£100) and surgeon (£50) if the mortality among the captives was under 2%; a mortality rate of under 3% resulted in a bonus of half that. Dolben's Act apparently resulted in some reduction in the numbers of captives carried per vessel, and possibly in mortality, though the evidence is ambiguous.

Old Dick sailed from Grenada on 17 March and arrived back at Liverpool on 2 May. She had left Liverpool with 28 crew members and had suffered three crew deaths on the voyage.

2nd voyage transporting enslaved people (1794–1795): With the onset of war with France, Captain James Bird acquired a letter of marque on 14 May 1794. Old Dick sailed from Liverpool on 27 May.

On 28 May 1794 two French frigates captured Martin, Brownrigg, master, sailing from Whitehaven to Antigua. Old Dick recaptured Martin and brought her into Liverpool. Old Dick also recaptured Ilfracombe, which had been sailing from Oporto to Dublin when she was taken. Ilfracombe then arrived in Liverpool too. (Note: Ilfracombe, of 76 tons (bm), had been launched at Ilfracombe in 1788. Ilfracome was carrying 198 pipes of wine, 30 bags of shumac, and 40 quintals of cork.)

Captain James Bird sailed from Liverpool on 27 May 1794. Old Dick arrived in Africa and started to gather her slaves at Loango on 3 August. She sailed from Africa on 21 October and arrived at Grenada on 19 December. She had embarked 350 slaves and she landed 344. She sailed from Grenada on 21 December and arrived back at Liverpool on 26 February 1795. She had left Liverpool with 27 crew members and suffered four crew deaths on the voyage.

| Year | Master | Owner | Trade | Source |
|---|---|---|---|---|
| 1796 | J.Bird | G.Case | Liverpool–Africa | LR; lengthened 1792 & repairs 1795 |

3rd voyage transporting enslaved people (1795–1796): Captain Bird sailed from Liverpool on 26 September 1795. Old Dick acquired captives at Bonny, or possibly Annamaboe She delivered 340 to Kingston on 2 April 1796. Four of her crew of 31 died on her voyage.

== Fate ==
Old Dick was lost on Rocky Point, near Morant Bay, Jamaica, probably in May. Her crew and some materials were saved. (Note: By another account Old Dick, Birdy, master, was wrecked coming to Jamaica with a cargo of slaves, gold dust, and ivory. he slaves and part of her cargo were saved.)

In 1796, some 22 British vessels in the triangular trade were lost. At least two were lost on the homeward-bound legs of their voyages. During the period 1793 to 1807, war, rather than maritime hazards or resistance by the captives, was the greatest cause of vessel losses among British enslaving vessels.
