= French ship L'Alsacien =

At least three ships of the French Navy have been named L'Alsacien or Alsacien:

- French torpedo boat L'Alsacien (1942), a Le Fier-class torpedo boat seized by Germany while on slip and renamed TA3 she was launched in 1942 but never completed
- French torpedo boat L'Alsacien (1946), a Type 39 torpedo boat launched as the German T23 in 1941 she was acquired by France in 1946 and renamed. She was stricken in 1954.
- French frigate L'Alsacien, a Le Normand-class frigate launched in 1957 and stricken in 1981
