= Hired armed cutter Flora (1794) =

HM hired armed cutter Flora served the British Royal Navy under contract from 16 August 1794 until a French privateer captured her on 1 December 1798. Flora was of 15786/94 tons (bm), and was armed with fourteen 4-pounder guns.

Flora, Lieutenant James Reddy, and the hired armed cutter the Stag, captured the French privateer lugger Epervier. (Note: Epervier was an 18-ton "of load" privateer commissioned in Dunkirk in 1793 under Captain Charles Sausted, with 24 men and six guns. In 1796, she was under Jacques-François Leclerc with 2 guns and 18 to 26 men. Demerliac states she was captured in March 1796 off Dunkirk, but mistakes her captor for HMS Flora.) Flora had been reconnoitering Dunkirk when she captured Epervier, which was armed with two 2-pounder guns and six swivel guns. It had sailed from Havre de Grace on 5 May but had captured nothing. Flora arrived in The Downs on 15 May 1796. Lloyd's List reported on 17 May 1796 that the cutter Flora had captured a French privateer of eight guns and 24 men. The lugger was from Havre and Flora sent her into Dover.

Flora shared with Venerable, Repulse, Tamar, Clyde, and the cutter Princess Royal in the proceeds of the capture on 6 September of Hare.

Flora captured Vriendshaft on the 19 February I797.

On 11 February 1798, Flora, under the command of Lieutenant William Yawkins, captured the Spanish schooner Nuestra Senora del Carmen (alias Nimsa). The schooner had been sold at Lisbon.

At some point Flora recaptured the Swedish brig Dorothea Frederica.

Flora sailed to the Mediterranean where she spent time carrying despatches for Admiral Lord Nelson. On 11 September he sent her to Egypt and she returned on 25 October. On 22 November, Flora was part of a squadron under Nelson that left Naples and sailed to Leghorn, arriving on the 28th. The British took possession of the town, as well as two armed polaccas and a merchant vessel. Consequently, she shared with Vanguard, Culloden, Minotaur, and Terpsichorein the proceeds of the capture on 25 November of the Genoese corvettes Tigre and Eguaglianza off Leghorn. The same vessels shared in the proceeds of the capture three days later of the Genoese polacca Nostra Signora del Carmine.

Flora was under the command of Master William Yawkins on 1 December 1798 and en route to the Cape of Good Hope with mail and despatches when a French privateer captured her. On 15 December Nelson, writing from Naples, mentioned that Flora had been lost.
