= HMS Express (1800) =

Brig of the Royal Navy (1800–1813)

History

Great Britain
- Name: HMS Express
- Ordered: 24 May 1800
- Builder: John Randall & Co., Rotherhithe
- Laid down: July 1800
- Launched: 30 December 1800
- Commissioned: January 1801
- Out of service: Laid up in ordinary, 1812.
- Honours and awards: Naval General Service Medal (NGSM) with clasps; "Off the Pearl Rock 13 Decr. 1808"; "Martinique"
- Fate: Sold May 1813

General characteristics
- Class & type: Express-class schooner
- Tons burthen: 178 48/94 (bm)
- Length: 88 ft 0 in (26.8 m) (overall); 72 ft 7 1/2 in (22.1 m) (keel)
- Beam: 21 ft 6 in (6.6 m)
- Depth of hold: 13 ft 1 in (4.0 m)
- Propulsion: Sails
- Sail plan: Schooner; Brig
- Complement: 1800: 30; 1806: 50
- Armament: 1800: 6 × 12-pounder carronades; 1806: 4 × 18–pounder + 6 × 12-pounder carronades + 2 × 4-pounder guns

HMS Express was the name-ship of a class of two schooner-rigged advice-boats of the Royal Navy. Express was launched in 1800 and served until she was sold in 1813. During her career she served in one action and one campaign that in 1847 qualified her surviving crew members for clasps to the Naval General Service Medal.

== Career ==
In January 1801 Lieutenant Robert Sayer commissioned Express for Jersey. Then in August 1802 he sailed her for Trinidad. She spent several years there as a tender with no fixed commanding officer.

In July 1805 Express was in the Leeward Islands under the command of Lieutenant William Swiney. His replacement was Lieutenant George Spearing.

In July and early August of 1806, Express was part of a squadron that included Attentive and Prevost, and that was under the command of Commander Donald Campbell (acting), in HMS Lilly. Together, they supported General Francisco de Miranda, aboard his ship Leander, in his quixotic and unsuccessful attempt to liberate the Captaincy General of Venezuela from Spain rule.

In September 1806, Lieutenant Humphrey Fleming Senhouse was appointed to command Express. At some point Express encountered the French brig Argus, of sixteen 9-pounder guns and 120 men, and a schooner of two 18-pounder guns and 30 men. The encounter was inconclusive as the French broke off the action and sailed away. Express had three men wounded. She had exhausted all her 18-pounder shot. The governor of Martinique, Admiral Villaret Joyeuse, reportedly cashiered Argus's captain for his failure to capture Express.

Admiral Sir Alexander Cochrane assigned Senhouse to patrol the Spanish Main to the west of Caracas, with the assistance of the schooner HMS Ballahoo. The British captured and burnt numerous armed launches and captured many prisoners. Senhouse paroled his prisoners as he was too far from friendly ports to bring them in.

In March 1808, Senhouse joined HMS Belleisle. His replacement as commander of Express was Lieutenant William Dowers.

On 27 February 1807 the sloop Port d'Espagne and Express captured the brig Altrevido, Nichola Valpardo, Master. Ballahoo shared by agreement in the prize money due Express.

On 2 March 1807 Express and Ballahoo captured the sloop Endeavour. three weeks later, on 20 March, Express and Ballahoo captured the sloop Two Friends, Antonio, master.

A year later, on 29 March 1808 Cerberus, in company with Lilly, Pelican, Express, Swinger and Mosambique, sailed from Marie-Galante to attack the island of La Désirade. They arrived on 30 March and sent in a landing party of seamen and marines from the vessels of the squadron, all under the overall command of Captain Sherriff of Lily. As the boats approached they exchanged fire with a battery of 9-pounder guns covering the entrance to the harbour. The ships' guns silenced the battery and the French surrendered.

Express's greatest action commenced on 12 December, when she was part of a squadron under Commander Francis Augustus Collier, in Circe. The squadron also included Stork, Epervier, and Morne Fortunee. The vessels joined to attack the French 16-gun brig Cygne and two schooners off Saint-Pierre, Martinique. Circe sent in her boats, which the French repelled, causing her 56 casualties, dead, wounded and missing.

That evening Amaranthe, under the command of Captain Edward Pelham Brenton, joined Circe and Stork. The next day fire from Amaranthe compelled the crew of Cygne to abandon her and Amaranthe's boats boarded and destroyed the French vessel.

Amaranthe's boats, assisted by boats from Express, boarded the second schooner and set fire to her too. Express lost one man killed and three wounded.

Including the losses in the earlier fighting before Amaranthe arrived, the British had lost some 12 men killed, 31 wounded, and 26 missing (drowned or prisoners) for little gain. Brenton was promoted to Post-captain soon after the battle, with the promotion being back dated to 13 December, the date of the battle. In 1847 the Admiralty authorised the award of the NGSM with the clasp "Off the Pearl Rock 13 Decr. 1808" to all the surviving claimants from the action.

Lieutenant William Malone replaced Dowers. Then in February 1809 Express was in the squadron that took part in the successful invasion of Martinique. In 1847 the Admiralty authorised the NGSM with clasp "Martinique" to all surviving claimants from the campaign.

== Fate ==
Express was laid up in ordinary at Portsmouth in 1812. On 28 April 1813, the Commissioners of the Navy offered the "Express brig, 179 tons" for sale at Portsmouth. She was sold to Messrs. Walters, of Rotherhithe, in May 1813.
