= Barossa (ship) =

Several vessels have been named Barosa (or Barrossa, or Barosa, or Barrossa), initially for the battle of Barrosa (5 March 1811):

- Barrosa (1811 ship) was launched at Cossipore. She sailed to England and then made six voyages for the British East India Company (EIC); during this period she also made one voyage carrying immigrants to South Africa. After the EIC gave up its maritime activities in 1833-1834, Barossa became a transport. She made three voyages transporting convicts to Australia. She was lost in 1847, without loss of life, while transporting coolies from Madras to Jamaica.
- Barrosa (1811 Nantes ship) was launched at Nantes in 1810 under another name. She was purchased in 1811 as a prize, renamed, and her new owners sailed her as a West Indiaman. A French privateer captured and released her. A French privateer captured and released her. A year later an American privateer captured her but the Royal Navy may have recaptured her. She then disappears from readily available records.
- SS Barossa was a cargo ship built in Dundee for the Adelaide Steamship Company in 1938. She was bombed and sunk in 1942 but was salvaged. She was sold in 1946 and renamed Cronulla. Cronulla was scrapped at Hong Kong in 1969 after a typhoon damaged her irreparably.

== See also ==
- HMS Barossa – any one of four vessels of the British Royal Navy
