= HMS Netley (1798) =

Brig of the Royal Navy

History

Great Britain
- Name: HMS Netley
- Namesake: Village of Netley
- Builder: Hobbs & Hellyer, Redbridge
- Acquired: April 1798 by purchase on launch
- Fate: Captured 1806

France
- Name: Duquesne
- Namesake: Abraham Duquesne
- Acquired: 1806 by capture
- Captured: September 1807

United Kingdom
- Name: HMS Unique
- Acquired: September 1807 by capture
- Fate: Expended 1809 in a fire ship attack

General characteristics (Note: All measurements are from Winfield, and apply only to Netley. The change in dimensions due to subsequent modifications is not on record.)
- Tons burthen: 22464/94 (bm)
- Length: 73 ft 6 in (22.40 m) (overall); 54 ft 10 1/2 in (16.726 m) (keel)
- Beam: 27 ft 9 in (8.46 m)
- Depth of hold: 10 ft 10 in (3.30 m)
- Propulsion: Sails
- Complement: Netley:50; Dusquesne:120; Unique: n.a.
- Armament: Netley: 16 × 18-pounder carronades; Duquesne: 16 × 24-pounder carronades, one "26-pounder long gun", and four swivel guns; Unique: 12 cannons

HMS Netley was a ship that was launched in 1798 with an experimental design. During the French Revolutionary Wars she spent some years on the Oporto station, where she captured many small privateers. The French captured her in 1806, early in the Napoleonic Wars. They lengthened her and she became the 17-gun privateer Duquesne. In 1807 the British recaptured her and the Royal Navy returned her to service as the 12-gun gun-brig HMS Unique. She was expended in an unsuccessful fire ship attack at Guadeloupe in 1809.

== Design ==
Netley was built to a design by Sir Samuel Bentham. She was a modified and somewhat enlarged version of Milbrook, a smaller version of his Dart-class vessels. Bentham's designs featured little sheer, negative tumblehome, a large-breadth to length ratio with structural bulkheads, and sliding keels. They were also virtually double-ended.

== French Revolutionary Wars ==
Netley was commissioned in 1798 under the command of Lieutenant Francis Godolphin Bond. Her first recorded prize occurred on 25 September 1798 when she took the French sloop Clementine.

=== 1799 ===
On 1 May 1799, Netley captured Egyptienne, a French privateer schooner. She was pierced for 14 guns but only carried eight, four of which she had thrown overboard while trying to evade capture. She had only 35 men on board, recently taking four neutral vessels as prizes. Netley had recaptured one of these, a galiot carrying a cargo of wine from Oporto. Netley also recaptured an English brig carrying a cargo of provisions from Cork to Oporto when a French privateer lugger had taken her off Viana the day before.

Next, on 14 June during a cruise out of Oporto, Netley recaptured a brig that had been sailing from Lisbon to Oporto when taken. The next day, Netley took possession of a schooner carrying corn. The day after that, Netley took possession of a second schooner carrying corn. All three vessels were part of a Portuguese convoy from Lisbon that had fallen prey to a French privateer. Lastly, Netley burnt a coaster at Vigo and ran a brig ashore a little north of that.

On 14 October, Netley recaptured a brig that had been sailing from Gibraltar carrying brandy. Netley dropped a boat to take possession of the prize, and immediately set out after her captor. Netley was able to prevent the privateer from entering Bayonne, though Netley had to exchange a few shots with the fort there. Netley captured the privateer, which turned out to be a Spanish schooner from Muros called O'Reilly y Los Tres Amigos. The privateer was armed with four carriage guns and four brass 3-pounder swivel guns, and had a crew of 52 men. Because the number of prisoners exceeded the number of men Bond had left aboard Netley, Bond dropped them off at Oporto and turned them over to the Spanish consul there, who gave Bond a receipt for the men.

On 28 November, Netley was off Lisbon when she sent into port several prizes ahead of her. She was towing the packet ship Walsingham, which was delaying her entry. The prizes included two Spanish privateer luggers she had captured, one on the 14th and one that very day, and another lugger that Castor had captured on the 24th within sight of Netley and that Captain Gower of Castor had requested that Bond take with him to port. Bond also reported that he had recaptured two brigs that had been taken while sailing from Newfoundland.

On 22 December, Netley captured Esperance, of Viana. Espereance was a French privateer lugger, formerly a privateer from Guernsey. She was pierced for 12 gun but only mounting five, and had a crew of 36 men.

The next day Netley encountered San Fiorenzo and Captain Sir Henry Neale passed on to Bond the information that three convoys had become dispersed along the Portuguese coast and that the vessels had been unable to get into Douro for the previous 20 days. Weather conditions having improved, Bond therefore decided to sail to intercept any prizes attempting to get into Vigo.

On the morning of 24 December, Netley recaptured the Hamburg brig Catharina, which had been sailing from Oporto to Cork Limerick with a cargo of wine and fruit when she was taken. That night, after a short chase, Netley captured a small Spanish privateer lugger. This was Felicidad, of two guns, eight swivels, and 22 men. Before Netley had finished taking her prisoners on board, she spotted another privateer, and the privateer's prize. At 1 a.m. on 25 January Netley retook the bark Dutchess of Gordon which had been transporting 7,600 quintals of salt fish from Newfoundland to Oporto. By 10 a.m., after a short chase, Netley captured the Spanish privateer schooner St Antonio y Animas (alias Aurora). She was armed with six guns and had a crew of 46 men. At the same time, Netley recaptured the privateer's prize, Venus, which had been carrying shot, lead, tin, staves, and the like from London to Oporto. Venus, Humphries, master, was reported to have arrived at Oporto after her recapture.

On 27 December, Netley recaptured three more vessels. One was the English brig Commerce, which was carrying a cargo of salt fish. (Note: Commerce, Bibbins, master, had been coming from Newfoundland. Commerce, of 184 tons (bm), Ribbins, master, had been launched at Teignmouth in 1797. Her entry in the Register of Shipping for 1800 carried the annotation "Captured".) The second was a Swedish brig that had been carrying iron and deals (fir or pine boards) from Stockholm to Viana before a French lugger had captured her. The third vessel was a Portuguese schooner carrying a cargo of salt. The evening of the next day the weather began to worsen.

=== 1800 ===
On 8 January, Netley had to leave behind near the shore Commerce, which had stayed with her. Commerce had no usable sails, and the wind forced Netley to sail away from the shore. Commerce, Bibbins, master, was again captured. This time her captor sent her into Vigo.

The next day Netley also encountered the West Indiaman Trojan, which had lost much of her rigging and contact with her convoy. She was attempting to reach Lisbon to refit. Netley stayed with her through almost continuous storms until the 21st, and then saw her into port on the 27th.

At some point Netley recaptured Liberty, Bly, master, which a Spanish privateer had captured off Porto Bar. Netley made a cartel of Liberty and sent her into Bayonne. There Bly rejoined her to sail her for Oporto. (Note: Liberty, of 107 tons (bm), had been launched at Yarmouth in 1786. Her master was W.S.Bly, and her owner T.Bly.)

Unfortunately, bad weather cost Netley most of her prizes and some of her crew. Dutchess of Gordon was wrecked near Lisbon. All but one of the people aboard was lost, including Netley's pilot. Two brigs arrived safe, and two others had to take refuge in Vigo, i.e., in an enemy port. The French lugger stranded attempting to cross the bar at Viana, but without loss of life. On 20 February, Netley recaptured the Portuguese vessel Carmo y Diligente.

On 7 March, Netley recaptured a brig from Brazil. Two days later she recaptured a ship from Brazil carrying a cargo of cotton, rice, and the like, and a brig, also from Brazil, with a like cargo. Eight days later, Netley captured the Spanish privateer Pedro Apostle (alias Escariote), of five guns and 37 men.

Next, Netley captured the American brig Nymph on 26 March. Nymph was carrying pilchards from Penzance to Naples. On 18 April Netley captured San Francisco e San Antonio el Lebre.

On 15 May, Netley and the frigate Minerve captured the French privateer cutter Vengeance. Vengeance was armed with 15 guns and had a crew of 132 men. The next day Netley captured another privateer, the Spanish lugger Animas el sola (alias Desquite), or Animas Sola el Desquits. At the end of the month, on 29 May, Netley recaptured the "Hambro ship" Junge Lieppe, which was carrying staves and wheat. Two days later Netley recaptured the French privateer lugger Legere. Legere was armed with three guns, had a crew of 40 men, and was on a cruise from Jean de Luz.

In August, Netley made a particularly valuable capture. On 11 August she captured the Spanish ship Reyna Luisa (or Reina Luisa), which was carrying cocoa, wool and £12,000 in bullion from Montevideo to Corunna.

From 7 to 11 September, Netley escorted a convoy safely from Lisbon to Oporto. Then on the 28th, she captured the Spanish privateer Nostra Senora del Carmen La Confianza, of two guns and 26 men. The lugger Nostra Senora del Carmen La Connianza was on a cruise from Vigo. She was armed with two guns and had a crew of 26 men.

Then on 16 October, Netley recaptured the brig Mary, from Dublin, and the Portuguese government 7-gun lugger Lial Invicta Vianna. A French 14-gun privateer had captured both the day before. A Spanish rowboat had cut Mary out from under the guns of Fort Saint John on 14 October. The Portuguese governor had sent Lial Invicta Vianna to retrieve her when they encountered the French privateer which, after an action of half an hour, had captured the Portuguese lugger. Netley's crew returned Lial Invicta Vianna to his Excellency M. Pedro de Millo free of salvage. Mary had been carrying 169 casks of butter and some coals from Dublin to Oporto.

November yielded three more prizes. On the 8th, Netley captured Spanish privateer schooner St Miguel (alias Alerta), from Ponte Vedra. The privateer was armed with nine guns, 6 and 18-pounders, and had a crew of 65 men. That same day, Netley recaptured her prize, the English brig Hunter, which had been carrying fish from Newfoundland to Lisbon. Netley dropped off her boat to recapture the brig, and sailed up alongside St Miguel, dropped anchor, and captured her without a shot being fired. Lastly, on 18 November Netley sailed from Lisbon and five days later captured the Spanish privateer lugger St Antonio y Animas La Fortuna, of six guns and 34 men.

On 11 December Netley captured St Miguel El Volante, of two guns and 29 men. Then in the next three days Netley retook the brig Speedy, carrying cod fish from Newfoundland, and captured a Spanish coaster carrying wine, and the Spanish privateer schooner Pedro y San Francisco, of three guns and 39 men. These were Bond's last captures. On 11 December he received promotion to commander.

In all, under Bond Netley captured some 45 prizes, including 19 armed privateers. Reina Luisa was valued for purposes of prize money at £24,000. If Bond received the full 3/8 due the captain of the capturing vessel(s), his share would have been £9,000, or an amount equivalent to over 20 years pay for a senior captain (in rank). This would have been in addition to the prize money for all his other captures.

=== 1801 ===
In January Lieutenant James Mien replaced Bond. On 29 January, Netley sailed with the responsibility of protecting a convoy sailing north from Lisbon. On 3 February she encountered four privateers. She was able to capture one after a chase of two hours. The capture privateer was a Spanish lugger called Santa Victoria. Santa Victoria was armed with six guns and had a crew of 26 men. Netley was unable to catch any of the other privateers because of the necessity of protecting her convoy, which had sighted an enemy vessel to windward.

The next month, on 9 February, Netley was nine leagues SW of Oporto when she captured the Spanish privateer lugger St Francisco de Paula. The privateer was armed with two carriage guns and four swivel guns, and had a crew of 31 men. She was on a cruise out of Pontevedra. Two days later, Netley captured the Spanish privateer San Josef (alias Belos), on a cruise out of Corunna. San Josef was armed with four guns and four swivels, and had a crew of 55 men. That same day Netley recaptured a British brig that had been taken while sailing in ballast from Southampton to Oporto, and a British snow, also sailing in ballast, but from London to Oporto. On the 16th, Netley captured the Spanish lugger Nostra Santa del Carmen, sailing with a cargo of wine and sardines from Vigo to Ferrol. Four days later Netley recaptured the snow Edward and Mary, which had been sailing from Oporto to Falmouth with a cargo of beef, pork, and coals.

Next, Netley shared with Constance and Speedwell in the capture on 23 June of the Purissima Concepcion. On 17 October Netley captured the Spanish ship Santissima Trinidada (alias Casualidad.

In early 1802 Netley was in Portsmouth, in ordinary. Lieutenant John Lawrence recommissioned her in May. He then sailed her to the Leeward Island on 17 November.

== Napoleonic Wars ==
On 21 August 1803, Centaur and Netley captured the American ship Fame and her cargo of flour and corn. Then in September, Commodore Samuel Hood went on to take the colonies of Demerara and Essequibo from the Batavian Republic. Netley went ahead with a Mr. Casey, who knew the coast, to reconnoitre and to find boats to carry the troops. Lawrence was able to find 24 boats and have them ready by the time Centaur, Chichester, Hornet, Alligator, and the transport Brilliant arrived.

On 20 September Hornet, Netley and 200 troops entered the Demerara River and took possession of Fort William Frederick. At the capitulation, the British took over the Batavian Republic's sole warship there, Hippomenes. (Note: In March 1812 the troops and seamen of the expedition received a second payment of the proceeds of the capture, this payment amounting to £3,000 in all. In June 1815 there was a final distribution. A first-class share was worth £74 2s 6d; a fifth-class share, that of a seaman, was worth 12s 4 1/4d.)

At some point Lieutenant William Sanders replaced Lawrence. Lawrence then transferred to Hornet. Lieutenant William Autridge of Centaur replaced him. On 19 May 1804 Netley captured a French sloop (name unknown), carrying provisions. In August, Netley captured the French schooner Bellona. She too was carrying provisions.

In October 1804, or perhaps earlier, Lieutenant William Carr, of Eclair, replaced Lawrence, who transferred to Serapis. On 4 October, Netley captured a small privateer, the French felucca San Benita, of one gun and 28 men.

In June 1805 Netley was under the command of Lieutenant Richard Harward, albeit briefly. While under his command she was in company with Barbadoes as they escorted a convoy of 15 merchant vessels back to Britain. They had the misfortune on 8 June to encounter a Franco-Spanish fleet under Admiral Villeneuve. The two British warships managed to escape, but Villeneuve's fleet captured the entire convoy, valued at some five million pounds. He sent the convoy to Guadeloupe under the escort of the frigate Sirène. On her way Sirène encountered several British frigates. She escaped after burning the merchantmen.

== Capture and recapture ==
On 17 December 1806, the French frigate Thétis and the corvette Sylphe captured Netley. Netley, again under the command of Lieutenant William Carr, had sighted two strange sails. Believing them, from their appearance, to be a French privateer and her prize. Netley started to distance herself when the two identified themselves as a frigate and a sloop. They opened fire and during the engagement Netley had one man killed. More critically, she started taking on water, and could not bring her guns to bear, the gun ports on the lee side being under water.

The French sold Netley and she became the privateer Duquesne. Less than nine months later, on 23 September 1807, HMS Blonde captured Dusquesne. Two days earlier, Duquesne had captured the brig Jassyes, of Dublin, which had been sailing to Barbados in ballast.

Captain Volant Vashon Ballard of Blonde remarked that the French had performed a complete repair on Netley, including lengthening her. He recommended that she be taken back into the Royal Navy. By this time the Royal Navy had commissioned a recently captured French privateer under the name Netley, so Duquesne became the 12-gun gun-brig HMS Unique.

== HMS Unique ==
Lieutenant Murray commissioned Unique at Antigua. Lieutenant Thomas Fellowes took command of Unique on 13 November 1808.

On 11 November, Circe, Epervier, and Amaranthe captured Intrepid. Nine days later, Amaranthe, Circe, Cherub, Epervier and Unique captured the American ships Bonetta and Mary and Allen. Prize money for Intrepid and Bonetta was paid in 1814, and 1839. (Note: A first–class share for the capture of Intrepid and Bonetta was worth £8 7s 8d; a sixth-class share, that of an ordinary seaman, was worth 3s 2d.)

In April 1809, a strong French squadron arrived at the Îles des Saintes, south of Guadeloupe. There they were blockaded until 14 April, when a British force under Major-General Frederick Maitland and Captain Philip Beaver in Acasta, invaded and captured the islands. Unique was among the naval vessels that shared in the proceeds of the capture of the islands. (Note: Henry Abbott, the prize agent for a number of the vessels involved, went bankrupt. In May 1835 there was a final payment of a dividend from his estate. A first-class share was worth 10s 2 3/4d; a sixth-class share, that of an ordinary seaman, was worth 1d. Seventh-class (landsmen) and eighth-class (boys) shares were fractions of a penny, too small to pay.)

Unique was also among the many vessels that shared in the proceeds of the capture on 17 April 1809 of the French ship D'Hautpoul. (Note: A first-class share was worth £44 1s 7 1/2d; a sixth-class share was worth 6s 6d.)

== Fate ==
On 21 May 1809, Fellowes and Unique were at Basse Terre as part of a squadron under Captain Philip Beaver of Acasta. They sighted a French schooner sheltering under the protection of some guns, and recognized the vessel as one that had sailed under their protection for several days while flying the Swedish flag. Beaver sent in Unique and Julia to try and cut her out, but she was stuck fast on shore. Fellowes then led a party of 24 men ashore to spike an enemy battery's guns despite being opposed by a large French regular force; in the attack one man was killed, a midshipman from Julia, and seven men were seriously wounded. Of the remaining men, all but Fellowes were at least lightly wounded; he was the only unwounded man to return from the raid.

In May 1809, British ships chased two French frigates, armed en flûte and bringing supplies to Martinique, into the Basse Terre roads. The British set up a blockade, trapping the French frigate Félicité and Furieuse in their shelter. By this time Unique, was in poor condition - in particular she was leaky, in part from the constant firing of her guns at shore batteries. The decision was made to use her as a fireship in an attempt to destroy one or both of the French vessels. On 31 May she was sent in during the evening but the mission failed. Having been lightened of most of her stores, Unique was vulnerable to gusts of wind, and she grounded not far from one of her targets. Fellowes then set fire to a train of explosives to prevent her falling into French hands.

On 16 September Fellowes received a promotion to Commander. Félicité and Furieuse escaped some time later, only to end up being captured: Félicité by Latona on 7 June 1809, Furieuse by HMS Bonne Citoyenne on 5 July 1809.
