= HMS Morne Fortunee (1806) =

British Royal Naval ship formerly French privateer Regulus

History

United Kingdom
- Name: HMS Morne Fortunee
- Operator: Royal Navy
- Acquired: 1804 by capture of a prize
- Honours and awards: Naval General Service Medal (NGSM) with the clasps; Curacoa 1 Jany. 1807; Off The Pearl Rock 13 Decr. 1808
- Fate: Foundered 9 January 1809

General characteristics
- Tons burthen: 184 (bm)
- Propulsion: Sails
- Sail plan: Brig
- Complement: 60

HMS Morne Fortunee was the French privateer Regulus that British Royal Navy captured in 1804. In 1806 the Royal Navy commissioned her. She captured some small privateers and took part in a number of other engagements. She foundered in 1809.

== Capture ==
At 10am on 13 December 1804, the frigate HMS Princess Charlotte was four leagues west of Cape Antonio when she sighted an unknown brig. After a chase of seven hours southward, Princess Charlotte caught up with her quarry at 30°50′N 85°32′W. The brig surrendered after her pursuer had fired four or five shots. The quarry was the French privateer Regulus, out of Guadaloupe. She was pierced for 14 guns but had only 11 on board, having thrown two overboard during the chase. She had a crew of 88 men under the command of Citizen Jacque Mathieu. Captain F.F. Gardner of Princess Charlotte described Regulus as "a very fine Vessel" that "sails remarkably well" and is "perfectly adapted for His Majesty's Service".

== Royal Navy ==
Lieutenant John Rorie commissioned Morne Fortunee in 1806.

On 6 April Morne Fortunee recaptured Industry and took her into Port Royal where she was to unload, having sprung a leak. Industry, Galt, master, had sailed from Port Royal on 2 April for Dublin with the fleet, but a French privateer had captured her on the 6th and taken most of her crew and some valuable articles.

After a chase of two hours off Cape Beata on the island of Hispaniola, Morne Fortunee on 16 May 1806 captured the French privateer Luni. Luni, of two guns and 47 men, was four days out of San Domingo but had not captured anything.

On 3 June Morne Fortunee drove the Spanish letter of marque schooner Aimable Jenette ashore between Saona Island and Cape Euganna. It was impossible to get her off so Rorie sent his boats in to destroy her. Aimable Jenette had been armed with two guns and had had a crew of 20 men.

In June Lieutenant John Brown replaced Rorie. On 18 June Brown and Morne Fotunee took the French privateer schooner Hope of St. Pierre's, Martinique. Brown has sighted a suspicious sail and gave chase, and after two hours was able to come up with and capture her. Hope had lost her main-mast and foretop-mast in am earlier squall. She was armed with four guns and had a crew of 44. She had been out for seven days but had taken nothing.

In November Lloyd's List reported that Morne Fortunee had detained Attempt, of and from Salem, Massachusetts, which had been sailing to Martinique with naval stores. Morne Fortunee took Attempt into Saint Lucia.

Lieutenant J.J. Rorie replaced Brown in command of Morne Fortunee during 1807.

On 1 January 1807 the frigates HMS Latona, Anson, Arethusa, and Fisgard captured the Dutch island of Curacao. Morne Fortunee was not mentioned in the letter describing the action. However, Lieutenant Rorie claimed a share of the prize money arising from the capture, a claim that was disputed. By 1849 when the Admiralty awarded the NGSM for the action, Morne Fortunee and Rorie were listed together with the four frigates.

On 13 January Morne Fortunee captured Nuestra Senora del Carmen.

On 8 July Rorie observed a Spanish privateer schooner near Point Tunacas and after a chase of about three hours, succeeded in driving on shore. Rorie immediately opened fire and succeeded in destroying his quarry. She turned out to be Babillon, of two 6-pounder guns and 45 men. She was three days out of Coro but had not captured anything. Rorie reported a "particular Satisfaction" at having destroyed Babillon as she had been a "considerable Annoyance to the Curacoa Trade."

While off the south side of the Pedro Bank, Morne Fortunee gave chase to a Spanish felucca. After a chase of 24 hours, Morne Fortunee captured Santo Christo, a letter of marque armed with one long 12-pounder and with 15 men on board. She had been sailing from Cuba for Portobelo, Colón.

On 27 March the boats of Morne Fortunee joined those of Ulysses, Castor, and Hippomenes in an attempt to cut out the 16-gun French brig Griffon at Marin, Martinique. They succeeded in capturing a battery but were driven back empty handed, having suffered heavy casualties from the brig's fire.

On 18 May Morne Fortunee captured a letter of marque schooner.

On 12 December Morne Fortunee, again under the command of Lieutenant John Brown, discovered the French 16-gun brig Cygne and two schooners off the Pearl Rock, Saint-Pierre, Martinique.

Morne Fortunee joined the frigate HMS Circe, the ship-sloop Stork, the brig-sloop Epervier, and the advice boat Express in an action against the squadron. The British suffered heavy casualties. The next day HMS Amaranthe arrived and the British eventually succeeded in destroying Cygne. In all, the British lost some 12 men killed, 31 wounded, and 26 missing (drowned or prisoners) for little gain. Morne Fortunee suffered no losses.

Cygne was armed with 18 guns and carried a crew of 140 men. She had been carrying flour, guns and cartridge paper for the relief of Martinique. The French schooners were armed and were carrying flour. In 1847 the Admiralty authorized the award of the NGSM with the clasp "Off The Pearl Rock 13 Decr. 1808" to the then living survivors of the battle.

Morne Fortunee shared with Captain, Pompee, and Amaranthe in the prize money pool of £772 3s 3d for the capture of Frederick on 30 December 1808. This money was paid in June 1829.

== Fate ==
Morne Fortunee was off Martinique on 9 January 1809 when a squall came up and overset her. Lieutenant Brown and 40 of her crew drowned. Only the ship's clerk and 18 men were saved.
