= HMS Circe (1804) =

Frigate of the Royal Navy

History

United Kingdom
- Name: HMS Circe
- Ordered: 16 March 1804
- Builder: Plymouth Dockyard
- Laid down: June 1804
- Launched: 17 November 1804
- Commissioned: November 1804
- Honours and awards: Naval General Service Medal (NGSM) with clasps; "Off the Pearl Rock 13 Decr. 1808"; "Martinique"
- Fate: Sold on 20 August 1814

General characteristics
- Class & type: 32-gun fifth-rate Thames-class frigate
- Tons burthen: 67025/94 (bm)
- Length: 127 ft (38.7 m) (overall); 106 ft 10 7/8 in (32.6 m) (keel)
- Beam: 34 ft 4 in (10.5 m)
- Depth of hold: 11 ft 9 in (3.6 m)
- Complement: 220
- Armament: Upper deck: 26 × 12-pounder guns; QD: 8 × 24-pounder carronades; Fc: 4 × 24-pounder carronades

HMS Circe was a Royal Navy 32-gun fifth-rate frigate, built by Master Shipwright Joseph Tucker at Plymouth Dockyard, and launched in 1804. She served in the Caribbean during the Napoleonic Wars, and participated in an action and a campaign for which in 1847 in the Admiralty authorised the issuance of the Naval General Service Medal with clasps. The action, off the Pearl Rock, near Saint-Pierre, Martinique, was a debacle that cost Circe dearly. However, she also had some success in capturing privateers and a French brig. She was sold in 1814.

== Service ==
Circe entered service in November 1804 under Captain Jonas Rose. She then began operating off Portugal. On 1 March 1805 she captured the Spanish privateer schooner Fama off Porto. Fama was armed with four brass guns and had a crew of 62 men. She had left Vigo eight days earlier but had not yet taken any prizes. Circe's crew received headmoney for the 62 men in 1829. (Note: A first-class share was worth £91 15s 0d; a fifth-class share, that of a seaman, was worth 6s 8 1/2d.)

Next, on 21 June, Circe captured the privateer Constance in the Leeward Islands. Constance was armed with 10 guns and had a crew of 75 men. She was just out of Guadeloupe. However, she may have been the same Constance that Circe had earlier captured off the coast of Spain. The Admiralty took her in as the schooner Maria. On 9 May Circe and Epervier captured Charles. Then on 11 September Circe was one of several British warships that shared in the capture of Hiram.

West Indies: In 1806, command passed to Hugh Pigot, who took Circe to the West Indies. On 9 December Circe captured Belle Eliza. (Note: The prize money for petty officers amounted to £60 16s 2 1/2d each, while that for seaman was £12 8s 9d. This compares with monthly pay for a seaman of 1s per day; the prize money would then have represented 248 days' wages.)

On 2 January 1807 Circe's boats took the privateer Creole, of one gun and 28 men. On 5 April she took Austerlitz after an 18-hour pursuit. Austerlitz was armed with eighteen 6-pounder guns and had a crew of 125 men. Pigot reported that "This Vessel has done more Mischief to the Trade than any other from Guadaloupe during the War". The British had chased her several times without catching her and she would have escaped this time too had she not sprung her main topsail-yard and fore-top-gallant mast. (Note: A first-class share of the prize money was worth £34 10s 1 1/2d; a fifth-class share was worth 3s 8 1/4d.) Then The Royal Navy took Austerlitz into service as HMS Pultusk.

Next, Circe was among the British ships sharing in the capture on 20 October 1807 of the Danish schooner Danske Patriot.

In December Circe was part of the squadron under Admiral Sir Alexander Cochrane that captured the Danish islands of St Thomas on 22 December and Santa Cruz on 25 December. The Danes did not resist and the invasion was bloodless.

In 1808 Circe participated in the blockade of Guadeloupe. In March Pigot took command of a landing party made up of seamen and marines from Circe, Cerberus and Camilla. They captured Marie Galante after having met no resistance. Neither side suffered any casualties. (Note: A first-class share of the prize money paid in 1825 was worth £311 0s 5d; a fifth-class share, that of an able seaman, was worth £1 13s 3 1/2d.) At some point Circe came under the command of Commander Charles Kerr (acting).

Then on 31 October 1808 Circe encountered a French brig near Diamond Rock. At Circe's approach the brig took shelter under the guns of a battery. Still, after an engagement of no more than 15 minutes, Circe captured the French brig Palinure, which was under the command of M. Fourniers. Palinure was armed with fourteen 24-pounder carronades and two 6-pounder guns. She had 79 men aboard, most of whom were troops from the 83rd Regiment. She had lost seven killed and eight wounded; Circe had lost one man killed and one wounded. The guns of the battery were so much higher than the vessels beneath them that they could not bring their guns to bear and fired few, if any shots. Earlier that month Palinure had recaptured the Cruizer-class brig-sloop Carnation.

On 11 November, Circe, Epervier, and Amaranthe captured Intrepid. Nine days later, Amaranthe, Circe, Cherub, Epervier and Unique captured the American ships Bonetta and Mary and Allen. Prize money for Intrepid and Bonetta was paid in 1814, and 1839. (Note: A first–class share for the capture of Intrepid and Bonetta was worth £8 7s 8d; a sixth-class share, that of an ordinary seaman, was worth 3s 2d.)

Off the Pearl Rock: Circe's greatest action commenced on 12 December 1808, when under Commander Francis Augustus Collier, Circe was in charge of a squadron that included Stork, Epervier, Morne Fortunee, and Express. The vessels joined to attack the French 16-gun brig Cygne and two schooners off Saint-Pierre, Martinique. Circe sent in her boats, which the French repelled, causing her 56 casualties, dead, wounded and missing.

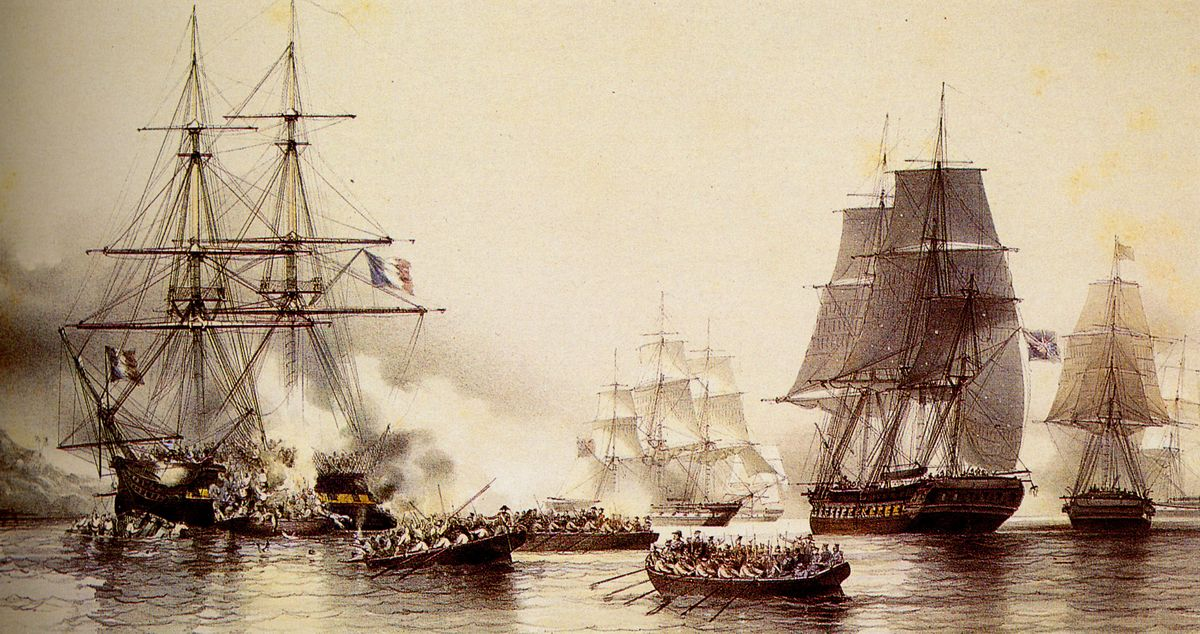
Cygne fights off the British squadron, painting by Auguste Étienne François Mayer

That evening Amaranthe, under the command of Captain Edward Pelham Brenton, joined Circe and Stork. The next day fire from Amaranthe compelled the crew of Cygne to abandon her and Amaranthe's boats boarded and destroyed the French vessel. For her part Amaranthe lost one man killed and five wounded due to fire from shore batteries. One schooner ran ashore and was destroyed.

Amaranthe's boats, assisted by boats from the schooner Express, boarded the second schooner and set fire to her too. This expedition cost Amaranthe her sailing master, Joshua Jones, who was severely wounded. The other British vessels that contributed boats also had casualties. Including the losses in the earlier fighting before Amaranthe arrived, the British had lost some 12 men killed, 31 wounded, and 26 missing (drowned or prisoners) for little gain. Brenton was promoted to Post-captain soon after the battle, with the promotion being back dated to 13 December, the date of the battle. In 1847 the Admiralty authorised the award of the NGSM with the clasp "Off the Pearl Rock 13 Decr. 1808".

Circe, Nimrod, and Cygnet shared in the proceeds of the American schooner Minerva, forward from Saint Christoper.

1809: Circe was in company with Wolverine, Pompee, and Captain when Wolverine captured the French brig Josephine on 15 January 1809. Then in February Circe was in the squadron that took part in the successful invasion of Martinique. In 1847 the Admiralty authorised the NGSM with clasp "Martinique" to all surviving claimants from the campaign.

On 31 March Circe and Narcissus captured Frederique.

In April 1809, a strong French squadron arrived at the Îles des Saintes, south of Guadeloupe. There they were blockaded until 14 April, when a British force under Major-General Frederick Maitland and Captain Philip Beaver in Acasta, invaded and captured the islands. Circe was among the naval vessels that shared in the proceeds of the capture of the islands. (Note: The prize agent for a number of the vessels involved, Henry Abbott, went bankrupt. In May 1835 there was a final payment of a dividend from his estate. A first-class share was worth 10s 2 3/4d; a sixth-class share, that of an ordinary seaman, was worth 1d. Seventh-class (landsmen) and eighth-class (boys) shares were fractions of a penny, too small to pay.)

Circe was also among the vessels sharing in the prize money from Pompee's capture of the D'Hautpoul on 17 April.

In July, Captain Edward Woolcombe took command. Circe was among the vessels listed as having participated in the ill-fated Walcheren Campaign that took place between 30 July and 10 August. She shared in the proceeds of the property captured at Walcheren and the adjacent islands in the Scheldt.

Woolcombe sailed Circe to the Mediterranean on 17 February 1810. She remained there in 1811 before returning to Portsmouth in July 1812.

Circe sailed for the Leeward Islands on 15 November. There, in company with Forester, she took the American privateer Lovely Lass on 14 May 1813 after a nineteen-hour chase. Lovely Lass was under the command of Mr. John Smith, an officer in the American navy. She had been armed with five guns but had thrown four overboard during the chase. She had a crew of 60 men and had been out for forty days without having made any captures. A later report gave her tonnage as 80 tons and her crew as 73 men. She was from Wilmington and Circe sent her to Kingston.

Four days later Circe captured the American schooner William, of 145 tons and 7 men. She was carrying staves and lumber from Boston to Porto Bello and Circe sent her too to Kingston. The prize court restored William to her owners and deducted certain expenses of the detention from Circe's prize money for Lovely Lass.

== Fate ==
In 1814 Circe went into ordinary at Portsmouth. The Principal Officers and Commissioners of His Majesty's Navy offered the "Circe, of 32 guns and 670 tons", lying at Portsmouth, for sale on 11 August 1814. The buyer had to post a bond of £3,000, with two guarantors, that they would break up the vessel within a year of purchase. She was sold on 20 August 1814 for £1,900.
