= HMS Cherub (1806) =

Sloop of the Royal Navy

History

United Kingdom
- Name: HMS Cherub
- Ordered: 19 November 1805
- Builder: John King, Dover
- Laid down: January 1806
- Launched: 27 December 1806
- Honours and awards: Naval General Service Medal with clasps: "Martinique"; "Guadaloupe"; "Cherub 28 March 1814"
- Fate: Sold, 1820

General characteristics
- Class & type: Cormorant-class 18-gun sloop
- Tons burthen: 423 79/94 (bm)
- Length: 108 ft 4 in (33.0 m) (overall); 90 ft 9 1/2 in (27.7 m) (keel)
- Beam: 29 ft 7 1/2 in (9.0 m)
- Depth of hold: 9 ft 0 in (2.7 m)
- Armament: Upper deck: 16 × 32-pounder carronades; QD: 6 × 18-pounder carronades; Fc: 2 × 6-pounder chase guns + 2 × 18-pounder carronades

HMS Cherub was an 18-gun Royal Navy Cormorant-class sloop built in Dover in 1806. She participated in two major campaigns in the West Indies during the Napoleonic Wars, and one major engagement in the Pacific during the War of 1812, all each of which earned her crews clasps to the Naval General Service Medal. The Navy sold her in 1820.

== Career ==
Commander John Ravenshaw commissioned Cherub in April for the North Sea. Cherub is listed among the vessels qualifying for prize money arising out of the battle of Copenhagen. (Note: An able seaman's share of the prize money was worth £3 8s.) On the way there, Cherub and Procris detained the Danish ship Neptunus on 30 August. Cherub sent Neptune (or Neptunus), which had been sailing from Stockholm to Holstein, into Sheerness. Slightly earlier, she supported the Swedes at the defence of Stralsund and Rügen.

On 29 February 1808 Cherub sailed for the Leeward Islands. From April to mid-June 1808 Cherub and Nimrod cruised in company, and agreed to share any prizes they captured. Around 9 May Cherub captured the privateer schooner Vaillante, Dubois, master, which was armed with swivel guns and small arms. Her crew abandoned her and escaped ashore, leaving behind one man who was sick and who died the next day. Cherub and Nimrod then used the schooner as a tender. On 17 May Nimrod captured a Spanish schooner carrying hides, cocoa, and indigo. She was the Esther, sailing from La Guayra to Teneriffe. Lastly, on 22 May, Cherub and Nimrod jointly captured a Spanish letter of marque brig after a brief exchange of fire when the British sent in a boarding party in boats after her crew had run her ashore. She was armed with two guns and four howitzers but her crew abandoned her before the boarding party arrived. She had been carrying a cargo of cocoa from Cumano to Barcelona when the British intercepted her. The British were able to retrieve her, though not without difficulty. Nimrod then took the prizes into St Thomas. There the estimates were that the brig's cargo was worth about $20,000, and the Spanish schooner about $1200. (Note: In April 1808 John Augustine Waller was appointed surgeon aboard Nimrod. He kept a diary, which provides a full and fascinating account of the period during which Nimrod and Cherub sailed in company. A brief report in the London Gazette of a letter from Tucker misnames Nimrod as the cutter Nimble. Other than that it provides few details, some of which are wrong.)

On 20 November Amaranthe, Circe, Cherub, Epervier, and Unique participated in the capture of Bonetta, Intrepid, and Mary and Allen. The last prize money was paid in 1839. (Note: A first-class share of the distribution for the Mary and Ellen was worth £3 17s 8 1/2d; a sixth-class share, that of an ordinary seaman, was worth 1s 6d.) Prize money for Intrepid and Bonetta was paid in 1814, and 1839. (Note: A first–class share for the capture of Intrepid and Bonetta was worth £8 7s 8d; a sixth-class share, that of an ordinary seaman, was worth 3s 2d.) In December Commander Thomas Tudor Tucker transferred from Epervier to take command of Cherub.

On 23 January 1809 Captain William Maude of Jason returned to his station off Basse-Terre, Guadeloupe, where he had left Cherub to watch the French frigate that was taking shelter there.

Cherub then took part in the invasion of Martinique as part of the force under Vice-Admiral Sir Alexander Cochrane and Lieutenant-General George Beckwith, who collected 29 ships and 10,000 men. Cherub and Pelorus carried a detachment of troops from the 63rd Regiment of Foot which they disembarked at Corbet and which marched on St Pierre. The British force overwhelmed the French defenders at Martinique in February. Ultimately, 42 British warships shared in the prize money for Martinique. In 1847 the Admiralty awarded the Naval General Service Medal (NGSM) with clasp "Martinique" to all surviving claimants from the campaign.

In early June 1809 Cherub and Julia sailed into the anchorage at Basse-Terre to cut out two French frigates lying there under the protection of a fort and some batteries. As they sailed in they were subject to fire from shore batteries, which had no effect. The wind suddenly failed the British vessels, which were nevertheless able to extricate themselves from the situation with no losses or damage, but no success either.

On 18 June Latona and Cherub captured one of the French frigates, Félicité. At the time of her capture, Félicité was armed with only 14 guns, but had 174 men on board. She had left Guadeloupe in company with another frigate and was sailing to France with colonial produce. The second frigate escaped through superior sailing despite Cherub having conducted a long chase. HMS Bonne Citoyenne captured the second frigate, Furieuse, on 5 July 1809. Latona and Cherub shared the prize money with the other vessels that had formed the blockade of the Saintes, Amaranthe, Blonde, Curieux, Haughty, Julia, and Morne Fortunee.

Next, Cherub took part in the invasion of Guadeloupe in early 1810. This time 50 vessels shared in the prize money. (Note: A naval first-class share of the prize money was worth £113 3s 1 3/4d; a sixth-class share, that of an ordinary seaman, was worth £1 9s 5 1/4d.) In 1847 the Admiralty awarded the Naval General Service Medal (NGSM) with clasp "Guadaloupe" to all surviving claimants from the campaign.

On 1 August 1811 Tucker received promotion to post captain. Cherub was reclassed as a sixth rate to permit him to continue in command.

Cherub remained on the Leeward Islands station until 3 July 1812, when she returned to England for a refit. On this voyage she convoyed some 70 to 80 vessels, or 96. Cherub arrived in September and the crew received one month's leave; apparently all returned to duty, even though they had been away from Britain for some years and expected to sail again for more years abroad. A newspaper report dated 9 October from Halifax reported that Prince of Asturias, from St Mary's, Straker, master, which Cherub had recaptured, had arrived there. The account did not specify either the date of recapture nor arrival.

On 19 December 1812 Cherub left Cork with a convoy of 12 vessels, eight for Brazil, two for Buenos Aires, and one for the South Seas. Several separated and on 12 January USS Chesapeake captured Volunteer and the next day another vessel from the convoy. Still, on 24 January 1813 Cherub still had seven vessels with her.

Cherub sailed from Rio de Janeiro on 8 July in company with Phoebe and Racoon, sailing around Cape Horn.

The Royal Navy had been under pressure from the Montreal–based North West Company, who were agitating for them to capture the base of their rival, the Pacific Fur Company. At the Galapagos Islands, Racoon continued on to attack American fur traders at Fort Astoria on the Columbia River, while Phoebe and Cherub remained to search for the frigate USS Essex, which had been attacking the British whaling fleet in the Pacific.

=== Capture of Essex ===
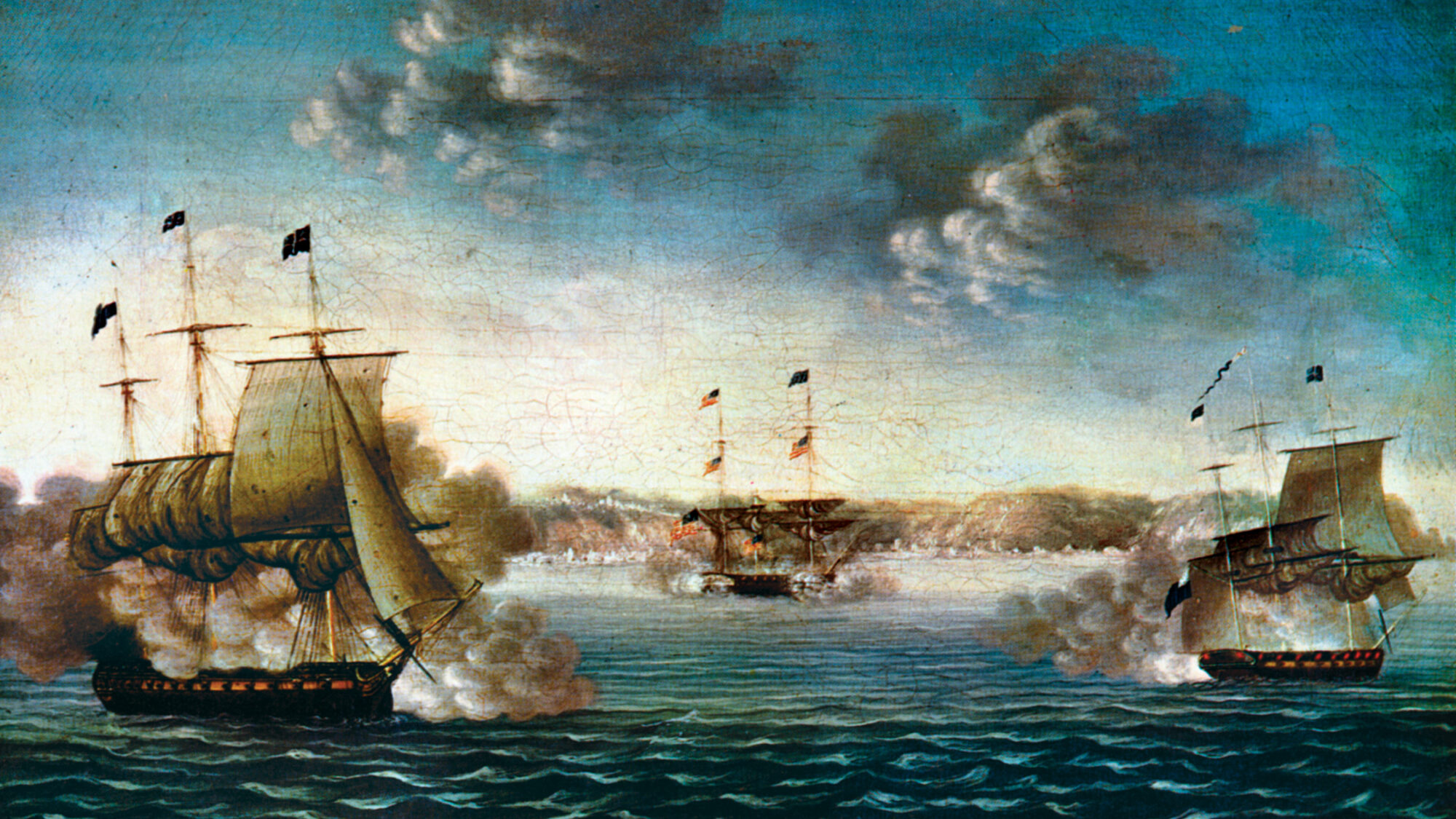
c. 1819 painting of Cherub (right) at the Battle of Valparaíso

On 8 February 1814, Phoebe and Cherub found Essex at Valparaíso. They waited off the port for Essex to come out. On the afternoon of 28 March, Essex sailed but she lost her main topmast and anchored near the shore. Phoebe and Cherub also anchored and opened fire. The British were armed with long guns, which were more effective at a longer range than the American armament of carronades. As the British anchored out of effective range of the American carronades, the battle was very one-sided and lasted for an hour until Captain David Porter of Essex struck his colours with 23 dead and 42 wounded on board. On the British ships only five were killed. Phoebe and Cherub also captured Essex's tender, Essex Junior, which they then used as a cartel to transport their prisoners to New York. In 1847 the Admiralty awarded the NGSM with clasps "Cherub 28 March 1814" and "Phoebe 28 March 1814" to all surviving claimants from the battle.

On 31 May Phoebe and Essex set sail for England, finally anchoring in Plymouth sound on 13 November. The Admiralty repaired Essex, taking her into service as HMS Essex. (Note: A first-class share of a portion of the prize money for Essex was worth £619 17s; a sixth-class share, that of an ordinary seaman, was worth £7 13s 6d. The second distribution occurred on 24 October 1815 for which the value of a first-class share was worth £299 2s 9d; a sixth-class share was worth £3 2s.)

In mid-April Cherub was at Valparaíso taking on supplies. She was planning to sail to the Marquesas Islands in search of the whalers that Essex had captured.

On 12 June, near the Sandwich Islands, Cherub recaptured Sir Andrew Hammond (or Sir Andrew Hamond); five days later she captured Charon. Sir Andrew Hamond was a whaler that Porter had captured and left at Nuka Hiva, together with other captured whalers, including Greenwich and the former British letter-of-marque whaler, USS Seringapatam, the whole being under the command of Lieutenant John M. Gamble USMC. When Gamble made preparations to leave the island, many of his party mutinied. Gamble and seven men (four unfit for duty) escaped and sailed Sir Andrew Hammond 2500 miles before they had the misfortune to meet up with Cherub. (Note: A first-class share of the salvage money was worth £72 13s 5d; a sixth-class share, that of an ordinary seaman, was worth 16s 6d. Cherub shared the money with Phoebe by prior agreement.)

On 15 January 1815 Cherub and Racoon left Rio de Janeiro, escorting a convoy that included the storeships Prévoyante and Serapis, and seven merchantmen, including Sir Andrew Hammond. They left Pernambuco on 6 March, and Cherub arrived at Portsmouth on 5 May.

== Post-war ==
Cherub was fitted for sea at Portsmouth between August and October 1816. Captain William Fisher commissioned her in August for the West Africa Squadron.

On 17 January 1817, Cherub captured the Spanish slave ship Esperanza. (Note: A first-class share for Esperanza was worth £1166 9s 2 1/4d; a sixth-class share was worth £10 4s 7 1/2d.) On 5 March, Bann captured the slave ship Temerario; Cherub shared the prize money for Temerario with Bann. (Note: A first-class share for Temerario was worth £155 14s 8 1/4d; a sixth-class share was worth £1 3s 4 3/4d.)

In May 1817 Cherub was at Cape Coast Castle, having come from London via Jamaica. In July she was back at Jamaica from Africa. She arrived back at Plymouth on 11 October.

In October 1817 she was recommissioned under Captain George Wicken Willes, who was appointed to her 3 October 1817 while she was fitting for Africa. On 15 May 1818, Cherub captured the Spanish slaver Josefa (or Joseffa, or Josepha), Buenaventura Llarena, master, off Cape Appollonia. She had purchased 45 slaves, of whom some 35 were aboard, ten having been taken off shortly before Cherub captured her. Cherub sent her to Jamaica, then Havana, and finally back to Freetown, Sierra Leone, arriving 26 November. There Josefa, which was in a leaky state, sank on 24 May 1819. She sank long after the 28 surviving slaves had been brought ashore. Although the vessel was clearly engaged in the illegal slave trade, she sank before the court condemned her. Willes had acted without having received instructions under the Treaty with Spain for the Suppression of Slave Trade and the seizure was not made under the Slave Trade Convention. The owner(s) sued Willes for the loss of their vessel and her cargo, winning a judgement of £21,180, which ruined Willes. An accounting of the costs and revenues of the colony at Sierra Leone shows £6740 14s 6d in income from "Captain Willis of H.M.S. Cherub" for an illegal capture.

Cherub was back in Portsmouth on 5 October 1818, having sailed from Jamaica on 5 August and Havana on 15 September.

== Fate ==
Cherub was sold to Mr. Holmes for £940 on 13 January 1820.
