= HMS Amaranthe (1804) =

Brig-sloop of the Royal Navy

History

United Kingdom
- Name: HMS Amaranthe
- Ordered: 15 October 1803
- Builder: John Dudman, Deptford, London
- Launched: 20 November 1804
- In service: January 1805
- Honours and awards: Naval General Service Medal (NGSM): "Off the Pearl Rock 13 Decr. 1808"; "Martinique"; "Guadaloupe"
- Fate: Sold in 1815

General characteristics
- Class & type: Cruizer-class brig-sloop
- Tons burthen: 38621/94 (bm)
- Length: 100 ft (30.5 m) (gundeck); 77 ft 2 1/2 in (23.5 m) (keel)
- Beam: 30 ft 8 in (9.3 m)
- Depth of hold: 12 ft 9 in (3.9 m)
- Sail plan: Brig-sloop
- Complement: 121
- Armament: 16 × 32-pounder carronades; 2 × 6-pounder chase guns

HMS Amaranthe was an 18-gun Royal Navy Cruizer-class brig-sloop built by John Dudman at Deptford Wharf and launched in 1804. She served in the Caribbean, taking part in an action and two campaigns that gained those members of her crew that survived until 1847 the NGSM. She was sold in 1815.

== Service ==
Amaranthe entered service in January 1805 under Commander Edward Pelham Brenton. She then deployed to the North Sea. On 2 January 1806 she captured Juno. Amaranthe captured Hoffnung at the commencement of hostilities with Prussia.

On 3 September 1807, Amaranthe captured Louisa Wilhelmina.

Amaranthe sailed for the Leeward Islands on 20 April 1808. After joining a squadron gathered off Barbados for the invasion of Martinique, Amaranthe participated in blockading the French West Indian islands. On 11 November, Amaranthe was in company with Circe when Circe captured Ruthy. That same day, Amaranthe, together with Circe and Epervier captured the American vessel Intrepid. Nine days later the same three British vessels, together with Unique, participated in the capture of Mary and Allen. Prize money was paid in 1838. On 20 November Amaranthe, Circe, Cherub, Eperviere, and Unique participated in the capture of Bonetta. Prize money was paid in 1814, and 1839. (Note: A first–class share for the capture of Intrepid and Bonetta was worth £8 7s 8d; a sixth-class share, that of an ordinary seaman, was worth 3s 2d.)

On 13 December 1808 Amaranthe joined Circe and Stork in destroying the French 16-gun schooner Cygne and two other schooners near Pearl Rock, Saint-Pierre, Martinique. The French vessels had already inflicted heavy casualties on the British vessels before Amaranthe arrived. Fire from Amaranthe compelled the crew of Cygne to abandon her, and Amaranthe's boats boarded and destroyed the French vessel. For her part Amaranthe lost one man killed and five wounded due to fire from batteries on the shore.

Brenton then volunteered to destroy the schooner grounded near Cygne. Men from Amaranthe and Express boarded the schooner and set fire to her too. This expedition cost Amaranthe her sailing master, Joshua Jones, who was severely wounded. The other British vessels that contributed boats also had casualties. Including the losses in the earlier fighting before Amaranthe arrived, the British had lost some 12 men killed, 31 wounded, and 26 missing (drowned or prisoners) for little gain. Cygne was armed with 18 guns and carried a crew of 140 men. She had been carrying flour, guns and cartridge paper for the relief of Martinique. The French schooners were armed and were carrying flour.

Brenton was promoted to post-captain soon after the battle, with the promotion being back dated to 13 December, the date of the battle. In 1847 the Admiralty authorized the NGSM with the clasp "Off the Pearl Rock 13 Decr. 1808".

Amaranthe shared with Captain, Pompee, and Morne Fortunee in the prize money pool of £772 3s 3d for the capture of Frederick on 30 December 1808. This money was paid in June 1829.

Command passed to Commander George Pringle in December 1808, but he was in command of Pultusk. As a result, he did not actually assume command until after January 1809.

Amaranthe took part in the successful invasion of Martinique in February 1809. During this campaign Pelham served on shore with a detachment of sailors and held the temporary Army rank of lieutenant colonel. In 1847 the Admiralty authorized the NGSM with clasp "Martinique" for the campaign.

In April 1809, a strong French squadron arrived at the Îles des Saintes, south of Guadeloupe. There they were blockaded until 14 April, when a British force under Major-General Frederick Maitland invaded and captured the islands. Amaranthe was among the naval vessels that shared in the proceeds of the capture of the islands. (Note: The prize agent for a number of the vessels involved, Henry Abbott, went bankrupt. In May 1835 there was a final payment of a dividend from his estate. A first-class share was worth 10s 2 3/4d; a sixth-class share, that of an ordinary seaman, was worth 1d. Seventh-class (landsmen) and eighth-class (boys) shares were fractions of a penny, too small to pay.)

On 18 June 1809 Amaranthe, under the command of Commander Pringle, was among the vessels in sight when Latona captured the French frigate Felicité, and so shared in the prize money.

Amaranthe also participated in the capture of Guadeloupe in January and February 1810. (Note: A first-class share of the prize money for Guadaloupe was worth £113 3s 1 1/4d; a sixth-class share, that of an ordinary seaman, was worth £1 9s 1 1/4d.) In 1847 the Admiralty awarded the Naval General Service Medal with clasp "Guadaloupe" to all surviving participants of the campaign.

Commander Richard Yates assumed command in July 1814.

== Fate ==
Amaranthe saw no further significant service. The Admiralty sold her at Woolwich on 12 October 1815 for £900.
