= French brig Palinure =

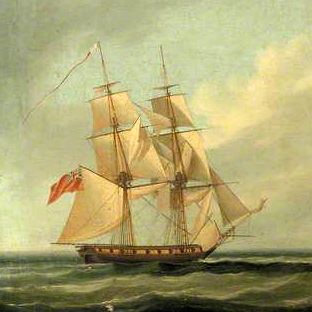
- Curieux (here in British service), sister-ship of Palinure

History

France
- Name: Palinure
- Namesake: Palinurus
- Ordered: 19 March 1803
- Builder: Louis, Antoine, and Maruthin Crucy, Lorient-Caudan
- Launched: 12 January 1804
- Commissioned: 20 May 1804
- Captured: 31 October 1808

United Kingdom
- Name: Snap
- Acquired: 31 October 1808
- Commissioned: 13 November 1808
- Out of service: 15 February 1811
- Honours and awards: Naval General Service Medal (NGSM) with clasps: "Martinique"; "Guadaloupe"
- Fate: Scrapped, June 1811

General characteristics
- Class & type: Palinure-class brig
- Displacement: 290 tons (French)
- Tons burthen: 31956/94 (bm)
- Length: 91 ft 1 in (27.8 m) (overall); 73 ft 1 1/2 in (22.3 m) (keel)
- Beam: 28 ft 1 1/2 in (8.573 m); 27 ft 7 1/2 in (8.4 m) mld
- Depth of hold: 12 ft 9 in (3.9 m)
- Sail plan: Brig
- Complement: French service=*94; British service: 100
- Armament: French service: 16 × 6-pounder guns; British service: 14 × 24-pounder carronades + 2 × 6-pounder guns

Palinure was the nameship for the Palinure-class of 16-gun brigs of the French Navy, and was launched in 1804. In French service she captured Carnation before Circe captured her in turn. After being taken into the Royal Navy as HMS Snap, she participated in two campaigns that qualified her crew for the Naval General Service Medal (NGSM). She was broken up in 1811.

== French service ==
Palinure was commissioned on 20 May 1804 under capitaine de frégate Jance. On 1 February 1805 she sailed with dispatches to Martinique.

She then took part in Allemand's expedition of 1805.

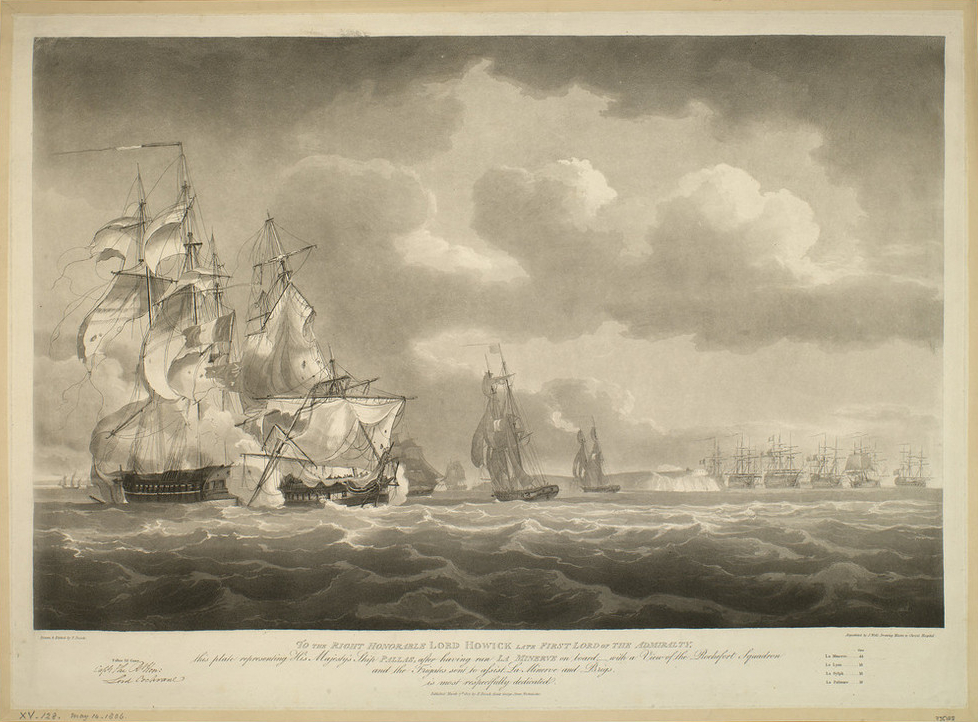
A view of HMS Pallas passing under the batteries of the Île-d'Aix on 14 May 1806. Pallas (second right), after having run La Minerve on board. Palinure, a part of the French Rochefort Squadron attends.

On the morning of 22 April 1808 in Grande Bourg Bay at Marie Galante, Palinure and Pilade encountered Goree, under Commander Joseph Spear. In the resulting engagement Goree lost one man killed and four wounded; the French lost eight killed and 21 wounded. After about an hour Palinure and Pilade made off when they saw the schooner HMS Superieure coming to Goree's assistance, followed a little while later by the frigate HMS Circe and the brig-sloop HMS Wolverine. Superieure exchanged some shots with the French brigs but the other two British vessels arrived too late actually to engage.

On 3 October 1808, Palinure captured the 18-gun Cruizer-class brig-sloop Carnation. Carnation's capture was due in part to the cowardice of a large part of her crew after the loss of her captain and heavy casualties. The British later recovered and burnt Carnation during their invasion of Martinique.

== Capture ==
On 31 October, Circe captured Palinure at Diamond Rock off Fort de France. Palinure, under the command of M. Fourniers, tried to take shelter under the guns of a battery on Pointe Solomon, but the battery was so high above the vessels that Circe did not fire at it as she came up. After a short engagement Palinure struck. She had lost seven men killed and eight wounded out of 79 men on board, most from the 83rd Regiment; Circe lost one man killed and one man wounded.

== British service ==
On 13 November Palinure was commissioned at Antigua as HMS Snap under Commander James Pattison Stewart, who transferred from Port d'Espagne. (Note: For more on Commander James Pattison Stewart see: O'Byrne, William R. (1849). "Stewart, James Pattison" . A Naval Biographical Dictionary. London: John Murray.)

Snap took part in the British capture of the French and Dutch West Indies, including the capture of Martinique in February 1809. In 1847 the Admiralty authorized the issue of the NGSM with the clasp "Martinique" to all remaining survivors of that campaign.

In August 1809, Commander Thomas Barclay took command of Snap, after having briefly commanded Epervier. In 1810 she was part of the force under Brigadier Harcourt that took the Dutch colony of Sint Maarten. There she provided cover for the troops landing at Little Cool Bay to encourage the Dutch governor to surrender his part of the island. Her participation in the campaigns would qualify her crew for the NGSM with the clasp "Guadaloupe". (Note: A first-class share of the prize money for Guadaloupe was worth £113 3s 1¼d; a sixth-class share, that of an ordinary seaman, was worth £1 9s 1¼d.)

Captain Frasier Douglas replaced Barclay, and was in turn replaced by Captain Robert Lisle Coulson.

== Fate ==
Snap arrived in Portsmouth on 20 January 1811 and was paid off on 15 February. She was broken up in June at Sheerness.
