= Bonetta (1809 ship) =

American (1800–1808) and UK (1809–1810) vessel

History

U.S.
- Name: Bonetta
- Launched: 1800, Duxbury, Massachusetts
- Captured: 20 November 1808

United Kingdom
- Name: Bonetta
- Acquired: 1809 by purchase of a prize
- Captured: 4 December 1810

General characteristics
- Tons burthen: 173, or 227, or 22774/95 (bm)
- Length: 83 ft 0 in (25.3 m)
- Beam: 25 ft 3 in (7.7 m)
- Depth of hold: 12 ft 7 1/2 in (3.8 m)
- Complement: 11 (at capture)
- Armament: At capture: no guns; British service: 4 × 4-pounder guns + 8 × 6-pounder carronades

Bonetta was an American vessel that was launched in 1800, at Duxbury, Massachusetts. The British Royal Navy captured her in 1808. She then became a West Indiaman. Her owners appealed her capture to the Vice admiralty court at Antigua, but without success. A French privateer captured her in 1810.

== Origins and capture ==
Bonetta was launched at Duxbury, Massachusetts in 1800. In 1803, her master was Benjamin Russell. In February 1804, she returned to Salem from Mocha with 268,851 pounds of coffee, consigned to Benjamin Pickman, Jr. In 1804, Thomas B. Osgood replaced Russel, only to be replaced by Archelaus Rea.

On 20 November 1808, HMS Amaranthe, Circe, Cherub, Epervier, and Unique participated in the capture of the American vessel Bonetta. Prize money was paid in 1814, and 1839. (Note: A first–class share for the capture of Intrepid and Bonetta was worth £8 7s 8d; a sixth-class share, that of an ordinary seaman, was worth 3s 2d.)

== British merchantman ==
Bonetta first appeared in Lloyd's Register (LR) in 1809, with J.Cock, master, Hay & Co., owners, and trade London–Antigua. She was described as an American prize.

Capture: On 4 December 1810, the French privateer Duc de Dantzig captured Bonetta. Lloyd's List reported that the capture of Bonetta, Cock, master, took place off Sombrero, Anguilla as Bonetta was sailing from Guadeloupe to Charleston. It further reported that Duke of Dantzick was armed with fourteen 18-pounder carronades and had a crew of 100 men. Duke had recently captured Industry, Moore, master, which was sailing from St Kitts to Wilmington, and a Spanish three-masted schooner carrying dry goods from Cadiz to Vera Cruz. Duke of Dantzick destroyed both. However, Bonetta arrived at Cadiz on 30 January 1811, and not in French possession. Aregnaudeau had put a prize crew of ten of his men, plus two Spaniards and two Portuguese on Bonetta. On 22 December, the Spaniards and Portuguese attacked the Frenchmen, killed three, and took possession of the ship. While Bonetta was at Cadiz, a gale from 27 to 29 March, cost her her foremast, bowsprit, etc. The entry for Bonetta in the Register of Shipping (RS) for 1811, carried the annotation "Captured".

Lloyd's Register continued to carry Bonetta, and conflated her with a later Bonetta that was an American prize that appeared shortly after the Bonetta of this article was lost.

Year	Master	Owner	Trade	Source
1812	J.Cock; T.Nevins	Hay & Co.	London–Guadeloupe	LR; burthen 173 tons
1813	T.Nevan	M'Intosh	London–CGH	LR; burthen 212 tons
