= Duc de Dantzig (1808 ship) =

French merchant and privateer ship 1808–1812

History

France
- Name: Duc de Dantzig
- Namesake: François Joseph Lefebvre
- Builder: Nantes
- Launched: 1808 (Note: Alain Demerliac and Stéphane de La Nicollière-Teijeiro give the year of building for Duc de Dantzig as 1803. However Lefebvre was not appointed to the newly-created position until his success at the siege of Danzig (1807). Furthermore, Demerliac does not report that Duc de Danzig had any other, earlier name.)
- Commissioned: October 1810 (as privateer)
- Fate: Disappeared in June 1812, or later

General characteristics
- Type: Brig
- Displacement: 291 tons (French)
- Crew: 103
- Armament: 14 × 18-pounder carronades

Duc de Dantzig (or Duc-de-Dantzick) was a brig launched in 1808 at Nantes that became a privateer. She captured a number of vessels, generally plundering them and then letting them go, or burning them. She disappeared mysteriously in the Caribbean in early 1812, and became the subject of a ghost ship legend.

== Privateer ==
In 1807, shipowner Tiesset commissioned Duc de Dantzig under Captain Jean-Pierre Antoine Duchenne, with 14 guns and 50 men. On 26 November 1807, she forced Amante (?) to beach near Dannes. Duchenne being incapacited by illness, Pierre-François Baclin took command on 12 February 1808. Duc de Dantzig took part in the capture of William & Henry, along with the naval ships Estelle, Mars, and Chasseur. Lloyd's List (LL) reported that William & Henry was sailing from London to the Cape of Good Hope with a cargo worth 700,000 francs when bad weather drove her into Le Havre with the loss of her mizzen mast and bowsprit. Duc de Dantzig took possession of William & Henry the next day. Duchenne had to sue, successfully, for his share in the capture of William & Henry. Baclin eventually received a share of 220,250.21 francs.

That there seem to be no reports of captures after the first until 1811 suggests that prior to October 1810 she may have simply sailed as a letter of marque rather than as a private man-of-war.

In October 1810, François Aregnaudeau assumed command of Duc de Dantzig. On 20 November he captured Ceres, on 4 December the British Bonetta, and a few days later the American Cantone and the British Jane in the Gulf of Mexico.

Lloyd's List reported that the capture of Bonetta, Cock, master, took place off Sombrero, Anguilla as Bonetta was sailing from Guadeloupe to Charleston. It further reported that Duke of Dantzick was armed with fourteen 18-pounder carronades and had a crew of 100 men. Duke had recently captured Industry, Moore, master, which was sailing from St Kitts to Wilmington, and the Spanish three-masted schooner General Romana carrying dry goods from Cadiz to Vera Cruz. Duke of Dantzick destroyed both. However, Bonetta arrived at Cadiz on 30 January 1811, and not in French possession. Aregnaudeau had put a prize crew of ten of his men, plus two Spaniards and two Portuguese on Bonetta. On 22 December the Spaniards and Portuguese attacked the Frenchmen, killed three, and took possession of the ship. While Bonetta was at Cadiz, a gale from 27 to 29 March cost her her foremast, bowsprit, etc.

Duc de Dantzig captured Jane on 18 November 1810 off Anegada as Jane was sailing from St Kitts to Newburn. Duc de Dantzig plundered her and then let her proceed. Jane, Cochrane, master, returned to Saint Kitts on 6 February 1811.

Duc de Dantzig brought Jane, Hutchinson, master, into Charleston on 6 February 1811. Jane had been sailing from Savannah to Liverpool when she was captured.

Damaged by a heavy sea, Duc de Dantzig had to throw her guns overboard to remain afloat and returned to harbour. She set sail again on 18 June 1811.

On 22 July 1811 Duc de Dantzig captured the merchantman Lady Penrhyn while Lady Penrhyn was sailing from London to Grenada. Duc de Dantzig set Lady Penrhyn on fire, scuttling her. LL reported that the privateer Duc de Dantzig, of 14 guns (18-pounder carronades) and 128 men, of Nantes, had captured Thames, J. Clark, master, on 17 July, and Lady Penrhyn, Burgess, master on 22 July. Thames had been sailing from London to St Vincent's, and Lady Penrhyn from London to Grenada. Both vessels were in ballast, and Duc de Danzig burnt them after taking off the people on board them. She then captured the schooner Ann, which had set out from Barbados to Demerara. Duc de Dantzig put her prisoners aboard Ann and let her proceed; Ann arrived at Barbados on 26 July. (Note: Lloyd's Register (1811), shows Thames, of 221 tons (bm), as having been launched in 1790 at Southampton. She was apparently armed with sixteen 6-pounder guns.)

Barrosa, Barry, master, arrived at Jamaica on 23 July. On 29 June, as she was sailing from Cork she had encountered the privateer Duc de Danzig off Ushant. Duc de Dantzig, of 10 guns and 176 men, had plundered Barrosa (1811 Nantes ship) and thrown her guns overboard, and had then let her proceed.Duc de Dantzig had captured a Spanish ship and an English packet three days earlier. On 28 August, Duc de Dantzig arrived in New York with a British prize that the US government seized. By October 1811, Aregnaudeau had captured Planter, from London, Tottenham, and a Spanish schooner.

On 1 September Duc de Dantzig captured Tobago, Paterson, master, off St Bartholomew's. Tobago was sailing from Guadeloupe and St Bartholemew's to New Brunswick when Duc de Dantzig captured and burnt her. (Note: Tobago, M'Lauren, master, of 375 tons (bm), was two years old and built at Shields. She was armed with ten 9-pounder guns and four 6-pounder carronades.)

Rover, Everett, master, arrived at St John, New Brunswick, on 23 June 1812. On 2 June Duc de Dantzig had captured Rover, plundered her, and then let her proceed.

Aregnaudeau and Duc de Dantzig were last heard of on 13 December 1811, when the privateer Gazelle reached Morlaix and reported on her activities.

== Fate ==
After the last mention of her, Duc de Dantzig disappeared without a trace. She might have been cruising in the Atlantic or in the Caribbean at the time, and either been sunk in a night encounter against a British frigate, or in a tropical cyclone.

Napoléon Gallois later relayed the legend that an unspecified French frigate had encountered the wreck of Duc de Dantzig drifting at sea, covered with dried blood and the putrefying corpses of her crew, many crucified to the masts or the deck. There were no signs that she had been in a recent battle: no new shot holes, and her sails and rigging were intact. Some blood-stained papers found in the captain's cabin identified her captain as François Aregnaudeau. The crew of the frigate set the brig ablaze.
