= Thomas Tudor Tucker (Royal Navy officer) =

Rear-Admiral Thomas Tudor Tucker CB
- Born: 29 June 1775
- Died: 20 July 1852 (aged 77)
- Military career
- Allegiance: United Kingdom
- Branch: Royal Navy
- Service years: 1793–1846
- Rank: Rear-Admiral
- Commands: HMS Dolphin; HMS Cherub; HMS Andromeda; HMS Comus
- Conflicts: Napoleonic Wars
- Awards: Companion of the Order of the Bath

Thomas Tudor Tucker, CB (1775–1852) was a British sailor from Bermuda. He was a Rear Admiral in the British Navy.

== Life ==
He was the namesake of his bachelor uncle, Thomas Tudor Tucker, who served as the third Treasurer of the United States. The third of the eight sons (all in the public service) of Henry Tucker, secretary of the council of the Bermudas, he was born on 29 June 1775; Henry St George Tucker was his eldest brother.

After two voyages in the service of the East India Company, Tucker entered the Royal Navy in 1793 as master's mate of HMS Argo, with Captain William Clark, whom he followed to HMS Sampson, and HMS Victorious, in which he was present at the reduction of the Cape of Good Hope. On 21 March 1796 he was appointed acting lieutenant of HMS Suffolk on the East India station, in which and afterwards in the sloop HMS Swift, again in Victorious and in HMS Sceptre, he served as acting lieutenant for nearly four years. On her way homewards Sceptre was lost in Table Bay, on 5 November 1799. Many of her crew perished, and Tucker was left to find his own passage to England.

On arriving in London Tucker learned that the Admiralty refused to confirm his irregular promotion, and, after passing a second examination, he was made a lieutenant on 20 May 1800, into HMS Prince George, in which, and then in HMS Prince, he served in the Channel fleet till the Peace of Amiens. In June 1803 he was appointed to HMS Northumberland, carrying the flag of Rear-admiral Alexander Cochrane, at first off Ferrol, and later on in the West Indies, where, on 6 February 1806, he was present in the Battle of St. Domingo. He was then appointed by the admiral acting commander of HMS Dolphin, and, in succession, of several other ships; but his rank was not confirmed till 15 February 1808. In April he was moved into HMS Epervier. In it, and then in HMS Cherub, he captured enemy vessels protected by shore batteries.

In February 1810 Tucker assisted in the reduction of Guadeloupe. On the special recommendation of the commander-in-chief, Sir Francis Laforey promoted him to post rank on 1 August 1811. Remaining in Cherub, he sailed to England in September 1812, in charge of a large convoy.

Tucker was ordered to refit Cherub for foreign service, and early in December sailed for South America, and on to the Pacific, where, at the Juan Fernández Islands, he joined Captain James Hillyar of HMS Phoebe. He assisted in the capture of USS Essex, near Valparaíso, on 28 March 1814, a fight in which Tucker was severely wounded. In August 1815 Cherub returned to England, and was paid off.

Tucker then commanded HMS Andromeda and HMS Comus for a few months, but after May 1816 had no employment. On 4 July 1840 he was nominated a Companion of the Order of the Bath; and on 1 October 1846 was put on the retired list, with the rank of rear-admiral. He died in London on 20 July 1852.

== Family ==
Tucker married, in 1811, Anne Byam Wyke, eldest daughter of Daniel Hill of Antigua, and left a son and three daughters.

== See also ==
- O'Byrne, William Richard (1849). "Tucker, Thomas Tudor" . A Naval Biographical Dictionary . John Murray – via Wikisource.

== Notes ==
Attribution

This article incorporates text from a publication now in the public domain: Lee, Sidney, ed. (1899). "Tucker, Thomas Tudor". Dictionary of National Biography. Vol. 57. London: Smith, Elder & Co.
