= HMS Morne Fortunee (1808) =

Brig of the Royal Navy

History

United Kingdom
- Name: HMS Morne Fortunee
- Acquired: 1808 by capture
- Honours and awards: Naval General Service Medal (NGSM), with clasp "Guadaloupe"
- Fate: Broken up 1813

General characteristics
- Tons burthen: 184, or 210 (bm)
- Propulsion: Sails
- Sail plan: Brig
- Complement: Privateer:60; RN:55
- Armament: Privateer:5 guns (pierced for 14); RN:8 × 12-pounder carronades + 2 × 6-pounder chase guns
- Notes: Built of Bermuda cedar

HMS Morne Fortunee was a French privateer captured in 1808 and taken into Royal Navy service. She participated in the capture of Guadeloupe in 1810 before she was broken up at Antigua in October 1813.

== Capture ==
In August 1808 HMS Belette captured the French privateer Joséphine, which the Royal Navy took into service as Morne Fortunee.

== Royal Navy ==
By one report Lieutenant John James Rorie commissioned her in 1808. However, that may simply reflect confusion with his being in command of her predecessor, HMS Morne Fortunee for a period during the year; that Morne Fortunee was not lost until January 1809.

In 1809 Morne Fortunee was under the command of Lieutenant Willis (or Wills). He commanded her when she participated in the capture of Guadeloupe in January–February 1810. She was among the vessels for which in 1847 the Admiralty awarded the NGSM with clasp "Guadaloupe".

In 1810 Lieutenant Wells replaced Willis. Lieutenant Joseph Steele replaced Wells in 1811.
