= HMS Forester (1806) =

Brig-sloop of the Royal Navy

- Forester

History

United Kingdom
- Name: HMS Forester
- Namesake: Forester
- Builder: John King, Dover
- Launched: 1806
- Commissioned: 1806
- Decommissioned: 1817
- Honors and awards: Naval General Service Medal (NGSM) with clasps: "Martinique"; "Guadaloupe"
- Fate: Sold 1819

General characteristics
- Class & type: Cruizer-class brig-sloop
- Tons burthen: 38426/94 (bm)
- Length: 100 ft 0 in (30.5 m) (gundeck); 77 ft 2 7/8 in (23.5 m) (keel)
- Beam: 30 ft 7 in (9.3 m)
- Draught: 6 ft 0 in (1.8 m) (unladen); 10 ft 00 in (3.0 m) (laden)
- Depth of hold: 12 ft 9 in (3.89 m)
- Sail plan: Brig
- Complement: 121
- Armament: 16 × 32-pounder carronades + 2 × 6-pounder bow guns

HMS Forester was a Royal Navy 18-gun Cruizer-class brig-sloop built by John King and launched in 1806 at Dover. She had a relatively uneventful career before the Navy sold her in 1819.

== Service ==
Forester entered service in 1806 under Captain John Richards and was sent to act as a convoy escort for ships sailing to the Baltic. During this service Forester also recaptured a British merchant vessel. Off the Netherlands she captured the smuggler Hiram. In 1808, Forester was caught in a gale, and several vessels were wrecked; Forester was also tasked with burning the frigate Flora, one of the vessels that had been wrecked. Soon afterward Forester escorted a convoy to Gorée and was then refitted at Spithead, subsequently sailing to Corunna.

Forester sailed for the West Indies on 29 August 1808. Operating off Barbados, Forester participated in the invasion of Martinique in January 1809. In 1847 the Admiralty awarded all surviving claimants from the campaign the NGSM with clasp "Martinique".

On 31 May 1809 Richards sent boats from his small squadron under the command of Lieutenant Robert Carr of the gun-brig Attentive to capture a French letter of marque and a schooner from under the protection of four long-guns and 300 soldiers at the Port du Molas. Carr captured the vessels and then landed, spiked the guns, and blew up the French magazine.

Command passed to John E. Watt later in 1809, and under his command Forester also participated in the capture of Guadeloupe in January and February 1810. (Note: A first-class share of the prize money for Guadaloupe was worth £113 3s 1 1/4d; a sixth-class share, that of an ordinary seaman, was worth £1 9s 1 1/4d.) In 1847, the Admiralty awarded the Naval General Service Medal with a clasp of "Guadaloupe" to all surviving participants of the campaign. (Note: The notice in the London Gazette incorrectly lists his name as "Wall".)

In 1812 Commander Alexander Kennedy replaced Watt. On 23 March 1813, Forester sailed to Jamaica to replace Brazen, who had recently returned to Spithead. Forester's orders were to accompany Sceptre as escort to a convoy and there to place herself under the orders of Admiral Charles Stirling.

On 5 May Sapphire and Forester captured the American privateer Mary Ann off San Domingo. She was armed with a long 9-pounder gun and a 4-pounder. Mary Ann was under the command of Peter Charriol and had a crew of 30, one of whom was found dead. She was 20 days out of Charleston and had made no captures. From the number of small arms on board, Kennedy suspected that Charriol had planned to gather more men.

On 15 May Circe and Forrester captured the 5-gun Lovely Lass off Jamaica. The capture followed a chase of 19 hours, during which the Lovely Lass threw four of her guns overboard. Her commander was Mr. John Smith of the American Navy, and she had a crew of 60 men. Smith reported that he had been out 44 days and had made no captures. A later report gave her tonnage as 80 tons and her crew as 73 men. She was from Wilmington and Circe sent her to Kingston. On 5 July, Forrester captured the ship Granger.

On 27 November 1813 Forester captured an American schooner by an unknown name. (Note: A first-class share of the head money was worth £32 15s 7 3/4d; a sixth-class share was worth 9s 3d.)

In April 1814, the Navy dismissed Kennedy from Forester and suspended him from his rank for two years for disobeying orders from Rear-Admiral William Brown. Command then passed to William Hendry. Later that year Commander Alexander Karley replaced Hendry, and then Commander J.M'Dougall replaced Karley.

== Fate ==
In 1817, following the end of the wars, Forester was paid off at Portsmouth. She was sold there on 8 March 1819 to G. Young for £1,130.
