= HMS Carnation (1807) =

Brig-sloop of the Royal Navy

- Carnation

History

United Kingdom
- Name: HMS Carnation
- Builder: Taylor, Bideford
- Launched: 3 October 1807
- Captured: 3 October 1808 by the French

France
- Name: Carnation
- Acquired: 3 October 1808
- Fate: Burned 31 January 1809

General characteristics
- Class & type: 18-gun Cruizer-class brig-sloop
- Tons burthen: 383 27/94 (bm)
- Length: 100 ft 1 in (30.51 m) (overall); 77 ft 3 in (23.55 m) (keel)
- Beam: 30 ft 6 1/2 in (9.309 m)
- Depth of hold: 12 ft 9 1/4 in (3.893 m)
- Propulsion: Sails
- Sail plan: Brig-sloop
- Complement: 121
- Armament: 16 × 32-pounder carronades + 2 × 6-pounder guns

HMS Carnation was a Royal Navy 18-gun Cruizer-class brig-sloop built by Taylor at Bideford and launched in 1807. After the French brig Palinure captured her, she was burned by the French to prevent her recapture.

== Career ==
Carnation entered service at Plymouth in 1807 under Commander Charles Mars Gregory, who sailed her to the West Indies in 1808. On 3 October, the French brig Palinure engaged Carnation 180 nautical miles (330 km; 210 mi) northeast of Martinique. Gregory and all his officers were killed or wounded in the opening exchanges and Palinure′s crew attempted to board. Carnation′s crew were mustered to resist, but a Royal Marine sergeant named John Chapman refused the order and led over 30 men below decks to await capture. The remaining crewmen were outnumbered and had to surrender.

Carnation had lost 10 killed and 30 wounded, perhaps half mortally; the French lost about 15 men killed and wounded. The French then took Carnation to Marin Bay, Martinique.

The French commissioned Carnation on 31 January 1809 under the command of Ensign de vaisseau Simon-Auguste Huguet. Huguet had distinguished himself in the engagement as Palinure's Capitaine de frègate Pierre-François Jance had been debilitated by yellow fever and reportedly died within an hour of the victory after transferring to Carnation, which was the better vessel.

== Fate ==
During the invasion of Martinique in January 1809, British troops landed close to where she was berthed. On 31 January 1809 her crew set Carnation on fire, destroying her.

== Postscript ==
The British arrested Chapman and 31 of the crew who had deserted the deck during the battle. A court martial convicted them of cowardice; Chapman was hanged from the yardarm of Ulysses the day after his sentence was passed. The others were sentenced to floggings and transportation as convicts to Botany Bay for 14 years, though it is not clear this part of their sentence was ever carried out. One man was acquitted.

On 31 October 1808, the frigate Circe encountered Palinure near Diamond Rock. A short engagement followed in which Circe captured Palinure. She had lost seven killed and eight wounded; Circe had lost one man killed and one wounded. The British took Palinure into service as HMS Snap.
