= HMS Julia =

Brig-sloop of the Royal Navy

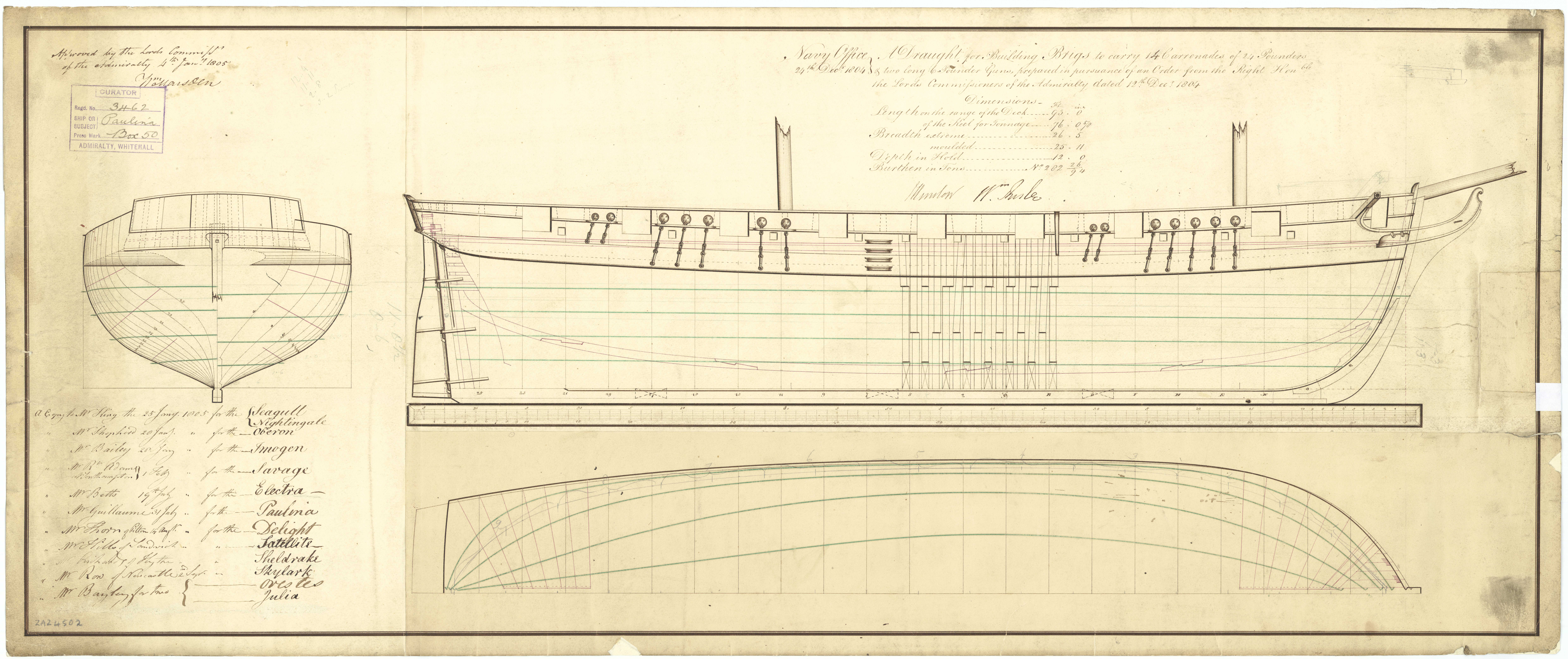
- Julia

History

United Kingdom
- Name: HMS Julia
- Ordered: 30 July 1805
- Builder: Jabez Bayley, Ipswich
- Laid down: October 1806
- Launched: 4 February 1806
- Fate: Wrecked 1817

General characteristics
- Type: 16-gun brig-sloop
- Tons burthen: 284 26/94 (bm)
- Length: 93 ft 1 in (28.4 m) (overall); 76 ft 1 1/4 in (23.2 m) (keel)
- Beam: 26 ft 6 in (8.1 m)
- Depth of hold: 12 ft 0 1/2 in (3.7 m)
- Sail plan: Sloop
- Complement: 95
- Armament: 14 × 24-pounder carronades; 2 × 6-pounder bow guns

HMS Julia was a British Royal Navy 16-gun brig-sloop of the Seagull class launched in February 1806. After a fairly uneventful decade-long career she was wrecked at Tristan da Cunha in 1817 with heavy loss of life.

== Napoleonic Wars ==
Commander Robert Yarker (occasionally mis-written as Tarker) commissioned Julia in February 1806 for the North Sea. He sailed her for the West Indies on 28 June 1807.

In March 1808 she was under the command of Commander John Ellis Watt, but one month later Commander Charles Warde was appointed to replace Watt. (Note: For more on Charles Warde see: O'Byrne, William R. (1849). "Warde, Charles" . A Naval Biographical Dictionary. London: John Murray.) At the time Julia was in the Leeward Islands. After Netley capsized on 10 July, Julia rescued the nine survivors.

Watt still commanded Julia on 30 August when he captured a French lugger boat privateer, the Petit Decide, of Martinique. She had a crew of 22 men, armed with small arms, and was sailing from Guadeloupe to Marie-Galante with a howitzer, ammunition, and other stores for the troops there.

In November Commander Charles Kerr took command. Commander William Dowers replaced Kerr in 1809, who later was appointed to Wolverine on 11 December 1809.

On 21 May 1809, Julia and Unique were at Basse Terre as part of a squadron under Captain Philip Beaver of Acasta. They sighted a French schooner sheltering under the protection of some guns, and recognized the vessel as one that had sailed under their protection for several days while flying the Swedish flag. Beaver sent in Julia and Unique to try and cut her out, but she was stuck fast on shore. Lieutenant Thomas Fellowes, captain of Unique, then led a party of 24 men ashore to spike an enemy battery's guns despite being opposed by a large French regular force; in the attack one man was killed, a midshipman from Julia, and seven men were seriously wounded. Of the remaining men, all but Fellowes were at least lightly wounded; he was the only unwounded man to return from the raid.

In early June 1809 Cherub and Julia, under Dowers' command, sailed into the anchorage at Basse-Terre to cut out two French frigates lying there under the protection of a fort and some batteries. As they sailed in they were subject to fire from shore batteries, which fortunately had no effect. The wind suddenly failed the British vessels, which were nevertheless able to extricate themselves from the situation with no losses or damage, but no success either.

On 18 June 1809 Latona and Cherub captured one of the French frigates, the Félicité. At the time of her capture, Félicité was armed with only 14 guns, but had 174 men on board. She had left Guadeloupe in company with another frigate and was sailing to France with colonial produce. The second frigate escaped through superior sailing despite Cherub having conducted a long chase. Julia was among the vessels in sight or on the blockade of the Saints and so shared in the proceeds of the capture. HMS Bonne Citoyenne captured the second frigate, the Furieuse, on 5 July 1809.

In October 1810 Commander Henry Coxen replaced Dowers. (Note: Dowers received promotion to Post captain on 24 September 1814, but died at Antigua on 26 December 1816.) The next year Commander Valentine Gardner replaced Coxen.

Julia was at Portsmouth on 31 July 1812 when the British authorities seized the American ships there and at Spithead on the outbreak of the War of 1812. She therefore shared, with numerous other vessels, in the subsequent prize money for these vessels: Belleville, Aeos, Janus, Ganges, and Leonidas.

Between September 1813 and March 1814 Julia underwent repairs and fitting for ordinary. She then remained in ordinary until 1815.

== Post war and fate ==
Between August and November 1815, Julia underwent fitting for sea at Chatham. Commander John Watling commissioned her in September for Saint Helena, but soon had to return to Britain for his health. In May 1816 Commander Jenkin Jones was appointed to replace Watling at St Helena, but from May to August Julia was under the command of Lieutenant Francis James Lewis (acting).

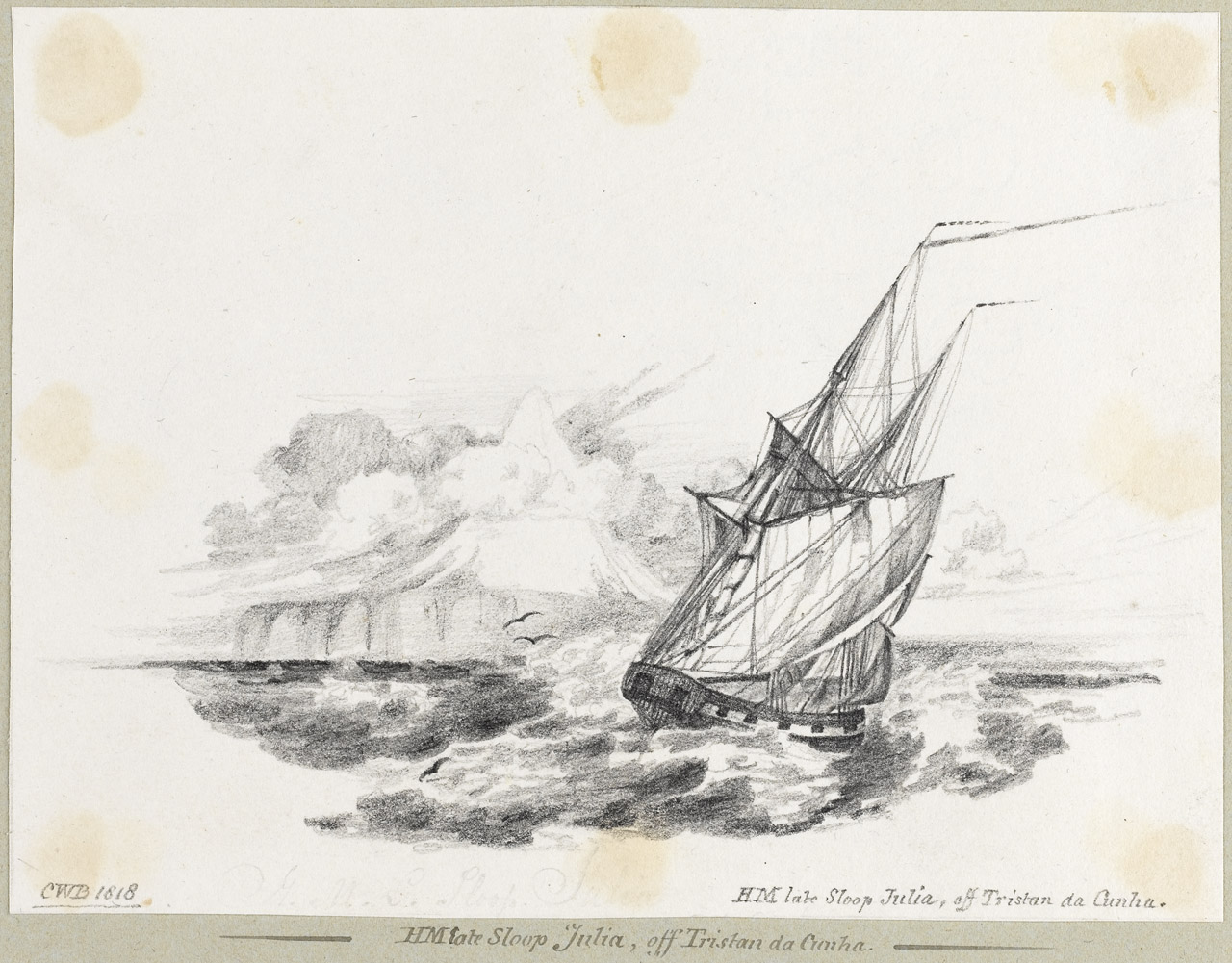
H.M. sloop Julia off Tristan da Cunha, a sketch by midshipman C. W. Browne

Julia was stationed at Ascension Island when Jones in 1817 received orders to sail her to Tristan da Cunha. She arrived on 28 September, but the weather was bad and she spent two days cruising off Falmouth Bay.

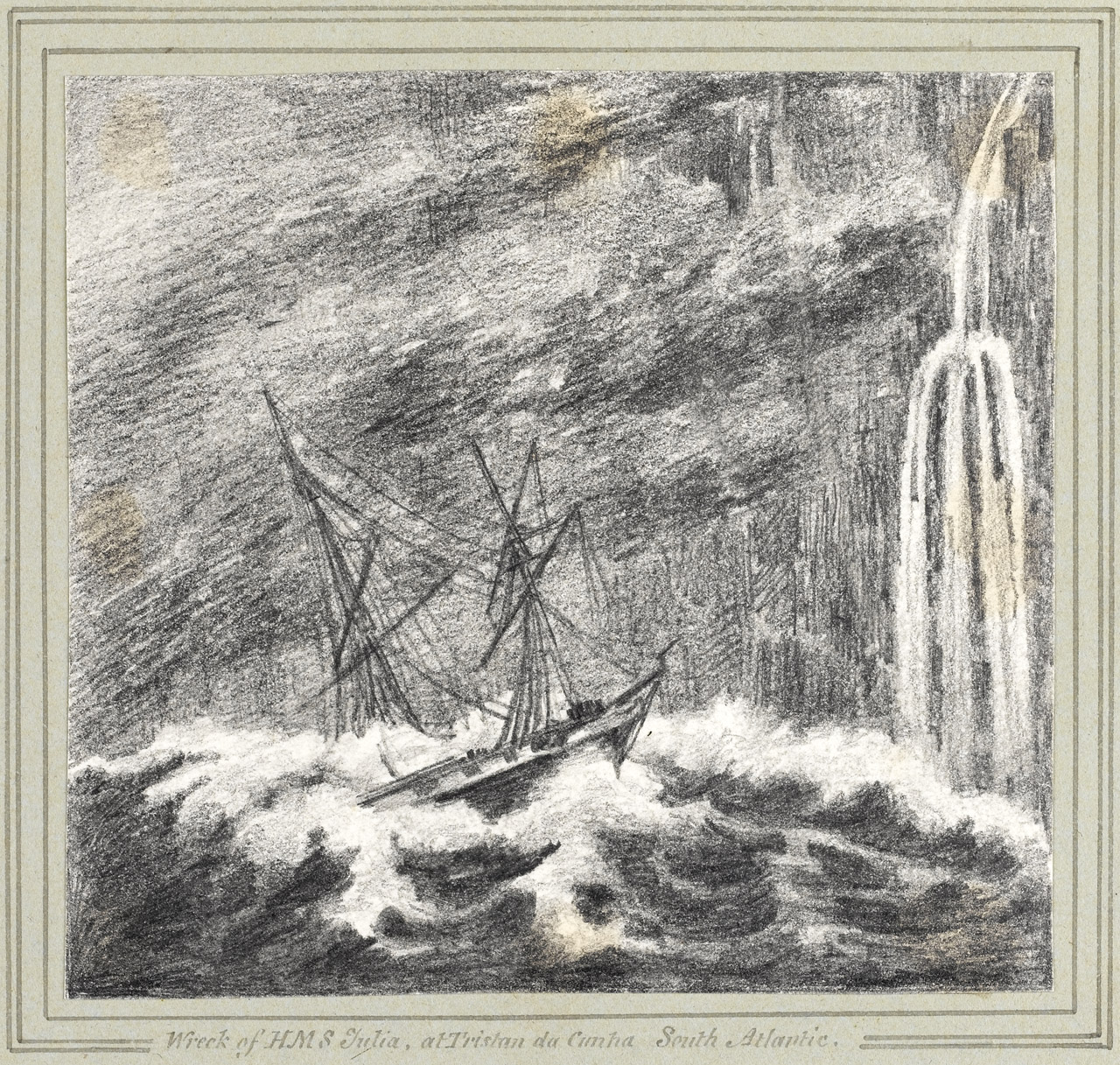
The wrecking

On 1 October Jones was able to anchor two miles off shore and he and a boat crew came on shore. During the night a sudden gale came up. Julia lost her anchor and cables and the gale drove her onshore, battering her to pieces. Some men were able to get ashore via a fallen mast. Still, 55 men drowned, as did one woman, the wife of a marine. Forty-two bodies were buried on shore; later a memorial was erected on the spot.

Griffon arrived at Tristan da Cunha two days after the wreck. Jones prevailed upon Captain Wright of Griffon to return the survivors to the Cape. The subsequent court-martial at Portsmouth exonerated Jones for the loss of Julia.

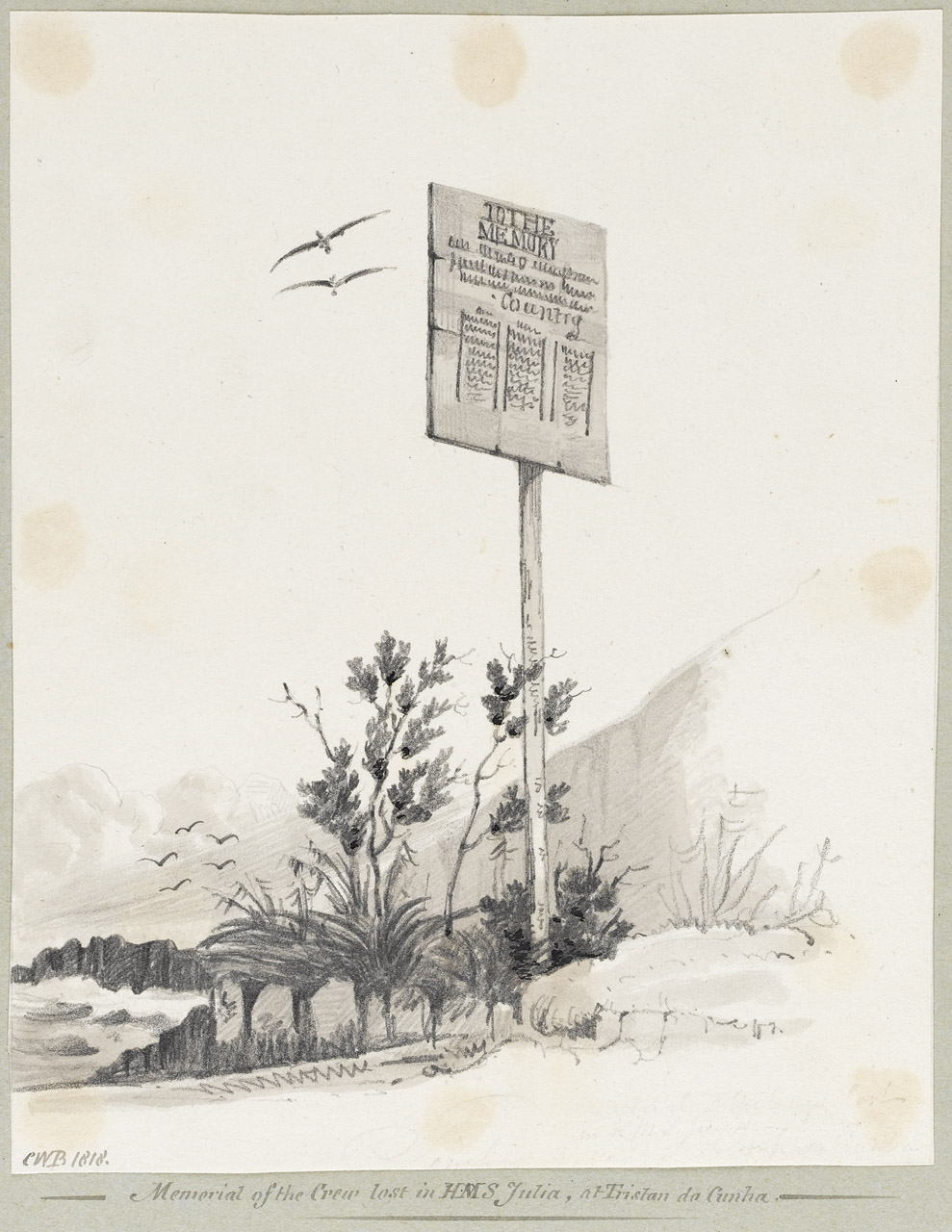
1817 memorial of the crew lost in HMS Julia at Tristan da Cunha
