= HMS Epervier (1803) =

Brig-sloop of the Royal Navy

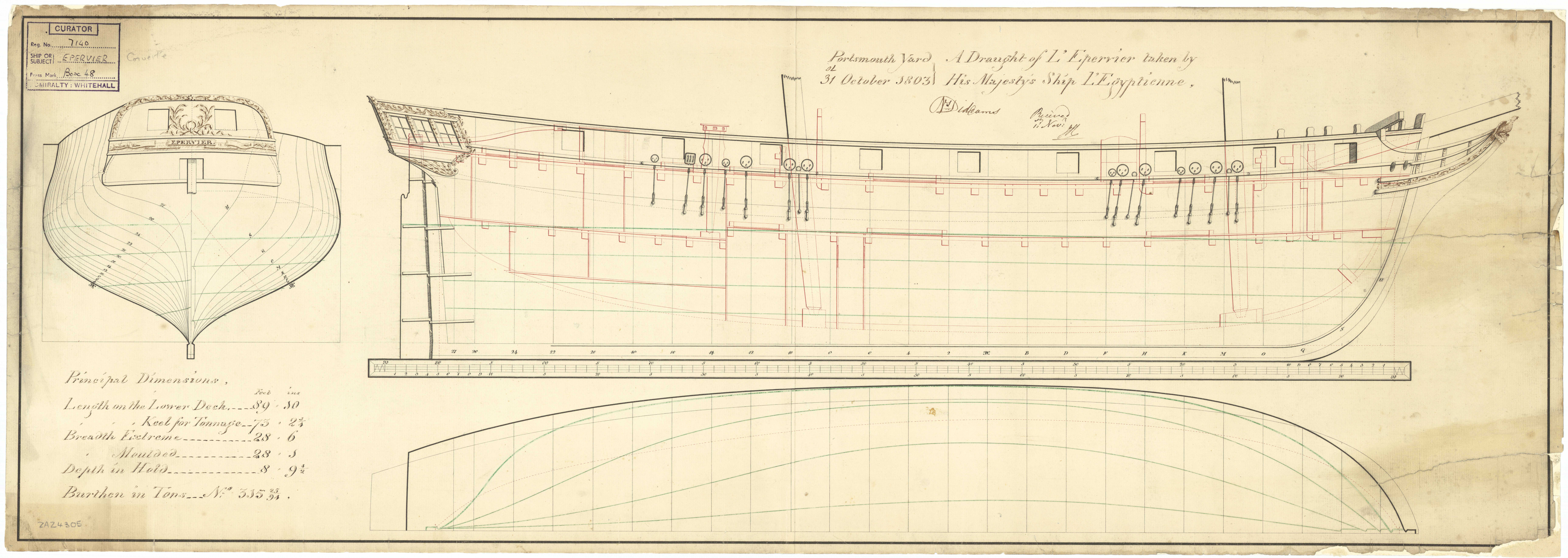
- Epervier

History

France
- Name: Epervier
- Builder: Louis, Antoine, and Mathurin Crucy, Basse-Indre
- Laid down: October 1801
- Launched: 30 June 1802
- Completed: 1802
- Commissioned: 20 July 1802
- Captured: 27 July 1803, by the Royal Navy

United Kingdom
- Name: HMS Epervier
- Commissioned: May 1804
- Honours and awards: Naval General Service Medal with clasps; "St. Domingo"; "Off the Pearl Rock 13 Decr. 1808"
- Fate: Scrapped June 1811

General characteristics
- Class & type: Alcyon class
- Type: Brig-sloop
- Displacement: 320 tons (French)
- Tons burthen: 31515/94 (bm)
- Length: Overall:89 ft 10 in (27.4 m); Keel:73 ft 2 1/4 in (22.3 m)
- Beam: 28 ft 6 in (8.7 m)
- Depth of hold: 8 ft 9 1/2 in (2.7 m)
- Sail plan: Brig
- Complement: 121 men (British service)
- Armament: French service: 16 × 4-pounder guns; British service: 16 × 32-pounder carronades + 2 × 6-pounder guns

HMS Epervier was a French 16-gun Alcyon-class brig. HMS Egyptienne captured her in the Atlantic Ocean on 27 July 1803; she was taken into Royal Navy service under her existing name. Before being broken up in 1811 she captured several prizes and was present at the Battle of San Domingo. Her crew received a clasp to the Naval General Service Medal for their participation in that battle and another for an action in December 1808. She was laid up in late 1810 and was sold in 1811.

== French origins and capture ==
Epervier was built between 1801 and 1802 by Enterprise Crucy Basse-Indre (near Nantes) to a design by François Gréhan. She was launched on 30 June 1802.

She was commissioned under Lieutenant de vaisseau Emmanuel Halgan. At some point Jérôme Bonaparte boarded her. On 31 August 1802 she sailed from Nantes for Martinique and Guadeloupe.

Captain Charles Fleeming (Fleming) and Egyptienne captured Epervier off the coast of France on 27 July 1803 as she was returning to Lorient from Guadeloupe. At the time she was armed with 16 guns and had a crew of 90 men.

== British service ==
The British rearmed her, upgrading her battery substantially. Commander James Watson commissioned her in May 1804 and then in August Commander John Impey assumed command and sailed for Jamaica the next month.

On 15 January 1805, Epervier captured Sally. (Note: A seaman's share of the prize money amounted to 13s 4 3/4d.)

Then eleven days later, Epervier was in the Leeward Islands, six miles from Crab Island. For five hours she chased a strange sail before she succeeded in capturing the French privateer schooner Elizabeth from Marie Galante. Elizabeth was armed with four carriage guns and small arms. One of her crew of 34 was killed during her "obstinate Attempt to escape." She had already taken a sloop from Tortola that she had sent into St. Thomas.

On 9 May Epervier and Circe captured Charles. Later that month, on 25 May Epervier captured the Spanish schooner Casualidad. She was taking a cargo of cocoa from Puerto Cabello to Old Spain.

Lieutenant James Higginson (acting) assumed command in January 1806. On 6 February Epervier was with the squadron under Vice Admiral Sir John Duckworth in Superb, which took or destroyed five sail of the line in the Battle of San Domingo. Epervier was too small to take part in the battle but she did share in the prize money. In 1847 Her crew also qualified for the Naval General Service Medal with clasp "St. Domingo".

Commander Samuel J. Pechell assumed command of Epervier in March 1807 until April when John Bowker of San Josef was promoted from lieutenant to the command. Ill health forced Bowker to give up his command to Thomas Tudor Tucker from Curieux. On 11 May, while under Tucker's command, Epervier captured the brig Mildred.

Bowker re-assumed command and on 27 October was in command of Epevier when she captured the Danish galliot Active. However, Bowken then had to return home in February 1808. His successor was again Tucker.

On 11 November, Circe, Epervier, and Amaranthe captured Intrepid. Nine days later, Amaranthe, Circe, Cherub, Epervier and Unique captured the American ships Bonetta and Mary and Allen. Prize money for Intrepid and Bonetta was paid in 1814, and 1839. (Note: A first–class share for the capture of Intrepid and Bonetta was worth £8 7s 8d; a sixth-class share, that of an ordinary seaman, was worth 3s 2d.)

On 12 December Epervier joined the frigate Circe, the ship-sloop Stork, the schooner Morne Fortunee, and the advice boat Express in an action against the French 16-gun schooner Cygne and two schooners off the Pearl Rock, Saint-Pierre, Martinique. The British eventually succeeded in destroying Cygne, but suffered heavy casualties in the process. In all, the British lost some 12 men killed, 31 wounded, and 26 missing (drowned or prisoners) for little gain. Epervier suffered no losses. In 1847 the Admiralty authorized the award of the Naval General Service Medal with the clasp "Off The Pearl Rock 13 Decr. 1808" to the then living survivors of the battle. Later in December Tucker transferred to Cherub.

== Fate ==
Commanders Thomas Barclay and James P. Stewart, and possibly Lt. M. de Courcy (acting). commanded her briefly. On 4 September 1810 the Navy Office offered her for sale at Chatham Dockyard. Epervier was scrapped at Chatham in June 1811.
