= HMS Netley (1807) =

Brig of the Royal Navy

History

France
- Name: Déterminée
- Acquired: 1803
- Captured: 1807

United Kingdom
- Name: HMS Netley
- Acquired: 1807 by capture
- Fate: Capsized and sank 10 July 1808

General characteristics
- Type: Brig
- Tons burthen: 150 (French; of load), or 1736/94 (bm)
- Length: Overall: 82 ft 10 in (25.2 m), or 25.3m; Keel: 58 ft 6 in (17.8 m)
- Beam: 23 ft 7 in (7.2 m), or 7.1m
- Depth of hold: 11 ft 4 in (3.5 m)
- Complement: 108 (French privateer); 65 (British service)
- Armament: 14 guns (French privateer); 14 × 18-pounder carronades + 2 × 6-pounder bow guns (British service)

HMS Netley was originally the French privateer brig Déterminé, which the Royal Navy captured in 1807 and took into service. She was lost at sea on the Leeward Islands station in 1808.

== French career and capture ==
Déterminé was a privateer brig commissioned in Bayonne in October 1803, that made her first cruise in October–November. She was recommissioned at Bordeaux circa 1805.

Lloyd's List (LL) reported on 12 August 1806 that the French privateer Déterminée had captured Betsey, Selby, master, and sent her into Cayenne. Betsey had been sailing from the Cape Verde islands to Suriname, and the capture took place nearer to Surinam.

Venus captured Déterminée, of Guadeloupe, on 18 January 1807 in the Atlantic Ocean 100 leagues (261 nmi; 300 mi; 483 km) east of Barbados after a chase of 16 hours. Déterminée was pierced for 20 guns but carried 14, and had a crew of 108 men. Her captors took Déterminée into Barbadoes.

The British took Déterminée into service as HMS Netley.

== Fate ==
Netley was under the command of Lieutenant Charles Burman when she sank on 10 July 1808 when a squall caused her to capsize off Barbados. Of her crew of about 60 only a midshipman and eight crewmen survived until the 16-gun brig-sloop HMS Julia rescued them.
