= Barrosa (1811 Nantes ship) =

History

France
- Builder: Nantes
- Launched: 1810
- Captured: c.1811

United Kingdom
- Name: Barrosa
- Namesake: Battle of Barrosa (5 March 1811)
- Fate: Last listed 1819

General characteristics
- Tons burthen: 199, or 200 (bm)
- Sail plan: Brig
- Armament: 8 × 6-pounder guns

Barrosa (or Barossa, or Barosa, or Barrossa) was launched at Nantes in 1810 under another name. She was purchased in 1811 as a prize, renamed, and her new owners sailed her as a West Indiaman. A French privateer captured and released her. A year later an American privateer captured her but the Royal Navy may have recaptured her.

== Career ==
Barosa first appeared in Lloyd's Register (LR) with J.Burry, master, Carr & Co., owners, and trade Cork–Jamaica.

Capture and release: Barossa, Barry, master, arrived at Jamaica on 23 July 1811. On 29 June, as she was sailing from Cork she had encountered the privateer Duc de Dantzig off Ushant. Duc de Dantzig, of 10 guns and 176 men, had plundered Barossa and thrown her guns overboard, and had then let her proceed.

Year	Master	Owner	Trade	Source
1813	Barry	Carr & Co.	Cork–London	Register of Shipping
1813	J.Kelleker	Carr & Co.	Cork–Jamaica	LR

Capture and recapture: The American privateer Rolla captured Barrossa, Kellicker, master, and Apollo, in 1813 near Teneriffe. Barrossa was sailing from Cork to Jamaica. Apollo, of and from London, was sailing to New Providence. Rolla landed the crews at Tenerife.

By one account, the Royal Navy recaptured Barrosa, Kellekher, master, and Eliza, Gibson, master, from Bristol and Madeira to Jamaica, both prizes to Rolla, and sent them into Bermuda. (Note: Eliza, of 251 tons (bm) was launched at Königsberg in 1804. The entry for her in Lloyd's Register in 1814 carried the annotation "captured".) Accounts in the U.S. press reported that Borosso, of six guns, of Cork, had been carrying dry goods, beef, and candles. They also reported that Barrosa, of six guns, from Cork, had arrived at Martha's Vineyard, and that her cargo was valued at £40,000 sterling.

Eliza, of 10 guns, of Bristol, had been carrying 20,000 bushels of wheat. HMS Grampus had recaptured Apollo, which had been carrying ordnance stores.

Barrosa was last listed in the Register of Shipping in 1819, but with stale data.
