= HMS Stork (1796) =

Sloop of the Royal Navy

- Stork

History

Great Britain
- Name: HMS Stork
- Ordered: 6 November 1794
- Builder: Deptford Dockyard
- Laid down: December 1795
- Launched: 29 November 1796
- Completed: 3 August 1797 at Deptford Dockyard
- Commissioned: December 1796
- Out of service: Sold 30 May 1816
- Honours and awards: Naval General Service Medal with clasp "Martinique"

General characteristics
- Class & type: 16-gun Cormorant-class ship sloop
- Tons burthen: 426 92/94 (bm)
- Length: 108 ft 4 in (33.0 m) (gun deck); 90 ft 8 3/8 in (27.6 m) (keel)
- Beam: 29 ft 9 in (9.1 m)
- Depth of hold: 9 ft 0 in (2.7 m)
- Propulsion: Sails
- Sail plan: Sloop
- Complement: 121
- Armament: Upper deck: 16 × 6-pdrs + 12 × 1/2-pdr swivels

HMS Stork was a 16-gun ship sloop of the Cormorant class in the Royal Navy, ordered in November 1794 to a joint design by Sir John Henslow and William Rule, launched in 1796 at Deptford Dockyard.

== Career ==
She was commissioned in December 1796 under Commander Richard Pearson. Under various commanding officers, she served during the rest of the French Revolutionary War and subsequently throughout the Napoleonic War, being paid off at Sheerness from service in September 1815 and sold for breaking up eight months later.

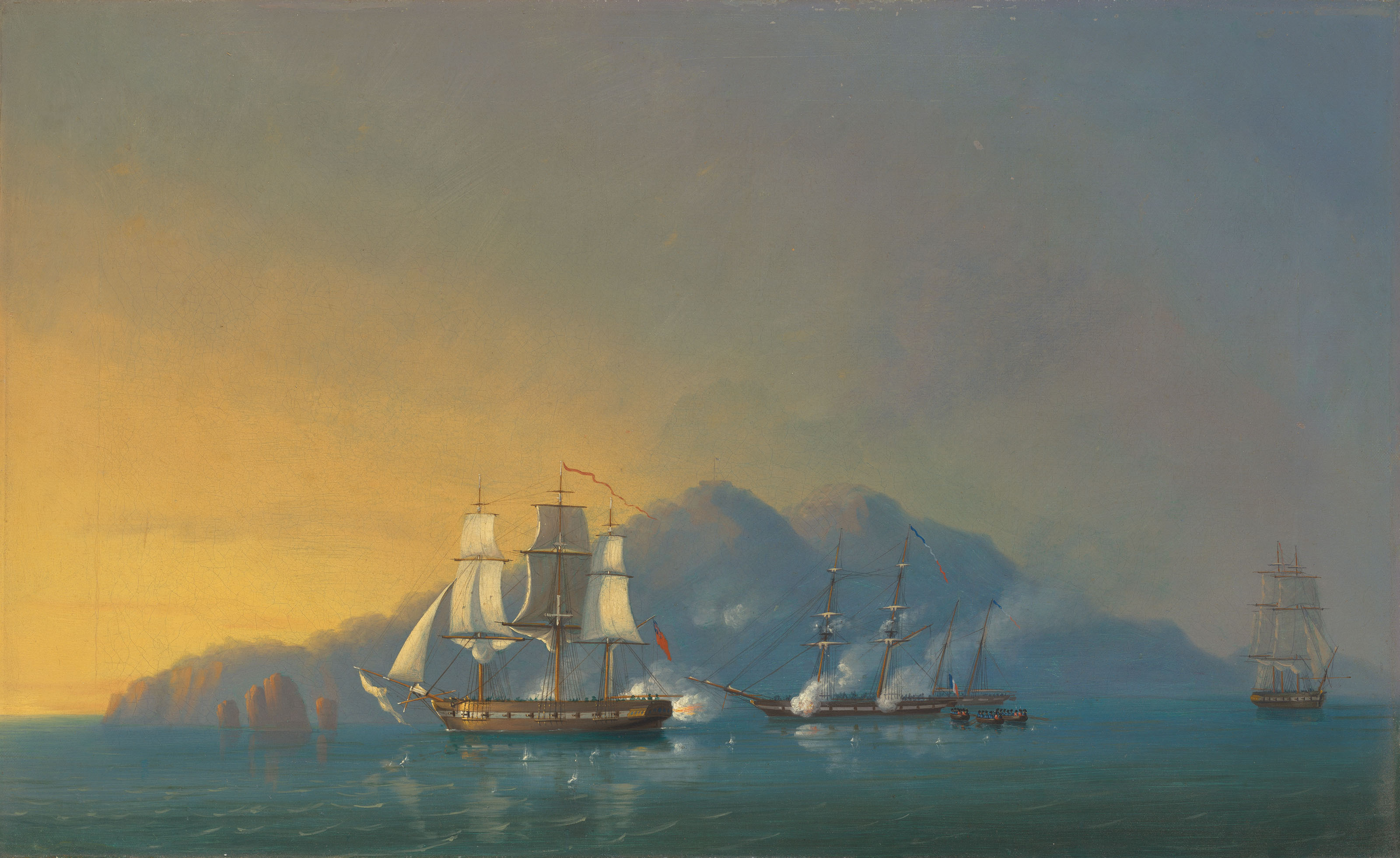
Stork engaging the French brig Cygne and two armed schooners anchored off the Pearl Rock, Martinique, on 12 December 1808. John Christian Schetky
