= HMS Latona (1781) =

Sailing frigate of the Royal Navy

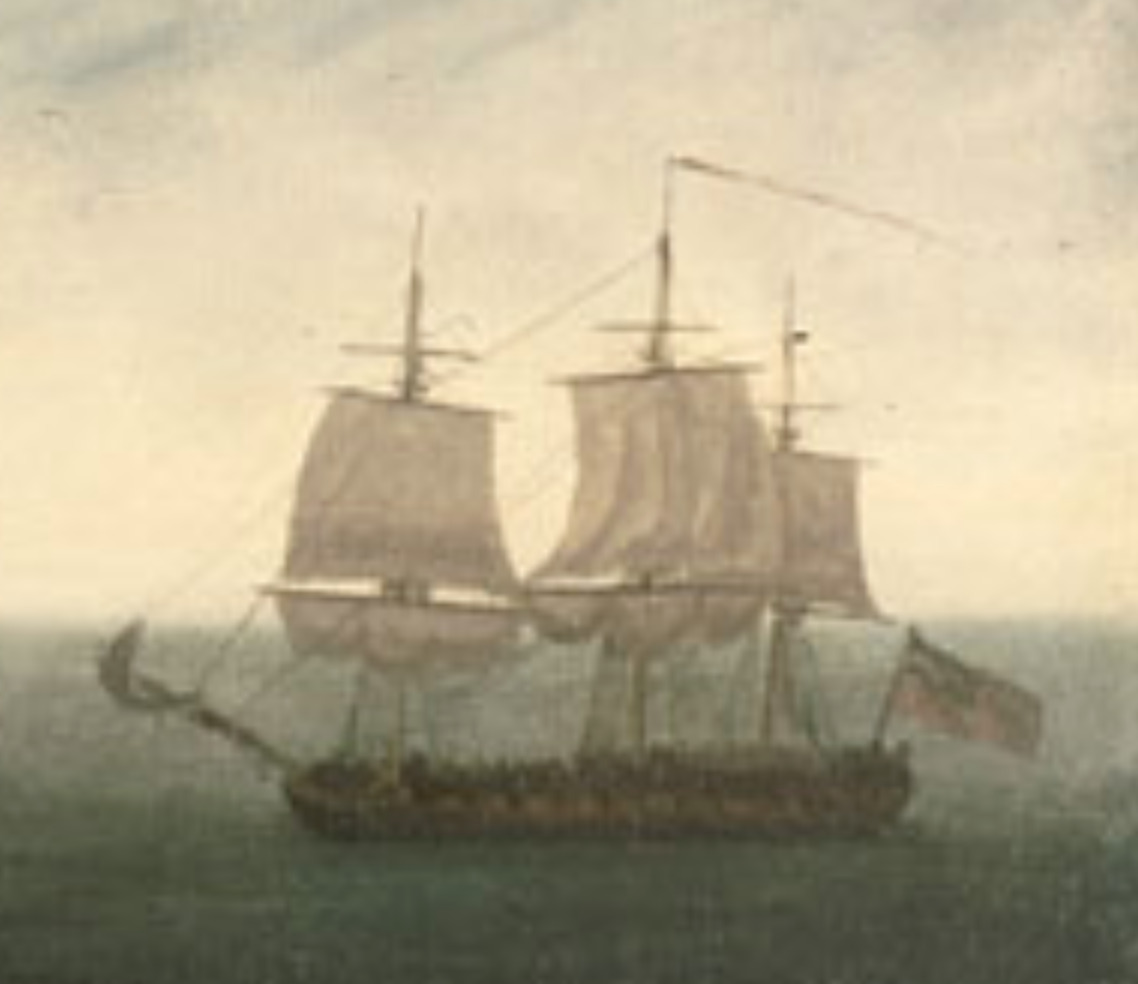
- Painting of Latona from a 1781 portrait of Sir Hyde Parker

History

Great Britain
- Name: HMS Latona
- Ordered: 22 March 1779
- Builder: Edward Greaves's yard at Limehouse
- Laid down: October 1779
- Launched: 13 March 1781
- Commissioned: March 1781
- Honours and awards: Naval General Service Medal with clasp "Curacoa 1 Jany. 1807"
- Fate: 1813 hulked. 1816 sold.

General characteristics
- Tons burthen: 944 20/94 (bm)
- Length: 141 ft 3 in (43.05 m)
- Beam: 38 ft 11 3/4 in (11.881 m)
- Depth of hold: 13 ft 6 in (4.11 m)
- Propulsion: Sail
- Complement: 270 (raised to 280 on 25 April 1780)
- Armament: UD: 28 × 18-pounder guns; QD: 8 × 6-pounder guns + 4 × 18-pounder carronades; Fc: 2 × 6-pounder guns + 4 × 18-pounder carronades; Also 14 swivels

HMS Latona was a 36-gun, fifth-rate frigate of the Royal Navy that served during the American Revolutionary War, the French Revolutionary Wars, and the Napoleonic Wars. Shortly after her launch in 1781, she participated in the Battle of Dogger Bank against a Dutch squadron in the North Sea. In September 1782, Latona took part in the relief of Gibraltar and was the first ship in the convoy to pass through the Straits, when Richard Howe sent her ahead, to spy on the condition of the Franco-Spanish fleet in Algeciras Bay.

Late in 1792, when the British began re-arming in anticipation of another war with France, Latona underwent a refit and was recommissioned for the Channel Fleet. On 18 November 1793, she spotted, chased and engaged a squadron of six ships-of-the-line and some smaller vessels. She was unable to detain the enemy ships for long and they escaped before the rest of the British fleet could catch up. Still with Howe's fleet in May 1794, Latona and her compatriots were waiting for a large grain convoy bound for France from the United States. The British eventually found what they were looking for off Ushant on 28 May, and began a running battle which ended three days later on the Glorious First of June. Latona escaped serious damage despite being actively involved in the battle, coming to the assistance of the ship-of-the-line HMS Bellerophon and firing on two French 74s before towing her to safety.

Latona operated with a British squadron in the Anglo-Russian invasion of Holland during August 1799, and was present at the Vlieter Incident, when a Dutch squadron surrendered without resistance. She subsequently served in the Baltic before being decommissioned and laid up in ordinary, shortly after the Treaty of Amiens. Hostilities resumed in May 1803, but Latona was not brought back into service until the end of 1804. In April 1806, she was sent to the West Indies and was part of a small squadron of four frigates that captured Curaçao, on 1 January 1807. Sailing into the harbour second, behind HMS Arethusa, she helped the British frigate capture the 36-gun Kenau Hasselar before putting men ashore to storm the town and its defences.

When the 40-gun Junon escaped a blockade of the Îles des Saintes in February 1809, she was pursued by Latona, a second frigate and two brigs. As the French frigate engaged the 14-gun HMS Superieure, Latona caught up and forced her to strike. A French expedition to the Caribbean under Amable Troude in April also found itself trapped when it stopped at the Îles des Saintes. When the islands were captured by a force under Major-General Frederick Maitland, the French squadron was forced to flee. Latona, the ship-of-the-line HMS Pompee and the frigate HMS Castor went after the 74-gun D'Hautpoul which struck two days later, when more British ships appeared on the horizon. Latona was converted to a troopship in May 1810 then hulked in 1813. In October that year, she began service as a receiving ship at Leith, then in December, she was recommissioned as a warship and used as the flagship of Admiral Sir William Johnstone Hope. She was sold in 1816.

== Design ==
Latona was a 36-gun frigate designed by the senior surveyor John Williams and ordered on 22 March 1779. Her keel, of 116 feet 10 inches (35.6 m) was laid down at Limehouse in November 1782 by the shipwright company, Greaves and Purnell. When finished, she was 141 feet 3 inches (43.1 m) along the gun deck, had a beam of 38 feet 11 3/4 inches (11.9 m) and a depth in the hold of 13 feet 6 inches (4.1 m). She was 94420/94 tons burthen and drew between 10 ft 1 1/2 in (3.086 m) and 13 ft 11 1/2 in (4.255 m).

The frigate was initially designed to carry a main battery of twenty-eight 18-pounder (8.2 kg) guns, with a secondary armament of ten 6-pounder (2.7 kg) guns on the upperworks. On 30 September the armament was increased by the addition of ten 18-pounder carronades, although only eight were fitted, and fourteen 1/2-pounder (0.23 kg) swivel guns. Then on 25 April 1780, it was decided to upgrade the six-pound long guns with 9 pounders (4.1 kg).

In this era it was common for each surveyor to produce independent designs for new ship types, and this design was a counterpoint to Edward Hunt's HMS Minerva; together the two draughts represent the prototype of the thirty-eight gun, 18-pounder armed frigate.

Latona was launched on 13 March 1781 and taken down the Thames to Deptford where she was fitted-out and coppered between 15 March and 21 April. Latona's build and first fitting cost the Admiralty £22,470.3.5d.

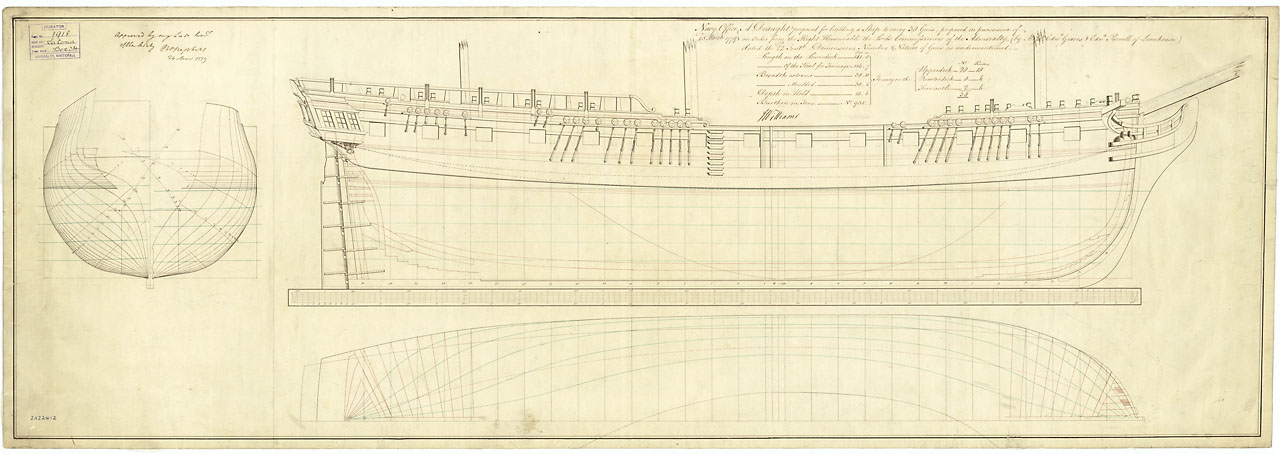
Admiralty drawing of Latona, 1781

== Early service ==
Latona was commissioned in March 1781, and in the August following, she participated in the Battle of Dogger Bank under the command of Captain Hyde Parker. His father, Vice-Admiral Sir Hyde Parker, 5th Baronet, commanded the fleet at the battle. Great Britain had declared war on the Dutch Republic in December 1780, following the latter's refusal to cease trading with emerging United States. Since then, the British had been blockading the Dutch coast while protecting its own merchant shipping. Latona was one of the escorts accompanying a convoy of ships from the Baltic on 5 August. At 04:00, a Dutch fleet was seen. Admiral Hyde Parker immediately dispatched his convoy toward the English coast, and ordered a general chase. The Dutch admiral, Johan Zoutman, chose to keep his convoy under his lee. After a bloody battle with casualties high on both sides, the Dutch returned to Texel, whence they came.

Relief of Gibraltar by Earl Howe, 11 October 1782, by Richard Paton

After November 1781, Latona was in the English Channel under Lord Hugh Conway, and on 25 April 1782 she captured a privateer, Bernardin. Latona was part of Richard Howe's fleet in the summer of 1782 and took part in the relief of Gibraltar in September. The supply ships left England on 11 September, escorted by Howe's 34 ships-of-the-line. While rounding Cape St Vincent, on 8 October, Latona was dispatched to report on the condition of the Franco-Spanish fleet in the bay of Algeciras. It was known that this force of about 48 ships-of-the-line was poised to attack Gibraltar and, even if no attack was forthcoming, would pose a significant obstacle to Howe's relief mission. She returned two days later with news that an attack had already taken place and had been beaten off. The convoy entered the straits, and successfully delivered the vital supplies, food, and ammunition to the besieged, between 16 and 18 October. The large combined French and Spanish fleet, which had been blown off station, appeared on 19 October but was lured away by Howe's fleet the following day. The faster British ships, never intending to give battle, were easily able to withdraw after a short engagement.

Latona paid off in April 1783 but was recommissioned the following month under Thomas Boston and, in November, she sailed for the Leeward Islands. Command passed successively to Charles Sandys in May 1784 then Lieutenant Velters Cornewall Berkeley in March 1786. The latter held the position until the ship paid off once again, in October. Latona was laid up for some time before, in November 1788, work began at Woolwich to make her ready for sea once more. £15,978.0.0d was spent on extensive repairs and a refit. She was recommissioned in May 1790 by Albemarle Bertie but by the end of the year, she had been removed from service.

Late in 1792, anticipating that it would soon be forced to enter the war in Europe, Britain began military preparations. In December, Latona was recommissioned under Edward Thornbrough and following a £12,644.0.0d refit, began service in The Channel in January 1793. She captured a French privateer, Amerique, in March and two more in May; Franklin and Ambitieux of ten guns apiece.

== French Revolutionary Wars ==
In July 1793, Latona was attached to Richard Howe's Channel fleet. Howe's 22 ships-of-the-line and accompanying frigates were returning from a cruise in the Bay of Biscay on 18 November, when Latona signalled the presence of enemy ships in Cancale Bay. They turned out to be a French squadron of six ships-of-the-line, two frigates and two smaller craft out of Brest. Mistaking the British for a convoy they were expecting, the French ships began to sail towards their foe but soon realised their error and fled. Using his frigates to keep the enemy in sight, Howe set off in pursuit, but only Latona got close enough to engage. Coming up on the rearmost ships in the afternoon, she was eventually driven off when two French ships-of-the-line joined the action. In an attempt to catch up, some off the British ships were carrying too much sail; causing their topmasts to break. The chase was therefore abandoned. Although the French squadron was seen again on 19 November, bad weather prevented Howe staying in touch and the French were soon lost from sight. A few days later, on 27 November, Latona was in a squadron under the command of Captain Thomas Pasley of the 74-gun HMS Bellerophon, which captured the 28-gun privateer, Blonde off Ushant. (Note: At the time of her capture Blonde was armed with 28 guns and had a crew of 210 men under the command of Citizen Gueria. A subsequent prize-money notice listed the vessels that shared in the proceeds as Bellerophon, Vanguard, Phoenix, Latona, and Phaeton. Some sources, such as; Dictionnaire des bâtiments de la flotte de guerre française de Colbert à nos jours by Jean-Michel Roche, the British Warships in the Age of Sail series by Rif Winfield and La Marine de Louis XVI: Nomenclature des Navires Français de 1774 À 1792 by Alain Demerliac, attribute the capture of Blonde to Latona and Phaeton alone.)

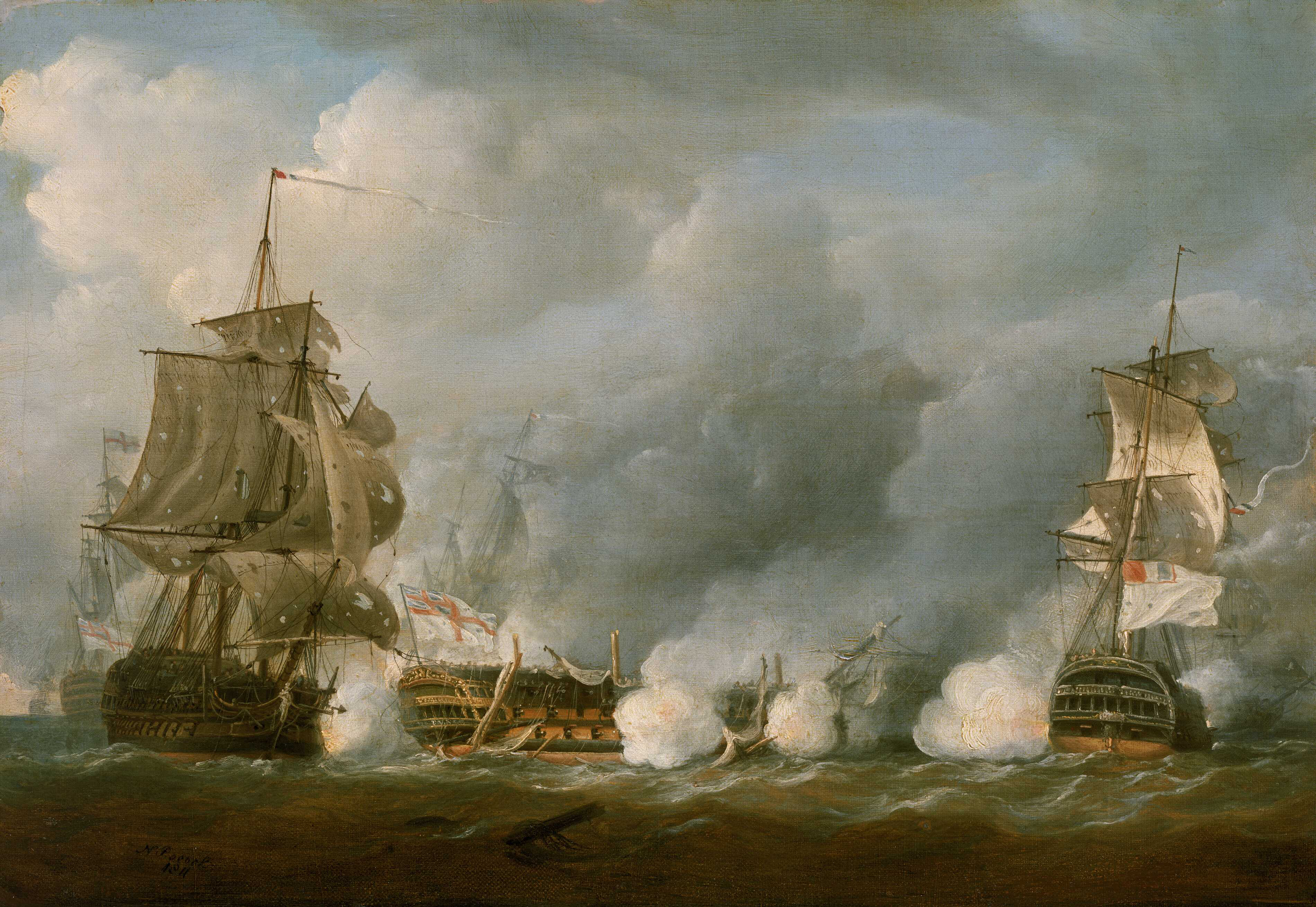
The 'Defence' at the Battle of the First of June, 1794 by Nicholas Pocock

Still with the Channel fleet in May 1794, Latona and her compatriots were waiting for a large grain convoy bound for France from the United States. Howe's fleet arrived off Ushant on 5 May and the frigates Latona and Phaeton were tasked with circumnavigating the island and looking in the Brest roads for the French fleet. When they returned to report the French were still in port, Howe set off to try and intercept the convoy before it could gain the protection of the Brest fleet. After almost two weeks spent searching the shipping lanes and finding nothing, the British fleet returned and on 19 May, Phaeton and Latona were again dispatched to monitor the roads.

After finding the anchorage empty, the two frigates stopped an American vessel and learnt from the crew that the French fleet had sailed three days earlier. On the same day (19 May), the frigate HMS Venus joined Howes' fleet with news that a British squadron, under George Montagu, desperately needed reinforcements. The next day, after Latona and Phaeton's return, Howes' fleet set off to rendezvous with Montagu and on the morning of 21 May, encountered a former Dutch convoy, taken by the French two days previous. Howe's ships managed to recapture about half, but unable to spare the men, Howe had his prizes burned. Realising now that the French fleet was nearby and that Montagu was safe, Howe abandoned his previous plan and set off in pursuit.

The British found their quarry on 28 May, some 400 nautical miles (700 km) west of Ushant, and engaged in a running battle, culminating on 1 June 1794. And, although seven French ships were captured or sunk without the British losing any, the vital grain convoy arrived in France without significant loss. The killed and wounded among the British fleet amounted to 2,048. Casualties from the six French prizes alone were upwards of 1,200 and it is estimated that among the French fleet, 7,000 men were killed, wounded or taken prisoner. Latona did not lose any of her crew despite being actively involved in the battle when, at 08:45 she came to the assistance of Bellerophon, firing on two French 74s before towing her to safety.

There was a change of command and duty for Latona in September, when under Arthur Legge, she was part of a royal escort for Princess Caroline of Brunswick.

Then a few days later, on 3 December, Latona captured the French brig Intrepide 40 leagues (190 km) west-north-west of Lisbon. She was pierced for 18 guns but carried twelve 6-pounders, an 18-pounder carronade, and a brass 12-pounder gun. During the chase she threw all her guns overboard except for the 12-pounder and one 6-pounder, both of which she used as stern chasers, firing, but without effect, until Latona was almost alongside. She had a crew of 83 men aboard, under the command of M. Jean Candeau. On her cruise she had captured only one vessel, a galliot belonging to Bremen, which had been sailing from Faro to Liverpool with a cargo of fruit.

John Bligh assumed command in May 1797 when Latona served as flagship to Admiral William Waldegrave. At the end of the month, she set sail for Newfoundland, where the Admiral was to serve as the newly appointed governor. In November Frank Sotheron became Latona's captain and on 29 November was off Portugal when she captured the French Bordeaux-based privateer schooner Aigle about 107 leagues (520 km) north by west from Lisbon. Aigle had sailed from near Bayonne, on 6 November, but had captured nothing. She was pierced for 14 guns but carried only 12 small carriage guns, and had a crew of 62 men under the command of Francis Harimendy. Latona returned to England in February 1798 but was brought back to the West Indies in April and remained on that station for much of the remaining year. Sometime in late 1778 she fired a broadside into American merchantman "Aurora", her captain later claim the broadside wasn't ordered. In December, she was back home once more.

=== War of the Second Coalition ===
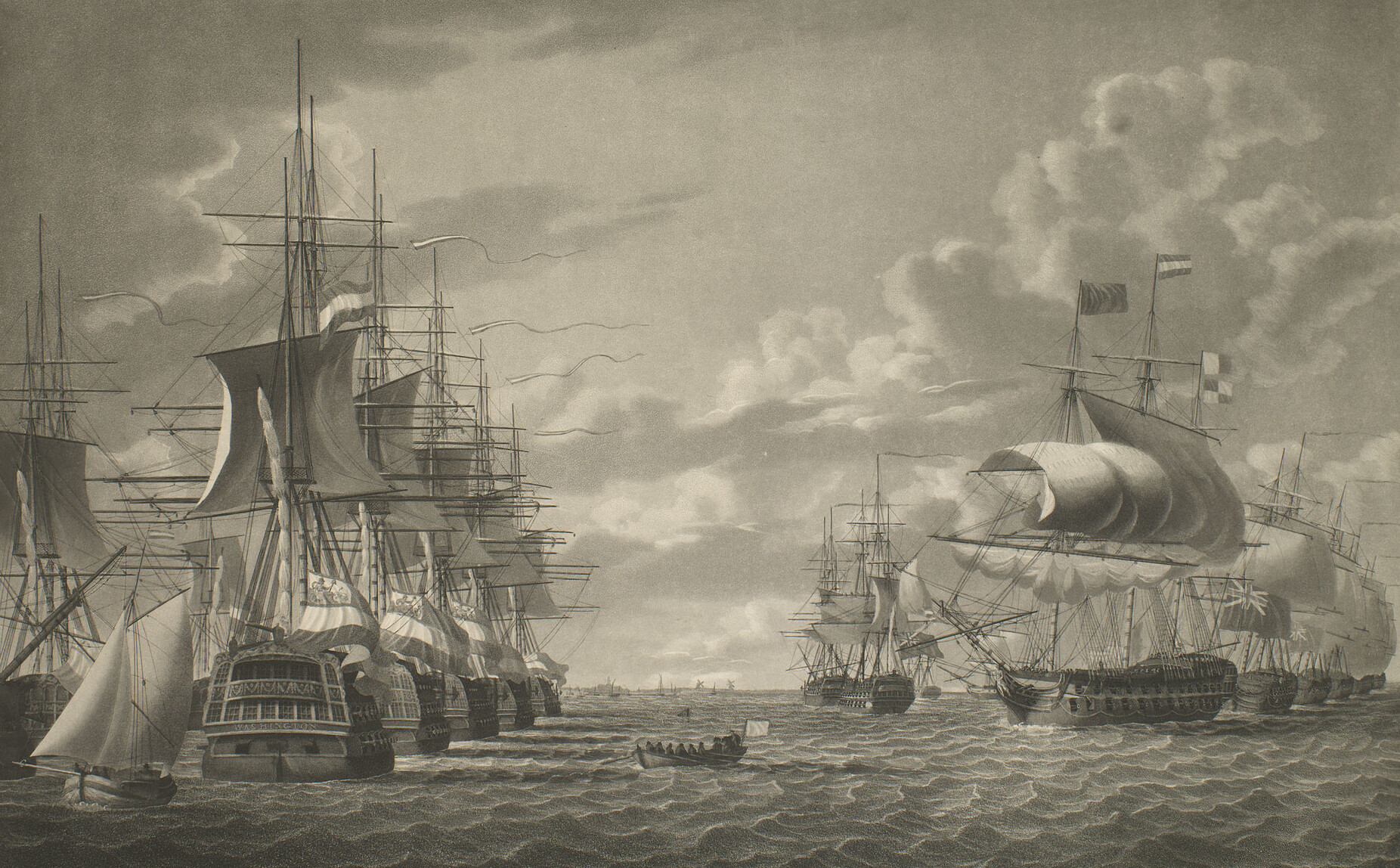
Surrender of the Dutch squadron on 30 August in the Vlieter, engraving by Robert Dodd

Between 8 March 1799 and 12 May, Latona captured many small Dutch vessels. (Note: Prize money was paid in November 1811. A first-class share was worth £7 7s 8d; a fifth-class share, that of a seaman, was worth 5d.) Latona operated with a British squadron in the Anglo-Russian invasion of Holland during August 1799 which resulted in the surrender of a Dutch squadron in the Vlieter roads. A combined fleet under Admiral Lord Duncan, comprising eight ships-of-the-line, three fourth rates and six frigates, one of which was Latona, arrived off Texel on 22 August. With it, were more than 230 other craft, carrying supplies and 27,000 troops. After failing to persuade the Dutch to hand over their ships, the troops were landed near Helder on the morning of 27 August. After an engagement with a Franco-Dutch force, the city was captured. At the same time, a single British frigate, HMS Circe, entered the Nieuwe Diep and captured the ships there which were laid up in ordinary. Among them were 13 warships carrying a total of 510 guns, and of these, four small frigates and a 44-gun vessel were added to the Royal Navy. Two days later, a British squadron under Vice-Admiral Andrew Mitchell entered the Vlieter roads where a Dutch squadron under Vice-Admiral Samuel Story was anchored. Latona and two other frigates grounded in the narrow channel, but all managed to get off and join their compatriots in line opposite the Dutch, who accepted an offer to surrender and handed over their ships.

Latona was operating on the Lisbon station towards the end of the year, where she captured two privateers: the 12-gun Aigle on 29 November, and the 14-gun Intrepide on 3 December. In 1800, she was reassigned to the North Sea where in April, off Flamborough, she took the 14-gun privateer Virginie. Following a spell in the Baltic Sea, early in 1801, Latona was at Deptford in October before joining the Channel Fleet in 1802. This was another short-lived appointment: Latona returned to the Baltic and was stationed off St Petersburg from August to October. She then sailed back to England and paid off.

== Napoleonic Wars ==
Having been laid up in ordinary since October 1802, Latona required substantial repair before returning to service. The work was undertaken at Deptford between April and October 1804; after which she was taken into the Channel, by Thomas Le Marchant Gosselin, who had taken command in August. Latona captured the Spanish ketch Amphion, armed with 12 guns and 70 men, at sea on 22 October 1805.

In April 1806, Latona was under Captain James Wood, and in June, she had her carronades upgraded to 32 pounders (15 kg). She was then sent to Jamaica where, later in the year, she was part of a small squadron sent by James Dacres, to ascertain the willingness of the population of Curaçao to enter into an alliance. Latona with the razee HMS Anson and the frigate HMS Arethusa, left Port Royal on 29 November with orders to enlist the 38-gun HMS Fisgard, then somewhere at sea. The three vessels, under the command of Charles Brisbane in Arethusa, arrived in Aruba on 22 December, having been held back by unfavourable winds and tides, and were joined the following day by Fisgard.

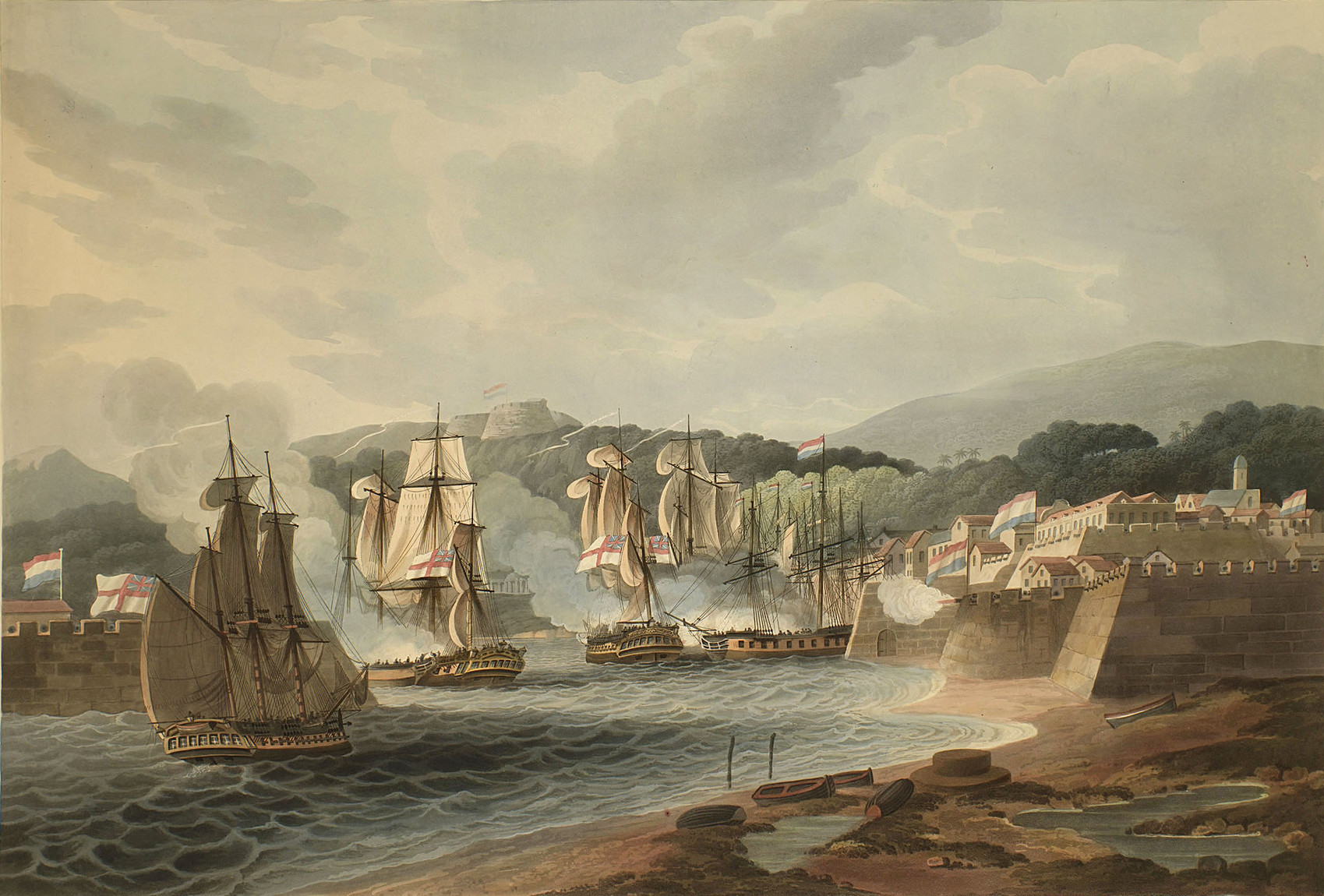
The capture of Curaçao, depicted by Edward Orme

The expedition left on 24 December and arrived off Curaçao on 1 January 1807. The island was heavily defended by a chain of fortifications along the high ground, that also overlooked the harbour. Fort Amsterdam, had 60 guns guarding the entrance, and inside, the guns of a second large fort, Fort Republick, covered the entire anchorage. With such a small force at his disposal, Brisbane thought a peaceful solution unlikely and, in order that he might begin negotiations from a position of strength, sailed his ships straight into the harbour.

Arethusa led under a flag of truce, which the Dutch ignored, Latona second, followed by Anson and Fisgard, the latter grounding after a shift of wind. At 06:15, the British still coming under heavy fire, the flag of truce was taken down and an action started on the ships in the harbour. Arethusa fired three broadsides into the 36-gun frigate, Kenau Hasselar, before Brisbane led a boarding party. Shortly after, Latona drew alongside and the Dutch ship was taken. In the meantime, men from Anson boarded and captured the 22-gun Suriname. Two schooners were also seized in the battle.

Sailors from all four British frigates went ashore at 07:30, storming Fort Amsterdam, which was successfully overcome in about ten minutes, before taking the town and its citadel. After which, at 09:30, they returned to their ships and, after half an hour, had pounded Fort Republik into submission. By noon, the whole island had capitulated. Latona lost one man killed and two wounded; in all, the British lost three killed and 14 wounded. The Dutch lost nearly 200 men. On the ships alone, six men were killed, including Commandant Cornelius J. Evertz, who commanded the Dutch naval force in Curaçao and seven wounded, of whom one died later. Latona's captain, Wood, was knighted for his part in the action, as was Brisbane. The Patriotic Fund gave each of the four captains a gold medal and a gift; Wood received a vase valued at £105.0.0d. Several promotions were given to the lesser officers and in 1849, the Admiralty awarded the Naval General Service Medal with clasp "Curacoa 1 Jany. 1807" to surviving claimants. (Note: On 3 December 1808, the London Gazette reported a disputed claim for prize money from a fifth vessel, Morne Fortunee. Neither the original reports nor the accounts of William James and William Laird Clowes acknowledge this ship as being at the capture of Curaçao. By 1849, when the Admiralty awarded the Naval General Service Medal, Morne Fortunee was listed together with the four frigates. 65 medals were given out.)

Latona was part of the squadron under Admiral Sir Alexander Cochrane that captured the Danish islands of St Thomas on 22 December and Santa Cruz on 25 December 1807. The Danes did not resist and the invasion was bloodless.

Under the command of Hugh Pigot, Latona was at the action of 10 February 1809, where she was involved in the capture of the French 40-gun frigate Junon. On 7 February, Junon escaped from a British blockade of the Îles des Saintes. She was seen and chased by two small brigs, one of which soon fell behind but the other, HMS Superieure of 14-guns, kept her in sight and was joined on the 9th by Latona; the crew of which had been alerted by the sound of gunfire. The next day, Junon was still some way ahead of her pursuers when two more British ships, the 38-gun HMS Horatio and the 18-gun HMS Driver, appeared and caused her to alter her course. Seeing Latona steering to cut her off, Junon turned back towards Horatio, passing her on the opposite tack and exchanging fire. A short engagement followed in which both frigates were greatly damaged but Junon, less so in the sails and rigging, was able to leave Horatio behind. She was then attacked by Superiere until Latona caught up and opened fire. Junon's main and mizzen mast fell and she struck.

In April 1809, a French squadron under Amable Troude, comprising three 74s and two armed-storeships, arrived at the Îles des Saintes. There they were blockaded until 14 April, when a British force under Major-General Frederick Maitland and Captain Philip Beaver in Acasta, invaded and captured the islands. Latona was among the naval vessels that shared in the proceeds of the capture of the islands. (Note: The prize agent for a number of the vessels involved, Henry Abbott, went bankrupt. In May 1835 there was a final payment of a dividend from his estate. A first-class share was worth 10s 2 3/4d; a sixth-class share, that of an ordinary seaman, was worth 1d. Seventh-class (landsmen) and eighth-class (boys) shares were fractions of a penny, too small to pay.) The French squadron was obliged to quit its position, after the British established a battery on the mountain overlooking the anchorage. Despite leaving under cover of darkness, Troude's ships were noticed by the 18-gun HMS Hazard, which immediately alerted the rest of the blockading force. At 22:00, two hours later, two British vessels, HMS Pompee of 74 guns and the 18-gun Recruit, came close enough to open fire on D'Hautpoul, the rearmost French ship. Soon after, HMS Neptune joined the attack but none of the shots, all fired from distance, did any damage and the French began to draw away. Only Recruit stayed in touch, harrying her quarry throughout the night and following day until Pompee rejoined the action on the evening of the 15th and caused the three French 74s to scatter. Pompee continued her pursuit of D'Hautpoul and was joined by Latona and the 32-gun HMS Castor the next day. On 17 April, further British ships appeared and at 17:15 D'Hautpoul struck. The other two French 74s managed to escape to Cherbourg, having been chased by Recruit and Neptune when the squadron dispersed on 15 April.

D'Hautpoul was taken into the Royal Navy as HMS Abercromby. The French had had 80–90 men killed or wounded during the action, the British had 10 killed and 35 wounded. The majority of the British casualties occurred on Pompee. The two French storeships, Furieuse and Félicité, left the Îles des Saintes on 15 April, the day after Troude's line-of-battle ships. They made it to Gaudeloupe unmolested but when they left on 14 June, they were pursued by Latona and the 16-gun sloop, HMS Cherub. Félicité succumbed to Latona after a four-day chase; Furieuse managed to out-sail Cherub but was eventually taken by Bonne Citoyenne on 6 July.

== Later service and fate ==
In May 1810, work began at Woolwich to convert Latona to a troopship. The alterations took until July, during which time she had her armament reduced to a main battery of fourteen 9-pounder (4.1 kg) guns, with two 6 pounders (2.7 kg) on the forecastle, and six 18-pounder (8.2 kg) carronades on the quarterdeck. She served in this capacity until 1813, first under Charles Sotheby on the Lisbon station, then from April 1812, under Edward Rodney. She was then placed in ordinary at Sheerness. In July 1813, she was briefly recommissioned by Mathew Buckle, and re-established with an armament of sixteen 24-pounder (11 kg) carronades, before being fitted as a receiving ship for service at Leith. In December 1813, Latona was recommissioned as a warship by Andrew Smith, as the flagship of Admiral Sir William Johnstone Hope; an appointment she held until she was sold in May 1816 for £2,550.0.0d
