= Troude's expedition to the Caribbean =

Naval operation of the Napoleonic wars

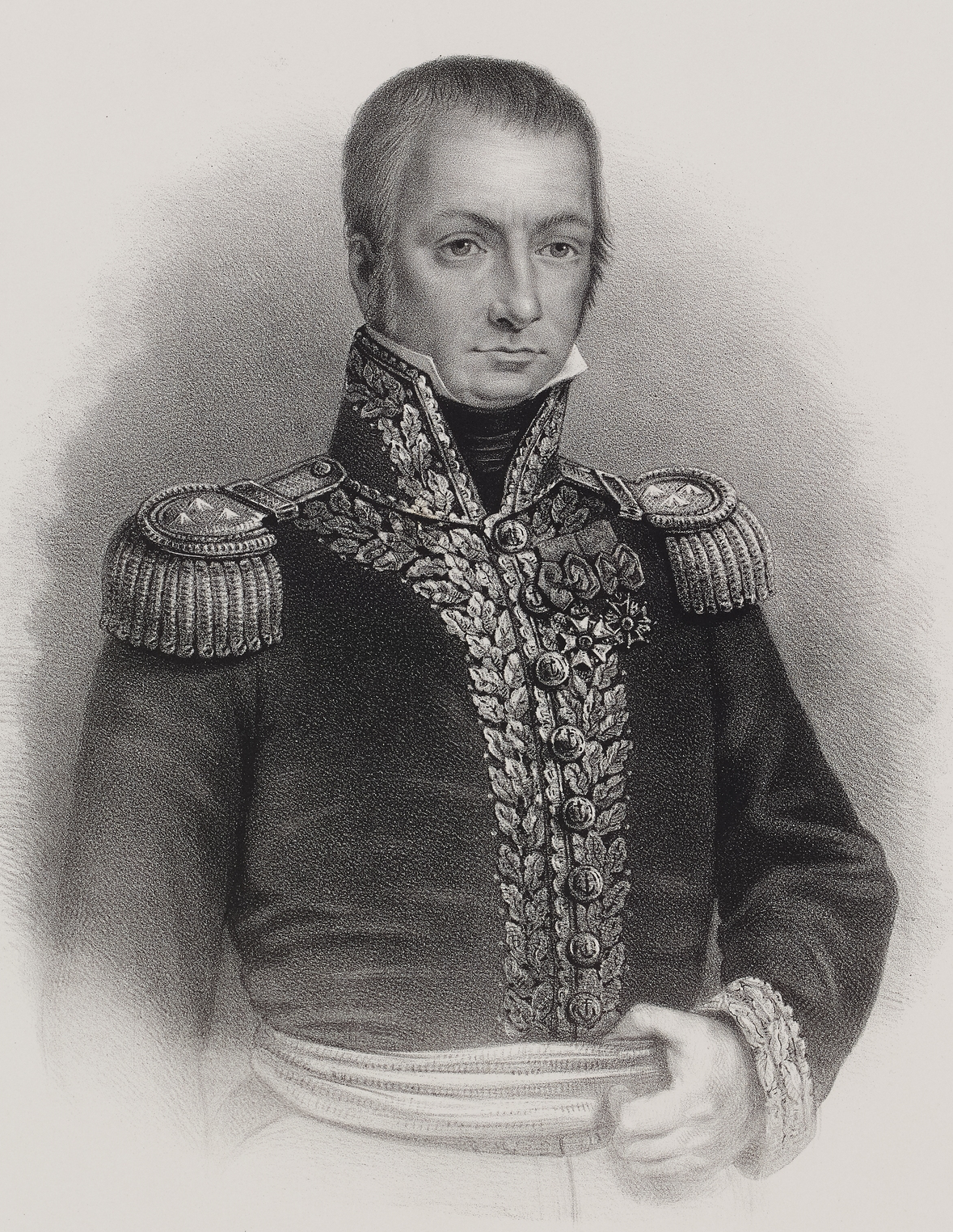
Amable Troude, the commander of the expedition

Troude's expedition to the Caribbean was a naval operation by a French force under Commodore Amable Troude during the Napoleonic Wars. The French squadron departed from Lorient in February 1809 in an attempt to reach and resupply the island colony of Martinique in the Caribbean Sea, then under invasion from a British expeditionary force. The force arrived much too late to affect the outcome of the successful invasion and took shelter from a British squadron in the Îles des Saintes, where they were blockaded by part of the British invasion fleet, led by Vice-Admiral Sir Alexander Cochrane. Two weeks after the French ships arrived, British troops invaded and captured the Saintes, constructing mortar batteries to bombard the French squadron. With his position unsustainable, Troude decided to break out.

Attempting to escape under cover of darkness on 14 April, the French squadron was spotted by a number of small British ships stationed close inshore. These ships raised the alarm and the main British squadron followed in pursuit. The rearmost French ship of the line, D'Hautpoul, was closely followed by the small brig HMS Recruit, which succeeded in delaying D'Hautpoul long enough that the main British squadron was able to attack and overwhelm her in a running battle that lasted three days and ended off the coast of Puerto Rico. The British suffered 45 casualties, the French nearly 100. The remainder of the French squadron escaped, with the two surviving ships of the line sailing directly for France, eventually reaching Cherbourg in May.

The French expedition's two frigates, both only partially armed, were detached during the action and took shelter in harbour at Guadeloupe. In June, heavily laden with trade goods, they attempted to escape to Europe, but were pursued by elements of the British blockade force. Félicité was overrun after four days of manoeuvre, submitting to the more powerful British frigate HMS Latona without a fight. Furieuse was able to escape immediate pursuit, but was subsequently discovered on 3 July by the smaller British ship HMS Bonne Citoyenne. In a fierce engagement two days later, the small British ship was able to defeat and capture the French vessel, which was later commissioned into the Royal Navy.

== Background ==
During the Napoleonic Wars, the French Navy suffered a series of defeats at the hands of the British Royal Navy, culminating in the destruction of much of their Mediterranean Fleet at the Battle of Trafalgar in 1805. Unable to compete at sea, the French were increasingly confined to their principal naval bases, especially Brest on the Biscay coast and Toulon in the Mediterranean. With British squadrons patrolling the entrances to these ports, the French found it difficult not only to conduct regular overseas trade, but also to supply and reinforce their overseas colonies. As a result, the colonies faced financial collapse and the constant threat of attack by British forces, especially in the Caribbean, where by 1809 their island colonies of Martinique and Guadeloupe were surrounded by British held islands and blockaded by a strong British fleet under Vice-Admiral Sir Alexander Cochrane.

During the summer of 1808, messages arrived in France from Martinique, outlining the desperate situation of their supplies, morale and economy. It was determined that reinforcements and food supplies would be sent and the frigate Thétis was despatched in November 1808. Within days, Thétis had been captured at the action of 10 November 1808, and subsequent operations had mixed success: the frigate Amphitrite reached Martinique, but a number of smaller ships were intercepted and defeated, both in Europe and the West Indies. In desperation, a major operation was planned, intended to transport substantial supplies and sufficient troops to resist the inevitable British invasion on Martinique. To this end, Commodore Amable Troude was provided with the ships of the line Courageux, Polonais and D'Hautpoul, with the frigates Félicité and Furieuse en flûte as armed storeships, carrying the bulk of the supplies.

On 21 February 1809, a large French fleet under Admiral Jean-Baptiste Willaumez attempted to escape Brest and was chased by the blockade squadron and driven to shelter under the Ile d'Aix. Shortly afterwards, three French frigates attempted to break out of Lorient, but were challenged and destroyed at the action of 24 February 1809. These operations were the preliminaries to the Battle of Basque Roads in April, but also provided the cover required for Troude's force to escape Lorient while the British were engaged elsewhere. Travelling rapidly across the Atlantic, the French encountered no British warships but were able to seize a number of lone British merchant ships, from whom Troude learned that the invasion of Martinique was already underway. While Troude's expedition had been preparing at Lorient, Cochrane had been preparing his own operation to Martinique, following the interception of the same despatches warning of the island's low morale and preparedness in the summer of 1808. Amassing an expeditionary force of 44 ships and 10,000 men at Carlisle Bay, Barbados, Cochrane began the invasion on 30 January 1809 and his troops rapidly overran the French defences, despite stiff resistance in the central highlands. By 10 February, the only remaining point in French hands was Fort Desaix, which held out until the magazine was breached on 24 February, at which point Governor Louis Thomas Villaret de Joyeuse surrendered unconditionally.

== Îles des Saintes ==
Troude was wary on his arrival in the Leeward Islands on 29 March, refusing to approach Martinique and instead anchoring near the Îles des Saintes until the situation in the islands could be established. Before he could make contact with nearby Guadeloupe, he was discovered by patrolling British warships and a warning sent to Cochrane, who was on his flagship HMS Neptune off Martinique. Within hours Neptune was cruising off the Saintes, joined by the ships of the line HMS Pompee, HMS York, HMS Belleisle, HMS Captain, HMS Polyphemus and a number of smaller warships that could operate closer inshore. Blockading the Saintes was a difficult task: the French had three channels through which they could escape, too many to be effectively blocked by the forces at Cochrane's disposal. In addition, Troude's force could not be attacked directly, the width of the channels making it impossible for the British ships to attack in full strength.

For two weeks the British and French squadrons watched one another, the British unable to attack and the French unable to escape. In an effort to break the deadlock, Cochrane sent to Martinique for a body of 3,000 men under Major-General Frederick Maitland. With this force he launched a surprise invasion of the islands on 14 April, the amphibious operation commanded by Captain Philip Beaver in HMS Acasta and executed successfully with only minor casualties. Parties of seamen went ashore in the wake of the soldiers, working rapidly to establish a battery of two 8-inch howitzers on Morne-Russell. These guns began firing during the afternoon and by 20:00 Troude had given orders for his squadron to sail through the western channel during the night.

In their efforts to monitor the French, Cochrane's squadron had become divided, so that Neptune and Pompee were the only ships within reach of Troude's squadron when they passed through the channel. Neither ship was well placed to fight the larger French force and both were taken by surprise, only alerted to the French escape by the brig HMS Hazard under Captain Hugh Cameron shortly before 22:00. Pompee was closest to the French, and Captain William Charles Fahie managed to fire two broadsides into the rearmost ship, D'Hautpoul, before Troude's squadron pulled away from her. Neptune, Pompee and the small brig HMS Recruit took up the chase, the fast Recruit annoying the French with persistent minor attacks, while Neptune came too close to D'Hautpoul and was fired on, losing one man killed and four wounded. The French escape, while necessitated by the British battery, was actually a feint: the frigates Félicité and Furieuse had remained hidden off the Saintes during the night and at 09:00 on 15 April, with the main combat continuing to the west, slipped away into Basse-Terre on Guadeloupe, chased in vain by HMS Intrepid under Captain Warwick Lake. French batteries drove off the British pursuit and the frigates were anchored in harbour and their stores successfully unloaded.

== Battle ==
Action of 14–17 April 1809
- Part of the Caribbean campaign of 1803–1810
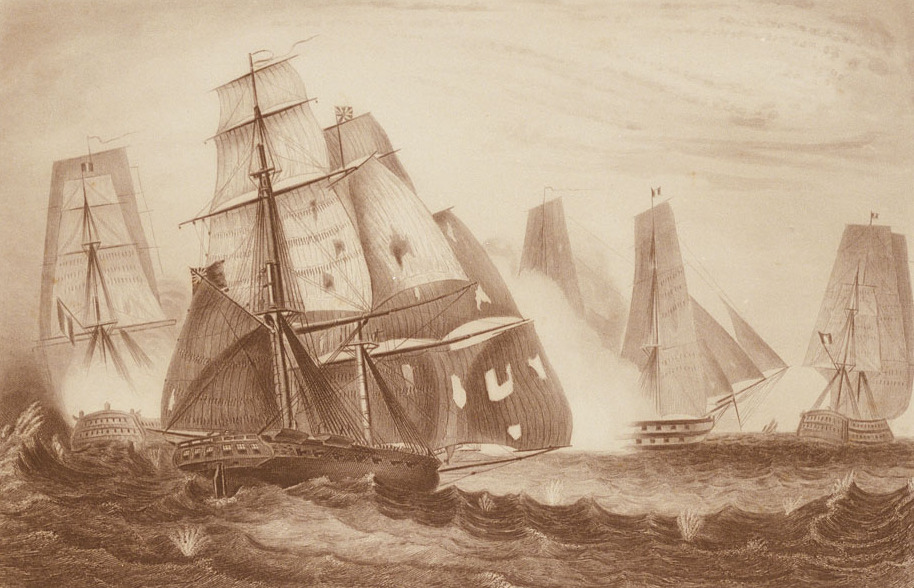
- Engraving of the battle by G. W. Terry
Date	14–17 April 1809
Location	Between Îles des Saintes and Cabo Rojo, Caribbean Sea
Result	British victory

Belligerents
United Kingdom	France

Commanders and leaders
Sir Alexander Cochrane	Amable Troude

Strength
5 ships of the line 2 frigates 1 brig-sloop	3 ships of the line 2 frigates

Casualties and losses
11 killed 40 wounded	80–90 killed or wounded 1 ship of the line captured

During the night of 14–15 April 1809, contact was maintained with the French squadron by Recruit, Captain Charles John Napier firing on the rearmost ship D'Hautpoul and coming under fire from the French stern-chasers, guns situated in the rear of a ship to fire on pursuers. Shortly after 04:00, Pompee came within range and began to fire her bow-chasers, the chase continuing westwards into the Caribbean Sea. Frustrated by her inability to escape Recruit, D'Hautpoul eventually turned and fired a broadside at 10:45, causing severe damage but failing to dissuade Napier, who immediately counter-attacked. D'Hautpoul's manoeuvre caused her to lose ground to her pursuers and throughout the day the squadrons exchanged shots, neither causing significant damage but the French being driven deeper into British held waters and unable to drive off their opponents.

At 20:00, Troude ordered D'Hautpoul to steer to the northwest while he took Courageux and Polonais southwest in an effort to divide the pursuit. Pompee and Recruit kept with D'Hautpoul, while Neptune, accompanied by the brig-sloop HMS Hawk, continued to follow Troude's main force. During the night however Troude outdistanced Neptune, and on the morning of 16 April Cochrane ordered all available ships to converge on D'Hautpoul. The lone French ship of the line had finally forced the damaged Recruit to retire, but could see Pompee and Neptune to the southeast and the newly arrived frigates HMS Latona under Captain Hugh Pigot and HMS Castor under Captain William Roberts to the northeast, with the Spanish coast of Puerto Rico directly north. During the day the chase continued, Neptune falling behind but Pompee remaining in sight and the frigates gaining on D'Hautpoul. At 17:00, Puerto Rico appeared on the horizon, the French forced to follow the coastline westwards. During the night, the British pursuers were confused by the overcast sky, which helped D'Hautpoul to partially obscure herself among the lights from shore.

At 02:45 on 17 April, Castor closed within range of D'Hautpoul and opened fire, exchanging broadsides with the much larger French ship for 75 minutes and slowing her sufficiently for Pompee to come within range. Sailing between Castor and the French ship, Fahie closed within 50 yards (46 m) and opened fire with his broadside. Within 15 minutes D'Hautpoul attempted to escape by pulling forward and engaging with Castor again, but the damage done to her sails and rigging hindered the manoeuvre and Pompee pulled across her stern, threatening to rake her. With defeat inevitable, Captain Amand Leduc surrendered, Neptune, York, Captain, Hazard, Hawk, Recruit, Polyphemus, HMS Ethalion and HMS Ringdove all coming within sight as dawn broke, joining Pompee, Castor and Latona.

=== Aftermath ===
D'Hautpoul had fought hard during the engagement and was badly damaged, suffering between 80 and 90 casualties. Pompee was also badly damaged, losing nine killed and 30 wounded, including Fahie wounded. Other casualties were suffered on Castor, with one killed and five wounded; Neptune one killed and four wounded and Recruit one wounded. In total, British losses were 11 killed and 40 wounded. Cochrane ordered Pompee and the newly captured French ship back to port, promoting Napier to command the ship of the line for his service on Recruit and despatching York and Captain to hunt for Troude's remaining squadron. Despite their efforts, Troude evaded pursuit and eventually reached Cherbourg in May. In addition to Napier there were further promotions and awards and D'Hautpoul was taken into the Royal Navy as HMS Abercromby. Four decades later the battle was among the actions recognised by a clasp attached to the Naval General Service Medal, awarded upon application to all British participants still living in 1847.

== Félicité and Furieuse ==
Actions of 14–18 June and 6 July 1809
- Part of the Caribbean campaign of 1803–1810
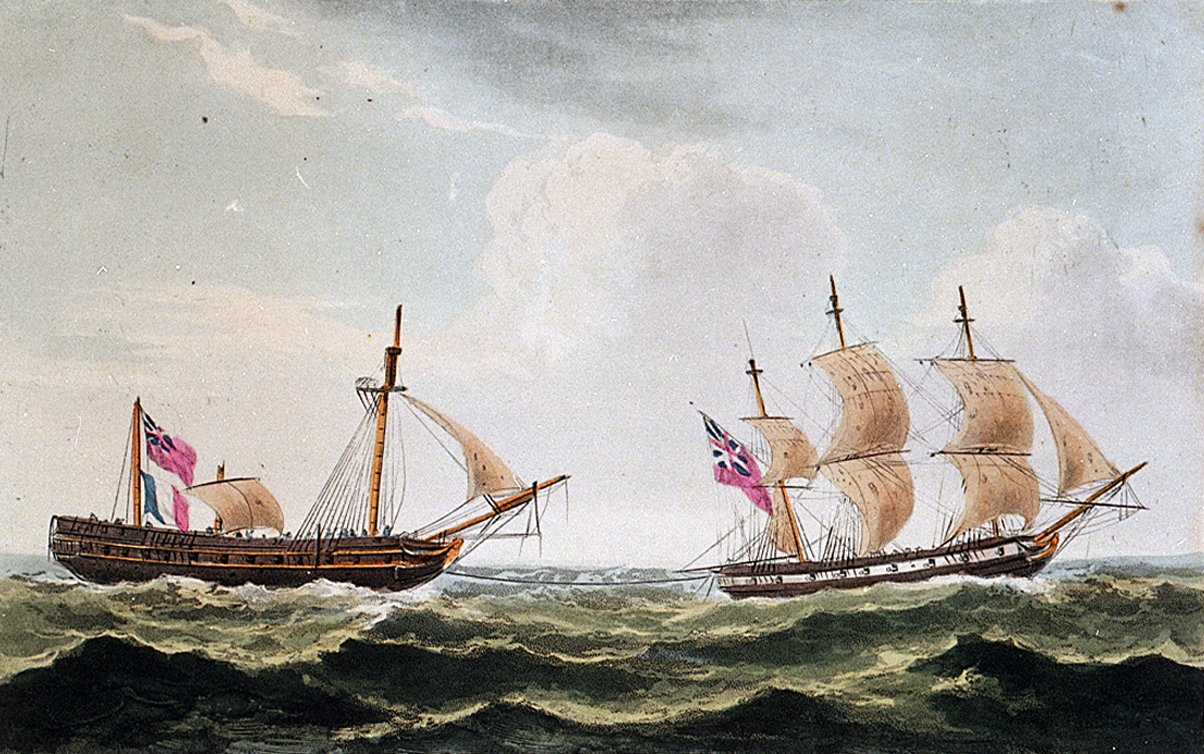
- Capture of La Furieuse Augt 6th 1809; Thomas Whitcombe
Date	14 June–6 July 1809
Location	Atlantic Ocean
Result	British victory

Belligerents
United Kingdom	France

Commanders and leaders
William Mounsey	Gabriel Kerdaniel

Strength
1 frigate 1 sloop-of-war	2 frigates

Casualties and losses
1 killed 5 wounded	35 killed 57 wounded 2 frigates captured

During May 1809, the frigates Félicité and Furieuse remained at Guadeloupe, taking on stores and preparing for their eventual return journey to France. Although they were both large frigates, they had been largely disarmed in France to create space for cargo: Furieuse was provided with only 20 cannon (including 12 carronades) and a crew of just 200, while Félicité had even fewer defences, carrying just 14 cannon and 174 men. Watching these ships was a small British blockade force led by Hugh Pigot in Latona with a few brigs and sloops, Cochrane's invasion fleet having been dispersed.

=== Félicité ===
On 14 June under the cover of darkness, the French frigates set sail, laden with colonial merchandise for sale in France. They were immediately spotted leaving Basse-Terre by the blockade squadron, but although the brig HMS Haughty managed to fire a few shots before they pulled away, only Latona and Cherub under Captain Thomas Tudor Tucker were able to maintain contact. Throughout 15, 16 and most of 17 June the chase continued, until the frigates separated: Furieuse led Cherub away from Latona and then outdistanced her, disappearing into the Atlantic. Félicité was unable to escape Latona however, and on 18 June was overrun. Outgunned by his larger opponent, Félicité's captain surrendered immediately. An old and worn ship, she was not deemed worthy of purchase into the Royal Navy and was instead sold to Haiti, reappearing in 1812 as the Haitian frigate Améthyste under the control of a privateer commissioned by Haitian rebels. Captain Yeo quickly attacked and captured her during the action of 3 February 1812.

=== Furieuse ===
Although Furieuse had escaped Cherub's pursuit, she still had to cross the Atlantic. Passing up the Eastern Seaboard of the United States, her commander, Lieutenant Gabriel-Etienne-Louis Le Marant Kerdaniel, raided British merchant shipping and was consequently delayed. At 15:00 on 5 July, the 20-gun sloop HMS Bonne Citoyenne under Captain William Mounsey, on passage from Halifax, Nova Scotia to Quebec, spotted Furieuse to the southwest taking possession of a British merchant ship. As Bonne Citoyenne approached, Kerdaniel abandoned the merchant ship and sailed northwards, Mounsey giving chase but trailing 5 nautical miles (9.3 km) behind throughout the day.

As darkness fell, Furieuse disappeared ahead, Mounsey pursuing in the hope of rediscovering his opponent during the night. At 03:00 on 6 July, the British lookouts spotted the French ship in the distance and the chase began again, Bonne Citoyenne proving much faster than the French ship as the wind strengthened. At 09:10 it became clear to Kerdaniel that he could not escape his opponent and instead turned to meet her, opening fire five minutes later as Bonne Citoyenne came within range. Mounsey replied immediately, the two ships exchanging fire at close range for nearly seven hours, the smaller and more manoeuvrable Bonne Citoyenne successfully turning several times to vary her broadsides and prevent her guns overheating. In the exchange, the British ship fired 129 broadsides, while Furieuse only managed 70: Bonne Citoyenne lost three cannon to fractures caused by the intense heat generated by repeated firing. With his ammunition spent, Mounsey swung towards Furieuse at 18:16 to board and capture her, at which point Kerdaniel, whose ship was battered and unmanoeuvrable, surrendered.

Due to her small size and high speed, Bonne Citoyenne suffered minimal casualties of one man killed and five wounded, although the ship itself was badly damaged. French losses were far more severe, with 35 killed, 37 seriously wounded including her captain, and 20 lightly wounded. Furieuse, built as a 40-gun frigate, had proven unable to match the speed and agility of the smaller ship and as a result her reduced armament had proven inadequate when faced with Mounsey's determined opposition. It was not until 01:30 on 7 July that temporary repairs were complete and the two ships began the long, slow journey to Halifax, Nova Scotia. The following day however, two of the Furieuse's masts collapsed and Mounsey was forced to take her in tow, both ships in constant danger of foundering. After 25 days in tow, Furieuse arrived in Halifax. Mounsey and his officers were widely praised for their success and Mounsey was given command of the repaired and newly purchased HMS Furieuse several months later as a reward. His first lieutenant was also promoted and the whole crew benefitted from the award of prize money. As with the April engagement, the capture of Furieuse was among the actions recognised by a clasp attached to the Naval General Service Medal.

== Subsequent operations ==
The failure of Troude's squadron to escape the British pursuit highlights the dominance of the Royal Navy in the Atlantic by 1809. With Martinique under British occupation and Cayenne and Santo Domingo falling in the same year, Guadeloupe was the only remaining French colony in the West Indies. Despite the supplies carried by Troude's ships, the situation there was desperate: food shortages and financial crisis causing a collapse in the island's morale. When a further effort to resupply the island was defeated in December 1809, the French losing two more frigates, the inhabitants had no alternative but to wait for the inevitable British invasion. In January 1810, Cochrane ordered an amphibious landing on Guadeloupe, which rapidly overwhelmed the weakened defenders and eliminated the last remaining French colony in the Caribbean Sea.
