= William Charles Fahie =

British Royal Navy officer

Vice-Admiral Sir William Charles Fahie KCB
- Born: 1763; Saint Kitts, Leeward Islands
- Died: 11 January 1833 (aged 69–70); Bermuda
- Military career
- Allegiance: United Kingdom
- Branch: Royal Navy
- Service years: 1777–1824
- Rank: Vice-Admiral
- Commands: HMS Woolwich; HMS Perdrix; HMS Hyaena; HMS Amelia; HMS Ethalion; HMS Belleisle; HMS Abercrombie; HMS Malta; Leeward Islands Station; North America Station
- Conflicts: American Revolutionary War; Battle of Cape St Vincent; Battle of Martinique; Battle of Saint Kitts; Battle of the Saintes; French Revolutionary Wars; Napoleonic Wars; Invasion of Martinique; Action of 14–17 April 1809; Invasion of Guadeloupe
- Awards: Knight Commander of the Order of the Bath

Vice-Admiral Sir William Charles Fahie KCB (1763 – 11 January 1833) was a prominent British Royal Navy officer during the American War of Independence, French Revolutionary War and the Napoleonic Wars. Unusually, Fahie's service was almost entirely spent in the West Indies, where he had been born and where he lived during the time he was in reserve and in his retirement. After extensive service in the Caribbean during the American War of Independence, during which Fahie impressed with his local knowledge, Fahie was in reserve between 1783 and 1793, returning to service to participate in Sir John Jervis' campaign against the French West Indian islands in 1794.

Remaining in the West Indies during the following 20 years of warfare, Fahie rose through the ranks to command the ship of the line HMS Belleisle in the invasion of Martinique and HMS Pompee in the subsequent action of Action of 14–17 April 1809, capturing the French ship D'Haupoult. In 1810 he participated in the invasion of Guadeloupe and transferred to European waters for the first time since 1780. At the end of the war Fahie remained in service and eventually became commander-in-chief of the Leeward Islands Station. He retired in 1824 and was subsequently knighted, settling in Bermuda with his second wife.

== Life ==
Fahie was born in Saint Kitts, one of the Leeward Islands, the son of a judge and part of a prominent family of Irish settlers. In 1777, aged 14, he was sent to serve in the Royal Navy during the American Revolutionary War, joining HMS Seaford under Captain John Colpoys. Within a year he had moved to HMS Royal George, later transferring again to Sir George Rodney's flagship HMS Sandwich. On Sandwich he was engaged in the Battle of Cape St Vincent off Southern Spain in 1780. Appointed lieutenant in the aftermath of the action, Fahie returned to the West Indies on HMS Russell, serving at the Battle of Martinique and the Battle of Saint Kitts. Due to his knowledge of the island, Fahie was selected to take messages to the besieged garrison on Saint Kitts but was briefly captured in the attempt, before being released. He later served at the Battle of the Saintes.

At the end of the war, Fahie remained in service but in reserve, remaining on Saint Kitts with his family. In 1793, at the outbreak of the French Revolutionary Wars, Fahie was given command of the sloop HMS Zebra, in which he participated in an attack on Fort-de-France, for which he was highly commended. He then served on Sir John Jervis' flagship HMS Boyne and then as captain of HMS Woolwich. In 1796 he became captain of HMS Perdrix. In her he engaged in one major action when on 12 December 1798 she took L'Armee d' Italie, a privateer of 18 guns. After a chase of 16 hours and an action of 42 minutes, the privateer was an unmanageable wreck. Of her crew of 117 men she had lost six dead and five wounded; Perdrix had only one man wounded, and some damage to her sails and rigging.

Fahie then served in European waters for some time, his first service out of the West Indies since 1780. In 1799 his ship was paid off, and Fahie remained in reserve until 1804, following the outbreak of the Napoleonic Wars.

Serving in command of HMS Hyaena in the West Indies, Fahie subsequently moved into HMS Amelia and then HMS Ethalion, participating in the seizure of the Danish West Indies in 1807 under Sir Alexander Cochrane. For this service he was promoted into the ship of the line HMS Belleisle and was prominently involved in the invasion of Martinique in January 1809. In the aftermath, Fahie exchanged ships with Commodore George Cockburn, taking over HMS Pompee. Pompee was subsequently heavily engaged at the action of 14–17 April 1809 with the French ship D'Hautpoul. Fahie successfully captured his opponent, but was badly wounded in the battle. By January 1810 he had sufficiently recovered to participate in the invasion of Guadeloupe in the captured D'Haupoult, renamed HMS Abercrombie.

In June 1810, Abercrombie escorted a convoy to Europe and was subsequently refitted in Britain, before join the squadron under Sir George Berkeley off Lisbon. For the next three years he operated in the Bay of Biscay and the English Channel in Abercrombie. Briefly in reserve following the peace of 1814, Fahie returned to service during the Hundred Days as commander of the naval forces off Italy in HMS Malta. For his services in that role he was made a Commander of the Order of St Ferdinand and Merit by the King of the Two Sicilies. In 1815 he was also made a Companion of the Order of the Bath. Returning to the West Indies in reserve, Fahie was subsequently promoted to rear-admiral in April 1819 and made commander of the Leeward Islands Station the following year. In 1821 he moved to Halifax, Nova Scotia as Commander-in-Chief, North America Station. When he left this command in 1824, he retired from the Navy completely, settling in Bermuda with his second wife. During his retirement he continued to advance in rank, become a Knight Commander of the Order of the Bath in October 1824 and a vice-admiral in 1830. He died on Bermuda in January 1833, having lived almost his entire life in the Caribbean.

== Notes ==
Military offices
Preceded by Thomas Huskisson	Commander-in-Chief, Leeward Islands Station; 1820–1821	Succeeded by Post disbanded
Preceded by Sir Edward Colpoys	Commander-in-Chief, North America and West Indies Station; 1821–1824	Succeeded by Sir Willoughby Lake
