= French ship Suffren (1803) =

Ship of the line of the French Navy

- Scale model of Achille, sister ship of French ship Suffren (1803), on display at the Musée national de la Marine in Paris.

History

France
- Name: Suffren
- Namesake: Admiral Pierre André de Suffren
- Builder: Lorient
- Laid down: 7 August 1801
- Launched: 17 September 1803
- Out of service: 1815
- Fate: Broken up in 1823

General characteristics
- Class & type: Téméraire-class ship of the line
- Displacement: 3,069 tonneaux
- Tons burthen: 1,537 port tonneaux
- Length: 55.44 m (181 ft 11 in)
- Beam: 14.45 m (47 ft 5 in)
- Draught: 7.15 m (23 ft 5 in)
- Depth of hold: 7.15 m (23 ft 5 in)
- Sail plan: Full-rigged ship
- Crew: 705
- Armament: 74 guns: Lower gun deck: 28 × 36 pdr guns; Upper gun deck: 30 × 18 pdr guns; Forecastle and Quarterdeck: 16 × 8 pdr guns

Suffren was a 74-gun, short Téméraire-class ship of the line built for the French Navy during the first decade of the 19th century. Completed in 1803, she played a minor role in the Napoleonic Wars, including Missiessy's expedition, the French invasion of Dominica, and the Trafalgar campaign. The ship was badly damaged in a collision in 1813 and was subsequently decommissioned. Suffren was condemned in 1815 and converted into a prison ship the following year before being scrapped in 1823.

== Description ==
The so-called short class of the Téméraires consisted two ships shortened by 65 centimetres (2 ft 2 in) while under construction to meet the requirements of the Minister of Marine, Pierre-Alexandre-Laurent Forfait. The ships had a length of 55.44 metres (181 ft 11 in), a beam of 14.45 metres (47 ft 5 in) and a depth of hold of 7.15 metres (23 ft 5 in). The ships displaced 3,069 tonneaux and had a mean draught of 7.15 metres (23 ft 5 in). They had a tonnage of 1,537 port tonneaux. Their crew numbered 705 officers and ratings during wartime. They were fitted with three masts and ship rigged.

The muzzle-loading, smoothbore armament of the Téméraire class consisted of twenty-eight 36-pounder long guns on the lower gun deck and thirty 18-pounder long guns on the upper gun deck. On the forecastle and quarterdeck were a total of sixteen 8-pounder long guns. Beginning with the ships completed after 1787, the armament of the Téméraires began to change with the addition of four 36-pounder obusiers on the poop deck (dunette). Some ships had instead twenty 8-pounders. By 1807 the obusiers had been abolished and the ships had a mix of 8-pounders and 36-pounder carronades, up to a total of 28 guns.

== Construction and career ==
Suffren was laid down in August 1801 at the Arsenal de Lorient and named on 14 November. The ship was launched on 23 September 1803, commissioned on 10 December at the Arsenal de Rochefort and completed later that month. Suffren, her half-sister Jemmapes, and the frigates Armide and Gloire attempted to break out from Rochefort on 2 August 1804, but they were spotted by the blockaders and returned to their anchorage. All four ships were assigned to Rear Admiral Édouard de Missiessy's Rochefort squadron in January 1805.

Missiessy's squadron was able to leave their anchorage on 11 January 1805, but was not able to proceed into the Atlantic until 25 January because of unfavorable winds and storms. They chased a British convoy in the Saint Lucia Channel on 20 February, but only captured a single ship. The squadron arrived in Fort-de-France, Martinique, that afternoon. After conferring with Vice Admiral Louis Villaret de Joyeuse, governor-general of the colony and Général de division Joseph Lagrange, commander of the 3,500 troops aboard his ship, Missiessy decided to attack Dominica as soon as possible. The plan was to land troops in three places, one on each side of the colony's capital, Roseau, and another near a mountain on the northwestern coast of the island.

Missiessy's main force appeared off Roseau at dawn on 22 February showing British colors which deceived Major-General George Prevost, the colony's governor, who sent a representative to show the ships where to anchor. The French ships were able to begin disembarking their troops before they changed to their true colors and easily reached the shore before the British garrison could respond. Suffren, her half-sister Magnanime and three frigates initially duelled with Forts Young and Melville that defended Roseau, but were soon joined by the rest of the squadron. Lagrange's troops soon forced Prevost and the mobile elements of his garrison to withdraw into the island's interior, but Fort Young was not taken until 4 PM. Prevost rejected Lagrange's demand for his surrender on 25 February and the latter decided to withdraw, against his orders and despite the availability of reinforcements from Guadeloupe. The French had captured 22 merchantmen in the harbor and they forced the inhabitants to pay a ransom of £5,500. After selling his prizes and unloading supplies at Guadalupe, Missiessy departed on 2 March to begin the raids dictated by his orders; he was able to extort £18,000 from Saint Kitts and £4000 from Nevis. He arrived back at Fort-de-France where he found dispatches ordering him to return home forthwith. Missiessy stopped enroute at besieged Santo Domingo where he unloaded his remaining troops and supplies. The squadron arrived back at Rochefort on 20 May.

Suffren participated in Allemand's expedition in July–December 1805 under Captain Amable Troude. She was refitted in 1806 at the Arsenal de Rochefort and recommissioned the following year. The ship was badly damaged in a collision with her half-sister Trident in 1813 and was decommissioned on 22 February 1814. Suffren became a careening ship (vaisseau fosse) later that year. She was condemned on 19 December 1815 and ordered to be hulked as a prison ship in Toulon harbour in mid-1816. The ship was broken up in 1823.

== Bibliography ==
- James, William (1902) [1837]. The Naval History of Great Britain from the Declaration of War by France in 1799 to the Accession of George IV. Vol. IV: 1805–1809 (New six volume ed.). Macmillan.
- Roche, Jean-Michel (2005). Dictionnaire des bâtiments de la flotte de guerre française de Colbert à nos jours [Dictionary of French Warships from Colbert to Today]. Vol. 1: 1671-1870. Roche. ISBN 978-2-9525917-0-6. OCLC 165892922.
- Winfield, Rif & Roberts, Stephen S. (2015) French Warships in the Age of Sail 1786-1861: Design, Construction, Careers and Fates. Seaforth Publishing. ISBN 978-1-84832-204-2
