= French corvette Perdrix (1784) =

Corvette of the Royal French Navy

History

France
- Name: Perdrix
- Namesake: Partridge
- Builder: Hubert Pennevert, Rochefort, to plans by Charles-Étienne Bombelle
- Laid down: 1783
- Launched: 18 June 1784
- Captured: June 1796

Great Britain
- Name: HMS Perdrix
- Acquired: June 1795 by capture
- Fate: Broken up September 1799

General characteristics
- Class & type: Fauvette-class corvette
- Displacement: 752 tons (French)
- Tons burthen: 51631/94 (bm)
- Length: 118 ft 5 1/2 in (36.1 m) (overall); 98 ft 7 3/8 in (30.1 m) (keel)
- Beam: 31 ft 4 1/2 in (9.6 m)
- Draught: 12 ft 0 in (3.7 m) (unladen);12 ft 6 in (3.8 m) (laden)
- Depth of hold: 9 ft 0 in (2.7 m)
- Propulsion: Sails
- Complement: French service:160; British service:155
- Armament: French service: 20 × 6-pounder guns + 2 × 36-pounder obusiers; British service: 24 guns

Perdrix was a corvette of the French Royal Navy, launched in 1784. The British captured her off Antigua in 1795 and she served briefly in the Royal Navy in the West Indies, where she captured a French privateer, before being broken up in 1798.

== French service and capture ==
In April 1786 Perdrix was holed by a rock when she arrived at Tobago. She was refloated and repaired there between April and July.

Between 14 February and 2 May 1791, Perdrix was under the command of Lieutenant de vaisseaux Duval-Paris. He sailed her from Brest to Cadiz, and then on to Martinique and Cap-Français, carrying payroll. In December 1792 she sailed to the assistance of the frigate Didon, which had foundered before Pointe-à-Pitre. From there Perdrix returned to Fort-Royal. She then sailed back to France, sailing from Rochefort to Brest, via La Corogne. On 4 December 1792 sous-lieutenant de vaisseaux Krohm took command, with Duval-Paris being promoted to capitaine de vaisseau the next day.

Perdrix cruised to the south of Belle Île, then was at Rochefort, before cruising along the coasts of la Vendée. Next she sailed from Rochefort to Mindin (Opposite to Saint-Nazaire). Lastly, she sailed on a mission to Saint-Pierre-et-Miquelon. During this period she had several commanders. From 26 February to 24 April 1793 her commander was capitaine de vaisseau Renaudin. His successor was enseigne de vaisseau non entretenu Garreau (temporarily until 20 May 1793), and nominally between 26 February and 22 July, lieutenant de vaisseau Barré, though Barré may not have assumed command until 14 May.

Barré, who continued in command until 28 November 1794, sailed Perdrix from Paimbœuf to Nova Scotia and then to New York. He was on the United States station, where he convoyed vessels from Sandy Hook to Cape Henlopen and into the Atlantic. In June 1794, Perdrix was perhaps temporarily under the command of Lieutenant de vaiseaux Le Bouteiller.

Rear-Admiral Thompson, in Vanguard, returned to Martinique on 13 June 1795, after seeing a convoy in safety to 24 Deg. 8 Min North. On his way back, on 5 June he captured Perdrix, a "French Ship of War of 24 Guns." She was under the command of Lieutenant de vaisseau Le Bouteiller.

== British service ==
The British commissioned Perdrix on 2 February 1796 under the command of Captain William Charles Fahie. At some point between 18 March 1797 and 30 May, Perdrix recaptured the sloop General, H. Bloombury, Master, from Barbados. She had been sailing to Martinique with a cargo of dry goods and provisions. Perdrix recaptured her off Guadaloupe and sent her to Fort Royal, Martinique.

On 13 January 1798, while Fahie was on leave to take temporary command of the fleet, then anchored before St. Kitts, Lieutenant Charles Peterson was in command of Perdrix. She and Favourite, which was under the command of Thomas Pitt, Lieutenant Lord Camelford, were both in English Harbour, Antigua undergoing refit. A dispute arose between the two lieutenants over who was senior and so in charge of the port and both vessels. In the dispute, Camelford shot and killed Peterson for mutiny. What triggered the dispute was the departure from the harbour on the previous day of HMS Babet, whose captain, Jemmet Mainwaring, had previously been the senior officer in the port. Peterson had been first lieutenant under Camelford for three months when Camelford had taken over Favourite, even though Peterson was senior on the lieutenants list and represented Captain Fahie. The two ships' companies almost fired on each other when Camelford shot Petersen. Captain Henry Mitford of Matilda arrived that evening and put Camelford under arrest. Mitford put Lieutenant Parsons of Favourite in command of Perdrix and sent her out to sea. The subsequent court martial acquitted Camelford. (Note: Pitt was a cousin of the then Prime Minister, William Pitt. Also, with the Spithead and Nore mutinies of 1797 fresh in everyone's mind, the Navy may have been sensitive on the issue of mutiny. When Camelford died in a duel in 1804, apparently few people regretted his demise.)

Perdrix engaged in one major action when on 12 December 1798 she took L'Armée d' Italie, a privateer of fourteen 9-pounder and four 12-pounder guns. A few days earlier Perdrix had encountered an American vessel leeward of St Thomas, which had reported being boarded by a French privateer seven leagues east of Virgin Gorda. The wind and weather were such that it took four days before Fahie could get Perdrix to the area and find his quarry.

After a chase of 16 hours and an action of 42 minutes, the privateer was an unmanageable wreck. Of her crew of 117 men under the command of Citizen Colachyshe had lost six dead and five wounded; Perdrix had only one man wounded, and some damage to her sails and rigging. L'Armee d' Italie was 11 days out of Guadeloupe and had captured the brig Bittern and the schooner Concorde, out of Martinique. (Some members of their crews were aboard L'Armee d' Italie when Perdrix captured her. Perdrix then took her into Tortola, where she was condemned a week later.

At some point Perdrix captured Remt Folkerus.

== Fate ==
Perdrix arrived at Deptford on 22 July 1799. She was broken up on 10 September, less than two months after arriving.
