= French ship D'Hautpoul =

Ship of the line of the French Navy

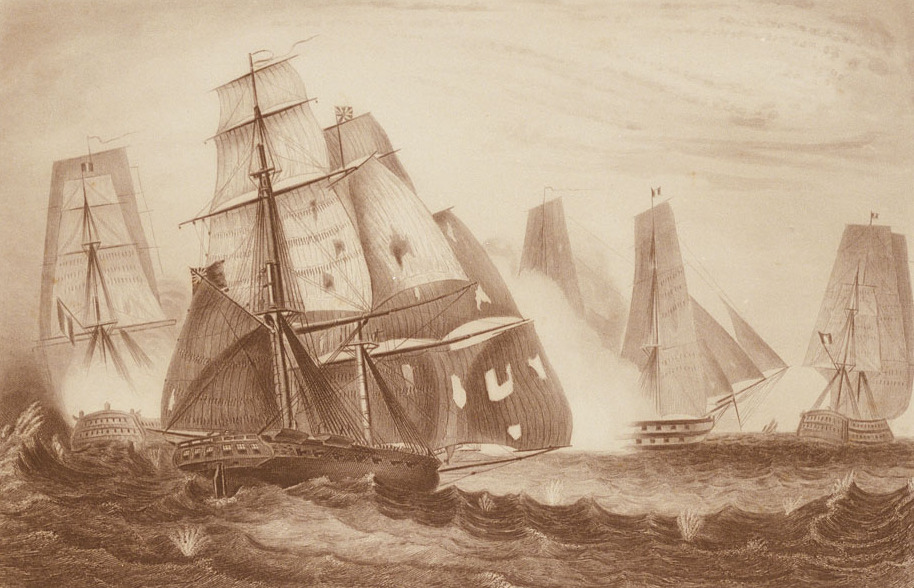
- D'Hautpoul (second from right) on 15 April 1809

History

France
- Name: D'Hautpoul
- Namesake: General Jean-Joseph Ange d'Hautpoul
- Builder: Frères Crucy at Lorient shipyard
- Laid down: June 1803
- Launched: 2 September 1807
- Completed: February 1808
- Captured: 17 April 1809

United Kingdom
- Name: Abercrombie
- Acquired: April 1809
- Honours and awards: Naval General Service Medal with clasp "Guadaloupe"
- Fate: Sold 1817

General characteristics
- Class & type: Téméraire-class ship of the line
- Displacement: 3,069 tonneaux
- Tons burthen: 1,537 port tonneaux
- Length: 55.87 metres (183.3 ft) (172 pied)
- Beam: 14.90 metres (48 ft 11 in)
- Draught: 7.26 metres (23.8 ft) (22 pied)
- Propulsion: Up to 2,485 m^{2} (26,750 sq ft) of sails
- Complement: 680 (French service)
- Armament: 74 guns: Lower gundeck: 28 × 36-pounder long guns; Upper gundeck: 30 × 18-pounder long guns; Fc and QD::16 × 8-pounder long guns + 4 × 36-pounder carronades

D'Hautpoul was a 74-gun Téméraire-class ship of the line built for the French Navy during the first decade of the 19th century. The ship was launched at Lorient on 2 September 1807. She was previously named Alcide and Courageux.

== French service ==
On 16 February 1809 Captain Amand Leduc, Chevalier of the Légion d'honneur, commanded D'Hautpoul on her maiden voyage, a mission to Martinique with reinforcements and supplies, as the flagship of a squadron of three 74-gun ships. (The other vessels were Courageux and Polonais), and two frigates, under the overall command of Commodore Amable Troude.) Learning of the capture of Martinique, Troude's squadron turned back but was pursued by the British.

D'Hautpoul was captured by her now-British sister ship HMS Pompée, on 17 April 1809 off Puerto Rico after a chase over three nights and two days by Pompée, HMS Recruit, and HMS Neptune. Recruit hung on the tail of the French squadron and managed to cripple D'Hautpoul's mizzen mast, so Pompée could bring her to action and capture her after exchanging fire for 75 minutes. Between 80 and 90 men from D'Hautpoul were killed or wounded, including several officers.

== British service ==
Taken as a prize, she was renamed Abercrombie, and was briefly given to the commander of Recruit, Charles Napier, who was made post captain for his part in the action, as acting captain. Captain William Fahie of Pompée, who had fallen ill after capturing her, then replaced Napier.

Abercrombie participated in the capture of Guadeloupe in January and February 1810. (Note: A first-class share of the prize money for Guadaloupe was worth £113 3s 1¼d; a sixth-class share, that of an ordinary seaman, was worth £1 9s 1¼d.) In 1847 the Admiralty awarded the Naval General Service Medal with clasp "Guadaloupe" to all surviving participants of the campaign.

In February 1810 Captain Fahie was appointed a commodore to assist with landings. His squadron comprised Abercrombie, Vimiera, Snap, Morne Fortunee, Frolic, Surinam, Superieure, and Ringdove. The squadron arrived off St Martin's on 14 February, and the combined might of the ships and a company of the 25th Regiment of Foot forced the French and Dutch occupants to surrender by 16 February. On 21 February Abercrombie sailed to Saint Eustatius with Ringdove; the island also quickly capitulated.

After being repaired at Plymouth at the cost of £16,375, Abercrombie sailed for Portugal on 30 December 1810 as part of Admiral George Berkeley's squadron off Lisbon. On 5 September 1811 she took the French brigs Les Deux Amis and Le Jean Baptiste, and the sloop La Marie French while in company with Pompée, HMS Dryad, and HMS Arrow. While she was at anchor in the Basque Roads on 26 October 1811, lightning damaged her fore topmast and foremast.

Between 1812 and 1813 Abercrombie served in the English Channel. On 14 January 1813 Abercrombie, still under the command of Captain Fahie, recaptured the British trader Industry. On 17 July 1813 she shared the proceeds of the capture of Union with HMS Dublin, and on 17 December captured Marie Antoinette. (Note: A first-class share of the prize money was worth £7 19s 2¾d; a sixth-class share was worth 11½d.)

== Fate ==
By May 1814 Abercrombie was lying decommissioned in the Hamoaze. She was sold for £3,810 at Plymouth on 30 April 1817.

== See also ==
- List of ships of the line of France
