= Amand Leduc =

French Navy officer

Amand Leduc (French pronunciation: [amɑ̃ lədyk]; Dunkirk, 11 August 1764 — Dunkirk, 18 March 1832) was a French sailor and Navy officer of the First French Empire.

== Career ==
Born to a family of merchants, Leduc started sailing in the merchant navy on 4 April 1774 as a boy, on the fishing ship Thérèse, of Nieuport. He served on a number of ships before enlisting on the privateer Maraudeur on 18 August 1778. Maraudeur took nine prizes, and Leduc was wounded at the hand during one of the battles. On 23 February 1779, he enlisted on the privateer Calonne, in Dunkirk; on 2 May 1779, Calonne was captured by a British cutter, after a nine-hour fight; Leduc was wounded at the leg, head and forehead.

Freed, Leduc served again on a privateer, the Duc de Fissac, before returning to the merchant navy. He served as an officer on various ships, before earning his commission of sea captain on 17 June 1790. He joined the Navy on 8 June 1793 as an enseigne de vaisseau entretenu and took command of the aviso Entreprise during the Siege of Dunkirk. He distinguished himself at the siege of Collioure.

=== Service on Junon and Incorruptible ===
Promoted to Lieutenant on 26 July 1794, he served on the 80-gun Ça Ira. After August 1794, he took command of the 18-gun Hazard, on which he took part in the Battle of Genoa. On 28 June, he transferred on the Junon, on which he took part in the Battle of the Hyères Islands.

Promoted to Commander on 21 March 1796, he relinquished his command in Venice on 6 October 1797 because of sickness. On 25 March 1800, he was appointed to command the frigate Incorruptible and took part in the Raid on Dunkirk, where on was again wounded. After re-arming Incorruptible, he led a campaign in the Caribbean, but had to relinquish command for sickness again on 2 February 1803.

Returned to France, Leduc was appointed to command a squadron in the Flottille de Boulogne. From 26 March 1804, he served as first adjutant of the Navy in Boulogne Harbour.

=== Leduc's expedition in the Arctic ===
In 1806, Leduc was appointed to command a frigate division and sail to the Arctic to prey on British whalers. His division comprised the frigates Sirène, on which he had his flag; Guerrière, under Commander Hubert; Revanche, under Commander Lambert and the brig Néarque, under Lieutenant Jourdain.

The division departed Lorient on 28 March 1806. Upon departure, it became evident that Néarque was a far worse sailer than the frigates and that she could not follow; Leduc detached her so that she would carry out her orders independently, but she was captured almost immediately by HMS Niobe.

The winter of 1806 being particularly long harsh, Leduc found his route blocked by ice; he decided to wait off the Azores, where on 20 April the division captured the British Ruth; she was given a prize crew under Midshipman Besse and sailed to Ponta Delgada, but ran aground on the coast of São Miguel Island on 5 June and was lost.

On 21 May, Leduc had sailed into the North Sea. The division sailed to the Western coast of Iceland and attempted to reach the Spitsbergen, but icebergs and foul weather prevented it from going further than the 70th parallel. the coast of Greenland and back to Iceland.

On 12 June, a gale split Guerrière from her consorts; Leduc shearched in vain for Guerrière for several days, and failing to find at Trondheim, sailed to the Faroe Islands. In July, the British Admiralty was informed of Leduc's mission, and detached the frigates HMS Blanche, Phoebe and Thames to seek him.

On 18, Blanche spotted Guerrière and gave chase. Guerrière had already suffered 36 fatalities to scurvy, and had 80 more sick aboard; Captain Hubert thus decided to refuse the engagement and attempted to elude Blanche, but she caught on the next day and Guerrière struck her colours.

Leduc's division returned to Île-de-Bréhat in September 1806, Saint-Malo being blockaded; it had destroyed or captured 38 British merchantmen and whalers, and one Russian whaler.

=== Service on Ville de Berlin, D'Hautpoul and Golymin ===
On 27 October 1806, Ledeux was promoted to captain. In early 1807, Leduc was appointed to command the 74-gun Ville de Berlin, which he sailed from Anvers to Flessingen.

In late 1807, he took command of the 74-gun D'Hautpoul. In 1809, D'Hautpoul took part in Troude's expedition to the Caribbean to ferry troops, food supplies and ammunitions from Lorient to the Saintes. She was captured off Portro Rico by the 74-gun HMS Pompée and the frigates Latona and Castor on 17 April. Leduc was lightly wounded, taken prisoner and released on parole. He returned to La Rochelle on an American ship on 29 September 1809, and was acquitted for the loss of his ship during the automatic court-martial.

Exchanged in November 1810, Leduc was appointed to command the 80-gun Tilsitt, before transferring on the 74-gun Golymin on 6 March 1811, part of the squadron of Lorient under Vice-Admiral Allemand. Golymin was wrecked at Brest on 23 March 1814. The crew was saved without loss of life. The automatic court-martial found him innocent of the loss of his ship.

Leduc was then employed ashore until he retired on 1 January 1816.

== Notes and references ==
=== Bibliography ===
- Guérin, Léon (1857). Histoire maritime de France (in French). Vol. 6. Dufour et Mulat.
- Levot, Prosper (1866). Les gloires maritimes de la France: notices biographiques sur les plus célèbres marins (in French). Bertrand.
- Mac Carthy, Jacques W. (1823). Choix de voyages dans les quatre parties du Monde (in French). Librairie nationale et étrangère.
- Quintin, Danielle; Quintin, Bernard (2003). Dictionnaire des capitaines de Vaisseau de Napoléon (in French). S.P.M. ISBN 2-901952-42-9.
- Roche, Jean-Michel (2005). Dictionnaire des bâtiments de la flotte de guerre française de Colbert à nos jours. Vol. 1. Group Retozel-Maury Millau. ISBN 978-2-9525917-0-6. OCLC 165892922.
- Troude, Onésime-Joachim (1867). Batailles navales de la France (in French). Vol. 3. Challamel ainé.
- Troude, Onésime-Joachim (1867). Batailles navales de la France (in French). Vol. 4. Challamel ainé.
- Fonds Marine. Campagnes (opérations; divisions et stations navales; missions diverses). Inventaire de la sous-série Marine BB4. Tome premier : BB4 1 à 482 (1790-1826)
