= HMS Recruit (1806) =

Brig-sloop of the Royal Navy

- Recruit

History

United Kingdom
- Name: HMS Recruit
- Ordered: 27 January 1806
- Builder: Andrew Hills, Sandwich, Kent
- Laid down: April 1806
- Launched: 31 August 1806
- Honours and awards: Naval General Service Medal with clasp "Martinique"
- Fate: Sold for breaking up 7 August 1822

General characteristics
- Class & type: 18-gun Cruizer-class brig-sloop
- Tons burthen: 38291/94 (bm)
- Length: 100 ft (30 m) (overall); 77 ft 3 1/2 in (23.559 m) (keel)
- Beam: 30 ft 6 in (9.30 m)
- Depth of hold: 12 ft 9 in (3.89 m)
- Propulsion: Sails
- Sail plan: Brig-sloop
- Complement: 121
- Armament: 16 × 32-pounder carronades; 2 × 6-pounder bow chasers

HMS Recruit was an 18-gun Cruizer-class brig-sloop of the Royal Navy, launched in 1806 at Sandwich, Kent. She is best known for an act of pique by Commander Warwick Lake, who marooned a seaman, and for an inconclusive but hard-fought ship action under Commander Charles John Napier against the French corvette Diligente. She captured a number of American vessels as prizes during the War of 1812 before being laid up in 1815 and sold for breaking up in 1822.

== Napoleonic Wars ==
Recruit was ordered on 27 January 1806 from the shipwright Andrew Hills, of Sandwich, Kent. She was laid down in April 1806 and launched on 31 August 1806.

=== The marooning of Seaman Jeffery ===
Recruit was commissioned under Commander George Ackholm in March 1807. On 28 August, Tromp detained the Danish ships Diamond and Karen Louisa. Recruit, Humber, Cheerful, and Experiment were in sight and shared in the proceeds of the seizure.

Next, Recruit sailed to the Caribbean under Commander Warwick Lake, supposedly in July, but clearly later. During the voyage, a young sailor named Robert Jeffery was discovered to have stolen the midshipmen's beer and Lake furiously ordered him to be marooned on the island of Sombrero. (Jeffery had been born at Fowey but moved to Polperro before becoming a merchant seaman and was then pressed into the navy.) Some months later, Lake's commanding officer Sir Alexander Cochrane discovered what had happened and immediately ordered Lake to retrieve Jeffery. When Recruit arrived at Sombrero, Jeffery could not be found. Eventually the story got out and a court martial dismissed Lake from the service for his actions. As it turned out, Jeffery had been picked up by an American ship and was eventually discovered in Massachusetts three years later, working as a blacksmith. He returned to Britain aboard HMS Thistle and received compensation. (Note: To gather evidence for the court martial, the Admiralty had sent Freya and Recruit's sister ship, Frolic, to ascertain the survival prospects for someone landed at the island without food and water. The two ships reported back that the prospects for survival were poor.)

=== Captain Charles Napier ===
Command passed to Commander Charles Napier, who led Recruit into action against the French corvette Diligente, under Jean-François Lemaresquier, on 6 September 1808. The action was fierce and resulted in Recruit losing her mainmast and suffering heavy casualties, including Napier, whose leg was broken by a cannon shot. Diligente was only driven off after a lucky shot from Recruit ignited an ammunition store. Recruit lost six killed and 23 wounded, half of them mortally, out of a crew of 106.

Following repairs, Recruit participated in the invasion of Martinique in January 1809. Napier observed that Fort Edward at Fort Royal Bay appeared abandoned. He took a gig and with four men, landed, scaled the fort's walls, and hoisted a British flag. Sir Alexander Cochrane immediately landed marines to occupy the fort and turn its mortars, which had not been spiked, against the French. In 1847 the Admiralty authorized the issuance of the Naval General Service Medal with clasp "Martinique" to all survivors of the campaign. Shortly thereafter, Napier received promotion to Post-captain and appointment to command of Jason, but remained with Recruit for a few more months.

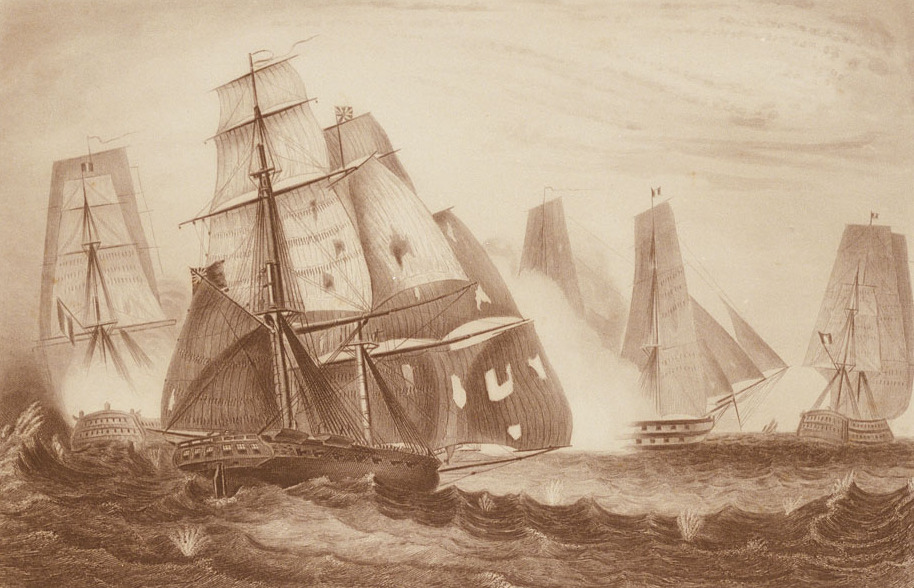
Recruit attacking the D'Haupoult; the 74 now pouring a broadside into her, 15 April 1809.

In April 1809, a strong French squadron arrived at the Îles des Saintes, south of Guadeloupe. There they were blockaded until 14 April, when a British force under Major-General Frederick Maitland and Captain Philip Beaver in Acasta, invaded and captured the islands. Recruit was among the naval vessels that shared in the proceeds of the capture of the islands. (Note: The prize agent for a number of the vessels involved, Henry Abbott, went bankrupt. In May 1835 there was a final payment of a dividend from his estate. A first-class share was worth 10s 2 3/4d; a sixth-class share, that of an ordinary seaman, was worth 1d. Seventh-class (landsmen) and eighth-class (boys) shares were fractions of a penny, too small to pay.)

In April 1809, Recruit participated in the defeat of a French reinforcement squadron. During the engagement, Napier was instrumental in maintaining contact with the French force, harrying their flagship D'Hautpoul continuously at some great risk to Recruit that only Napier's skillful ship handling mitigated. Recruit was present at the surrender of D'Hautpoul and Napier was temporarily appointed to command the captured ship of the line, but then transferred to Jason and sailed her back to Britain. However, on his arrival the Admiralty confirmed his rank but not his appointment, and he was put on half-pay. Jason's new captain was Captain King, who had been Napier's passenger on Jason. Napier protested to the Admiralty that had he not stayed on Recruit and contributed to the capture of D'Hautpoul he would have received a command, but to no avail.

In June 1809 command of Recruit transferred to Commander James Murray, and then in May 1810 Commander John Cookesley replaced Murray.

== War of 1812 ==
In December 1810 Commander Humphrey Fleming Senhouse took command and later sailed Recruit back to Britain.

In 1811, Recruit was at Spithead. She sailed for North America on 9 November 1811. On 21 November she recaptured Ranger, Mottley, master. The French privateer schooner Juno, from Saint-Malo, of 16 guns and 105 men, had that day captured Ranger as she was coming from the Brazils. Ranger arrived at Plymouth on 1 December. (Note: Junon had been possibly commissioned in November 1809. She was wrecked at "La Cité" before November 1810. The British took some of her crew prisoner. Lloyd's List simply reported that the privateer Juno had been lost on 10 November near Saint-Malo.)

Recruit was at Halifax, Nova Scotia at the outbreak of the War of 1812. When Rattler captured Romney on 22 September 1812, and Santa Maria on 28 September, Recruit shared the prize money by agreement. (Note: A first-class share of the prize money was worth £221 13s 11 1/2d; a sixth-class share was worth £4 15s 9d.)

In 1813, Recruit was trapped in ice off Cape Breton where over half her complement were taken ill with sicknesses related to a lack of fresh vegetables. When Lieutenant George Pechell (acting commander) took command of Recruit for his first cruise that summer, she had only half her normal crew.

On 18 July Recruit re-captured the ship Lavinia, T. Connell, master. Lavinia had been sailing from Saint Johns, Newfoundland, to Oporto when the privateer Yorktown had captured her. Then on 20 August Recruit recaptured the brig King George, J.Thompson, master. When she was captured, King George, a brig of 204 tons (bm), had been carrying salt from Liverpool.

On 2 November, Recruit and Doterel drove the letter of marque schooner Inca on the shoals at Cape Romain. Inca was armed with six 12-pounder carronades and carried a crew of 35 men. (Note: Inca, of 239 tons (bm), was under the command of Captain Alexander Thompson. She had been launched at Baltimore in 1807 and been commissioned there as a privateer on 13 August 1812 and again on 2 October 1813. She was totally lost.)

On 4 January 1814 Recruit captured the merchantman Mary Ann. Then on 4 June recruit captured the brig Betsy, R.Bears, master. Betsy was carrying 100 barrels of flour.

Commander Thomas Sykes assumed command in February, from Indian. On 10 August Recruit captured the American merchantman Federalist.

Sykes' successor in 1815 was Commander John Lawrence.

== Fate ==
On 13 June 1815, Recruit was paid off into ordinary at Plymouth. She was sold to R. Forbes on 7 August 1822 for £1,050.
