= French ship Polonais (1808) =

French gun-ship

- Scale model of Achille, sister ship of French ship Polonais (1808), on display at the Musée national de la Marine in Paris.

History

France
- Name: Polonais
- Namesake: Poland; Fleur-de-lis
- Ordered: 25 February 1804
- Builder: Lorient
- Laid down: 4 July 1804
- Launched: 27 May 1808
- Commissioned: 25 July 1808
- Renamed: Lys, 1814
- Stricken: 1822
- Fate: Broken up, 1825

General characteristics
- Class & type: Téméraire-class ship of the line
- Displacement: 3,069 tonneaux
- Tons burthen: 1,537 port tonneaux
- Length: 55.87 m (183 ft 4 in)
- Beam: 14.46 m (47 ft 5 in)
- Draught: 7.15 m (23.5 ft)
- Depth of hold: 7.15 m (23 ft 5 in)
- Sail plan: Full-rigged ship
- Crew: 705
- Armament: 74 guns: Lower gun deck: 28 × 36 pdr guns; Upper gun deck: 30 × 18 pdr guns; Forecastle and Quarterdeck: 16 × 8 pdr guns

Polonais was a 74-gun Téméraire-class ship of the line built for the French Navy during the 1790s. Completed in 1805, she played a minor role in the Napoleonic Wars.

== Description ==
Designed by Jacques-Noël Sané, the Téméraire-class ships had a length of 55.87 metres (183 ft 4 in), a beam of 14.46 metres (47 ft 5 in) and a depth of hold of 7.15 metres (23 ft 5 in). The ships displaced 3,069 tonneaux and had a mean draught of 7.15 metres (23 ft 5 in). They had a tonnage of 1,537 port tonneaux. Their crew numbered 705 officers and ratings during wartime. They were fitted with three masts and ship rigged.

The muzzle-loading, smoothbore armament of the Téméraire class consisted of twenty-eight 36-pounder long guns on the lower gun deck and thirty 18-pounder long guns on the upper gun deck. On the quarterdeck and forecastle were a total of sixteen 8-pounder long guns. Beginning with the ships completed after 1787, the armament of the Téméraires began to change with the addition of four 36-pounder obusiers on the poop deck (dunette). Some ships had instead twenty 8-pounders.

== Construction and career ==
Polonais was ordered on 11 November 1804 and laid down in February 1805 at the Arsenal de Lorient. The ship was named Glorieux on 26 February 1805 and reordered on 26 March. She was renamed Polonais on 23 February 1807, launched on 27 May 1808 and commissioned on 25 June by Captain Mequet. The ship departed Lorient with Troude's squadron, which included her sister ships D'Hautpoul and Courageux, on 26 February 1809, bound for the Caribbean with troops and supplies. On 29 May, Polonais and Courageux reached Cherbourg along with seven prize ships captured on the return voyage. D'Hautpoul had been captured in the action of 14–17 April 1809.

In April 1814, at the Bourbon Restoration, Polonais was renamed Lys. She then ferried Louis XVIII back to France. She was briefly renamed Polonais during the Hundred Days of Napoleon, and then back to Lys again. After the Bourbon Restoration, Lys was sent to retake possession of the island of Martinique, along with the frigate Érigone and the corvette Vésuve. The squadron arrived at Fort Royal on 5 October 1814. From 1822, she was used as a storage hulk, and she was broken up in Brest in 1825–1826.
