= French ship Courageux (1806) =

Ship of the line of the French Navy

- Scale model of Achille, sister ship of French ship Courageux (1806), on display at the Musée national de la Marine in Paris.

History

France
- Name: Courageux
- Namesake: Courageous
- Builder: Lorient
- Laid down: 2 November 1801
- Launched: 3 February 1806
- In service: 8 April 1806
- Out of service: 16 March 1831
- Fate: Broken up 1831

General characteristics
- Class & type: Téméraire-class ship of the line
- Displacement: 3,069 tonneaux
- Tons burthen: 1,537 port tonneaux
- Length: 55.87 m (183 ft 4 in)
- Beam: 14.46 m (47 ft 5 in)
- Draught: 7.15 m (23.5 ft)
- Depth of hold: 7.15 m (23 ft 5 in)
- Sail plan: Full-rigged ship
- Crew: 705
- Armament: 74 guns: Lower gun deck: 28 × 36 pdr guns; Upper gun deck: 30 × 18 pdr guns; Forecastle and Quarterdeck: 16 × 8 pdr guns

Courageux was a 4th rank, 74-gun Téméraire-class ship of the line built for the French Navy during the 1790s. Completed in 1806, she played a minor role in the Napoleonic Wars.

== Description ==
Designed by Jacques-Noël Sané, the Téméraire-class ships had a length of 55.87 metres (183 ft 4 in), a beam of 14.46 metres (47 ft 5 in) and a depth of hold of 7.15 metres (23 ft 5 in). The ships displaced 3,069 tonneaux and had a mean draught of 7.15 metres (23 ft 5 in). They had a tonnage of 1,537 port tonneaux. Their crew numbered 705 officers and ratings during wartime. They were fitted with three masts and ship rigged.

The muzzle-loading, smoothbore armament of the Téméraire class consisted of twenty-eight 36-pounder long guns on the lower gun deck and thirty 18-pounder long guns on the upper gun deck. On the quarterdeck and forecastle were a total of sixteen 8-pounder long guns. Beginning with the ships completed after 1787, the armament of the Téméraires began to change with the addition of four 36-pounder obusiers on the poop deck (dunette). Some ships had instead twenty 8-pounders.

== Construction and career ==
Courageux was ordered on 15 May 1801 and named Alcide on 7 January 1802. The ship was renamed Courageux on 22 January, laid down in July at the Arsenal de Lorient and launched on 3 February 1806. The ship was commissioned on 8 April 1806 and completed later that month. Captain Amable Troude was in command of Courageux which was serving as his flagship of a squadron also comprising Polonais and D'Hautpoul that departed Lorient on 16 February 1809 to resupply French forces in the Caribbean. D'Hautpoul was captured by the British, but the other two returned to France on 29 May having captured seven British merchant ships on the voyage home.

== Bibliography ==
- Roche, Jean-Michel (2005). Dictionnaire des bâtiments de la flotte de guerre française de Colbert à nos jours [Dictionary of French Warships from Colbert to Today]. Vol. 1: 1671-1870. Roche. ISBN 978-2-9525917-0-6. OCLC 165892922.
- Winfield, Rif and Roberts, Stephen S. (2015) French Warships in the Age of Sail 1786-1861: Design, Construction, Careers and Fates. Seaforth Publishing. ISBN 978-1-84832-204-2
