= HMS Pompee =

Ship of the line of the Royal Navy

- Scale model of Achille, sister ship of HMS Pompee, on display at the Musée national de la Marine in Paris.

History

France
- Name: Pompée
- Namesake: Pompey
- Builder: Toulon shipyard
- Laid down: January 1790
- Launched: 28 May 1791
- Commissioned: February 1793
- Captured: 29 August 1793

Great Britain
- Name: HMS Pompee
- Acquired: 29 August 1793
- Reclassified: Prison hulk in Portsmouth in 1816
- Fate: Broken up in January 1817

General characteristics
- Class & type: Téméraire-class ship of the line
- Displacement: 3,069 tonneaux
- Tons burthen: 1,537 port tonneaux French service; 1,9018/94 (bm) British service
- Length: 182 ft 2 in (55.52 m) (gundeck); 148 ft 7 3/4 in (45.307 m) (keel)
- Beam: 49 ft 0 1/2 in (14.948 m)
- Depth of hold: 21 ft 10 1/2 in (6.668 m)
- Sail plan: Full-rigged ship
- Complement: 640
- Armament: French service: Lower gundeck: 28 × 36-pounder long guns; Upper gundeck: 30 × 18-pounder long guns; Forecastle and Quarter deck: 16 × 8-pounder long guns 4 × 36-pounder obusiers; British service: Lower deck: 30 × 32-pounder guns; Upper deck: 30 × 18-pounder guns; QD: 12 × 32-pounder carronades; Fc: 4 × 32-pounder carronades; Roundhouse: 8 ×18-pounder carronades

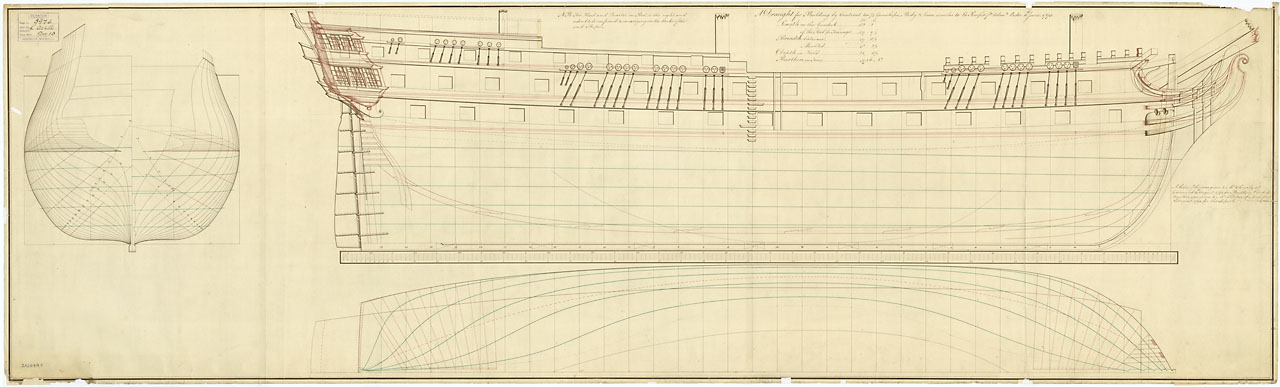
British Pompée-class ship of the line plan based on Pompée

HMS Pompee was a 74-gun ship of the line of the British Royal Navy. Built as Pompée, a Téméraire-class ship of the French Navy, she was handed over to the British at Spithead by French royalists who had fled France after the Siege of Toulon (September–December 1793) by the French Republic, only a few months after being completed. After reaching Great Britain, Pompée was registered and recommissioned as HMS Pompee and spent the entirety of her active career with the Royal Navy until she was broken up in 1817.

== Service ==
During the Siege of Toulon, Captain Poulain, her commanding officer, joined the British. Pompée fled Toulon when the city fell to the French Republicans and sailed to Britain under the temporary command of Lieutenant John Davie. She arrived at Portsmouth on 3 May 1794, and was registered on the navy list under an Admiralty order dated 29 October 1794.

Pompée was recommissioned as HMS Pompee under her first commanding officer, Captain Charles Edmund Nugent, in May 1795 and entered service with the Channel Fleet after a period of refitting. The ship retained its original French spelling of the Pompey name and not the anglicised form. From August 1795 she was under Captain James Vashon, and she was later one of the ships involved in the Spithead mutiny in 1797.

Leviathan, Pompee, Anson, Melpomene, and Childers shared in the proceeds of the capture on 10 September of Tordenshiold.

Under Captain Charles Stirling, she fought at the Battle of Algeciras Bay in 1801. In 1807 the ship, under the command of Captain Richard Dacres served in the Mediterranean squadron under Rear-Admiral Sir Sydney Smith, as part of the Vice-Admiral Duckworth's Dardanelles Operation and later the Alexandria expedition of 1807.

Pompee was on her way to Barbados on 20 October 1808 when she encountered Pylade. After a chase of 18 hours, Pompee was able to catch Pylade, which struck. Pylade was under the command of lieutenant de Vaisseau Cocherel. She was eight days out of Martinique but had not made any captures. Captain George Cockburn of Pompee described Pylade as "only Three Years old, in perfect good State, and in every Respect fit for His Majesty's Service." Her officers had also told him that she was "the fastest sailing Vessel the French had in these Seas." The Navy took Pylade into service as HMS Vimiera.

Pompee shared with Captain, Amaranthe, and Morne Fortunee in the prize money pool of £772 3s 3d for the capture of Frederick on 30 December 1808. This money was paid in June 1829.

Pompee participated in the capture of Martinique in January 1809. Later, she and D'Hautpoul took part in an action on 17 April 1809.

In April 1809, a strong French squadron arrived at the Îles des Saintes, south of Guadeloupe. There they were blockaded until 14 April, when a British force under Major-General Frederick Maitland and Captain Philip Beaver in Acasta, invaded and captured the islands. Pompee was among the naval vessels that shared in the proceeds of the capture of the islands. (Note: The prize agent for a number of the vessels involved, Henry Abbott, went bankrupt. In May 1835 there was a final payment of a dividend from his estate. A first-class share was worth 10s 2 3/4d; a sixth-class share, that of an ordinary seaman, was worth 1d. Seventh-class (landsmen) and eighth-class (boys) shares were fractions of a penny, too small to pay.)

== Fate ==
Pompee was fitted out for service as a prison hulk between September 1810 and January 1811. She was finally broken up at Woolwich in January 1817.

The acquisition of Pompée allowed the British to design a copy of the Téméraire class, the Pompée class.

== Pompey nickname ==
The Portsmouth nickname Pompey may have originated from HMS Pompee, which served as guard ship and prison hulk within Portsmouth Harbour. The northern England slang for prison is Pompey, possibly derived from criminals who may have served time aboard the prison ship Pompee. The ship's career as Portsmouth guard ship and prison hulk may have led to the ship becoming nationally associated with Portsmouth itself, with the ship's original French name becoming anglicised from Pompée to Pompey.
