= Amable Troude =

French Navy officer

Amable Gilles Troude
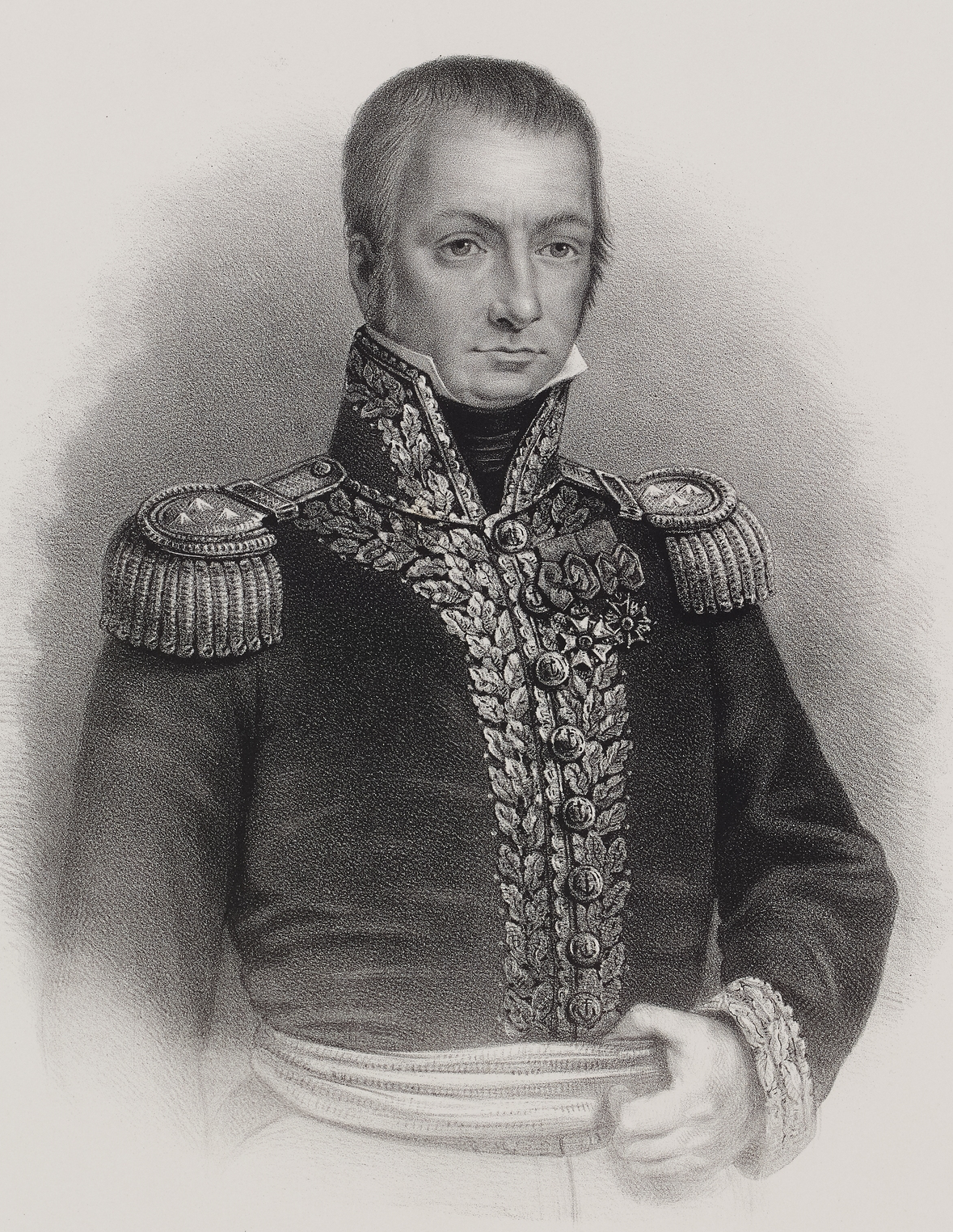
- Born: 1 June 1762; Cherbourg-en-Cotentin
- Died: 1 February 1824 (aged 61); Brest
- Military career
- Allegiance: French Empire
- Branch: French Navy
- Rank: contre-amiral
- Nickname: "l'Horace français" ("the French Horatius") - Napoléon
- Commands: Formidable
- Conflicts: Battle of Algeciras Bay; Battle of Les Sables-d'Olonne
- Awards: Name engraved on the Arc de Triomphe

Amable Gilles Troude (1 June 1762 – 1 February 1824) was a French Navy officer who served in the American Revolutionary War and the French Revolutionary and Napoleonic Wars.

== Early career ==
Troude joined the commerce navy in 1776. During the American Revolutionary War, he joined the Navy, first serving on Pluton in 1779, and the next year on Hercule, both 74-gun ships of the line. He took part in the Battle of the Saintes, and later served aboard the 28-gun frigate Crescent.

Troude returned to the commerce navy, but the French revolutionary wars called him back to active duty. He served on the Achille and on the Éole. He took part in the Glorious First of June.

Troude attained the rank of frigate captain on 21 March 1796 and took command of the Bergère.

== Battle of Algeciras ==
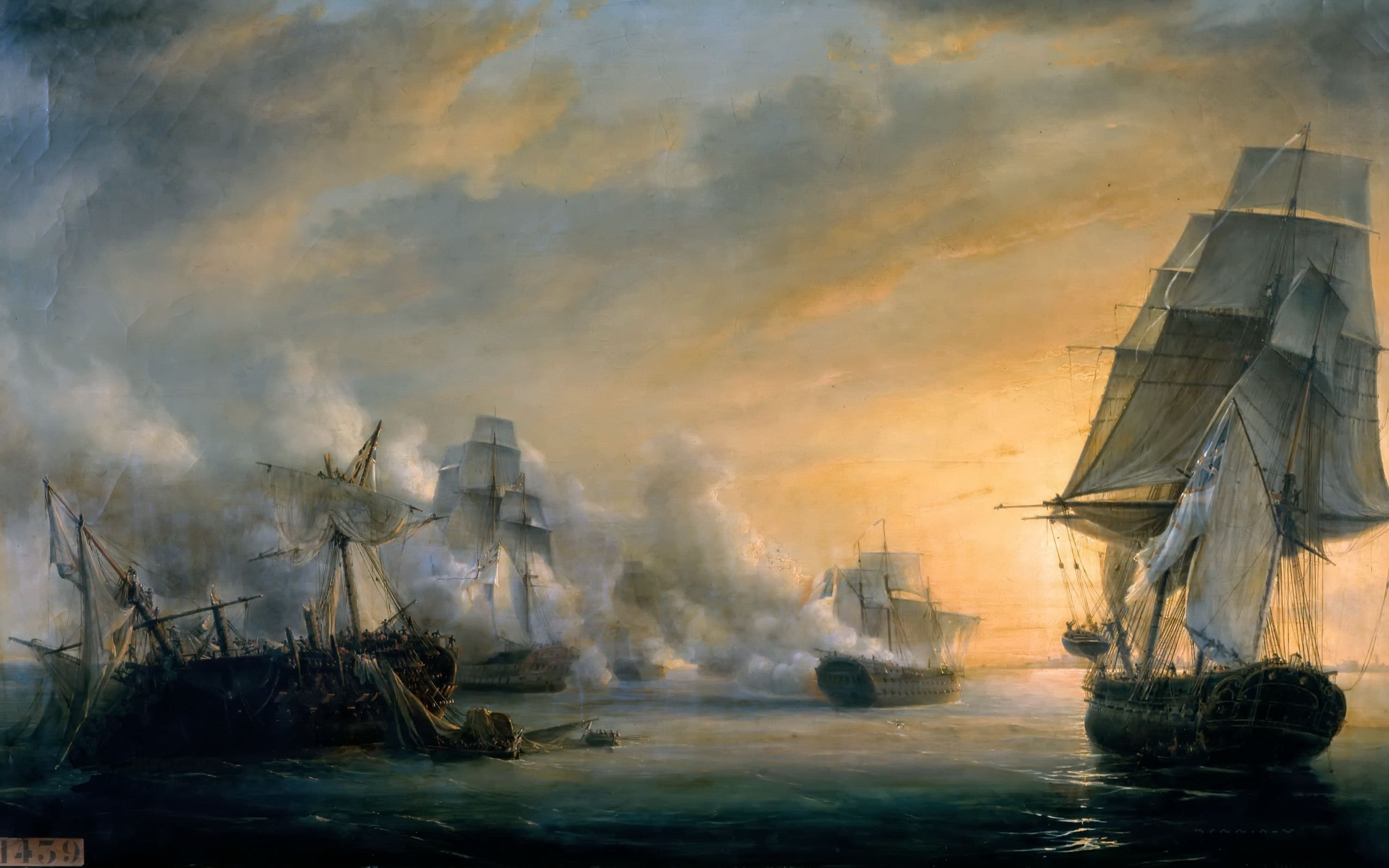
Troude's ship Formidable (second from right) at the Second Battle of Algeciras

In 1799, he was transferred on the 74-gun Tyrannicide as second in command. He took part in the First Battle of Algeciras on 6 July 1801, and received command of the 80-gun Formidable, whose captain, Landais Lalonde, had been killed in the action.

The French fleet departed Algeciras on 12 July, with Formidable lagging behind due to the damage sustained in the previous battle. She soon found herself isolated, and chased by the frigate HMS Thames and the ships of the line HMS Venerable (74 guns), HMS Caesar (80 guns) and HMS Superb (74 guns). Facing forces vastly superior combined, but at most equal taken separately, Troude let the 74-gun Venerable catch on, and battered her with his 80 guns, leaving her dismasted and barely afloat. This forced the rest of the British squadron to abandon the pursuit in order to aid Venerable, allowing Formidable to escape to Cádiz. She sailed into the harbour to the acclaim of the population, who had witnessed the fight.

Troude was promoted to capitaine de vaisseau on 14 July 1801 and was received by Bonaparte, who dubbed him "the French Horatius".

== Later career ==
In 1803, Troude took command of the Infatigable, and later of the Suffren in the Caribbean. In 1805 he participated in Allemand's expedition.

In March 1806, aboard the Armide, Troude helped repel an attack led by Robert Stopford at Les Sables-d'Olonne.

In April 1809, he led a squadron comprising 3 ships of the line and 2 fluyts to supply French positions in the Caribbean, with his flag on Courageux. Meeting the British blockade off the Îles des Saintes on 15 April, he managed to break through but lost one of his ships of the line.

Troude was promoted to contre-amiral in 1811 and given command of the flotilla based in Cherbourg. On 15 April 1814, following the Bourbon Restoration, he was tasked to ferry Louis XVIII from England to Calais, aboard the Lys.
