= HMS Thrush (1806) =

Sloop of the Royal Navy

History

Great Britain
- Name: Prince of Wales
- Operator: HM Revenue Service
- Builder: John and William Scott, Greenock
- Launched: 1794
- Fate: Sold 1806

United Kingdom
- Name: HMS Thrush
- Acquired: 1806 by purchase
- Fate: Foundered 1815; salvaged and sold

General characteristics
- Tons burthen: 3073/94 (bm)
- Length: Overall: 96 ft 4 in (29.4 m); Keel: 78 ft 10 1/2 in (24.0 m)
- Beam: 27 ft 0 5/8 in (8.2 m)
- Depth of hold: 13 ft 3 1/2 in (4.1 m)
- Propulsion: Sails
- Sail plan: Ship
- Complement: Excise service: 50; Royal Navy: 121
- Armament: Excise service: 20 guns; Royal Navy:18 × 6-pounder guns

HMS Thrush was launched in 1794 as the Prince of Wales, which served the Customs Service as a revenue brig. In 1806 the British Admiralty purchased her and the Royal Navy renamed her HMS Thrush as there was already an HMS Prince of Wales in service. Thrush spent her brief active service on the Jamaica Station. She was converted to a powder hulk in late 1809 and foundered at Port Royal in 1815; she was salvaged, and sold.

== Origins ==
Some sources describe Prince of Wales as the first naval order in Scotland. However, these sources recognise that she was built as a revenue brig. They report that the Admiralty purchased her in 1803 and re-rigged from a brig to a full rigged ship.

Prince of Wales, a vessel belonging to the Excise service of Scotland, in 1799 was responsible for the coast between the Mull of Cantire and Cape Wrath. She was of 300 tons (bm), and armed with 20 guns. She had a crew of 50 men under William Murray.

== Royal Navy career ==
Prince of Wales arrived at Portsmouth on 2 June 1806, and the Navy renamed her on 12 September. She then lay there until was fitted out between March 1808 and 25 June.

Commander Charles Webb commissioned Thrush in April 1808. He then sailed her to Jamaica on 18 July. Thrush detained Maria, which was sailing from Cuacoa to St Croix. Maria arrived at Jamaica on 21 January 1809. Thrush also detained Nancy, Fresback, master, which had been sailing from Guernsey to Jacmel. Nancy arrived at Jamaica between 22 and 29 April.

In May 1809 Commander Henry Spark Jones replaced Webb. In the summer of 1809, Thrush participated in the blockade of San Domingo until the city fell on 11 July to Spanish forces and the British under Hugh Lyle Carmichael. The blockading squadron, under Captain William Pryce Cumby in the 64-gun third rate Polyphemus, also included Aurora, Tweed, Sparrow, Lark, Griffon, Moselle, and Fleur de la Mer. (Note: In January 1826 prize money was paid for stores captured at Santo Domingo. A first-class share was worth £7 10s 11d; a sixth-class share, that of an ordinary seaman, was worth 2s 5d. In October 1832, prize money was paid for the ordnance stores. A first-class share was worth £67 3s 5d; a sixth-class share was worth £1 1s 3d.)

== Fate ==
In October 1809 the Navy converted Thrush to a powder hulk at Port Royal. Thrush foundered in July 1815 while she lay at anchor at Port Royal. The Navy salvaged her and sold her.

== Thrush in literature ==
In the novel Mansfield Park, by the famed English author Jane Austen, the protagonist, Fanny Price, visits Portsmouth as her brother William is about to sail in Thrush. William has been promoted to lieutenant and appointed to Thrush, which has just gone out of Portsmouth Harbour and is as lying at Spithead. Austen may very well have seen Thrush fitting out there in early 1808, and drawn on her memory for a suitable appointment for a new lieutenant when she wrote the book between 1811 and 1813. (Jane Austen had two brothers who became officers in the British Navy: Admiral of the Fleet Sir Francis Austen, GCB and Rear Admiral Charles Austen, CB.
