= HMS Tweed (1807) =

Sloop of the Royal Navy

History

United Kingdom
- Ordered: 30 November 1805
- Builder: Thomas Ireonger, Littlehampton
- Laid down: March 1806
- Launched: 19 January 1807
- Fate: Wrecked 5 November 1813

General characteristics
- Class & type: Cormorant-class ship-sloop (Revived)
- Tons burthen: 43083/94 (bm)
- Length: Overall:109 ft 1 in (33.2 m); Keel:91 ft 3 1/4 in (27.8 m)
- Beam: 29 ft 9 1/2 in (9.1 m)
- Depth of hold: 9 ft 0 in (2.7 m)
- Complement: 121
- Armament: Upper deck: 16 × 32-pounder carronades; QD: 6 × 18-pounder carronades; Fc: 2 × 6-pounder chase guns + 2 × 18-pounder carronades

HMS Tweed was launched in 1807. On the Jamaica station she captured two small privateers and several merchant vessels. On the North Sea station she captured one small privateers and several merchant vessels. She was wrecked on 5 November 1813 with the loss of more than half her crew.

== Career ==
Commander Thomas Symonds commissioned Tweed in March 1807. He sailed for Jamaica on 30 June 1807. Tweed arrived at Barbados on 25 August, having come via Madeira with a fleet that she had been convoying. On the way she captured Fly on 10 July. Tweed arrived at Jamaica on 6 September.

On 30 September Tweed captured Antionette.

She sent into Jamaica Mary, Parsons, master, which had been sailing home to New York from Santo Domingo.

On 29 February 1808 Tweed captured the Spanish letter of marque schooner Santissima Trinidad. She had sailed from Puerto Cavallo and was bound for Cadiz. Although she was pierced for 14 guns, she had only four mounted. She had a crew of 20 men.

On 16 March Tweed captured the French privateer schooner Aventure. Aventure was armed with three guns and had a crew of 52 men. A few days earlier Tweed had captured a small schooner that Aventure had captured and was using as a tender.

Tweed detained and sent into Jamaica the Swedish ship Lychars. She had been sailing from Cape François to Philadelphia. Tweed had captured Lyckan on 15 May 1808.

On 17 April 1809, HMS Pompée, HMS Recruit, and HMS Neptune, captured D'Hautpoul off Puerto Rico after a chase over three nights and two days. Tweed was in sight and so was able to share in the prize money. (Note: A first-class share was worth £44 1s 7 1/2d; a sixth-class share was worth 6s 6d.)

In June Captain William Pryce Cumby received command of a squadron consisting of Polyphemus, Aurora, Tweed, Sparrow, Thrush, Griffon, Lark, Moselle, Fleur de la Mer, and Pike. They sailed from Port Royal on 7 June with troops under Major-General Hugh Lyle Carmichael to assist the Spanish forces besieging the French in the city of San Domingo. Captain Symonds was in command of the sloops, schooners, and gun-brigs during the blockade. The blockade sped up the city's surrender by cutting off the enemy's accustomed supply by sea. (Note: Tweed shared in the prize money for some vessels captured at Santo Domingo. A first class share was worth £14 8d; a sixth-class share was worth 2s 7d. One payment of prize money occurred in October 1832. A first-class share was worth £67 3s 5d; a sixth-class share was worth £1 1s 3d.) Cumby sent Tweed to Port Royal, where she arrived on the evening of 12 July with news of the French surrender on the 6th.

On 7 October 1809 Tweed seized the American schooner Success for a breech of the revenue laws. (Note: A first-class share was worth £109 11s 1 1/4d; a fifth-class share was worth 16s 2 3/4d,)

On 11 December Tweed seized the American schooner Daniel and Robert for a breech of the revenue laws. (Note: A first-class share was worth £32 10s 10d; a fifth-class share was worth 4s 6 3/4d,)

Tweed returned to England in 1810. In October she was in the North sea, where on the 17th she captured the Danish privateer Steinbill, of 10 guns and 30 men. She was out of "Syet" (possibly Sylt), and Tweed sent her into Yarmouth. On the same day Tweed captured the Danish sloop Nicklow.

On 15 February 1811 Tweed captured the Danish vessels Anna Maria, Dorothea, Elizabeth, Concordia, and Active. Tweed also captured the Danish sloop Twende Bruders. (Note: Two Brothers, a prize to Tweed, was lost near Leith.)

On 13 June 1813 Tweed captured Conde d'Atmada.

Symonds received promotion to post captain on 29 September 1813. In October Commander William Mather replaced Symonds. He had been promoted to the rank of Commander and into Tweed from HMS Rapide.

== Fate ==
On 5 November 1813 Tweed wrecked in Shoal Bay, Newfoundland. Sixty-four men died, including five who died onshore from injuries and exposure. The cause of the wreck was due to the combination of an error in the soundings shown in the Admiralty chart and a strong current that had pushed Tweed inshore.
