= Thomas Huskisson =

British Royal Navy officer (1784–1844)

Admiral Thomas Huskisson
- Born: 1784; Eastry, Kent
- Died: 1844 (aged 59–60); Upper Deal, Kent
- Military career
- Allegiance: United Kingdom
- Branch: Royal Navy
- Service years: 1780s to 1819
- Rank: Royal Navy Admiral
- Commands: Pelorus; Garland; Euryalus; Leeward Islands Station
- Conflicts: French Revolutionary Wars • Battle of Groix • Capture of Trinidad; Napoleonic Wars • Battle of Cape Finisterre
- Awards: Knight Commander of the Order of the Bath

Thomas Huskisson (1784–1844) was an officer in the Royal Navy. Thomas Huskisson was half-brother of William Huskisson, the British politician.

== Naval career ==
Huskisson joined the Royal Navy in 1800 and saw action at the Battle of Trafalgar on HMS Defence in 1805. In early 1808 Lieutenant Huskisson commissioned the schooner Fleur de la Mer. He had come out to the Jamaica station on Melpomene, and once there Vice-Admiral Sir B. S. Rowley appointed him to Fleur de la Mer and put him to cruising off San Domingo. There he rescued a gentleman who had fallen afoul of Henri Christophe. Huskisson also visited Cartagena, where he was able to intercede and win the release of seven persons who had accompanied General Miranda's British-supported and unsuccessful attempted invasion of the Captaincy General of Venezuela in 1806.

Huskisson was promoted to commander on 19 January 1809, but did not find out about his promotion until May, at which time he transferred to command the Cruizer-class brig-sloop Pelorus. On 16 October, Pelorus and Hazard discovered a privateer schooner moored under the St Mary battery. Fire from Hazard and Pelorus destroyed the battery while boats from both ships boarded the privateer. Her crew had abandoned the vessel but fired from the shore where two field pieces joined them. Unable to move the prize, the British blew her up. The privateer was armed with one long 18-pounder on a pivot carriage and two swivels; the British estimated that she had had a crew of 80-100 men. The action cost the British 15 men dead and wounded, with Pelorus accounting for two dead and six wounded, one mortally. In February 1810 Pelorus participated in the capture of Guadeloupe.

Huskisson was promoted captain in 1811 and took command of the 22-gun Laurel-class post ship Garland.

In June 1815 Huskisson recommissioned the frigate Euryalus. On 7 July she captured the French vessels Aimable Antoinette and Marie. From 25 August 1818 to end 1820, Euryalus was in the West Indies. She served as the flagship in the Leeward Islands from November 1819 when Huskisson was promoted to Commodore and appointed Commander-in-Chief of the Leeward Islands Station: Huskisson continued in this role until May 1820.

Huskisson became Paymaster of the Navy in 1827 and was admitted to Greenwich Hospital in 1830.

== Works ==
- His memoirs were published as Eyewitness to Trafalgar edited by David Beaumont Ellison. (Ellisons Editions 1984 - place of publication unknown). ISBN 0-946092-09-5.

== Family history ==
Thomas' half-brother was William Huskisson MP, who married Emily Milbanke, the youngest daughter of Admiral Mark Milbanke, the commander-in-chief at Portsmouth. Admiral Milbanke assisted his entry into the Navy.

His brother John Huskisson was commissioned in 1798 into the Army and served with the 51st Regiment in Ceylon, while his other brother George Huskisson was commissioned in the Royal Marines.

In 1813 Thomas Huskisson married Elizabeth Wedge (1788–1873), daughter of Francis Wedge of Forton, Staffordshire, and had 6 children, including William Milbanke Huskisson, of the Foreign Office and John Huskisson, a lieutenant colonel in the Royal Marines.

Military offices
Preceded by Donald Campbell	Commander-in-Chief, Leeward Islands Station; 1819–1820	Succeeded by William Fahie
