= Charles Tyler =

Royal Navy Admiral (1760–1835)

Admiral Sir Charles Tyler GCB
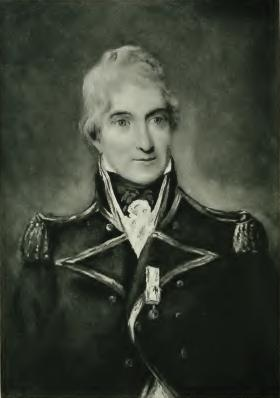
- Born: 1760; Cavan
- Died: 28 September 1835 Gloucester
- Buried: St Nicholas Church, St Nicholas, Cardiff, Wales
- Allegiance: United Kingdom of Great Britain and Ireland
- Branch: Royal Navy
- Rank: Admiral
- Commands: HMS Meleager; HMS Diadem; HMS Aigle; HMS Warrior commander of a unit of Sea Fencibles; HMS Tonnant Cape of Good Hope Station
- Conflicts: American Revolutionary War; French Revolutionary Wars; Siege of Toulon; Siege of Calvi; Invasion of Corsica; Battle of Genoa; Battle of Copenhagen; Napoleonic Wars; Battle of Trafalgar

Admiral Sir Charles Tyler, GCB (1760 – 28 September 1835) was a naval officer in the British Royal Navy who gained fame during the Napoleonic Wars as a naval captain that fought at the Battle of Copenhagen (1801) and Battle of Trafalgar, becoming one of Nelson's Band of Brothers.

== Early life ==
Tyler was born in County Cavan, Ireland, in 1760, the son of Captain Peter Tyler of the Oxfordshire Light Infantry and his wife the Hon. Anna Maria Roper, daughter of Henry Roper, 8th Baron Teynham. His father died when he was three years old. In 1771, at eleven years of age, he joined the Royal Navy aboard HMS Barfleur (1768) under Captain Andrew Snape Hamond as a Captain's servant boy. His rapid promotion to the rank of midshipsman within his second year at sea suggest the captain favored him and may have known his family. He rose steadily through the ranks during the American Revolutionary War, although during that period he had little opportunity to distinguish himself. In 1779 he was promoted to lieutenant, jumping to commander in 1782 and retaining his position throughout the peacetime Navy of 1783 to 1790, when he was made post-captain.

== French Revolutionary Wars and Napoleonic Wars ==
Upon the outbreak of the French Revolutionary Wars, Tyler was in command of the frigate HMS Meleager during the siege of Toulon and the invasion of Corsica the following year. He first met Nelson in the course of these campaigns, and was present when the latter lost an eye at the Siege of Calvi.

Transferring to HMS Diadem soon afterwards, he was present at Lord Hotham's disappointing Battle of Genoa and then spent the next several years operating against North African pirates in the frigate Aigle before she was accidentally wrecked on Plane Island. Returning to the fleet, Tyler was acquitted of blame for the loss of his ship and was given the ship of the line HMS Warrior which he commanded off Cádiz before returning to England and participating under Admiral Nelson at the Battle of Copenhagen where he was commended for his actions.

During the Peace of Amiens Tyler was returned to shore as commander of a unit of Sea Fencibles, but in 1803 was back at sea, commanding the 80-gun HMS Tonnant, which Nelson had captured at the battle of the Nile. Tonnant was a large, modern ship with a heavy payload, capable of taking on the largest enemy ships. Tyler carefully drilled his crew until Tonnant was amongst the most efficient and powerful ships in the fleet. Tyler was specially requested by Nelson for the Cadiz blockade in 1805, and thus participated in the Battle of Trafalgar, although not before he was forced to travel to Naples where his son was under arrest for desertion from the navy (out of love for a ballerina) and crippling debts. Unknown to Tyler until much later was the fact that Nelson personally paid the young man's debt and used his influence to have him released and reinstated into the Navy albeit with a stern warning about responsibilities.

=== Trafalgar ===
At Trafalgar, Tyler was originally second in line from Collingwood's flagship HMS Royal Sovereign, but due to its speed was swapped to third in line. Because of this forward positioning the ship was quickly and intensely engaged in the battle. Tonnant first forced the Spanish Monarca to surrender (although she later attempted to escape) before colliding with the Algésiras which soon became hopelessly entangled in the British ship's rigging. This resulted in a savage series of close-range bombardments and boarding actions during which Tyler was shot in the thigh and French Admiral Magon was killed. Once the Algésiras finally surrendered, the Tonnant although badly battered, was still able to attack and capture the San Juan Nepomuceno at the close of the battle.

Struggling back to Gibraltar with over 70 casualties on board, including Tyler himself, the Tonnant relied heavily on other ships for aid, and thus was unable to prevent the Algésiras from escaping to Cadiz Harbour after her crew rose up against the prize crew, although the San Juan Nepomuceno did arrive at Gibraltar thanks to heroic efforts by her Spanish crew and British prize crew. Briefly returning to London to celebrate and recover, Tyler received the thanks of Parliament and numerous awards from the nation before returning to his ship in the Mediterranean, where he continued to serve, overseeing the surrender of the Russian fleet at Lisbon in 1808.

== Later career ==
Tyler's continued service brought more honours, including command of the Cape of Good Hope Station based in Cape Town in 1812, a role which was followed by post-war promotion to rear admiral. In April 1816 he was initiated into the Order of the Bath. He was named Vice Admiral. Following his elevation to admiral he did not hold any more sea postings, retiring and reaching full Admiral of the White and Knight Grand Cross of the Order of the Bath by his death in September 1835 in Gloucester, just two months after the death of his wife of many years, Margaret. They were buried together in the St Nicholas Church in Glamorgan where a marble monument still can be seen to their memory.

== Family ==
He married two times. His first wife was Anne Rice with whom he had three children. She died early into the marriage leaving him as a young widower. He remarried and his second wife was Margaret Leach with whom he had three children. From this marriage one of his sons called George Tyler followed him into the navy and rose to the rank of Vice-Admiral. It later emerged that Admiral Nelson had cleared debt for the George Tyler while he was a junior officer with a strong reprimand shortly before the Battle of Trafalgar. George settled down and got married and through this marriage his daughter Caroline Tyler was born. She married the Earl of Dunraven and Mount Earl and the couple inherited Adare Manor in Ireland. Her son Colonel Windham Wyndham-Quin wrote the biography on his famous great-grandfather titled 'Sir Charles Tyler – Admiral of the White'. In 2005 the family sold Admiral Tyler's sword at Bonham's auction house for $430,000. The family tree of the Tylers shows the family was divided between living in Wales and Ireland with several rising to the highest ranks of the army and the navy with several Admirals and Generals listed through several generations including a great-grandson Admiral Godfrey Harry Brydges Mundy.

== See also ==
- O'Byrne, William Richard (1849). "Tyler, George" . A Naval Biographical Dictionary . John Murray – via Wikisource.

Military offices
Preceded by Robert Stopford	Commander-in-Chief, Cape of Good Hope Station; 1812–1814	Succeeded by George Cockburn
