= HMS Polyphemus (1782) =

British ship of the line (1782–1827)

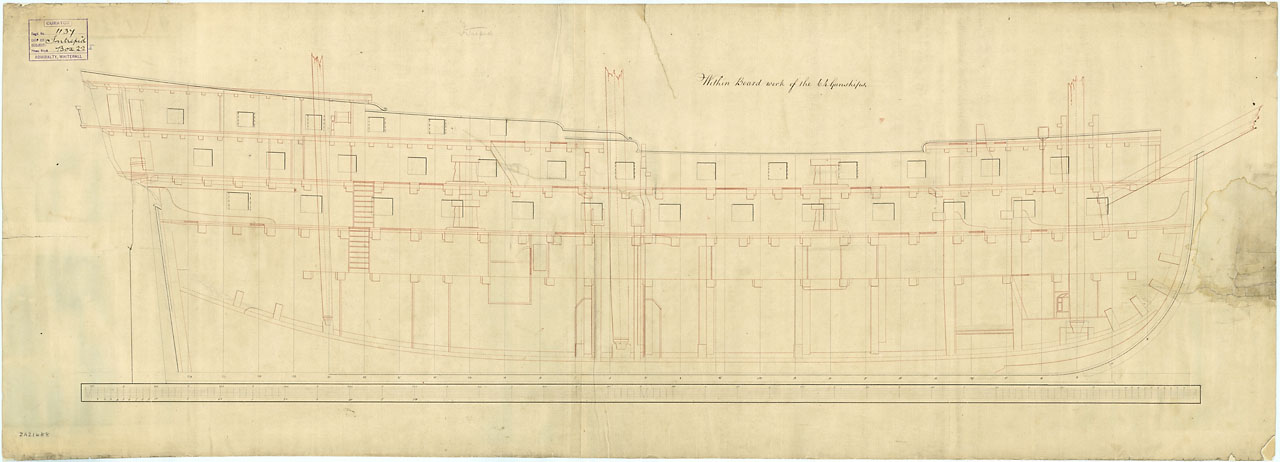
- Polyphemus

History

Great Britain
- Name: HMS Polyphemus
- Namesake: Polyphemus the Cyclops
- Ordered: 1 December 1773
- Builder: Sheerness Dockyard
- Laid down: January 1776
- Launched: 27 April 1782
- Honours and awards: Battle of Cape Spartel; Naval General Service Medal with clasps: "Copenhagen 1801"; "Trafalgar"; "16 July Boat Service 1806"; Siege of Santo Domingo
- Fate: Broken up, 1827
- Notes: Powder hulk from 1813

General characteristics
- Class & type: Intrepid-class ship of the line
- Tons burthen: 140871/94 (bm)
- Length: 160 ft 0 in (48.8 m) (gundeck); 133 ft 3 in (40.6 m) (keel)
- Beam: 44 ft 7 in (13.6 m)
- Depth of hold: 19 ft 0 in (5.8 m)
- Propulsion: Sails
- Sail plan: Full-rigged ship
- Armament: Gundeck: 26 × 24-pounder guns; Upper gundeck: 26 × 18-pounder guns; QD: 10 × 4-pounder guns; Fc: 2 × 9-pounder guns

HMS Polyphemus, a 64-gun third-rate ship of the line of the Royal Navy, launched on 27 April 1782 at Sheerness. She participated in the 1801 Battle of Copenhagen, the Battle of Trafalgar, and the Siege of Santo Domingo. In 1813 she became a powder hulk and was broken up in 1827.

== Early career ==
Polyphemus was laid down at Sheerness in 1776. On 26 April 1778, His Majesty King George III visited Sheerness to inspect the dockyards. There he saw Polyphemus, which was standing in her frame to season. She was launched in 1782 and commissioned under Captain William C. Finch, who then sailed her to Gibraltar.

She was part of a British fleet under Admiral Richard Howe successfully resupplied Gibraltar, then under siege by Bourbon forces. Shortly after, the British fleet met the Franco-Spanish fleet under Admiral Luis de Córdova y Córdova on 20 October 1782. The consequent battle of Cape Spartel was indecisive. Polyphemus was part of the second division of the van, and suffered four men wounded.

In late 1782, Admiral Sir Richard Hughes took a squadron that included Polyphemus, under Captain Thomas Sotheby, out to the West Indies. On their way the British encountered a French convoy off Martinique. The action of 6 December 1782 lasted 40 minutes, during which time Ruby, under Captain John Collins, captured the French 64-gun ship Solitaire, under Jean-Charles de Borda. Solitaire had 35 men killed and 55 wounded whilst Ruby had only two men wounded. Two days later the squadron arrived at Barbados. The Royal Navy took Solitaire into service as HMS Solitaire. Polyphemus shared with Ruby in the head money for the capture of Solitaire, while the other vessels of the British squadron did not, suggesting that Polyphemus assisted Ruby.

At the end of the war in 1783, her crew was paid off in June. Then she received some repairs between December 1783 and December 1784.

== French Revolutionary Wars ==
In December 1793, after the outbreak of war with France her fitting out at Chatham took until June 1794. Captain George Lumsdaine commissioned her in April.

=== Irish station ===
Polyphemus and Santa Margarita shared in the recapture on 21 September 1795 of the vessel Hibberts. Polyphemus was operating off Queenstown, Ireland, on 22 October when she took possession at Cork of the Dutch 64-gun ship Overijsel (or Overyssel), which the Royal Navy took into service as HMS Overyessel. Polyphemus then became the flagship for Vice-Admiral Robert Kingsmill, at Queenstown, before undergoing repairs in May and June 1796 at Plymouth. In August Polyphemus left the East India fleet west of the Canaries and returned to Plymouth two weeks or so later.

In December 1796, Polyphemus and Apollo were off the Irish coast when they captured the 14-gun French privateer schooner Deux Amis, of 100 tons bm and 80 men. The Royal Navy took her into service under her existing name. On the 31st Polyphemus captured the Tartar.

There was only a handful of ships based at Cork under Rear-Admiral Kingsmill, principally Polyphemus and a frigate squadron, in late December 1796 when the French launched the Expédition d'Irlande, an attempt to create a republican uprising in Ireland. Polyphemus seized the transport Justine on 30 December and HMS Jason captured the transport Suffren shortly afterwards, although the French frigate Tartu recaptured Suffren. On 5 January 1797 Polyphemus captured Tartu, of 44 guns and 625 men (including troops). The Royal Navy took her into service as HMS Uranie. Polyphemus also captured another transport, but the weather being bad and night falling, she did not take possession. Lumsdaine reported that the transport was leaky and making distress signals, but that he was unable to assist. He thought it highly likely that she had sunk. This may have been the Fille-Unique, which sank in the Bay of Biscay on 6 January.

Between November 1799 and March 1800 she underwent repairs at Chatham. She was recommissioned in 1799, again under Lumsdaine.

=== Baltic service ===
Captain John Lawford was appointed to command of Polyphemus on 1 August and took up his position on three days later. She sailed from Yarmouth on 9 August 1800, with a squadron under Vice-Admiral Archibald Dickson in Monarch bound for Denmark. Because of lack of wind the faster sailing vessels had to tow the slower ones and it was 15 August before they reached The Skaw. The next day the whole squadron advanced as far as the mouth of the Sound where the Danes had anchored three 74-gun ships, later increased to four, between Kronberg Castle and the Swedish shore. Because of gales the Admiral sheltered his squadron in Elsinore Roads and then went in Romney as far as Sophienberg Castle to talk with Lord Whitworth, who was negotiating with the Danish government. (Note: Sophienberg was a royal coastal summer residence built in 1744 that the Danish monarchy sold to the government in 1790. It is near Rungsted, a short train ride north of Copenhagen.) After matters were resolved the squadron returned to Yarmouth in September.

In March 1801, Rear-Admiral Thomas Graves raised his flag on Polyphemus, replacing Kingsmill. Polyphemus was with the fleet under the command of Admiral Sir Hyde Parker that bombarded Copenhagen on 2 April. The British objective was to break up the second League of Armed Neutrality, which also included Sweden and Prussia, that Tzar Paul I of Russia had established.

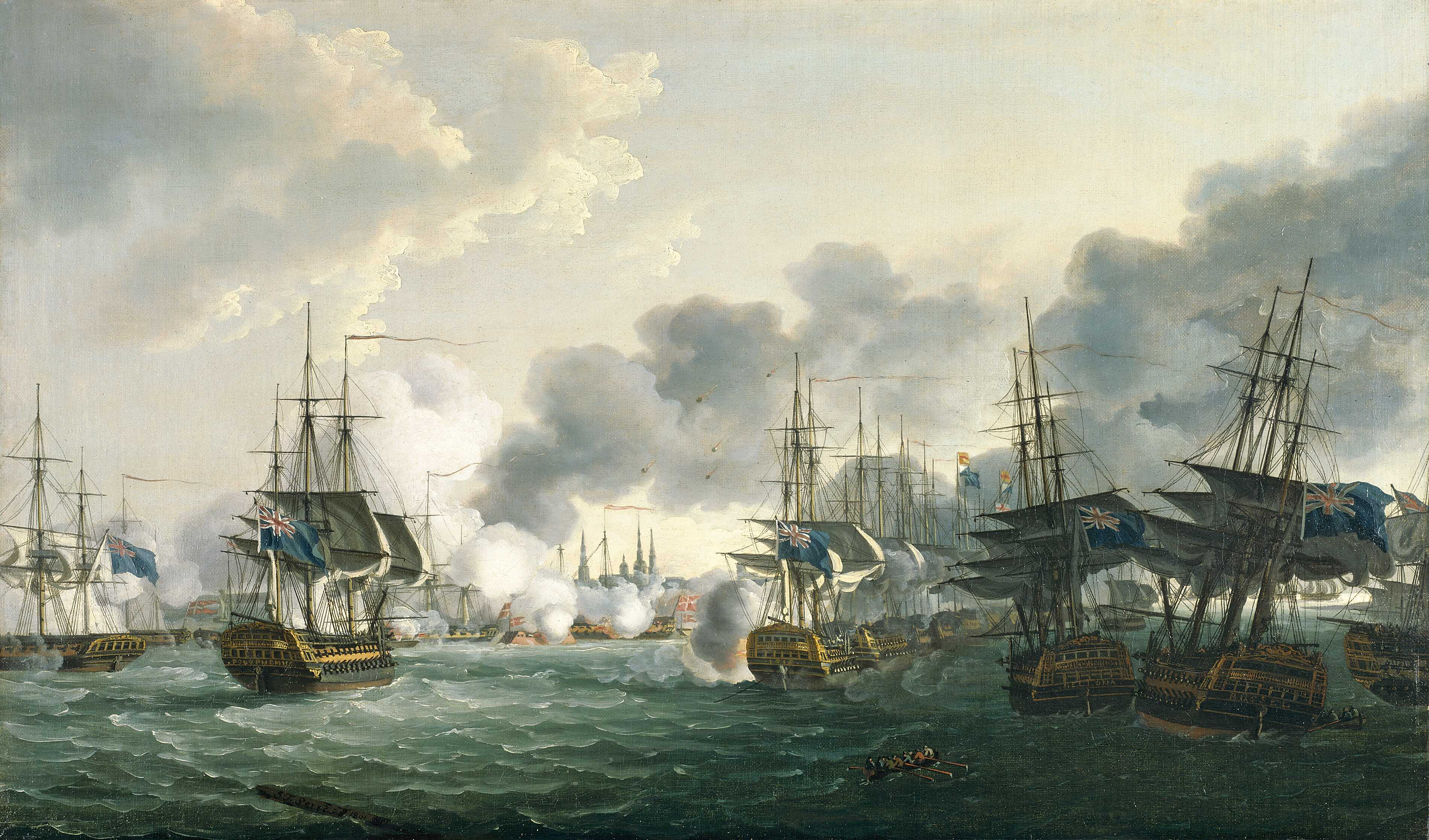
Polyphemus at Copenhagen, 1801

During the battle, Polyphemus and Desiree came to the assistance of the 50-gun fourth rate Isis, which was being hard-pressed by the Danes' 56-gun ship Provesteenen, and succeeded in silencing her. Polyphemus lost six men killed, and 25 men wounded. In 1847 the Admiralty awarded the Naval General Service Medal with clasp "Copenhagen 1801" to all surviving claimants from the battle.

The division of the North Sea fleet commanded by Admiral Thomas in Polyphemus returned to Yarmouth from the Baltic Sea on 13 July and then sailed to join Admiral Dickson's squadron blockading the Dutch fleet in the Texel. (Note: Dickson's squadron included Veteran, Ruby, Otter, Vesuvius, Bruizer, Cracker, Hasty, Teazer, Pincher, Alecto, Sulphur, Explosion, Speedwell, Queen, Espiegle, and the hired armed lugger Speculator.) At some point Graves transferred his flag to Defiance.

In April 1802 Polyphemus went into ordinary, following the Treaty of Amiens that ended the war.

== Napoleonic Wars ==
After war with France resumed in 1803, Polyphemus underwent fitting out at Chatham between March and September 1804. Captain Robert Redmill recommissioned her in July for the Channel, but apparently was only temporarily in command.

Polyphemus joined the Cadiz squadron under Admiral John Orde. She shared with Donegal and Defence in the proceeds from the capture on 26 November of the Spanish ship Virgen del Rosario.

In late November or early December (different records disagree), Polyphemus, under Lawford's command, captured several Spanish ships. One was the San Joseph (alias Favourite). The snow Saint Josef had been sailing from La Guayra to Cadiz with a cargo of indigo, cocoa, cochineal, and cotton. Another was the Santo Christo, which had been sailing from Montevideo to Cadiz with a cargo of hides and copper. She also captured the St Edward. The St Edward (or Edward), was sailing from Vera Cruz to Cadiz with a cargo of cocoa, cochineal, and cotton, and $98,539. Lastly, Polyphemus captured the Bon Air, which was sailing from Vera Cruz to Cadiz with a cargo of cocoa, indigo, and cochineal, and $20,000.

Three days later Polyphemus and Lively captured the Spanish frigate Santa Gertruyda off Cape St Mary. A frigate of 40-guns, she was armed only with 14, and was sailing from Peru and Mexico to Coruna when Polyphemus captured her. Polyphemus and Santa Gertruyda separated in a gale that damaged the Spanish ship, which nonetheless reached Plymouth on 10 January 1805, in tow by the armed defence ship Harriet, which had encountered Santa Gertruyda some days after the gale. Santa Gertruyda was carrying $1,215,000, and merchandize. (Note: The amount that a seaman received in a prize money disbursement in May 1808 is difficult to read from the London Gazette, but the amount appears to be on the order of £34 5s 10d, or an amount equivalent to more than a year and a half of salary.) Once she arrived in Plymouth, the Royal Navy took her into service as Santa Gertruda, but did not commission the 40-year-old ship. Instead she served as a receiving ship.

Lawford was still in command on 8 February 1805 when Polyphemus captured Marianna. She arrived in Plymouth a few days later.

=== Trafalgar ===
Under Redmill, Polyphemus took part in the Battle of Trafalgar in October 1805. She fought in the Lee column, and lost two men killed and four wounded. She engaged the French ships Neptune and Achille and after the battle captured the Argonauta. Lastly, Polyphemus towed HMS Victory, carrying Nelson's body, back to Gibraltar.

Parliament voted a grant of £300,000 to the participants in the battle, payable in September 1806. (Note: A seaman or marine received £4 12s 6d.) Then in March 1807 there was a distribution of prize money for the hull, stores, and head money for four French and two Spanish ships captured at Trafalgar. (Note: A seaman received £1 17s 6d.) In 1847 the Admiralty awarded the Naval General Service Medal with clasp "Trafalgar" to all surviving claimants from the battle.

In January 1806, Polyphemus and the frigate Sirius were escorting a convoy from Gibraltar when they encountered a French squadron under Admiral Willaumez. The French succeeded in capturing two of the merchant vessels and four of the French fleet unsuccessfully chased Sirius for two hours, but forcing her to separate from the convoy.

On 3 April 1806 Polyphemus, Fame, and Africa were off Madeira, having escorted the East India Fleet southward. Seventeen days later, Polyphemus shared in the capture of the Spanish ship Estrella. (Note: A seaman received £1 5s 1d.) One week later Polyphemus, Fame, and Africa shared in the capture of the Spanish ship San Pablo and her cargo. (Note: A seaman received £1 10s 5d.) St Pablo (or St Pablus), was sailing from Vera Cruz with a valuable cargo.

=== French coast ===
In July 1806, she was with Lord St. Vincent's squadron off Ushant. On 14 July her boats, together with others of the squadron, were taken by the Iris to Captain John Tremayne Rodd in Indefatigable off Rochefort to attack two French corvettes and a convoy at the entrance to the Garonne. The weather on 15 July appeared suitable for the attempt but after the boats left a strong wind blew up and although they managed to capture the corvette or brig Caesar, they could not prevent the convoy escaping up river. The French were expecting the attack and put up a strong resistance. The British lost six men killed, 36 wounded and 21 missing. Indefatigable alone lost two killed and 11 wounded. Polyphemus had two men lightly wounded. The 21 missing men were in a boat from Revenge; a later report suggested that most, if not all, had been taken prisoner. The majority of the boats were either shot through or so badly stove in that they were swamped, and had to be cut adrift from the brig as she was brought out under fire from the batteries and the ex-British brig Teaser. The vessels claiming prize money included Pilchard and the hired armed lugger Nile, in addition to the various ships of the line and frigates. This cutting out expedition resulted in the participants qualifying for the Naval General Service Medal with clasp "16 July Boat Service 1806".

Caesar, of 18 guns, had a crew of 86 men according to her roster, and was under the command of lieutenant de vaisseau Louis François Hector Fourré. She was five years old, coppered, 88' by 23', and "appears fit for His Majesty's Service", according to Rodd. The Royal Navy took her into service as the brig HMS Cesar. Head money for the capture was paid in June 1829.

In July 1806 Polyphemus was recommissioned. Captain Joseph O. Masefield replaced Redmill in September.

In the action of 25 September 1806, a British squadron of six ships of the line that was keeping a close blockade of the port as part of the Atlantic campaign of 1806 intercepted a French squadron comprising five frigates and two corvettes, sailing to the French West Indies with supplies and reinforcements. The British ships, under the command of Commodore Sir Samuel Hood sighted the French convoy shortly after it left Biscay port of Rochefort. The British caught the French convoy after a five-hour pursuit, although they had become separated from one another during the chase. The British captured the French frigates Infatigable, Minerve, Armide, and Gloire. Polyphemus shared in the prize money for these four frigates.

Captain John Broughton replaced Masefield in October.

=== Americas ===
In 1807 Polyphemus, under the command of Captain Peter Heywood, became the flagship of Rear-Admiral Sir George Murray, off South America.

In March Murray's squadron carried troops from the Cape of Good Hope to South America in support of a second failed attempt to wrest the River Plate area from the Spanish. A detachment of sailors and marines from Polyphemus served on shore in the Advance Brigade during the disastrous (for the British) attack on Buenos Aires. Admiral Murray evacuated Lieutenant Crowley of Polyphemus, who had been wounded, and his men, aboard the frigate Néréide.

Polyphemus remained in the River Plate area, carrying out surveying and merchant vessel protection duties. Between January and February 1808 Polyphemus underwent a refit at Portsmouth.

Heywood remained in command until May 1808, when Captain William Pryce Cumby replaced him. Cumby had been lieutenant and then acting commander of HMS Bellerophon at Trafalgar.

Polyphemus became the flagship of Vice-Admiral Bartholomew Samuel Rowley. In July she sailed for Jamaica, convoying a large fleet of merchantmen, and taking the Vice-Admiral to take up his appointment as chief of the station. Since he resided on shore with his flag in Shark, Polyphemus was able to undertake cruises against the enemy.

On the morning of 14 November Cumby sent his boats, under Lieutenant Joseph Daly in the barge, to chase a schooner attempting to enter the harbour at San Domingo. An hour later the British succeed in boarding the schooner despite facing a hail of grape and musketry. Their quarry proved to be the French navy schooner Colibry, of three carriage guns and a crew of 63 men under the command of lieutenant de vaisseau Deyrisse. The French lost one man killed and five wounded; Polyphemus had one man killed.

On 17 April 1809, a British squadron captured the French 74-gun D'Hautpoul during Troude's expedition to the Caribbean. The initial distribution of prize money excluded Polyphemus and Tweed, who appealed. Polyphemus's appeal succeeded. (Note: A first-class share of the prize money was worth £40 9s 1d; a sixth-class share, that of an ordinary seaman, was worth 6s 3d.) On 28 April Polyphemus recaptured Carlotta, Duncan, master, and sent her into Jamaica. Carlotta had been sailing from St Batholomew's to Jacmel when a French privateer captured her.

In June 1809 Cumby received command of a squadron consisting of Polyphemus, Aurora, Tweed, Sparrow, Thrush, Griffon, Lark, Moselle, Fleur de la Mer, and Pike. They sailed from Port Royal on 7 June with troops under Major-General Hugh Lyle Carmichael to assist the Spanish forces besieging the French in the city of San Domingo.

On 1 July Polyphemus anchored at Caleta and loaded eight of her 24-pounder guns into Sparrow for landing at Palenqui for the use of the batteries west of the city. Captain Burt of Sparrow then transported two of the guns from Andre Bay to the east battery, nearly 30 miles across almost impassable country. The French garrison surrendered on 6 July. Cumby signed the terms of capitulation in his capacity as senior officer in command of "His Majesty's Ships and Vessels before the City of Santo Domingo." One payment of prize money occurred in October 1832. (Note: A first-class share was worth £67 3s 5d; a sixth-class share was worth £1 1s 3d.)

Captain Cumby was appointed to Hyperion in March 1811. His successor on Polyphemus was Captain T. Graves; Captain Douglas later replaced Graves. Under Douglas's command, Polyphemus recaptured Diana and Fame on 13 and 14 September.

In August 1812 Polyphemus and Barbadoes escorted a fleet of 47 merchant vessels sailing from Jamaica to London. On the 20th, the US revenue cutter James Madison started shadowing the fleet as the fleet sailed some distance off Savannah, Georgia, seeking to capture what she could. Two days later, Barbadoes succeeded in capturing James Madison after a seven-hour chase.

The British immediately fitted out James Madison for the protection of the fleet. They put two officers and 40 men on board, drawn from Barbadoes, and those men of James Madison's existing crew that were willing to change sides. On 26 August a hurricane came up that scattered the vessels of the convoy. It also totally dis-masted Barbadoes, which limped back to Jamaica, and sprung Polyphemus's main and foremasts. James Madison was able to regather 21 vessels of the convoy. On 3 September an American privateer schooner of 14 guns started shadowing James Madison and the vessels she was escorting. During the subsequent four days the privateer stayed close enough to exchange occasional shots with James Madison, but did not succeed in capturing anything. On 3 October Polyphemus and James Madison arrived separately at Portsmouth. Prize money for the capture was payable in March 1815.

In October Polyphemus detained the American vessel Amazon, from Philadelphia, and sent her into Portsmouth. Amazon arrived there on 4 October.

== Fate ==
Polyphemus paid off at Chatham in November 1812. In 1813 she was converted to serve as a powder hulk, and she was eventually broken up in 1827.

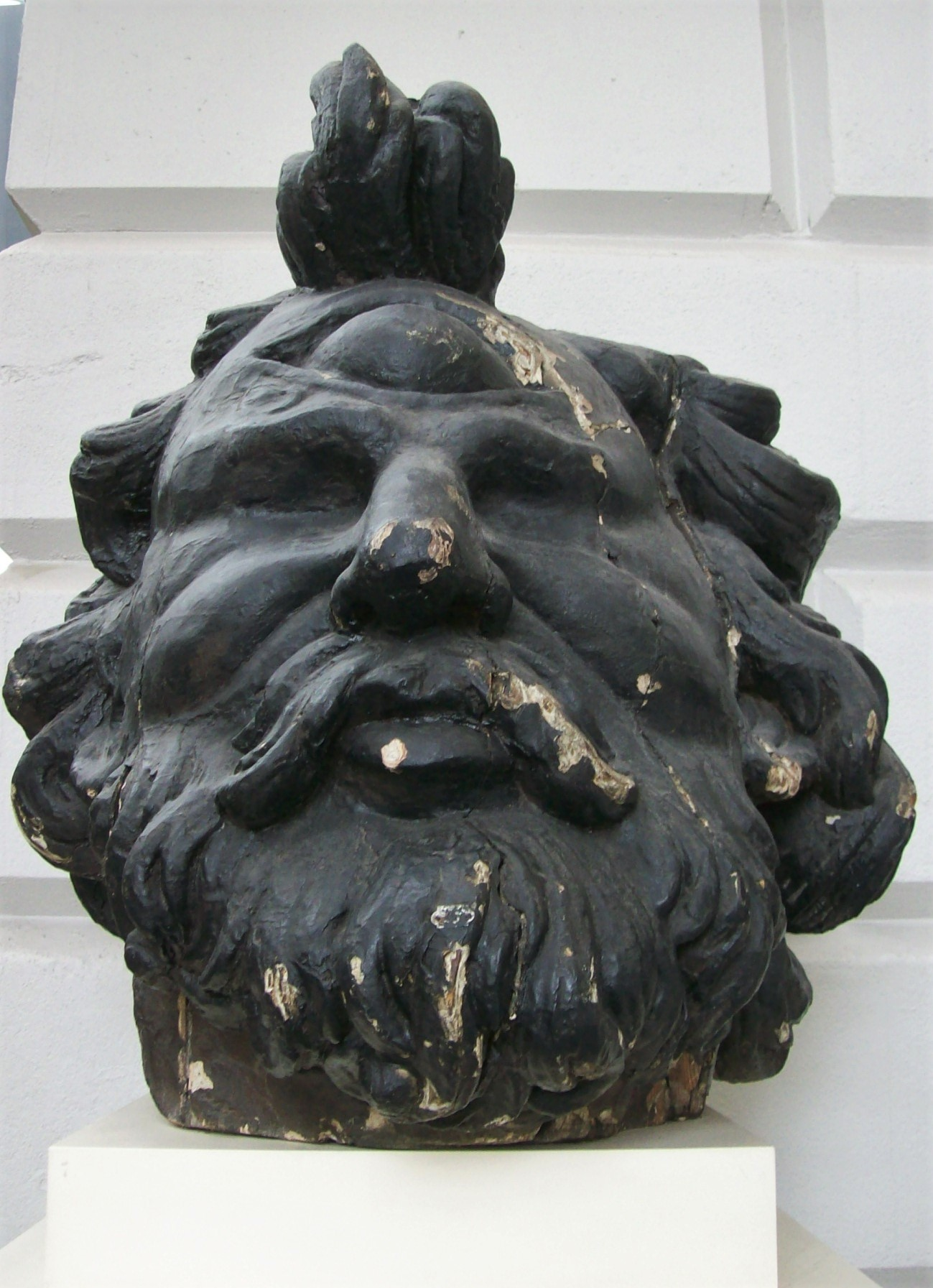
A figurehead of Polyphemus
