= HMS Rapide =

History

France
- Name: Villaret
- Namesake: Louis Thomas Villaret de Joyeuse, Captain-General of Martinique
- Acquired: 3 July 1806 by capture
- Renamed: Rapide (November 1807); Mouche No.1 (May 1808)
- Captured: 12 July 1808

United Kingdom
- Name: HMS Rapide
- Acquired: 12 July 1808 by capture
- Fate: Lost March 1814

General characteristics
- Displacement: 38 tons (French, unladen) & 70 tons laden
- Length: 57 ft 10 in (17.6 m)
- Beam: 15 ft 9 in (4.8 m)
- Depth of hold: 5 ft 10 in (1.8 m)
- Complement: 35-38
- Armament: 1806: 1 × 6-pounder gun + 2 × 12-pounder carronades; 1807: 1 × 6-pounder gun

HMS Rapide was a British schooner of unknown name that the French captured in 1806. The French Navy took her into service as Villaret, but renamed her Rapide. She then became the model for a class of advice boats (avisos). The British Royal Navy captured her in 1808 in the West Indies and took her into service as the ship's tender Rapide. She was lost in 1814.

== French aviso ==
French records give Rapide's origins as a British schooner that Admiral Willaumez's squadron captured on 3 July 1806, probably near Nevis, during his Atlantic campaign of 1806. The French records mis-identify the schooner and her name remains a mystery.

The French took the schooner into service as Villaret and she served in the Antilles until she sailed to Bayonne in July 1807. She was renamed Rapide on 4 November, but then taken out of commission from 11 November to 14 May 1808 while her lines were being taken. (Note: The ship designer Jean Baudry used her as the model for the first six of the Mouche No. 2-class schooner-avisos.) Rapide was renamed Mouche No.1 on 16 May 1808 when the Navy ordered six more vessels (Mouche Nos.2–7) built to her lines.

On 21 May Rapide sailed from Bayonne for Cayenne and Vera Cruz.

== Capture ==
Admiral Lord Collingwood received intelligence that the French corvette Rapide was on her way from Bayonne with dispatches and he asked Admiral Lord Alexander Cochrane to attempt to intercept her. On 12 July Belette captured Rapide, of one gun and 22 men, and took her into Barbados. Rapide was sailing from Bayonne and Cayenne to Martinique with dispatches.

However, Rapide's captain had managed to throw the dispatches overboard before Belette captured her. (Note: A first-class share of the prize money was worth £13 9s 0d; a sixth-class share was worth 5s 6¾d.) On 23 July duplicates of the dispatches and much besides were found concealed aboard the cartel Phoenix, which had sailed from Cayenne and had stopped in Barbados. She had aroused suspicion, leading Cochrane to having her searched. Because carrying these documents was a violation of the cartel (truce) flag, the British seized Phoenix and sent the seized documents in Subtle.

== Royal Navy ==
The Royal Navy took Rapide into service as a ship's tender, though it is not clear for what vessel she was a tender.

On 2 February 1810 Rapide, Lieutenant William Mather, commander, recaptured the brig Mary. The gun-vessel HMS Dapper, Lieutenant Henry Harford, commander, was in sight.

In 1813 Lieutenant William Mather received a promotion to Commander and command of HMS Tweed. Tweed was wrecked, with heavy loss of life, in November.

== Fate ==
Rapide was reported to have been wrecked in the Saintes in March 1814.
