= Torbay, Western Australia =

Town in the City of Albany, Western Australia

Torbay
- Town
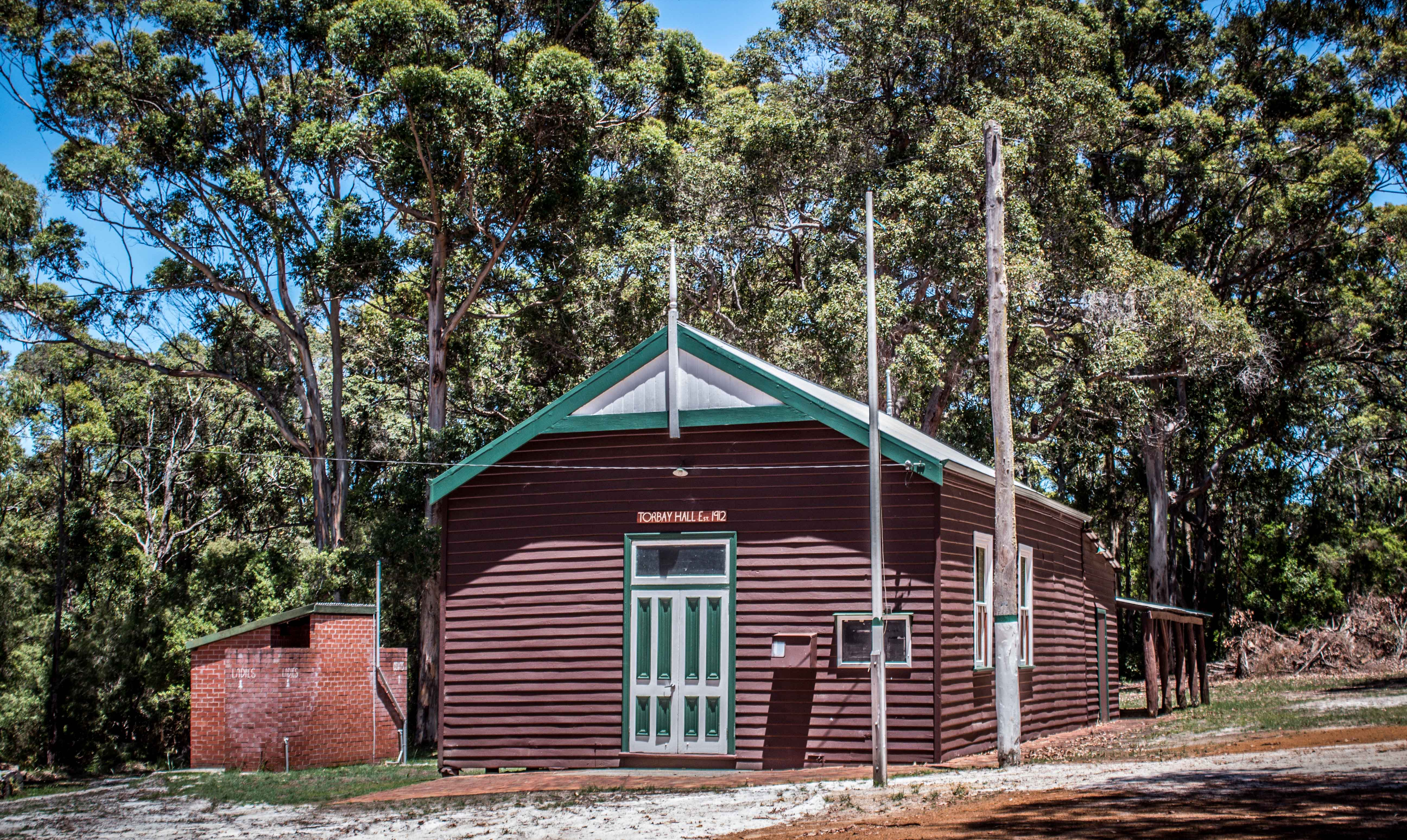
- Torbay Agricultural Hall, opened 25 July 1912

- Interactive map of Torbay
- Coordinates: 35°01′00″S 117°38′00″E
- Country: Australia
- State: Western Australia
- LGA: Albany
- Location: 430 km (270 mi) SSE of Perth; 20 km (12 mi) W of Albany
- Established: 1889

Government
  - State electorate: Albany
  - Federal division: O'Connor

Area
  - Total: 21.5 km^{2} (8.3 sq mi)
- Elevation: 69 m (226 ft)

Population
  - Total: 378 (SAL 2021)
- Postcode: 6330

Torbay is a small town and a bay in the Great Southern region of Western Australia, 20 kilometres (12 mi) west of Albany. Torbay is within the City of Albany local government area. The Torbay townsite was gazetted in 1910.

The Torbay area is on the eastern fringe of the karri forest region, and with some notable blocks of remnant tall forest. Large granite outcrops are also common. Beaches on the bay tend towards fine white sand. Where streams occur, they are clear but stained dark brown in colour from high-tannin-content vegetation.

Children in the area usually attend schools in Albany, travelling there by school bus. There is also a local independent school, the Woodbury Boston Primary School.

== History ==
The town is named after Tor Bay, a bay on the coast to the south originally named by Captain Matthew Flinders in 1801 after Tor Bay in Devon, the home port of Admiral Richard Howe's Channel Fleet, for whom Flinders had served as a midshipman from 1793 to 1794. Admiral Howe's nickname was "Lord Torbay". Flinders identified a number of local features with Lord Howe-related names, including Torbay (the bay), Torbay Inlet, Torbay Head and West Cape Howe (originally named Cape Howe by George Vancouver), to avoid confusion with James Cook’s Cape Howe in New South Wales. Pre-settlement explorers of the Torbay area included: Matthew Flinders, Robert Brown, Ferdinand Bauer and William Westall (Dec. 1801); Thomas Wilson (Dec. 1829); Roe and Stirling (Nov. 1835); and Charles Codrington Forsyth of HMS Pelorus (1838).

=== Shipbuilding ===
In November 1835, Roe and Stirling explored the Tor Bay area, scoping the area for shipbuilding. From the late 1830s to the 1860s an industry building vessels of up to 150 tons was established at Port Harding (Migo Island), using timber from the Guarinup Hills, half a mile behind the beach.

=== Whaling ===
A shore whaling station was established on the beach at Tor Bay behind Migo Island in 1844. Whales were taken during the periods 1844-1846 and 1861-1864.

=== Forestry ===
In 1886 railway contractors C & E Millar established sawmills at Bornholm to supply timber for the construction of the Great Southern Railway (Beverley to Albany railway). Timber was initially shipped out by lighter, schooner and the small steamer Active from Port Harding (Migo Island) to Albany, and later by tramline to Elleker. In 1889 the Torbay Estate, of 22,000 acres, was granted to Millars in consideration of extending the railway from Elleker to Torbay and establishing working sawmills there. The two Bornholm mills were shifted to Torbay and enlarged. A prosperous timber settlement was in evidence at Torbay for about six years. The estate concession extended from Wilgie Hill, at the Albany end of Torbay, to Youngs, the timber being hauled by tramline from 20 miles beyond Torbay as far as Hay River, before the mills were finally moved. By 1895 most of the suitable timber at Torbay had been felled. The railway was again extended to Denmark in 1896. In 1898 Millars Karri and Jarrah Forests Limited offered the Torbay Estate back to the government provided they could retain ownership of the strip of land occupied by the Elleker-Torbay railway, which under their contract was to revert to the government after 14 years. The land was subdivided and sold for agricultural purposes in 1900.

=== WAGR rail service ===
Millars' Elleker-Torbay-Denmark railway line closed on 31 May 1905. During negotiations over the sale of the railway line the State leased the line and WAGR rail services began on 3 May 1907. In 1908 Millars sold the railway to the state government. Line extension works beyond Denmark were started in 1926 and on 11 June 1929 the first passenger service ran to Nornalup. The Nornalup-Denmark-Torbay-Elleker rail service was permanently shut down on 30 September 1957 and the rails were lifted in 1963. On early operational lists of stopping places of the line, there are two identified locations, one as Torbay Junction, the other being Torbay.

- Torbay was the station and siding built in 1889, on the Denmark line - at 335m 58c and closed in 1957.
- Torbay Junction was opened in 1897, as Lakeside, on the Great Southern line at 330m 46c, it was then named Torbay Junction in 1908, and was further renamed Elleker in 1921.

== Modern industry ==
Local industries include dairy farming, beef cattle, plantation forestry, specialist horticulture, arts and crafts and tourism, along with rural businesses that service farmers (mechanics, lime supply, machinery and labour hire etc.). A seasonal commercial fishing industry occurs within the bay based on catches of herring and Australian salmon during the February–April period. Torbay has been a traditional potato growing area for over a century, particularly for seed potato production. While some pumpkins are grown and the area is suitable for cauliflower production, potatoes are the major horticultural crop. The area currently produces about 50% of Western Australia’s requirements for seed potato production.

== Tor Bay ==
Tor Bay, which includes Port Harding (named in 1838 by master's mate Charles Forsyth after Captain Francis Harding of HMS Pelorus) and Port Hughes (named in 1831 by Roe after Private Thomas Hughes of the 63rd Regiment) as well as Torbay Inlet, lie between Torbay Head and Stony Island. Torbay Head is the most southerly point on the mainland of Western Australia and the most western point of the Great Australian Bight. Islands within Tor Bay include Migo Island, named after the Swan River native Migo, Richard Island, named after Admiral Richard Howe, both by Roe in 1835; and Shelter Island.

Popular beaches on the bay include Perkins Beach, Muttonbird Beach and Cosy Corner, all accessible by car. Cosy Corner Beach is the most well-known, and is a popular family beach with picnic and camping facilities. Children's swimming lessons are held there in the summer. There are other beaches that are accessible only by four-wheel drive vehicle. The Bibbulmun Track passes around the edge of the bay, coming down long steps from the steep hills above Cosy Corner and following the beach around the curve of the bay and across the mouth of Torbay Inlet along Muttonbird Beach to near Shelter Island.

== Mars ==
A 6.33 kilometres (3.93 mi) diameter impact crater on the planet Mars was in 1988 named after Torbay.

== Gallery ==
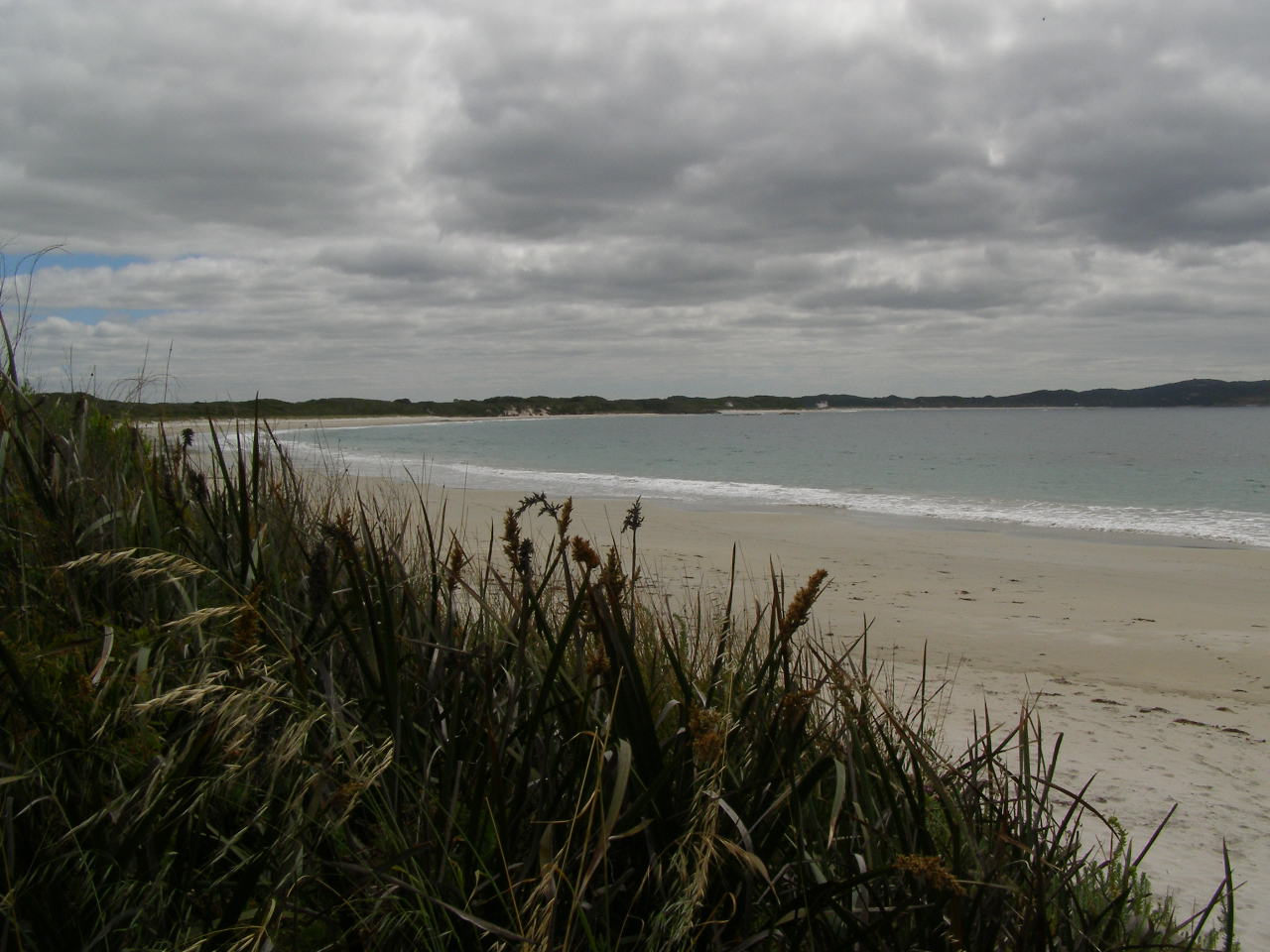
Cosy Corner beach, Torbay

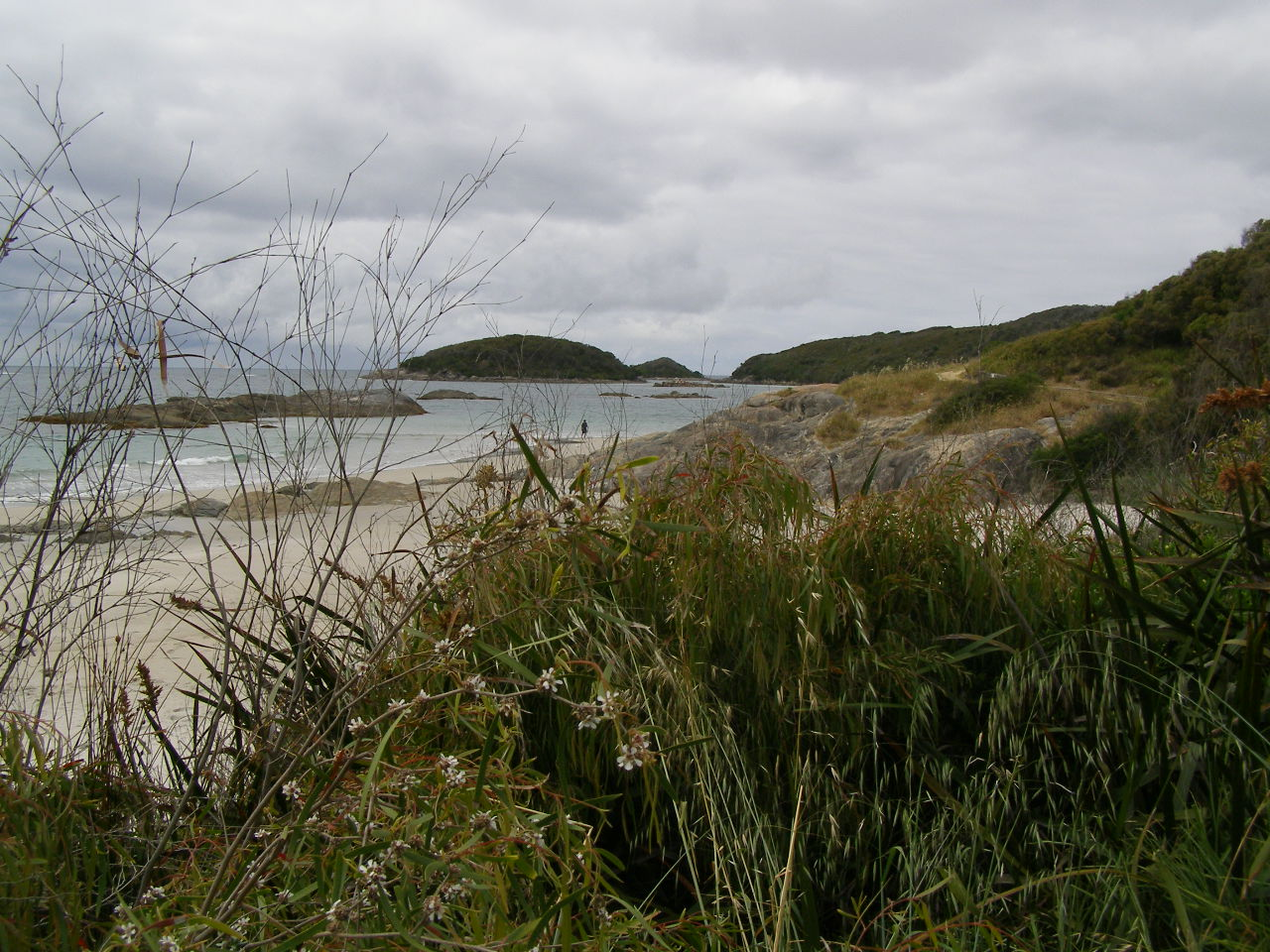
Cosy Corner beach, Torbay

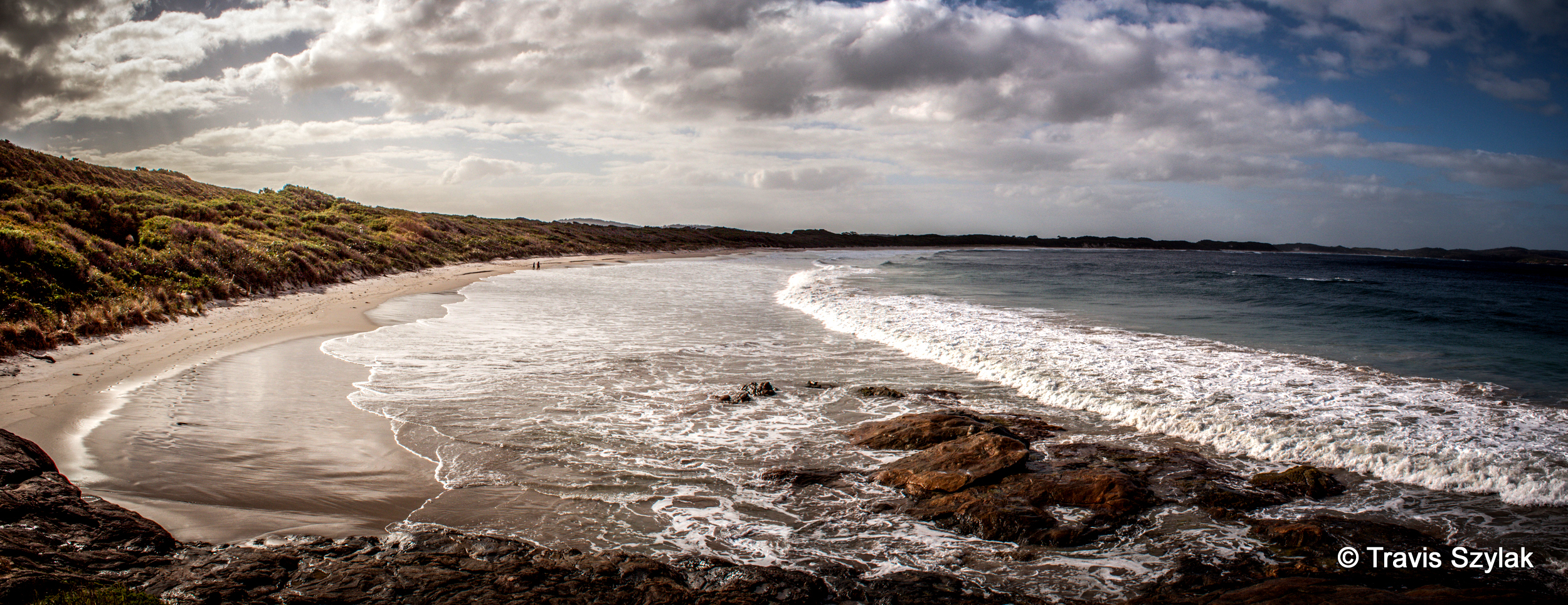
Cosy Corner beach, Torbay
