= Traveller (1804 ship) =

French prize ship

History

United Kingdom
- Name: Traveller
- Acquired: circa 1804 by purchase of a prize
- Fate: Last listed 1813

General characteristics
- Tons burthen: 117, or 118 (bm)

Traveller was a French prize that entered British records in 1804. She initially traded between Plymouth and Italy and then from 1805 made two voyages as whaler in the British southern whale fishery. Although the registers continued to list her as whaling after 1806 until 1813, she does not appear during this period in Lloyd's List's ship arrival and departure data.

== Career ==
Traveller first entered the Register of Shipping in 1804 (RS), and Lloyd's Register (LR) in 1805.

On 2 March 1804, Traveler, Vavasor, master, arrived at Gibraltar from Plymouth. On 3 November she arrived at Plymouth from Leghorn.

Year	Master	Owner	Trade	Source & source
1804	Vavasor	T.Lockyer	Plymouth–Venice	RS
1805	G.Davey	T.Lockyer	Cowes–Guernsey	LR
1805	Vavasor	T.Lockyer	Plymouth–Venice	RS

On 15 October 1805 Travellor, Vavasor, master, sailed from Gravesend, bound for the South Seas.

Towards the end of 1805, HMS Lark was escorting six merchantmen from Gorée, including the whalers Atlantic and Traveller, when at 30°N 17°W by the Savage Islands she came upon the Rochefort squadron consisting of five sail of the line, three frigates, a razée, and two brig-corvettes. The British vessels dispersed and Lark, Traveller, and four of the merchantmen escaped. At the time it was not clear what had happened to Atlantic.

Year	Master	Owner	Trade	Source & source
1806	Vavasor	Dartnell &Co.	London-Southern Fishery	RS
1806	G.Davey	T.Lockyer	Cowes–Guernsey	LR
1806	Vavasor; T.Bosser	Lockyer & Co.	London–South Seas	LR
1807	Bosser	Dartnell & Co.	London–South Seas	LR

Traveller, Rosser, master, was next reported to have sailed on 7 November 1806 from Deal, bound for the South Seas. She was next reported to have been at Madeira in November while on her way to the fishery. This was the last report in Lloyd's List of the arrival or departure of Traveller, Rosser (or Bosser), master. A Traveller was reported to have sailed from Madeira to Rio de Janeiro, from Madeira. Traveller was then reported to have arrived at Saint Helena on 15 May 1807, and to have sailed on 22 May for the coast of Africa.
