= Atlantic (1805 ship) =

History

United Kingdom
- Name: Atlantic
- Owner: Samuel Enderby & Sons
- Launched: Calcutta
- Acquired: 1805 by purchase of a prize
- Fate: Lost late 1807
- Notes: Teak-built

General characteristics
- Tons burthen: 222, or 223 (bm)
- Armament: 2 × 3-pounder guns

Atlantic was launched at Calcutta, under another name and returned to British ownership as a prize taken from the French in 1805. She made one complete voyage for Samuel Enderby & Sons as a whaler in the British southern whale fishery. She was lost late in 1807, perhaps while setting out on a second whaling voyage.

== Career ==
Atlantic first appeared in Lloyd's Register (LR) in 1805.

Year	Master	Owner	Trade	Source
1805	Swaine	Enderby	London–South Seas	LR

Atalante, Swain, master, sailed from Portsmouth on 28 October 1805.

Towards the end of 1805, HMS Lark was escorting six merchantmen from Gorée, including the whalers Atlantic and Traveller, when at 30°N 17°W by the Savage Islands she came upon the Rochefort squadron consisting of five sail of the line, three frigates, a razée, and two brig-corvettes. The British vessels dispersed and Lark, Traveller, and four of the merchantmen escaped. Traveller was among the vessels that escaped, but at the time, it was not clear what had happened to Atlantic.

On 3 May 1806 Atlantic, Swain, master, arrived at Port Jackson. She was reported to have come from England, with oil, which suggests that she had already gathered some whale oil before she arrived. She departed for the fisheries on 29 July. She apparently returned to Port Jackson on 7 November with 750 barrels of whale oil.

Atlantic, Swaine, master, returned to England on 8 September 1807. She returned via St Helena, in a convoy escorted by HMS Antelope.

== Fate ==
Reportedly, Atlantic, David Kell, master, was lost in late 1807. She had sailed for the South Seas on 12 September 1807.
