= HMS Garland (1807) =

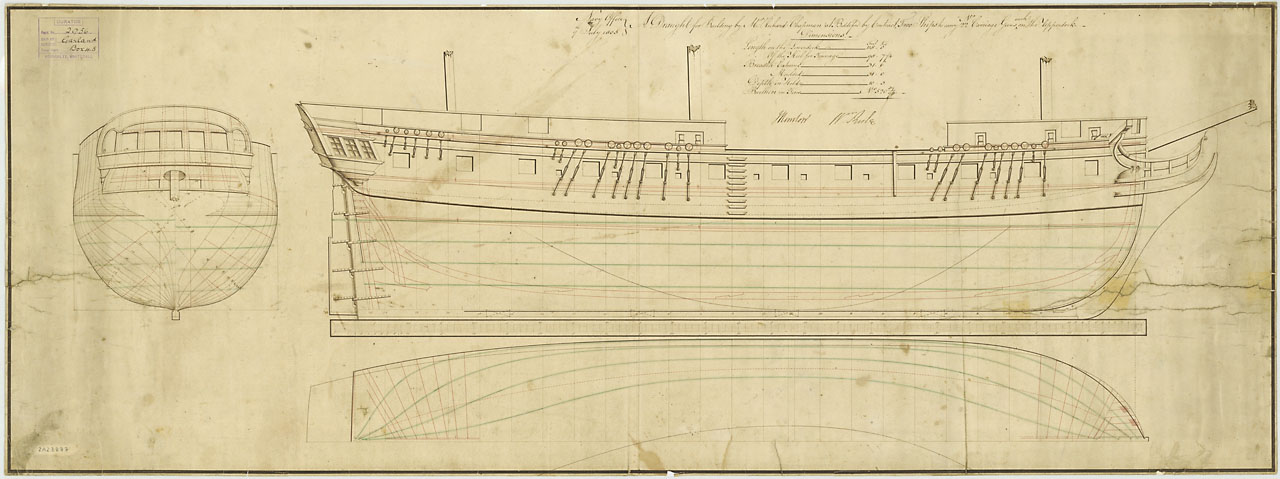
- Garland

History

United Kingdom
- Name: HMS Garland
- Ordered: 30 January 1805
- Builder: Richard Chapman, Bideford
- Laid down: August 1805
- Launched: 25 April 1807
- Completed: 8 September 1807 at Plymouth Dockyard
- Commissioned: March 1807
- Fate: Sold 9 May 1817

General characteristics
- Class & type: Laurel-class post ship
- Tons burthen: 52626/94(bm)
- Length: Overall:118 ft 1 1/2 in (36.005 m); Keel:98 ft 8 in (30.07 m)
- Beam: 31 ft 8 in (9.65 m)
- Depth of hold: 10 ft 3 1/8 in (3.127 m)
- Sail plan: Full-rigged ship
- Complement: 155
- Armament: Upper deck: 22 × 32-pounder carronades; QD: 6 × 24-pounder carronades; Fc: 2 × 6-pounder guns & 2 × 24-pounder carronades

HMS Garland was a 22-gun Royal Navy Laurel-class post ship. She was built by Richard Chapman at Bideford and launched on 5 May 1807. She saw action in the War of 1812 and was sold in 1817.

== Career ==
Garland was commissioned in March 1807 under Captain Header Whittier. On 11 November 1807 she sailed to the West Indies. She served under a number of captains there, including Rowland Bevan (1808), Thomas Thrush (1 May - August 1809), William Charlton (died 7 August 1810), William Henry Shirreff (18 November 1809 – 1811), Thomas Graves, and Thomas Huskisson (May 1811 to June 1812). Captain Richard Plummer Davies received promotion to post-captain on 19 June 1812 and then took command of Garland.

=== Prize taking ===
On 28 July 1812, Garland recaptured Hassan, which was sailing to Havannah with a cargo of sundries. Five days later, Garland captured Superb, which was sailing to Boston in ballast. That same day, 2 August, Garland captured Dal, which was sailing to Newhaven with rum and sugar, and Madisonia, sailing to Alexandria with sugar and hides. (Note: Prize money for Dal was paid in 1816. Davies received £126 12s 8d; an ordinary seaman received £2 2s 10½d. For Superb, Davies received £22 9s 9d in prize money; an ordinary seaman received 8s 7½d.)

On 13 September 1812 Garland's boats captured the American privateer Poor Sailor. Poor Sailor was armed with one long 6-pounder gun and had a crew of 15 men. Then on 4 December Garland captured the brig San Pedro, which was sailing from New Orleans to St. Domingo.

=== Mediterranean ===
In 1814 Garland was off the north coast of Spain, still under Davies. In 1815, following Napoleon's escape from Elba, the Admiralty sent Garland and Undaunted to the Adriatic Sea, under the orders of Captain Charles Austen, brother of the novelist Jane Austen, in Phoenix. Austen's mission was to co-operate with the Austrians and to intercept some Neapolitan warships. Phoenix and Garland watched two large frigates at Brindisi, while Undaunted cruised northwards along the coast. After the surrender of Naples, following the military convention of Casalanza, Austen persuaded the captains of the two Neapolitan frigates to switch their allegiance to the restored monarch, Ferdinand IV of Naples.

Next, Phoenix, Aquilon, Garland and Reynard sailed to the Greek Archipelago to look for a French squadron comprising the frigate Junon, the 32-gun corvette Victorieuse, two brigs, and two schooners. The British objective was to prevent the French squadron capturing merchant vessels traversing the area and to suppress piracy. However, it turned out that the French had left the area; shortly afterwards peace was restored.

== Fate ==
In 1816 Garland was out of commission at Deptford. Garland was finally sold on 9 May 1817 to a Mr Hill for £1,500.
