= Laurel-class post ship =

Class overview
- Name: Laurel-class post ships
- Operators: Royal Navy
- Completed: 6

General characteristics
- Type: Sixth-rate post ship
- Tons burthen: 526 39/94 (bm; as designed)
- Length: 118 ft (36 m) (gundeck); 98 ft 7 1/4 in (30.055 m) (keel)
- Beam: 31 ft 6 in (9.60 m)
- Depth: 10 ft 3 in (3.12 m)
- Sail plan: Full-rigged ship
- Complement: 155 (later raised to 175).
- Armament: As ordered : UD: 22 × 9-pounder guns (later replaced by 22 × 32-pounder carronades; QD: 6 × 24-pounder carronades; Fc: 2 × 6-pounder guns + 2 × 24-pounder carronades

The Laurel-class sailing sixth rates were a series of six post ships built to an 1805 design by Sir John Henslow. The first three were launched in 1806, two more in 1807, and the last in 1812. The vessels of the class served in the Royal Navy during the Napoleonic War.

== Ships in class ==
- HMS Boreas
- HMS Laurel
  - Builder: Nicholas Bools & William Good, Bridport, Dorset
  - Ordered: 30 January 1805
  - Laid down: June 1805
  - Launched: 2 June 1806
  - Completed: 16 November 1806 at Plymouth Dockyard
  - Fate: Captured by the French on 12 September 1808. The French named her Esperance. Unicorn recaptured her on 12 April 1810 off the Île de Ré. She was armed en flute and was carrying a cargo of colonial produce from Île de France while under the command of a lieutenant de vaisseau. The Royal Navy took her back into service as HMS Laurestinus. She wrecked in the Bahamas in August 1813.
- HMS Comus
- HMS Garland
- HMS Perseus
- HMS Volage
