= HMS Pelorus (1808) =

Brig-sloop of the Royal Navy

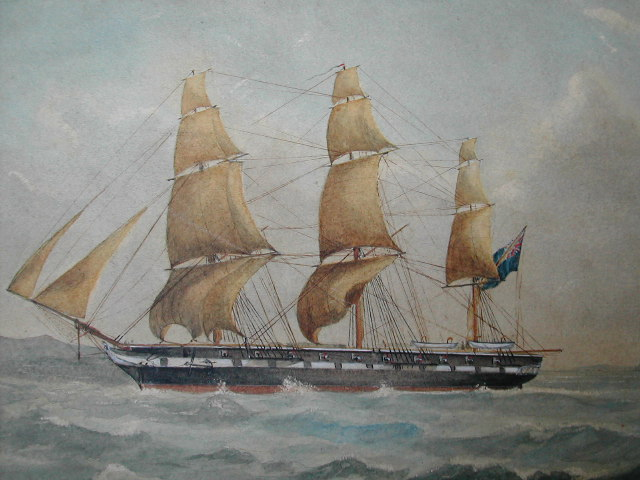
- HMS Pelorus, as a ship-sloop, ca. 1830

History

United Kingdom
- Name: HMS Pelorus
- Builder: Itchenor, England
- Launched: 25 June 1808
- Honours and awards: Naval General Service Medal with clasps: "Martinique"; "Guadaloupe"
- Fate: Wrecked, 25 November 1839; refloated; Sold, 1842; Wrecked, 25 December 1844

General characteristics
- Class & type: Cruizer-class brig-sloop
- Tons burthen: 38460/94(bm)
- Length: 100 ft (30.5 m) (overall); 77 ft 3 3/4 in (23.6 m) (keel)
- Beam: 30 ft 6 in (9.3 m)
- Depth of hold: 12 ft 9 in (3.9 m)
- Complement: 121
- Armament: 16 × 32-pounder carronades; 2 × 6-pounder guns

HMS Pelorus was an 18-gun Cruizer-class brig-sloop of the British Royal Navy. She was built in Itchenor, England and launched on 25 June 1808. She saw action in the Napoleonic Wars and in the War of 1812. On anti-slavery patrol off West Africa, she captured four slavers and freed some 1350 slaves. She charted parts of Australia and New Zealand and participated in the First Opium War (1839–1842) before becoming a merchantman and wrecking in 1844 while transporting opium to China.

== Napoleonic Wars ==
Pelorus was commissioned in July 1808 under Commander the Honourable James William King, and sailed for the Leeward Islands on 15 December. In January 1809 Commander Thomas Huskisson was appointed commander of Pelorus, but did not find out until May. Therefore, he was not her commander at the capture of Martinique in February. (Some accounts have her under the command of Captain Francis Augustus Collier; however, he was commander of Starr.) Under Huskisson she then took part in enforcing the blockade of Guadeloupe. In 1847 the Admiralty awarded the Naval General Service Medal with clasp "Martinique" to any surviving crewmen from that campaign who wished to claim it.

On 16 October Pelorus and Hazard were in company when they came upon the French privateer schooner Général Ernouf, moored under the guns of the battery of St. Marie on the east coast of the southern part of Guadeloupe. Hazard and Pelorus attempted to send in a cutting out party during the night, but the boats could not find a channel. The British went in again in the daylight despite fire from the battery and the schooner's long 18-pounder pivot-gun and two swivels. Fire from Hazard and Pelorus silenced the batteries but as the British came alongside the French crew, an estimated 80–100 men, fled ashore. There two field guns joined them in firing on the cutting-out party. Because the schooner was aground and chained to the shore the boarding party could not bring her out; instead, they set fire to her. However, a premature explosion injured some of them. In all, Hazard lost three men killed and four wounded; Pelorus lost three killed and five wounded.

In February 1810 Pelorus participated in the capture of Guadeloupe. In 1847 the Admiralty awarded the Naval General Service Medal with clasp "Guadaloupe" to any surviving crewmen from that campaign who wished to claim them. Later the same year, under Commander Alexander Kennedy, Pelorus patrolled the Leeward Islands. In May, command transferred to Commander Joshua Rowley. In late December 1811 and early 1812, Pelorus was cruising off Plymouth. On 22 and 23 December 1811 she captured Marianne and Deux Freres. On 6 January 1812, she sent in a French chasse maree that she had taken. On 5 April Rowley sailed her for the Mediterranean. In September 1812, Commander Robert Gambier took command of Pelorus.

By 1814, her captain was Commander Robert Stow. On 7 March boats from Endymion, Rattler, and a third British vessel, destroyed the American privateer Mars, of 15 guns and 70 men, off Sandy Hook. Some accounts name Pelorus as the third British vessel, but the prize money notices and most other accounts give the name of the third vessel as Belvidera. Then by September, Pelorus was under the command of Commander John Gourly. A year later she was paid off at Plymouth where she underwent a Middling Repair before she was laid up.

== Return to service ==
She was fitted for sea from April–August 1823, Commander William Hamley having recommissioned her in April. In 1824, she was at Cork on coast guard duties. On 19 May she captured the smuggling vessel Good Hope. On 9 October, she captured the small smuggling lugger Phoenix, which was carrying a cargo of tobacco and a small amount of tea. Over a period of three years, Hamley captured more smuggling-vessels than any other vessel. On 30 October 1823, a ship ran into Pelorus during the night, and then sailed on. The crash destroyed the bowsprit and sent the foremast over the side; both had to be cut away despite the heavy seas and otherwise bad weather. The crew rigged a jury-mast and bowsprit and Pelorus was able to get back to Plymouth. Had the ship struck Pelorus a few inches further aft the sloop would almost certainly have foundered.

Pelorus was paid off in July 1826. In all, Hamley had seized more than 62,000 weight of tobacco.

From July–October 1826, she underwent alteration from a brig-sloop to a ship-sloop via the addition of a third mast.

=== Mediterranean ===
Then in October, Commander Peter Richards recommissioned her. In January 1827, Pelorus was employed in the Mediterranean protecting British trade in the Archipelago, at Alexandria, and around the coasts of Syria and Caramania. Commander Michael Quinn took command from September 1828. On 21 December 1829, she struck a rock at the entrance of Port Mahon, Menorca, Spain; she was refloated on 23 December 1829, but subsequently sank. Isis came from Gibraltar to retrieve her officers and crew. Pelorus was refloated, and by 9 May 1830 she was back in Portsmouth. From December 1830 to December 1831, she underwent repairs and an alteration back to a brig.

=== Anti-slavery ===
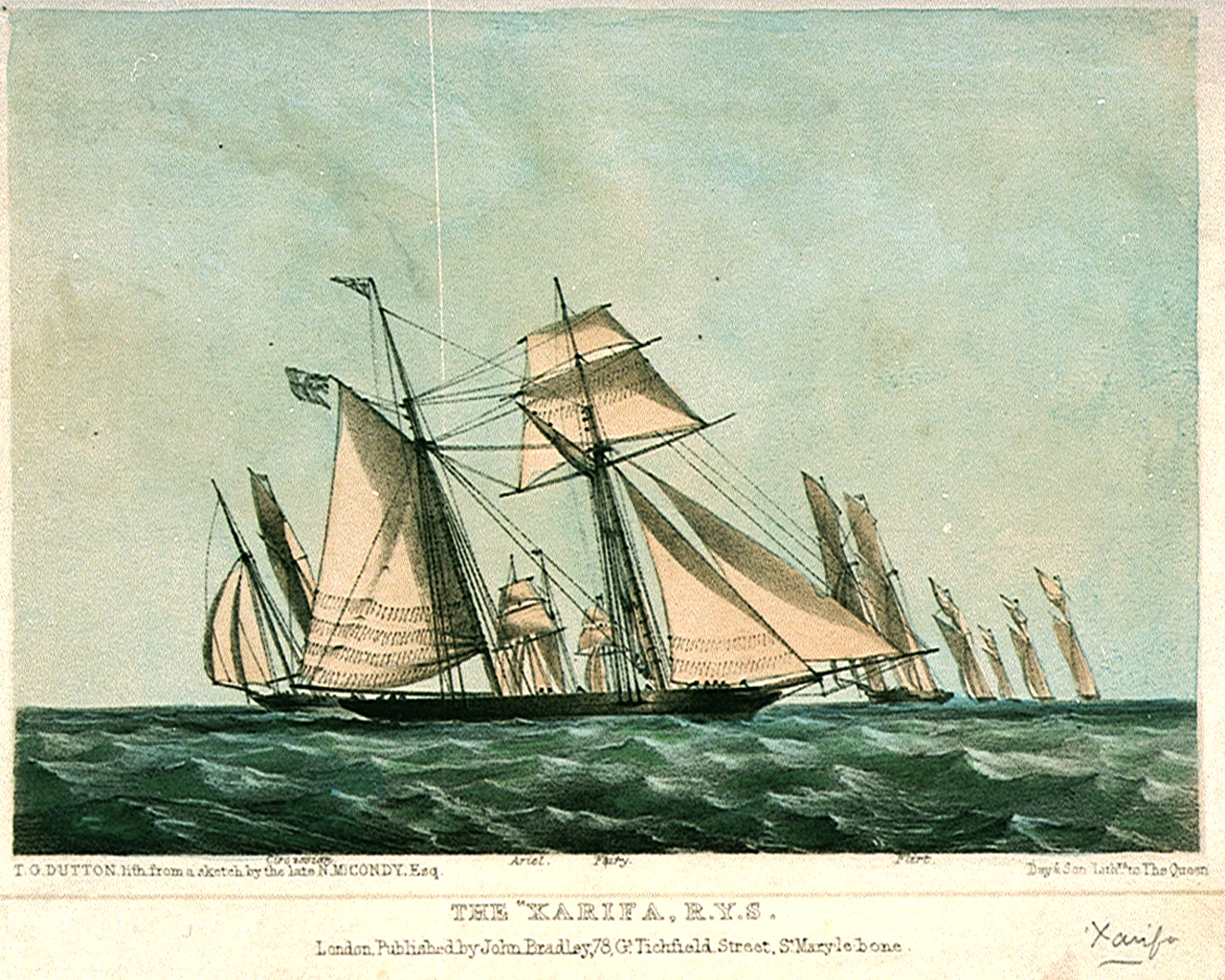
Yacht Xarifa, ex-Segunda Theresa, 1835, by Thomas Goldsworthy Dutton, after a sketch by Nicholas Matthew Condy, National Maritime Museum, Greenwich

In 1831, William Wilberforce's anti-slavery law was passed. In September, Captain Richard Meredith recommissioned Pelorus and she joined the West Africa Squadron. Here she patrolled the west coast of Africa to suppress the slave trade. On 9 May 1832, she was at Sierra Leone having brought in the Spanish slaving vessel Segunda Theresa, which was carrying 459 slaves. (Note: Segunda Theresa had been built in 1831 at Philadelphia and was flying the Spanish flag when Pelorus captured her. She was sold and became the yacht Xariffa.)

On 18 October 1832 Pelorus sailed from the Cape of Good Hope for Simon's Bay. In May 1833 she was back at the Cape, and on the 16th she sailed for Mauritius. She arrived there on 3 June. A month later, on 6 June, she left Mauritius for Colombo with specie to pay the troops in Ceylon. From there she returned to the Cape, from whence she sailed for St Helena, where she arrived on 7 December. She then sailed to Ascension and the west coast of Africa.

On 16 June 1834, Lieutenant Philip de Sausmarez of Pelorus came before a court martial. The charge was that on 18 April 1832, while in command of the prize crew on the Segunda Theresa, Sausmarez had the boatswain's mate of Lynx administer 24 lashes to Francis Brown for neglect of duty. Meredith preferred the charges because he had forbidden the lash in written orders. The court supported Suasmarez, who had been under arrest for 18 months before his exoneration. (Note: On 18 June 1834, Sausmarez transferred to Caledonia. He stayed in the Navy and eventually made Captain while retired.)

On 30 June, boats from Pelorus captured the Spanish slaver Pepita. At the time of her capture, Pepita had no slaves aboard. Under the terms of the treaty with Spain, the Royal Navy could only seize vessels actually carrying slaves. The boarding party manufactured evidence by putting three slaves aboard Pepita after boarding her. They then brought another 176 slaves that were on shore waiting to be loaded. Meredith accepted responsibility for the manufacturing of evidence. The Court in Sierra Leone therefore had to order Pepita returned to her master. Pepita's master then sued for damages. The Court found against Meredith and charged him £1092 in damages

Pelorus continued to patrol the Bight of Benin and the vicinity of Princees Island.

On 17 December, Pelorus captured the two-gun slaver Sutil. She had 307 slaves aboard, of whom 91 died of dysentery and disease before they could be freed in Sierra Leone.

On 5 January 1835, boats from Pelorus captured the Spanish polacca-bark Minerva, which armed with two 18-pounder and two 8-pounder guns. The boats had sailed 60 mi (97 km) up the Calabar river and laid in ambush. Skillful handling resulted in the capture of the slaver with no casualties to the boarding party although the vessel's guns were double-shotted and the crew and the boarding party exchanged small arms fire. The vessel had a crew of 37 men, two of whom were cut down. (Note: One account has Minerva armed with 10 guns and carrying a crew of 65 men.) The boarding party consisted of 22 men. The slaver had some 650 slaves aboard, and after her capture, the master arrived with 25 more. In sum, she had 676 aboard, of whom 206 died of disease before they could be freed in Sierra Leone.

On 24 February 1835 she was off Princes Island where Midshipman Judd died.

On 26 September, Pelorous was paid off at Portsmouth. A bounty was paid on both Sutil and Minerva in June 1836.

=== Far East and Antipodes ===
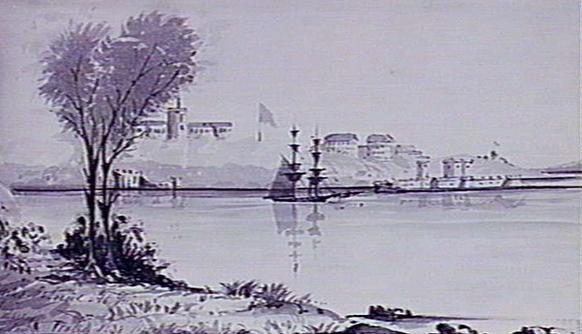
HMS Pelorus at Sydney on 16 June 1838

On 31 January 1837, Pelorus was recommissioned under Captain Francis Harding who had taken command on 21 January. She then sailed for the Cape of Good Hope on 9 April, having received specie from London that she was to take to Mauritius via the Cape. She arrived at the Cape on 1 June.

Pelorus — under Commander Harding — called at the Cocos (Keeling) Islands on 16 December, and stayed for six days. Captain John Clunies-Ross — the "King of the Cocos (Keeling) Islands" — had asked for a visit from a naval vessel to forestall a possible revolt by the inhabitants.

In mid-September 1837, Pelorus sailed to Rangoon to deliver an ultimatum to the mutinous King Tharyarwaddy from the Governor-General of India, Lord Auckland.

Next, she sailed for Western Australia and Van Diemen's Land. On 9 January 1838, she arrived at Fremantle from Calcutta, departing on 19 March for King George Sound carrying a party including Governor of Western Australia Captain James Stirling. While there a boatcrew, under master's mate Charles Forsyth, surveyed the nearby Tor Bay for a potential new anchorage. She returned Stirling to Fremantle, arriving on 9 April, then departing on 7 May for Adelaide, Launceston and Sydney, arriving on 22 June. On 5 July she sailed for New Zealand.

Then in August Pelorus sailed to New Zealand to conduct a survey of the Marlborough Sounds region. On 22 August, Pelorus sailed into Port Underwood, New Zealand, and cast anchor in Oyster Cove. She was under the temporary command of Lt. Phillip Chetwode while Commander Harding was ill. From here, Chetwode surveyed and named Pelorus River and Pelorus Sound / Te Hoiere in New Zealand in honour of his ship. He also named the Chetwode Islands, off Pelorus Sound.

Lieutenant Augustus Kuper was nominated acting commander of Pelorus on 27 July 1839. On 26 August, Pelorus and HMS Herald attempted to scuttle the British merchant ship Lucretia, which had caught fire off Kyardbilly's point, Sydney. The attempt was unsuccessful and the ship exploded and sank.

=== Wrecked at Port Essington, Coburg Peninsula, Northern Territory ===
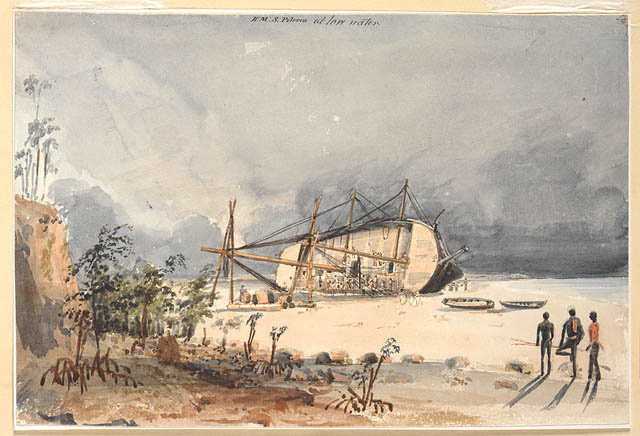
HMS Pelorus at low water, 1840, by Owen Stanley

On 25 November 1839, while anchored off Port Essington, Australia, a hurricane struck Pelorus, wrecking her. She lost 12 of her crew; a whaleboat from Britomart, under Captain Owen Stanley, rescued the survivors. According to Kuper, "Pelorus was buried 9 feet (2.7 m) in the mud for 86 days."

=== Opium War ===
On 5 March 1840, Kuper was promoted to command of Alligator, then on 26 December, Lieutenant Kuper was promoted to the rank of commander, his commission being back-dated to when he took command of Pelorus.

After repairs, in late July 1840, Pelorus sailed from Sydney with Herald to take part in the First Opium War. On 23 April 1841, she arrived at Singapore. One month later, Lieutenant W. W. Chambers, of Wellesley, was appointed and promoted to be acting commander of Pelorus. At the time, Wellesley was at Canton (now Guangzhou) in China.

== Disposal and final loss ==
On 6 July 1841, Pelorus was laid up at Singapore and Lieutenant Chambers returned to Britain. The officers and crew transferred to the steam paddle and sail survey cutter Bentinck, which Commodore Sir J.J.G. Bremer had just purchased and which went on to operations in China. An Admiralty Order of 16 October specified that Pelorus was to be sold, which took place in 1842.

The purchasers may have been Pybus Brothers. On 27 1843, under Captain Triggs, she arrived in Hong Kong with a load of opium.

Pelorus sank on 25 December 1844 when she struck a shoal at 8°8′30″N 115°30′0″E off the coast of Borneo in the South China Sea. Captain Triggs took her gig and two passengers and sailed 100 mi (160 km) to Singapore. From there he led the steamer Victoria to the wreck. Victoria was able to rescue 20 of the crew and save 70 chests of opium.

== Commanding officers ==
From	To	Captain
1808		Hon. J W King
18 January 1809		Thomas Huskisson
1811		A Kennedy
11 March 1812		R Rowley
September 1812		Robert Gambier
1814		Arthur Stow
9 September 1814	1815	John Gourly
1816		Laid up at Plymouth
23 April 1823		William Hamley
October 1826		Peter Richards
September 1828	May 1830	Michael Quin
1834	26 September 1935	Richard Meredith
21 January 1837		Francis Harding
27 July 1839	5 March 1840	Augustus Kuper
5 March 1840	22 May 1841	?
22 May 1841	6 July 1841	William Chambers
