= Spanish ship Monarca =

Spanish ship Monarca includes the following ships:

- Spanish ship Monarca (1756), a 68-gun ship of the line, captured by the Royal Navy and commissioned as HMS Monarca
- Spanish ship Monarca (1794), a 74-gun ship of the line
