= William Pryce Cumby =

Royal Navy officer

Captain William Pryce Cumby CB
- Born: 20 March 1771; Heighington, County Durham, England
- Died: 27 September 1837 (aged 66); Pembroke, Pembrokeshire, Wales
- Military career
- Allegiance: United Kingdom
- Branch: Royal Navy
- Service years: c.1779–1815
- Rank: Captain
- Commands: Swift; Bellerophon; Polyphemus; Hyperion; Royal Sovereign
- Conflicts: French Revolutionary Wars; Napoleonic Wars; Battle of Trafalgar
- Awards: Order of the Bath
- Other work: Superintendent of Pembroke Dockyard

Captain William Pryce Cumby CB (20 March 1771 – 27 September 1837) was an officer in the Royal Navy whose excellent service during the French Revolutionary and Napoleonic Wars was highlighted when he was thrust into the limelight following his service at the Battle of Trafalgar. During the battle the French almost took his vessel, the ship of the line Bellerophon. Despite mounting casualties, heavy bombardment and the death of John Cooke, the captain of Bellerophon, the then Lieutenant Cumby ably took command, leading a charge that cleared his decks of boarders. He then captured the enemy ship from which the attack had come. He later served in the Caribbean and on convoy duties in the Atlantic. At the time of his death, he was Superintendent of Pembroke Dockyard.

== Early life ==
William Pryce Cumby was born in Dover on 20 March 1771. He was the second son of Lieutenant David Pryce Cumby, a commander in the Royal Navy, and his first wife Eleanor. The daughter of William Jepson of Heighington, she died, aged 24 on 3 April, when William was a few weeks old. In 1801 he married Ann Metcalfe who bore him 7 children before her death in 1815, including the Reverend Anthony Cumby(1803-1881) whose daughter Elizabeth married Alexander Ewing(1830-1895)

== Career ==
Cumby first served on 20 May 1784, as servant to the lieutenant commanding the cutter, Kite. He was rated Able seaman, 15 February the following year and made lieutenant in the general promotions that followed the outbreak of war in 1794. He had little chance for distinction during the next eleven years, but maintained a solid reputation for good service and efficiency.

Pryce Cumby served as an officer aboard the frigate Astraea, and aboard the Thalia between 1795 and 1798. He was then appointed Flag Lieutenant to Vice-Admiral Alexander Graeme at the Nore, serving in this role until 1803, when he was given command of the sloop Swift in the North Sea. In 1804 he was appointed first lieutenant of the third rate Bellerophon ("Billy Ruffian" to her crew). Her commander, Captain John Cooke, and Cumby had an especially close professional relationship, so when the ship lined up in Admiral Collingwood's division on 21 October 1805 in the opening stages of the battle of Trafalgar, Cooke made the unusual move of taking Cumby and the ship's master Edward Overton into his confidence about the ship's orders and Admiral Nelson's confidential instructions; in case something should happen to him, the ship would still have able, informed direction.

Once action was joined, Bellerophon rapidly found herself sandwiched between the Spanish Monarca and the French Aigle, both pouring fire into the British. Cumby advised his captain to remove his jacket because it made him a target for French snipers, but Cooke refused and sent Cumby below to direct the gunnery. A few minutes later, hearing the rush of battle above, Cumby ran up the ladders to the deck where he met the mortally wounded Overton who informed Cumby of Cooke's death in hand-to-hand combat with a French boarding party. Cooke's last words had been Tell Lieutenant Cumby never to strike! Realising that he was now in command of the ship, Cumby then withdrew his men from the poop deck and into the waist of the ship, where the threat from enemy grenades was not as high. He then ordered the guns trained on the French boarding parties, which they annihilated. This enabled Cumby to board the Aigle, at one point picking up a lit grenade to extinguish it, and capture the vessel.

Proclaimed a hero after the battle, Cumby was rewarded with promotion to Post Captain and given the Polyphemus, another Trafalgar veteran. With this he conducted numerous raids on the coast of Santo Domingo from 1807 to 1809. His service in the Caribbean culminated in his command of the squadron that blockaded the city of San Domingo. The operation was so successful that the city surrendered in short order, and Cumby was highly praised by his opponents for his gentlemanly behaviour following the surrender.

Cumby spent more years at sea, but none rivalled the period 1805–1809. From 1811 until 1815 he commanded Hyperion. In 1812 he was ordered to the Davis Strait to protect the whale fishery, and in 1813 was on convoy duty in the Atlantic. From 1814 to 1815 he was in the Channel.

Cumby had no further service, nevertheless, his reputation for solid service led to further rewards: command of the Royal yacht HMY Royal Sovereign, and appointed a Companion of the Order of the Bath on 26 September 1831, on the occasion of King William IV's Coronation Honours. In 1837, he was appointed Superintendent of Pembroke Dockyard; but he died in the same year in his office in Pembroke Dock, aged 66, and was buried in the Park Street graveyard at Pembroke Dock. The graveyard has now been turned into a recreational area, however Cumby's grave remains in place. A street near the royal dockyard was named Cumby Terrace in his honour. A commemorative plaque recounts his prominence, as does a similar, larger plaque at his local church St Michael's in Heighington near Durham, where he was born. The Inscription on his tomb reads

Here lie The Mortal Remains of Captain William Pryce Cumby, R.N., C.B. Of H.M. Yacht Royal Sovereign And Captain Superintendent of Pembroke Dock Yard An Officer Whose zeal and professional services At Trafalgar and St. Domingo Deserved and received the approbation Of his Country His active kindness in promoting the welfare of others procured him the affectionate regard Of all who knew him The loss of one so kind and good Has taught his relations and friends How vain is every consolation But that afforded by Religion By Christian submission By Christian Hope Born XXth March MDCCLXXI Died XXVIIth September MDCCCXXXVII

== Bibliography ==
- Tracy, Nicholas (2006). Who's Who in Nelson's Navy. London: Chatham Publishing. ISBN 1-86176-244-5.
