= HMS Fleur de la Mer =

History

United Kingdom
- Name: HMS Fleur de la Mer ("Flower of the Sea")
- Builder: Built in America
- Launched: 1806
- Acquired: 1807 by purchase of a captured vessel
- Renamed: HMS Pike (briefly, before apparently reverting)
- Fate: Foundered 1810

General characteristics
- Type: Schooner
- Tons burthen: 117 (bm)
- Length: 72 ft 3 in (22.0 m) (overall); 58 ft 10 in (17.9 m) (keel)
- Beam: 19 ft 4 in (5.9 m)
- Depth of hold: 9 ft 6 in (2.9 m)
- Propulsion: Sails
- Sail plan: Schooner
- Armament: 8 × 12-pounder carronades + 2 × 6-pounder bow chasers

HMS Fleur de la Mer was the French privateer Gipsey, captured in 1806. The British Royal Navy bought her in 1807 and she served until she foundered in 1810.

== Royal Navy service ==
In early 1808 Lieutenant Thomas Huskisson commissioned Fleur de la Mer. He had come out to the Jamaica station on Melpomene, and once there Vice-Admiral Sir B. S. Rowley appointed him to Fleur de la Mer and put him to cruising off San Domingo. There he rescued a gentleman who had fallen afoul of Henri Christophe. Huskisson also visited Cartagena, where he was able to intercede and win the release of seven persons who had accompanied General Miranda’s British-supported and unsuccessful attempted invasion of the Captaincy General of Venezuela in 1806.

In 1808 Fleur de la Mer was renamed HMS Pike after the loss of Pike the previous year. However, in September 1808 Moselle recaptured Pike. The earlier Pike apparently regained or kept her name, and the then current Pike reverted to Fleur de la Mer.

Huskisson was promoted to Commander on 19 January 1809, but did not find out about his promotion until May, at which time he transferred to command Pelorus. His successor in command of Fleur de la Mer was Lieutenant James Daly.

On 6 July 1809 Fleur de la Mer and Pike were among the vessels that carried out the blockade of the city of Santo Domingo that accompanied the siege, and they were both present at its surrender. (Note: In January 1826 prize money was paid for stores captured at Santo Domingo. A first-class share was worth £7 10s 11d; a sixth-class share, that of an ordinary seaman, was worth 2s 5d. In October 1832, prize money was paid for the ordnance stores. A first-class share was worth £67 3s 5d; a sixth-class share was worth £1 1s 3d.)

In 1810, Lieutenant John Alexander replaced Daly.

== Loss ==
In December 1810 Fleur de la Mer was escorting the merchant brig Cassius to Jamaica when they encountered heavy weather on 28 December that flooded the schooner. Her crew was barely able to pump her out and Alexander decided to head for shelter near Maracaibo. In the evening it was discovered that she had a leak and that the main beam was broken, causing the deck to sag. By midnight it was clear that Fleur de la Mer could not survive. During the night Cassius, one of the vessels that Fleur de la Mer was convoying, took off the entire crew; the next morning Fleur de la Mer sank shortly before 11am.
