= Alexandre Louis Ducrest de Villeneuve =

French Navy officer (1777–1852)

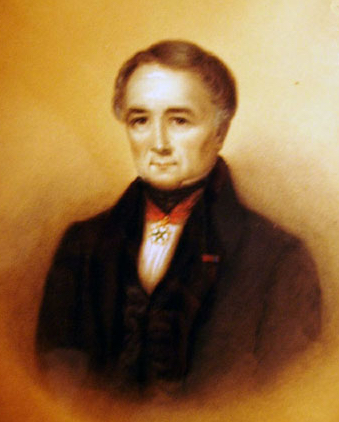
Portrait of Ducrest de Villeneuve

Counter-Admiral Alexandre Louis Ducrest de Villeneuve (Note: The Ancien Régime orthography is "Alexandre Louis du Crest de Villeneuve"; the graphy "Ducrest de Villeneuve" or "Ducrest Villeneuve" was used during the Revolution and the Empire. The archives of the Navy (see the Fonds Marine) use "Ducrest de Villeneuve", while Troude uses "Ducrest Villeneuve".) (7 March 1777 – 22 March 1852) was a French Navy officer who served in the French Revolutionary and Napoleonic Wars.

== Career ==
Ducrest de Villeneuve joined the Navy in 1791, aged 14. In 1796, he was a midshipman first class, and in 1800 he had risen to ensign. In 1805, he served on Redoutable, under Captain Lucas, and took part in the Battle of Trafalgar, where he was seriously wounded trying to board HMS Victory. Taken prisoner, he was detained on Redoutable, and narrowly escaped drowning when she foundered the next day.

In 1808, Ducrest de Villeneuve have been promoted to lieutenant and was appointed on 26 July to the command of the aviso Mouche n° 6, in Bayonne. Mouche n° 6 was sent in the Indian Ocean for a mission to Ile de France and Manila. Upon his arrival at Manila, he was taken prisoner with his entire crew, as the government had sided for the Allies. He was rescued in early September by the brig Entreprenant, under Pierre Bouvet. Ducrest de Villeneuve later published the journal of his adventures on Mouche n° 6 as Journal du voyage de "la Mouche n°6", sous le commandement du lieutenant de vaisseau Ducrest de Villeneuve, expédiée pour l'Ile de France et Manille, en 1808.

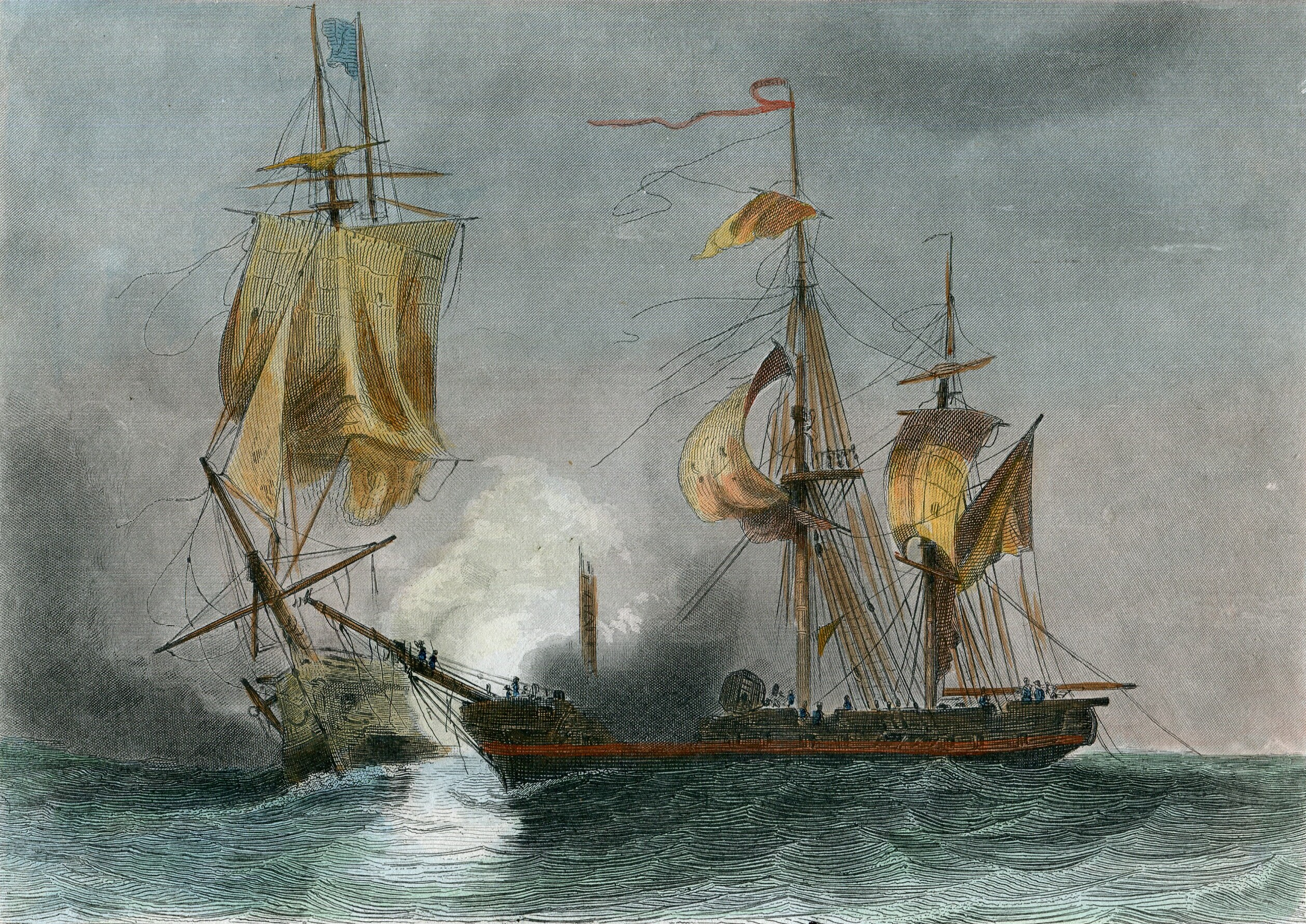
1841 illustration of capture of Alcmène by HMS Venerable

After the action of 17–18 September 1810, in which Vénus and Victor captured HMS Ceylon, Ducrest de Villeneuve was given command of the captured Ceylon. However, the very next day, a British squadron comprising HMS Boadicea, Otter and the brig Staunch encountered the battered ships, and captured them all save for Victor. Ducrest de Villeneuve was taken in captivity. Released in 1811 and promoted to commander, Ducrest took command of the 44-gun Alcmène, part of a two-frigate squadron under Jean-Léon Émeric who had his flag on the 44-gun Iphigénie. On 16 January 1814, the frigate encountered a British squadron led by the 74-gun HMS Venerable. Iphigénie on her own while Alcmène was caught up and forced into action. Ducrest de Villeneuve was wounded when he brought her alongside Venerable and attempted a boarding.

In 1816, Ducrest de Villeneuve had been released and was in command of the fluyt Normande. He ferried soldiers in the Caribbean to retake possession of the French colonies after the Bourbon Restoration. In 1818, he sailed to Ile Maurice and Ile Bourbon to ferry passengers, notably Bouvet de Lozier. In 1820, promoted to captain, he commanded the frigate Antigone, which he sailed from Rochefort to Napoli. The next year, on 3 April, he departed from Toulon to patrol off Spain and later Brazil, returning on 11 March 1822.

From 1825, Ducrest de Villeneuve commanded the frigate Astrée and was appointed to the Caribbean station, under Guy-Victor Duperré. In 1826, he took command of the station, relieving Vice-admiral Duperré. In August, the squadron sailed from Saint-Pierre et Miquelon to Martinique, returning on 20 December. In 1829, Ducrest de Villeneuve was promoted to Counter-admiral. The next year, he was appointed major general of the fleet in Toulon. In 1832, Ducrest de Villeneuve was given command of an eleven-ship division that surveilled the coasts of Holland in the aftermath of the Ten Days' Campaign and the Belgian Revolution, with his flag on Médée. The next year, Ducrest de Villeneuve became préfet maritime of Lorient. He retired in 1842 and died on 22 March 1852.

== Honours ==
- Grand officer of the Legion of Honour, 26 April 1840.

== Sources and references ==
=== Bibliography ===
- Narcisse-Achille de Salvandy, Notice biographique sur le contre-amiral Ducrest de Villeneuve, Nouvelles Annales de la marine et des colonies, P. Dupont, Paris, avril 1852
- Hubert Granier, Histoire des marins français: 1815-1870, la marche vers la République, 2002
- P. Lerot, Les gloires maritimes de la France: notices biographiques sur les plus célèbres marins, 186
- Fonds Marine. Campagnes (opérations; divisions et stations navales; missions diverses). Inventaire de la sous-série Marine BB4. Tome deuxième : BB4 1 à 482 (1790-1826)
- Roche, Jean-Michel (2005). Dictionnaire des bâtiments de la flotte de guerre française de Colbert à nos jours, 1671 - 1870. Group Retozel-Maury Millau. p. 344. ISBN 978-2-9525917-0-6. OCLC 165892922.
- Troude, Onésime-Joachim (1867). Batailles navales de la France. Vol. 3. Challamel ainé.
- Troude, Onésime-Joachim (1867). Batailles navales de la France. Vol. 4. Challamel ainé.
- James, William (2002) [1827]. The Naval History of Great Britain, Volume 1, 1793–1796. London: Conway Maritime Press. ISBN 0-85177-905-0. OCLC 165702223.
- Ducrest de Villeneuve, Alexandre-Louis (1857). Journal du voyage de "la Mouche n°6", sous le commandement du lieutenant de vaisseau Ducrest de Villeneuve, expédiée pour l'Ile de France et Manille, en 1808. P. Dupont.
- Granier, Hubert. "Notice biographique sur le contre-amiral Ducrest de Villeneuve". Histoire des marins français,1815-1870. Paris: Narcisse-Achille de Salvandy.
