= Jean-Léon Émeric =

French naval officer

Jean-Léon Émeric was a French naval officer.

== Career ==
In late 1808, Émeric, ranking Lieutenant, served as first officer on the frigate Junon. Under Jean-Baptiste-Augustin Rousseau, he sailed for a cruise from Le Havre to Cherbourg, and then ferrying troops from Cherbourg to Basse-Terre. On 20 December 1808, Junon fought the British 18-gun corvette HMS St Christopher, but did not give chase for fear of lacking wind and being exposed to the British blockade. Junon arrived at the Saintes in mid-January 1809, and departed on 7 February. The next day, she was detected by the brigs HMS Asp and Supérieure, who shadowed Junon and harassed her. The cannonade attracted the attention of the frigates HMS Latona and Horatio, who gave chase and started the action of 10 February 1809. Émeric assumed command when Rousseau was mortally wounded, and fought until his mainmast collapsed; surrounded by three opponents, Émeric struck his colours. The mizzen and foremasts collapsed soon after the ensign had been hoisted down.

By 1813, Émeric had been promoted to Commander, and served in the division of Cherbourg, under contre-amiral Amable Troude, commanding the frigate Iphigénie. In early 1814, he led a two-frigate squadron comprising Iphigénie and Alcmène, under Commander Ducrest de Villeneuve, for a cruise between the Azores and Cap-Vert, off Guinea. On 16 January 1814, the frigates encountered a British squadron, comprising the 74-gun third-rate ship of the line Venerable, her prize, the ex-French letter of marque brig Jason, and Cyane; they attempted to flee, but Alcmène was soon overrun and captured. Iphigénie escaped, but from their capture of Alcmène the British learnt her planned route, and managed to bring her into action on 20 January, capturing her.

In 1818, Émeric captained the fluyt Ariège for a cruise between Genoa and Palerme. In 1821, he had been promoted to captain and was in command of the Romulus, which had been razéed and renamed Guerrière. In 1822, he ferried Guilleau de Formont, French consul in Sardigna, from Toulon to Cagliari, and sailed on to Algiers to transport despatches, before returning to Toulon.

== Sources and references ==
=== Bibliography ===
- Roche, Jean-Michel (2005). Dictionnaire des bâtiments de la flotte de guerre française de Colbert à nos jours, 1671 - 1870. Group Retozel-Maury Millau. p. 344. ISBN 978-2-9525917-0-6. OCLC 165892922.
- Fonds Marine. Campagnes (opérations; divisions et stations navales; missions diverses). Inventaire de la sous-série Marine BB4. Tome deuxième : BB4 1 à 482 (1790-1826)
- Troude, Onésime-Joachim (1867). Batailles navales de la France. Vol. 3. Challamel ainé. pp. 160–162.
- Troude, Onésime-Joachim (1867). Batailles navales de la France. Vol. 4. Challamel ainé. pp. 160–162.
- James, William (2002) [1827]. The Naval History of Great Britain, Volume 1, 1793–1796. London: Conway Maritime Press. ISBN 0-85177-905-0. OCLC 165702223.
