= Hugh Pigot (Royal Navy officer, born 1775) =

Royal Navy Admiral (1775–1857)

Admiral Sir Hugh Pigot KCB KCH
- Born: 1775
- Died: 29 July 1857 (aged 81–82)
- Relatives: Lord Pigot (father); Lt.-Gen. Robert Pigot (uncle); Adm. Hugh Pigot (uncle); Gen. Henry Pigot (cousin); Capt. Hugh Pigot (cousin); Gen. Richard Pigot (brother); Maj. George Pigot (brother)
- Military career
- Allegiance: Great Britain; United Kingdom
- Branch: Royal Navy
- Service years: 1788–1847
- Rank: Admiral
- Commands: HMS Speedy; HMS Dauntless; HMS Alligator; HMS Circe; HMS Captain; HMS Latona; HMS Orpheus; HMS Diomede; HMS Nymphe; HMS Ramillies; HMS Talavera; HMS Barham; Cork Station
- Conflicts: French Revolutionary Wars; Siege of Toulon; Napoleonic Wars; Invasion of Martinique; Troude's expedition to the Caribbean; Action of 10 February 1809; War of 1812

Admiral Sir Hugh Pigot KCB KCH (1775 – 29 July 1857) was an officer of the Royal Navy, who served in the French Revolutionary and Napoleonic Wars, and the War of 1812.

== Biography ==
=== Early life and career ===
He was born the illegitimate son of George Pigot, 1st Baron Pigot (1719–1777), and Catherine Hill, and was thus a nephew of Lieutenant-General Robert Pigot and Admiral Hugh Pigot, and a cousin of General Henry Pigot and the notorious Captain Hugh Pigot. His brothers Richard and George both had distinguished careers in the army, rising to the rank of general and major respectively.

Pigot entered the Navy on 1 May 1788, first serving aboard the 50-gun fourth-rate ship Salisbury, under the command of Captain Erasmus Gower, and the flagship of Rear-Admiral John Elliot, Commodore-Governor of Newfoundland. Later in the year he moved into the sloop Merlin, Captain Edward Pakenham. He then served for three years in home waters under Captain Andrew Snape Douglas, as a midshipman in the frigate Southampton, and in the guard ships Goliath and Alcide. In 1792 he sailed for the Mediterranean aboard the 50-gun Romney, flagship of Rear-Admiral Samuel Granston Goodall, who he followed into the 98-gun ship Princess Royal in May 1793.

Following the evacuation of Toulon in December 1793, he was appointed acting-lieutenant of the 74-gun Berwick, Captain Andrew Sutherland (mariner), then served for a short period as midshipman in the Princess Royal, and in the 100-gun Britannia, flagship of Admiral William Hotham. He was officially promoted to lieutenant on 12 November 1794 to serve aboard the sloop Fleche, under the Captains the Honourable Henry Hotham, Shuldham Peard, and Edwards. His next appointments were to the Gladiator, Captain John Pakenham; the frigate Surprise, under Captains Ralph Willett Miller and Edward Hamilton; the 74-gun Monarch, flagship of Vice Admiral Sir Richard Onslow; and the Aeolus, Captain John William Spranger. In those ships he served in the Mediterranean, Newfoundland, the North Sea, Baltic, and Jamaica stations. Promoted to commander on 29 April 1802, Pigot commanded the brig-sloop Speedy off Seaford from 24 August 1803, until promoted to post-captain on 8 May 1804.

=== Post-captain ===
On 27 March 1805 Pigot commissioned the sloop Dauntless at Sheerness, but remained in her only for three months. He commanded the sixth rate Alligator, and then from 28 June 1806 the 32-gun fifth-rate Circe, both in the West Indies. On 5 April 1807 Circe captured the French privateer Austerlitz of 18 guns and 125 men. On 2 March 1808, he captured the island of Marie-Galante, and on 31 October, off Martinique, he captured the Palinure of 16 guns and 79 men, 7 of whom were killed and 8 wounded, with a loss to the Circe, having come under fire from a battery on the Diamond Rock, of one man killed and one wounded. He commanded the 74-gun Captain and then the frigate Latona, on the same station, and commanded the blockading squadron off Guadeloupe at the start of 1809 in the latter ship. On 10 February 1809, Latona assisted in the capture of French frigate Junon, of 46 guns and 323 men, whose fire wounded six of Latona's crew. The exertions and activity Pigot displayed in erecting jury-masts, and putting the prize into a seaworthy state, gained him the warm official thanks of the senior officer present, Captain George Scott, of the Horatio. On 17 April 1809 Pigot witnessed (and was much praised for his spirited exertions during the chase which preceded) the surrender of the French 74-gun ship D'Hautpoul; and on 18 June in the same year took part in the capture of the Félicité, pierced for 42 guns, but having only 14 of her main-deck armament mounted, with a complement of 174 men, and a cargo of sugar, coffee, etc.

Pigot then moved into the frigate Orpheus, in which he spent the next four years stationed in the West Indies and at Halifax. In her, during the War of 1812 against the United States, he destroyed the 8-gun letter of marque Wampoe on 28 April 1813, and the 20-gun privateer Holkar on 11 May 1813.

On 27 March 1814 Pigot was sent on a secret reconnaissance mission to the Gulf Coast, to determine the defences of the mouth of the Mississippi River (Plaquemines Parish), and other routes by which New Orleans could be attacked, whilst determining the strength of available American troops. In a letter dated 13 April 1814, he recommended to Vice Admiral Cochrane that a weakly defended New Orleans should be attacked. On 20 April 1814 he captured the USS Frolic, of twenty 32-pounder carronades, two long 18-pounder guns, and 171 men. Pigot reported to Cochrane, about the mission to disembark Captain Woodbine, with a supply of arms for the Indian allies, after a meeting of various elders aboard the Orpheus on 20 May 1814.

From the end of 1814 he commanded the 50-gun Diomede, and then the frigate Nymphe, on the coast of North America. The Nymphe, accompanied by the sloop-of-war HMS Herald (18 guns), the brig-of-war HMS Thistle (12 guns), the schooner HMS Pigmy (10 guns), and two bomb vessels, was ordered to create a distraction near the Mississippi. The Nymphe was too large to proceed up river with the flotilla, so Pigot embarked the Herald on 8 January 1815, and disembarked on 18 January, to return to the Nymphe. He returned to England, he and the ship were paid off in August 1815.

=== Post-war career and honours ===
On 3 November 1825 Pigot was appointed Superintendent of the Coast Blockade, commanding the 74-gun ship Ramillies, and then from 15 September 1829 the Talavera, serving on The Downs station. On 9 March 1831, he took command of the Barham, serving in the Mediterranean for the next three years. He was made a Companion of the Order of the Bath (CB) on 26 September 1831, and in 1834 made a Knight Commander of the Royal Guelphic Order (KCH) and at the same time a Knight Bachelor. He was promoted to rear-admiral on 10 January 1837. From 16 May 1844 to 1 July 1847 Pigot was Commander-in-Chief on the Cork Station. He was made a Knight Commander of the Order of the Bath on 8 July 1847, and was promoted to vice-admiral on 6 August 1847. and was promoted to admiral on 4 July 1853. He retired to Chieveley in Berkshire and died on 29 July 1857.

Military offices
Preceded by New Post	Commander-in-Chief, Cork Station; 1844–1847	Succeeded by Thomas Ussher
