= USS Cyane (1815) =

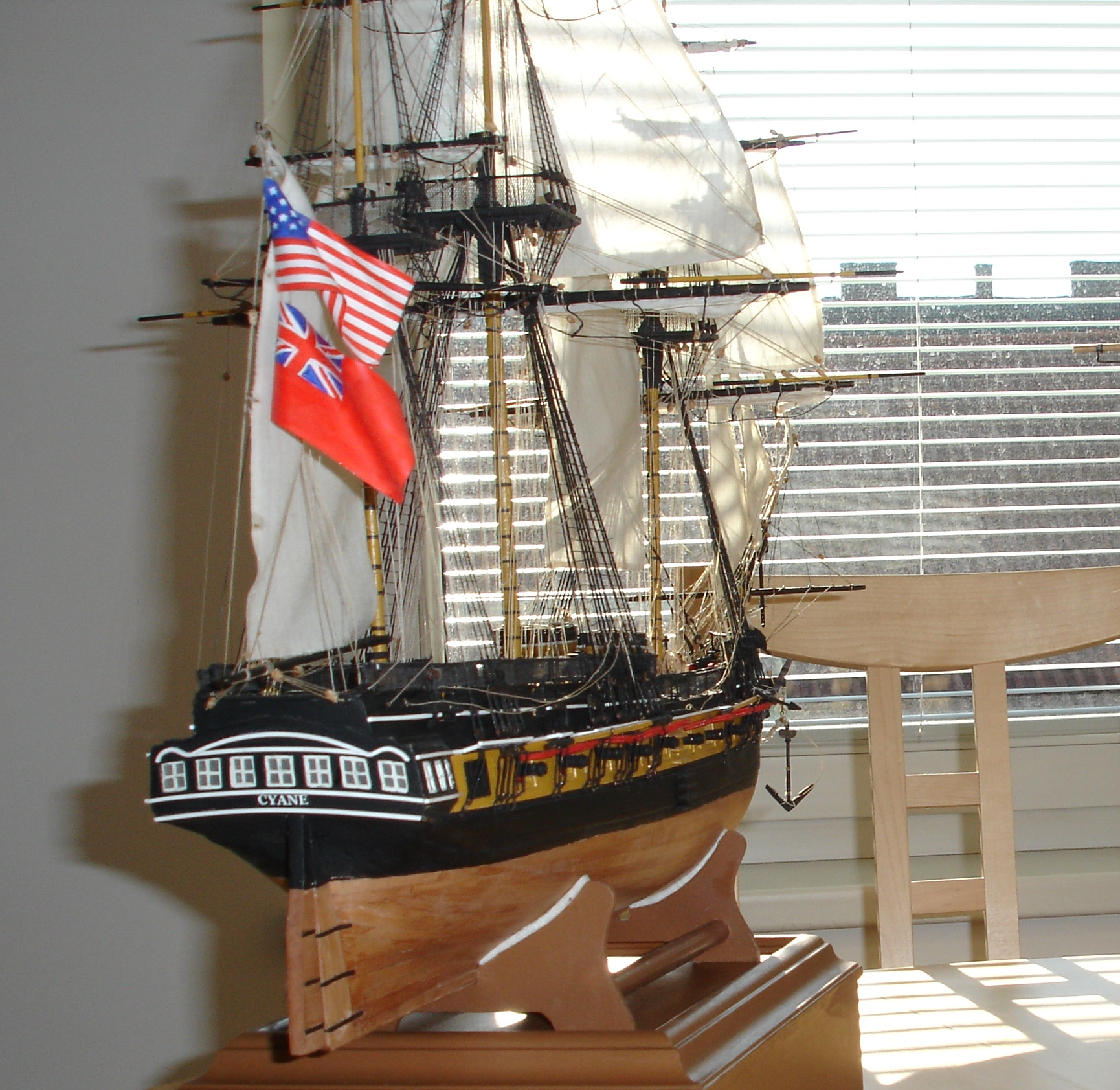

History

United Kingdom
- Name: Cyane
- Ordered: 30 January 1805
- Laid down: August 1805
- Launched: 14 October 1806
- Commissioned: March 1807
- Fate: Captured by USS Constitution, 20 February 1815

United States
- Name: Cyane
- Acquired: Captured 20 February 1815
- Commissioned: 1815
- Decommissioned: 1827
- Fate: Broken up, 1836

General characteristics
- Class & type: Banterer-class sixth-rate
- Tonnage: 539
- Length: 118 ft 2 in (36.02 m)
- Beam: 32 ft 0.5 in (9.766 m)
- Depth: 10 ft 6 in (3.20 m)
- Propulsion: Sail
- Complement: 180 officers and enlisted (in USN service)
- Armament: 32 guns: 4 × 12 pdr (5.4 kg) guns; 20 × 32 pdr (15 kg) carronades; 8 × 18 pdr (8.2 kg) carronades

Cyane was a Royal Navy sailing Banterer-class sixth-rate ship of 22 guns, built in 1806 at Topsham, near Exeter, England. She was ordered in January 1805 as HMS Columbine and was renamed Cyane on 6 December of that year.

Under Captain Thomas Staines she captured the Spanish privateer Medusa in 1808 which was the last ship captured by the British before Spain turned against Napoleon. In May 1809 she was badly damaged during a battle with French gunboats and the French frigate Ceres.

She was captured with HMS Levant on 20 February 1815 by USS Constitution after a 40-minute night engagement off Madeira. With Constitution's second lieutenant Hoffman as prize master, she successfully escaped recapture by a pursuing British squadron on 12 March and arrived in America on 10 April. She was adjudicated by a prize court and purchased by the Navy and renamed USS Cyane.

Cyane cruised off the west coast of Africa from 1819–1820 and in the West Indies from 1820–1821 protecting the Liberian colony and suppressing piracy and the slave trade. In this regard she was a predecessor to the Africa Squadron. She cruised in the Mediterranean 1824–1825, and on the Brazil Station 1826–1827. Laid up at Philadelphia Navy Yard, she sank in 1835 and was raised and broken up the following year.

The April/May 1983 issue of American Heritage magazine carried an article "What it was like to be Shot up by Old Ironsides" concerning the discovery of three pages of HMS Cyane's logbook from 13 to 20 February 1815, with a transcription of 20 February 1815 battle.

== See also ==
- Capture of Cyane
