= HMS Orpheus (1809) =

Frigate of the Royal Navy

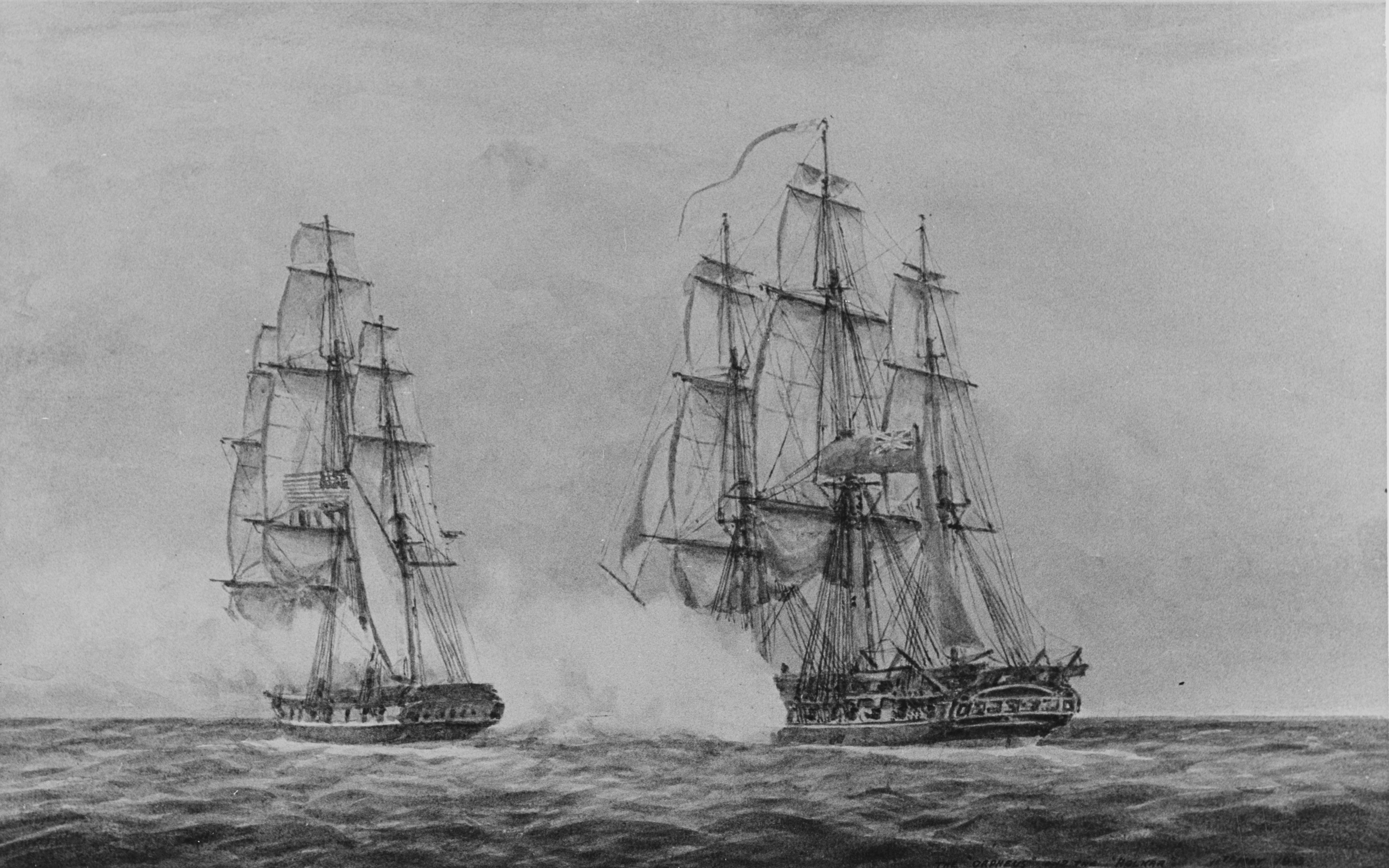
- Illustration of Orpheus (right) attacking Holkar by Irwin John David Bevan

History

United Kingdom
- Name: HMS Orpheus
- Ordered: 27 February 1808
- Builder: Deptford Dockyard
- Laid down: August 1808
- Launched: 12 August 1809
- Completed: By 21 September 1809
- Fate: Broken up in August 1819

General characteristics
- Class & type: Apollo-class frigate
- Tons burthen: 94728/94 (bm)
- Length: 145 ft (44.2 m) (gundeck); 121 ft 8 3/4 in (37.1 m) (keel)
- Beam: 38 ft 3 in (11.7 m)
- Depth of hold: 13 ft 4 in (4.1 m)
- Sail plan: Full-rigged ship
- Complement: 264
- Armament: Upper deck: 26 × 18-pounder guns; QD: 2 × 9-pounder guns + 10 × 32-pounder carronades; Fc: 2 × 9-pounder guns + 4 × 32-pounder carronades

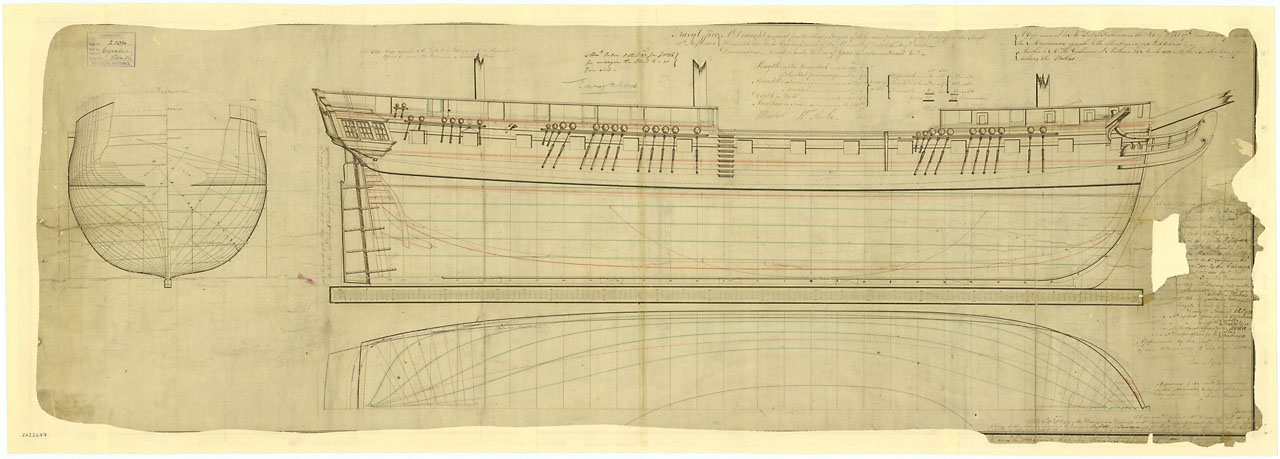
Plan of an Apollo-class frigate dated 1803

HMS Orpheus was a 36-gun Apollo-class fifth-rate frigate of the Royal Navy launched in 1809 from Deptford Dockyard. She was broken up in 1819.

== Construction ==
Ordered on 27 February 1807 and laid down in August 1808 at Deptford Dockyard. Launched on 12 August 1809 and completed on 21 September 1809.

== Service ==
Pigot was the ship's captain, in which he spent the next four years stationed in the West Indies and at Halifax. In her, during the War of 1812 against the United States, he destroyed the 8-gun letter of marque Wampoe on 28 April 1813, and the 20-gun privateer Holkar on 11 May 1813. On 20 April 1814 he captured the USS Frolic, of twenty 32-pounder carronades, two long 18-pounder guns, and 171 men. From the end of 1814 he commanded the 50-gun Diomede, and then the frigate Nymphe, on the coast of North America, before returning to England in August 1815.

Orpheus also saw service in the War of 1812. While in Long Island Sound, she chased the American privateer Holkar and ran her aground, before destroying Holkar by cannon fire.

Orpheus was part of the British patrolling squadron in Long Island Sound. When the British fleet encountered an American fleet, commanded by Stephen Decatur it chased them to New London where the American fleet escaped. The British squadron there formed a blockade, confining the American fleet until the end of the war.

On 27 April Orpheus chased the American ship Whampoa on shore near Newport, Rhode Island. Whampoa had been sailing from Lorient. The British took possession of Whampoa but then abandoned her due to fire from the shore.

On 20 April 1814 the schooner HMS Shelburne (1813), with the frigate Orpheus closing, captured the US sloop Frolic.

During May 1814, accompanied by the schooner Shelburne, the Orpheus was moored off Spanish Florida. It hosted a meeting of the Chiefs of the Creek Nation, who were being courted by the British as allies in the War of 1812. Subsequent to this meeting, weapons and other gifts were provided by the British.

As of 5 July 1814, she arrived in Halifax, Nova Scotia, with her prize, the late US ship Frolic. On 20 September 1814, she arrived in Portsmouth, having departed from Halifax on 22 August 1814. She was reported to have moored in Plymouth and Portsmouth on 5 December 1814.

== Fate ==
She was broken up at Chatham Dockyard in August 1819.
