= American privateer Holkar =

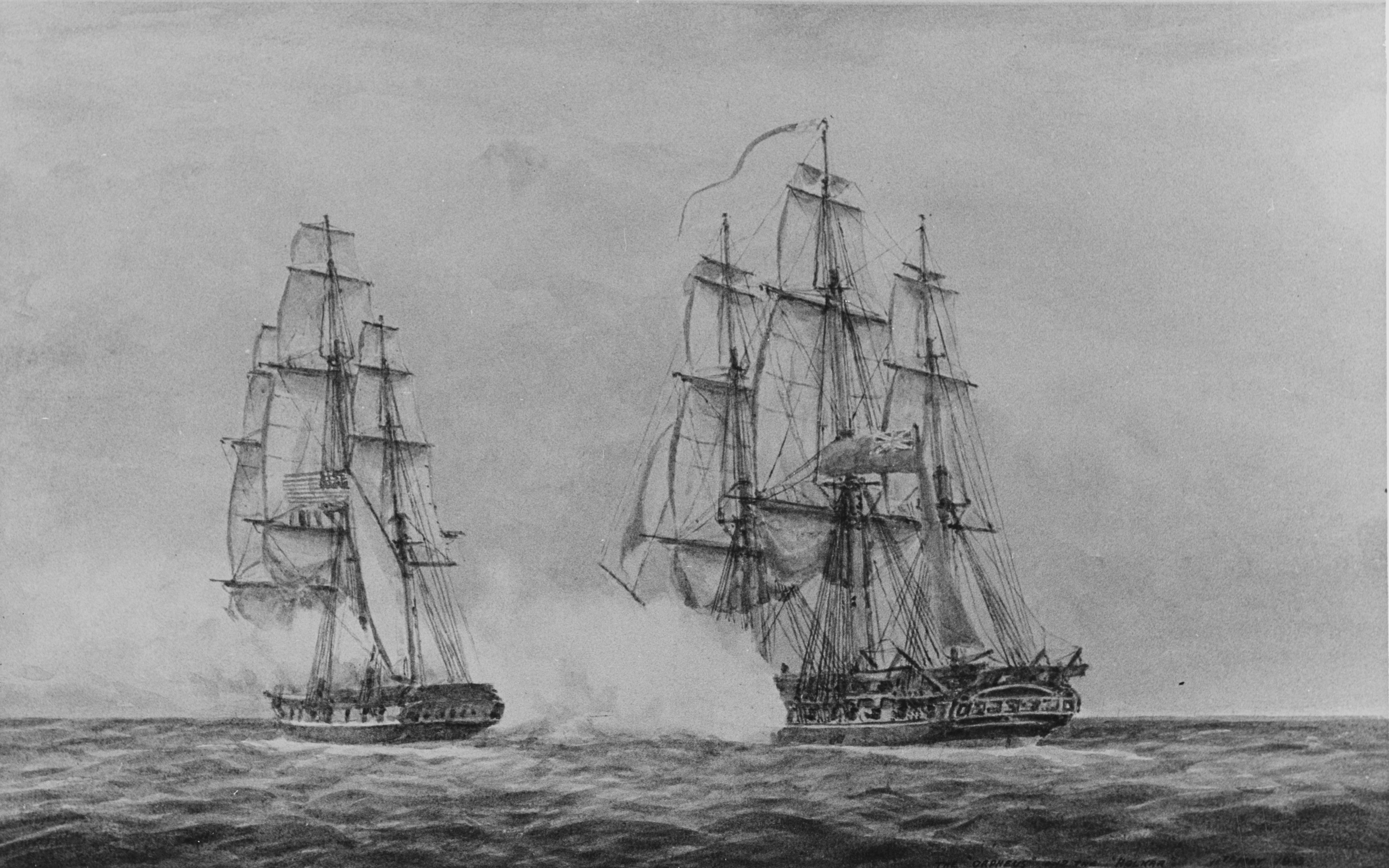
- Illustration of Holkar (left) under attack from HMS Orpheus by Irwin John David Bevan

History

United States
- Name: Holkar
- Operator: J. Rowland
- Fate: Run ashore and destroyed, 11 May 1813

General characteristics
- Class & type: Brig
- Propulsion: Sail
- Complement: 150 men
- Armament: 16 guns

Holkar was an American privateer active during the War of 1812 that made several captures. HMS Orpheus destroyed her on 11 May 1813.

== Career ==
Holkar sailed under the command of Captain J. Rowland.

On 30 November 1812 Holkar captured the 220-ton (bm) 10-gun British brig Emu, under the command of Lieutenant Alexander Bissett. Emu was transporting 49 female convicts to Australia. Holkar eventually put the convicts and crew ashore at Porto Grande on São Vicente, Cape Verde. Lloyd's List reported on 16 April 1813 that Holkar had captured Emu, of 10 guns and 25 men, on 16 November, and put crew and convicts ashore at Cape Verde on 15 January 1813. A prize crew took Emu to Newport, Rhode Island where arrived at about 10 February. Her captors sold Emu at Newport.

In early 1813 Holkar captured the 600-ton (bm) British ship Aurora, which was sailing from Liverpool to Pernambuco with a cargo of dry goods (later valued at $350,000), bringing her into Newport, Rhode Island.

Holkar also captured the British privateer schooner Richard off Anguilla, taking her into Savannah, Georgia, and an unknown 14-gun brig and two other merchant ships were taken to New York.

== Fate ==
On 11 May 1813 the British frigate HMS Orpheus, commanded by Captain Hugh Pigot, chased Holkar in Long Island Sound. Holkar ran aground and then Orpheus destroyed her by cannon fire.
