= Action of 10 February 1809 =

Naval engagement during the French Revolutionary Wars

Coordinates: 19°50′N 61°30′W

- Part of the Caribbean campaign of 1803–1810
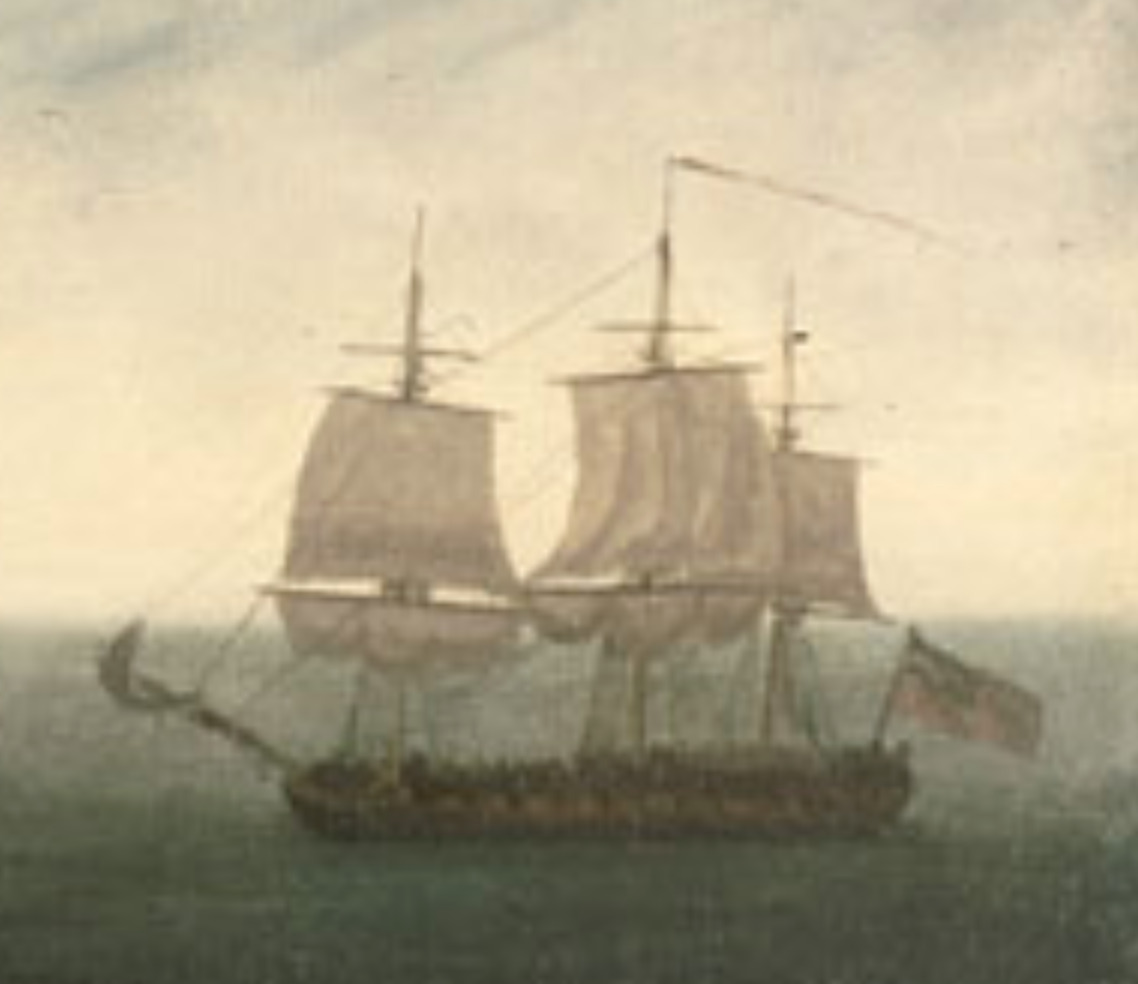
- 1781 painting of HMS Latona
Date	8–10 February 1809
Location	Off the Leeward Islands, Atlantic Ocean
Result	British victory

Belligerents
United Kingdom	France

Commanders and leaders
Hugh Pigot	Jean-Baptiste-Augustin Rousseau †

Strength
2 frigates 3 brig-sloops	1 frigate

Casualties and losses
7 killed 33 wounded	130 killed or wounded 1 frigate captured

The action of 10 February 1809 was a minor naval engagement of the Napoleonic Wars, in which a British Royal Navy squadron chased and captured the French frigate Junon in the Caribbean Sea. Junon was on a mission to carry trade goods from the Îles des Saintes near Guadeloupe back to France and was part of a succession of French warships sent during 1808 and the early months of 1809 in an effort to break the British blockade of the French Caribbean, which was destroying the economies and morale of the islands. Having landed supplies, Junon's return cargo was intended to improve the economic situation on Guadeloupe with much needed oceanic trade.

The patrolling British warships first sighted Junon in the Virgin Islands on 8 February. They then chased her north into the Atlantic Ocean for two days until the frigates HMS Horatio and HMS Latona were able to bring her to action. In a bitterly contested running engagement, Junon was badly damaged and suffered heavy casualties before surrendering to the numerically superior British force. She was later commissioned into the Royal Navy under the same name and remained in the Caribbean. Less than a year after her capture, a French convoy to Guadeloupe recaptured and destroyed Junon; the British subsequently intercepted and defeated the convoy in turn.

== Background ==
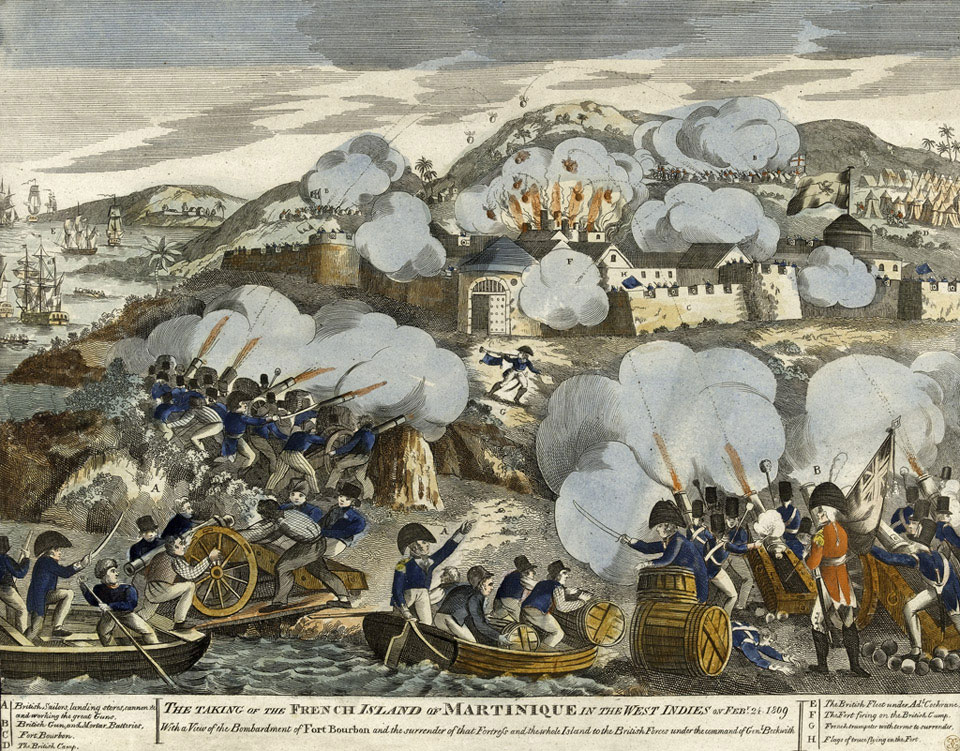
1809 illustration of the invasion of Martinique

By 1809, the Napoleonic Wars were six years old and the British Royal Navy was dominant at sea. Blockaded in their home ports by British squadrons, French warships, merchant ships and transports were unable to sail and, as a result, the French colonies in the West Indies were largely cut off from France. These colonies were also closely blockaded themselves and, as a result, their ability to trade independently was severely curtailed, resulting in economic collapse, severe food shortages and social unrest. Messages warning of the deteriorating situation in the colonies had been sent during the summer of 1808, particularly from the islands of Martinique and Guadeloupe. In response supplies had been sent from France in small convoys and individual frigates in the autumn. The British blockading ships had also intercepted the communications from the island, and relayed the information to the Admiralty in London, who had ordered Vice-Admiral Sir Alexander Cochrane to assemble a force and invade the French colonies before reinforcements and supplies could reach them.

The majority of the French attempts to reach the Caribbean ended in failure. Several ships were intercepted in the Bay of Biscay, while others reached the Caribbean, only to be defeated by ships from Cochrane's squadron, which was focused on preparations for the invasion of Martinique, planned for February. Only two ships reached the islands safely, the 40–gun frigates Junon at Guadeloupe and Amphitrite at Martinique. By February 1809, Martinique was under attack, distracting most of the available British ships from the blockade of Guadeloupe. Taking advantage of the temporary absence of enemy shipping, Junon slipped out of the Îles des Saintes to the south of Guadeloupe on 4 February and sailed north. The French captain, Jean-Baptiste-Augustin Rousseau, had dropped off his military and food supplies and taken on board large quantities of trade goods for sale in France in an effort to revive the Guadeloupe economy.

== Battle ==
At 14:00 on 8 February, four days after leaving the Îles des Saintes, Junon was spotted passing close to the Virgin Islands by the small British brigs HMS Superieure and HMS Asp, who signalled the approaching ship to halt and prepare for boarding. Ignoring the orders from the smaller ships, Rousseau continued northwards, passing through the Virgin Islands closely followed by Superieure, although Asp was unable to keep up and fell far behind during the night. At 08:00 on the morning of 9 February, with Virgin Gorda northwest, Superieure was close enough to open fire, a few long range shots failing to damage the large frigate, which responded with an ineffective broadside. The gunfire attracted other ships, and during the afternoon Superieure was joined by the British frigate HMS Latona, under Captain Hugh Pigot.

The chase continued through a second night, the French frigate making significant gains over her pursuers but still unable to escape them completely. At 10:30 on 10 February, two sails appeared in the southeast, set on a course that would cut in front of the French frigate. These were the British frigate HMS Horatio under Captain George Scott and the brig HMS Driver. With enemies on all sides, Rousseau recognised that his only hope of escape lay in defeating Horatio: a swift victory would enable him to outrun pursuit from the east, travelling westwards into the Atlantic. Rapidly closing with the new arrivals, Junon opened fire at 12:36. Horatio immediately responded and then circled the slower French vessel and raked her before Rousseau could respond. Drawing close, the frigates exchanged broadsides at point blank range for 40 minutes. The heavier weight of the French ship soon told, with Scott and his first lieutenant severely wounded and their masts badly damaged. Unable to keep up with the French frigate, whose hull was badly holed but whose masts were only lightly damaged, Horatio fell back.

Rousseau had also been badly wounded in the exchange, and command of Junon passed to Frigate-lieutenant Jean-Léon Émeric, who attempted to pull away from his battered adversary. As he did so the small brig Driver was well placed to intervene, but her captain, Charles Claridge, failed to engage the larger frigate, even though Latona was now rapidly approaching from the west and together they could have outnumbered and outmanoeuvred Junon. Superieure was also close by, and her captain, William Ferrie, did approach the larger French ship, his fire causing enough damage to Junon's sails to prevent her escape. Taking Horatio in tow at 14:24, the brig kept Scott's frigate in the chase until sufficient repairs were complete. By 14:40 Horatio was again sailing independently and Driver finally came close enough to open fire, although at extreme range: Claridge refused to sail any closer to Junon, despite urgent signals from Horatio and Superieure. At 15:04, Superieure was again close enough to the French ship to open fire and at 15:25 Latona arrived, her presence finally convincing Claridge to enter the action. Surrounded by enemy ships and his sails in tatters, Emeric made one last effort to escape to the north, the strain of this manoeuvre causing his mainmast and mizzenmast to collapse. With both flight and resistance impossible, Junon surrendered at 15:40.

== Aftermath ==
Halifax Harbour, where the captured Junon was taken

Officers from Latona were first to board the French frigate but Emeric refused to tender his formal surrender except to an officer of Horatio because he insisted that Horatio had caused the entirety of Junon's damage. British historians have debated this opinion: William James agreed with this assessment, but also opined that if Horatio had been alone it would have been Scott surrendering rather than the French officers, such was the damage his ship had suffered in the battle. Edward Pelham Brenton, who was a serving officer in the Caribbean at the time, gives most of the credit for the victory to Latona, in a detailed account that James later criticised for its inaccuracies. The battered Junon was taken in tow to Halifax, Nova Scotia, where she was repaired and later commissioned into the Royal Navy under the same name. The prisoners were also landed in Nova Scotia, including Rousseau, who died from his wounds soon afterwards. The French lost approximately 130 casualties; British losses were seven killed and 26 wounded on Horatio, six wounded on Latona and one man wounded on Driver.

The British commanders and crews were praised for their actions in the battle, with the exception of Claridge in Driver. Both James and Brenton in their later histories heavily criticised his noted reluctance to engage the enemy. By contrast William Ferrie, commander of Superieure was commended for maintaining combat with the much larger frigate whenever possible. Four decades later, in 1847, the Admiralty recognized the battle with the clasps "Horatio 10 Feby. 1809" and "Superieure 10 Feby. 1809" to the Naval General Service Medal, which it awarded upon application to all British participants then still living.

In the month following the capture of Junon, Guadeloupe was the only French colony in the Caribbean not under attack; Martinique fell to the British on 24 February and Spanish forces continued their Siege of Santo Domingo. The French did make further attempts to resupply the islands; a major expedition was defeated off Guadeloupe in April, and elements of this force that reached the island were defeated and captured during June and July. With British forces distracted by the ongoing Reconquista in Santo Domingo, the focus of the campaign moved north, and it was not until a second major expedition arrived in December that significant British forces returned to the Leeward Islands for the final invasion of Guadeloupe. The influx of British reinforcements was too late for HMS Junon; on 13 December she had been cruising alone to the east of Antigua and been surprised by François Roquebert's squadron of four French frigates. Outnumbered and surrounded, Junon fought hard but was eventually forced to surrender after Captain John Shortland was mortally wounded. Reduced to a sinking condition in the engagement, Junon was set on fire and abandoned by Roquebert, whose ships were intercepted five days later off Guadeloupe and defeated: two were destroyed and two others returned to France without landing their supplies.
