= French frigate Iphigénie (1810) =

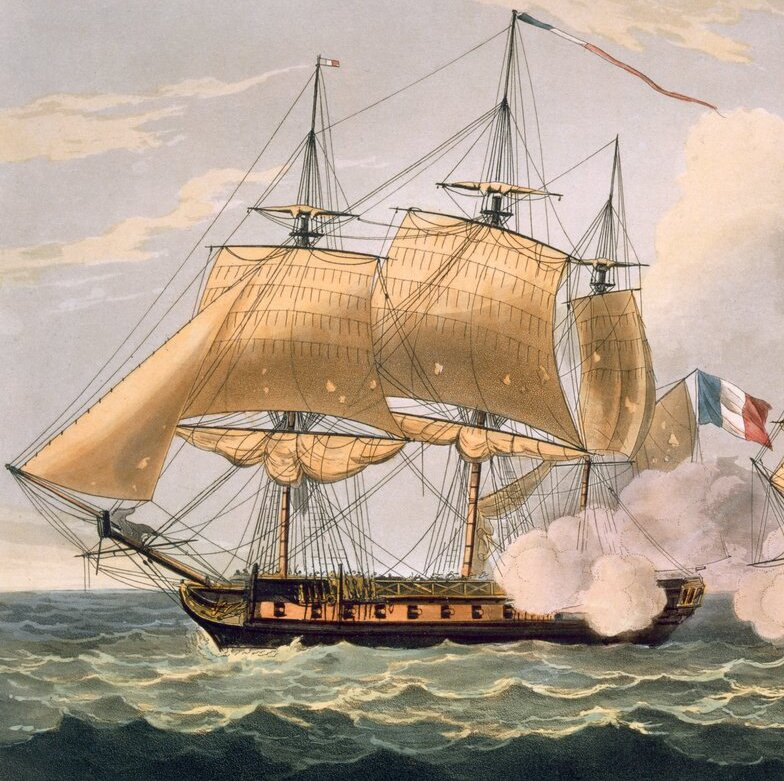
- Clorinde, a sister ship of Iphigénie

History

France
- Name: Iphigénie
- Builder: Cherbourg
- Laid down: May 1809
- Launched: 20 May 1810
- Captured: 20 January 1814

United Kingdom
- Name: Palma
- Acquired: 20 January 1814 (by capture)
- Renamed: HMS Gloire
- Fate: Sold 1817

General characteristics
- Class & type: Pallas-class frigate
- Tons burthen: 106614/94 (bm)
- Length: 154 ft 5 in (47.07 m) (overall); 126 ft 10 1/4 in (38.7 m) (keel)
- Beam: 39 ft 9 in (12.12 m)
- Depth of hold: 12 ft 7 1/2 in (3.848 m)
- Propulsion: Sails
- Complement: French service:325; British service:300-15
- Armament: French service; Battery: 28 18-pounders; Quarterdeck & forecastle: 8 × 8-pounder long guns; 8 × 36-pounder carronades or 12 × 18-pounder carronades; British service: (Note: It is not clear that she actually was ever rearmed.); UD:28 × 18-pounder guns; QD:14 × 32-pounder carronades; Fc:2 × 9-pounder guns + 2 × 32-pounder carronades

Iphigénie was a 44-gun Pallas-class frigate of the French Navy launched in 1810. The British captured her in 1814. The British named her HMS Palma, and then renamed her HMS Gloire. She was sold in 1817, never having been commissioned into the Royal Navy.

In 1813, along with Alcmène, she served at Cherbourg, in the squadron of contre-amiral Amable Troude, to protect the harbour.

== Capture ==
In early 1814, Commander Jean-Léon Émeric was put in charge of a two-frigate squadron comprising Iphigénie and Alcmène, under Commander Ducrest de Villeneuve, for a cruise between the Azores and Cap-Vert, off Guinea.

On 16 January 1814, the British 74-gun third-rate ship of the line Venerable, together with her prize, the ex-French letter of marque brig Jason, and sixth-rate post ship Cyane were in company when they spotted Alcmène and Iphigénie. After a chase that left Cyane far behind, Venerable captured Alcmène after a fight. Venerable lost two men dead and four wounded, while the French lost 32 dead and 50 wounded.

Jason and Cyane then pursued Iphigénie and initially fired on her but broke off the engagement because they were outgunned. Cyane continued the chase for over three days until Venerable was able to rejoin the fight, after having sailed 153 miles in the direction she believed that Iphigénie had taken. On 20 January, after a 19-hour chase - amounting in all to a four-day chase for Iphigénie - Venerable captured the quarry, having again left Cyane behind. In order to try to gain speed, Iphigénie cast off her anchors and threw her boats overboard. She apparently did not resist after Venerable came up. (Note: A first-class share of the prize money for both vessels, including head money for Alcmène, was £819 16s 4½d; a sixth-class share, that of an ordinary seaman, for Iphigénie was worth £2 1s 8¼d. For Alcmène, a sixth-class share was worth £3 9s 4d.) Before meeting up with the British ships, the two French vessels had taken some eight prizes. The action resulted in the award in 1847, to any surviving claimants, of the Naval General Service Medal with clasps "Venerable 16 Jany 1814" and "Cyane 16 Jany. 1814".

Venerable was able to locate Iphigénie because Commander Ducrest de Villeneuve of Alcmène was so angry at Captain Émeric, the senior French commander, for not having come alongside Venerable to board from the other side, that he essentially revealed the rendezvous instructions to Admiral Durham. (Venerable was Durham's flagship). When some prisoners from Iphigénie's crew were brought on Venerable, the crew from Alcmène too were enraged. Durham had to station Royal Marines between them, with fixed bayonets, to prevent fighting from breaking out.

== Fate ==
A prize crew brought Iphigénie into Plymouth on 23 February 1814, and she was laid up in ordinary. Iphigénie was moved to Spithead in July. Capt. James A. Worth was in command of her, though she was never commissioned. The Admiralty named her Palma and then renamed her Gloire on 8 November. She was sold in September 1817 to a Mr. Freake for £1,750.
