= HMS Talavera (1818) =

Ship of the line of the Royal Navy

- Talavera

History

United Kingdom
- Name: Talavera
- Namesake: Battle of Talavera
- Ordered: 28 January 1814
- Builder: Woolwich Dockyard
- Laid down: July 1814
- Launched: 15 October 1818
- Completed: 7 September 1819
- Commissioned: 15 September 1829
- Decommissioned: 3 January 1840
- Renamed: From Thunderer, 23 July 1817
- Fate: Burnt, 27 September 1840

General characteristics
- Class & type: Repulse-class ship of the line
- Tons burthen: 1,718 18/94 (bm)
- Length: 174 ft (53 m) (gundeck)
- Beam: 48 ft 3 in (14.7 m)
- Draught: 16 ft 10 in (5.1 m) (light)
- Depth of hold: 20 ft (6.1 m)
- Sail plan: Full-rigged ship
- Complement: 590
- Armament: 74 muzzle-loading, smoothbore guns; Gundeck: 28 × 32 pdr guns; Upper deck: 28 × 18 pdr guns; Quarterdeck: 2 × 18 pdr guns + 12 × 32 pdr carronades; Forecastle: 2 × 18 pdr guns + 2 × 32 pdr carronades; Poop deck: 6 × 18 pdr carronades

HMS Talavera was a 74-gun third-rate Repulse-class ship of the line built for the Royal Navy in the 1810s. Completed in 1819, she was in ordinary until 1829 when she was commissioned for service as a guard ship.

== Description ==
Talavera measured 174 feet (53 m) on the gundeck and 143 feet 2 inches (43.6 m) on the keel. She had a beam of 48 feet 3 inches (14.7 m), a depth of hold of 20 feet (6.1 m) and had a tonnage of 1,718 18/94 tons burthen. The ship's draught was 12 feet (3.7 m) forward and 16 feet 10 inches (5.1 m) aft at light load; fully loaded, her draught would be significantly deeper. The Repulse-class ships were armed with 74 muzzle-loading, smoothbore guns that consisted of twenty-eight 32-pounder guns on her lower gundeck and twenty-eight 18-pounder guns on her upper gundeck. Their forecastle mounted a pair of 18-pounder guns and two 32-pounder carronades. On their quarterdeck they carried two 18-pounders and a dozen 32-pounder carronades. Above the quarterdeck was their poop deck with half-a-dozen 18-pounder carronades. Their crew numbered 590 officers and ratings. The ships were fitted with three masts and ship-rigged.

== Construction and career ==
HMS Talavera was the first ship of her name to serve in the Royal Navy. She was ordered on 28 January 1814 under the name Thunderer as part of the third batch of three Repulse-class ships of the line designed by Sir William Rule, co-Surveyor of the Navy. The ship incorporated co-Surveyor of the Navy Robert Seppings' new interlocking, diagonal truss system when she was laid down at Woolwich Dockyard in July and was renamed Talavera on 23 July 1817. She was launched on 15 October 1818. She was completed at Chatham Dockyard for ordinary by 7 September 1819 and was roofed over before she was sailed to Sheerness. Talavera was commissioned by Captain Hugh Pigot on 15 September 1829 and converted into a guard ship between September and February 1830.

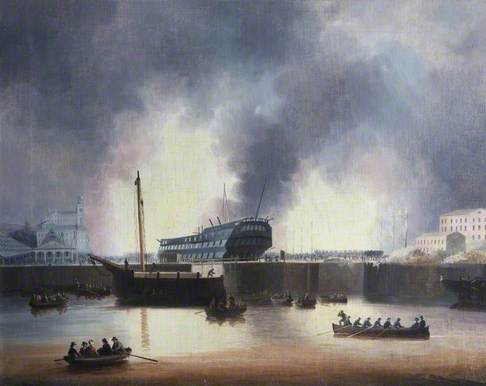
The fire on the morning of 27 September, which destroyed Talavera and threatened to destroy Devonport Dockyard.

She was destroyed in 1840 at Devonport dockyard in a large scale fire on 25 September 1840, which started in the North Dock. Talavera and Imogene were completely gutted, the fire spread to HMS Minden whose fire was successfully put out, and to nearby buildings and equipment. Estimates for the damage were put at £150,000 in then money, and would have totalled £500,000 had the fire not been contained.
