= Jean-Baptiste-Augustin Rousseau =

French naval officer

Jean-Baptiste-Augustin Rousseau (Note: Often "Augustin Rousseau"; not to be confused with Louis Rousseau, also a frigate commander in the French navy at the same period (e.g.: Troude, op. cit., p. 113).) (? – 10 February 1809) was a French naval officer.

== Career ==
In September 1793, Rousseau ranked enseigne de vaisseau non entretenu, and was in command of the aviso Espérance.

On 16 September 1794, he was appointed to command the 14-gun lugger Écureuil.

In 1796, Rousseau, then a Lieutenant, took command of Écureuil to escort shipping from Bénodet to Audierne. On 24 April, he fought against boats from HMS Niger. Écureuil was beached at Guilvinec and set afire.

In late 1799, Rousseau was appointed in command of the corvette Intrépide (Note: Roche (opc. cit., p. 254) states that Intrépide was actually a pink commissioned in the Navy, and not a corvette in the sense of the type of ship.) in Cadix.

In 1801, Rousseau was in command of the schooner Tricolore, in Nantes. On 23 September, he received command of the corvette Vésuve, in Le Havre, which he retained until 26 November 1802.

In the summer of 1804, Rousseau was in command of the gunboat Etna, stationed in Le Havre, and tasked with escort duties. Later in the year, he was promoted to Commander and put in charge of the harbour of Ambleteuse.

In late 1808, Rousseau commanded the 44-gun Amazone. In early 1809, Rousseau took command of the Revanche, which he sailed from Trieux to Saint-Malo. On 20 June, the 74-gun Duguesclin was launched at Antwerp, and Rousseau was tasked to sail her on the Escaut River to Vlissingen.

Junon for a cruise from Le Havre to Cherbourg, and then ferrying troops from Cherbourg to Basse-Terre. On 20 December, he fought the British 18-gun corvette HMS St Christopher, but did not give chase for fear of lacking wind and exposing himself to the British blockade. Junon arrived at the Saintes in mid-January, and departed on 7 February. The next day, she was detected by the brigs HMS Asp and Supérieure, who shadowed Junon and harassed her. The cannonade attracted the attention of the frigates HMS Latona and Horatio, who gave chase and started the action of 10 February 1809. Rousseau was shot through the chest, and relinquished command of Junon to Lieutenant Jean-Léon Émeric. Mortally wounded, Rousseau died the next day.

== Sources and references ==
=== Bibliography ===
- Roche, Jean-Michel (2005). Dictionnaire des bâtiments de la flotte de guerre française de Colbert à nos jours, 1671 - 1870. Group Retozel-Maury Millau. p. 344. ISBN 978-2-9525917-0-6. OCLC 165892922.
- Fonds Marine. Campagnes (opérations; divisions et stations navales; missions diverses). Inventaire de la sous-série Marine BB4. Tome premier : BB4 1 à 482 (1790-1826)
- Fonds Marine. Campagnes (opérations; divisions et stations navales; missions diverses). Inventaire de la sous-série Marine BB4. Tome deuxième : BB4 1 à 482 (1790-1826)
- Troude, Onésime-Joachim (1867). Batailles navales de la France. Vol. 3. Challamel ainé. pp. 160–162.
- Troude, Onésime-Joachim (1867). Batailles navales de la France. Vol. 4. Challamel ainé. pp. 160–162.
- James, William (2002) [1827]. The Naval History of Great Britain, Volume 1, 1793–1796. London: Conway Maritime Press. ISBN 0-85177-905-0. OCLC 165702223.
