= USS Frolic (1813) =

Sloops-of-war of the United States Navy

History

United States
- Name: USS Frolic
- Namesake: HMS Frolic, a prize taken in the early part of the War of 1812
- Builder: Josiah Barker, Charlestown, Massachusetts
- Cost: $72,095
- Launched: 11 September 1813
- Fate: Captured 20 April 1814

United Kingdom
- Name: Florida
- Acquired: By capture 20 April 1814
- Fate: Broken up May 1819

General characteristics
- Type: Sloop-of-war
- Tonnage: 509 tons
- Tons burthen: 53911/94 (bm)
- Length: 119 ft 6 in (36.42 m)
- Beam: 31 ft 6 in (9.60 m)
- Depth: 14 ft 2 in (4.32 m)
- Propulsion: Sails
- Complement: American Service: 170; British Service: 135
- Armament: American service; 20 × 32-pounder carronades; 2 × 12-pounder guns; British service; 18 × 32-pounder carronades; 2 × 12-pounder guns

USS Frolic was a sloop-of-war that served in the United States Navy in 1814. The British captured her later that year and she served in the Royal Navy in the Channel and the North Sea until she was broken up in 1819.

== Construction ==
Frolic was one of a class of three heavy flush-decked sloops of war, designed by William Doughty and constructed late in the War of 1812. Her sister ships were USS Peacock and USS Wasp. Frolic was launched on 11 September 1813 by Josiah Barker at Charlestown, Massachusetts.

== United States service ==
Frolic first put to sea on 18 February 1814 with Commander Joseph Bainbridge (younger brother of Commodore William Bainbridge) in command, standing out of President Roads in Boston Harbor at Boston, Massachusetts, for a cruise in the West Indies.

On 29 March 1814 she destroyed a British merchant ship, and later on the same day she sank an unnamed Spanish-American privateer, sailing from Cartagena in present-day Colombia. Frolic prevailed in a brief action in which nearly 100 of the privateer's crew drowned. (Privateers from several countries seeking independence from Spain were preying on ships of all nations in the Caribbean.)

Frolic sank another British merchant ship on 3 April 1814. (This may have been Little Fox.)

While in the Florida Strait on 20 April 1814, Frolic encountered the British 36-gun frigate HMS Orpheus and 12-gun schooner HMS Shelburne. Frolic beat away to southward, making for the coast of Cuba as the two British ships gave chase. Frolic's men labored to lighten their ship, cutting away the starboard anchor, and casting overboard the guns mounted on her port (lee) side and small arms. Overtaken after six hours, Frolic was forced to surrender to the superior British force when about 15 miles off Matanzas, Cuba. (Note: A second-class share, i.e., the share of the lieutenant commanding Shelburne, of one-quarter of the prize money was worth £45 12s 4d; a sixth-class share, that of an ordinary seaman, of one-quarter of the prize money was worth £1 6s 1d.)

== British service ==
After her capture, the Admiralty purchased Frolic for £8,211 1s 7d and took her into service as the post ship HMS Florida. She was commissioned in June at Halifax under Captain Nathaniel Mitchell. She arrived at Woolwich on 30 August 1815. She was recommissioned in September under Captain William Elliot and fitted for Channel service on 22 December.

In April 1816 she sailed for the North Sea under Captain Charles S. J. Hawtayne, where she was employed in searching for and catching smugglers. In February 1818 she was re-rated as a 22-gun sloop.

On 11 May she captured St Thomas, a galley out of Calais with a crew of 12 men. In making the capture, Florida's master's mate, Mr. Kieth Stewart shot and killed one of the smugglers in self-defense. (Note: A first-class share of the prize money was worth £213 11s 2 3/4d; a sixth-class share, that of an ordinary seaman, was worth £2 6s 11 1/4d.)

== Fate ==
She was broken up at Chatham in May 1819.
