= French frigate Alcmène (1811) =

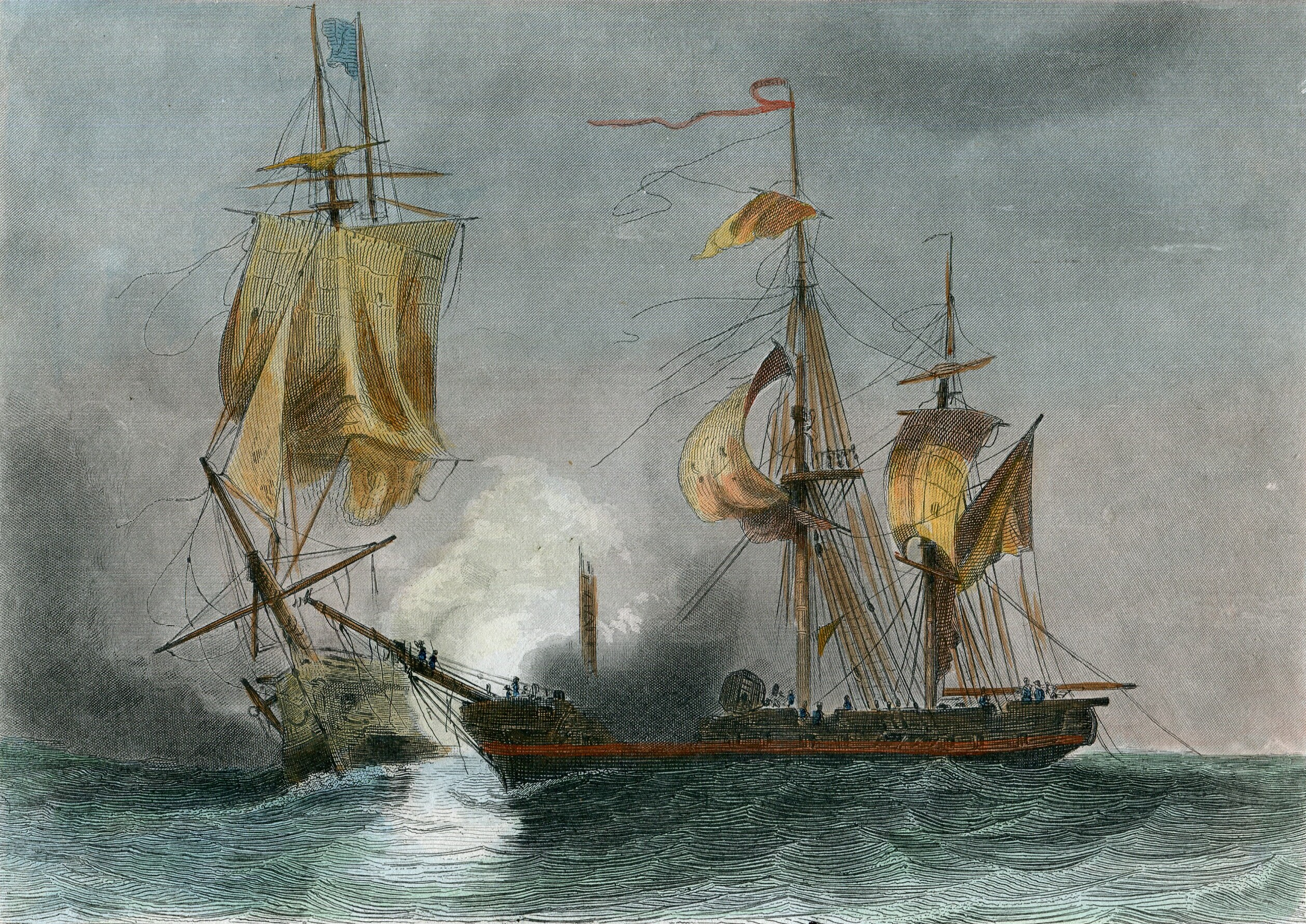
- Alcmène (right) at the action of 16 January 1814

History

France
- Name: Alcmène
- Builder: Cherbourg
- Laid down: July 1810
- Launched: 3 October 1811
- Captured: 16 January 1814

United Kingdom
- Name: Dunira
- Acquired: 16 January 1814 (by capture)
- Renamed: HMS Immortalite
- Fate: Sold 1837

General characteristics
- Class & type: Armide-class frigate
- Displacement: 1430 tonneaux
- Tons burthen: 759 port tonneaux; 107978/94 (bm)
- Length: Overall: 152 ft 8 in (46.53 m); Keel: 127 ft 11 3/8 in (39.0 m)
- Beam: 39 ft 10 in (12.14 m)
- Depth of hold: 12 ft 7 1/2 in (3.848 m)
- Propulsion: Sails
- Complement: French service:320; British service:315
- Armament: French service: 28 × 18-pounder and 8 × 12-pounder guns + 4 × 36-pounder obusiers; British service, though it is not clear she was ever rearmed; UD:28 × 18-pounder guns; QD:14 × 32-pounder carronades; Fc:2 × 9-pounder guns + 2 × 32-pounder carronades

Alcmène was a 44-gun Armide-class frigate of the French Imperial Navy launched in 1811. The Royal Navy captured her in the action of 16 January 1814, and renamed the ship as HMS Dunira and then HMS Immortalite but never commissioned her nor fitted her for sea. In March 1822 she became a receiving ship at Portsmouth. She was sold in January 1837. In 1813, along with Iphigénie, she served at Cherbourg, in the squadron of Counter-admiral Amable Troude, to protect the harbour.

== Capture ==
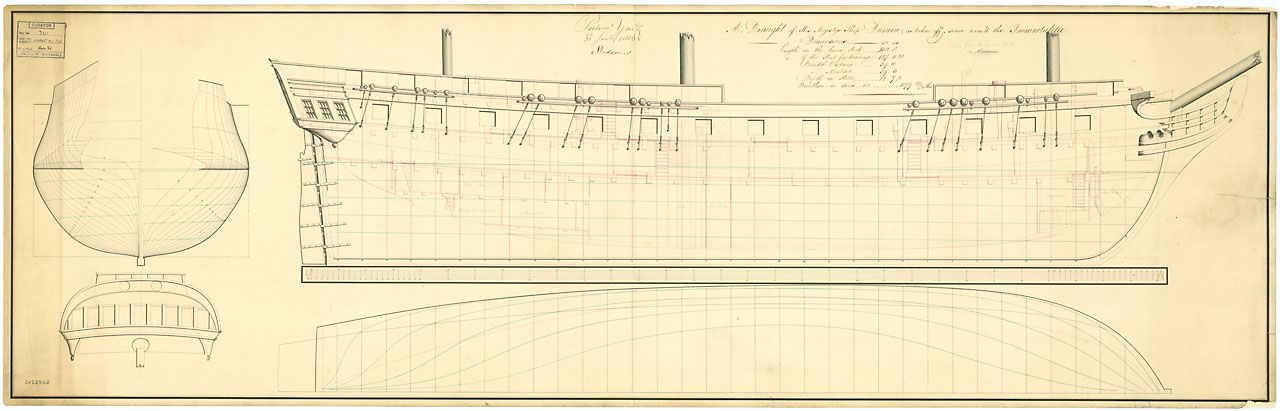
Plan of the Immortalite

On 16 January 1814, the 74-gun third-rate ship of the line Venerable, her prize, the ex-French letter of marque brig Jason, and Cyane were in company when they spotted two 44-gun French frigates, Alcmène and Iphigénie. Venerable joined her and after a chase that left Cyane far behind, captured Alcmène, though not without a fight. Venerable lost two men dead and four wounded, while the French lost 32 dead and 50 wounded. Alcmène had a complement of 319 men under the command of Commander Ducrest de Villeneuve, who was wounded when he brought her alongside Venerable and attempted a boarding.

Jason and Cyane tracked Iphigénie and initially fired on her but broke off the engagement because they were outgunned. Cyane continued the chase for over three days until Venerable was able to rejoin the fight after having sailed 153 miles in the direction she believed that Iphigénie had taken. On 20 January 1814, Venerable captured Iphigénie, having again left Cyane behind. Iphigénie apparently did not resist after Venerable came up. (Note: A first-class share of the prize money for both vessels, including head money for Alcmène, was £819 16s 4½d; a sixth-class share, that of an ordinary seaman, for Alcmène, was worth £3 9s 4d.) Before meeting up with the British ships, the two French vessels had taken some eight prizes. The action resulted in the award in 1847, to any surviving claimants, of the Naval General Service Medal with clasps "Venerable 16 Jany 1814" and "Cyane 16 Jany. 1814".

Venerable was able to locate Iphigénie because Commander Ducrest de Villeneuve of Alcmène was so angry at Captain Émeric, who was the senior French commander, for not having come alongside Venerable on the other side also to board, that he essentially revealed the rendezvous instructions to Admiral Durham. (Venerable was Durham's flagship). When some prisoners from Iphigénie's crew were brought on Venerable, crew from Alcmène too were enraged. Durham had to station Royal Marines between them, with fixed bayonets, to prevent fighting from breaking out.

== Fate ==
The Royal Navy never commissioned Alcmène. The Admiralty initially named her Dunira. On 8 July, Lieutenant Edward Boys, formerly of Venerable, was confirmed in command of Dunira, but was put on half-pay in September. Then on 8 November the Admiralty renamed her Immortalite.

Immortalite became a receiving ship at Portsmouth in March 1822. She may have served for a while in the Quarantine Service at Standgate Creek. She was sold in January 1837 to a Mr. W. Goldsworthy for £1,610.
