= HMS Cyane (1806) =

Royal Navy post ship (1806–1836)

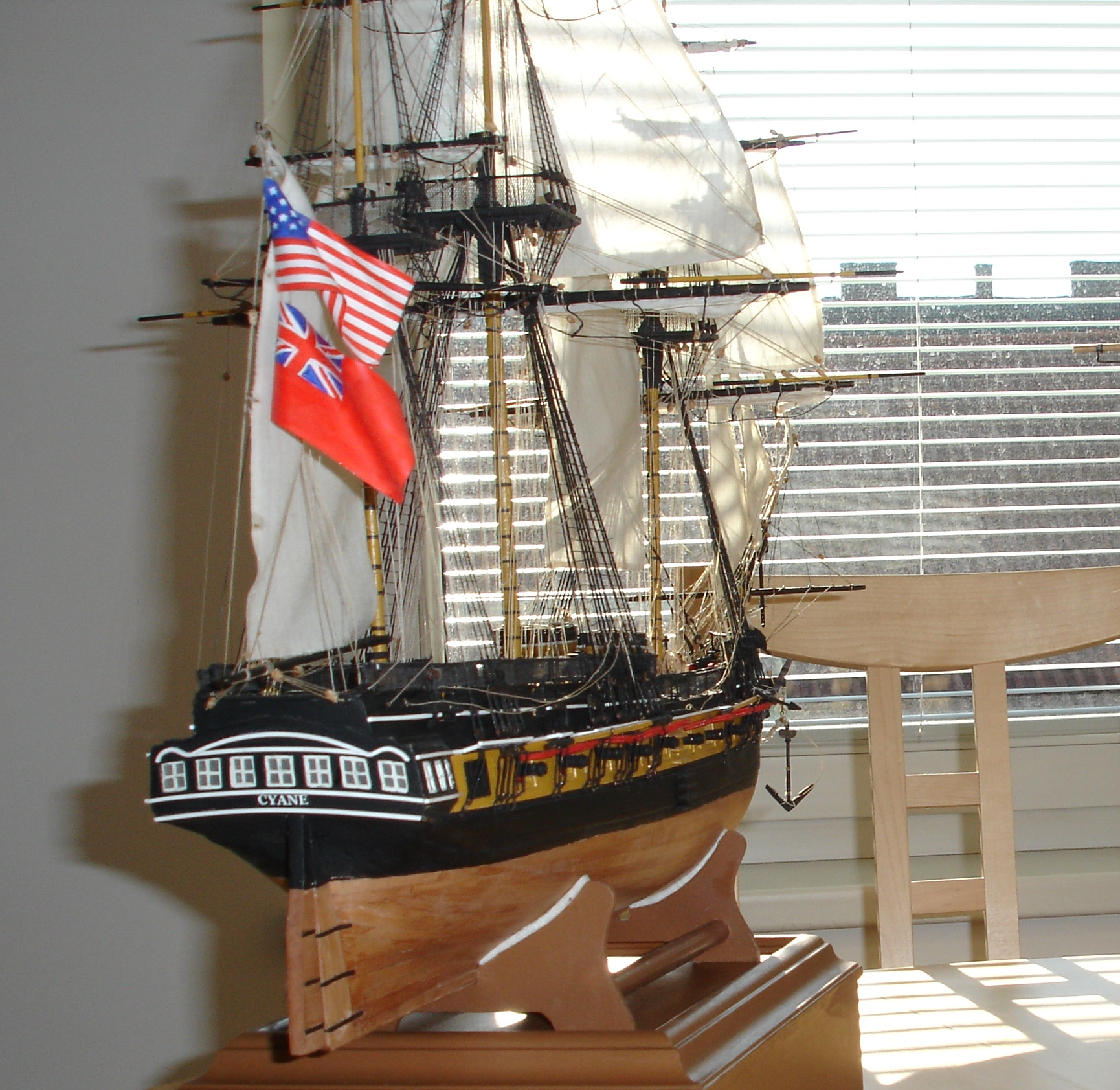
- HMS Cyane from stern

History

United Kingdom
- Name: HMS Cyane
- Ordered: 30 January 1805
- Builder: John Bass, Topsham, Exeter
- Laid down: August 1805
- Launched: 14 October 1806
- Completed: 13 July 1807
- Commissioned: March 1807
- Honours and awards: Naval General Service Medal with clasps: "Cyane 25–27 June 1809"; "Cyane 16 Jany. 1814"
- Captured: 20 February 1815

United States
- Name: USS Cyane
- Acquired: By capture, 20 February 1815
- Commissioned: 1815
- Decommissioned: 1827
- Fate: Broken up, 1836

General characteristics
- Class & type: 22-gun Banterer-class sixth-rate post ship
- Tons burthen: 53939/94 (bm)
- Length: 118 ft 2 in (36.0 m) (overall); 98 ft 7 1/4 in (30.1 m) (keel)
- Beam: 32 ft 0 1/2 in (9.8 m)
- Depth of hold: 10 ft 6 in (3.2 m)
- Sail plan: Full-rigged ship
- Complement: British service: 155 (later 175); US Service: 180
- Armament: British service; Upper deck: 22 × 9-pounder guns (later replaced by 22 × 32-pounder carronades); QD: 6 × 18-pounder guns; Fc: 2 × 6-pounder chase guns + 2 × 18-pounder guns; US Service; Upper deck: 20 × 32-pounder carronades; QD: 8 × 18-pounder carronades; Fc: 4 × 12-pounder guns

HMS Cyane was a Royal Navy Banterer-class sixth-rate post ship of nominally 22 guns, built in 1806 at Topsham, near Exeter, England. She was ordered in January 1805 as HMS Columbine but renamed Cyane on 6 December of that year. Cyane had a distinguished career in British service that included the award in 1847 of a clasp to the Naval General Service Medal to any still surviving crew members of either of two actions. On 20 February 1815, she and HMS Levant engaged USS Constitution; outgunned, both had to surrender. She then served as USS Cyane, including a stint on anti-slavery duties, until she was broken up in 1836.

== Commissioning and early service ==
Cyane was originally named Columbine, but was renamed on 6 December 1805. She initially mounted 22 long 9-pounder cannon on her main deck and also eight 24-pounder carronades and two long 6-pounders on her quarter-deck and forecastle. Captain Thomas Staines commissioned her in March 1807. At his request the Navy Board exchanged her 9-pounders for 32-pounder carronades. Staines added a further two brass howitzers to her armament. The Board also increased her complement by twenty to 175 officers, men and boys.

In 1807, Cyane took part in the operations off Copenhagen in September 1807. After the Danish navy surrendered, Cyane participated in the blockade of Zealand. Then on 30 November she, Vanguard, and several other British warships escorted a convoy of merchant vessels from Helsingborg back to Britain. On 8 December, Cyane was in company with Vanguard, Tigress, and the hired armed cutter Resolution when they captured the Danish ketch Jeltzomine den Roske.

== Mediterranean service ==
On 23 February 1808, Cyane sailed for the Mediterranean. There her boats captured eight merchantmen before, on 22 May, she captured the letter of marque Medusa while cruising of Mallorca. Medusa was armed with 12 guns and had a crew of 80 men. Medusa was the last Spanish ship that the British captured before Spain turned against Napoleon.

On 3 June 1808, Staines received a letter from the Captain-General of the Balearic Isles that the citizens of Mallorca had declared their allegiance to Ferdinand VII and wished to begin talks with the British. Staines sailed to Palma where he received a most cordial welcome. Staines then notified Rear Admiral Thornbrough who sent Sir Francis Laforey in Apollo to negotiate with the Supreme Junta. Cyane spent the next ten months patrolling Spain's south coast to harass French shore batteries and shipping.

=== 1809 ===
Cyane then transferred to the command of Rear Admiral George Martin, who was in command of British naval forces on the Naples station. On 8 May 1809, Cyane captured a bombard and drove another vessel ashore near Naples. (Note: Bombard usually means a bomb vessel but can also mean a type of merchant vessel. In this case we have no information as to the appropriate meaning.)

Two days later, Cyane and Alceste sank two gunboats that were escorting a French convoy at Terracina. Then, on 14 and 15 May, the two British vessels raided a depot near the promontory of Monte Circello, which itself is near the Pontine Marshes and Terracina. There they brought off as much wood as the two ships could carry. Whilst the ships were loading the timber, a sergeant, two corporals, and 20 privates came on board, deserters from the French Army.

Next, Staines captured three Martello towers, each mounting two heavy guns. On 17 May Staines personally came up on the inattentive garrison of the first tower and through an interpreter informed them that he had placed powder against the tower and that he would blow them up if they did not surrender. When the French soldiers made sounds suggesting they were preparing to resist, he fired a musket through the keyhole; the frightened garrison immediately surrendered. He then took the commander from that tower to another tower to persuade its garrison too to surrender. The garrison did surrender and Staines had both towers blown up. He then captured and destroyed a third tower, all without any casualties to Cyane.

On 26 May Cyane arrived at Milazzo in north-west Sicily where she met up with Admiral Martin in HMS Canopus, who was gathering a fleet. The whole force sailed from Milazzo. Canopus, Spartiate, Warrior, Cyane, and Espoir, together with transports and the like, some 133 vessels in all, sailed on 11 June to the coast of Calabria. On 15 June, Alceste, two Sicilian frigates, and some 90 or so transports from Palermo joined them. The aim of the expedition was to attack the islands of Ischia and Procida.

On 20 June Cyane sailed south with Espoir and 12 Sicilian gunboats to patrol between Procida and Cape Miseno. Their assignment was to intercept French reinforcements attempting to reach the islands.

Then on 24 June, Cyane began what turned out to be several days of action. First, she drove 12 gunboats, each armed with a 24-pounder gun, into the Bay of Pozzuoli. She also cut out from under different shore batteries two polacres, one carrying troops to reinforce Procida. The following morning the French 42-gun frigate Cérès, the 28-gun corvette Fama, and a division of gunboats attempted to come out of the bay and force their way to Naples. Cyane and consorts drove them back after an hour-long ineffectual exchange of fire.

At daylight on 26 June, the British spotted 47 enemy vessels and Martin sent Cyane, Espoir, and a flotilla of gunboats to block them from entering the harbour at Naples. The British Anglo-Sicilian force was able to capture 18 heavy gunboats, destroy four, and dispose of 15 other armed vessels, forcing the remainder to turn away. In all, Cyane and her Anglo-Sicilian allies cost the French 37 vessels.

However, during this action, shore batteries subjected Cyane to three hours of bombardment that not only put 23 large shot into her hull but cost her two men killed and seven wounded, one of them mortally. That afternoon, fifteen French soldiers at a battery on Point Mesino hoisted a flag of truce. They surrendered to boats from Cyane, which then spiked their four 42-pounder guns and destroyed the carriages. The French deserters left with boats. That evening Cyane fired into the French vessels at anchor in Pozzuoli Bay.

On the morning of 27 June, Cyane came to be becalmed under another battery, this one of eight 42-pounder guns, two 10-inch mortars and two howitzers. After two hours of enduring their harassing fire, Staines was fed up and led a landing party that succeeded in spiking the guns and throwing the mortars into the sea, all without British casualties.

That evening, Cyane again engaged Cérès, Fama, and the French gunboats for one and a half hours before having to break off the fight as she was running out of powder and both Cyane and Cérès were getting too close to the mole at Naples. (Fama took the opportunity to escape to Naples.)

Staines and his two lieutenants were wounded in the action, Staines losing his arm, and one of the lieutenants dying the following summer while at home. Cyane lost two killed, as well as 17 more men wounded; the French acknowledged losing 50 men killed and wounded. Cyane was so damaged by the three days of fighting that Admiral Lord Collingwood ordered her home for a refit. Cyane arrived back in Britain on 16 October.

Staines was knighted on 6 December. His Majesty Ferdinand the Fourth, King of the Two Sicilies, conferred on him the insignia of a Knight Commander of the Royal Sicilian Order of St. Ferdinand and of Merit. A group of leading citizens of the Isle of Thanet honoured Staines with a dinner at Margate and presented him with a sword. In 1847 all surviving members of the crew of Cyane that had served between 25 and 27 June received the Naval General Service Medal with clasp "Cyane 25–27 June 1809".

In October 1809 Captain Valentine Collard replaced Staines.

=== 1810 ===
On 23 January 1810, Cyane sailed with convoy for South America. Collard's replacement in May was Captain Edward Pelham Brenton.

== Francis Collier ==
Captain Francis Collier served as captain of Cyane from 3 September 1810 until February 1812. He served with her in the Mediterranean, the Channel and the West Indies.

In December 1810 Collier volunteered Cyane's boats to assist those of Diana in boarding and setting fire to the French frigate Elize which had run aground at Tatihou island while attempting to escape from La Hogue. Captain Charles Grant of Diana declined the assistance, preferring stealth over force. The British succeeded in boarding and setting fire to Elize without suffering any losses despite fire from shore batteries and nearby French brigs.

In early 1812, a seaman named Oakey struck Collier. The subsequent court martial sentenced Oakey to death. His plea for a stay of execution was denied, and every ship in port sent a boat of seamen to witness the hanging. Oakey came on deck with his arms tied behind him, attended by the Chaplain. However, after the sentence of the Court Martial had been read Captain Hall produced a letter from the Prince Regent that, at Collier's request, commuted Oakey's sentence to transportation. The reprieve stunned Oakey, who fell on his knees and wept.

== Thomas Forrest ==
From May 1812, Cyane was under Captain Thomas Forrest, and on the Jamaica station. On 11 July she captured the French privateer Serene, bound to New Orleans. In September she captured three American ships, for which he received 29/30ths of the value: Morningstar (8 September), Peru (15 September), and Whim (18 September). At the end of the month, on the 28th, Cyane was in company with Southampton, captured the American ship Hamilton, (Note: A first-class share of 29/30ths of the value was worth £61 12s 9d; a sixth-class share was worth 9s 8d.) Cyane received the portion due to the seizors of the value of the Del Carmen, which Cyane seized at Jamaica on 24 October for a breach of the revenue laws.

On 27 January 1813 Cyane captured the American ship Sally.

On 16 January 1814, Cyane was in company with the 74-gun third-rate ship of the line Venerable and her prize, the ex-French letter of marque brig Jason, when Cyane spotted two 44-gun French frigates, Alcmène and Iphigénie. Venerable joined her and after a chase that left Cyane far behind, captured Alcmène after losing two men dead and four wounded, while the French lost 32 dead and 50 wounded. Alcmène had a complement of 319 men under the command of Captain Ducrest de Villeneuve, who was wounded when he brought her alongside Venerable and attempted a boarding.

Jason and Cyane tracked Iphigénie and initially fired on her but broke off the engagement because they were outgunned. Cyane continued the chase for over three days until Venerable was able to rejoin the fight after having sailed 153 miles in the direction she believed that Iphigénie had taken. On 20 January 1814, after a 19-hour chase, or what amounted in all to a four-day chase Iphigénie, Venerable captured the quarry, having again left Cyane behind. In the chase, Iphigénie cast off her anchors and threw her boats overboard in order to try to gain speed. She had a complement of 325 men, under the command of Captain Emerie. She apparently did not resist after Venerable came up. (Note: A first-class share of the prize money for both vessels, including head money for Alcmène, was £819 16s 4½d; a sixth-class share, that of an ordinary seaman, for Iphigénie was worth £2 1s 8¼d. For Alcmène, a sixth-class share was worth £3 9s 4d.) Before meeting up with the British ships, the two French vessels had taken some eight prizes.

The British took Alcmène into service as HMS Dunira, later HMS Immortalite, but as a receiving ship in Portsmouth and never commissioned. Iphigénie became HMS Palma and then HMS Gloire, but she too was never commissioned. She was laid up in ordinary until sold in 1817. The action resulted in the award in 1847, to any surviving claimants, of the Naval General Service Medal with clasp "Cyane 16 Jany. 1814".

In 1814 Captain Gordon Falcon replaced Forrest. On 22 May Cyane and Dauntless were in company when they recaptured the Aeolus. (Note: A first-class share of the salvage, as remitted from Newfoundland, was worth £66 7s 9d; a sixth-class share was worth £1 3s 9d.)

== Cyane vs. USS Constitution ==
On 20 February 1815, Cyane, under the command of Falcon, and the 20-gun Levant, Captain the Honorable George Douglas, were about 100 miles east of Madeira. At about one o'clock in the afternoon Cyane tacked towards a strange vessel and challenged her. When she received no reply she assumed the other to be an American frigate, so made haste towards Levant. The frigate was USS Constitution, which had left Boston on 11 December 1814.

Off Cape Finisterre on 8 February 1815, Charles Stewart of Constitution had learned the Treaty of Ghent had been signed, but realized that before it was ratified, a state of war would still exist. (The U.S. Senate unanimously approved the treaty on 16 February 1815, and President James Madison exchanged ratification papers with a British diplomat in Washington on 17 February; the treaty was proclaimed on 18 February.)

Although he knew they were outgunned, Douglas decided to fight in the hope of disabling Constitution sufficiently to save two valuable convoys that had sailed from Gibraltar a few days back in company with the two British ships.

Just after 6 o'clock Cyane got on the port bow of Constitution, while Levant got on the port quarter. Cyane and Levant exchanged a series of broadsides with Constitution for about half an hour, but Stewart soon outmaneuvered both of them. After Levant drew off for repairs, he concentrated fire on Cyane. During this time, out of her crew of 145 men and 26 boys, Cyane had six killed and 13 wounded. She also took on five feet of water in her hold and had so much damage to her masts and rigging that she became unmanageable and had to soon strike her colors. (Note: The April/May 1983 issue of American Heritage magazine carried an article "What it was like to be Shot up by Old Ironsides" concerning the discovery of three pages of HMS Cyane's logbook from 13–20 February 1815, with a transcription of 20 February 1815 battle log of Alfred L. Strangeways.)

Constitution's second lieutenant came aboard Cyane as prize master, and Constitution left her to pursue Levant. Levant returned to engage Constitution, but once she saw that Cyane had been defeated she turned and attempted escape. Constitution soon overtook her, and after several more broadsides, she too struck her colors. Out of her 115 men and 16 boys, Levant had six seamen and marines killed and one officer and 14 seamen and marines wounded.

Stewart remained with his new prizes overnight while ordering repairs to all ships. Constitution had suffered little damage in the battle, though it was later discovered she had twelve 32-pound British cannonballs embedded in her hull, none of which had penetrated through. The Americans took their prisoners to St. Jago (Santiago) in the Cape Verde Islands and landed them there, but left in a hurry when British ships were reported. Cyane took one course and Levant took another.

Captain Sir George Collier in Leander caught sight of them off Porto Praya on 11 March and succeeded in recapturing Levant. Cyane successfully escaped recapture; she arrived in the North River on 10 April and anchored near USS Constellation. She was adjudicated by a prize court and purchased by the navy, who renamed her USS Cyane.

Before Collier could pursue Constitution, news reached him that the ratification of the Treaty of Ghent had ended the war.

The subsequent court martial of Falcon, his officers and men for the loss of Cyane took place on board Akbar at Halifax on 28 June 1815. The board acquitted Falcon and the others as they had done their utmost against a much stronger enemy vessel. The court also praised the crew who, with the exception of three men, resisted the American attempts to "wean them from their allegiance, under circumstances of unprecedented severity exercised towards them."

== American service ==
Cyane cruised off the west coast of Africa from 1819 to 1820 and in the West Indies from 1820 to 1821 protecting the Liberian colony and suppressing piracy and the slave trade. In this regard she was a predecessor to the Africa Squadron and the West Indies Squadron.

As recounted in a series of letters distributed by the Philadelphia Gazette, in 1822 the Captain General of Venezuela Jose Tomas Morales issued a decree widely interpreted by the American merchants then in Caracas, La Guaira, and Puerto Cabello as a threat. The Americans solicited the help of Captain Robert T. Spence aboard of the Cyane, was in the area, to delay his departure for Africa to protect them from Morales. Spence complied for several days in October 1822, much to the relief of the Americans, at least briefly. After that She cruised in the Mediterranean during 1824–1825, and on the Brazil Station during 1826–1827.

While she was off Africa under the command of Captain Edward Trenchard, on 5 April 1820, she saw seven vessels. She captured six; one escaped. The six were:

- schooner Dasher, master Thomas Munro, Danish, of St. Eustatius;
- schooner Lorise, master Francoine Sablon, of Matanzas;
- brig La Anita, master A. D. Pedro Puche, of Matanzas;
- schooner Eliza, master Constant Hastings, of Marinico;
- schooner Esperanza, master Lewis Mumford, of Charleston, South Carolina; and
- schooner Endymion, master Alexander M'Kim Andrews, of Baltimore.

Andrews was a midshipman in the US Navy. Trenchard condemned Esperanza and Endymion as prizes as they were in contravention of the US laws forbidding American vessels to engage in the slave trade, but had to let the others go as he felt that he had insufficient grounds to seize them.

Later that month, Lieutenant Silas Horton Stringham of Cyane, took one of the captured vessels, with Trenchard's permission, and captured Plattsburgh (alias Maria Getrudes) and the slave schooner Science. The capture of Plattsburgh gave rise to a US Supreme Court case, with the court finding in favor of her seizure as a slaver, despite a number of subterfuges. Trenchard put Stringham in charge of the four American slave schooners, which he sailed back to New York.

Several notable Americans served aboard Cyane. In 1819 Matthew Calbraith Perry joined her and sailed with her to Liberia. In 1820 President James Monroe had the Secretary of the Navy order Cyane, under the command of Perry, to convoy Elizabeth to Africa with the first contingent of freed slaves that the American Colonization Society was resettling there. Of the 86 black emigrants sailing on Elizabeth, only about one-third were men; the rest were wives and children.

Captain Jesse Duncan Elliott took command of Cyane In March 1825 she received as her second lieutenant Uriah P. Levy, a Sephardic Jew who would rise to the rank of commodore in the US Navy. While on Cyane, Levy became very popular after saving the life of an American who had been impressed into the Brazilian Navy. Levy's courageous act so struck the Emperor of Brazil, Dom Pedro I, that he ordered that no U.S. citizen ever again be impressed into the Brazilian Navy. Pedro then offered Levy the rank of captain in the Imperial Brazilian Navy. Levy declined, stating, "I would rather serve as a cabin boy in the United States Navy than hold the rank of Admiral in any other service in the world."

== Fate ==
Cyane was laid up at the Philadelphia Navy Yard where she sank in 1835. She was raised and broken up the following year. Her captured ensign was on display at Mahan Hall at the U.S. Naval Academy, but was removed on 27 February 2018 for preservation.
