= HMS Venerable (1808) =

Ship of the line of the Royal Navy

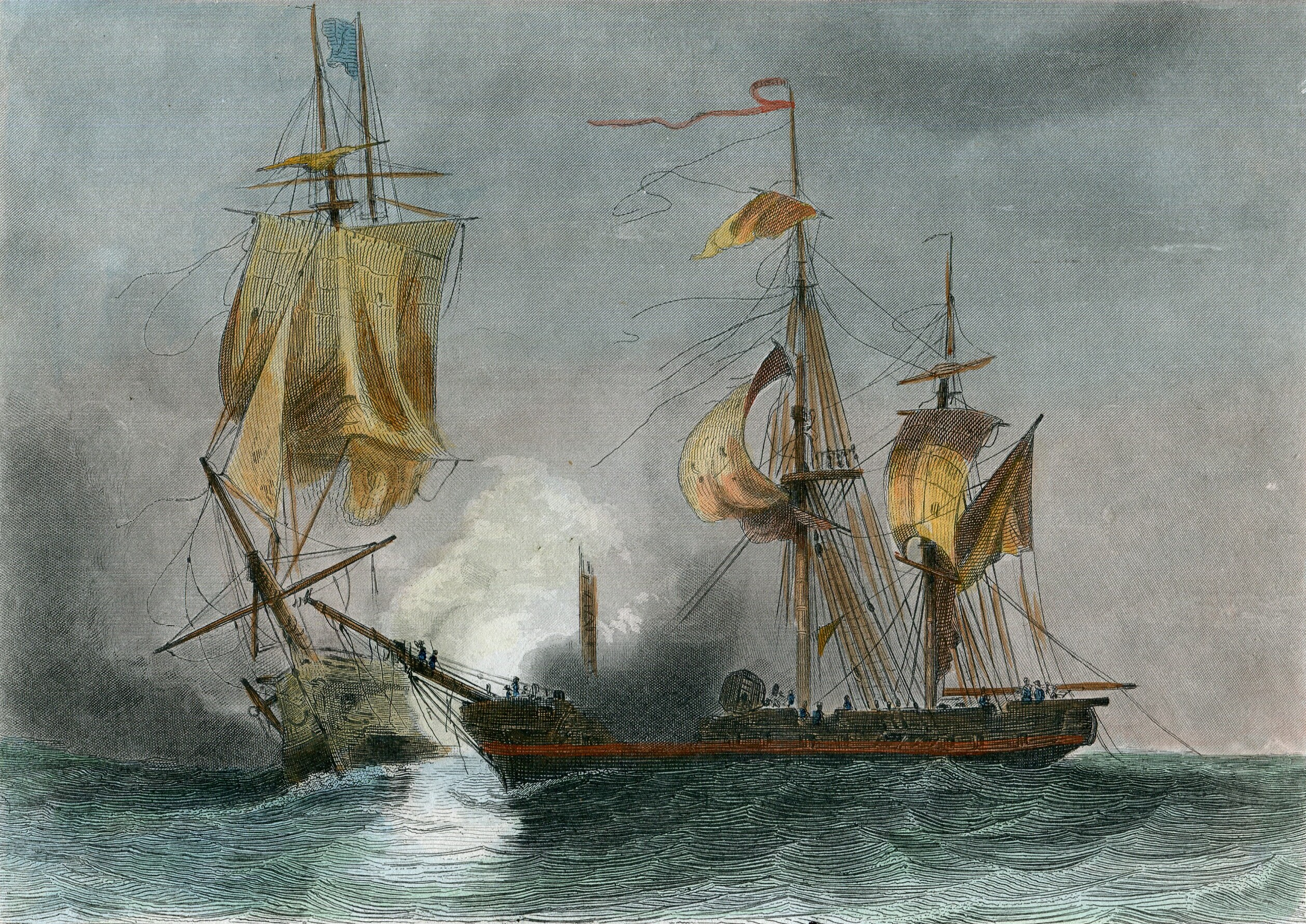
- Venerable (left) at the action of 16 January 1814

History

United Kingdom
- Name: Venerable
- Ordered: 31 January 1805
- Builder: Pitcher, Northfleet
- Laid down: December 1805
- Launched: 12 April 1808
- Commissioned: May 1808
- Decommissioned: 1815
- Reclassified: As a church ship, October 1825
- Honours and awards: Naval General Service Medal with clasp; "Venerable 16 Jany. 1814"
- Fate: Broken up, October 1838

General characteristics
- Class & type: Repulse-class ship of the line
- Tons burthen: 1,715 61/94 (bm)
- Length: 171 ft 2 in (52.2 m) (gundeck)
- Beam: 47 ft 5 in (14.5 m)
- Draught: 17 ft 4 in (5.3 m) (light)
- Depth of hold: 20 ft (6.1 m)
- Sail plan: Full-rigged ship
- Complement: 590
- Armament: 74 muzzle-loading, smoothbore guns; Gundeck: 28 × 32 pdr guns; Upper deck: 28 × 18 pdr guns; Quarterdeck: 2 × 18 pdr guns + 12 × 32 pdr carronades; Forecastle: 2 × 18 pdr guns + 2 × 32 pdr carronades; Poop deck: 6 × 18 pdr carronades

HMS Venerable was a 74-gun third-rate Repulse-class ship of the line built for the Royal Navy in the first decade of the 19th century. Completed in 1808, she played a minor role in the Napoleonic Wars participating in the Walcheren Campaign in 1809. The ship often served as a flagship.

== Description ==
Venerable measured 174 feet 1 inch (53.1 m) on the gundeck and 143 feet 5 inches (43.7 m) on the keel. She had a beam of 47 feet 5 inches (14.5 m), a depth of hold of 20 feet (6.1 m) and had a tonnage of 1,715 61/94 tons burthen. The ship's draught was 12 feet 9 inches (3.9 m) forward and 17 feet 4 inches (5.3 m) aft at light load; fully loaded, her draught would be significantly deeper. The Repulse-class ships were armed with 74 muzzle-loading, smoothbore guns that consisted of twenty-eight 32-pounder guns on her lower gundeck and twenty-eight 18-pounder guns on her upper gundeck. Their forecastle mounted a pair of 18-pounder guns and two 32-pounder carronades. On their quarterdeck they carried two 18-pounders and a dozen 32-pounder carronades. Above the quarterdeck was their poop deck with half-a-dozen 18-pounder carronades. Their crew numbered 590 officers and ratings. The ships were fitted with three masts and ship-rigged.

== Construction and career ==
Vewnerable was the second ship of her name to serve in the Royal Navy. She was ordered on 24 January 1805 from Thomas Pitcher as part of the second batch of five Repulse-class ships of the line designed by Sir William Rule, co-Surveyor of the Navy. The ship was laid down at his shipyard in Northfleet in December and was launched on 12 April 1808. She was commissioned by Captain Home Popham in May and completed later that year.

On 13 December 1810 Venerable was in company with the hired armed cutter Nimrod and several other vessels at the capture of Goede Trouw.

On 12 March 1812, as the merchant ship Ramoncita was returning from Lima and Cadiz, the French privateer Amelia captured her. However, HMS Virago recaptured Ramoncita. The salvage money notice stated that Virago had been in company with Venerable, Cumberland, Elizabeth, and Plantagenet.

On 31 December 1813, she captured the French letter of marque brig Jason which became HMS Jason. Jason, of 264 tons (bm), was pierced for 22 guns but carried 14, 12 of which she had thrown overboard when Venerable chased her. She had left Bordeaux five days earlier and was sailing for New York with a cargo of silks, wines, and other articles of merchandise. There were 64 people on board, ten of whom were passengers. She was on her maiden voyage, copper-bottomed, and sailed so well, Captain Worth took her under protection, intending to go to Barbados.

Venerable was Admiral Durham's flagship when on 16 January 1814, Venerable and her prize Jason, were in company with Cyane. Cyane spotted two 44-gun French frigates, Alcmène and Iphigénie and signaled to Venerable. Venerable joined her and after a chase that left Cyane far behind, captured Alcmène, though not without a fight. Venerable lost two men dead and four wounded, while the French lost 32 dead and 50 wounded. Alcmène had a complement of 319 men under the command of Captain Ducrest de Villeneuve, who was wounded when he brought her alongside Venerable and attempted a boarding.

Jason and Cyane tracked Iphigénie and initially fired on her but broke off the engagement because they were outgunned. Cyane continued the chase for over three days until Venerable was able to rejoin the fight after having sailed 153 miles in the direction she believed that Iphigénie had taken. On 20 January 1814, after a 19-hour chase, or what amounted in all to a four-day chase Iphigénie, Venerable captured the quarry, having again left Cyane behind. In the chase, Iphigénie cast off her anchors and threw her boats overboard in order to try to gain speed. She had a complement of 325 men, under the command of Captain Émeric. She apparently did not resist after Venerable came up. (Note: A first-class share of the prize money for both vessels, including head money for Alcmène, was £819 16s 4½d; a sixth-class share, that of an ordinary seaman, for Iphigénie was worth £2 1s 8¼d. For Alcmène, a sixth-class share was worth £3 9s 4d.) Before meeting up with the British ships, the two French vessels had taken some eight prizes. The action resulted in the award in 1847, to any surviving claimants, of the Naval General Service Medal with clasp "Venerable 16 Jany. 1814".

Venerable was able to locate Iphigénie because Commander Ducrest de Villeneuve of Alcmène was so angry at Captain Émeric, who was the senior French commander, for not having come alongside Venerable on the other side also to board, that he essentially revealed the rendezvous instructions to Durham. When some prisoners from Iphigénie's crew were brought on Venerable, crew from Alcmène too were enraged. Durham had to station Royal Marines between them, with fixed bayonets, to prevent fighting from breaking out.

Venerable was Admiral Durham's flagship for the Invasion of Guadeloupe (1815) against the Bonapartist Admiral Linois.

Venerable was converted into a church ship from May to October 1825, and was broken up in 1838.
