= List of shipwrecks in 1814 =

The list of shipwrecks in 1814 includes ships sunk, wrecked or otherwise lost during 1814.

table of contents
1814
Jan	Feb	Mar	Apr
May	Jun	Jul	Aug
Sep	Oct	Nov	Dec
Unknown date

== January ==
=== 1 January ===
List of shipwrecks: 1 January 1814
Ship	State	Description
Felicity	United States	War of 1812: HMS Endymion (Royal Navy), captured Felicity in the Atlantic Ocean. She was set afire and sunk. Felicity was on a voyage from Cádiz, Spain to Boston, Massachusetts.

=== 2 January ===
List of shipwrecks: 2 January 1814
Ship	State	Description
Tartar	United Kingdom	The ship departed from São Miguel Island, Azores for London. No further trace, presumed foundered with the loss of all hands.

=== 3 January ===
List of shipwrecks: 3 January 1814
Ship	State	Description
Ann	United Kingdom	The ship struck the Cockle Sand, in the North Sea and foundered.

=== 4 January ===
List of shipwrecks: 4 January 1814
Ship	State	Description
Bee	United Kingdom	The brig struck the Newcombe Sand, in the North Sea off Lowestoft, Suffolk and foundered with the loss of all hands.
Isabella	Russia	War of the Sixth Coalition: The full-rigged ship was captured and burnt in the Atlantic Ocean (26°N 30°W) by two French frigates.
Tickler	United Kingdom	The ship departed from Newfoundland, British North America for Cádiz, Spain. No further trace, presumed foundered with the loss of all hands.
Wanderer	United Kingdom	War of 1812: The ship was captured in the Atlantic Ocean (approximately 13°N 51°W) by USS President (United States Navy) and was sunk by her. She was on a voyage from London to Jamaica.

=== 5 January ===
List of shipwrecks: 5 January 1814
Ship	State	Description
Argo	United Kingdom	The ship was driven ashore at Gibraltar.
Industry	Netherlands	The ship was wrecked on the Dutch coast. Her crew were rescued by Durham (United Kingdom). Industry was on a voyage from Rotterdam, South Holland, to London, United Kingdom. Industry subsequently refloated and came ashore near Orfordness, Suffolk, on 12 January, where she was wrecked.
Mary Ann	United Kingdom	The ship was driven ashore at Gibraltar. She was on a voyage from Gibraltar to Africa. Mary Ann was subsequently declared a total loss.
Newry	United Kingdom	The ship was driven ashore and damaged in Carlingford Bay. She was later refloated. Newry was on a voyage from Newry, County Antrim, to Lisbon, Portugal.

=== 6 January ===
List of shipwrecks: 6 January 1814
Ship	State	Description
Gottfried Mehn	Sweden	The ship was driven ashore and wrecked near Whitby, Yorkshire, United Kingdom. She was on a voyage from Strömstad to London, United Kingdom.
Hero	United Kingdom	The ship was driven ashore at Theddlethorpe, Lincolnshire. She was on a voyage from South Shields, County Durham, to Great Yarmouth, Norfolk.
Venus	United Kingdom	The ship was driven ashore at Theddlethorpe. She was on a voyage from Hull, Yorkshire to London.

=== 7 January ===
List of shipwrecks: 7 January 1814
Ship	State	Description
Glasgow	United Kingdom	The ship was wrecked near Wick, Caithness, with the loss of a crew member. She was on a voyage from Gothenburg, Sweden to an Irish port.
Jonge Richard	Netherlands	The ship was driven ashore at Mundesley, Norfolk, United Kingdom. She was on a voyage from Rotterdam, South Holland, to Hull, Yorkshire, United Kingdom. She was refloated.

=== 8 January ===
List of shipwrecks: 8 January 1814
Ship	State	Description
Lavinia	United Kingdom	The sloop was wrecked on the Mull of Kintyre, 8 nautical miles (15 km) east of Campbeltown, Argyllshire. Her crew were rescued. She was on a voyage from Newry, County Antrim, to Greenock, Renfrewshire.
Vrouw Elizabeth	Denmark	The galiot was driven ashore north of Robin Hood's Bay, Yorkshire, United Kingdom. Her prize crew and two prisoners were rescued.
Wellington	United Kingdom	The ship ran aground on the Bird Sand, in the North Sea. Her crew were rescued by lifeboat. She was on a voyage from Pictou, Nova Scotia, British North America to Newcastle upon Tyne, Northumberland. Wellington was later refloated and taken in to the River Tyne.
Unnamed	United Kingdom	The galiot was wrecked at "Cardel".
Unnamed	United Kingdom	The sloop was wrecked on the west coast of the Isle of Arran, Argyllshire with the loss of three of her crew.

=== 9 January ===
List of shipwrecks: 9 January 1814
Ship	State	Description
Ackerman	Flag unknown	The ship was driven ashore and wrecked at Sheerness, Kent, United Kingdom.
Edward	United Kingdom	War of 1812: The ship was captured and sunk by USS President (United States Navy). She was on a voyage from London to "La Guyra".

=== 10 January ===
List of shipwrecks: 10 January 1814
Ship	State	Description
Eliza	United Kingdom	The ship was wrecked on the South Bull, in the Irish Sea off the coast of County Dublin. Her crew were rescued. She was on a voyage from Dublin to Wexford.
Frederick	United Kingdom	The ship was wrecked near Wexford. She was on a voyage from Gothenburg, Sweden to Liverpool, Lancashire.
Kitty and Mary	United Kingdom	The ship was driven ashore and wrecked on the west coast of the Isle of Arran, Ayrshire with the loss of three of her four crew. She was on a voyage from Liverpool, Lancashire, to Leith, Lothian.
Ruby	United Kingdom	The ship was wrecked near Wexford. She was on a voyage from Wexford to London.
William and Sally	United Kingdom	The ship was wrecked near Bangor, County Down. Her crew were rescued. She was on a voyage from Harrington, Cumberland, to Belfast, County Antrim.
Four unnamed vessels	United Kingdom	The fishing boats were driven ashore and wrecked, or capsized off Annalong, County Down with the loss of 24 lives.
Several unnamed vessels	United Kingdom	The fishing boats were lost off Warrenpoint, County Down with the loss of at least 40 lives .
Five unnamed vessels	United Kingdom	The ships were wrecked at Kilkeel, County Down.
Two unnamed vessels	United Kingdom	The lighters were driven ashore and wrecked at Plymouth, Devon. Their crews were rescued.

=== 11 January ===
List of shipwrecks: 11 January 1814
Ship	State	Description
Euphemia	United Kingdom	The transport ship was wrecked on the Sunk Sand, in the North Sea off Harwich, Essex. Her crew were rescued.
Expedition	United Kingdom	The ship departed from Cork for London. No further trace, presumed foundered with the loss of all hands.
Felicity	United Kingdom	The ship was wrecked on the Long Sand, in the North Sea off Harwich with the loss of three lives.
Leda	United Kingdom	The ship was driven ashore at "Kelheel". Her crew were rescued. She was on voyage from Belfast, County Antrim, to Swansea, Glamorgan.

=== 12 January ===
List of shipwrecks: 12 January 1814
Ship	State	Description
John	United Kingdom	The ship was wrecked on the Black Middens, in the North Sea off the coast of County Durham. Her crew were rescued by the Shields Lifeboat. She was on a voyage from Heligoland to Hull, Yorkshire.
Mary	United Kingdom	The brig struck rocks and sank at Newcastle upon Tyne, Northumberland. Her crew were rescued by the lifeboat Original (United Kingdom). Mary was on a voyage from Heligoland to Newcastle upon Tyne.
Unnamed	Netherlands	The schuyt was driven ashore and wrecked at Orfordness, Suffolk, United Kingdom with the loss of all hands.

=== 13 January ===
List of shipwrecks: 13 January 1814
Ship	State	Description
Margaretta Caterga	Netherlands	The ship was abandoned in the North Sea 13 nautical miles (24 km) off Flamborough Head, Yorkshire, United Kingdom. She was on a voyage from Amsterdam, North Holland, to London, United Kingdom.
Mary	United Kingdom	The ship was driven ashore in the Isles of Scilly. She was on a voyage from Porto, Portugal to Liverpool, Lancashire. Mary was later refloated and taken in to St. Mary's, Isles of Scilly.
Three Friends	United Kingdom	The ship was lost near Kinsale, County Cork. She was on a voyage from Liverpool to Youghall, County Cork.
Richard	United Kingdom	The ship was driven ashore in the Isles of Scilly. She was on a voyage from Chepstow, Monmouthshire to Plymouth, Devon. Richard was refloated in early February and sailed for Plymouth.

=== 14 January ===
List of shipwrecks: 14 January 1814
Ship	State	Description
Arun	United Kingdom	The transport ship was driven ashore and severely damaged at Crookhaven, County Cork.
Dumfries	United Kingdom	War of the Sixth Coalition: The ship was captured by Meduse and Nymphe (French Navy) while on a voyage from Halifax, Nova Scotia, British North America to Tobago. She was set afire and sunk.
Hibernia	United Kingdom	The ship was driven ashore and wrecked at Falmouth, Cornwall.
Jane Barnes	United Kingdom	The ship was driven ashore and damaged at Falmouth.
Lady Warren	United Kingdom	The ship was driven ashore at Falmouth. She was on a voyage from Liverpool, Lancashire, to Lisbon, Portugal.
Mentor	United Kingdom	The ship was lost near Penzance, Cornwall, with the loss of all but one of her crew. She was on a voyage from Martinique to Cork and London.
Montague	Spain	The packet ship was driven ashore in the Isles of Scilly, United Kingdom. Montague was refloated in early February.
Queen	United Kingdom	The transport ship was driven ashore and wrecked at Trefusis Point, Cornwall, with the loss of 369 of the 473 people on board.
Queen Charlotte	United Kingdom	The ship was wrecked off San Sebastián, Spain with the loss of seventeen of her crew.
Samuel	United Kingdom	The packet ship was driven ashore and wrecked at Milford, Pembrokeshire.

=== 15 January ===
List of shipwrecks: 15 January 1814
Ship	State	Description
Hope	United Kingdom	The brig was driven ashore and wrecked on Stornoway. She was on a voyage from Gothenburg, Sweden to Dublin.
London	United Kingdom	The ship capsized at Honduras. She was later righted.
Mary	United Kingdom	The ship foundered in the Atlantic Ocean (approximately 51°N 15°W). She was on a voyage from a Spanish port to Guernsey, Channel Islands.
Providence	United Kingdom	The ship was run ashore near Tenby, Pembrokeshire. She was on a voyage from Minehead, Somerset, to Plymouth, Devon.

=== 16 January ===
List of shipwrecks: 16 January 1814
Ship	State	Description
Queen Charlotte	United Kingdom	The ship was wrecked at San Sebastián, Spain with the loss of seventeen of her crew.

=== 17 January ===
List of shipwrecks: 17 January 1814
Ship	State	Description
Caroline	United Kingdom	The sloop struck a breakwater at Plymouth, Devon, and sank.
Garrett	United Kingdom	The ship foundered in the Irish Sea off Derby Haven, Isle of Man. She was on a voyage from Dublin to Whitehaven, Cumberland.

=== 18 January ===
List of shipwrecks: 18 January 1814
Ship	State	Description
John and Nancy	United Kingdom	The ship was driven ashore at Carlingford, County Louth.
Margaret	United Kingdom	The ship was driven ashore at Carlingford.
Mary	United Kingdom	The ship was driven ashore near Great Yarmouth, Norfolk. Her crew were rescued.
Towry	United Kingdom	The brig was driven ashore at St. Margarets Bay, Kent. She broke up two days later and was a total loss. Towry was on a voyage from Great Yarmouth, Norfolk, to an Irish port.

=== 19 January ===
List of shipwrecks: 19 January 1814
Ship	State	Description
Dygden	United Kingdom	The ship was wrecked near Bilbao, Spain.
George	United Kingdom	The ship was driven ashore at Corton, Suffolk. Her crew were rescued. She was on a voyage from Hull, Yorkshire to the West Indies. George was refloated in May and taken in to Great Yarmouth, Norfolk.
Robert and Ann	United Kingdom	The transport ship was driven ashore and wrecked at Saint-Jean-de-Luz, Basses-Pyrénées, France with the loss of all hands.

=== 20 January ===
List of shipwrecks: 20 January 1814
Ship	State	Description
Argo	United Kingdom	The brig was wrecked near Capbreton, Landes, France.
Britannia	United Kingdom	The transport ship was wrecked near Bordeaux, Gironde, France. Her crew were taken prisoner.
Ceres	United Kingdom	The ship was run down and sunk in the English Channel off The Lizard, Cornwall by Lord Wellington (United Kingdom), which rescued Ceres's crew. Ceres was on a voyage from Dublin to London.
Ceres	United Kingdom	The brig was wrecked near Capbreton.
George	United Kingdom	The ship was driven ashore and wrecked near Corton, Suffolk. Her crew were rescued. She was on a voyage from Hull, Yorkshire to Jamaica.
Lucy	United Kingdom	The ship was driven ashore and wrecked at Omonville, Seine-Inférieure, France. She was on a voyage from Porto, Portugal, to London.
Mary Ann	United Kingdom	The transport ship was wrecked near Saint-Jean-de-Luz, Basses-Pyrénées, France.
Palladium	United Kingdom	The transport ship, a brig, was wrecked near Capbreton.
Sarah Ann	United Kingdom	The ship was wrecked near Capbreton
HMS Savage	Royal Navy	The Seagull-class brig-sloop ran aground at Guernsey, Channel Islands. Later refloated, repaired and returned to service.
Samuel	United Kingdom	The schooner was wrecked near Capbreton.
Venus	United Kingdom	The brig was driven ashore and wrecked at Great Yarmouth, Norfolk. Her crew were rescued by rocket apparatus.
Vittoria	United Kingdom	The ship was driven ashore and wrecked at Vauville, Calvados, France. She was on a voyage from Dublin to London.
Unnamed	United Kingdom	The packet ship was wrecked at Fontarabia, Spain.
Unnamed	United Kingdom	The ship was driven ashore and wrecked between Corton and Great Yarmouth.

=== 21 January ===
List of shipwrecks: 21 January 1814
Ship	State	Description
Bellona	United Kingdom	The transport ship was lost near Brest, Finistère, France with the loss of all but three of her crew. She was on a voyage from Passages to an English port.
Harp	United Kingdom	The ship foundered off Ouessant, Finistère, France. Her crew were rescued by HMS Orestes (Royal Navy). Harp was on a voyage from Cork to "Passages".
Murphy	United Kingdom	War of the Sixth Coalition: The ship was captured in the Atlantic Ocean (47°09′N 8°30′W) by Atalante and Terpsichore (both French Navy). She was set afire and sunk.
Providence	United Kingdom	The ship was lost near Figueira da Foz, Portugal. Her crew were rescued. She was on a voyage from Wexford to Cádiz, Spain.
Thames	United Kingdom	War of the Sixth Coalition: The transport ship was captured and sunk by the privateer Pomone (France).

=== 22 January ===
List of shipwrecks: 22 January 1814
Ship	State	Description
Auguste	France	The privateer, a schooner, was driven ashore on the French coast by HMS Helicon (Royal Navy) with the loss of 109 of her 120 crew.
Betsey	United Kingdom	The ship was driven ashore and wrecked at Saltfleet, Lincolnshire, with the loss of all hands. She was on a voyage from Hull, Yorkshire to Grangemouth, Stirlingshire, and Glasgow, Renfrewshire.
Count Platoff	Russia	The ship was driven ashore at Trusthorpe, Lincolnshire. She was on a voyage from Leith, Lothian, to Passage West, County Cork, and Lisbon, Portugal.
Mars	United Kingdom	The transport ship was lost on the French coast.
Neptune	United Kingdom	The ship was driven ashore and wrecked at Saltfleet.
Sokal	United Kingdom	The ship was driven ashore near Wexford. She was on a voyage from Liverpool, Lancashire, to Havana, Cuba.

=== 24 January ===
List of shipwrecks: 24 January 1814
Ship	State	Description
Aid	United Kingdom	The ship was driven ashore at Porto, Portugal. She was on a voyage from Liverpool, Lancashire, to Porto. Aid was later refloated and taken in to Porto.
Dido	United Kingdom	The ship was lost at Porto.

=== 25 January ===
List of shipwrecks: 25 January 1814
Ship	State	Description
Kate	United Kingdom	The sloop was driven ashore and wrecked in the Cattewater.

=== 27 January ===
List of shipwrecks: 27 January 1814
Ship	State	Description
Active	United Kingdom	The ship was wrecked off Peniche, Portugal with the loss of eight of her crew. She was on a voyage from London to Lisbon, Portugal.
Correio Lisbonere	Portugal	The ship was wrecked on the Bahama Banks. She was on a voyage from Liverpool, Lancashire, United Kingdom to Havana, Cuba.

=== 28 January ===
List of shipwrecks: 28 January 1814
Ship	State	Description
Ceres	United Kingdom	The ship ran aground on the Newcombe Sand, in the North Sea. She was refloated but came ashore at Lowestoft, Suffolk. Her crew were rescued. Ceres was on a voyage from Cowes, Isle of Wight to Sunderland, County Durham.

=== 29 January ===
List of shipwrecks: 29 January 1814
Ship	State	Description
Ann	United Kingdom	The transport ship was lost on the coast of France. She was on a voyage from Quebec City, Lower Canada, British North America to Milford, Pembrokeshire.
Ceres	United Kingdom	The sloop was driven ashore and wrecked near Looe, Cornwall, with the loss of a crew member. She was on a voyage from Looe to a Welsh port.
Chard	United Kingdom	The ship was driven ashore on the French coast. She was later refloated and taken in to Dinan Bay, Finistère. Chard was on a voyage from Dominica to Bristol, Gloucestershire.
Corry	United Kingdom	The packet ship was wrecked on the Hoyle Sandbank, in Liverpool Bay. She was on a voyage from Newry, County Down, to Liverpool, Lancashire.
Governor Milne	United Kingdom	The ship was run ashore on the coast of Jamaica. She was on a voyage from London to the Black River and Savanna-la-Mar, Jamaica. Governor Milne was later refloated.
HMS Holly	Royal Navy	The schooner was driven ashore and wrecked at San Sebastián, Spain with the loss of seven of her crew.
Robert	United Kingdom	The ship was wrecked on the Gunfleet Sand, in the North Sea Her crew were rescued. She was on a voyage from South Shields, County Durham, to London.
Zephyr	United Kingdom	The ship was sighted in the Boston Deeps with only two crew on board. No further trace, presumed foundered. She was on a voyage from Newcastle upon Tyne, Northumberland to London.
Unnamed vessels	United Kingdom	Four or five transport ships were wrecked at San Sebastián.

=== 30 January ===
List of shipwrecks: 30 January 1814
Ship	State	Description
Chard	United Kingdom	The ship was driven ashore on the French coast. She was captured the next day by two privateers and taken in to Audierne, Finistère. Chard was on a voyage from Dominica to Bristol, Gloucestershire.
Coriolanus	United Kingdom	War of the Sixth Coalition: The ship was captured and sunk in the Atlantic Ocean by Cicero and Pallas (both French Navy).
Crawford	United Kingdom	The brig was wrecked near Capbreton, Landes, France.
Unicorn	United Kingdom	The ship was wrecked near Capbreton.
Union	United Kingdom	The ship was lost near Formby, Lancashire, with the loss of all hands. She was on a voyage from the Isle of Man to Liverpool, Lancashire.

=== 31 January ===
List of shipwrecks: 31 January 1814
Ship	State	Description
Neptunus	Portugal	The ship was lost near San Sebastián, Spain.
Roxburgh Castle	United Kingdom	The ship was wrecked off the coast of Mauritius. She was on a voyage from London to the Cape of Good Hope and the Île de France, Mauritius.

=== Unknown date ===
List of shipwrecks: Unknown date in January 1814
Ship	State	Description
Ann	United Kingdom	The ship was driven ashore after 4 January. She was on a voyage from Hull, Yorkshire to London. She was refloated and put back to Hull, where she arrived on 22 January.
Augusta	Prussia	The ship was driven ashore on Saaremaa, Russia. She was on a voyage from Saint Petersburg, Russia to Königsburg. She was refloated and taken in to Zerel, Russia for repairs.
Active	United Kingdom	The ship was wrecked on Alderney, Channel Islands with the loss of all hands. She was on a voyage from the Humber to Cork.
Content	United Kingdom	The snow was wrecked on the Gunfleet Sand, in the North Sea off the coast of Essex.
Eleanor	United Kingdom	War of the Sixth Coalition: The ship was captured and sunk by Alcmène and Iphigénie (both French Navy). Eleanor was on a voyage from London to Jamaica.
Elizabeth & Mary	United Kingdom	The ship was lost on the coast of Pembrokeshire. Her crew were rescued. She was on a voyage from Newport, Monmouthshire, to Hayle, Cornwall.
Enigheten	Flag unknown	The ship was lost in the Tagus in late January. She was on a voyage from Limerick, United Kingdom to Porto, Portugal.
Estafette	Denmark	The schooner, a prize of HMS Clio (Royal Navy), was driven ashore and wrecked at Saltfleet with the loss of at least three lives.
Experiment	Rostock	The ship became waterlogged at sea. She was on a voyage from Leith, Lothian to Liverpool, Lancashire, United Kingdom. She put in to Gourdon Creek, with the intention of going to Montrose, Forfarshire for repairs.
Fame	United Kingdom	The ship was driven ashore on the Crabb. She was on a voyage from Burnt Island, Fife to Rotterdam, South Holland, Netherlands. Fame was refloated in early February and taken in to Dort, South Holland.
Hilton	United Kingdom	The transport ship was wrecked at Bayonne, Basses-Pyrénées, France.
Hippolyta	United Kingdom	The ship was driven ashore on Jamaica. She was refloated with assistance from HMS North Star (Royal Navy).
Hoffnung	Sweden	The ship was driven ashore on the Dutch coast. She was on a voyage from Gothenburg to a Dutch port.
Isabella	United Kingdom	The ship departed from Limerick for Liverpool, Lancashire. No further trace, presumed foundered in the Irish Sea with the loss of all hands.
Jane	United Kingdom	The transport ship was wrecked near Bayonne. She was on a voyage from St. Andero, Spain to Passage West, County Cork.
John and Sarah	United Kingdom	The ship was wrecked in Dundrum Bay with the loss of all hands.
John & Thomas	United Kingdom	The ship was lost near Figueira da Foz, Portugal. She was on a voyage from Cork to Lisbon, Portugal.
Lively	United Kingdom	The ship was wrecked on the French coast.
Louisa	United Kingdom	The ship was run down and sunk by HMS Eurotas (Royal Navy) Her crew were rescued. She was on a voyage from Málaga, Spain to Hull, Yorkshire.
Lovely Mary	United Kingdom	The ship was wrecked on the coast of the Isle of Man with the loss of all hands.
Lucy	United Kingdom	The ship was driven ashore at Sydney, Nova Scotia, British America early in January. She was on a voyage from Cape Breton Island, Nova Scotia to Ayr. Lucy was driven out to sea on 17 February. No further trace, presumed foundered.
Margaret	United Kingdom	The ship was lost near Ramsey, Isle of Man with the loss of four lives.
Maria	United Kingdom	The ship capsized whilst on a voyage from Lisbon to Dublin. Her crew were rescued after three days by William (United Kingdom).
Martha	United Kingdom	War of 1812:The schooner was captured by Privateer America (United States) in the Atlantic Ocean off the British Isles and was scuttled.
Mary	United Kingdom	The ship capsized in the Atlantic Ocean. Her crew were rescued by William (United Kingdom.
May Flower	United Kingdom	The ship was driven ashore and wrecked on the South Ham Sand, in the North Sea off Great Yarmouth, Norfolk. Her crew were rescued.
Meaburn	United Kingdom	The transport ship was wrecked in the Bay of Biscay in early January with the loss of all hands.
Nile	United Kingdom	The transport ship was wrecked at Domesnes, Russia. She was on a voyage from London to Riga, Russia.
Norfolk	United Kingdom	The schooner was lost near Wells-next-the-Sea, Norfolk with the loss of all hands.
Progress	United Kingdom	The ship was driven ashore and wrecked on Saaremaa, Russia. She was on a voyage from Saint Petersburg, Russia to London.
Providence	United Kingdom	The ship was lost on the coast of Pembrokeshire. Her crew were rescued. She was on a voyage from Cardiff, Glamorgan, to London.
Richard	United Kingdom	The ship was wrecked on the coast of Norway. She was on a voyage from Heligoland to Hull. Her crew were rescued, but made prisoners.
Sarah	United Kingdom	The ship was wrecked near Holyhead, Anglesey. She was on a voyage from Liverpool to Dublin.
Trafalgar	United Kingdom	The ship capsized at Cork. She was on a voyage from Saint Kitts to London. Trafalgar was subsequently repaired.
Triton	Sweden	The ship was wrecked on the French coast. She was on a voyage from Gothenburg to San Sebastián, Spain.
Vrow Rebecca Elizabeth	Prussia	The ship departed from Norden for London in early January. No further trace, presumed foundered with the loss of all hands.
William Dent	United Kingdom	During a voyage in a convoy from Jamaica to London, the West Indiaman became separated from the convoy in the North Atlantic Ocean off the Grand Banks of Newfoundland during a heavy gale that struck between 21 and 24 January and was never heard from again.
Yare	United Kingdom	The ship was wrecked near "Olay".
Young Henry	United Kingdom	The ship was lost near Figueira da Foz. She was on a voyage from London to Lisbon.

== February ==
=== 2 February ===
List of shipwrecks: 2 February 1814
Ship	State	Description
Emperor Alexander	United Kingdom	The ship capsized at Liverpool, Lancashire.
Esther	United Kingdom	The ship was lost near Havana, Cuba. She was on a voyage from London to Havana.
Navigator	United Kingdom	The ship was lost near Havana. She was on a voyage from London to Havana.

=== 3 February ===
List of shipwrecks: 3 February 1814
Ship	State	Description
Paragon	United Kingdom	The ship ran aground on the Kentish Knock and was wrecked. Her crew survived. She was on a voyage from Hull, Yorkshire to Lisbon, Portugal.

=== 4 February ===
List of shipwrecks: 4 February 1814
Ship	State	Description
Eliza	United Kingdom	The ship was driven ashore and wrecked in the Cattewater.

=== 5 February ===
List of shipwrecks: 5 February 1814
Ship	State	Description
Robert	United Kingdom	The ship was wrecked on the Gunfleet Sand, in the North Sea off the coast of Essex. Her crew were rescued. She was on a voyage from South Shields, County Durham, to London.

=== 6 February ===
List of shipwrecks: 6 February 1814
Ship	State	Description
York Packet	United Kingdom	The ship struck a rock off "Faru Island" and was damaged. She was on a voyage from Leith, Lothian to Hull, Yorkshire. She put in to South Shields, County Durham for repairs.

=== 8 February ===
List of shipwrecks: 8 February 1814
Ship	State	Description
Industry	United Kingdom	War of 1812: The ship was captured by USS Adams (United States Navy) while on a voyage from Newfoundland, British North America to the West Indies. She was set afire and sunk.
Lord Cochrane	United Kingdom	The ship ran aground on the Peverel Ledge, in the English Channel. She was on a voyage from Southampton, Hampshire to Poole, Dorset. She was refloated.

=== 9 February ===
List of shipwrecks: 9 February 1814
Ship	State	Description
Resolution	United Kingdom	The ship was driven ashore between "Marsh" and Redcar, Yorkshire. She was on a voyage from London to Newcastle upon Tyne, Northumberland.
Venus	United Kingdom	The ship was driven ashore. She was on a voyage from Hull, Yorkshire to London. She was refloated and put back to Hull.

=== 10 February ===
List of shipwrecks: 10 February 1814
Ship	State	Description
Adventure	United Kingdom	The brig was destroyed by fire at Llanelli, Glamorgan.

=== 11 February ===
List of shipwrecks: 11 February 1814
Ship	State	Description
William & Alexander	United Kingdom	The sloop was wrecked near Land's End, Cornwall. Her crew were rescued. She was on a voyage from Penzance, Cornwall to Swansea, Glamorgan.

=== 12 February ===
List of shipwrecks: 12 February 1814
Ship	State	Description
Miranda	United Kingdom	War of 1812: The ship was captured off Barbados by the privateer Chasseur (United States) while on a voyage from Belfast, County Antrim, to Guadeloupe. She was set afire and sunk.

=== 13 February ===
List of shipwrecks: 13 February 1814
Ship	State	Description
Neptune	United Kingdom	The ship was abandoned off "St. Jullans". She was on a voyage from Palermo, Sicily to Gibraltar and Lisbon, Portugal.
William	United Kingdom	The ship departed from Lisbon, Portugal for London. No further trace, presumed foundered with the loss of all hands.

=== 14 February ===
List of shipwrecks: 14 February 1814
Ship	State	Description
HMS Pictou	Royal Navy	War of 1812: The schooner was captured and sunk by USS Constitution (United States Navy).

=== 15 February ===
List of shipwrecks: 15 February 1814
Ship	State	Description
Kitty	United Kingdom	War of the Sixth Coalition: The ship was captured and burnt by a French privateer. She was on a voyage from Greenock, Renfrewshire, to Saint Domingo.

=== 16 February ===
List of shipwrecks: 16 February 1814
Ship	State	Description
Ann	United Kingdom	War of the Sixth Coalition: The ship was captured and burnt by the frigate Jahde (French Navy). She was on a voyage from Porto, Portugal to Bahia, Brazil.
Seville Packet	United Kingdom	The ship was wrecked on the Long Sand, in the North Sea. Her crew were rescued. She was on a voyage from Dunbar. Lothian to Lisbon, Portugal.

=== 18 February ===
List of shipwrecks: 18 February 1814
Ship	State	Description
Swan	United Kingdom	War of the Sixth Coalition: The frigate Jahde (French Navy) captured and burnt Swan, which was on a voyage from Passages to Rio de Janeiro.
Townsend Packet	United Kingdom	War of the Sixth Coalition: The French frigate Clorinde (French Navy) captured and sank the ship, which was on a voyage from Brazil to Falmouth, Cornwall.

=== 20 February ===
List of shipwrecks: 20 February 1814
Ship	State	Description
Elizabeth	United Kingdom	The ship struck the Redcar Rocks and sank. Her crew were rescued.
Patna	(Ottoman Empire) Egypt	The ship foundered in the Red Sea off Jeddah, Habesh Eyalet with the loss of all hands.

=== 21 February ===
List of shipwrecks: 21 February 1814
Ship	State	Description
Unity	United Kingdom	War of 1812: The sloop was captured at Union Island, Trinidad by the privateer Saratoga (United States). She was set afire and sunk.

=== 22 February ===
List of shipwrecks: 22 February 1814
Ship	State	Description
Alliance	United Kingdom	The transport ship was wrecked on the Haisborough Sands, in the North Sea off the coast of Norfolk with the loss of thirteen of the 23 people on board. She was on a voyage from Whitby, Yorkshire to London.
Flaxton	United Kingdom	The transport ship was lost off Goree, South Holland, Netherlands. Her crew were rescued.
Guista	Malta	The ship was wrecked east of Cape Brule while on a voyage from Malta to Alexandria, Egypt.
Lady Mackworth	United Kingdom	The transport ship was driven ashore and wrecked at Bona, Algeria.
Mary	United Kingdom	The transport ship was lost off Goree. Her crew were rescued.

=== 23 February ===
List of shipwrecks: 23 February 1814
Ship	State	Description
Escalapius	United Kingdom	The ship struck the Shipwash Sand, in the North Sea and was consequently beached at Orford, Suffolk, where she was wrecked.

=== 24 February ===
List of shipwrecks: 24 February 1814
Ship	State	Description
Ceres	United Kingdom	The ship was wrecked near Sutton, County Dublin with the loss of a crew member. She was on a voyage from Whitehaven, Cumberland, to Dublin.
Esther	United Kingdom	The ship was wrecked near Havana, Cuba. She was on a voyage from London to Havana.
Navigator	United Kingdom	The ship was wrecked near Havana. She was on a voyage from London to Havana.

=== 25 February ===
List of shipwrecks: 25 February 1814
Ship	State	Description
Mary	United Kingdom	The ship was driven ashore in Dundrum Bay. She was on a voyage from Bilbao, Spain to Belfast, County Antrim. She was refloated on 6 March.
William and Elizabeth	United Kingdom	The ship was driven ashore and wrecked at Stromness, Orkney Islands. Her crew were rescued. She was on a voyage from Aberdeen to Surinam. William and Elizabeth was refloated in late March and taken in to Stromness.

=== 27 February ===
List of shipwrecks: 27 February 1814
Ship	State	Description
Carteret	United Kingdom	War of the Sixth Coalition: The packet ship was captured in the Atlantic Ocean (49°55′N 10°50′W) by the brig Halcyon (France) while on a voyage from Suriname to London. She was set afire and sunk.

=== 28 February ===
List of shipwrecks: 28 February 1814
Ship	State	Description
HMS Anacreon	Royal Navy	The Cormorant-class ship-sloop foundered without a trace in the English Channel while returning from Lisbon.
Hoppett	United Kingdom	The ship was last sighted on this date. Presumed subsequently foundered with the loss of all hands.

=== Unknown date ===
List of shipwrecks: Unknown date in February 1814
Ship	State	Description
Amity	United Kingdom	The ship was wrecked off Spurn Point, Yorkshire before 8 February. Her crew were rescued.
Amizada	Portugal	War of the Sixth Coalition: The ship was captured and sunk off the Cape Verde Islands by two French Navy frigates. She was on a voyage from Lisbon to Santos, Brazil.
Apollo	United Kingdom	The ship was driven ashore on the Isle of Man. Her crew were rescued. She was on a voyage from Carron, Stirlingshire to Liverpool, Lancashire.
Beresford	United Kingdom	The transport ship was wrecked on the Haak Sand, in the North Sea off the Dutch coast. There were 42 survivors. She was on a voyage from The Downs to a Dutch port.
George and Mary	United Kingdom	The sloop was driven ashore and wrecked between Happisburgh and Mundesley, Norfolk. Her crew were rescued.
Hazard	United Kingdom	The ship was wrecked at Saint-Jean-de-Luz, Basses-Pyrénées, France.
Kitty	United Kingdom	The ship was lost on the coast of Africa. Kitty was a British privateer operating off Sierra Leone when a Spanish slave trader captured her, killed her master, enslaved some of her crew, and then scuttled her.
Lionel & Anthony	United Kingdom	The ship departed from Tenerife, Canary Islands, for London. No further trace, presumed foundered with the loss of all hands.
Lord Collingwood	United Kingdom	The ship was driven ashore near "Villanova". She was on a voyage from Newfoundland, British North America to Porto, Portugal. Lord Collingwood broke up on 25 February.
Maria Antonia	Spain	The ship was wrecked on a reef off the Abaco Islands. Her crew were rescued. She was on a voyage from Amelia Island, East Florida, New Spain to Havana, Cuba.
Mary	United Kingdom	The ship was lost off Goree, South Holland, Netherlands. She was on a voyage from St. Ubes, Portugal to Rotterdam, South Holland.
Nancy	United Kingdom	The transport ship was wrecked on the Haaks Sand with the loss of all on board. She was on a voyage from The Downs to a Dutch port.
Plutos	United Kingdom	War of 1812:The Barque was captured by Privateer America (United States) in the Atlantic Ocean off the British Isles and was scuttled in February or early March.
Redligheten	Sweden	The brig was driven ashore at Goree. She was on a voyage from St. Ubes to Rotterdam.
Santa Anna	Spain	The ship was driven ashore and wrecked near Bilbao. She was on a voyage from London to St. Andero
Thomas and Sarah	United Kingdom	The transport ship was wrecked on the French coast.
Unnamed	United Kingdom	War of 1812:The old vessel was captured by Privateer America (United States) in the Atlantic Ocean off the British Isles and was stripped and scuttled by gunfire in the first week of February.
Whitby	United Kingdom	The transport ship was destroyed by fire at Palermo, Sicily.

== March ==
=== 1 March ===
List of shipwrecks: 1 March 1814
Ship	State	Description
Alliance	United Kingdom	The ship was wrecked on the Haisborough Sands, in the North Sea off the coast of Norfolk. At least nine of her crew survived. She was on a voyage from Whitby, Yorkshire to London.
Amiable Ann	Spain	The brig was abandoned off Padstow, Cornwall, United Kingdom. She was on a voyage from Rivadeo to London, United Kingdom.
Caernarvon Castle	United Kingdom	The transport ship was wrecked at "Passages". Her crew were rescued.
Charlotte	United Kingdom	The brigantine was driven ashore and wrecked at Oxwich, Glamorgan. Her crew were rescued. She was on a voyage from Great Yarmouth, Norfolk, to Neath, Glamorgan.
Unity	United Kingdom	The ship was wrecked on Nash Point, Glamorgan with the loss of three of her seven crew. She was on a voyage from Cardigan to Bristol, Gloucestershire.
Venus	United Kingdom	The transport ship was wrecked at "Passages". Her crew were rescued.

=== 2 March ===
List of shipwrecks: 2 March 1814
Ship	State	Description
Conference	United Kingdom	The ship was wrecked on the Newcombe Sand, in the North Sea off Great Yarmouth, Norfolk. Her crew were rescued. She was on a voyage from Newcastle upon Tyne, Northumberland to London.
Mary Ann	United Kingdom	The ship was sighted off Poole, Dorset. She was on a voyage from Lisbon Portugal to London. No further trace, presumed foundered with the loss of all hands.
Minerva	France	The ship was lost near "Passages". She was on a voyage from Salou, Spain to Passages.
Orion	United Kingdom	The ship .
Risk	United Kingdom	The ship was driven ashore and wrecked on the coast of Spain Her crew were rescued. She was on a voyage from St. Andero, Spain to Cork.
Spring	United Kingdom	The transport ship was driven ashore and wrecked near Bayonne, Gironde, France.

=== 3 March ===
List of shipwrecks: 3 March 1814
Ship	State	Description
Ardent	United Kingdom	The transport ship was wrecked in the Bay of Biscay. Her crew were rescued.
Benjamin	United Kingdom	The ship was run into by another vessel in the Tagus at Lisbon, Portugal and was wrecked. She was on a voyage from London to New Providence, Bahamas.
Fox	United Kingdom	The ship was wrecked in the Bay of Biscay. Her crew were rescued.
Friendship	United Kingdom	The ship was wrecked in the Bay of Biscay with the loss of all hands.
HMS Gleaner	Royal Navy	The ketch foundered in the Bay of Biscay off Saint-Jean-de-Luz, Basses-Pyrénées. Her crew were rescued.
London	United Kingdom	The transport ship was wrecked in the Bay of Biscay. Her crew were rescued.
Mercury	United Kingdom	The ship was driven ashore at Gibraltar. She was on a voyage from Messina, Sicily to Liverpool, Lancashire. Mercury was later refloated.
Minerva	United Kingdom	The letter of marque was wrecked in the Bay of Biscay. Her crew were rescued.
Susanna	United Kingdom	The ship capsized at Cork.
Tranquillidad	Sweden	The ship was lost near Cádiz, Spain. She was on a voyage from Gibraltar to Lisbon, Portugal
More than 30 unnamed vessels	Flags unknown	The ships were driven ashore at Gibraltar.

=== 4 March ===
List of shipwrecks: 4 March 1814
Ship	State	Description
Britannia	United Kingdom	The ship was lost on the New Sand, in the North Sea off the coast of County Durham. Her crew were rescued. She was on a voyage from South Shields, County Durham to London.

=== 5 March ===
List of shipwrecks: 5 March 1814
Ship	State	Description
Ocean	United Kingdom	The ship was wrecked on the Stoney Binks, in the North Sea off the mouth of the Humber. Her crew were rescued. She was on a voyage from Newcastle upon Tyne, Northumberland to Faversham, Kent.

=== 6 March ===
List of shipwrecks: 6 March 1814
Ship	State	Description
Britannia	United Kingdom	The ship was wrecked on the Newsand, at the mouth of the Humber. She was on a voyage from South Shields, County Durham to London.

=== 7 March ===
List of shipwrecks: 7 March 1814
Ship	State	Description
Ferreby, or Ferribee	United Kingdom	The ship ran aground on the Holm Sand, in the North Sea and sank. Her crew were rescued. She was on a voyage from Great Yarmouth to London.
William and Susan	United Kingdom	The ship was driven ashore and wrecked at Theddlethorpe, Lincolnshire.

=== 8 March ===
List of shipwrecks: 8 March 1814
Ship	State	Description
Elizabeth	United Kingdom	The ship departed from Goree, South Holland, Netherlands for London. No further trace, presumed foundered with the loss of all hands.

=== 9 March ===
List of shipwrecks: 9 March 1814
Ship	State	Description
Bellisarius	Portugal	The ship was driven ashore at Porto. She was on a voyage from Porto to the Brazils.
Effort	United Kingdom	The ship was last sighted on this date. She was on a voyage from Nigril Bay, Jamaica to London. Presumed foundered with the loss of all hands.
John Palmer	United Kingdom	The ship was under charter to the British East India Company when she wrecked off Ovar, Portugal. She was on a voyage from Bengal, India, to the Île Bourbon and London.
Resolution	United Kingdom	The ship was lost near Bideford, Devon. Her crew were rescued. She was on a voyage from Bristol, Gloucestershire, to Barnstaple, Devon.
Sylph	United Kingdom	War of 1812: The ship was captured and burnt by the privateer America (United States). She was on a voyage from Liverpool, Nova Scotia, British North America to Barbados.

=== 10 March ===
List of shipwrecks: 10 March 1814
Ship	State	Description
Alpha	United Kingdom	The ship was lost near Tynemouth, Northumberland. Her crew were rescued.
Unnamed	United Kingdom	The sloop was run into by a whaler and sank at Hull, Yorkshire.

=== 11 March ===
List of shipwrecks: 11 March 1814
Ship	State	Description
Friends	United Kingdom	War of 1812: The brig was driven ashore near Long Island, New York, United States by the privateer Diomede (United States).

=== 13 March ===
List of shipwrecks: 13 March 1814
Ship	State	Description
Asia	India	The ship ran aground in the Strait of Sunda. She was on a voyage from Batavia, Netherlands East Indies to Bombay. She was refloated and resumed her voyage.
Unnamed	Flag unknown	The ship was wrecked at Porto, Portugal with the loss of all on board. She was on a voyage from Île Bourbon to Portugal.

=== 15 March ===
List of shipwrecks: 15 March 1814
Ship	State	Description
Ann	United Kingdom	The ship was driven ashore near Halifax, Nova Scotia, British North America. She was refloated on 20 March.
Four Sisters	United Kingdom	The ship was driven ashore near Halifax.

=== 16 March ===
List of shipwrecks: 16 March 1814
Ship	State	Description
Lark	United Kingdom	The ship was lost near Southampton, Hampshire. She was on a voyage from London to Saint-Jean-de-Luz, Basses-Pyrénées, France.

=== 17 March ===
List of shipwrecks: 17 March 1814
Ship	State	Description
Unnamed	United Kingdom	The East Indiaman foundered in the Atlantic Ocean 4 leagues (12 nautical miles (22 km) off Lisbon, Portugal with the loss of all hands, more than 300 lives.

=== 19 March ===
List of shipwrecks: 19 March 1814
Ship	State	Description
Czarina	United Kingdom	War of the Sixth Coalition: The ship was captured and burnt by Atalante (French Navy). She was on a voyage from Buenos Aires to London.

=== 20 March ===
List of shipwrecks: 20 March 1814
Ship	State	Description
Maria	United Kingdom	War of 1812: The ship was captured by the privateer Caroline (United States). She was set afire and sunk. Maria was on a voyage from Puerto Plata Hispaniola to Jamaica.

=== 21 March ===
List of shipwrecks: 21 March 1814
Ship	State	Description
Orion	United Kingdom	The ketch foundered in the English Channel east of St Anthony Head, Cornwall. Her crew were rescued. She was on a voyage from London to Falmouth, Cornwall.

=== 22 March ===
List of shipwrecks: 22 March 1814
Ship	State	Description
HMS Decoy	Royal Navy	Napoleonic Wars: The Decoy-class cutter ran aground on the French coast and was captured with the loss of two of her crew.

=== 23 March ===
List of shipwrecks: 23 March 1814
Ship	State	Description
Changeable	United Kingdom	The ship was run down in the Swin by Calypso (United Kingdom) with the loss of four lives. She was on a voyage from South Shields, County Durham, to London.

=== 24 March ===
List of shipwrecks: 24 March 1814
Ship	State	Description
HMS Decoy	Royal Navy	War of the Sixth Coalition: The naval cutter was driven ashore at Calais, France. French troops fired on her, forcing her surrender.
Salome	United Kingdom	The sloop was wrecked on the Atterfield Rocks, in the English Channel off the Isle of Wight. She was on a voyage from Newry, County Down, to London.

=== 25 March ===
List of shipwrecks: 25 March 1814
Ship	State	Description
Rebecca	(United Kingdom of Great Britain and Ireland) British North America	The ship was wrecked on Cape Sable Island.

=== 30 March ===
List of shipwrecks: 30 March 1814
Ship	State	Description
Alice	United Kingdom	The ship sank in the River Shannon. Her crew were rescued by a pilot boat. She was on a voyage from Limerick to Liverpool, Lancashire.
Fairfield	United Kingdom	The ship ran aground on the North Bank, in Liverpool Bay. She was on a voyage from Jamaica to Liverpool. She was refloated, and taken in to Liverpool the next day.

=== 31 March ===
List of shipwrecks: 31 March 1814
Ship	State	Description
Havant	United Kingdom	The ship foundered in the English Channel off Berry Head, Devon. Her crew were rescued by HMS Hope (Royal Navy). She was on a voyage from Arundel, Sussex, to Dublin.
Pompey	United Kingdom	The ship was wrecked on the Main Reef, off the coast of British Honduras.
Union	United Kingdom	The ship was wrecked near the Sambro Island Lighthouse, Nova Scotia, British North America. She was on a voyage from Jamaica to Glasgow, Renfrewshire.

=== Unknown date ===
List of shipwrecks: Unknown date in March 1814
Ship	State	Description
Alpha	United Kingdom	The ship foundered in the Irish Sea off Holyhead, Anglesey. She was on a voyage from Drogheda, County Louth, to Liverpool, Lancashire.
Amity	United Kingdom	The ship was driven ashore at "Berhum". She was on a voyage from London to Heligoland. She was refloated.
Aurora	Sweden	The ship was lost off Terschelling, Friesland, Netherlands. She was on a voyage from Gothenburg to Amsterdam, North Holland, Netherlands.
Beaver	United Kingdom	The ship was wrecked near Bridlington, Yorkshire.
Crow Isle	United Kingdom	The ship foundered in the North Sea off Great Yarmouth, Norfolk. Her crew were rescued. She was on a voyage from Smyrna, Ottoman Empire, to Hull, Yorkshire.
Curlew	United Kingdom	War of 1812: The ship was captured and destroyed by an American privateer.
De Good Verwachting	Sweden	The galiot was driven ashore at "Chilton", Isle of Wight, United Kingdom. She was on a voyage from Liverpool to Rotterdam, South Holland, Netherlands.
Diana	United Kingdom	The ship was damaged by ice in the Weser and was abandoned by her crew. She was on a voyage from London to Bremen.
Diana	United Kingdom	War of the Sixth Coalition: The transport ship was captured in the Atlantic Ocean by Étoile and Sultane (both French Navy) while on a voyage from London to Madeira, Portugal and the West Indies. She was set afire and sunk.
Emilia	Portugal	War of the Sixth Coalition: The ship was captured and destroyed off the Cape Verde Islands by two French frigates. She was on a voyage from Madeira to the Rio Grande.
Endeavour	United Kingdom	The transport ship was wrecked on the French coast.
Endymion	United Kingdom	The ship was driven ashore at Gibraltar.
Five Brothers	United Kingdom	The ship was driven ashore on the French coast. Her crew were rescued by HMS Dispatch (Royal Navy), which scuttled the ship.
George	United Kingdom	The ship foundered while on a voyage from Lisbon to Bilbao, Spain.
Harriet	(United Kingdom of Great Britain and Ireland) Guernsey	The ship was driven ashore in Betanza Bay, Spain.
Hercules	Argentina	Argentine Civil Wars: The 32-gun ship ran aground at Montevideo, United Provinces of the Río de la Plata. She was shelled by shore-based batteries and severely damaged with the loss of 60 killed or wounded. She was refloated the next day
Hoffnung	Sweden	The ship was lost off Terschelling. She was on a voyage from Gotheburg to Amsterdam.
John and Thomas	United Kingdom	War of 1812: The ship was captured by the privateer Midas (United States off Bordeaux, Gironde, France. She was set afire and sunk. John and Thomas was on a voyage from Cork to "Passages".
Lord Dundas Packet	United Kingdom	The ship was wrecked at Rattray Head, Aberdeenshire. She was on a voyage from Aberdeen to Fraserburgh, Aberdeenshire.
Mars	United States	War of 1812: The privateer brig was driven ashore near Boston, Massachusetts, by two Royal Navy ships. She was captured and burnt.
Nimrod	United Kingdom	The ship was driven ashore and wrecked at East Dean, Sussex.
Plutos	United Kingdom	War of 1812:The privateer America (United States) captured and scuttled the ship in the Atlantic Ocean off the British Isles in February or early March.
San Antonio Victoriosa	Spain	The ship was lost at the mouth of the Estuary of Bilbao with the loss of all hands. She was on a voyage from Lisbon, Portugal to Bilbao.
Sparkler	United Kingdom	The transport ship was driven ashore and wrecked at Bayonne, Basses-Pyrénées, France.
St. Johannes	Netherlands	The ship was driven ashore. She was on a voyage from London to Amsterdam, North Holland. She was refloated and put in to Harwich, Essex, United Kingdom.
Tystheton	Sweden	The ship was wrecked off Cádiz, Spain in early March. She was on a voyage from Gibraltar to St. Ubes, Portugal and Gothenburg.
Viagante	Portugal	War of the Sixth Coalition: The ship was captured and destroyed by Atalante (French Navy). She was on a voyage from Lisbon to Havana, Cuba.
Wells	United Kingdom	The ship was run down and sunk off Inchkeith by Sprightly (United Kingdom). She was on a voyage from London to Leith, Lothian.
Unnamed	France	The ship was lost near Ovar, Portugal.
Unnamed	Flag unknown	The sloop was wrecked on Green Island, British North America.

== April ==
=== 1 April ===
List of shipwrecks: 1 April 1814
Ship	State	Description
Alert	United Kingdom	War of 1812: The ship was captured and burnt by the privateer Revenge (United States). She was on a voyage from Cumaná, Captaincy General of Venezuela to Martinique.
Symmetry	United Kingdom	War of 1812: The ship was captured in the Atlantic Ocean off Cape Wrath, Sutherland by the privateer Scourge (United States) while on a voyage from Liverpool, Lancashire, to Pillau, Prussia. She was set afire and sunk.
Union	United Kingdom	War of 1812: The ship was captured in the Atlantic Ocean off Cape Wrath by the privateer Scourge (United States) while on a voyage from Liverpool to Newfoundland, British North America. She was set afire and sunk.

=== 2 April ===
List of shipwrecks: 2 April 1814
Ship	State	Description
Asia	India	The ship foundered in the Indian Ocean (approximately 10°S 85°E). She had previously run aground in the Straits of Sunda on 13 March. Asia was on a voyage from Batavia, Netherlands East Indies to Bombay.
Spring	United Kingdom	The transport ship was lost near Bayonne, Basses-Pyrénées, France.

=== 3 April ===
List of shipwrecks: 3 April 1814
Ship	State	Description
Alliance	Sweden	The ship capsized in the Tagus in a squall.

=== 4 April ===
List of shipwrecks: 4 April 1814
Ship	State	Description
Apollo	United Kingdom	War of 1812: The ship was captured and sunk in the Atlantic Ocean east of São Miguel, Azores, Portugal by the privateer Midas (United States).
Earl Gower	United Kingdom	War of 1812: The ship was captured and sunk in the Atlantic Ocean east of São Miguel by the privateer Midas (United States).
Herstelling	Netherlands	The ship ran aground in the Vlie. She was on a voyage from London, United Kingdom to Amsterdam, North Holland. She was refloated and taken in to Harlingen, Friesland.
St. Jago	United Kingdom	The ship was lost at the mouth of the Adour. Her crew were rescued. She was on a voyage from Liverpool, Lancashire, to "Passages".
Thames	United Kingdom	The transport ship was run into by the transport ship Santander (United Kingdom) at St. Andero, Spain and was severely damaged.

=== 5 April ===
List of shipwrecks: 5 April 1814
Ship	State	Description
Dove	(United Kingdom of Great Britain and Ireland) British North America	War of 1812: The brig was captured and burnt by the privateer Fox (United States).
Nautilus	United Kingdom	The ship was wrecked on the Kenfig sands, in the Bristol Channel with the loss of three of her five crew. She was on a voyage from Aberavon, Glamorgan, to Bristol, Gloucestershire.
Sophia	United Kingdom	The ship was wrecked on the south coast of Sicily. Her crew were rescued.
Star	United Kingdom	War of 1812: The ship was captured and sunk by the privateer Caroline (United States).

=== 7 April ===
List of shipwrecks: 7 April 1814
Ship	State	Description
Dart	United Kingdom	The ship sprang a leak and foundered in the North Sea 6 nautical miles (11 km) off Bridlington, East Riding of Yorkshire. She was on a voyage from Hull, Yorkshire to Stockton-on-Tees, County Durham.
Régulus	French Navy	War of the Sixth Coalition: The Téméraire-class ship of the line was set afire and scuttled off Meschers-sur-Gironde, Charente-Maritime to prevent her being captured by HMS Centaur and HMS Egmont (both Royal Navy).
Unnamed	Flag unknown	The abandoned brig was discovered 12 leagues (36 nautical miles (67 km) west of The Lizard, Cornwall by HMS Achates (Royal Navy). She was taken in to Falmouth, Cornwall.

=== 8 April ===
List of shipwrecks: 8 April 1814
Ship	State	Description
De Liefde	Netherlands	The ship was driven ashore at Brielle, South Holland. She was later refloated.

=== 9 April ===
List of shipwrecks: 9 April 1814
Ship	State	Description
27 unnamed vessels	United States	The vessels were destroyed in the Connecticut River by a Royal Navy squadron.

=== 12 April ===
List of shipwrecks: 12 April 1814
Ship	State	Description
Goree Packet	United Kingdom	The ship was driven ashore and damaged near Liverpool, Lancashire. She was on a voyage from Liverpool to "Passages".

=== 15 April ===
List of shipwrecks: 15 April 1814
Ship	State	Description
Royalist	United Kingdom	The ship foundered in the Davis Strait with the loss of all hands.

=== 16 April ===
List of shipwrecks: 16 April 1814
Ship	State	Description
Ranger	United Kingdom	The brig was driven ashore and wrecked at Port Louis, Mauritius. She was on a voyage from the Île de France, Mauritius to London.

=== 19 April ===
List of shipwrecks: 19 April 1814
Ship	State	Description
Emprador d'America	Portugal	The ship was driven ashore and wrecked at Pernambuco, Brazil.

=== 20 April ===
List of shipwrecks: 20 April 1814
Ship	State	Description
Joana	Malta	War of 1812: The ship was captured and sunk between Madeira and the Portuguese coast by an American privateer. She was on a voyage from Malta to Lisbon, Portugal.
Twee Gebroeders	Netherlands	The ship was driven ashore at Brielle, South Holland.

=== 23 April ===
List of shipwrecks: 23 April 1814
Ship	State	Description
Active	United Kingdom	War of 1812: The sloop was captured and burnt by the privateer Revenge (United States).
Martha	United Kingdom	War of 1812: The schooner was captured and burnt by the privateer Revenge (United States).

=== 24 April ===
List of shipwrecks: 24 April 1814
Ship	State	Description
Bridget	United Kingdom	The ship was driven ashore by ice near Copenhagen, Denmark. She was later refloated.
Principe	Portugal	The ship was driven ashore at Hoylake, Lancashire, United Kingdom. She was on a voyage from Maranhão, Brazil to Liverpool, Lancashire. Principe was refloated in May and taken in to Liverpool.
Stephen	United Kingdom	The ship was driven ashore by ice near Copenhagen.
Thetis	United Kingdom	The ship was driven ashore by ice near Copenhagen. She was later refloated.

=== 25 April ===
List of shipwrecks: 25 April 1814
Ship	State	Description
Argo	United Kingdom	The ship was driven ashore and wrecked at Valencia, Spain.
John and James	United Kingdom	The ship was wrecked near Montrose, Forfarshire. Her crew were rescued. She was on a voyage from Aberdeen to Montrose.

=== 27 April ===
List of shipwrecks: 27 April 1814
Ship	State	Description
Isis	United Kingdom	The ship was driven ashore on North Ronaldsay, Orkney Islands. She was on a voyage from Chatham, Kent, to Liverpool, Lancashire. Isis was later refloated and taken in to Ollerswich Bay.
Lovely Lass	United Kingdom	The ship was wrecked whilst on a voyage from Montego Bay to Falmouth, Jamaica.
Nikolay (Николай)	Imperial Russian Navy	The transport ship, a yacht, was driven ashore and wrecked on the Vistula Spit, east of Danzig. Her crew were rescued. She was on a voyage from Kronstadt to Pillau, Prussia.

=== 28 April ===
List of shipwrecks: 28 April 1814
Ship	State	Description
Lively	United Kingdom	The ship ran aground in the Swine Bottoms. She was on a voyage from Leith, Lothian, to Danzig. Lively was later refloated and taken in to Helsingør, Denmark.

=== 30 April ===
List of shipwrecks: 30 April 1814
Ship	State	Description
Thomas and Elizabeth	United Kingdom	The ship departed São Miguel, Azores for London. No further trace, presumed foundered with the loss of all hands.

=== Unknown date ===
List of shipwrecks: Unknown date in April 1814
Ship	State	Description
Diligence	United Kingdom	War of 1812: The ship was captured and destroyed by an American privateer. She was on a voyage from Halifax, Nova Scotia to Newfoundland, British North America.
Gotheborg	Sweden	The ship was wrecked on the coast of Jutland. Her crew were rescued. She was on a voyage from London, United Kingdom to Gothenburg.
Grenada Packet	United Kingdom	War of 1812: The ship was captured and destroyed by an American privateer.
Hoffnung	Sweden	Gunboat War: The schooner was captured by a Danish vessel. She was recaptured by HMS Locust (Royal Navy) but subsequently foundered in the Baltic Sea. She was on a voyage from Stockholm to Wolgast, Swedish Pomerania.
Huffnung	Flag unknown	The ship was wrecked near "Musan". She was on a voyage from Jersey, Channel Islands, to "Passages".
John Palmer	United Kingdom	The ship was wrecked near Lisbon, Portugal with the loss of over 100 lives.
Maria Catharina	Sweden	The ship was lost whilst on a voyage from Wolgast, Swedish Pomerania, to Gothenburg.
Metcalf	United Kingdom	The ship foundered off Port Maria, Jamaica. She was on a voyage from Jamaica to London.
Nancy	United Kingdom	The sloop was wrecked at Funchal, Madeira, Portugal. She was on a voyage from Madeira to São Miguel Island, Azores and London.
Ormuss	United Kingdom	The ship was driven ashore on the Holderness coast, Yorkshire and was severely damaged. She was refloated and put in to Bridlington, Yorkshire, where she arrived on 4 April.
Peggy	United Kingdom	The sloop was wrecked at the mouth of the River Spey.
Sophia	United Kingdom	The ship was wrecked at "Carrel", Portugal with the loss of six of her crew. She was on a voyage from Halifax, Nova Scotia, British North America to London.
Tom	United Kingdom	The ship was driven ashore near North Meols, Lancashire. She was on a voyage from Liverpool, Lancashire to Jamaica.
Wilhelmina	Sweden	War of 1812: The galliot was captured and burnt by the privateer Kemp (United States) before 16 April.

== May ==
=== 1 May ===
List of shipwrecks: 1 May 1814
Ship	State	Description
Hamilton	United Kingdom	War of 1812: The ship was captured and sunk by the privateer Scourge (United States). She was on a voyage from Greenock, Renfrewshire, to Quebec City, Lower Canada, British North America.
Jong Hendrick	Netherlands	The ship was wrecked at Brielle, South Holland.
Success	United Kingdom	The ship ran aground on Grassholm and was abandoned by her crew. She was on a voyage from London to Liverpool, Lancashire. She was refloated the next day and taken in to Milford, Pembrokeshire.

=== 2 May ===
List of shipwrecks: 2 May 1814
Ship	State	Description
John and James	United Kingdom	The sloop was wrecked at Montrose, Forfarshire. Her crew were rescued. She was on a voyage from Aberdeen to Montrose.
Wohlfarth	Flag unknown	The ship was driven ashore at Falsterbo, Sweden. She was on a voyage from Saint Petersburg, Russia to Lisbon, Portugal.

=== 3 May ===
List of shipwrecks: 3 May 1814
Ship	State	Description
Daphne	United Kingdom	The sloop was wrecked at Peterhead, Aberdeenshire. She was on a voyage from Peterhead to "Eisdale".

=== 4 May ===
List of shipwrecks: 4 May 1814
Ship	State	Description
Earl Moira	United Kingdom	The ship was driven ashore near Falmouth, Cornwall.
Kate	United Kingdom	The ship was driven ashore at Cork. She was on a voyage from London to Trinidad. Kate was later refloated.
Rover	United Kingdom	The ship was driven ashore near Teignmouth, Devon.

=== 5 May ===
List of shipwrecks: 5 May 1814
Ship	State	Description
Catherina Carolina	Greifswald	The ship was driven ashore near Malmö, Sweden.
Fate	United Kingdom	The ship was lost off the coast of Denmark. She was on a voyage from Gothenburg, Sweden to Stralsund, Swedish Pomerania.
Hope	United Kingdom	The ship was wrecked on the Seven Stones Reef with the loss of all on board. She was on a voyage from Swansea, Glamorgan, to Fowey, Cornwall.

=== 6 May ===
List of shipwrecks: 6 May 1814
Ship	State	Description
Lord Nelson	United Kingdom	War of 1812: The brig was captured and burnt by the privateer Ultor (United States). She was on a voyage from Rio de Janeiro to Havana, Cuba.

=== 8 May ===
List of shipwrecks: 8 May 1814
Ship	State	Description
Enigheden	Sweden	The ship was run down and sunk off Skagen, Denmark. Her crew were rescued. She was on a voyage from Leith, Lothian, United Kingdom to Gothenburg.

=== 9 May ===
List of shipwrecks: 9 May 1814
Ship	State	Description
Amity	United Kingdom	The ship ran aground on the Herd Sand, in the North Sea off the coast of County Durham. Her crew were rescued by the Shields Lifeboat. She was later refloated and taken in to North Shields, County Durham.
John & Jane	United Kingdom	The ship ran aground on the Herd Sand. Her crew were rescued by the Shields Lifeboat.

=== 13 May ===
List of shipwrecks: 13 May 1814
Ship	State	Description
Favorite	United Kingdom	The ship was driven ashore in the Belfast Lough. She was on a voyage from Liverpool, Lancashire, to Belfast, County Antrim. Favorite was later refloated.

=== 16 May ===
List of shipwrecks: 16 May 1814
Ship	State	Description
Banff	United Kingdom	The ship was driven ashore at Peterhead, Aberdeenshire. sHe was on a voyage from Leith, Lothian, to Peterhead.

=== 19 May ===
List of shipwrecks: 19 May 1814
Ship	State	Description
HMS Halcyon	Royal Navy	The Cruizer-class brig-sloop ran aground and capsized off Free Point, Jamaica. Her crew were rescued.
Maria	Hamburg	The ship was driven ashore at the mouth of the Elbe. She was on a voyage from Tenerife, Canary Islands, to Hamburg.
Nancy	(United Kingdom of Great Britain and Ireland) Demerara	War of 1812: The schooner was captured and burnt by the privateer Ultor (United States).

=== 20 May ===
List of shipwrecks: 20 May 1814
Ship	State	Description
Anna Dorothea	Sweden	The ship foundered in the North Sea with the loss of five of her ten crew. She was on a voyage from Stralsund, Swedish Pomerania, to London, United Kingdom.
Neptune	United Kingdom	The ship was driven ashore in Ringabella Bay. She was on a voyage from Liverpool, Lancashire, to Halifax, Nova Scotia, British North America.
Three Bees	United Kingdom	The convict ship was destroyed by fire at Bennelong Point, Sydney, New South Wales.

=== 21 May ===
List of shipwrecks: 21 May 1814
Ship	State	Description
Jane	United Kingdom	The ship sprang a leak and was beached at Sheerness, Kent. She was on a voyage from London to Rotterdam, South Holland, Netherlands.
Venus	United Kingdom	The ship was lost near Maranhão, Brazil. Her crew were rescued. She was on a voyage from Maranhão to Liverpool, Lancashire.

=== 22 May ===
List of shipwrecks: 22 May 1814
Ship	State	Description
Mars	United Kingdom	The ship was wrecked on the North Bank, in Liverpool Bay. She was on a voyage from Liverpool, Lancashire, to Windau, Swedish Pomerania.
Nimble	United Kingdom	War of 1812: The ship was captured and sunk by the privateer Rodney (United States). She was on a voyage from Penzance, Cornwall, to Madeira.

=== 23 May ===
List of shipwrecks: 23 May 1814
Ship	State	Description
Diligence	United Kingdom	The ship was run into by HMS Newcastle (Royal Navy) in the English Channel and was severely damaged with the loss of a crew member. Diligence was on a voyage from Southampton, Hampshire to Guernsey, Channel Islands. She was towed in to Southampton.
Duke of York	United Kingdom	War of 1812: The ship was captured and burnt off "Port Otatava" by the privateer Lawrence (United States).

=== 26 May ===
List of shipwrecks: 26 May 1814
Ship	State	Description
Speculator	United Kingdom	The ship was towed in to St. Ives, Cornwall in a sinking condition. She was on a voyage from Liverpool, Lancashire to A Coruña, Spain and the West Indies.

=== 28 May ===
List of shipwrecks: 28 May 1814
Ship	State	Description
Barton	United Kingdom	War of 1812: The ship was captured and burnt off the African coast by USS Syren (United States Navy).

=== 31 May ===
List of shipwrecks: 31 May 1814
Ship	State	Description
Ann	United Kingdom	The ship was driven ashore and wrecked at Portsmouth, Hampshire.

=== Unknown date ===
List of shipwrecks: Unknown date in May 1814
Ship	State	Description
Active	United Kingdom	War of the Sixth Coalition: The ship was captured and sunk in the Atlantic Ocean by Jahde (French Navy). She was on a voyage from São Miguel Island, Azores, Portugal to London.
Conde de Galveas	Portugal	War of the Sixth Coalition: The ship was captured and sunk by Aréthuse and Illyrienne (both French Navy). Conde de Galveas was on a voyage from Rio de Janeiro, Brazil to Lisbon.
Dois Amigos	Portugal	War of the Sixth Coalition: The ship was captured and sunk by Aréthuse and Illyrienne (both French Navy). Dios Amigos was on a voyage from São Miguel, Azores to Lisbon.
Face	United Kingdom	The ship foundered while on a voyage from Gothenburg to Stralsund, Sweden.
Hendrick	Netherlands	The ship foundered off Walcheren, Zeeland. Her crew were rescued. She was on a voyage from London, United Kingdom to Rotterdam, South Holland.
Herstelling	Netherlands	The brig ran aground at Porto, Portugal and was damaged. She was on a voyage from Amsterdam, North Holland, to Porto. Herstelling was later refloated and taken in to Porto.
James	United Kingdom	The ship was presumed to have foundered with the loss of all hands. She was on a voyage from Poole, Dorset, to Saint-Jean-de-Luz, Basses-Pyrénées, France.
Jane	United Kingdom	War of the Sixth Coalition: The ship was captured and sunk in the Atlantic Ocean by Jahde (French Navy). She was on a voyage from "Passages" to Dublin.
John	United Kingdom	War of the Sixth Coalition: The ship was captured and sunk in the Atlantic Ocean by Jahde (French Navy). She was on a voyage from Saint-Jean-de-Luz to Cork.
Moore	United Kingdom	The ship foundered in the Grand Banks of Newfoundland. Her crew were rescued. She was on a voyegr from Liverpool, Lancashire, to Newfoundland, British North America.
Perseverance	United Kingdom	The ship was lost on the South Bishop Sandbank. She was on a voyage from Bristol, Gloucestershire, to Liverpool.
Prince of Wales	United Kingdom	War of the Sixth Coalition: The ship was captured and sunk in the Atlantic Ocean by Jahde (French Navy). She was on a voyage from Saint-Jean-de-Luz to Cork.
Princess of Wales	United Kingdom	The ship was run down and sunk in the Atlantic Ocean with the loss of twelve of her crew. She was on a voyage from Portsmouth, Hampshire, to Prince Edward Island, British North America.
Recovery	United Kingdom	War of 1812: The ship was driven ashore on the coat of British North America by the privateer Diomede (United States).
Robert and George	United Kingdom	War of the Sixth Coalition: The ship was captured and sunk in the Atlantic Ocean by Jahde (French Navy). She was on a voyage from "Passages" to Waterford.
Santa Barbara	Spain	War of the Sixth Coalition: The ship was captured and sunk by Aréthuse and Illyrienne (both French Navy).
Successo	Portugal	War of the Sixth Coalition: The ship was captured and sunk by Aréthuse and Illyrienne (both French Navy). She was on a voyage from São Miguel to Lisbon.
William	United Kingdom	The ship was run down and sunk by James & Charlotte. Her crew were rescued. She was on a voyage from Lisbon to London.

== June ==
=== 2 June ===
List of shipwrecks: 2 June 1814
Ship	State	Description
Hope	United Kingdom	The ship sprang a leak and foundered in the Mediterranean Sea. Her crew survived. She was on a voyage from Livorno, French Empire to London.
Neptune	United Kingdom	War of 1812: The ship was captured and destroyed by USS Wasp (United States Navy). She was on a voyage from Liverpool, Lancashire, to Halifax, Nova Scotia, British North America.

=== 3 June ===
List of shipwrecks: 3 June 1814
Ship	State	Description
Swift	United Kingdom	The ship was driven ashore at Dagerort, Russia.

=== 9 June ===
List of shipwrecks: 9 June 1814
Ship	State	Description
John	United Kingdom	War of 1812: The ship was captured and burnt by the privateer Herald. She was on a voyage from Barbados to Lisbon, Portugal.
Watson	United Kingdom	The ship was lost near Cape Breton Island, Nova Scotia, British North America. She was on a voyage from Liverpool, Lancashire, to Newfounland and Miramichi, New Brunswick, British North America.

=== 11 June ===
List of shipwrecks: 11 June 1814
Ship	State	Description
Haulpa	United States	The abandoned and waterlogged ship was discovered in the Atlantic Ocean (32°N 52°W) by the packet ship Princess Mary (United Kingdom).

=== 13 June ===
List of shipwrecks: 13 June 1814
Ship	State	Description
William	United Kingdom	War of 1812: The ship was captured and destroyed by USS Wasp (United States Navy). She was on a voyage from Limerick to Lisbon, Portugal.
William	United Kingdom	The ship was driven ashore at Helsingør, Denmark. She was on a voyage from Saint Petersburg, Russia to Lancaster, Lancashire. She was refloated in September.

=== 14 June ===
List of shipwrecks: 14 June 1814
Ship	State	Description
Jane	United Kingdom	The ship was wrecked on the coast of County Wexford. Her crew survived. She was on a voyage from Jamaica to the Clyde.
St. Lawrence	United Kingdom	The ship was driven ashore near Campbeltown, Argyllshire. she was on a voyage from Greenock, Renfrewshire, to Trinidad. She was later refloated.

=== 15 June ===
List of shipwrecks: 15 June 1814
Ship	State	Description
Enigkeyt (Энигкейт, 'Einigkeit')	Imperial Russian Navy	The transport ship ran aground and was wrecked off the north side of Bolshoy Tyuters. Her crew were rescued. She was on a voyage from Kronstadt to Reval.
Jane	United Kingdom	The ship was wrecked near Wexford with the loss of four of her crew. She was on a voyage from New Providence, Bahamas, to Bermuda and the Clyde.
Perseverance	United Kingdom	The ship was run ashore and wrecked near Campo Bello. She was on a voyage from Halifax, Nova Scotia, British North America to St. Andrews.

=== 16 June ===
List of shipwrecks: 16 June 1814
Ship	State	Description
Garland	United Kingdom	The ship as driven ashore and wrecked at Bideford, Devon. She was on a voyage from Saint Vincent to Bristol, Gloucestershire.

=== 17 June ===
List of shipwrecks: 17 June 1814
Ship	State	Description
Alexander Duncan	United Kingdom	The ship foundered in the North Sea. Her crew were rescued. She was on a voyage from London to Fort William, Inverness-shire.
Amity	(United Kingdom of Great Britain and Ireland) Antigua	War of 1812: The schooner was captured and burnt by the privateer Ultor (United States).
Orient	United Kingdom	War of 1812: The ship was captured and destroyed by the privateer Pike (United States). She was on a voyage from London to Tenerife, Canary Islands.
Seaflower	United Kingdom	War of 1812: The ship was captured by USS Peacock (United States Navy) while on a voyage from St. John's, Newfoundland, British North America to Barbados. She was set afire and sunk.

=== 18 June ===
List of shipwrecks: 18 June 1814
Ship	State	Description
Pallas	United Kingdom	War of 1812: The ship was captured and destroyed by USS Wasp (United States Navy). She was on a voyage from Mogadore, Morocco to London.

=== 21 June ===
List of shipwrecks: 21 June 1814
Ship	State	Description
Mary & Betsey	United Kingdom	War of 1812: The ship was captured and burnt by the privateer Kemp (United States). She was on a voyage from St. Andero, Spain to Bristol, Gloucestershire.

=== 22 June ===
List of shipwrecks: 22 June 1814
Ship	State	Description
Perfect	United Kingdom	The ship was seen off Santo Domingo, Hispaniola bound for Jamaica. No further trace, presumed foundered with the loss of all hands.

=== 23 June ===
List of shipwrecks: 23 June 1814
Ship	State	Description
Ann	United Kingdom	The ship was lost at Ostend, East Flanders, Netherlands with the loss of all hands.
Rover	United Kingdom	The ship was lost at Ostend with the loss of all hands.

=== 24 June ===
List of shipwrecks: 24 June 1814
Ship	State	Description
Dover	United Kingdom	War of 1812: The ship was captured and burnt by the privateer Rattlesnake (United States). She was on a voyage from London to Lisbon, Portugal.
Esther	United Kingdom	The ship was driven ashore on Prince Edward Island, British North America.
Thomas	United Kingdom	The ship ran aground on the Lemon and Ower Sand, in the North Sea and capsized. She was on a voyage from Dantzic to London. She was refloated the next day and taken in to Southwold, Suffolk.
Wasp	(United Kingdom of Great Britain and Ireland) Guernsey	War of 1812: The ship was captured and burnt by the privateer Rattlesnake (United States).

=== 26 June ===
List of shipwrecks: 26 June 1814
Ship	State	Description
Commerce	United Kingdom	The ship ran aground on The Manacles. Her crew were rescued. She was on a voyage from Plymouth, Devon, to Cardiff, Glamorgan. She was later refloated and taken in to Porthoustock Cove, Cornwall.
Farmer	United Kingdom	War of 1812: The sloop was captured and sunk in the Atlantic Ocean by the privateer Mammoth (United States).
Oranje Booven	United Kingdom	War of 1812: The ship was captured and burnt by USS Wasp (United States Navy). She was on a voyage from Bermuda to London.

=== 28 June ===
List of shipwrecks: 28 June 1814
Ship	State	Description
HMS Leopard	Royal Navy	The Portland-class fourth-rate, operating as a troopship, ran aground and was wrecked on Anticosti Island, British North America. All on board survived.
HMS Reindeer	Royal Navy	USS Wasp and HMS Reindeer. War of 1812: The Cruizer-class brig-sloop was captured by USS Wasp (United States Navy) in the Atlantic Ocean 500 nautical miles (930 km) west of Ouessant, Finistère, France. She was set afire and sunk the next day.

=== 30 June ===
List of shipwrecks: 30 June 1814
Ship	State	Description
USS Alligator	United States Navy	The schooner sank in Port Royal Sound in a heavy storm. 23 crew killed.
Margaret	United Kingdom	The schooner sprang a leak and then caught fire in the Firth of Forth. She was abandoned by her crew. Margaret was on a voyage from Sunderland, County Durham, to Newburgh, Fife.

=== Unknown date ===
List of shipwrecks: Unknown date in June 1814
Ship	State	Description
Elena	Malta	The ship was driven ashore on the south coast of Sicily.
Fermina	United Kingdom	The ship was wrecked on the Herd Sand, in the North Sea. Her crew were rescued. She was on a voyage from South Shields, County Durham, to London.
Frederica Christina	Norway	The ship was driven ashore on the Dutch coast. She was on a voyage from Trondheim to Amsterdam, North Holland, Netherlands.
Friendship	United Kingdom	War of 1812: The ship was captured in the Atlantic Ocean off Cape Finisterre, Spain by the privateer General Armstrong (United States). She was set afire and sunk. Friendship was on a voyage from "Passages" to Lisbon, Portugal.
Jessie	United Kingdom	War of 1812: The ship was captured by the privateer Amelia (United States). She was set afire and sunk. Jessie was on a voyage from London to Newfoundland, British North America.
John	United Kingdom	War of 1812: The ship was captured and sunk by USS Rattlesnake (United States Navy). She was on a voyage from Liverpool, Lancashire, to Porto, Portugal.
John Duncan	United Kingdom	War of 1812: The ship was captured and sunk off Cape Finisterre, Spain by the privateer Rattlesnake (United States). She was on a voyage from Newcastle upon Tyne, Northumberland to Tenerife, Canary Islands.
Lavinia	United Kingdom	The ship was lost near the mouth of the Elbe.
Pearl	United Kingdom	The ship ran aground on the Long Sand, in the North Sea off the coast of Essex. She was on a voyage from Rotterdam, South Holland, Netherlands to Gibraltar. She was refloated on 11 June and taken in to Margate, Kent.
Perseverance	United Kingdom	The ship was lost near Port Patrick, Wigtownshire. She was on a voyage from Limerick to Liverpool, Lancashire.

== July ==
=== 2 July ===
List of shipwrecks: 2 July 1814
Ship	State	Description
Devonshire	British East India Company	The East Indiaman capsized off Sagar Island in a squall with the loss of 29 lives.

=== 3 July ===
List of shipwrecks: 3 July 1814
Ship	State	Description
Morning Star	India	The ship was wrecked in the Torres Strait with the ultimate loss of 32 of her 38 crew. The six survivors were rescued from Booby Island by Eliza ( (United Kingdom of Great Britain and Ireland) New South Wales) on 30 September.

=== 4 July ===
List of shipwrecks: 4 July 1814
Ship	State	Description
Ann & Harriet	United Kingdom	The ship was lost near Cape Race, Newfoundland, British North America. She was on a voyage from Halifax, Nova Scotia to St. John's, Newfoundland.

=== 5 July ===
List of shipwrecks: 5 July 1814
Ship	State	Description
Stranger	United Kingdom	War of 1812: The ship was captured in the Atlantic Ocean 4 leagues (12 nautical miles (22 km)) north west of Flores Island, Azores, Portugal by USS Peacock (United States Navy) while on a voyage from Buenos Aires to Greenock, Renfrewshire. She was set afire and sunk.

=== 6 July ===
List of shipwrecks: 6 July 1814
Ship	State	Description
Rambler	United Kingdom	The ship ran aground on the Hoyle Bank, in Liverpool Bay. She was on a voyage from Liverpool, Lancashire, to Bilbao, Spain. She was refloated on 15 July and taken in to Liverpool.

=== 8 July ===
List of shipwrecks: 8 July 1814
Ship	State	Description
Unity	United Kingdom	The ship was run down and sunk off Mundesley, Norfolk. Her crew were rescued. She was on a voyage from Rye, Sussex, to Leith, Lothian.

=== 9 July ===
List of shipwrecks: 9 July 1814
Ship	State	Description
Jane	United Kingdom	War of 1812: The ship was captured and burnt by the privateer Prince of Neufchatel (United States). She was on a voyage from Saint-Jean-de-Luz, Basses-Pyrénées, France to Falmouth, Cornwall.
Medina	United Kingdom	The ship was driven ashore near Folkestone, Kent. She was on a voyage from Jamaica to London. She was refloated the next day.
Recovery	United Kingdom	The ship was driven ashore at Folkestone. She was refloated the next day.

=== 11 July ===
List of shipwrecks: 11 July 1814
Ship	State	Description
Alert	(United Kingdom of Great Britain and Ireland) Bermuda	The ship capsized and sank in the Atlantic Ocean (20°18′N 60°21′W). Her crew were rescued by Governor Hodgson (United Kingdom).
Steady	United Kingdom	War of 1812: The ship was captured and burnt in the Atlantic Ocean (49°10′N 9°00′W) by the privateer Prince de Neufchatel (United States). She was on a voyage from Bordeaux, Gironde, France to Newfoundland, British North America.

=== 18 July ===
List of shipwrecks: 18 July 1814
Ship	State	Description
Britannia	United Kingdom	War of 1812: The snow was captured and burnt in the Grand Banks of Newfoundland by the privateer Mammoth (United States). She was on a voyage from St. Andrews, New Brunswick, British North America to Liverpool, Lancashire.
Eliza	(United Kingdom of Great Britain and Ireland) Antigua	War of 1812: The sloop was captured and scuttled off Guadeloupe by an American privateer.

=== 19 July ===
List of shipwrecks: 19 July 1814
Ship	State	Description
Eliza	United Kingdom	The ship was driven ashore and wrecked on the Mull of Kintyre. She was on a voyage from Bristol, Gloucestershire, to Saint Petersburg, Russia.

=== 20 July ===
List of shipwrecks: 20 July 1814
Ship	State	Description
Dolphin	Sweden	The ship was wrecked at the mouth of the Gironde. She was on a voyage from Stockholm to Bordeaux, Gironde.
Indefatigable	United Kingdom	The ship was wrecked on the coast of Cuba. Her crew survived. She was on a voyage from Jamaica to London.

=== 21 July ===
List of shipwrecks: 21 July 1814
Ship	State	Description
Francis	United Kingdom	War of 1812: The ship was captured and burnt by the privateer Ida (United States). She was on a voyage from Newfoundland, British North America to Figueira da Foz, Portugal.

=== 22 July ===
List of shipwrecks: 22 July 1814
Ship	State	Description
Triton	United Kingdom	War of 1812: The ship was captured off Cape St. Vincent, Portugal by the privateer Prince of Neufchatel (United States). An attempt was made to scuttle her. She was later taken in to Gibraltar in a waterlogged condition by HMS Tuscan (Royal Navy). Triton was on a voyage from Cádiz, Spain to London.

=== 23 July ===
List of shipwrecks: 23 July 1814
Ship	State	Description
HMS Peacock	Royal Navy	War of 1812: The sloop-of-war disappeared off the Virginia Capes, apparently foundering on this date.

=== 24 July ===
List of shipwrecks: 24 July 1814
Ship	State	Description
Arun	United Kingdom	War of 1812: The transport ship was captured and sunk by the privateer Prince of Neufchatel (United States) while on a voyage from Gibraltar to Lisbon, Portugal.
Ann and Eliza	United Kingdom	War of 1812: The brig was captured by the privateer Mammoth (United States) while on a voyage from Newfoundland, British North America to Miramichi Bay. She was set afire and sunk.

=== 25 July ===
List of shipwrecks: 25 July 1814
Ship	State	Description
Urania	United Kingdom	War of 1812: The brig was captured by the privateer Mammoth (United States) while on a voyage from Newfoundland, British North America to the Saint Lawrence River. She was set afire and sunk.

=== 26 July ===
List of shipwrecks: 26 July 1814
Ship	State	Description
Ainsley	United Kingdom	War of 1812: The brig was captured by the privateer Mammoth (United States) while on a voyage from Quebec, British North America to Barbados. She was scuttled.
Americano	Spain	The ship was wrecked on the Florida reefs while on a voyage from Havana, Cuba to Lisbon, Portugal.
Favorite	United Kingdom	War of 1812: The ship was captured and scuttled by the privateers Chasseur, David Porter and Whig (all United States). She was on a voyage from Tenerife, Canary Islands, to London.

=== 27 July ===
List of shipwrecks: 27 July 1814
Ship	State	Description
Prudence	United Kingdom	The ship was captured and scuttled by the privateers Chasseur, David Porter and Whig (all United States). She was on a voyage from Tenerife, Canary Islands, to London.

=== 28 July ===
List of shipwrecks: 28 July 1814
Ship	State	Description
Apollo	United Kingdom	War of 1812: The ship was captured and burnt by the privateer Prince of Neufchatel (United States). she was on a voyage from St. Ubes, Portugal to Riga, Russia.

=== 29 July ===
List of shipwrecks: 29 July 1814
Ship	State	Description
Hero	United Kingdom	The transport ship was wrecked at Ostend, East Flanders, Netherlands. Her crew were rescued.
Joseph	United Kingdom	The ship was driven ashore near Lymington, Hampshire. She was on a voyage from London.

=== 30 July ===
List of shipwrecks: 30 July 1814
Ship	State	Description
Indefatiguable	United Kingdom	The ship was wrecked on the coast of Cuba. She was on a voyage from Jamaica to London.
Susannah Christian	Stettin	The ship was driven ashore and wrecked on Bornholm, Denmark. She was on a voyage from Memel, Prussia to Dartmouth, Devon, United Kingdom.

=== 31 July ===
List of shipwrecks: 31 July 1814
Ship	State	Description
Fly	United Kingdom	The ship was towed in to Figueira da Foz Portugal in a waterlogged condition. She was on a voyage from London to Lisbon, Portugal.

=== Unknown date ===
List of shipwrecks: Unknown date in July 1814
Ship	State	Description
Crown Prince	United Kingdom	War of 1812: The ship was captured and sunk by USS Rattlesnake (United States Navy) before 11 July. She was on a voyage from Newfoundland, British North America to Alicante, Spain.
Glass Merchant	United Kingdom	The ship was in collision with another vessel and sank in Hollesley Bay, Suffolk.
Jacob & Catharine	France	The ship was driven ashore near Ostend, East Flanders, Netherlands.
Nordkoping	Sweden	The ship was lost near Nantucket, Massachusetts, United States. She was on a voyage from St Jago de Cuba to Boston, Massachusetts.
Steady	United Kingdom	War of 1812: The ship was captured in the Atlantic Ocean off Cape Finisterre, Spain by the privateer Swordfish (United States). She was set afire and sunk.
Unnamed	Flag unknown	The ship foundered off Blankenberge, West Flanders, Netherlands with the loss of all hands.

== August ==
=== 1 August ===
List of shipwrecks: 1 August 1814
Ship	State	Description
Sarah	United Kingdom	War of 1812: The brig was captured in the Atlantic Ocean (47°13′N 32°00′W) by the privateer Mammoth (United States) while on a voyage from Cork to Quebec, British North America. She was set afire and sunk.

=== 3 August ===
List of shipwrecks: 3 August 1814
Ship	State	Description
Roe	United Kingdom	The ship was driven ashore and wrecked at Liverpool, Lancashire. She was on a voyage from Liverpool to Pensacola, East Florida, New Spain.

=== 6 August ===
List of shipwrecks: 6 August 1814
Ship	State	Description
Robert	United Kingdom	The ship foundered in the Atlantic Ocean. Her crew were rescued by Carricks (United Kingdom). She was on a voyage from Liverpool, Lancashire, to Pictou, Nova Scotia, British North America.

=== 7 August ===
List of shipwrecks: 7 August 1814
Ship	State	Description
Charles	United Kingdom	The ship was abandoned whilst on a voyage from Guadeloupe to Glasgow, Renfrewshire. Her crew were rescued by Severn and St. Vincent (both United Kingdom).
Resolution	United Kingdom	The ship foundered off Lamlash, Isle of Arran. Her crew survived.
Robert	United Kingdom	The ship foundered. Her crew were rescued. She was on a voyage from Liverpool, Lancashire, to Pictou, Nova Scotia, British North America.

=== 8 August ===
List of shipwrecks: 8 August 1814
Ship	State	Description
Brothers	United Kingdom	War of 1812: The ship was captured and burnt off Cape Sable Island, Nova Scotia, British North America by the privateer Grand Turk (United States). She was on a voyage from Saint John, New Brunswick, British North America to Liverpool, Lancashire.
Juno	United Kingdom	The ship ran aground on the Swin Bottoms, in the North Sea and was wrecked. Her crew were rescued. She was on a voyage from Liverpool, Lancashire, to a Baltic port.
Retreat	British East India Company	The East Indiaman was driven ashore at Shoeburyness, Essex. She was on a voyage from Bengal, India to London. Retreat was later refloated and taken in to Blackwall, Middlesex.
Samuel Cumming	United Kingdom	The ship departed from Havana, Cuba for Liverpool, Lancashire. No further trace, presumed foundered with the loss of all hands.

=== 10 August ===
List of shipwrecks: 10 August 1814
Ship	State	Description
Nostra Señora del Carmen	United Kingdom	The ship capsized at A Coruña. She was declared a total loss.

=== 11 August ===
List of shipwrecks: 11 August 1814
Ship	State	Description
London	United Kingdom	War of 1812: The ship was captured and burnt by the privateer Whig (United States). She was on a voyage from Miramichi, New Brunswick, British North America to Liverpool, Lancashire.

=== 12 August ===
List of shipwrecks: 12 August 1814
Ship	State	Description
General Hunter	United Kingdom	War of 1812: The ship was captured and burnt by an American privateer 10 leagues (30 nautical miles (56 km) south west of Baltimore, County Cork. She was on a voyage from Miramichi, New Brunswick, British North America to Bristol, Gloucestershire.
Montezuma	United Kingdom	The ship was wrecked on Mistaken Point, Newfoundland, British North America. She was on a voyage from Merigomish, Nova Scotia, British North America to Greenock, Renfrewshire.

=== 14 August ===
List of shipwrecks: 14 August 1814
Ship	State	Description
George	United Kingdom	War of 1812: The ship was captured and sunk by the privateer Prince of Neufchatel (United States). She was on a voyage from Milford Haven, Pembrokeshire, to Bristol, Gloucestershire.
HMS Nancy	Royal Navy	War of 1812: The schooner was set afire and scuttled in the Nottawasaga River to prevent her capture by the Americans.
William	United Kingdom	War of 1812: The ship was captured and sunk by USS Peacock (United States Navy). She was on a voyage from St. Andrews, New Brunswick, British North America to Greenock, Renfrewshire.

=== 17 August ===
List of shipwrecks: 19 August 1814
Ship	State	Description
USS Adams	United States Navy	The frigate struck a rock off the "Isle of Holt". She put in to "Buckstown" in a severely leaky condition on 19 August. Subsequently taken to Hampden, Massachusetts.

=== 19 August ===
List of shipwrecks: 19 August 1814
Ship	State	Description
Albion	United Kingdom	War of 1812: The ship was captured in the Atlantic Ocean by the privateer Prince of Neufchatel (United States). She was set afire and sunk. Albion was on a voyage from the Clyde to Quebec, British North America.

=== 20 August ===
List of shipwrecks: 20 August 1814
Ship	State	Description
Active Jane	United Kingdom	The ship was driven ashore and severely damaged at Liverpool, Lancashire. She was on a voyage from Liverpool to Rio de Janeiro. Active Jane was later refloated and taken in to Liverpool.
Hope	United Kingdom	The ship ran aground and was severely damaged whilst on a voyage from Faial Island, Azores, to Rio de Janeiro. She was refloated and made for Pernambuco, Colonial Brazil.

=== 21 August ===
List of shipwrecks: 21 August 1814
Ship	State	Description
Brilliant	United Kingdom	The ship struck a rock and sank at Donaghadee, County Down. Her crew were rescued. She was on a voyage from Harrington, Cumberland, to Belfast, County Antrim.
Fly	United Kingdom	War of 1812: The ship was captured and burnt off Cabo Mondego, Portugal by the privateer Yankee (United States).
USS Scorpion	United States Navy	War of 1812, Battle of Queen Anne: The floating artillery battery, a sloop, was burnt and scuttled in the Patuxent River near Upper Marlboro, Maryland, to prevent capture by the Royal Navy.

=== 22 August ===
List of shipwrecks: 22 August 1814
Ship	State	Description
Bellona	(United Kingdom of Great Britain and Ireland) Jersey	War of 1812: The ship was captured and sunk in the Atlantic Ocean off Cabo da Roca, Portugal by USS Peacock (United States Navy). She was on a voyage from the Mediterranean to Jersey.
Elizabeth	United Kingdom	The ship was driven ashore at Clonakilty, County Cork. She was on a voyage from Quebec, British North America to Cork. She was refloated in early September.

=== 23 August ===
List of shipwrecks: 23 August 1814
Ship	State	Description
USS Gunboat No. 146	United States Navy	The gunboat was sunk by a magazine explosion.
Triton	United Kingdom	War of 1812: The ship was captured and sunk in the Atlantic Ocean 80 nautical miles (150 km) west of Cabo da Roca, Portugal by USS Peacock (United States Navy).

=== 24 August ===
List of shipwrecks: 24 August 1814
Ship	State	Description
Isabella	United Kingdom	The ship was driven ashore in Lunan Bay.
Pike	United States	War of 1812: The privateer was driven ashore and then destroyed by HMS Dotterell (Royal Navy).

=== 25 August ===
List of shipwrecks: 25 August 1814
Ship	State	Description
Enigheidt	Sweden	The ship ran aground on the Haisborough Sands, in the North Sea off the coast of Norfolk, United Kingdom and was abandoned by her crew. She subsequently refloated and drifted out to sea.
Mars	United Kingdom	The ship was destroyed by fire in the Irish Sea. She was on a voyage from Liverpool, Lancashire, to Quebec City, Lower Canada, British North America.
Unnamed	Flag unknown	The ship ran aground on the Goodwin Sands. She was on a voyage from Hamburg to London, United Kingdom. She was refloated.

=== 26 August ===
List of shipwrecks: 26 August 1814
Ship	State	Description
Diana	United Kingdom	The ship was driven ashore at Winterton-on-Sea, Norfolk.
Unnamed	(United Kingdom of Great Britain and Ireland) Jersey	War of 1812: The brig was discovered crewless in the Atlantic Ocean. She was on a voyage from Jersey to Newfoundland, British North America. Presumed to have been plundered by an American privateer, she was towed in to the Isles of Scilly.

=== 27 August ===
List of shipwrecks: 27 August 1814
Ship	State	Description
Amizade	Portugal	The ship was driven ashore and wrecked on Læsø, Denmark. She was on a voyage from Saint Petersburg, Russia to Lisbon.
Athol	United Kingdom	The ship foundered in the Formby Channel. She was on a voyage from Limerick to Liverpool, Lancashire.
Treton	Sweden	The ship ran aground on the Goodwin Sands, Kent, United Kingdom. She was on a voyage from Norrköping to Nantes Loire-Inférieure, France. She was refloated and taken in to Ramsgate, Kent.

=== 28 August ===
List of shipwrecks: 28 August 1814
Ship	State	Description
Hayle	United Kingdom	The ship was driven ashore near Helsingør, Denmark. She was on a voyage from Saint Petersburg, Russia to Newcastle upon Tyne, Northumberland. Hayle was later refloated.
Enigheidt	Sweden	The ship ran aground on the Haisborough Sands, in the North Sea and was abandoned by her crew. She subsequently floated off and drifted out to sea.
Unnamed	United Kingdom	The transport ship was wrecked near Ostend, East Flanders, Netherlands. Her crew were rescued.

=== 29 August ===
List of shipwrecks: 29 August 1814
Ship	State	Description
Diana	United Kingdom	The ship was driven ashore at Winterton-on-Sea, Norfolk.
Lettice	United Kingdom	War of 1812: The ship was captured and sunk by USS Wasp (United States Navy). Lettice was on a voyage from Bayonne, Loire-Inférieure, France to Liverpool, Lancashire.
HMS Peacock	Royal Navy	The Sloop foundered off South Carolina with all hands.

=== 30 August ===
List of shipwrecks: 30 August 1814
Ship	State	Description
Bon Accord	United Kingdom	War of 1812: The ship was captured and sunk by USS Wasp (United States Navy). Bon Accord was on a voyage from Seville, Spain to Lisbon, Portugal and London.
Charlotte	United Kingdom	War of 1812: The ship was captured and sunk by the privateer Prince of Neufchatel (United States). She was on a voyage from Rio de Janeiro to Greenock, Renfrewshire.

== =31 August ==
List of shipwrecks: 31 August 1814
Ship	State	Description
Planter	United Kingdom	The ship ran aground on the Newcombe Sand, in the North Sea off the coast of Norfolk. She was on a voyage from Saint Petersburg, Russia to London She was refloated the next day and resumed her voyage.

=== Unknown date ===
List of shipwrecks: Unknown date in August 1814
Ship	State	Description	
Alexander	United Kingdom	War of 1812: The ship was captured by the privateer Ida ({{#invoke|flag	1795}}) before 9 August and was abandoned. Alexander was on a voyage from Miramichi, New Brunswich, Britishs North America to Ayr.
Alliance	Danzig	The ship was lost off Terschelling, Friesland, Netherlands. She was on a voyage from Danzig to Porto, Portugal.	
Caroline	United Kingdom	The ship was driven ashore at Bembridge, Isle of Wight. She was on a voyage from London to Demerara. Caroline was refloated on 26 August and taken in to Portsmouth, Hampshire.	
Colnettes	Flag unknown	The ship was driven ashore on Texel, North Holland, Netherlands.	
Cossack	Spain	The brig foundered in the Atlantic Ocean. Her crew were rescued by Minerva (United Kingdom). Cossack was on a voyage from America to Greenock.	
Fama	Hamburg	The ship ran aground on the South Sand Head. She was on a voyage from Rotterdam, South Holland, Netherlands to Liverpool, Lancashire, United Kingdom. She was reflloated with assistance, and taken in to Ramsgate, Kent, United Kingdom on 26 August.	
Favourite	United Kingdom	War of 1812: The ship was captured and sunk by USS Adams (United States Navy) before 16 August. She was on a voyage from a French port to Newfoundland, British North America.	
Francis	United Kingdom	War of 1812: The schooner was captured by the privateer Ida (United States) before 9 August. She was set afire and sunk.	
Juffrow Hendrika	Elbing	The ship was driven ashore. She was on a voyage from Elbing to London, United Kingdom. She was refloated and taken in to copenhagen, Denmark in a leaky condition.	
Maria	United Kingdom	War of 1812: The ship was captured and sunk by USS Adams (United States Navy) before 16 August. She was on a voyage from St. Andrews, Fife to St. John's, Newfoundland.	
Milnes	United Kingdom	War of 1812: The sloop was captured in the Atlantic Ocean by the privateer Surprise (United States) while on a voyage from Cork to Miramichi Bay. She was set afire and sunk.	
Minerva	Netherlands	The ship was driven ashore at Dragør, Denmark. She was on a voyage from Saint Petersburg, Russia to Amsterdam, North Holland. Minerva was later refloated and taken in to Copenhagen, Denmark.	
Nuestra Señora del Carmen	Spain	The ship capsized at A Coruña before 10 August and was wrecked.	
Paris	United Kingdom	War of 1812: The ship was captured and sunk by USS Adams (United States Navy) before 16 August. She was on a voyage from Quebec, British North America to London.	
Queen Charlotte	United Kingdom	War of 1812: The schooner was captured in the Atlantic Ocean by the privateer Surprise (United States) while on a voyage from St. John's, Newfoundland, British North America to Liverpool, Lancashire. She was set afire and sunk.	
Rose	United Kingdom	The ship was lost on Attwood's Key. She was on a voyage from Port-au-Prince, Haiti to Hamburg.	
Unnamed	United Kingdom	The ship was wrecked on Prince Edward Island, British North America.	

== September ==
=== 1 September ===
List of shipwrecks: 1 September 1814
Ship	State	Description
HMS Avon	Royal Navy	USS Wasp and HMS Avon. War of 1812: The Cruizer-class brig-sloop was sunk in the English Channel during an engagement with USS Wasp (United States Navy). HMS Castilian (Royal Navy) rescued the survivors.
Mary	United Kingdom	War of 1812: The brig was captured in the Atlantic Ocean by USS Peacock (United States Navy) while on a voyage from Gibraltar to Woolwich, Kent. She was set afire and sunk.

=== 2 September ===
List of shipwrecks: 2 September 1814
Ship	State	Description
Aurora	United Kingdom	The ship ran aground on the Burbo Bank, in Liverpool Bay and was severely damaged. She was later refloated and taken in to Liverpool, Lancashire, in a sinking condition. Aurora was on a voyage from Havana, Cuba to Liverpool.
Flying Fish	United Kingdom	The ship was driven ashore, capsized and sank at "Williamstadt". She was on a voyage from Bordeaux, Gironde, France to Rotterdam, South Holland, Netherlands.
Jane	United Kingdom	The ship foundered off Land's End, Cornwall with the loss of all hands.

=== 3 September ===
List of shipwrecks: 3 September 1814
Ship	State	Description
USS Adams	United States Navy	War of 1812, Battle of Hampden: The frigate was scuttled at Hampden, Massachusetts to prevent her capture by the Royal Navy.
HMS Bacchus	Royal Navy	The Cruizer-class brig-sloop was driven ashore on Spike Island, County Cork. Later refloated, repaired and returned to service.
Concordia	Sweden	The ship was driven ashore at Swinemünde, Prussia. She was on a voyage from Helsingborg to Gothenburg.
Decateur	United States	War of 1812, Battle of Hampden: The privateer was captured and destroyed at Bangor, Maine.
Elmire	Prussia	The ship was driven ashore at Swinemüne. She was on a voyage from Swinemünde to Hull, Yorkshire, United Kingdom.
Freundschaft	Prussia	The ship was driven ashore at Swinemünde. She was on a voyage from Swinemünde to London, United Kingdom.
Fride	Danzig	The ship foundered in the Baltic Sea off Greifswald. She was on a voyage from Danzig to Liverpool, Lancashire, United Kingdom.
Gode Hope	Netherlands	The ship was driven ashore at Swinemünde. She was on a voyage from Kuressaare, Russia to Amsterdam, South Holland.
Maria	Russia	The ship was driven ashore at Swinemünde. She was on a voyage from Saint Petersburg to Swinemünde.
Mathilde Louisa	Prussia	The ship was driven ashore at Swinemünde. She was on a voyage from Saint Petersburg to Swinemünde.
Pusma	Russia	The ship was driven ashore at Pillau, Prussia.
Richard	Prussia	The ship was driven ashore at Swinemünde. She was on a voyage from Swinemünde to Bordeaux, Gironde, France.

=== 4 September ===
List of shipwrecks: 4 September 1814
Ship	State	Description
Acri	United Kingdom	The ship was driven ashore at Danzig.
Alcibeades	United Kingdom	The ship was driven ashore at Danzig.
Alexander	Danzig	The ship was driven ashore at Danzig.
Anvertrette	Danzig	The ship was driven ashore at Danzig.
Belfield	United Kingdom	War of 1812: The ship was captured and sunk in the Atlantic Ocean (45°54′N 46°45′W) by the privateer Scourge (United States). She was on a voyage from Quebec, British North America to Leith, Lothian.
Carolina Henrietta	Danzig	The ship was driven ashore at Danzig. She was on a voyage from Danzig to London, United Kingdom.
Division	Danzig	The ship was driven ashore at Danzig. She was on a voyage from London to Danzig.
Elizabeth	Prussia	The ship was driven ashore at Danzig. She was on a voyage from Pillau to Danzig.
Elizabeth	United Kingdom	The transport ship was driven ashore at Danzig.
Etheldred	United Kingdom	The transport ship was driven ashore at Danzig.
Florentine	Danzig	The ship was driven ashore at Danzig. She was on a voyage from Danzig to Hull, Yorkshire, United Kingdom.
George	United Kingdom	The ship was driven ashore at Danzig. She was on a voyage from Danzig to Leith.
Harald	United Kingdom	The transport ship struck a rock. She put in to the Isles of Scilly in a leaky condition.
Jacob	Danzig	The ship was driven ashore at Danzig.
Jane	United Kingdom	The transport ship was driven ashore at Danzig.
Jurgen & Jacob	Danzig	The ship was driven ashore at Danzig. She was on a voyage from Danzig to Liverpool, Lancashire, United Kingdom.
Neptune	United Kingdom	War of 1812: The ship was captured and sunk by the privateer Amelia (United States). Neptune was on a voyage from Greenock, Renfrewshire, to Newfoundland, British North America.
Resburger	Danzig	The ship was driven ashore at Danzig.
Twee Gebroeders	Danzig	The ship was driven ashore at Danzig.

=== 5 September ===
List of shipwrecks: 5 September 1814
Ship	State	Description
Lively	United Kingdom	War of 1812: The ship was captured in the Atlantic Ocean by the privateer Surprise (United States). She was set afire and sunk.
32 unnamed vessels	Flags unknown	Twenty-six ships sank and six were wrecked at Ancona, Papal States with the loss of 40 lives.

=== 8 September ===
List of shipwrecks: 8 September 1814
Ship	State	Description
Eliza	United Kingdom	War of 1812: The ship was captured off Lanzarote by two schooner privateers. She was on a voyage from the Canary Islands to London. Eliza was subsequently run ashore on the African coast.
Ellen	United Kingdom	The ship was driven ashore and wrecked at Bolderāja, Russia.
Friends	United Kingdom	The ship struck a rock off Götaland, Sweden and was abandoned by her crew. She was subsequently discovered by Charlotte (Russia) and taken in to Pillau, Prussia.
Lord Wellington	United Kingdom	The ship was driven ashore and wrecked at Bolderāja. She was on a voyage from Riga, Russia to Lisbon, Portugal.
Two Friends	United Kingdom	The ship foundered in the North Sea off Mundesley, Norfolk.
Unnamed	United Kingdom	The ship was wrecked on the Burnham Flats, Norfolk.
Unnamed	United Kingdom	The sloop ran aground at Blakeney, Norfolk and was wrecked.

=== 9 September ===
List of shipwrecks: 9 September 1814
Ship	State	Description
Denton	United Kingdom	The ship was lost in the Gulf of Finland. She was on a voyage from Newcastle upon Tyne, Northumberland to Saint Petersburg, Russia.
Unnamed	French Navy	The gunboat was wrecked near Calais. Her crew were rescued. She was on a voyage from Antwerp, Netherlands to Brest, Finistère.

=== 10 September ===
List of shipwrecks: 10 September 1814
Ship	State	Description
Boa Esperanza	Portugal	The ship was lost at Cadzandt, Zeeland, Netherlands. She was on a voyage from St. Ubes to Rotterdam, South Holland, Netherlands.
John & Mary	United Kingdom	The ship was driven ashore on Læsø, Denmark. She was on a voyage from Saint Petersburg, Russia to London. John & Mary was later refloated and towed in to Gothenburg, Sweden.
Penelope	United Kingdom	The ship was wrecked on the Graunmana Rocks. She was on a voyage from Saint John, New Brunswick, British North America to Glasgow, Renfrewshire.

=== 11 September ===
List of shipwrecks: 11 September 1814
Ship	State	Description
HMS Confiance	Royal Navy	War of 1812, Battle of Lake Champlain: The fifth rate ran aground off Plattsburg, New York, United States. She was captured by the Americans and taken in to service as USS Confiance.
Hopewell	United Kingdom	The ship was in collision with another vessel. She was subsequently driven ashore and wrecked at Bacton, Norfolk. Hopewell was on a voyage from London to Leeds, Yorkshire.
HMS Linnet	Royal Navy	War of 1812, Battle of Lake Champlain: The brig ran aground off Plattsburg. She was captured by the Americans and taken in to service as USS Linnet.

=== 12 September ===
List of shipwrecks: 12 September 1814
Ship	State	Description
Three Brothers	United Kingdom	War of 1812: The ship was captured and sunk in the Atlantic Ocean (37°54′N 16°45′W by USS Wasp (United States Navy). She was on a voyage from the Canary Islands to London.

=== 13 September ===
List of shipwrecks: 13 September 1814
Ship	State	Description
Départment des Landes	French Navy	The corvette struck a rock at Brest, Finistère and was damaged. She was decommissioned on 30 November.
Douglas	United Kingdom	War of 1812: The ship, which had been captured on 6 September by the privateer Prince of Neufchatel (United States), was deliberately run ashore at Nantucket, Massachusetts, United States and wrecked.
Lady Juliana	United Kingdom	The ship was driven ashore near Helsingør, Denmark. She was on a voyage from Saint Petersburg, Russia to Portsmouth, Hampshire. She was later refloated.
Lark	(United Kingdom of Great Britain and Ireland) Jamaica	The schooner sprang a leak and was abandoned off Cuba with the loss of four of her eight crew.
William Manning	United Kingdom	The ship was wrecked near Öregrund, Sweden. Her crew were rescued.

=== 14 September ===
List of shipwrecks: 14 September 1814
Ship	State	Description
Adventure	United Kingdom	The ship was driven ashore at Arkhangelsk, Russia. She was later refloated.
Bacchus	United Kingdom	War of 1812: The ship was captured and sunk in the Atlantic Ocean (37°30′N 11°00′W) by USS Wasp (United States Navy). She was on a voyage from Newfoundland, British North America to Gibraltar.

=== 15 September ===
List of shipwrecks: 15 September 1814
Ship	State	Description
HMS Hermes	Royal Navy	War of 1812: The sloop-of-war ran aground under the guns of Fort Bowyer off Mobile Point on the coast of Alabama. Her crew set fire to her and abandoned her, and she exploded when the fire reached her gunpowder magazine.

=== 17 September ===
List of shipwrecks: 17 September 1814
Ship	State	Description
Helen	India	The ship ran aground and was wrecked in the Bengal River. She was on a voyage from Bengal to New South Wales.

=== 18 September ===
List of shipwrecks: 18 September 1814
Ship	State	Description
Feodosiya (Феодосия, 'Theodosia')	Imperial Russian Navy	The transport ship, a yacht, was driven ashore on the eastern side of Hogland. Her crew were rescued. She was on a voyage from Narva to Reval. She had sunk by 20 September.
Mortimer	United Kingdom	The ship departed Pictou, Nova Scotia, British North America for Hull, Yorkshire. No further trace, presumed foundered with the loss of all hands.
Trafalgar	United Kingdom	The ship ran aground on the Goodwin Sands, Kent. She was on a voyage from Rotterdam, South Holland, Netherlands to Liverpool, Lancashire. She was refloated with assistance on 20 August and taken in to Ramsgate, Kent.

=== 19 September ===
List of shipwrecks: 19 September 1814
Ship	State	Description
Blagodat (Благодать, 'Grace')	Imperial Russian Navy	The transport ship, a yacht, was beached near Kalvi, Governorate of Estonia, due to unrecoverable damage to steering. Her eleven crew survived.
Ioann (Иоанн, 'John')	Imperial Russian Navy	The galiot had on 10 September sprung a severe leak, and due to risk of hull disintegration was beached and subsequently wrecked near Maidla, Governorate of Estonia. She was on a voyage from Narva to Reval. Her crew were rescued.
La Mamette	France	The ship foundered of Roscoff, Finistère with the loss of all on board.

=== 20 September ===
List of shipwrecks: 20 September 1814
Ship	State	Description
Helena	Prussia	The ship was lost off Great Yarmouth, Norfolk, United Kingdom.

=== 21 September ===
List of shipwrecks: 21 September 1814
Ship	State	Description
Ann	United Kingdom	The ship was wrecked near "Worberg". She was on a voyage from "Wyburg" to Belfast, County Antrim.

=== 23 September ===
List of shipwrecks: 23 September 1814
Ship	State	Description
№ 140	United States Navy	The gunboat was lost at Ocracoke, North Carolina.

=== 24 September ===
List of shipwrecks: 24 September 1814
Ship	State	Description
Pike	United States	The privateer was driven ashore and destroyed by HMS Dotterel (Royal Navy).
Sarah	United Kingdom	The ship was driven ashore on Ameland, Friesland, Netherlands. She was on a voyage from Dublin to Hamburg. She was refloated with the assistance of a fishing boat.

=== 25 September ===
List of shipwrecks: 25 September 1814
Ship	State	Description
Fountain	United Kingdom	The collier, a brig, was driven ashore at Brighton, Sussex. She was refloated on 30 September and discovered to be leaking. While making for Shoreham-by-Sea she capsized and foundered off Hove with the loss of two of her crew.

=== 27 September ===
List of shipwrecks: 27 September 1814
Ship	State	Description
Catherine and William	United Kingdom	War of 1812: The ship, which had been captured by the privateer Grampus (United States), was wrecked at Beaufort, South Carolina. She had been on a voyage from Bahia, Brazil to Gibraltar.
General Armstrong	United States	General Armstrong. War of 1812, Battle of Fayal: The privateer, a brig, was scuttled at Fayal, Azores, Portugal following an engagement with HMS Carnation, HMS Plantagenet and HMS Rota (all Royal Navy) in which two of her crew were killed.

=== 28 September ===
List of shipwrecks: 28 September 1814
Ship	State	Description
Margaret	United Kingdom	The ship, which had sprung a leak six day previous, foundered in the Atlantic Ocean. Her crew were rescued by Susan (United Kingdom). Margaret was on a voyage from London to Quebec, Lower Canada, British North America.

=== 30 September ===
List of shipwrecks: 30 September 1814
Ship	State	Description
Christina Eliza	(Sweden) Swedish Wismar	The ship was driven ashore and wrecked at Riga, Russia. She was on a voyage from Riga to Wismar.
Concordia	Netherlands	The ship was driven ashore and wrecked at Riga. She was on a voyage from Riga to a Dutch port.
Ellen	United Kingdom	The ship was driven ashore and wrecked at Riga. She was on a voyage from Riga to Sheerness, Kent.
Lord Wellington	United Kingdom	The ship was driven ashore and wrecked at Riga. She was on a voyage from Riga to Lisbon, Portugal.
Mary Ann	United Kingdom	War of 1812: The ship was captured and sunk by the privateer Prince of Neufchatel (United States). She was on a voyage from Saint John, New Brunswick, British North America to Barbados.
16 unnamed vessels	United Kingdom	The ships were driven ashore or wrecked at Narva, Russia.

=== Unknown date ===
List of shipwrecks: Unknown date in September 1814
Ship	State	Description
Ajax	United Kingdom	The ship was wrecked on Öland, Sweden. She was on a voyage from Stockholm, Sweden to Aberdeen.
Aschher	Prussia	The schooner was driven ashore near Stolpmünde.
Christian and Mary	United Kingdom	The ship ran aground on the Newcombe Sand, in the North Sea off the coast of Norfolk. She was on a voyage from Newcastle upon Tyne, Northumberland to "Villa Conda". She was refloated with assistance and taken in to Harwich, Essex.
HMS Crane	Royal Navy	The Cruizer-class brig-sloop foundered while on a voyage from Bermuda to British North America.
Endeavour	United Kingdom	War of 1812: The transport ship was captured on 2 September by the privateer Surprise (United States) while on a voyage from Sydney, Nova Scotia, British North America to St. John's, Newfoundland, British North America. She was subsequently driven ashore and destroyed at New York City, United States by a United States Navy frigate.
Experiment	Danzig	The ship was driven ashore at Swinemünde, Prussia between 3 and 5 September.
Freide	Danzig	The ship was lost near Greifswald. She was on a voyage from Danzig to Liverpool, Lancashire, United Kingdom.
Friends	United Kingdom	The ship was abandoned off Götaland, Sweden. She was subsequently towed in to Pillau, Prussia.
Golfinho	Portugal	The ship departed from Maranhão, Brazil for Lisbon. No further trace, presumed foundered with the loss of all hands.
Jolly Tar	United Kingdom	The ship was in collision with another vessel and sank while on a voyage from Cork to Halifax, Nova Scotia. Her crew were rescued.
Margaret	United Kingdom	The brig was wrecked off "Lambuskor Island", Russia. Her crew were rescued.
Morning Star	United Kingdom	The ship was wrecked on Boobie Island. She was on a voyage from Port Jackson, New South Wales to Batavia, Netherlands East Indies.
Oak	United Kingdom	The ship was driven ashore and wrecked on Götaland, Sweden. Her crew were rescued. She was on a voyage from Saint Petersburg to Hull, Yorkshire.
Œlus	Prussia	The ship was driven ashore at Swinemünde between 3 and 5 September.
Oscar	United Kingdom	The ship foundered in the Baltic Sea off Danzig in early September. She was on a voyage from Dublin to Hamburg, or Leith to Königsberg, Prussia.
Pallas	Prussia	The ship was driven ashore at Swinemünde before 4 September.
Paragon	United Kingdom	The ship was driven ashore at Swinemünde.
Seven unnamed vessels	Flags unknown	The ships were driven ashore at Swinemünde between 3 and 5 September.
Two unnamed vessels	Kingdom of Lombardy-Venetia	The ships were destroyed by fire at Venice.

== October ==
=== 1 October ===
List of shipwrecks: 1 October 1814
Ship	State	Description
John and Sarah	United Kingdom	The ship sprang a leak and foundered in The Wash off Boston, Lincolnshire. Her crew were rescued by the brig Ark (United Kingdom). John and Sarah was on a voyage from Sunderland, County Durham, to Boston.
Lord Nelson	United Kingdom	The ship departed from Lisbon, Portugal for Madeira. No further trace, presumed foundered with the loss of all hands.
Mary Ann	United Kingdom	The ship was wrecked on The Swin, in the North Sea. Her crew were rescued. She was on a voyage from South Shields, County Durham, to London.
Unnamed	Flag unknown	The ship capsized off the Dudgeon Lightship ( Trinity House) with the loss of all hands.

=== 2 October ===
List of shipwrecks: 2 October 1814
Ship	State	Description
Perseverance	United Kingdom	The ship struck a rock and foundered in the Gulf of Finland.
Unnamed	United States	War of 1812: The coastal trading vessel was one of six vessels cut out of Sackets Harbor, New York by a Royal Navy squadron. She ran aground and was burnt by the Americans.

=== 3 October ===
List of shipwrecks: 3 October 1814
Ship	State	Description
St. Joseph	United Kingdom	The ship was lost at Rouen, Seine-Inférieure, France. She was on a voyage from Rouen to London.

=== 4 October ===
List of shipwrecks: 4 October 1814
Ship	State	Description
Fame	United Kingdom	The ship ran aground and capsized at Swansea, Glamorgan. She was on a voyage from Swansea to the Charente.

=== 6 October ===
List of shipwrecks: 6 October 1814
Ship	State	Description
Aurora	United Kingdom	The ship foundered in the Atlantic Ocean off Loop Head, County Clare. Her crew were rescued. She was on a voyage from Belfast, County Down, to Quebec, British North America.
Newburgh	United Kingdom	The ship departed from Aberdeen for Gothenburg, Sweden. No further trace, presumed foundered with the loss of all hands.

=== 7 October ===
List of shipwrecks: 7 October 1814
Ship	State	Description
Diana	United Kingdom	The ship foundered in the North Sea off "Schevellig". She was on a voyage from Antwerp, Netherlands to London
Elizabeth & Mary	United Kingdom	The ship was wrecked on the Burnham Flats with the loss of fifteen of the nineteen people on board.
Hoop	Norway	The ship was wrecked on the Herd Sand, in the North Sea off the coast of County Durham, United Kingdom. Her crew were rescued by the Shields Lifeboat.
Industry	United Kingdom	The ship was wrecked at Reval, Russia. She was on a voyage from Liverpool, Lancashire, to Saint Petersburg, Russia.
Isabella	United Kingdom	The ship was wrecked on the Herd Sand. Her crew were rescued by the Shields Lifeboat. She was on a voyage from Newcastle upon Tyne, Northumberland to Dundee, Forfarshire.
Pilot	United Kingdom	The smack was run into by a brig 6 or 7 nautical miles (11 or 13 km) north by west of Spurn Point, Yorkshire and was severely damaged. She was on a voyage from London to Leith, Lothian. She put in to Hull, Yorkshire.
Two Brothers	United Kingdom	The ship foundered in the North Sea off the mouth of the River Tees. Her crew were rescued by a lifeboat. She was on a voyage from Sunderland to Stockton-on-Tees, County Durham.

=== 8 October ===
List of shipwrecks: 8 October 1814
Ship	State	Description
Bess	United Kingdom	The ship sank in Liverpool Bay. She was on a voyage from Strangford, County Down, to Liverpool, Lancashire. Bess was refloated on 12 October and taken in to the River Mersey.
Friends	United Kingdom	The ship was driven ashore in Dunnet Bay, Caithness. She was on a voyage from Memel, Prussia to Liverpool.

=== 10 October ===
List of shipwrecks: 10 October 1814
Ship	State	Description
Attention	Denmark	The ship foundered in the Irish Sea off the Calf of Man, Isle of Man. Her thirteen crew were rescued. She was on a voyage from Liverpool, Lancashire, United Kingdom to Copenhagen.
Baring	United Kingdom	The transport ship sank at Beerhaven with the loss of five lives. She was refloated in December 1815.
Lady Lowther	United Kingdom	The ship was driven ashore and wrecked at Seaton Point, Cumberland. Her crew were rescued. She was on a voyage from Liverpool to Carlisle, Cumberland.
HMS Racer	Royal Navy	The schooner foundered in the Gulf of Florida. Her crew were rescued. She was on a voyage from Plymouth, Devon, to the West Indies.
Unnamed	United Kingdom	The ship was wrecked at Ostend, East Flanders, Netherlands.

=== 11 October ===
List of shipwrecks: 11 October 1814
Ship	State	Description
Goodintent	United Kingdom	The ship was driven ashore in St. Brides Bay. She was on a voyage from Teignmouth, Devon, to Liverpool, Lancashire.
John Weston	United Kingdom	The ship was driven ashore on Crane Island, in the Saint Lawrence River, British North America. She was on a voyage from Liverpool to Quebec City, Lower Canada, British North America.
Lady Lowther	United Kingdom	The ship was lost near "Seaton Point". She was on a voyage from Liverpool to Carlisle, Cumberland
Lord Nelson	United Kingdom	War of 1812: The ship was captured in the Atlantic Ocean by the privateer True-blooded Yankee (United States) while on a voyage from London to Madeira, Portugal. She was set afire and sunk.

=== 12 October ===
List of shipwrecks: 12 October 1814
Ship	State	Description
Anna	Russia	The ship was driven ashore in the White Sea. She was on a voyage from Arkhangelsk to Arbroath, Forfarshire, United Kingdom.
Friendship	United Kingdom	The ship was driven ashore on Anholt, Denmark. She was on a voyage from Saint Petersburg, Russia to Bristol, Gloucestershire.
Minerva	United Kingdom	The ship was driven ashore on Anholt. She was on a voyage from Saint Petersburg to Porto, Portugal.

=== 13 October ===
List of shipwrecks: 13 October 1814
Ship	State	Description
Douglas	United Kingdom	War of 1812: The ship, which had been captured by the privateer Prince of Neufchatel (United States) on 6 September, was run ashore on Nantucket Island, Massachusetts, United States. Douglas had been on a voyage from Demerara, British Honduras to Liverpool, Lancashire.
Goulden	United Kingdom	The ship collided with a brig in the River Mersey and sank.

=== 14 October ===
List of shipwrecks: 14 October 1814
Ship	State	Description
Hope	(France) Guadeloupe	The ship was wrecked at Saint-Jean-de-Luz, Basses-Pyrénées, France with the loss of all but one of her crew. She was on a voyage from Guadeloupe to Bordeaux, Gironde, France.

=== 15 October ===
List of shipwrecks: 15 October 1814
Ship	State	Description
Decateur	United States	War of 1812: The schooner was dismasted in a hurricane. She was subsequently captured and destroyed by HMS Ringdove (Royal Navy). Decateur was on a voyage from New York to Saint Barthélemy.
William	United Kingdom	The ship was wrecked on the Haisborough Sands, in the North Sea off the coast of Norfolk. All on board were rescued. She was on a voyage from London to Selby, Yorkshire.

=== 16 October ===
List of shipwrecks: 16 October 1814
Ship	State	Description
Bounty	United Kingdom	The sloop struck a rock and foundered in the Irish Sea off Portavogie, County Down with the loss of all five people on board.
Charles	United Kingdom	The schooner was driven ashore and wrecked at Holyhead, Anglesey, with the loss of one life. She was on a voyage from Bristol, Gloucestershire, to Glasgow, Renfrewshire.
Emanuel	United Kingdom	The ship was abandoned off Heligoland. She was on a voyage from Leith, Lothian, to Hamburg. Emanuel remained afloat and was subsequently taken in to Heligoland.
Neutral	United Kingdom	The brig was driven ashore and wrecked at Bootle, Lancashire. She was on a voyage from Liverpool, Lancashire to Dublin.
Vinidosia	United Kingdom	The ship was driven ashore and wrecked at Liverpool. Her crew were rescued. She was on a voyage from Cork to Liverpool.
Unnamed	United Kingdom	The brig was driven ashore in Bootle Bay. Shje was on a voyage from Liverpool to Dublin.

=== 17 October ===
List of shipwrecks: 17 October 1814
Ship	State	Description
Aurora	Sweden	The ship struck a rock and sank at the mouth of the Loire. Her crew were rescued. She was on a voyage from Plymouth, Devon, United Kingdom to Nantes, Loire-Inférieure, France.
Margaret	United Kingdom	The ship was wrecked on the Falsterbo Reef, Sweden. Her crew were rescued. She was on a voyage from Pärnu, Russia to Liverpool, Lancashire.
Royal George	United Kingdom	The ship was wrecked in St Brides Bay.

=== 18 October ===
List of shipwrecks: 18 October 1814
Ship	State	Description
Eliza	United Kingdom	The ship was run down and sunk in the North Sea off Spurn Point, Yorkshire. Her crew were rescued. She was on a voyage from "Kerwell" to Hull, Yorkshire.
Sovereign	United Kingdom	The transport ship was wrecked on St. Paul Island, British North America with the loss of 199 of the 237 people on board.

=== 19 October ===
List of shipwrecks: 19 October 1814
Ship	State	Description
Little John	United Kingdom	The ship foundered in the Atlantic Ocean off Fowey, Cornwall with the loss of four crew. She was on a voyage from Mevagissey to Fowey.

=== 20 October ===
List of shipwrecks: 20 October 1814
Ship	State	Description
Minerva	United Kingdom	The ship was lost on the Falsterbo Reef, off the coast of Sweden. Her crew were rescued. She was on a voyage from Stettin to London, United Kingdom.
Sir John Sherbrooke	United Kingdom	War of 1812: The ship, which had been captured by the privateer Syren (United States) was driven ashore in the Rockaway Inlet while trying to evade recapture by a Royal Navy frigate. She was set afire and destroyed. Sir John Sherbrooke had been on a voyage from Halifax, Nova Scotia, British North America to Alicante, Spain.

=== 22 October ===
List of shipwrecks: 22 October 1814
Ship	State	Description
Ontario	(United Kingdom of Great Britain and Ireland) British North America	The ship was wrecked near Pladda, Argyllshire. She was on a voyage from Quebec City, Lower Canada, to Greenock, Renfrewshire, United Kingdom.

=== 23 October ===
List of shipwrecks: 23 October 1814
Ship	State	Description
Gratitude	United Kingdom	The transport ship was wrecked in St. Mary's Bay, Newfoundland, British North America.
Neptune	United Kingdom	The ship was driven ashore at Calais, France. She was on a voyage from Liverpool, Lancashire, to Ostend, East Flanders, Netherlands.
Sceptre	United Kingdom	The transport ship was wrecked in St. Mary's Bay.

=== 24 October ===
List of shipwrecks: 24 October 1814
Ship	State	Description
Horatio	United Kingdom	The ship was driven ashore and damaged at Liverpool, Lancashire. She was on a voyage from Liverpool to Trinidad. She was refloated.
Senhouse	United Kingdom	The ship was driven ashore and damaged at Liverpool. She was on a voyage from Prince Edward Island, British North America to Liverpool.

=== 25 October ===
List of shipwrecks: 25 October 1814
Ship	State	Description
Adventure	United Kingdom	The ship was severely damaged in the Humber in a gale.
Amphitrite	United Kingdom	The wreck of Amphitrite. The ship was driven ashore on Gotland, Sweden. She was on a voyage from Saint Petersburg, Russia to Glasgow, Renfrewshire. Amphitrite was later refloated. She arrived at Grangemouth, Stirlingshire, in early December.
Atlas	United Kingdom	The collier was driven ashore and wrecked at Hythe, Kent.
Die Hoffnung	Danzig	The ship was driven ashore crewless and wrecked at Aldeburgh, Suffolk, United Kingdom. She was on a voyage from Danzig to London, United Kingdom.
Elizabeth and Mary	United Kingdom	The sloop was driven ashore and wrecked at St Margaret's Bay, Kent. Her crew were rescued. She was on a voyage from London to Shoreham-by-Sea, Sussex
Fortuna	United Kingdom	The ship was driven ashore at Bridlington, Yorkshire. She was on a voyage from Sunderland, County Durham, to Rotterdam, South Holland, Netherlands.
Frederick	United Kingdom	The ship ran aground on the Holm Sand, in the North Sea and was wrecked. She was on a voyage from Stettin to London.
Friends	United Kingdom	The ship was driven ashore at Southwold, Suffolk.
George	United Kingdom	The ship ran aground at Great Yarmouth, Norfolk.
Jacob	Sweden	The ship foundered in the Baltic Sea while on a voyage from Libava, Courland Governorate to Gothenburg.
Kangaroo	United Kingdom	The ship ran aground in the River Thames at Cuckold's Point, Rotherhithe, Kent. She was on a voyage from Ostend, East Flanders, Netherlands to London.
Luna	United Kingdom	The collier was driven ashore and wrecked at Hythe.
Maria	United Kingdom	The ship was driven ashore and wrecked at Aldeburgh with some loss of life. She was on a voyage from Great Yarmouth, to London.
Maria	United Kingdom	The sloop was wrecked in the Humber.
Two Brothers	United Kingdom	The ship was driven ashore at Aldeburgh. Her crew were rescued. She was on a voyage from Boston, Lincolnshire, to Chatham, Kent.
Vrouw Jetze	Netherlands	The ship was driven ashore at Southwold. She was on a voyage from Groningen to London.

=== 27 October ===
List of shipwrecks: 27 October 1814
Ship	State	Description
Hoop	Netherlands	The ship was driven ashore at Winterton-on-Sea, Norfolk, United Kingdom. She was on a voyage from Sunderland, County Durham, United Kingdom to Schiedam, South Holland.
Peace	United Kingdom	The ship was run down and sunk in the Atlantic Ocean (39°03′N 12°30′W by HMS Grampus (Royal Navy). Her crew were rescued. She was on a voyage from Labrador, British North America to a Mediterranean port.

=== 29 October ===
List of shipwrecks: 29 October 1814
Ship	State	Description
Adventure	United Kingdom	The ship was driven ashore at Dragør, Denmark. She was on a voyage from Saint Petersburg, Russia to Portsmouth, Hampshire. Adventure was later refloated and taken in to Copenhagen, Denmark.
John	United Kingdom	The ship was wrecked near La Rochelle, Charente-Maritime, France with the loss of all but one of her crew. She was on a voyage from Newcastle upon Tyne, Northumberland to La Rochelle.
Venus	United Kingdom	The ship was driven ashore at Le Havre, Seine-Inférieure, France. She was on a voyage from Amelia Island, East Florida, New Spain to Plymouth, Devon.

=== 31 October ===
List of shipwrecks: 31 October 1814
Ship	State	Description
HMS Elizabeth	Royal Navy	War of 1812:The schooner capsized in the West Indies while pursuing an American privateer.

=== Unknown date ===
List of shipwrecks: Unknown date in October 1814
Ship	State	Description
Anna	United Kingdom	The ship foundered in the Baltic Sea. Her crew were rescued. She was on a voyage from Narva, Russia to Hull, Yorkshire.
Augusta	United Kingdom	The ship was wrecked at Narva, Russia.
Catharine	United Kingdom	The ship was wrecked on the coast of Jutland. Her crew were rescued. She was on a voyage from Liverpool, Lancashire, to Memel, Prussia.
Catharine	United Kingdom	The ship was driven ashore on Faial Island, Azores before 21 October. She was on a voyage from Sierra Leone to London.
Constantia	Sweden	The ship foundered in the Baltic Sea with the loss of all hands. She was on a voyage from Memel to Gothenburg.
Countess of Elgin	United Kingdom	The ship was abandoned in the North Sea while on a voyage from Charlestown, Fife, to Montrose, Forfarshire. Her three crew were rescued.
Eliza	United Kingdom	The ship was driven ashore and damaged at Deal, Kent. She was refloated on 26 October and taken in to Ramsgate, Kent.
Endeavour	United Kingdom	The ship was run down and sunk in the North Sea off Ostend, East Flanders, Netherlands. She was on a voyage from Ostend to London.
Falmouth	United Kingdom	The ship was lost in Dublin Bay. She was on a voyage from Bordeaux, Gironde, France to Dublin.
Fly	United Kingdom	War of 1812: The schooner was captured and sunk in the Atlantic Ocean off the coast of Portugal by an American privateer.
Forsigtigheten	Sweden	The ship was wrecked near Gothenburg. She was on a voyage from Karlshamn to Gothenburg.
Fountain	United Kingdom	The ship foundered in the Baltic Sea off "Fisher Island". Her crew were rescued. She was on a voyage from "Wyburgh" to King's Lynn, Norfolk.
George	United Kingdom	The ship was wrecked at "Warburgh" in late October. She was on a voyage from Saint Petersburg, Russia to Hull.
Hastings	United Kingdom	The ship was driven ashore and damaged at Deal. She was refloated on 26 October and taken in to Ramsgate in a waterlogged condition.
Hoffnung	Sweden	The ship was driven ashore and wrecked at Kolberg. She was on a voyage from Saint Petersburg, Russia to Stralsund.
Jane	United Kingdom	The ship foundered in the Baltic Sea. Her crew were rescued.
Jonge Johan	Netherlands	The ship sank at Scarborough, North Riding of Yorkshire United Kingdom.
Lord Gambier	United Kingdom	The ship was driven ashore and wrecked at Teignmouth, Devon. She was on a voyage from Jersey, Channel Islands, to Plymouth, Devon.
Magnet	United Kingdom	The ship foundered in the North Sea while on a voyage from Grangemouth, Stirlingshire, to Hamburg. Her crew were rescued by Venus (United Kingdom).
Margaret	United Kingdom	The ship foundered in the North Sea while on a voyage from Grangemouth to Hamburg.
Maria Josephina	Portugal	The ship was driven ashore on Læsø, Denmark. She was on a voyage from Lisbon to Saint Petersburg. She was refloated.
Nelly	United Kingdom	The ship was driven ashore near Bornholm, Denmark in late October. she was on a voyage from Danzig to Leith, Lothian.
Oscar	United Kingdom	The ship was destroyed by fire at Amelia Island, East Florida, New Spain.
Rapid	United Kingdom	War of 1812: The ship was captured in the Atlantic Ocean by the privateer Mammoth (United States) while on a voyage from Newfoundland, British North America to a Portuguese port.
Royal Edward	United Kingdom	The ship ran aground on the Isle of Jura. She was on a voyage from Miramichi, New Brunswick, British North America to Liverpool.
Salt Cat	United Kingdom	The ship was run down and sunk in the North Sea off the mouth of the Humber.
Sarah	United Kingdom	The ship sprang a leak and foundered in the Atlantic Ocean off Land's End, Cornwall with the loss of all but three of her crew. She was on a voyage from Bordeaux, Gironde, to Bristol, Gloucestershire.
Santa Rosa	United Kingdom	The ship was wrecked off Amelia Island.
St. Fernando	Spain	The ship was driven ashore on Gotland, Sweden. She was on a voyage from Saint Petersburg, Russia to Algeciras. She was refloated and put in to Ertholmen, Denmark for repairs.
Vrouw Rodsina	Netherlands	The ship was driven ashore and wrecked at Lowestoft, Suffolk, United Kingdom.
Vrow Margaretha	Netherlands	The ship departed from Sunderland, County Durham, United Kingdom for Amsterdam, North Holland. No further trace, presumed foundered with the loss of all hands.
USS Wasp	United States Navy	War of 1812: The sloop-of-war disappeared in the Atlantic Ocean with the loss of all hands sometime after parting company with the prize ship Atalanta (United States Navy) on 22 September 1814.
William	United Kingdom	The ship was driven ashore and wrecked in the River Thames at Cuckold's Point, Rotherhithe, Kent. She was on a voyage from London to Hamburg.
William	United Kingdom	The ship was wrecked on the Haisborough Sands, in the North Sea off the coast of Norfolk. She was on a voyage from London to Selby, Yorkshire.
William and John	United Kingdom	The ship was driven ashore and wrecked near Montrose, Forfarshire. Her crew were rescued.
10 unnamed vessels	United Kingdom	The transport ships were lost at Narva.

== November ==
=== 1 November ===
List of shipwrecks: 1 November 1814
Ship	State	Description
Two unnamed vessels	United Kingdom	The ships were wrecked near Calais, France.

=== 2 November ===
List of shipwrecks: 2 November 1814
Ship	State	Description
Camden Packet	United Kingdom	The ship was driven ashore near the Hook Tower, County Cork. She was on a voyage from Waterford to Milford, Pembrokeshire.
Hope	United Kingdom	The brig was wrecked in the Isles of Scilly. Her crew were rescued. She was on a voyage from Lisbon, Portugal to London.

=== 3 November ===
List of shipwrecks: 3 November 1814
Ship	State	Description
Unnamed	Flag unknown	The ship was driven ashore on Møn, Denmark. She was on a voyage from a Baltic port to London, United Kingdom.

=== 4 November ===
List of shipwrecks: 4 November 1814
Ship	State	Description
White Oak	United Kingdom	The ship was driven ashore 4 nautical miles (7.4 km) east of Calais, France. She was on a voyage from Kalmar, Sweden to Portsmouth, Hampshire. White Oak was later refloated and taken in to Gravelines, Nord, France.

=== 5 November ===
List of shipwrecks: 5 November 1814
Ship	State	Description
Peace	United Kingdom	The ship sprang a leak and foundered in the North Sea off the mouth of the Tees. Her crew survived. She was on a voyage from Sunderland, County Durham, to Whitby, Yorkshire.
Worksop	United Kingdom	The ship was driven ashore at North Somercotes, Lincolnshire. She was on a voyage from Newcastle upon Tyne, Northumberland to London.

=== 7 November ===
List of shipwrecks: 7 November 1814
Ship	State	Description
Ann	United Kingdom	The ship was driven ashore at Formby, Lancashire. She was on a voyage from Arkhangelsk, Russian Empire, to Liverpool, Lancashire.

=== 8 November ===
List of shipwrecks: 8 November 1814
Ship	State	Description
Ann	United Kingdom	The ship sprang a leak and foundered in the Atlantic Ocean off Padstow, Cornwall with the loss of six of her eight crew. She was on a voyage from Teignmouth, Devon to Liverpool, Lancashire.
Caledonia	United Kingdom	The ship was wrecked in Placentia Bay. Her crew were rescued.
xxxx	United Kingdom	The ship .
New Catharine	United Kingdom	The ship was driven ashore near Aberystwyth, Carmarthenshire. She was on a voyage from Cork to Liverpool, Lancashire. She was refloated and taken in to Aberystwyth.
Pitfour	United Kingdom	The ship foundered in the North Sea off the coast of Norfolk.
Thetis	United Kingdom	The ship was driven ashore and wrecked at Dunnet, Caithness. Her crew survived.

=== 9 November ===
List of shipwrecks: 9 November 1814
Ship	State	Description
Betsey	United Kingdom	The brig ran aground on a sandbank off the Rabbit Islands, Sutherland. Her crew survived. She was on a voyage from Trondheim, Norway to Belfast, County Antrim. Betsey was refloated on 15 December.
Ole Thorlelon Beoye	Norway	The ship was wrecked on the West Hoyle Sandbank, in Liverpool Bay. Her crew were rescued. She was on a voyage from a Norwegian port to Liverpool, Lancashire, United Kingdom.
Pauline	United Kingdom	The ship sank in Loch Eynort. She was on a voyage from Danzig to Liverpool.

=== 10 November ===
List of shipwrecks: 10 November 1814
Ship	State	Description
Industry	United Kingdom	The ship was run down and sunk in the English Channel off South Foreland, Kent. She was on a voyage from South Shields, County Durham, to Exeter, Devon.
Mary	United Kingdom	The ship was wrecked on the Fahlenburg Reef. She was on a voyage from Stockholm, Sweden to Dublin.
Orange Boven	United Kingdom	The ship was destroyed by fire in the English Channel off Dungeness, Kent. Her crew were rescued. She was on a voyage from London to Lisbon, Portugal.
Nicholas Adolph	Flag unknown	The ship was wrecked at Amelia Island, East Florida.
San Francisco Gabriel	Spain	The ship was driven ashore and wrecked at Boulogne, Pas-de-Calais, France with the loss of seven of her crew. She was on a voyage from Bilbao to London, United Kingdom.
Selina	United Kingdom	The ship was run down and sunk off North Foreland, Kent. Her crew were rescued. She was on a voyage from Sunderland, County Durham, to Portsmouth, Hampshire.
Unnamed	United Kingdom	The sloop foundered in the North Sea off Blakeney, Norfolk with the loss of all hands.

=== 11 November ===
List of shipwrecks: 11 November 1814
Ship	State	Description
Leo	Sweden	The ship was wrecked near Calais, France. She was on a voyage from St Martin's to Strömstad.
Moskwa	Russia	The ship was wrecked at Arkhangelsk. She was on a voyage from Arkhangelsk to Hamburg.
St. Pieter	Hamburg	The ship foundered in the English Channel off Boulogne, Pas-de-Calais, France. She was on a voyage from Málaga, Spain to Hamburg.
Swiftsure	United Kingdom	The ship was driven ashore and wrecked at Hoylake, Lancashire. She was on a voyage from Drogheda, County Louth, to Liverpool, Lancashire.

=== 12 November ===
List of shipwrecks: 12 November 1814
Ship	State	Description
Caroline	United Kingdom	The ship was driven ashore on Dragør, Denmark. She was on a voyage from Stockholm, Sweden to Sligo.
Diana	United Kingdom	The ship was holed by an anchor and sank at Lisbon, Portugal.
Johanna	Denmark	The ship ran aground on the Goodwin Sands, Kent, United Kingdom, She was on a voyage from Saint Barthélemy to Copenhagen. She was refloated and taken in to Ramsgate, Kent.
Louisa	United Kingdom	The ship was wrecked on Düne, Heligoland. Her crew were rescued. She was on a voyage from London to Hamburg.
Maria Théresa	France	The ship was driven ashore at Seaford, Sussex, United Kingdom. Her crew were rescued. She was on a voyage from Isigny-sur-Mer, Calvados to Shoreham-by-Sea, Sussex, United Kingdom.
Minerva	United Kingdom	The ship was driven ashore and wrecked at Boulogne, Pas-de-Calais, France. She was on a voyage from Falmouth, Cornwall, to a Norwegian port.

=== 13 November ===
List of shipwrecks: 13 November 1814
Ship	State	Description
Hope	United Kingdom	The ship was wrecked at "Scheveling" with the loss of five of her crew. She was on a voyage from London to Rotterdam, South Holland, Netherlands.
Two Brothers	United Kingdom	The ship was driven ashore and wrecked at Monster, South Holland.

=== 14 November ===
List of shipwrecks: 14 November 1814
Ship	State	Description
Pomona	United Kingdom	The ship departed Alderney, Channel Islands for Guernsey, Channel Islands. No further trace, presumed foundered in the English Channel with the loss of all hands.
Twee Gebroeders	Netherlands	The ship was driven ashore and wrecked at 's-Gravenzande, South Holland. She was on a voyage from London, United Kingdom to Amsterdam, North Holland.
Tyne and Trent	United Kingdom	The packet ship sank in the Elbe with the loss of all but two of her crew and a pilot. She was on a voyage from London to Hamburg.

=== 15 November ===
List of shipwrecks: 15 November 1814
Ship	State	Description
Carolina	Portugal	The ship foundered off Tortola. Her crew were rescued. She was on a voyage from Madeira to Jamaica.
Five Sisters	United Kingdom	The ship was lost neat St. John's, Newfoundland, British North America. She was on a voyage from Halifax, Nova Scotia, British North America to St. John's.
Juffrow Anna & Clara	Hamburg	The ship was run down and sunk off Heligoland. She was on a voyage from London, United Kingdom to Hamburg.

=== 16 November ===
List of shipwrecks: 16 November 1814
Ship	State	Description
Emanuel	United Kingdom	The ship was abandoned off Heligoland. She was on a voyage from Leith, Lothian to Hamburg. She was taken possession of by the harbour master at Heligoland.
Friends Goodwill	United Kingdom	The sloop departed from Sunderland, County Durham, for Scarborough, Yorkshire. No further trace, presumed foundered in the North Sea with the loss of all hands.
Goede Hoffnung	Kingdom of Hanover	The ship was driven ashore and wrecked on Düne, Heligoland. She was on a voyage from Newcastle upon Tyne, Northumberland, United Kingdom to Leer.
Maxwell	United Kingdom	The ship was lost off Borkum, Kingdom of Hanover. She was on a voyage from Liverpool to Bremen.

=== 17 November ===
List of shipwrecks: 17 November 1814
Ship	State	Description
Conjunturen	Flag unknown	The ship was wrecked on Dragør, Denmark. She was on a voyage from a Baltic port to London, United Kingdom.
Eliza	United Kingdom	The ship departed from Senegal for London. No further trace, presumed foundered with the loss of all hands.
George	United Kingdom	The ship was driven ashore and wrecked at Memel, Prussia. Her crew were rescued. She was on a voyage from Danzig to London.
George and Ann	United Kingdom	The ship was driven ashore and wrecked at Varberg, Sweden. Her crew survived. She was on a voyage from Saint Petersburg, Russian Empire, to Liverpool, Lancashire.
Hero	United Kingdom	The ship was driven ashore and wrecked at Varberg. Her crew were rescued.
Hibernia	United Kingdom	The ship was wrecked on the Morant Keys. She was on a voyage from Halifax, Nova Scotia, British North America to Jamaica.
John	United Kingdom	The ship was driven ashore at the mouth of the River Ythan. She was on a voyage from Sunderland, County Durham to Newburgh, Fife.
Mercurias	Bremen	The ship was driven ashore and wrecked on Düne, Heligoland. She was on a voyage from Bordeaux, Gironde, France to Bremen.
Nancy	United Kingdom	War of 1812: The ship was captured and sunk in the English Channel by the privateer Lawrence (United States). She was on a voyage from Guernsey, Channel Islands, to Jamaica.
HMRC Princess Royal	Board of Customs	The 10-gun cutter was driven ashore and wrecked at Aberdeen. All 30 crew were rescued.
San Felipe	Spain	The ship was driven ashore at Toward Point, Argyllshire, United Kingdom. She was on a voyage from Amelia Island, East Florida, New Spain to the Clyde. She was later refloated and completed her voyage.
Stadt Rendsburg	Hamburg	The ship was driven ashore and wrecked on Düne, Heligoland. She was on a voyage from London to Hamburg. Stadt Rendsburg was refloated on 26 March 1815 and taken in to Glückstadt.

=== 18 November ===
List of shipwrecks: 18 November 1814
Ship	State	Description
Louisa	United Kingdom	War of 1812: The ship was captured by the privateer Macedonian (United States) while on a voyage from Saint John, New Brunswick, British North America to Barbados. She was set afire and sunk.
Rosario	Spain	The ship was wrecked in the Shetland Islands, United Kingdom with the loss of fourteen of her 22 crew and her passengers. She was on a voyage from Saint Petersburg, Russia to Málaga.
Vier Bruders	Stettin	The ship was lost near Halmstad, Sweden. She was on a voyage from London, United Kingdom to Stettin.

=== 19 November ===
List of shipwrecks: 19 November 1814
Ship	State	Description
Goodintent	United Kingdom	War of 1812: The ship was captured and burnt off the Isles of Scilly by the privateer Lawrence (United States). She was on a voyage from Newport, Monmouthshire, to Teignmouth, Devon.
Louisa	United Kingdom	War of 1812: The ship was captured and destroyed by an American privateer. She was on a voyage from Bermuda to Halifax, Nova Scotia, British North America.

=== 20 November ===
List of shipwrecks: 20 November 1814
Ship	State	Description
Anna Matilda	United Kingdom	War of 1812: The ship was captured in the Atlantic Ocean off São Miguel, Azores, Portugal by the privateer Hero (United States). She was set afire and sunk. Ann Matilda was on a voyage from Figueira, Portugal to São Miguel.
Britannia	United Kingdom	War of 1812: The ship was captured by the privateer Macedonian (United States) while on a voyage from Saint John', Newfoundland, British North America to Liverpool, Lancashire. She was set afire and sunk.
Hazard	United Kingdom	War of 1812: The ship was captured in the Atlantic Ocean by the privateer Lawrence (United States). She was set afire and sunk. Hazard was on a voyage from Halifax, Nova Scotia, British North America to Annapolis, Maryland, United States.

=== 21 November ===
List of shipwrecks: 21 November 1814
Ship	State	Description
Maria Theresa	Spain	The ship was run down and sunk in the English Channel by Mint (United Kingdom). Her crew were rescued. She was on a voyage from Bilbao to London, United Kingdom.

=== 22 November ===
List of shipwrecks: 22 November 1814
Ship	State	Description
Ontario	United Kingdom	The ship was wrecked near Pladda, Inner Hebrides. She was on a voyage from Quebec, British North America to Greenock, Renfrewshire.
Thetis	United Kingdom	The ship was wrecked on the North Bull, in the Irish Sea with the loss of seven of her crew. She was on a voyage from Liverpool, Lancashire, to Newry, County Antrim.
Thorn	United Kingdom	The ship was driven ashore at Waterford. She was on a voyage from London to Chester, Cheshire.

=== 23 November ===
List of shipwrecks: 23 November 1814
Ship	State	Description
Alexander	United Kingdom	The ship departed Halifax, Nova Scotia, British North America for Liverpool, Lancashire. No further trace, presumed foundered in the Atlantic Ocean with the loss of all hands.

=== 24 November ===
List of shipwrecks: 24 November 1814
Ship	State	Description
HMS Fantome	Royal Navy	The brig-sloop ran aground and was wrecked near the Sambro Island Lighthouse, Nova Scotia, British North America. Her crew survived.
Friendship	United Kingdom	The schooner ran aground and was wrecked near the Sambro Island Lighthouse.
Industry	United Kingdom	The schooner was driven ashore and wrecked near the Sambro Island Lighthouse. She was on a voyage from Castine, Maine, United States to Halifax, Nova Scotia, British North America.
Perseverance	United Kingdom	The schooner ran aground and was wrecked near the Sambro Island Lighthouse. She was on a voyage from Castine to Halifax.

=== 25 November ===
List of shipwrecks: 25 November 1814
Ship	State	Description
Hazard	Norway	The ship was driven ashore at Dover, Kent, United Kingdom. She was on a voyage from Kristiansan to Boulogne, Pas-de-Calais, France. She was refloated and taken in to Dover.
Hit or Miss	United Kingdom	The ship was destroyed by fire at Antwerp, Netherlands.
Sir Edward Pellew	United Kingdom	War of 1812: The ship was captured by the privateer Macedonian (United States) while on a voyage from Greenock, Renfrewshire, to St. Andrews, Nova Scotia, British North America. She was set afire and sunk.
Woodman	United Kingdom	The ship ran aground and was wrecked on the Warden Ledge, in the English Channel off the Isle of Wight. She was on a voyage from London to Dublin.

=== 26 November ===
List of shipwrecks: 26 November 1814
Ship	State	Description
Commerce	United Kingdom	The sloop was driven ashore and wrecked at Mawgan Porth, Cornwall. All on board were rescued, but one person was drowned attempting to save her cargo. She was on a voyage from Waterford to London.
Fame	United Kingdom	The ship was driven ashore near Padstow, Cornwall. She was on a voyage from Youghal, County Cork to Southampton, Hampshire.
Franziska Ludovica	Flag unknown	The ship was wrecked on Puffin Island, Anglesey, United Kingdom with the loss of three of her crew. She was on a voyage from Bordeaux, Gironde, France to Liverpool, Lancashire.
La Commune de Bourdeaux	France	The ship ran aground on the Goodwin Sands, Kent, United Kingdom while on a voyage from "Audrienne" to Ostend, East Flanders, Netherlands. Her crew were rescued. She was later found at sea and taken in to Ramsgate, Kent in a waterlogged condition.
Little John	United Kingdom	The ship was driven ashore at Hoylake, Lancashire. Shew as on a voyage from Liverpool, Lancashire, to Rio de Janeiro. Little John was later refloated and taken in to Liverpool.
Veynol	United Kingdom	The ship was lost at Le Havre, Seine-Inférieure with the loss of her captain. She was on a voyage from London to Le Havre.

=== 27 November ===
List of shipwrecks: 27 November 1814
Ship	State	Description
Hutchinson	United Kingdom	The ship foundered in the Atlantic Ocean with the loss of all hands. She was on a voyage from Cork to Lisbon, Portugal.

=== 28 November ===
List of shipwrecks: 28 November 1814
Ship	State	Description
Lady Shore	United Kingdom	The transport ship was driven ashore at Margate, Kent. She was refloated and taken in to Westgate Bay.
Ocean	United Kingdom	War of 1812: The ship was captured by an American privateer in the Atlantic Ocean. She was set afire and sunk.

=== 29 November ===
List of shipwrecks: 29 November 1814
Ship	State	Description
Active	United Kingdom	The ship was wrecked on the Haisborough Sands, in the North Sea off the coast of Norfolk. Her crew survived. She was on a voyage from Newcastle upon Tyne, Northumberland to Southwold, Suffolk.

=== Unknown date ===
List of shipwrecks: Unknown date in November 1814
Ship	State	Description
Abraham	United Kingdom	The ship ran aground at St. Thomas, Virgin Islands. She was on a voyage from Lancaster, Lancashire to St. Thomas. She was refloated on 5 December and taken in to St. Thomas.
Active	United Kingdom	The ship was wrecked on Læsø, Denmark.
Adventure	United Kingdom	The ship was driven ashore and severely damaged at Arkhangelsk, Russia.
Auguste Felicité	France	The ship foundered in the Atlantic Ocean off Porto, Portugal. All on board were rescued by a Russian vessel. She was on a voyage from Le Havre, Seine-Inférieure to Porto.
Betsey	United Kingdom	The sloop was wrecked in the Copeland Islands, County Down with the loss of all three crew. She was on a voyage from Greenock, Renfrewshire to Newry, County Down.
Charles	United Kingdom	The ship was wrecked near Holyhead, Anglesey. She was on a voyage from Drogheda, County Louth, to Liverpool, Lancashire.
Chatham	United Kingdom	The ship was driven ashore in the Gulf of Florida in early November. She was on a voyage from Jamaica to Liverpool.
Commodore Decateur	United States	The schooner was discovered at sea dismasted and abandoned by HMS Fairy (Royal Navy). She was taken in to Barbados on 11 November.
Diver	United Kingdom	The ship sank near Penmaenmawr, Carnarvonshire. She was on a voyage from Waterford to Liverpool.
Endeavour	United Kingdom	The ship was lost near Caernarfon. She was on a voyage from Wicklow to Liverpool.
Enterprize	United Kingdom	The ship was wrecked on the Goodwin Sands, Kent. she was on a voyage from Newcastle upon Tyne, Northumberland to Lymington, Hampshire.
Equator	Portugal	The ship was driven ashore on Texel, North Holland, Netherlands. She was on a voyage from Porto to Amsterdam, North Holland. Equator was later refloated and taken in to Amesterdam.
Fortuna	Spain	The ship was wrecked in the Shetland Islands early in November. She was on a voyage from Saint Petersburg, Russia to Cádiz.
Fountain	United Kingdom	The ship was driven ashore on Hogland. She was later refloated and taken in to Lovisa (Loviisa) in the Grand Duchy of Finland, Russia.
Hamburg Borse	Hamburg	The ship was wrecked on the Scharhorn Sand. Her crew survived. She was on a voyage from London to Hamburg.
Hanseatica Boud	Bremen	The ship was wrecked on the Tergerlis Plat, at the mouth of the Weser. She was on a voyage from Bordeaux, Gironde, France to Bremen.
Hebe	United Kingdom	The ship sprang a leak and was abandoned off St. Agnes, Cornwall. She was on a voyage from waterford to London. Hebe was later boarded by some pilots and beached near Padstow, Cornwall.
Hope	United Kingdom	The ship was driven ashore near Stade, Kingdom of Hanover. She was on a voyage from Sunderland, County Durham, to Hamburg.
Huddersfield	United Kingdom	The ship ran aground on the Haisborough Sands, in the North Sea off the coast of Norfolk. She was on a voyage from Hull, Yorkshire to London. Huddersfield was refloated on 7 November and taken in to Harwich, Essex.
James	United Kingdom	The ship was wrecked near Sylt, Duchy of Schleswig. Her crew were rescued. She was on a voyage from London to Hamburg.
Margaretta	Flag unknown	The ship was driven ashore. She was refloated and put in to Whitby, Yorkshire on 3 November.
Moreau	United States	The ship was wrecked at Nassau, Bahamas. She was on a voyage from Amelia Island, East Florida, to New Providence, New Jersey.
Neptune	United Kingdom	The ship was driven ashore on the coast of Cuba. She was on a voyage from Jamaica to London Neptune was refloated in February and taken in to Havana, Cuba.
Oak	United Kingdom	The ship was wrecked on the Vogel Sand, in the North Sea. Her crew were rescued. She was on a voyage from Leith, Lothian, to Hamburg.
Providence	United Kingdom	The ship was wrecked near Holyhead, Anglesey. Her crew were rescued. She was on a voyage from Waterford to Liverpool, Lancashire.
Robert & Mary	United Kingdom	The ship was wrecked at Boulogne, Pas-de-Calais, France. She was on a voyage from London to Saint-Valery-sur-Somme, France.
Roper	United Kingdom	War of 1812: The ship was captured by the privateer Pulaski (United States) while on a voyage from Malta to London. She was sent in to Charleston, South Carolina, where she was wrecked early in November.
Roselle	United Kingdom	War of 1812: The ship, a prize of the privateer Kemp (United States), was wrecked at Charleston, South Carolina, United States.
St. Pedro	Portugal	The ship was lost at Porto in late November. She was on a voyage from Maranhão, Brazil to Porto.
St Petersburg	Russia	The ship was driven ashore and severely damaged at Arkhangelsk.
Swallow	United Kingdom	The ship was driven ashore on Gotland, Sweden. She was on a voyage from Saint Petersburg to London. Swallow was later refloated and put into Bornholm, Denmark.
Two Friends	United Kingdom	The ship was wrecked on the Little Russel. She was on a voyage from Portland, Dorset, to Jersey, Channel Islands.
Two Sisters	United Kingdom	The ship was run down and sunk in the Firth of Forth. She was on a voyage from Dundee, Forfarshire, to Liverpool.
Unnamed	(France) Guadeloupe	The ship was abandoned at sea before 17 November. She was on a voyage from Guadeloupe to Halifax, Nova Scotia, British North America.

== December ==
=== 1 December ===
List of shipwrecks: 1 December 1814
Ship	State	Description
Dart	United Kingdom	War of 1812: The ship was captured in the Atlantic Ocean by the privateer Lawrence (United States) while on a voyage from Cádiz, Spain to Exeter, Devon. She was set afire and sunk.
Ranger	United Kingdom	The ship was lost while on a voyage from Galway to Liverpool, Lancashire.
Swift	(United Kingdom of Great Britain and Ireland) Barbados	The schooner capsized and sank on the Mahacca Bar with the loss of four lives. She was on a voyage from Demerara to Barbados.

=== 2 December ===
List of shipwrecks: 2 December 1814
Ship	State	Description
Active	United Kingdom	The ship departed from Newfoundland, British North America for Jersey, Channel Islands. No further trace, presumed foundered in the Atlantic Ocean with the loss of all hands.
Prevoyante	United Kingdom	The ship departed Newfoundland for San Sebastián, Spain. No further trace, presumed foundered in the Atlantic Ocean with the loss of all hands.
Race Horse	United Kingdom	The ship departed Newfoundland for a Portuguese port. No further trace, presumed foundered in the Atlantic Ocean with the loss of all hands.

=== 3 December ===
List of shipwrecks: 3 December 1814
Ship	State	Description
Commerce	United Kingdom	The sloop was driven ashore and wrecked at Mawgan Porth, Cornwall. All on board were rescued.
Janet and Peggy	United Kingdom	The ship foundered in the Irish Sea off Carlingford, County Louth.
Phœnix	United Kingdom	The ship foundered in the Irish Sea off Carlingford. She was on a voyage from Liverpool, Lancashire, to Newry, County Antrim.
Unity	United Kingdom	The ship was abandoned by her crew in the English Channel off Berry Head, Devon. Presumed subsequently foundered. She was on a voyage from London to Bristol, Gloucestershire.

=== 4 December ===
List of shipwrecks: 4 December 1814
Ship	State	Description
Alexander	Russia	The ship was driven ashore near Hull, Yorkshire, United Kingdom. She was on a voyage from Arkhangelsk to Lisbon, Portugal.
Henry Dundas	United Kingdom	The ship departed from Portsmouth, Hampshire, for São Miguel Island, Azores. No further trace, presumed foundered with the loss of all hands.
Hero	United Kingdom	The cutter sprang a leak and foundered in the English Channel off Start Point, Devon. Her crew were rescued. She was on a voyage from Dartmouth, Devon, to Lisbon, Portugal.
Union	France	The galiot was driven ashore and wrecked at Rye, Sussex, United Kingdom with the loss of seven of her eight crew. She was on a voyage from Le Havre, Seine-Inférieure to London, United Kingdom.
Venus	United Kingdom	The ship foundered in Alemouth Bay. Her crew were rescued.

=== 5 December ===
List of shipwrecks: 5 December 1814
Ship	State	Description
Charlotte	United Kingdom	The ship was wrecked near Danzig. She was on a voyage from Pillau, Prussia to London.
Christian	United Kingdom	War of 1812: The ship was captured by the privateer Lawrence (United States) in the Atlantic Ocean 9 leagues (27 nautical miles (50 km)) west of the Isles of Scilly. She was set afire and sunk. Christian was on a voyage from Faro, Portugal, to London.
Constantine	(United Kingdom of Great Britain and Ireland) Jersey	The ship was driven ashore and wrecked at Étaples, Pas-de-Calais, France. Her crew were rescued. She was on a voyage from Jersey to Amsterdam, North Holland, Netherlands.
London	United Kingdom	The ship was driven ashore at Youghal, County Cork. She was on a voyage from Sligo to Greenock, Renfrewshire. London was later refloated.
Mary Ann	United Kingdom	The ship was abandoned in the Irish Sea off Abergele, Denbighshire. She was on a voyage from Liverpool to Waterford.

=== 6 December ===
List of shipwrecks: 6 December 1814
Ship	State	Description
Perseverance	United Kingdom	The ship struck the Newcombe Sand, in the North Sea off Great Yarmouth, Norfolk and consequently foundered. She was on a voyage from Rouen, Seine-Inférieure to Hull, Yorkshire.
Themis	Hamburg	The ship was wrecked on the French coast. She was on a voyage from Hamburg to Saint Thomas, Virgin Islands.

=== 7 December ===
List of shipwrecks: 7 December 1814
Ship	State	Description
Perseverance	United Kingdom	The brig was wrecked on the Barnard Sand, in the North Sea off Great Yarmouth, Norfolk. Her crew were rescued by John (United Kingdom). She was on a voyage from Rouen, Seine-Inférieure, France to Hull, Yorkshire.
Roselle	United Kingdom	War of 1812: The ship, which had been captured by the privateer Kemp (United States) on 2 December, was wrecked at Charleston, South Carolina.
Unnamed	United Kingdom	The ship ran aground on the Warden Ledge, off the Isle of Wight.

=== 8 December ===
List of shipwrecks: 8 December 1814
Ship	State	Description
Good Hope	Hamburg	The ship sank at Fécamp, Seine-Inférieure. France. She was on a voyage from Hamburg to Rouen, Seine-Inférieure.
Robert	United Kingdom	War of 1812: The ship was captured by the privateer Grand Turk (United States) while on a voyage from Prince Edward Island, British North America to London. She was set afire and sunk.
Richard	United Kingdom	The ship ran aground at Danzig. Her crew were rescued. She was on a voyage from Danzig to London.

=== 9 December ===
List of shipwrecks: 9 December 1814
Ship	State	Description
Alexander	Russia	The ship was driven ashore in the Humber. She was on a voyage from Arkhangelsk to Lisbon, Portugal.
Amphitrite	United Kingdom	The ship sprang a leak in the Atlantic Ocean. Her nineteen passengers and crew took to the long boat and were rescued four days later by Quebec Packet (United Kingdom). Amphitrite was on a voyage from Quebec City, Lower Canada, British North America to London. She was later discovered at sea by a Revenue cutter and was taken in to Broadhaven Bay.
Apollo	United Kingdom	The collier was driven ashore at Sunderland, County Durham.
Jacob	Hamburg	The ship was wrecked on Texel, North Holland, Netherlands with the loss of all hands. She was on a voyage from London to Hamburg.
Mercury	United Kingdom	The ship was wrecked at Cape Breton Island, Nova Scotia, British North America with the loss of her captain. She was on a voyage from Quebec City, Lower Canada, British North America to the Clyde.
Psyche	Flag unknown	The ship was lost at Baltic Port, Russia. She was on a voyage from Reval, Russia to Stettin.
Venus	Hamburg	The ship was driven ashore between Glückstadt and Stade. She was on a voyage from Liverpool, Lancashire, United Kingdom to Hamburg. Venus was later refloated.
Volante	United Kingdom	The collier was driven ashore at Sunderland. She was refloated on 12 December.

=== 10 December ===
List of shipwrecks: 10 December 1814
Ship	State	Description
Auspicious	United Kingdom	The ship was driven ashore in Dundrum Bay. She was on a voyage from Liverpool, Lancashire, to Newry, County Antrim.
George	United Kingdom	War of 1812: The ship was captured by the privateer Leo (United States) while on a voyage from Saint John, New Brunswick, British North America to London. She was set afire and sunk.
Hope	United Kingdom	The ship was wrecked on the Goodwin Sands, Kent. Her crew were rescued. She was on a voyage from Fowey, Cornwall, to London.
Jane	United Kingdom	The ship foundered. She was on a voyage from Sunderland, County Durham, to Hastings, Sussex.
Providence	United Kingdom	The ship ran aground on the Newcombe Sand, in the North Sea off Great Yarmouth, Norfolk and was abandoned by her crew. She subsequently refloated at was driven ashore and wrecked at Kirkley, Suffolk. Providence was on a voyage from Sunderland, County Durham, to Rotterdam, south Holland, Netherlands.
Speedy	United Kingdom	The ship was driven ashore and wrecked at Saltfleet, Lincolnshire.
Steady	United Kingdom	The sloop ran aground on the Rose Sand, in the North Sea off Saltfleet and was wrecked. Her crew survived.
Traveller	United Kingdom	The ship was wrecked at Thisted, Denmark. She was on a voyage from Riga, Russia to London.
Twee Gesusters	Prussia	The ship was driven ashore near Calais, France. She was on a voyage from Memel to Le Havre, Seine-Inférieure, France.

=== 11 December ===
List of shipwrecks: 11 December 1814
Ship	State	Description
Auspicious	United Kingdom	The ship was driven ashore in Dundrum Bay. She was on a voyage from Liverpool, Lancashire, to Newry, County Antrim.
Elizabeth	United Kingdom	The ship was wrecked on the Vogel Sand, in the North Sea with the loss of her captain. She was on a voyage from Glasgow, Renfrewshire, to Hamburg.
Eston	United Kingdom	The ship was driven ashore and severely damaged at Milford, Pembrokeshire. She was on a voyage from Cork to Milford. Eston was later refloated.
Industry	United Kingdom	The ship was driven ashore near Pakefield, Suffolk. She was on a voyage from Aldeburgh, Suffolk to Hull, Yorkshire.
Maria and Francesca	Hamburg	The ship was wrecked on the Cork Sand, in the North Sea off Harwich, Essex, United Kingdom. She was on a voyage from Hamburg to Puerto Rico.
HDMS Pearl	Royal Danish Navy	The frigate was wrecked on a reef off Skagen. She was on a voyage from Helsingør to Saint Croix, Danish West Indies.
Sir George Collier	United Kingdom	The ship foundered off Cape Sable Island, Nova Scotia, British North America. She was on a voyage from Halifax, Nova Scotia to Castine, Maine, United States.

=== 12 December ===
List of shipwrecks: 12 December 1814
Ship	State	Description
Atalanta	Bremen	The galiot was driven ashore and wrecked at Porthleven, Cornwall, United Kingdom with the loss of five of her crew and three rescuers. She was on a voyage from St. Ubes, Spain to Altona, Hamburg.
Betsey	United Kingdom	The ship was driven ashore and wrecked at Filey, Yorkshire with the loss of two of her crew.
Britannia	United Kingdom	The ship was driven ashore and wrecked at Dungeness, Kent. She was on a voyage from London to Lisbon, Portugal.
Canlive	United Kingdom	The ship was driven ashore and wrecked at Dragør, Denmark.
Caroline	United Kingdom	The ship was driven ashore on Dragør, Denmark and was wrecked.
Dove	United Kingdom	The ship was wrecked near the Hook Lighthouse, County Cork. She was on a voyage from Cork to London.
La Jeane Adelle	France	The brig was wrecked on the Mew Stone, off Plymouth, Devon, United Kingdom with the loss of four of her seven crew. She was on a voyage from Porto, Portugal to Le Havre, Seine-Inférieure.
O. P.	United Kingdom	The schooner was driven ashore and wrecked at Plymouth. She was on a voyage from Bordeaux, Gironde, France to Plymouth.
Vriendschap	Netherlands	The ship was driven ashore at Zandvoort, North Holland. She was on a voyage from London to Amsterdam, North Holland.

=== 13 December ===
List of shipwrecks: 13 December 1814
Ship	State	Description
Goodintent	United Kingdom	The ship was driven ashore near Hurst Castle, Hampshire. Her crew were rescued. She was on a voyage from Plymouth, Devon, to Portland, Dorset.
Jeane Adelle	France	The ship was lost off the Mewstone with the loss of all but three of her crew. She was on a voyage from Porto, Portugal to Le Havre, Seine-Inférieure.
Nelson	United Kingdom	The ship was driven ashore near Duncannon, County Wexford. She was on a voyage from Liverpool, Lancashire, to Bordeaux, Gironde, France.
Providence	United Kingdom	The brig was driven ashore and severely damaged at Plymouth, Devon. She was on a voyage from Hamburg to Cádiz, Spain. She was refloated on 25 December.
St. Antonio	Portugal	The schooner was driven ashore at Dublin, United Kingdom. She was on a voyage from St. Ube's, Spain to Dublin.
St. Michael's	United Kingdom	The ship was driven ashore and wrecked at Plymouth with the loss of all but three of her crew.
Unnamed	United Kingdom	The ship was driven ashore at Hela, Prussia.
Unnamed	Danzig	The ship was driven asore at Hela. She was on a voyage from Dantzig to London.

=== 14 December ===
List of shipwrecks: 14 December 1814
Ship	State	Description
Eston	United Kingdom	The ship was driven ashore at Milford Haven Pembrokeshire. She was later refloated but found to be severely damaged.
Johannes	Netherlands	The ship sank in the Vliet, between Den Helder and Texel, North Holland. Her crew were rescued. She was on a voyage from Amsterdam, North Holland to Barcelona, Spain.
Malta	United Kingdom	The brig foundered in the North Sea off Aberdeen with the loss of all five crew. She was on a voyage from Sunderland, County Durham to Aberdeen.
HMS Olympia	Royal Navy	The Adonis-class schooner was driven ashore at Spithead, Hampshire.
O. P.	United Kingdom	The ship sprang a leak and was beached at Plymouth, Devon, but sank.
Robert	United Kingdom	The sloop was driven ashore and wrecked at Glenstocking, Dumfriesshire. Her crew were rescued.

=== 15 December ===
List of shipwrecks: 15 December 1814
Ship	State	Description
Commerce	United Kingdom	War of 1812: The ship was captured by the privateer Grand Turk (United States) while on a voyage from Newfoundland, British North America to Barbados. She was set afire and sunk.
Dois Irmaos	Portugal	The ship was driven ashore and wrecked on Texel, North Holland, Netherlands.
Friends	United Kingdom	The ship was driven ashore at Rye, Sussex. She was on a voyage from Rouen, Seine-Inférieure, France to Newhaven, Sussex.
Nancy	United Kingdom	The ship was driven ashore near Campbeltown, Argyllshire. She was on a voyage from Sligo to Glasgow, Renfrewshire.
Nelly and Betty	(United Kingdom of Great Britain and Ireland) Isle of Man	The sloop was driven ashore at Redness Point, near Whitehaven, Cumberland. Her crew were rescued.
Sophia	Sweden	The galiot was driven ashore in Whitesand Bay. She was on a voyage from Liverpool, Lancashire, United Kingdom to Hamburg.
Sutterton	United Kingdom	The ketch was wrecked on the Gore Sands, off Bridgwater, Somerset with the loss of all eight people on board. She was on a voyage from Bridgwater to Chepstow, Monmouthshire.

=== 16 December ===
List of shipwrecks: 16 December 1814
Ship	State	Description
Aid	United Kingdom	The ship was driven ashore at Dumfries. She was on a voyage from an American port to Dumfries.
Ann	United Kingdom	The ship sank at Ramsgate, Kent.
Apollo	United Kingdom	The ship sank at Cobh, County Cork. She was on a voyage from London to New Providence, Bahamas. Apollo was declared a total loss.
Argus	United Kingdom	The ship was driven ashore at Formby, Lancashire.
Bee	United Kingdom	The ship was driven ashore at Port Glasgow, Renfrewshire.
Betty	United Kingdom	The sloop sank at Port Glasgow.
Brunton	United Kingdom	The ship was driven ashore at Whitby, Yorkshire. She was on a voyage from Whitby to London.
Carolina	Flag unknown	The ship was driven ashore on Texel, North Holland, Netherlands. She was bound for Genoa.
Caroline	United Kingdom	The ship was driven ashore at Limerick. She was on a voyage from Limerick to London. She was later refloated.
Charles	United Kingdom	The ship foundered in the Irish Sea off Holyhead, Anglesey with the loss of all hands.
Charles Jones	United Kingdom	The ship foundered in the Irish Sea off Holyhead with the loss of all hands.
Comet	United Kingdom	The ship was driven ashore at Cobh.
Drie Vrunden	Netherlands	The galiot was driven ashore at Ramsgate. She was refloated and taken in to Broadstairs, Kent. Drie Vrunden was on a voyage from London to São Miguel, Azores, Portugal.
Eliza	United Kingdom	The ship capsized at Troon, Ayrshire, with the loss of twelve of the 26 people on board. She was on a voyage from Londonderry to Troon.
Elizabeth	United Kingdom	The ship was driven ashore at Liverpool, Lancashire.
Elizabeth	United Kingdom	The ship was driven ashore at Limerick. She was later refloated.
Elizabeth	United Kingdom	The ship was driven ashore at Greenock, Renfrewshire. She was on a voyage from Greenock to Jamaica.
Fame	United Kingdom	The ship sank at Cobh.
Flora	United Kingdom	The ship foundered in the North Sea off the Holderness coast, Yorkshire. Her crew were rescued by Flora (United Kingdom).
Flower	United Kingdom	The ship was run down and sunk by Hercules (United Kingdom). She was on a voyage from Glasgow to Campbeltown, Argyllshire.
Friends	United Kingdom	The ship was driven ashore at Lytham St. Annes, Lancashire. She was on a voyage from Pärnu, Russia to Liverpool.
Grace	United Kingdom	The ship was driven ashore at Dunure, Ayrshire.
Harriet	United Kingdom	The ship was driven ashore at Cobh. She was on a voyage from Liverpool to Maranhão, Brazil. She was later refloated.
Harvie	United Kingdom	The ship was driven ashore at Port Glasgow, Renfrewshire.
Hector	United Kingdom	The ship was driven ashore at Milford Haven and severely damaged. Her crew were rescued.
Hope	United Kingdom	The ship was driven ashore and wrecked in Loch Indaal.
Isaac	Netherlands	The galiot was driven ashore at Sutton, Dublin, United Kingdom with the loss of two of her crew. She was on a voyage from Liverpool to Amsterdam, North Holland.
Jane	United Kingdom	The ship was driven ashore at Crosby, Lancashire.
Jane	United Kingdom	The ship was driven ashore at Greenock. She was on a voyage from Greenock to Jamaica. Jane was later refloated.
John	United Kingdom	The ship foundered in Liverpool Bay. Her crew were rescued. She was on a voyage from Penzance, Cornwall, to Liverpool.
John Roberts	United Kingdom	The brig was driven ashore and wrecked at St. Mawes, Cornwall.
Lady Florence	United Kingdom	The ship was driven ashore at Liverpool.
Lisbon Packet	United Kingdom	The ship was driven ashore at Cobh. She was on a voyage from Liverpool to Porto.
Livetanto	Portugal	The brig was driven ashore at Sandwich, Kent. She was on a voyage from London to Porto.
Maranham	United Kingdom	The ship was wrecked on the Isle of Man. She was on a voyage from Whitehaven, Cumberland, to Jamaica.
Mary	United Kingdom	The ship was driven ashore at Greenock. She was on a voyage from Greenock to Demerara. Mary was refloated on 28 December.
Mercy	United Kingdom	The ship sank at Limerick.
Mersey	United Kingdom	The ship capsized and sank at Limerick. She was refloated the next day.
Messina	United Kingdom	The ship foundered in the North Sea. She was on a voyage from Newcastle upon Tyne to Faversham, Kent.
Montreal	United Kingdom	The ship was driven ashore at Inch Point, Renfrewshire. She was later refloated.
Mourick	United Kingdom	The ship struck the Newcombe Sand, in the North Sea off Great Yarmouth, Norfolk and consequently foundered. Her crew were rescued. She was on a voyage from Newcastle upon Tyne, Northumberland to Plymouth, Devon.
Nancy	United Kingdom	The ship was wrecked at Ardnamurchan Point, Inverness-shire. She was on a voyage from Sligo to Glasgow.
Nedeschda	Russia	The ship was driven ashore in Loch Indaal. She was on a voyage from Narva to Liverpool. Nedeschda was later refloated.
Nelly and Betty	United Kingdom	The sloop was driven ashore either at Liverpool, or at Whitehaven, Cumberland. All on board were rescued.
Oporto	United Kingdom	The ship sank at Cork.
Orion	Prussia	The ship was driven ashore at Ramsgate. She was on a voyage from Memel to Cork.
Patrioten	Sweden	The brig was wrecked at Cobh.~
Pax	Norway	The ship was driven ashore and wrecked at Limerick.
Resolution	flag unknown	The ship was driven ashore on Texel. She was bound for London.
Robert	United Kingdom	The ship was driven ashore in the Water of Orr. She was on a voyage from Liverpool to Larne, County Antrim.
Rosine and Aglae	France	The brig was driven ashore at Ramsgate. She was on a voyage from Marseille, Bouches-du-Rhône to Le Havre, Seine-Inférieure.
St Nicholay Paulowitch	Russia	The ship was driven ashore in Bangor Bay.
Sonia	United Kingdom	The ship was driven ashore and wrecked at Plymouth, Devon.
Success	United Kingdom	The ship was driven ashore at Reculver, Kent but was later refloated. She was on a voyage from Pernambuco, Brazil to London.
Taunton	United Kingdom	The ship foundered in Donegal Bay. Her crew were rescued. She was on a voyage from Sligo to Greenock.
Union	United Kingdom	The brig foundered in the North Sea off the Staples. She was on a voyage from King's Lynn, Norfolk to Leith, Lothian.
Vrouw Temmegina	Elbing	The ship was driven ashore on Vlieland, Friesland, Netherlands. She was on a voyage from Elbing to London. Vrouw Temmegina was refloated on 12 June 1815.
Wicklow	United Kingdom	The schooner was driven ashore and wrecked at Howth, County Dublin. Her crew survived. She was on a voyage from Dublin to Wicklow.
William Leece	United Kingdom	The ship was driven ashore at Lytham St. Annes, Lancashire. All on board were rescued. She was on a voyage from the Isle of Man to Liverpool.
Zephyr	United Kingdom	The ship ran aground on the Ramsden Scar, in the North Sea. She put into Scarborough, Yorkshire, where she sank.
Three unnamed vessels	Flags unknown	The ships were driven ashore in Loch Indaal. They were refloated .

=== 17 December ===
List of shipwrecks: 17 December 1814
Ship	State	Description
Amphion	United Kingdom	The ship was driven ashore and wrecked at Lowestoft, Suffolk. Her crew were rescued. She was on a voyage from Moss, Norway, to London.
Aurora	United Kingdom	The brig was wrecked on the Goodwin Sands, Kent. Her crew survived. She was on a voyage from Calais, France to London.
British Queen	United Kingdom	The ship was wrecked on the Goodwin Sands with the loss of all sixteen people on board. She was on a voyage from Ostend, East Flanders, Netherlands to Dover, Kent.
Caldeonia	United Kingdom	The ship was driven ashore in the River Shannon. She was on a voyage from Pictou, Nova Scotia, British North America to Irvine, Ayrshire.
Fame	United Kingdom	The ship was driven ashore at Cork. She was later refloated.
Harriet	United Kingdom	The ship was driven ashore at Cork. She was on a voyage from Liverpool, Lancashire, to Maranhão, Brazil. Harriet was later refloated.
Industry	United Kingdom	The ship was driven ashore and wrecked at Lowestoft. Her crew were rescued. She was on a voyage from Aldeburgh, Suffolk to Hull, Yorkshire.
John and Betsey	United Kingdom	The ship was wrecked on Sylt. She was on a voyage from London to Hamburg.
Plus Vel Minus	Danzig	The ship was lost near "Holmstadt". She was on a voyage from London to Danzig.
Providence	United Kingdom	The ship was driven ashore and wrecked at Lowestoft. Her crew were rescued. She was on a voyage from Sunderland, County Durham, to Schiedam, South Holland, Netherlands.
Reward	United Kingdom	The ship was lost while on a voyage from Calais to London. Her crew were rescued.
William	United Kingdom	The ship foundered in the North Sea off Spurn Point, Yorkshire with the loss of five of her twelve crew.
Unnamed	France	The brig was driven ashore near Calais. She was on a voyage from Cherbourg, Seine-Inférieure to an English port.

=== 18 December ===
List of shipwrecks: 18 December 1814
Ship	State	Description
Eliza	United Kingdom	The ship was wrecked on the Holderness coast, Yorkshire. Her crew were rescued by rocket apparatus.
Rosario	Spain	The ship was wrecked in the Shetland Islands, United Kingdom with the loss of thirteen of her crew. She was on a voyage from Saint Petersburg, Russia to Málaga.
Sappho	United Kingdom	The ship was driven ashore in Whitesand Bay. She was on a voyage from Liverpool, Lancashire, to Hamburg.
Sovereign	United Kingdom	The ship foundered in the North Sea off Cromer, Norfolk. She was on a voyage from South Shields, County Durham, to Portsmouth, Hampshire.

=== 19 December ===
List of shipwrecks: 19 December 1814
Ship	State	Description
Active	United Kingdom	The ship was wrecked on the Haisborough Sands, in the North Sea off the coast of Norfolk.
Adventure	United Kingdom	The ship was wrecked near Gothenburg, Sweden. She was on a voyage from Hamburg to Hull, Yorkshire.
Jane	United Kingdom	The ship foundered whilst on a voyage from Sunderland, County Durham, to Hastings, Sussex. Her crew were rescued.
Sappho	United Kingdom	The ship was driven ashore at Sandown, Isle of Wight. She was on a voyage from Caen, Calvados, France to Southampton, Hampshire.
Sarah	United Kingdom	War of 1812: The ship was captured and burnt by the privateer Warrior (United States). She was on a voyage from Newfoundland, British North America to Alicante, Spain.
Vrow Sara Johanna	Netherlands	The ship was wrecked at Penzance, Cornwall, United Kingdom. She was on a voyage from Lisbon, Portugal to Amsterdam, North Holland.

=== 20 December ===
List of shipwrecks: 20 December 1814
Ship	State	Description
Euplus or Eupina	Russia	The ship was driven ashore and wrecked near Helsingborg, Sweden. She was on a voyage from Saint Petersburg to London, United Kingdom.
Nancy	United Kingdom	The ship was wrecked on the Herd Sand, in the North Sea off South Shields, County Durham.
Nonsuch	United Kingdom	The ship was driven ashore on Sylt. She was on a voyage from Greenock, Renfrewshire, to Hamburg. Nonsuch was refloated in late March 1816.
Peace	United Kingdom	The ship was lost near Strömstadt, Sweden. She was on a voyage from Saint Petersburg to London.
Pearl	United Kingdom	The ship was wrecked on the Old Head of Kinsale, County Cork. She was on a voyage from London to Dublin.
Rebecca and Mary Ann	United Kingdom	The ship was driven ashore at Warde, Denmark, and was wrecked. Her crew were rescued. She was on a voyage from London to Hamburg.
St. Anne	Netherlands	The ship was lost off Vantava, Courland Governorate. She was on a voyage from Riga, Russia to Amsterdam, North Holland.
Taunton	United Kingdom	The ship foundered in Donegal Bay. Her crew were rescued. She was on a voyage from Sligo to Greenock, Renfrewshire.

=== 21 December ===
List of shipwrecks: 21 December 1814
Ship	State	Description
Hunter	United Kingdom	The ship was lost off the Grand Banks of Newfoundland with some loss of life. She was on a voyage from Jamaica to Liverpool, Lancashire.
Nancy	United Kingdom	The ship was run down and sunk in the Irish Sea. Her crew were rescued. She was on a voyage from Whitehaven or Workington, Cumberland, to Dumfries.
Priscilla	United Kingdom	The ship was driven ashore near Wexford. She was on a voyage from Falmouth, Cornwall, to Bristol, Gloucestershire.
Star	United Kingdom	The ship was wrecked at sea (approximately 40°N 20°W) with the loss of seven of the thirteen people on board. The survivors were rescued on 27 December by a Portuguese schooner.
Vrouw Antoinette	Netherlands	The ship was wrecked near Brielle, South Holland. She was on a voyage from Rotterdam, South Holland to London, United Kingdom.

=== 22 December ===
List of shipwrecks: 22 December 1814
Ship	State	Description
Aberconway	United Kingdom	The ship was driven ashore at Beaumaris, Anglesey. She was later refloated.
Active	United Kingdom	The ship was driven onto rocks at Dunmore East, County Waterford, and was wrecked with the loss of four of her seven crew. She was on a voyage from Chepstow, Monmouthshire to Workington, Cumberland.
Amitie	France	The ship was driven ashore at Portland, Dorset, United Kingdom. She was on a voyage from Le Havre, Seine-Inférieure to Île Bourbon. She was later refloated and taken in to Weymouth, Dorset.
Barbara	United Kingdom	The brig was wrecked on the Slapton Sands, in the English Channel off Dartmouth, Devon. She was on a voyage from Sunderland, County Durham, to Plymouth, Devon.
Elizabeth	United Kingdom	The ship was wrecked in Courtmasherry Bay. She was on a voyage from Burry Port, Glamorgan, to Cork.
Elizabeth and Ann	United Kingdom	The ship struck a rock and sank at Pittenweem, Fife. Her crew were rescued.
Fly	United Kingdom	The ship was driven ashore at Littlehampton, Sussex. She was on a voyage from London to Shoreham-by-Sea, Sussex. Fly was later refloated and taken in to Littlehampton.
Joyce	United Kingdom	The ship was driven ashore near Hurst Castle, Hampshire. She was on a voyage from Gothenburg, Sweden to Waterford. She was refloated on 26 December and taken in to Cowes, Isle of Wight.
London	United Kingdom	The ship was driven ashore and wrecked at Youghal, County Cork. She was on a voyage from Whitehaven, Cumberland, to Jamaica.
Mars	United Kingdom	The ship was driven ashore and wrecked at Sand Head. She was on a voyage from London to Portsmouth, Hampshire.
Medina	United Kingdom	The ship was driven ashore and capsized at Beaumaris.
Milford	United Kingdom	The ship was driven ashore at Wexford. She was on a voyage from Liverpool to Teignmouth, Devon.
Pearl	United Kingdom	The ship was wrecked near the Old Head of Kinsale, County Cork. She was on a voyage from Málaga, Spain to Dublin.
Penryn Castle	United Kingdom	The ship was driven ashore in Start Bay. Her crew were rescued. She was on a voyage from London to Plymouth, Devon. Penryn Castle was refloated on 26 January 1815 and taken in to Dartmouth, Devon.
Ranger	United Kingdom	The ship sank at Whitby, Yorkshire.
Stranger	United Kingdom	The ship ran aground at Malta. She was on a voyage from Smyrna, Ottoman Empire to Grimsby, Lincolnshire. She was refloated and taken in to Malta.
Success	United Kingdom	The ship sank at Beaumaris.
Unity	United Kingdom	The ship was wrecked at sea (51°20′N 15°40′W. Her crew were rescued on 25 December by Thetis (United Kingdom). Unity was on a voyage from Pictou, Nova Scotia, British North America to Lancaster, Lancashire. She was discovered at sea on 19 January 1815 by HMRC Wickham ( Board of Customs) and taken in to Broadhaven Bay.
Unity	United Kingdom	The ship was driven ashore and wrecked at Beaumaris. She was on a voyage from Waterford to Liverpool, Lancashire.
William	United Kingdom	The ship was driven ashore and severely damaged at Beaumaris.

=== 23 December ===
List of shipwrecks: 23 December 1814
Ship	State	Description
Bideford	United Kingdom	The sloop was driven ashore and wrecked at Pentewan, Cornwall. She was on a voyage from London to Penryn, Cornwall.
Drey Freunde	Flag unknown	The ship was driven ashore and wrecked at Leigh-on-Sea, Essex United Kingdom. She was on a voyage from London to São Miguel, Azores, Portugal.
Jenny	United Kingdom	The brig was driven ashore and wrecked at Scalpsie, Isle of Bute. She was on a voyage from Greenock, Renfrewshire, to Jamaica.
Jonge Windelt	Netherlands	The ship was driven ashore at Aldeburgh, Suffolk, United Kingdom. She was on a voyage from Groningen to London.
Vrouw Hendrika	Netherlands	The ship was wrecked on Ameland, Friesland. She was on a voyage from Harlingen, Friesland, to London.

=== 24 December ===
List of shipwrecks: 24 December 1814
Ship	State	Description
Conception	United Kingdom	The ship was driven ashore and wrecked at Ballynascar, County Wexford, with the loss of a crew member. She was on a voyage from Dublin to Wexford.
Nancy	United Kingdom	The ship was wrecked on the Herd Sand, in the North Sea off the coast of County Durham.
Priscilla	United Kingdom	The ship was driven ashore at Wexford. She was on a voyage from Bristol, Gloucestershire to Falmouth, Cornwall.
Thetis	United Kingdom	The brig was driven ashore and wrecked in the River Mersey.
Three Friends	United Kingdom	The ship was driven ashore at "Fronxeiro", Spain with the loss of two of her crew. She was on a voyage from Liverpool to Maranhão, Brazil.

=== 25 December ===
List of shipwrecks: 25 December 1814
Ship	State	Description
Anne Aurora	Hamburg	The ship was driven ashore on the Holderness coast, Yorkshire, United Kingdom. She was on a voyage from Hamburg to Kingston upon Hull, Yorkshire.
Cornwallis	United Kingdom	The ship was wrecked on the Black Middens, in the North Sea off South Shields, County Durham. She was on a voyage from Saint Petersburg, Russia to London.
Sarah	United Kingdom	War of 1812: The ship was captured by the privateer Reindeer (United States) while on a voyage from Newfoundland, British North America to Dublin. She was set afire and sunk.
Unnamed'	Flag unknown	The hoy foundered in the North Sea off Happisburgh, Norfolk, United Kingdom. Se was on a voyage from a Dutch port to London, United Kingdom.

=== 26 December ===
List of shipwrecks: 26 December 1814
Ship	State	Description
John	United Kingdom	The transport ship foundered in the English Channel off Dover, Kent with the loss of seventeen of her twenty crew.
John and Robert	United Kingdom	The ship was driven ashore and wrecked at Cromer, Norfolk. She was on a voyage from Hamburg to London.
Juneta	Spain	The ship was wrecked on the Little Bahama Bank. She was on a voyage from Havana, Cuba to Cádiz.
Negade	Stettin	The ship sprang a leak in the North Sea and was abandoned by her crew. She was on a voyage from Ostend, East Flanders, Netherlands to Bordeaux, Gironde. Negade was later taken in to Whitstable, Kent, United Kingdom.
Princess Wilhelmina	Prussia	The ship was driven ashore at Portsea Island, Hampshire, United Kingdom. She was on a voyage from Swinemünde to Liverpool, Lancashire United Kingdom.
Three Brothers	Hamburg	The galiot was wrecked on the Long Sand, in the North Sea off Harwich, Essex, United Kingdom with the loss of two of her crew. She was on a voyage from Stettin to Bordeaux, Gironde, France.

=== 27 December ===
List of shipwrecks: 27 December 1814
Ship	State	Description
Alert	United Kingdom	The ship was driven ashore at Wells-next-the-Sea, Norfolk. She was on a voyage from Hamburg to London
Betsey	United Kingdom	The ship was wrecked on Copland Isle with the loss of all three crew. She was on a voyage from Portrush, County Antrim, to Newry, County Down.
USS Carolina	United States Navy	War of 1812, Battle of New Orleans: The schooner was shelled and sunk at New Orleans, Louisiana.
Charles or Charlotte	United Kingdom	The ship was driven ashore at Dún Laoghaire, County Dublin. She was on a voyage from London to Dublin.
John	United Kingdom	The transport ship foundered in the English Channel off Dover, Kent with the loss of seventeen of her twenty crew.
Mary	United Kingdom	The ship was driven ashore on the Isle of Skye, Outer Hebrides. She was on a voyage from Gothenburg, Sweden to Liverpool, Lancashire.
Speed	United Kingdom	War of 1812: The ship, which had previously been captured by the privateer Lion (United States), was wrecked near A Coruña, Spain with the loss of all but one of her prize crew.

=== 28 December ===
List of shipwrecks: 28 December 1814
Ship	State	Description
De Jaade	Kingdom of Hanover	The ship was driven ashore and wrecked at Horsea, Norfolk, United Kingdom. Her crew were rescued. She was on a voyage from Hooksiel to London, United Kingdom.
Forth	United Kingdom	The smack was wrecked on the South Ham Sand, in the North Sea off Great Yarmouth, Norfolk. All on board were rescued. She was on a voyage from London to Newcastle upon Tyne, Northumberland.
Halliday	United Kingdom	The ship was driven ashore at North Shields, County Durham. She was on a voyage from Riga, Russia to Plymouth, Devon.
Ploeg	Danzig	The ship was wrecked near Mundesley, Norfolk. She was on a voyage from Danzig to Málaga, Spain.
Three Brothers	Hamburg	The ship was wrecked on the Long Sand, in the North Sea off Harwich, Essex, United Kingdom with the loss of two of her crew. She was on a voyage from Stettin to Bordeaux, Gironde, France.
Unity	United Kingdom	The ship was abandoned by her crew while on a voyage from Pictou, British North America to Lancaster, Lancashire.
Verandering	Kingdom of Hanover	The ship was wrecked at Happisburgh, Norfolk. She was on a voyage from Emden to London.

=== 29 December ===
List of shipwrecks: 29 December 1814
Ship	State	Description
Arinus Marinus	Netherlands	The ship was driven ashore at Gorey, Zeeland. She was on a voyage from Rotterdam, South Holland, to Batavia, Netherlands East Indies.
Frotsoket	Denmark	The ship was wrecked on Skagen. She was on a voyage from Copenhagen to Newcastle upon Tyne, Northumberland, United Kingdom.
Lottery	United Kingdom	The ship foundered in the Bay of Biscay. She was on a voyage from London to Tobago.
Richard and Jane	United Kingdom	The ship was driven ashore at Bridlington, Yorkshire. She was on a voyage from Hamburg to Hull, Yorkshire.
Nimrod	Stettin	The ship struck a sunken wreck between "Mun" and "Stevens" while on a voyage from Stettin to London, United Kingdom. She was beached at Prestoe on 2 January 1815.

=== 30 December ===
List of shipwrecks: 30 December 1814
Ship	State	Description
Farmer's Glory	United Kingdom	The ship foundered in the Irish Sea off the Point of Ayre, Isle of Man during a squall with the loss of one life. She was on a voyage from Rhuddlan, Denbighshire, to Liverpool, Lancashire.
Hercules	United Kingdom	The ship was driven ashore at the mouth of the Kenmare River, County Kerry. She was on a voyage from Miramichi, New Brunswick, British North America to Liverpool. She was later refloated and taken in to "Caulaugh".
Oties	Prussia	The ship ran aground on The Brambles, in The Solent. She was on a voyage from Königsburg to Liverpool.
Virgin de los Delores	Spain	The brig was wrecked on the Goodwin Sands, Kent, United Kingdom. Her crew were rescued. She was on a voyage from London, United Kingdom to Mahón.

=== 31 December ===
List of shipwrecks: 31 December 1814
Ship	State	Description
Britannia	United Kingdom	War of 1812: The ship was captured and burnt by the privateer Whig (United States). She was on a voyage from Newfoundland, British North America to Lisbon, Portugal.
Friends	United Kingdom	The ship was driven ashore and wrecked in Caernarvon Bay. All on board were rescued. She was on a voyage from Plymouth, Devon, to Liverpool, Lancashire.
Race Horse	United Kingdom	War of 1812: The ship was captured by the privateer Whig (United States) while on a voyage from Newfoundland to a Portuguese port. She was set afire and sunk.
Vrouw Antoinette	Netherlands	The ship was wrecked at Brielle, South Holland. She was on a voyage from Rotterdam, South Holland to London, United Kingdom.
Unnamed	United Kingdom	War of 1812:The Sloop was captured by privateer America (United States) in the Atlantic Ocean and was scuttled by gunfire.

=== Unknown date ===
List of shipwrecks: Unknown date in December 1814
Ship	State	Description	
Adelheid	Flag unknown	The ship capsized at Quimper, Finistère, France.	
Anna	United Kingdom	The ship departed from Jamaica for New Brunswick, British North America early in December. No further trace, presumed foundered in the Atlantic Ocean with the loss of all hands.	
Anna Maria	Denmark	The ship was wrecked near Riga, Russia in early December. She was on a voyage from Riga to Copenhagen.	
Aurora	United Kingdom	The ship was driven ashore at Bridlington, East Riding of Yorkshire.	
Beata	Norway	The brig was driven ashore on the Isle of Arran, United Kingdom. Her crew were rescued. She was on a voyage from Trondheim to Newry, County Down, United Kingdom.	
Bedford	United Kingdom	The ship ran aground on The Shingles, off the Isle of Wight. She was on a voyage from London to Buenos Aires, Argentina. She was refloated and taken in to Cowes, Isle of Wight. She resumed her voyage on 2 January 1815.	
Bee	United Kingdom	The ship was run into by a collier brig at Harwich, Essex and was severely damaged. She was on a voyage from the River Trent to London.	
Brunswick	United Kingdom	War of 1812: The ship was captured and burn by the privateer Whig ({{#invoke|flag	1795}}). Brunswick was on a voyage from Glasgow, Renfrewshire to Pará, Brazil.
Camel	Ottoman Navy	The frigate was destroyed by an explosion and fire off Mytilene, Lesbos, Greece.	
Charlotte	United Kingdom	War of 1812: The ship was captured in the Atlantic Ocean (approximately 44°N 17°W) by Macdonough (United States) and was sunk by her. Charlotte was on a voyage from Newfoundland, British North America to A Coruña, Spain.	
Clifton Union	United Kingdom	The ship was wrecked on the Holmes Sandbank. She was on a voyage from Barnstaple, Devon, to Bristol, Gloucestershire.	
Commerce	United Kingdom	The ship was driven ashore at Caernarfon. She was on a voyage from Liverpool to Waterford.	
Diligence	United Kingdom	The ship was wrecked on São Miguel, Azores, Portugal. Her crew were rescued.	
Dixon	United Kingdom	The ship ran ashore on Hogland, Russia. She was on a voyage from Saint Petersburg, Russia to Hull, Yorkshire. She was refloated and taken in to Cronstadt, Russia on 17 December in a waterlogged condition.	
Dolphin	United Kingdom	The ship was driven ashore near Stade, Kingdom of Hanover. She was on a voyage from Sunderland, County Durham, to Hamburg.	
Dorothy	United Kingdom	The ship was driven ashore on the Lincolnshire bank of the Humber with the loss of four of her six crew.	
Eagle	United Kingdom	The ship was driven ashore at "Carbon".	
Elizabeth	United Kingdom	The ship was wrecked on the Vogel Sand, in the North Sea. She was on a voyage from Glasgow, Renfrewshire to Hamburg.	
Exmouth	United Kingdom	The ship was driven ashore. She was on a voyage from Livorno, Grand Duchy of Tuscany to Amsterdam, North Holland, Netherlands. She was refloated on 28 December and taken in to the Torin and Molen Gat.	
Fidelity	United Kingdom	The ship departed from Newfoundland for London in early December. No further trace, presumed foundered with the loss of all hands.	
Five Sisters	(United Kingdom of Great Britain and Ireland) British North America	The ship was wrecked at St. John's, Newfoundland.	
Fortitude	United Kingdom	The ship was run into by Matilda (United Kingdom) in Plymouth Sound and was severely damaged.	
Fortitude	United Kingdom	The ship was wrecked on Hart Island, Nova Scotia, British North America. She was on a voyage fron Newfoundland to Alicante, Spain.	
Frances	United Kingdom	The ship was wrecked in the Gulf of St. Lawrence	
Goodintent	United Kingdom	The ship was wrecked on the Herd Sand, in the North Sea off South Shields, County Durham. She was on a voyage from Dundee, Forfarshire, to Newcastle upon Tyne, Northumberland.	
Gunton	United Kingdom	The ship foundered while on a voyage from Calais, France to London.	
Helsingfors	Russia	The ship was wrecked on Skagen, Denmark. She was on a voyage from Saint Petersburg to London.	
Hibernia	United Kingdom	The ship was driven ashore at Workington, Cumberland.	
Hoppett	Sweden	The ship ran aground off Ystad. She was on a voyage from Ystad to Gothenburg.	
Industry	United Kingdom	The ship was driven ashore near Ryde, Isle of Wight.	
Isaac	United Kingdom	The ship was wrecked at Sutton, Dublin, with the loss of two of her crew. She was on a voyage from Liverpool, Lancashire, to Amsterdam, North Holland, Netherlands.	
James	United Kingdom	The ship foundered in the North Sea off Sylt. She was on a voyage from London to Hamburg.	
Jane	United Kingdom	War of 1812: The ship was captured by the privateer Harpy (United States) before 12 December while on a voyage from Miramichi Bay to the River Clyde. She was set afire and sunk.	
Jane	United Kingdom	The ship was wrecked on the coast of Cuba. She was on a voyage from Jamaica to Halifax, Nova Scotia, British North America.	
Jenny	United Kingdom	The ship was driven ashore on the Isle of Bute. She was on a voyage from the Clyde to Jamaica.	
Jessie	United Kingdom	The ship was abandoned while on a voyage from Pictou, Nova Scotia, British North America to Aberdeen. Her crew were rescued by the privateer General Putnum (United States). Jessie was later discovered by HMS Bellerophon (Royal Navy) and taken in to St. John's, Newfoundland, British North America.	
Johanna	Hamburg	The ship was wrecked on Sylt. Her crew were rescued. She was on a voyage from London to Hamburg.	
John	United Kingdom	The ship foundered in the Bay of Biscay off La Rochelle, Charente-Maritime, France with the loss of all but one of her crew. She was on a voyage from Newcastle upon Tyne to La Rochelle.	
Jubilee	United Kingdom	The ship was wrecked near Dublin. The wreck was plundered by the local inhabitants.	
June	United Kingdom	The ship was wrecked at Barbados. Her crew were rescued. She was on a voyage from London to Bermuda.	
Mais	United Kingdom	The ship was driven ashore at Strand Head, Isle of Wight.	
Maria	United Kingdom	The ship foundered in Rocky Bay, County Cork with the loss of all hands. She was on a voyage from Waterford to Southampton, Hampshire.	
Marianne	Sweden	The ship ran aground off Marstrand. She was on a voyage from Hull, Yorkshire, United Kingdom to Gothenburg.	
Marias	Flag unknown	The ship was wrecked on the coast of Brittany, France. She was on a voyage from Nantes, Loire-Inférieure, France to Lisbon, Portugal.	
Middlesex	United Kingdom	The ship was driven ashore in the Clyde. She was on a voyage from the Clyde to Jamaica. Middlesex was refloated on 25 December and sailed for Cork.	
Mina	Netherlands	The ship was driven ashore at Zandvoort, North Holland. She was on a voyage from London to Rotterdam, South Holland.	
Minerva	Sweden	The ship was wrecked in Loch Eynort.	
Nelson	United Kingdom	The ship was driven ashore at Duncannon, County Wexford. She was on a voyage from Liverpool. Lancashire to Bordeaux, Gironde, France.	
Neptune	United Kingdom	The ship was wrecked on the coast of Sweden. She was on a voyage from London to a Baltic port.	
Ocean	United Kingdom	The ship was wrecked on "Byron Island". Her crew were rescued. She was on a voyage from Quebec, Lower Canada, British North America to Portsmouth, Hampshire.	
Orphans	United Kingdom	The ship departed from Newfoundland in early December. No further trace, presumed foundered with the loss of all hands.	
HDMS Perlen	Royal Danish Navy	The frigate was wrecked near Skagen. Her crew were rescued.	
Perseverant	United Kingdom	The ship foundered in the North Sea off Bridlington, Yorkshire. She was on a voyage from South Shields, County Durham, to London.	
Ploeg	Danzig	The ship was driven ashore at Mundesley, Norfolk, United Kingdom. She was on a voyage from Danzig to Málaga, Spain	
Sally	United Kingdom	The sloop foundered in the English Channel between Le Havre and La Hèe, Seine-Inférieure, France on or before 22 December with the loss of all hands.	
Sally	United Kingdom	The ship departed from Hull for Seville, Spain. No further trace, presumed foundered with the loss of all hands.	
Sophia	Russia	The ship was wrecked at "Arnsbay". She was on a voyage from Riga to Gävle, Sweden.	
Speculation	Norway	The ship was lost off Reval, Russia early in December.	
Speedy	United Kingdom	The ship was wrecked at St. Ann's Head, Pembrokeshire Her crew were rescued. She was on a voyage from Bristol, Gloucestershire, to Guernsey, Channel Islands.	
Swift	United Kingdom	The ship departed Jamaica for New Brunswick. No further trace, presumed foundered in the Atlantic Ocean with the loss of all hands.	
St. Johannes	Norway	The ship was wrecked at Marstrand, Sweden with the loss of all but one of her crew. She was on a voyage from Sheerness, Kent to Christiana.	
Triton	Prussia	The ship was wrecked near Marstrand, Sweden. She was on a voyage from Newcastle upon Tyne to Königsberg.	
Twee Gebroeders	Kingdom of Hanover	The ship was driven ashore at "Treestone", Lincolnshire, United Kingdom. She was on a voyage from Leer to London.	
Vainol	United Kingdom	The ship was wrecked at Le Havre, Seine-Inférieure, France.	
Verandering	Kingdom of Hanover	The ship was driven ashore at Mundesley. She was on a voyage from Emden to London.	
Valette	United Kingdom	The ship was driven ashore and wrecked at Warkworth, Northumberland. She was on a voyage from Rotterdam, South Holland, Netherlands to Leith, Lothian.	
Volant	United Kingdom	The cutter was driven ashore at Sunderland, County Durham.	
Vrouw Jeltje	Netherlands	The ship was driven ashore and wrecked at Kirkley, Suffolk. Her crew were rescued. She was on a voyage from London to Amsterdam, North Holland.	
William and Ann	United Kingdom	The ship was driven ashore on the Isle of Wight. She was refloated on 30 December and taken in to Cowes.	
Frau Geysna	Netherlands	The ship was driven ashore near Mundesley. She was later refloated and taken in to Great Yarmouth, Norfolk, where she arrived on 23 February 1815.	

== Unknown date ==
List of shipwrecks: Unknown date in 1814
Ship	State	Description
Argo	(United Kingdom of Great Britain and Ireland) India	Convicts stole the ship, which foundered off Van Diemen's Land with the loss of all hands.
Atlas	United Kingdom	The ship was lost in the River Plate.
Ben Bovill	United Kingdom	War of 1812: The schooner was captured and sunk between New York, United States and Saint Barthélemy by the privateer Hollins (United States).
Baltic	United Kingdom	The ship was wrecked near Cape Torment, British North America in late June or early July. She was on a voyage from Miramichi Bay to Liverpool, Lancashire.
Betsey	United Kingdom	The ship was lost in the River Plate.
Doris	United Kingdom	War of 1812: The ship was captured and sunk by the privateer Surprize (United States). She was on a voyage from Cork to Pictou, Nova Scotia, British North America.
Eclipse	United Kingdom	War of 1812: The schooner was captured by the privateer Wasp (United States). She was beached near New York and burnt.
Eliza	United Kingdom	The full-rigged ship foundered off the "Comaynes". She was on a voyage from St. Jago de Cuba to Liverpool, Lancashire.
Eliza	United Kingdom	The brig foundered while on a voyage from Jamaica to Havana, Cuba.
Eliza Ann	(United Kingdom of Great Britain and Ireland) Virgin Islands	The ship foundered in the Atlantic Ocean off Bermuda. Her crew were rescued.
Elizabeth	United Kingdom	War of the Sixth Coalition: The ship was captured and destroyed by French frigate Clorinde (French Navy). She was on a voyage from the Baltic to Madeira.
Ellen	United Kingdom	The ship was wrecked on Prince Edward Island, British North America in late June or early July.
Ellen	United Kingdom	The ship was lost off Saint Vincent. Her crew were rescued. She was on a voyage from Surinam to Halifax, Nova Scotia, British North America.
Esther	United Kingdom	The ship was wrecked off Senegal.
Experience	United Kingdom	War of 1812: The ship was captured by the privateer Caroline (United States) and was driven ashore near St Jago de Cuba. She was on a voyage from Jamaica to Gonaives, Cuba.
Fairy	United Kingdom	The ship was blown out to sea and foundered 60 nautical miles (110 km) west of Cape Clear Island, County Cork. Her crew were rescued. She was on a voyage from King's Cove to St. John's, Newfoundland, British North America.
Fame	United Kingdom	The ship was lost on the coast of Africa. Her crew were rescued.
Favorite	United Kingdom	The ship was destroyed by fire on the coast of Africa.
Flor do Brazil	Portugal	War of the Sixth Coalition: The ship was captured and destroyed by the French. She was on a voyage from Porto to Pernambuco, Brazil.
Flora	United Kingdom	War of the Sixth Coalition: The ship was captured and destroyed by Clorinde (French Navy) She was on a voyage from London to Rio de Janeiro.
HMS Florida	Royal Navy	The ship departed from Bermuda for the West Indies. No further trace, presumed foundered with the loss of all hands.
Forth	United Kingdom	War of 1812: The ship was captured and burnt by a privateer. She was on a voyage from Halifax to the Clyde.
Fortune	(United Kingdom of Great Britain and Ireland) New South Wales	The ship foundered.
General Doyle	United Kingdom	War of 1812: The ship was captured and burnt by the privateer Neufchatel (United States). She was on a voyage from Livorno, French Empire to Bristol.
Harriet	United Kingdom	The ship was captured by an American privateer while on a voyage from Porto to the Canary Islands, Spain. She was set afire and sunk.
Jane	United Kingdom	The ship was lost at Barbados. Her crew were rescued. She was on a voyage from London to Madeira and Dominica.
Jason	(United Kingdom of Great Britain and Ireland) Bermuda	War of 1812: The schooner was captured by the privateer Caroline (United States). She was set afire and sunk.
Jolly Tar	United Kingdom	The ship sprang a leak and was abandoned in the Atlantic Ocean. She was on a voyage from Liverpool to Newfoundland.
Leith Packet	United Kingdom	War of 1812: The ship was captured and sunk by USS Peacock (United States Navy) between 29 July and 5 August. She was on a voyage from Tenerife, Canary Islands, to Dublin.
Lord Cochrane	United Kingdom	The ship was driven ashore on Öland, Sweden. She was on a voyage from Saint Petersburgh, Russia to Portsmouth, Hampshire. She had been refloated by 4 December.
Lord Hood	United Kingdom	War of 1812: The ship was captured and burnt by the privateer Scourge (United States). She was on a voyage from Saint John, New Brunswick, British North America to Liverpool.
Lord Rodney	United Kingdom	War of the Sixth Coalition: The ship was captured and sunk by two French frigates. She was on a voyage from British Honduras to London.
Mary	United Kingdom	The ship foundered off Goree, South Holland, Netherlands. Her crew were rescued. She was on a voyage from St. Ubes, Spain to Rotterdam, South Holland.
Milo	United States	The ship foundered in the Atlantic Ocean. Her crew were rescued. She was on a voyage from New York to Cádiz, Spain.
Oak Hall	United Kingdom	The transport ship was list at Livorno, French Empire.
Oscar	United Kingdom	War of the Sixth Coalition: The ship was captured and sunk off Madeira by Circé and Pallas (both French Navy). She was on a voyage from Liverpool to New Providence, Bahamas.
Patty	United Kingdom	War of 1812: The cutter was captured by the privateer Wasp (United States) and sunk.
HMS Peacock	Royal Navy	The ship departed from Bermuda for the West Indies. No further trace, presumed foundered with the loss of all hands.
Peggy & Jane	United Kingdom	War of 1812: The ship was captured and sunk by USS Peacock (United States Navy) between 29 July and 5 August. She was on a voyage from Liverpool to Limerick.
Prickle	United Kingdom	War of 1812: The ship was captured and burnt by the privateer Pike (United States).
Rambler	United Kingdom	War of 1812: The brig was captured by USS Enterprise and USS Rattlesnake (both United States Navy) before 8 March. She was set afire and sunk. Rambler was on a voyage from Cap-François, Haiti to Saint Thomas, Virgin Islands.
Rodney	United Kingdom	The ship was lost at British Honduras.
Rover	United Kingdom	The ship was wrecked "in the Bonair". She was on a voyage from London to Curaçao.
Royalist	United Kingdom	The whaler was lost in the Davis Strait with the loss of all hands.
Santa Cruz	Portugal	The ship foundered in the Atlantic Ocean off Pará, Brazil with the loss of all hands. She was on a voyage from Pará to Lisbon.
Sarah	United Kingdom	War of the Sixth Coalition: The ship was captured and destroyed by French frigate Clorinde (French Navy). She was on a voyage from London to Berbice.
Shetchley	United Kingdom	The ship was in collision with a Royal Navy vessel and sank. She was on a voyage from British Honduras to London.
Sir James Yeo	United Kingdom	The ship was wrecked on Crooked Island, Bahamas. She was on a voyage from Jamaica to Halifax.
Tyrole	United Kingdom	War of 1812: The ship was captured and burnt by the privateer Grand Turk (United States).
Unity	United Kingdom	War of the Sixth Coalition: The ship was captured and destroyed by French frigate Clorinde (French Navy). She was on a voyage from Tenerife, Canary Islands, to London.
Vittoria	Spain	War of the Sixth Coalition: The ship was captured and sunk by a French frigate. She was on a voyage from London to Barbados and Havana.
Wilhelmina	Sweden	War of 1812: The galiot was captured by the letter of marque Kemp (United States). She was set afire and sunk.
William & Ann	United Kingdom	War of 1812: The ship was captured and sunk by USS Peacock (United States Navy) between 29 July and 5 August. She was on a voyage from Glasgow to Clare, Ireland.
