= Ordronaux =

Ordronaux may refer to:

- John Ordronaux (privateer) (1778-1841), French-American privateer
- John Ordronaux (doctor) (1830-1908), American physician and lawyer, son of John Ordronaux (privateer)
- USS Ordronaux (DD-617), United States Navy World War II Benson-class destroyer
