= Henry Hope (disambiguation) =

Henry Hope (1735–1811) was an Amsterdam merchant banker.

Henry Hope may also refer to:

- Henry Hope (Isle of Man lieutenant governor), lieutenant governor of the Isle of Man, 1773–1775
- Henry Hope (Quebec lieutenant governor) (c. 1746–1789), British Army officer and uncle of the Royal Navy officer
- Henry Philip Hope (1774–1839), art and gem collector who owned the Hope Diamond
- Henry Hope (Royal Navy officer) (1787–1863), nephew of the British Army officer and lieutenant governor
- Henry Hope (politician) (1912–1965), Australian politician
- Henry Thomas Hope (1808–1862), British MP and patron of the arts
- Henry Hope, 3rd Baron Rankeillour (1899–1967), Scottish landowner, soldier and barrister
- Henry Pelham-Clinton-Hope, 9th Duke of Newcastle (1907–1988), British peer and aviator

== See also ==
- Harry Hope (disambiguation)
