= John Ordronaux =

John Ordronaux may refer to:

- John Ordronaux (doctor) (1830–1908), American Civil War army surgeon and professor
- John Ordronaux (privateer) (1778–1841), privateer during the War of 1812
