= Red Rover (clipper) =

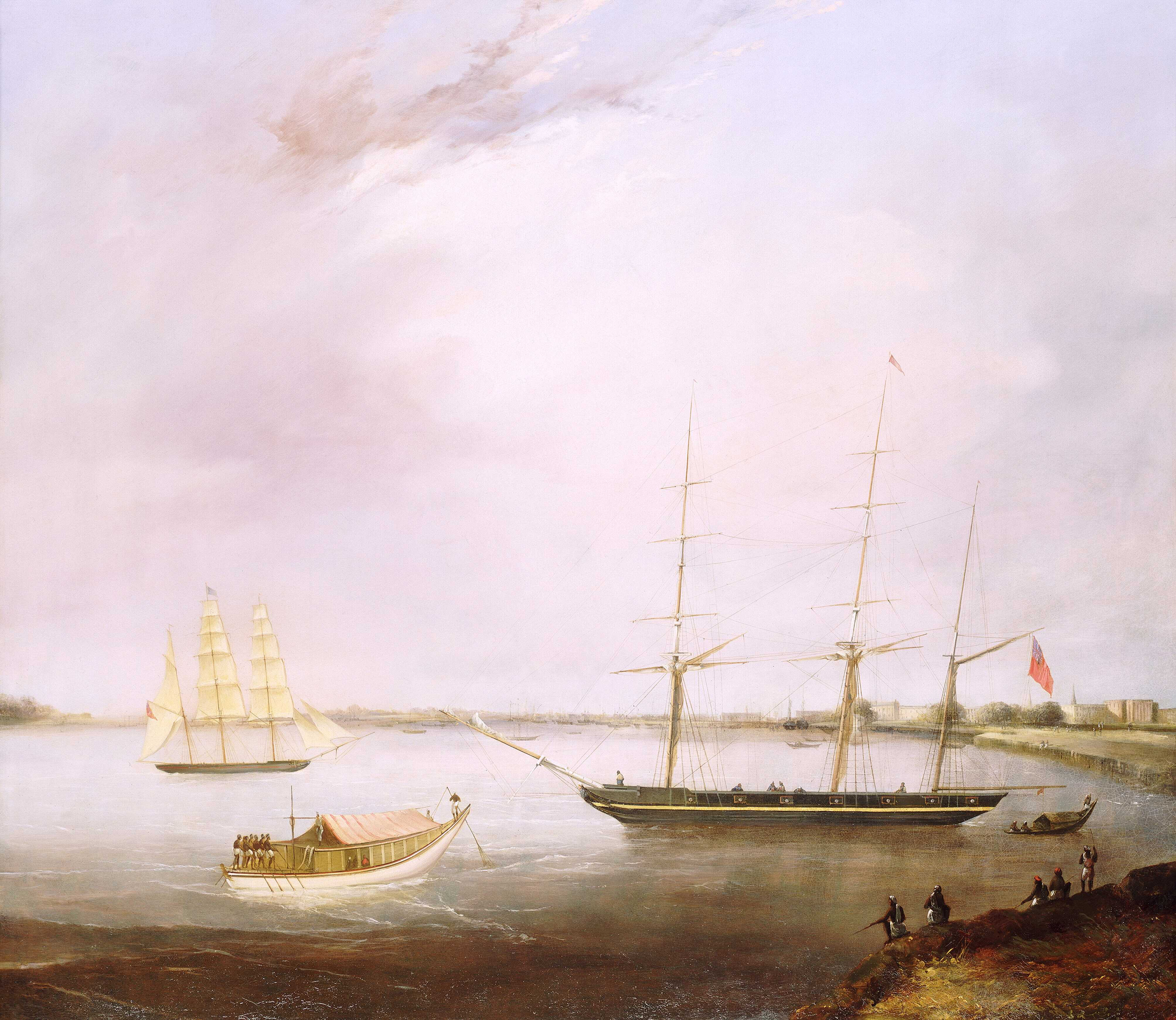
- The opium clipper Red Rover (left) and the Streatham on the Hooghly river in the 1830s

History

- Name: Red Rover
- Owner: Captain William Clifton
- Builder: Captain William Clifton, Howrah
- Launched: 1830
- Acquired: Jardine, Matheson & Co., 1832

General characteristics
- Class & type: Opium clipper
- Tons burthen: 254 (bm)
- Length: 97 ft (29.5656000 m)
- Beam: 24 ft (7 m)
- Draught: 11 ft (3 m)
- Sail plan: Barque

Red Rover was the name of two clipper ships.

== Red Rover, opium clipper ==
Red Rover, built in 1829, was a 254-ton clipper "built, owned, and operated" by Captain William Clifton which was "one of the fastest" opium clippers running between Calcutta and Lintin in the 1830s. Red Rover was modeled after an American War of 1812 blockade runner, Prince de Neufchatel, and was "the first clipper to sail to Canton against the wind."

The well-known firm of Jardine, Matheson & Co. held shares in the ship beginning in 1832.

== Red Rover, California clipper ==
United States
- Name: Red Rover
- Builder: Fernald & Pettigrew, Portsmouth, New Hampshire
- Launched: 1852
- Renamed: Sold to James Baines & Co., Liverpool, for $25.000 in 1861, renamed Young Australia
- Fate: Wrecked on Moreton Island, May 1872

General characteristics
- Class & type: Clipper

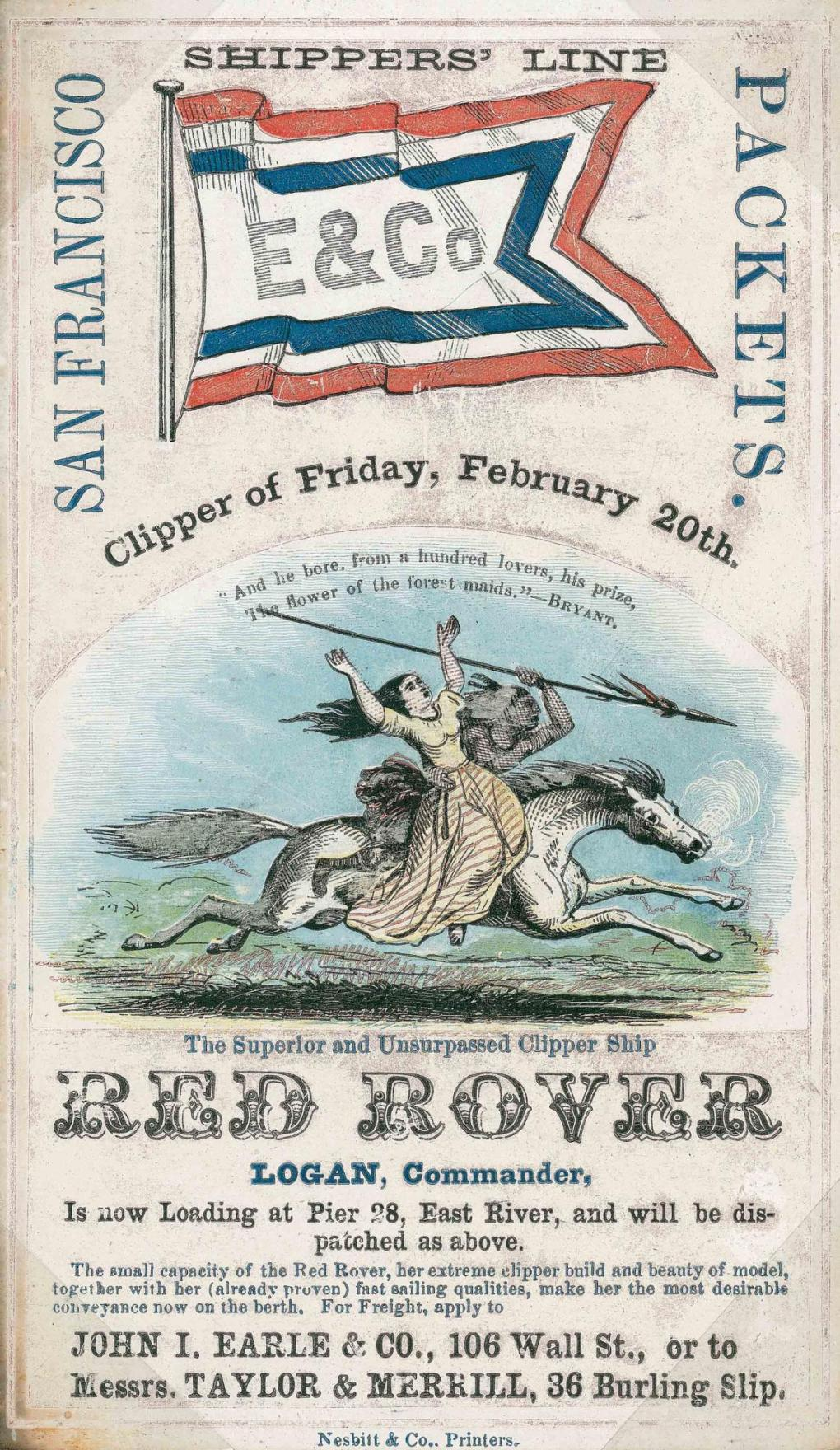
The second Red Rover Clipper ship, her sailing card

A second clipper named Red Rover, active in the California trade, was built by Fernald & Pettigrew in 1852. Between 22 January – 2 May 1854, the ship sailed from New York to San Francisco in 120 (122) days. The Seaman's Bride and Winged Racer which left New York one respectively two days after the Red Rover arrived at San Francisco on 23 May.

Red Rover was damaged in the 26–27 December 1853 fire which destroyed the clipper Great Republic.

Later, the ship served in the guano trade, sailing "from Baker's Island with a cargo of guano to Hampton Roads in 99 days," between 28 August – 5 December 1860.
