= French frigate Égyptienne =

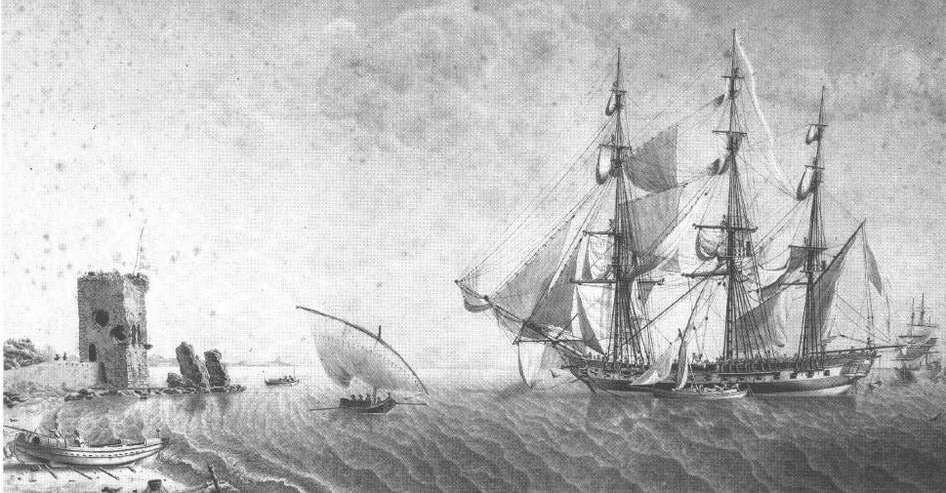
- Portrait of Égyptienne by Jean-Jacques Baugean

History

France
- Name: Égyptienne
- Builder: Toulon
- Laid down: 26 September 1798
- Launched: 17 July 1799
- Completed: November 1799
- Captured: 2 September 1801, by the Royal Navy

United Kingdom
- Name: Egyptienne
- Acquired: 2 September 1801
- Fate: Sold for breaking up 30 April 1817

General characteristics
- Type: 40-gun fifth-rate frigate
- Tons burthen: 1,434 4/94 (bm)
- Length: 169 ft 8 in (51.71 m) (overall); 141 ft 4 3/4 in (43.1 m) (keel)
- Beam: 43 ft 8 in (13.31 m)
- Depth of hold: 15 ft 1 in (4.60 m)
- Sail plan: Full-rigged ship
- Complement: French service:400-450; British service:330
- Armament: French service; UD:28 × 24-pounder guns; QD:12 × 8-pounder guns + 2 × 36-pounder brass obusiers; Fc:4 × 8-pounder guns + 2 × 36-pounder brass obusiers; British service; UD:28 × 24-pounder guns; QD:2 × 9-pounder guns + 12 × 32-pounder carronades; Fc: 2 × 9-pounder guns + 4 × 32-pounder carronades

Égyptienne was 48-gun Forte-class frigate of the French Navy launched at Toulon in 1799. Her first service was in Napoleon's Egyptian campaign of 1801, in which the British captured her at Alexandria. She famously carried the Rosetta Stone to Woolwich, and then the Admiralty commissioned her into the Royal Navy as the 40-gun fifth-rate HMS Egyptienne. She served in a number of single-ship actions before being reduced to harbour service in 1807, and was sold for breaking in 1817.

== Design and construction ==
Égyptienne was part of the two-ship Forte class of frigates designed by François Caro. She had possibly been ordered on 15 June 1798 as a 74-gun ship-of-the-line of about 1,700 French tons, or 1,900 English tons (the evidence is ambiguous). She was begun at Toulon on 26 September 1798 but while building she was modified into a heavy frigate based on Forte. She was launched 17 July 1799, put into service in November 1799 and armed at Toulon on 23 September 1800. The foremost maindeck port was found too curved in the bow to admit a gun, so Égyptienne received only 48 cannon instead of 50.

== French service ==
In 1801 Napoleon required reinforcements in Egypt so the frigates Égyptienne and Justice, each carrying troops and munitions, left Toulon. On 3 February the vessels anchored in the old or western port of Alexandria.

The British discovered Causse, Égyptienne, Justice, Régénérée and two ex-Venetian frigates in the harbour of Alexandria at the capitulation on 2 September 1801 after the fall of Alexandria. The British and their Turkish allies agreed to a division of the spoils; the British received Egyptienne, Régénérée and Léoben (ex-Venetian Medusa) (26) while the Ottomans under Küçük Hüseyin Pasha received Causse (ex-Venetian Vulcano) (64), Justice (46), Mantoue (ex-Venetian Cerere) (26), and several Ottoman corvettes that were in the harbour. Admiral Lord Keith commander of the naval forces, gave the value of Égyptienne for prize money purposes at £23,665 0s 0d.

The British took Égyptienne into service on 27 September and Captain Thomas Stephenson sailed her to Britain; on this voyage she carried Colonel Tomkyns Hilgrove Turner, who was bringing the Rosetta Stone to England. As Égyptienne was coming into the Downs she collided with the East Indiaman Marquise Wellsley. She finally arrived at Woolwich on 13 February 1802.

== British service ==
The Admiralty added her to the Royal Navy as HMS Egyptienne and she was fitted out at Woolwich between October and December 1802, at a cost of £12,625. During this period she was under the command of Captain Charles Ogle.

She commissioned under Captain Charles Fleeming (or Elphinstone or Fleming) in April 1803 and initially sailed in the English Channel and off the coast of France. Here, on 27 July, she captured the 16-gun French brig-sloop Epervier in the Atlantic Ocean. Epervier had a crew of 90 men and was carrying dispatches from Guadaloupe to Lorient. The Royal Navy took Épervier into service under her existing name.

On 30 August Egyptienne captured the privateer Chiffonette. Chiffonette was armed with 16 guns and a crew of 80 men. She was 26 days out of Bordeaux and had captured a brig from Jersey that Endymion had already recaptured. Chiffonette was in the process of attacking another British brig when Egyptienne approached, an attack that Chiffonette then abandoned. Fleming remarked in his report that she was an extremely fast vessel that had several times eluded British frigates, including Egyptienne herself on one occasion.

Then she sailed to St Helena escorting a convoy of ships. During this time Charles John Napier was a midshipman aboard Egyptienne. (In later years, feeling that Fleeming had treated him badly, Napier challenged Fleeming to a duel; their seconds effected a reconciliation, so eviting the duel.) On 13 February 1805 Egyptienne captured the Dichoso, which was under the command of F. Caselins.

Egyptienne was present at the Battle of Cape Finisterre, but did not participate in the engagement. While reconnoitering in advance of the fleet she captured a Danish merchant brig. After the battle she took the disabled Spanish 74-gun Firme in tow. After the battle, Admiral Robert Calder requested a court-martial to review his decision not to pursue the enemy fleet after the engagement. Fleming was one of the witnesses. The court martial ruled that Calder's failure to pursue was an error of judgment, not a manifestation of cowardice, and severely reprimanded him.

On 2 October Egyptienne captured the French brig-sloop Actéon, under Capitaine de frégate Depoge, off Rochefort. She was armed with sixteen 6-pounder guns and had a crew of 126 men. Actéon had on board a colonel and some recruits, as well as arms and clothing for a regiment in the West Indies. The navy took Actéon into service as Acteon.

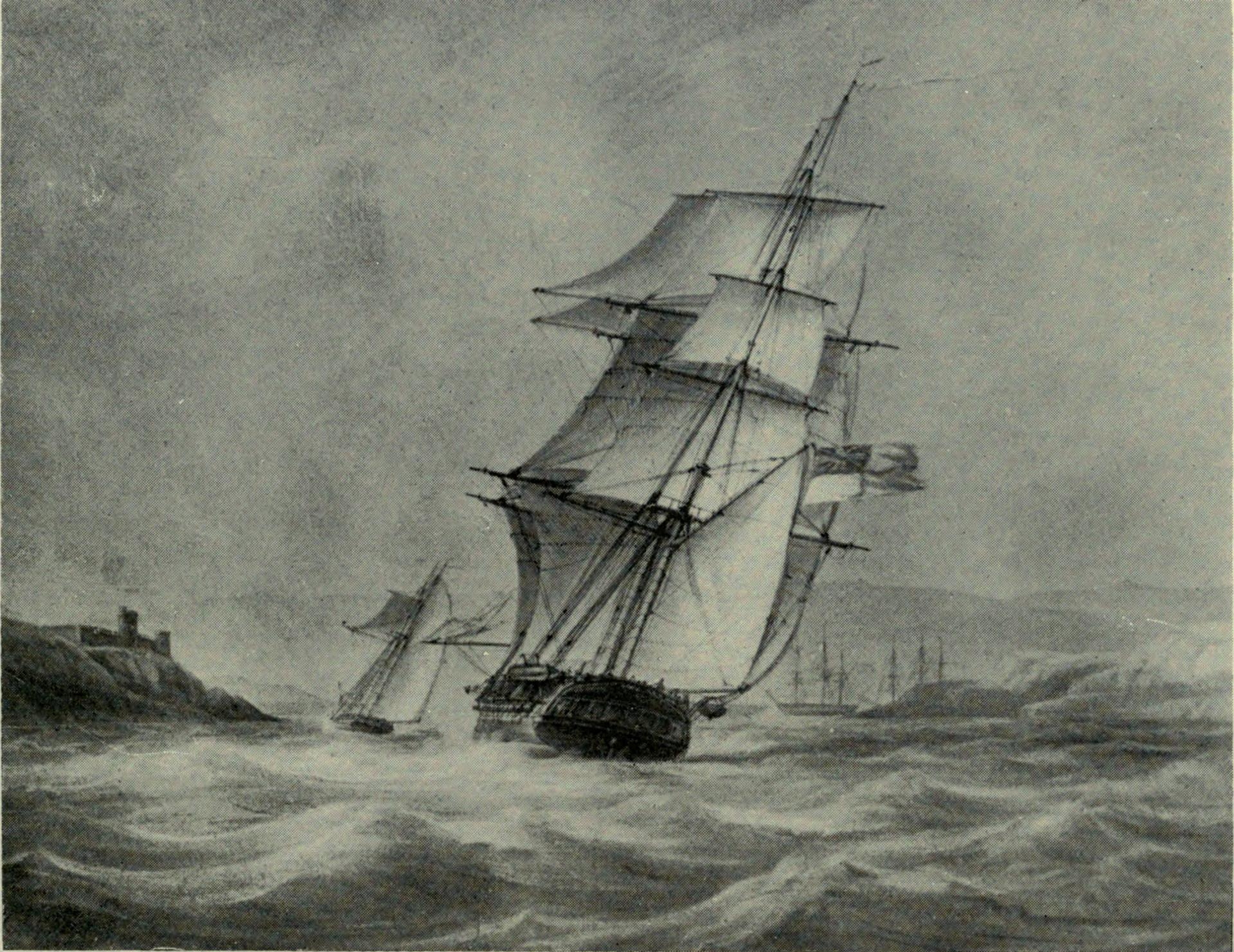
HMS Egyptienne in pursuit of a Spanish schooner in 1806

In November Egyptienne captured several ships: Paulina, the French lugger Edouard, Maria Antoinette, under the command of J. Heget, and the French sloop Esperance. Paulina, which Egyptienne captured on 20 November, was a 12-gun Spanish letter of marque, under the command of Don Antonio Acibal. The chase took nine hours, during which Paulina threw eight of her guns overboard. She was out of Pasaia, Spain on her way to cruise the West Indies.

On 24 December off Rochefort, Egyptienne, under Lieutenant Handfield, his promotion still not confirmed, and Captain Frederick Lewis Maitland's HMS Loire captured the 40-gun Libre, Capitaine de Frégate Deschorches commanding. Libre was armed with twenty-four 18-pounders, six 36-pounder carronades and ten 9-pounder guns. In the fight, which lasted half an hour, the French lost 20 men killed and wounded out of a crew of 280 men. Loire had no casualties but Egyptienne had 8 wounded, one mortally. Libre was badly damaged and had lost her masts so Loire took her in tow and reached Plymouth with her on 4 January 1806. Libre had sailed from Flushing on 14 November in company with a French 48-gun frigate but the two vessels had parted in a gale on 9 November off the coast of Scotland.

Captain Charles Paget replaced Elphinstone in December. Egyptienne's boats cut out the privateer Alcide from Muros on 8 March 1806 and under incessant but ineffective fire from two shore batteries. The boats were under the command of Phillips Crosby Handfield, her first lieutenant, who stayed with Egyptienne as a volunteer as his promotion to commander had not been confirmed. Alcide was frigate-built and pierced for 34 guns. She was only two years old and when she had last gone to sea had had a complement of 240 men. The Royal Navy took Alcide into service as HMS Muros.

== Fate ==
Egyptienne was paid off at Plymouth and put into ordinary on 5 May 1807. Soon after she was fitted out and served as a receiving ship at Plymouth. She was in ordinary from 1812 to 1815. On 30 April 1817 she was finally sold to John Small Sedger for £2,810 for breaking up.
