= Henry Hope (Royal Navy officer) =

Royal Navy officer (1787–1863)

Admiral Sir Henry Hope KCB
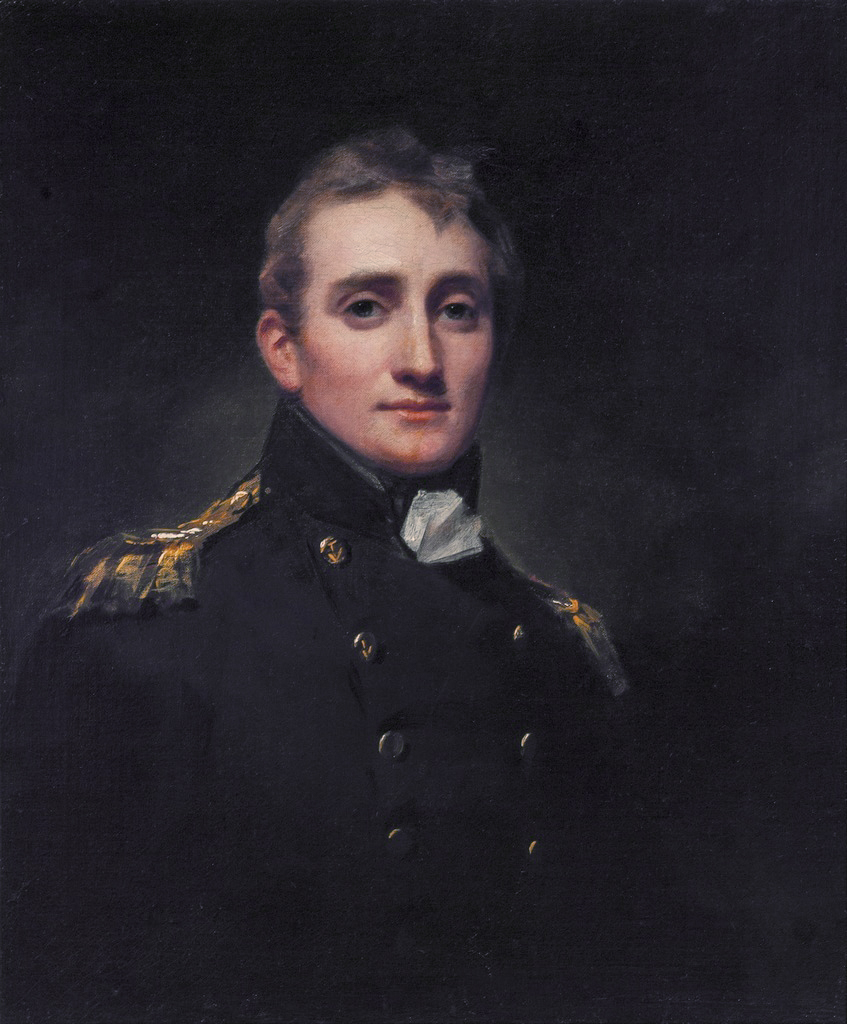
- c. 1815 portrait of Hope by Sir Henry Raeburn
- Born: 10 May 1787; Wellington, Somerset
- Died: 23 September 1863 (aged 76)
- Military career
- Allegiance: Great Britain; United Kingdom
- Branch: Royal Navy
- Service years: 1798–1863
- Rank: Admiral
- Commands: HMS Espoir; HMS Glatton; HMS Leonidas; HMS Topaze; HMS Salsette; HMS Endymion
- Conflicts: French Revolutionary Wars; French invasion of Egypt and Syria; Action of 24 June 1801 (POW); Napoleonic Wars; Battle of Blaauwberg; Battle of Maguelone; War of 1812; Capture of USS President
- Awards: Companion of the Bath (1815); Knight Commander of the Bath (1860)

Admiral Sir Henry Hope KCB (10 May 1787 – 23 September 1863) was a Royal Navy officer who served in the French Revolutionary and Napoleonic Wars and War of 1812. As captain of HMS Endymion, he was involved in the action on 14 January 1815 which ended in the capture of the American warship USS President.

== Early years ==
Hope was the eldest son of Charles Hope, the grandson of Charles Hope-Vere, and the nephew of the army officer Henry Hope. On 2 April 1798, he joined the yacht Princess Augusta on the River Thames as a 3rd Class volunteer. In May 1800, he transferred as a midshipman to the 74-gun ship of the line Kent, which was under the command of his cousin, Captain William Johnstone Hope. Kent took Lieutenant-General Sir Ralph Abercrombie to Egypt where he commanded the British campaign to drive the French out of Egypt. She then served in blockade of Alexandria. Hope transferred to Swiftsure, another 74-gun third rate.

Whilst Swiftsure was at sea, her captain, Benjamin Hallowell, learnt that a French squadron under Admiral Honoré Joseph Antoine Ganteaume had put to sea. Hallowell decided to return to reinforce Sir John Warren's squadron, but on 24 June 1801 Swiftsure encountered Ganteaume's force, which quickly overtook the damaged, slow, and undermanned Swiftsure. The French force consisted of four ships of the line and a frigate. The Indivisible and Dix-Août succeeded in shooting away Swiftsure's yards and masts, forcing her to strike her colours. Two men were killed, two were mortally wounded, and another six were wounded aboard Swiftsure, whilst the French lost 33 killed and wounded. Hope was taken prisoner. (The French Navy took Swiftsure into service under her existing name.)

Hope was freed in September and joined the frigate HMS Leda, which was under the command of Captain George Johnstone Hope. He continued to serve on Leda in the Mediterranean and the Home station under Captains John (or James) Hardy and Robert Honyman (or Honeyman). (Note: O'Byrne gives the names of the two captains as Thomas Masterman Hardy and Robert Honyman. The name John or James Hardy is from Winfield.) In June 1803 Hope left Leda and transferred to the 74-gun third rates Defence and later the Atlas under captains George Johnstone Hope and William Johnstone Hope.

== Commissioned officer ==
Hope was appointed lieutenant on 3 May 1804. He then joined Captain George Burlton in the 50-gun fourth rate Adamant, which had just spent a year undergoing refitting. Hope then sailed with Captain Ross Donnelly on the 32-gun frigate Narcissus. He was with Narcissus when the British captured Dutch Cape Colony in the Battle of Blaauwberg. Hope was promoted to commander on 22 January 1806 and was appointed to command the Cruizer-class brig-sloop HMS Espoir. He served on her until January 1808. Hope then served under Captain Thomas Seccombe aboard the 56-gun HMS Glatton.

In January 1808 Glatton and the brig-sloop Delight had received information that the French had captured four Sicilian gunboats and taken them into Scylla, near Reggio, Calabria. On 31 January 1808, as Delight approached the port, a strong current pushed her towards the shore and she grounded. Seccombe went on board Delight to supervise the recovery effort. As they were trying to free Delight, her boats and those of Glatton came under intense fire from the shore. They were unsuccessful in freeing Delight, and Delight's captain, Commander Phillip Crosby Handfield, late of Egyptienne, and many of his crew were killed. Although the crew took to the boats, not all were able to escape and a number of the men on her, including Seccombe, became prisoners of war. Glatton came under the command of Commander Henry Hope (acting) until March 1808.

On 22 May 1808 Hope was made post captain. He took command of the 36-gun fifth rate frigate HMS Leonidas on 17 November. Next, Hope took command of the 32-gun frigate HMS Topaze on 4 May 1809. In October 1809, a squadron under Rear-Admiral George Martin, of Cuthbert Collingwood's fleet, chased a French convoy off the south of France. They succeeded in driving two of the three escorting ships of the line, Robuste and Lion, ashore near Frontignan, where their crews burnt them after dismantling them and stripping them of all usable material. The crews of the third ship of the line, Borée, and the frigate Pauline escaped into Sète.

The transports that had been part of the convoy, including the armed storeship Lamproie, of 18 guns, two bombards (Victoire and Grondeur), and the xebec Normande, sailed into the Bay of Rosas where they hoped that the castle of Rosas, Fort Trinidad and several shore batteries would protect them. On 30 October Topaze, and other ships sent in their boats. By the following morning the British had accounted for all eleven vessels in the bay, burning those they did not bring out. Some of the British boats took heavy casualties; Topaze lost four men killed and eight men wounded.

On 21 June 1810, the boats of Alceste and Topaze captured two vessels in the bay of Martino in Corsica. (Note: This may be San-Martino-di-Lota, near Bastia.) A landing party captured a battery of three guns that protected the entrance to the bay. They were able to capture and render the guns unserviceable, and kill or wound a number of the garrison. The British lost one man killed and two wounded in the action. On 24 August Topaze captured the Centinelle. Topaze was also involved in the Battle of Fuengirola in October 1810.

In 1811 Hope took command of HMS Salsette, a Perseverance-class fifth-rate frigate of a nominal 36 guns. On 29 June 1811 she captured the slave ship Expedition off Mauritius. On 21 April 1812, Salsette captured the French privateer Comète in the Mediterranean. She carried two 18-pounder guns and had a crew of 45 men. Then on 14 October 1812 Salsette captured the three-masted lugger Mercure off the Isle of Wight. (Note: Ouseley reports that she was the former Marie Louise of Cherbourg.) This vessel carried 16 guns and had a crew of 70, and Salsette took her into Portsmouth.

== War of 1812 ==
Captain Hope took command of HMS Endymion on 13 May 1813. Endymion was a 40-gun fifth rate frigate that was being fitted out at Plymouth to counter the American 44-gun frigates, which had made an impact during the early engagements during the War of 1812. Hope then sailed Endymion to the Halifax station. On 7 March 1814, Endymion, Belvidera and Rattler captured the American privateer Mars, which was armed with 15 guns and had a crew of 70 men. In August 1814, together with Armide, Endymion captured the American privateer Herald, of 17 guns and 100 men. In late 1814, Endymion joined the blockading-squadron off New York.

On 11 October 1814, Endymion's boats attempted to capture the American privateer Prince de Neufchatel, but were unsuccessful. Becalmed on the south side of Nantucket, Prince de Neufchatel appeared vulnerable. Hope sent 111 men in five boats to cut out the privateer, which was manned by a crew of 40. After 20 minutes of savage fighting, the boarders were repulsed. British casualties amounted to 28 killed, 37 wounded and 28 captured, while the Americans reported suffering 7 men killed and 24 wounded.

== Capture of USS President ==
On 14 January 1815, USS President, under the command of Commodore Stephen Decatur, left New York for the Indian Ocean. She then fell in with the British blockading squadron, consisting of the razee Majestic (56 guns, Captain John Hayes), and the frigates Endymion (Captain Henry Hope), Pomone (38 guns, Captain John Richard Lumley), and Tenedos (38 guns, Captain Hyde Parker). Immediately, the British squadron gave chase with Majestic leading. At noon, Endymion, being the much better sailer, overhauled her squadron and left them behind. At 2 pm she gained on the President and shortly afterwards both ships exchanged broadsides, with President still trying to escape. Endymion was able to rake President three times and did considerable damage to her; by contrast, President primarily directed her fire at Endymion's rigging in order to slow her down.

At 7.58pm, President struck, hoisting a light in her rigging to signify her surrender. Endymion hove to and commenced repairs to her rigging. Captain Hope was unable to take immediate possession of his prize as he had no boats available that would "swim". Seeing Endymion hove to, Decatur attempted to escape, making sail at 8.30pm and running downwind. Endymion completed her hasty repairs and got under way at 9.05pm. In the meantime both Pomone and Tenedos were closing on President and by 9.05pm, Pomone had caught up, firing two broadsides at President, after which Decatur once again indicated his surrender. According to British accounts, President had lost 35 men killed and 70 wounded, including Decatur. American sources give their losses as 24 killed and 55 wounded. Endymion had 11 killed and 14 wounded.

Following the arrival of Endymion and the President in Bermuda, Captain Henry Hope was presented with a silver plate in honour of his success. Soon after Hope presented his officers with silver crooks that were probably made from that plate. The design of a crook was a play on the name Endymion, which had been named after a shepherd of Classical legend. These silver crooks have been named as the Midshipman's Badge, however they were given to the Endymion's 24 officers rather than the midshipman. On 15 January 1815 Hope was made a Companion of the Order of the Bath for his role in the capture of President. Endymion and President arrived at Spithead on 28 March 1815. In 1847 the Admiralty authorized the issue to any still surviving crew from Endymion of the Naval General Service Medal with clasp "Endymion wh. President".

== Personal life ==
On 21 July 1828 Hope married Jane Sophia Sawyer, the youngest daughter of Admiral Sir Herbert Sawyer. She died in 1829.

== Later career ==
Henry Hope was named to be an Extra Naval Aide-de-Camp to His Majesty, on 5 September 1831, and he was named to be a Naval Aide-de-Camp to His Majesty on 9 November 1846. He was appointed rear-admiral on 9 November 1846, vice-admiral on 2 April 1853, and admiral on 20 January 1858.
