= HMS Endymion (1797) =

Frigate of the Royal Navy

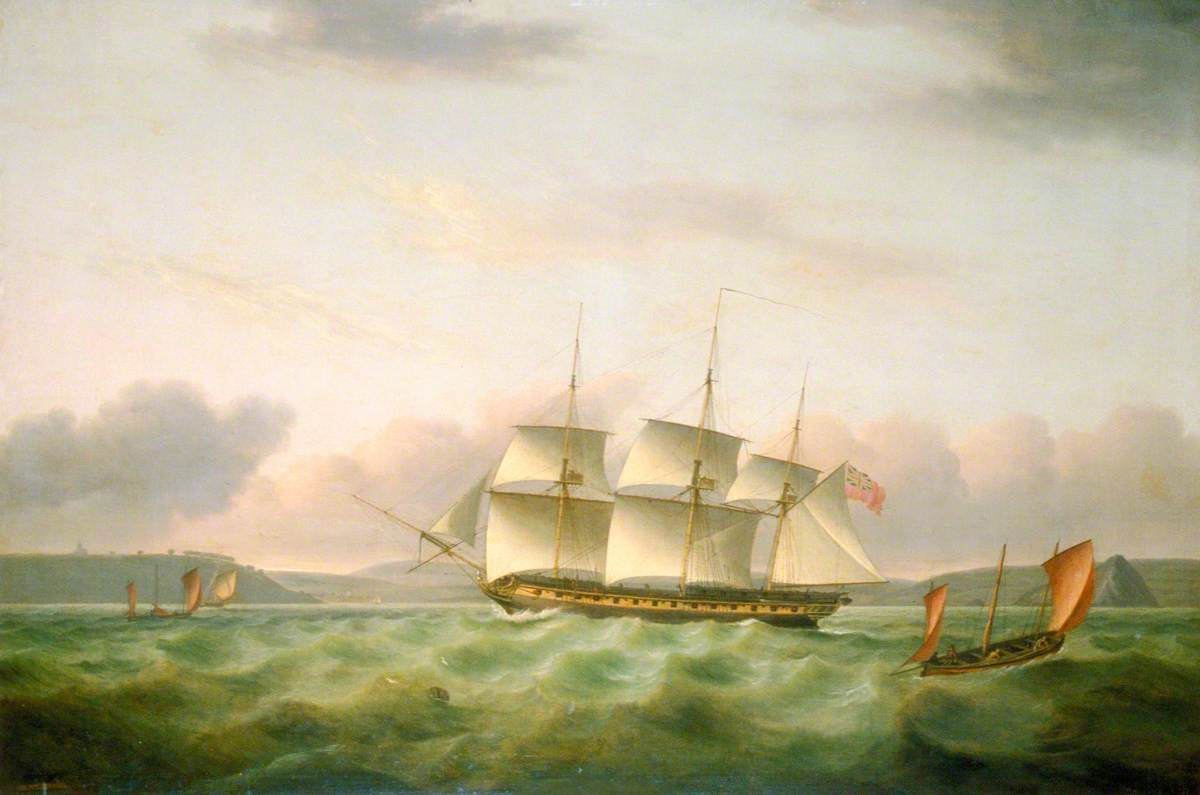
- 1807 painting of Endymion off Great Mewstone

History

Great Britain
- Name: Endymion
- Operator: Royal Navy
- Ordered: 30 April 1795
- Builder: John Randall & Co, Rotherhithe
- Laid down: November 1795
- Launched: 29 March 1797
- Commissioned: 12 June 1797
- Reclassified: Re-rated as 50-gun fourth rate in 1817
- Stricken: 1859, Receiving ship
- Honours and awards: Naval General Service Medal with clasps: "8 April Boat Service 1814", "Endymion wh. President"
- Fate: Broken up in Plymouth, 18 June 1868

General characteristics
- Class & type: Endymion-class frigate
- Tons burthen: 1,277 bm
- Length: 159 ft 3 in (48.5 m)
- Beam: 42 ft 7 in (13.0 m)
- Draught: 15 ft 8 in (4.8 m)
- Propulsion: Sail
- Speed: 14.4 knots (16.6 mph; 26.7 km/h) running; 11 knots (13 mph; 20 km/h) close-hauled
- Complement: 300, increased to 340 during the War of 1812
- Armament: 1797: Upper deck: 26 × 24-pounder guns (11 kg); QD: 6 × 32-pounder (15kg) carronades + 8 × 9-pounder (4kg) long guns; Fc: 2 × 32-pounder (15kg) carronades, + 4 × 9-pounder (4kg) guns; From Nov 1803 to 17 May 1813: Upper deck: 26 × 18-pounders (8 kg); QD:14 × 32-pounder (15 kg) carronades; Fc: 4 × 32-pounder (15kg) carronades, + 2 × 9-pounder (4kg) guns; From 17 May 1813: Upper deck: 26 × 24-pounder guns; QD:16 × 32-pounder (15 kg) carronades; Fc: 1 × 18-pounder (8 kg) brass long gun + 4 × 32-pounder carronades; Additional unofficial armament: Ships boat: 1 × 12-pounder (5kg) gunnade; Fighting Tops: Swivel mounted smaller guns

HMS Endymion was a 40-gun fifth rate that served in the French Revolutionary Wars, the Napoleonic Wars, the War of 1812 and during the First Opium War. She was built to the lines of the French prize Pomone captured in 1794. Due to her exceptional handling and sailing properties, the Severn-class frigates were built to her lines, although the gunports were rearranged to mount an extra pair of guns per side, the ships were made of softwood and were not built until nearly the end of the Napoleonic Wars.

She was famous for her battle with USS President on 15 January 1815, in which she caught the American frigate and crippled her, which led to President's final capture some hours later. Apart from this, Endymion was known as the fastest sailing-ship in the Royal Navy during the Age of Sail, logging 14.4 knots (26.7 km/h) sailing large, and nearly 11.0 knots (20.4 km/h) close-hauled.

Endymion's last active duty came during the First Opium War and included operations on the Yangtze river. She became a receiving ship in 1859 and was broken up in June 1868. Throughout her career, Endymion was praised for her remarkable sailing qualities. She was therefore a highly desirable command for frigate captains. Even in the 1830s, long after her war service, she was regarded as the benchmark for Royal Navy frigates. When in company with much newer ships, she was still capable of outsailing them.

== French Revolutionary Wars ==
In April 1797, Captain Thomas Williams commissioned Endymion for the Channel and Irish station. In October Endymion joined the North Sea fleet with orders to pursue the scattered Dutch ships in the aftermath of the Battle of Camperdown. Within hours, Endymion encountered the ship of the line Brutus close inshore, but the protected anchorage prevented Williams from successfully attacking the Dutch ship and she was able to escape.

For the next three years, Williams was employed off Ireland and on convoy to the island of St Helena. In early 1798 Endymion captured four privateers while cruising off the Irish coast.

- French schooner Revanche, of 12 brass six-pounders and 88 men. She was coppered, and provisioned for a three-month cruise. She had been out 21 days but had taken nothing.
- French privateer lugger Brutus, of six 6-pounders and 50 men. She was provisioned for a two-months cruise, had been out 15 days, and had captured two neutral ships.
- Spanish schooner St. Antonia, pierced for 16 guns but with only six 6-pounders mounted. She was from Havana, and was carrying dispatches from there and elsewhere in South America. Her crew had thrown the dispatches overboard, tied to one of her anchors, but Endymion's boat retrieved them.
- French ship privateer Huit Amis, of twenty 6-pounder guns and 160 men. She was purpose-built for privateering, quite new, and on her first cruise. She was provisioned for a four-month cruise, had been out 20 days, but had taken nothing. The Royal Navy took her into service as HMS Bonetta.

On 5 September 1798, Williams reported capturing or recapturing three vessels:

- Britannia, an "extra ship" sailing from Bengal to London on behalf of the British East India Company. The French privateer Huron had captured Britannia. Endymion was in company with Amaranthe at the time.
- Sophie, a French privateer of 20 guns and 130 men. She had been out 82 days but had captured nothing. Williams described her as "a very fine Ship, quite new, and well adapted for His Majesty's Service, being an extraordinary fast Sailer; she having been chased Eight different Times during her last Cruize by our Ships of War, and each time escaped by superior Sailing." The Royal Navy took Sophie into service as HMS Sophie.
- May Flower, of New York, that had been sailing from Lisbon to London when the French privateer cutter Telemaque had captured her.

In late 1799 to May 1800 Endymion captured a number of French and Spanish privateers.

- Spanish privateer lugger Saint Joseph armed with four long brass six-pounder guns, swivels, and small arms, and carrying 38 men.
- Spanish lugger privateer Intripido, armed with two 6-pounders, swivels, and small arms, and carrying 21 men.
- French letter of marque Paix, armed with ten 6-pounders, and carrying 44 men. She was carrying a cargo from Nantes for Île de France. She had been built as a man-of-war and so was pierced for twenty 9-pounder guns. Williams described her as "quite new, and falls fast."
- Privateer ship Scipio, armed with eighteen brass 9-pounders and carrying a crew of 149 men. She was from Bordeaux, three days out of St. Andero, but had taken nothing. Williams described her as "quite new, very complete, and sails extremely fast." Scipio led Endymion on an "arduous Chace". Finally, then Lieutenant Charles Austen set off in a small boat in a gale with only four other men, and succeeded in boarding and taking possession her; he kept control of Scipio until the following day when Endymion could complete the capture. (Note: His sister, the famed novelist Jane Austen, wrote "Charles has received £30 for his share of the privateer, and expects £10 more; but of what avail is it to take the prizes if he lays out the produce in presents to his sisters? He has been buying gold chains and topaz crosses for us. He must be well scolded.")

In November 1799 Endymion was escorting a convoy of vessels that had come from India via St Helena. A gale came up and dispersed the convoy in the Channel. Endymion reached Plymouth, but the merchantman Bhavani wrecked on the French coast near Boulogne on 12 November. Twenty-four of her crew died, but the rest reached shore. The French took them prisoner, but released them on 10 January 1800.

On 14 February 1800 Endymion and HMS Amazon recaptured Trelawney, which had been sailing from Liverpool to Leghorn when the French privateer Bougainville had captured her. Amazon also captured Bougainville, of eighteen 6-pounder guns and 82 men. Bougainville, of Saint-Malo, had been under the command of Pierre Dupont. Bougainville ran foul of Amazon and foundered, but all but one man of her crew were saved. Amazon, including Bougainville's crew, Endymion, and Trelawney arrived at Portsmouth on 21 February.

Endymion was sailing in company with Champion and a convoy for the Mediterranean when they came upon a heavily laden Portuguese ship from Brazil, totally dismasted and abandoned. The British, after considerable exertion, were able to put her into a navigable state. Champion then towed her into Gibraltar.

In 1801, Williams assumed command of the 74-gun third-rate ship of the line HMS Vanguard. Captain Philip Charles Durham replaced Williams.

== Napoleonic Wars & War of 1812 ==
When war broke out again in 1803, she was part of the blockading squadron off Brest until 1805. During these first years of service, Endymion took a number of French and Spanish prizes, mainly merchants and privateers, but also some warships of up to 20 guns.

On 18 June Endymion and Dragon captured the French "National Corvette" Colombe. She was 40 days out of Martinque, bound for Brest, and had a crew of 65 men under the command of lieutenant de vaisseaux Caro. The Royal Navy took her into service as HMS Colombe.

Seven days later, Endymion captured the French corvette Bacchante, of eighteen 12-pounder guns and 200 men, in the Atlantic after a chase of eight hours. Bacchante, under the command of lieutenant de vaisseau Kerimel was returning to Brest after a three-month voyage to Santo Domingo. Kerimel's attempts to escape resulted in Bacchante losing eight men killed and nine wounded; her return fire caused no casualties on Endymion. Captain Charles Paget described Bacchante as a "remarkably fine Ship, of large Dimensions, quite New, and sails very fast." The Royal Navy took her into service as HMS Bacchante.

In July 1803 Endymion encountered the East Indiaman Culland's Grove, which was returning to Britain after having sailed to Bengal and Benkulen. The officer Paget sent aboard the Indiaman proceeded to press 12 seamen. Culland's Grove's captain and second officer protested vehemently that this would leave them short-handed, but Paget was acting within the law. The Royal Navy was short of men and was in the habit of stopping homecoming merchant vessels and taking some of their best sailors. Paget's position was that the men he took were "surplus company, and that he was authorized to press men out of homeward-bound ships."

In Autumn 1805, Endymion joined the squadron of Rear Admiral Louis off Cádiz, part of Vice Admiral Nelson's fleet, blockading the allied Franco-Spanish force under Admiral Villeneuve. On 2 October, Nelson ordered Louis's five ships of the line with Endymion to Gibraltar for water and provisions; in consequence, Endymion missed the Battle of Trafalgar on 21 October.

In 1807 she took part in the Dardanelles Operation, where she was detached to Constantinople with the British ambassador for negotiations with the Ottoman Empire. The mission was a failure and when the squadron sailed back through the Dardanelles, Turkish shore batteries attacked the British, with Endymion suffering three killed and nine wounded. From 1808 on, Endymion served again in home waters, where she took a number of French privateers.

=== Rockall ===
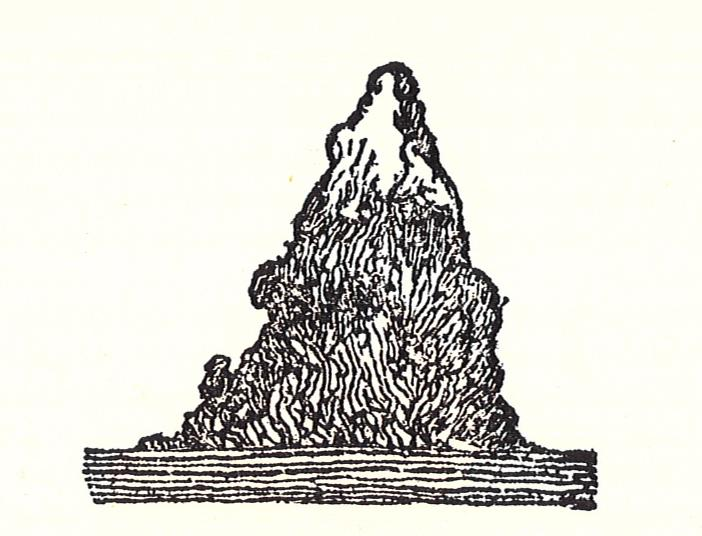
Sketch of Rockall by T. Harvey, in 1810

In August 1810, Endymion, in company with HMS Princess Charlotte, sailed to the then little-known remote islet of Rockall. T. Harvey, her master under Captain Thomas Bladen Capel, plotted its position to 57°39′32″N 13°31′16″W, around 7 miles (11 km) north-east its true position.

John Purdy's Memoir was long accepted for dating the first landing on Rockall as being on this voyage, on 8 July 1810. However, examining Endymion's own logs at the Public Record Office, James Fisher (of the 1955 Rockall landing) discovered that the first landing date was actually Sunday 8 September 1811. Captain Sir William Bolton took command sometime in 1810 through to 9 March 1812. One of her lieutenants during the 1810 voyage was one Basil Hall, who was still with the ship when the 1811 landing was made.

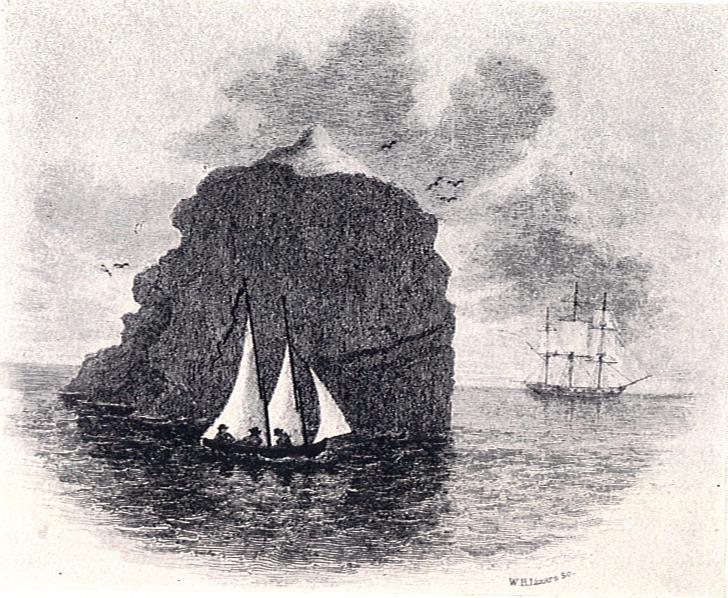
Basil Hall landing on Rockall in 1811

In July 1811 Endymion was again within sight of Rockall and made soundings of the Rockall Bank. By 8 September she had returned and hove to 2 miles (3.2 km) east north east. Dating the landing was again Fisher's detective work, based on Hall's own log. Lieutenant Basil Hall was part of this first landing party upon it, probably under the command of Lieutenant Richard Israel Alleyn, Endymion's First Lieutenant.

The landing appears to have begun most casually. To quote Hall's own book, "As we had nothing better on our hands, it was resolved to make an exploring expedition to visit this little islet. Two boats were accordingly manned for the purpose; ... the artists prepared their sketch books and the geologists their hammers, for a grand scientific field day." Whilst indicating the impromptu nature of the landing, this also signifies that science was a deliberate aim from the first. The sea on this "fine autumnal morning" was unusually smooth, but a swell of many feet made landing difficult and required a great deal of confidence when leaping ashore. Observations and measurements were made until a fog was observed. Concern over the Endymion's continuing visibility caused them to begin their return. The increasing swell made embarking difficult and it took half an hour to gain the boats. By this time Endymion was lost in the fog. One of the party was landed back on the rock, in an attempt to scale it in search of a fog-free look-out. His first view was of an approaching fog bank, which in this area could last for some days. The ship was sighted though, and after another delay to retrieve their "shivering scout" they rowed off in chase. Unfortunately the ship did not see them before the fog returned and they were forced to return yet again to Rockall. At this point planning began for a long stay on the island, despite their lack of provisions or fresh water. It was resolved to abandon the heavier of the two boats and to drag the other ashore to improvise an overnight shelter. Fortunately they were saved by the fog suddenly rising, revealing the ship once more. On finally returning to the ship, some five or six hours after the fog, it was almost dark.

Although Hall wasn't alone in the landing party, and unlikely to have been either its commander or the "shivering scout", he is known for having been the only person to publish a written account of the landing. The 1955 landing party thus named the big ledge near the top, where they erected their flagpole, "Hall's Ledge" after the only named person who was known to have landed in 1811.

On 11 November 1810, Endymion captured the 14-gun privateer Milan.

=== North American station ===
In 1812, the ship underwent a large repair at Plymouth, finally docking out in July 1813. Two further 32-pounder carronades were added to her armament and her complement was increased to 340 men. She was then detached to North America, where she captured some American privateers. Her crew also undertook several boat-attacks to raid American shipping.

Her boats attempted to capture the famous American privateer Prince de Neufchatel, but were unsuccessful. In all, Endymion lost over 100 men killed, wounded, prisoners, or missing, in the attempt. At the time, Prince de Neufchatel was under the command of John Ordronaux, who was also one of her three owners. She was armed with 17-18 guns, almost all 12-pounder carronades, and had a crew of 130 men.

On 6 December 1813 as John and James, Crosby, master, was returning from Chili with 1000 barrels of oil, Pomone captured her and sent her into Bermuda. Pomone shared with Endymion in the prize money for John and James. (Note: A first-class share was worth £288 3s 6d; a sixth-class share, that of an ordinary seaman, was worth £2 6s 6¾d.) On 1 January 1814, Endymion captured the American merchant ship Felicity in the Atlantic Ocean, set her afire, and sank her.

On 7 March 1814, Endymion, Belvidera and Rattler captured an American privateer – the 15-gun vessel Mars – with 70 men. From 7–8 April 1814, the boats of Hogue, Endymion, Maidstone and Borer attacked Pettipague point. In 1847 the Admiralty awarded the Naval General Service Medal with clasp "8 Apr Boat Service 1814" to all surviving claimants from the action. In August 1814, together with Armide, Endymion captured the American privateer Herald of 17 guns and 100 men. In late 1814, Endymion joined the blockading-squadron off New York.

In August, Endymion took part in an expedition up the Penobscot River in Maine. The first ships to go were Sylph, Dragon, Endymion, Bacchante, Peruvian, as well as some transports. Bulwark, Tenedos, Rifleman, and Pictou joined on the 31st. On the evening of 31 August, Sylph, Peruvian, and the transport Harmony, accompanied by a boat from Dragon, embarked marines, foot soldiers and a detachment from the Royal Artillery, to move up the Penobscot under the command of Captain Robert Barrie of Dragon. The objective was the American frigate Adams, of twenty-six 18-pounder guns, which had taken refuge some 27 miles up stream at Hampden, Maine. Here Adams had landed her guns and fortified a position on the bank with fifteen 18-pounders commanding the river. Moving up the river took two days, but eventually, after the Battle of Hampden, the British were able to capture the American defenders at Bangor, though not until after the Americans had burnt the Adams. The British also captured 11 other ships and destroyed six. The British lost only one man killed, a sailor from Dragon, and had several soldiers wounded.

HMS Armide, Endymion, and Pique were in company when Armide captured the American privateer Invincible Napoleon on 16 August.

=== Engagement with USS President ===
USS President (left foreground) having surrendered, Endymion (right foreground) is shown without her fore topmast, due to damage she sustained during her duel with the American ship.

On 14 January 1815, USS President under the command of Commodore Stephen Decatur left New York for a mission in the Indian Ocean. She then fell in with the British blockading-squadron, consisting of the razee Majestic (56 guns, Commodore John Hayes) and the frigates Endymion (Captain Henry Hope), Pomone (38 guns, Captain John Richard Lumley) and Tenedos (38 guns, Captain Hyde Parker). Immediately, the British squadron gave chase with Majestic leading. At noon, Endymion, being the much better sailer, overhauled her squadron and left them behind. At 2 pm she gained on the President and took position on the American ship's quarter, shooting into President as she tried to escape. Endymion was able to rake President three times and did considerable damage to her; by contrast, President primarily directed her fire at Endymion's rigging in order to slow her down. Finally at 7:58 pm, President ceased fire and hoisted a light in her rigging, indicating that she had struck. Endymion's foresails had been damaged in the engagement and she hove to for repairs to the rigging (being unable to take possession of her prize due to a lack of boats that would "swim"). Whilst Endymion was engaged in repairs Commodore Stephen Decatur took advantage of the fact and, despite having struck, made off to escape at 8.30 pm; Endymion, still engaged in repairs could not immediately pursue and resumed the chase at 8.52 pm.

At 9.05 pm Pomone and Tenedos came up with the heavily damaged President. Unaware that the enemy had already struck Pomone fired two broadsides into the President, following which Decatur again struck his ship and hailed the British to say that he had surrendered. Shortly afterwards, Captain Lumley of Pomone took possession of President.

According to British accounts, President had lost 35 men killed and 70 wounded, including Decatur. American sources give their losses as 24 killed and 55 wounded. Endymion had 11 killed and 14 wounded. In 1847 the Admiralty authorized the issue to any still surviving crew from Endymion of the Naval General Service Medal with clasp "Endymion wh. President".

There has been a long-running debate over whether Endymion had beaten President, or President had beaten Endymion. Clearly, President could not fight a normal duel such as that which USS Constitution fought with Java. Had Decatur tried to fight Endymion broadside to broadside, he would have had little chance of escaping the other British ships. His only hope was to get rid of Endymion by dismantling her rigging, and in this he failed, striking to Endymion before this could be accomplished, a fact confirmed by Mr Bowie, ship's chaplain of President who confirmed the raising of the light indicating surrender to Endymion. On the other hand, Endymion - as the smaller and weaker ship (see below) - managed to slow down and damage the American frigate, pouring in three raking broadsides that caused heavy casualties and forcing her to strike. Endymion had successfully disabled six guns on President's starboard side by shooting them off their carriages or damaging the gun barrels. A total 10 of the 15 starboard upper deck gunports on President were hit and the gun crew reduced. It was recorded that shot from Endymion had pierced President below the waterline and six feet (1.8 m) of water was found in President's hold when Pomone boarded her. Shot from Endymion was even found inside President's magazine. However, it is also asserted that far from surrendering to Endymion, President had actually disabled Endymion and removed her from the pursuit. Instead President was only forced to surrender when Pomone and Tenedos came up. This uncertainty is of early date, and is reflected in Commodore Decatur's own recorded comments. Decatur made a deposition before the (British) Admiralty Court at St. George's Bermuda, in January 1815. In this it is recorded that when Pomone's boats boarded President, Decatur insisted that his sword be sent to the captain of "the black ship" (Endymion), as he had struck to her alone. However, in his later despatch, primarily for American consumption, he contradicted this statement.

There has also been much discussion about how many of the American casualties were due to Pomone's broadsides. Before Pomone fired her first broadside, President was already shattered with shot holes on the starboard side, the side Endymion had engaged. Pomone engaged the port side, and there was only little damage recorded. (See the external links, for two different descriptions of the fight). In reality there is no debate, since witness testimony from officers on President stated clearly that no casualties were caused, due mainly to poorly aimed broadsides and many American personnel being below decks.

Comparison of force (English measurement methods used for both ships)

	HMS Endymion	USS President
Length (gundeck)	159 ft 3 in (48.54 m)	173 ft 3 in (52.81 m)
Beam	42 ft 7 in (12.98 m)	44 ft 4 in (13.51 m)
Tonnage	1277 tons (bm)	1533 tons (bm)
Complement	346 men	at least 450 men
Armament	26 × 24-pounder, 20 × 32-pounder carronades 1 × 18-pounder	32 × 24-pounder 20 × 42-pounder carronades 1 × 24-pounder howitzer
Broadside weight	641 lb (291 kg)	816 lb (370 kg)

== Post 1815 ==
After the War of 1812, Endymion was kept in ordinary until 1833. From 1840 to 1842, she served in the fleet commanded by Sir William Parker in the First Anglo-Chinese War (1839–42), known popularly as the First Opium War, including operations on the Yangtze river. On 8 December 1846, she rescued eight crew of USS Somers, which was wrecked off Vera Cruz, Mexico whilst blockading that port. In 1859, she became a receiving ship in Plymouth, and was finally broken up in June 1868.

== Commanding officers ==
The captains of Endymion were:-

- 1797 Captain Sir Thomas Williams
- 1801 Captain Philip Charles Durham
- 1803 Captain Hon. Charles Paget
- 1805 Captain Edward Durnford King
- 1806 Captain Thomas Bladen Capel
- 1810 Captain Sir William Bolton
- 1813 Captain Henry Hope
- 1833 Captain Sir Samuel Roberts
- 1840 Captain Hon. Frederick Grey
- 1845 Captain George Lambert
