= HMS Muros (1806) =

History

France
- Builder: Bordeaux
- Launched: circa 1804
- Captured: 8 March 1806

United Kingdom
- Name: HMS Muros
- Acquired: 1806 by purchase of a prize
- Fate: Wrecked 24 March 1808

General characteristics
- Tons burthen: 4444/94 (bm)
- Length: Overall:107 ft 11 in (32.9 m); Keel:89 ft 8 7/8 in (27.4 m)
- Beam: 30 ft 6 in (9.3 m)
- Depth of hold: 14 ft 5 3/4 in (4.4 m)
- Complement: Privateer:104; RN:140
- Armament: Privateer:22 × 8-pounder + 8 ×6-pounder guns; RN: Upper deck:2 × 12-pounder guns + 20 × 32-pounder carronades; QD:4 × 12-pounder carronades; Fc:2 × 12-pounder carronades

HMS Muros was the privateer Alcide, launched at Bordeaux in 1804. The British Royal Navy (RN) captured her in 1806 and later commissioned her. She wrecked in March 1808.

== French privateer ==
Alcide may have been built in 1802; she was commissioned in Bordeaux in December 1804 under Pierre Feger.

On 7 June 1805 Alcide captured Hannah, of Greenock, which had been returning to Britain from Newfoundland. On 22 June HMS Espoir recaptured Hannah, which arrived at Plymouth on 9 July. (Note: A first-class share of the salvage money was £101 0s 7½d; a seaman's share was worth 15s 7½d.)

HMS Egyptienne's boats cut out the privateer Alcide from Muros on 8 March 1806 under incessant but ineffective fire from two shore batteries. Alcide was frigate-built and pierced for 34 guns. She was only two years old and when she had last gone to sea had had a complement of 240 men.

== Royal Navy ==
The Royal Navy renamed Alcide Muros as there was already an Alcide in service, though by then she was only a hulk. The Navy classified Muros as a 6th rate post-ship.

Captain Archibald Duff commissioned Muros in March 1807 prior to her undergoing fitting at Plymouth. She sailed for Halifax, Nova Scotia on 12 October 1807.

In January 1807 Muros captured the American brig Express, and sent her to Jamaica. However, on the way the American crew recaptured their vessel from the British prize crew and took her into Campeche City.

== Fate ==
Muros was wrecked in Honda Bay, Cuba on 24 March 1808. Her crew were saved.

Muros had sailed to the West Indies after having escorted a convoy to Halifax. The British had received intelligence that the Spanish were erecting fortifications at Honda Bay and the Navy despatched Muros to attack and ideally to destroy the works. A privateer from Providence, the Tambourine, accompanied Muros. Tambourine sent a man aboard Muros to act as a pilot. As the two vessels approached the bay just before dusk, the pilot gave a warning that was too late and Muros grounded on a sandbank. Efforts to pull her off failed, even after lightening. Water started to come in faster than the pumps could deal with it and she fell over with her gunports under water. Captain Duff decided to abandon her as a wreck. Only one man died, a "French black who fell victim to his inebriety". The court martial blamed the wrecking on the pilot but did not punish him as the pilot had volunteered his services to attack the enemy.
