= Forte-class frigate =

Forte class
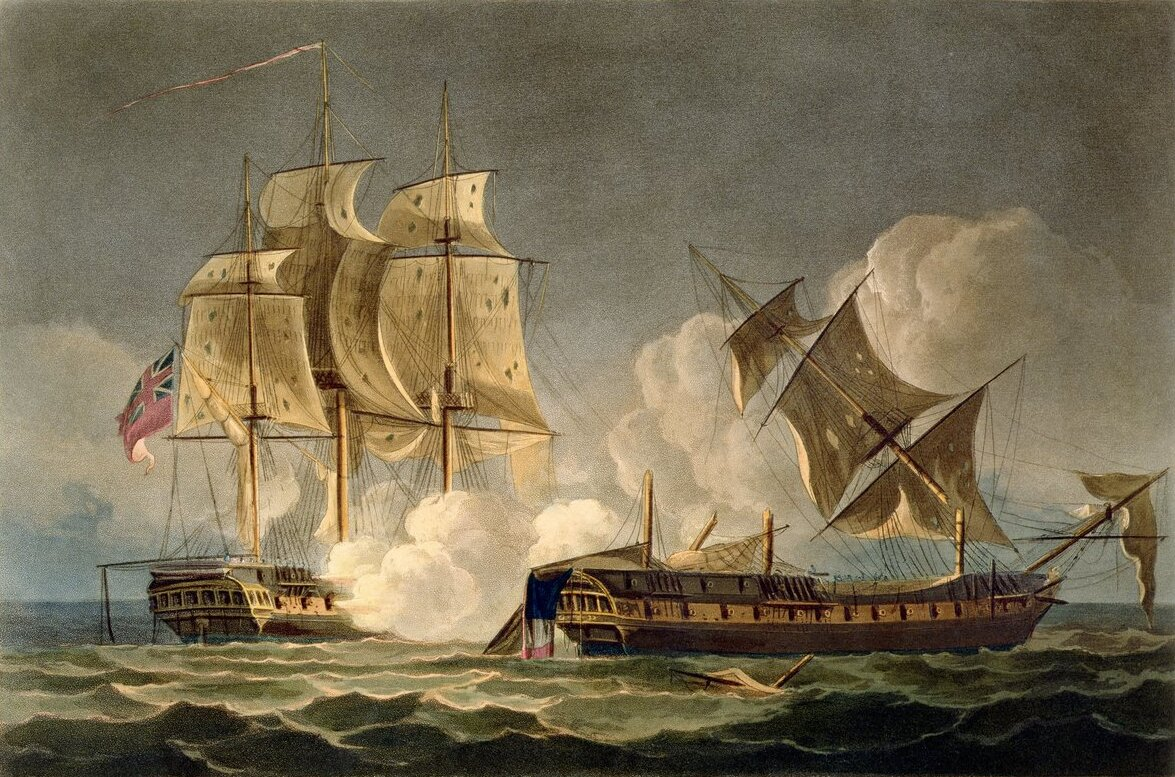
- Forte (right) at the action of 28 February 1799

Class overview
- Name: Forte
- Builders: Lorient, Toulon
- Operators: French Navy; Royal Navy
- Preceded by: Résistance class
- Succeeded by: Romaine class
- Completed: 2

General characteristics
- Type: 50-gun frigate
- Displacement: 2,042 tons displacement
- Tons burthen: 1,012 tons (port measurement)
- Length: 52 m (170 ft 7 in) (gundeck); 48 m (157 ft) (keel)
- Beam: 13 m (42 ft 8 in)
- Draught: 5.85 m (19 ft 2 in)
- Depth of hold: 5.66 m (18 ft 7 in)
- Sail plan: Full-rigged ship
- Armament: 30 × 24-pounder long guns (in the upper deck); 20 × 8-pounder long guns (6 on the forecastle, 14 on the quarterdeck); 4 × 36-pounder carronades

The Forte class was a class of two large frigates of the French Navy, designed in 1794 by François Caro. They carried 30 24-pounder long guns as their main battery and 20 × 8-pdrs on the quarterdeck and forecastle; they were exceptionally large and powerful heavy frigates for their time.

- Forte

Builder: Lorient
Begun: 30 May 1794
Launched: 26 September 1794
Completed: November 1794
Fate: Captured by the British Navy on 1 March 1799, became HMS Forte, wrecked in January 1801 in the Red Sea.

- Égyptienne

Builder: Toulon
Begun: 26 September 1798
Launched: 17 July 1799
Completed: November 1799
Fate: Captured by the British Navy on 2 September 1801, became HMS Egyptienne, sold for breaking up 30 April 1817

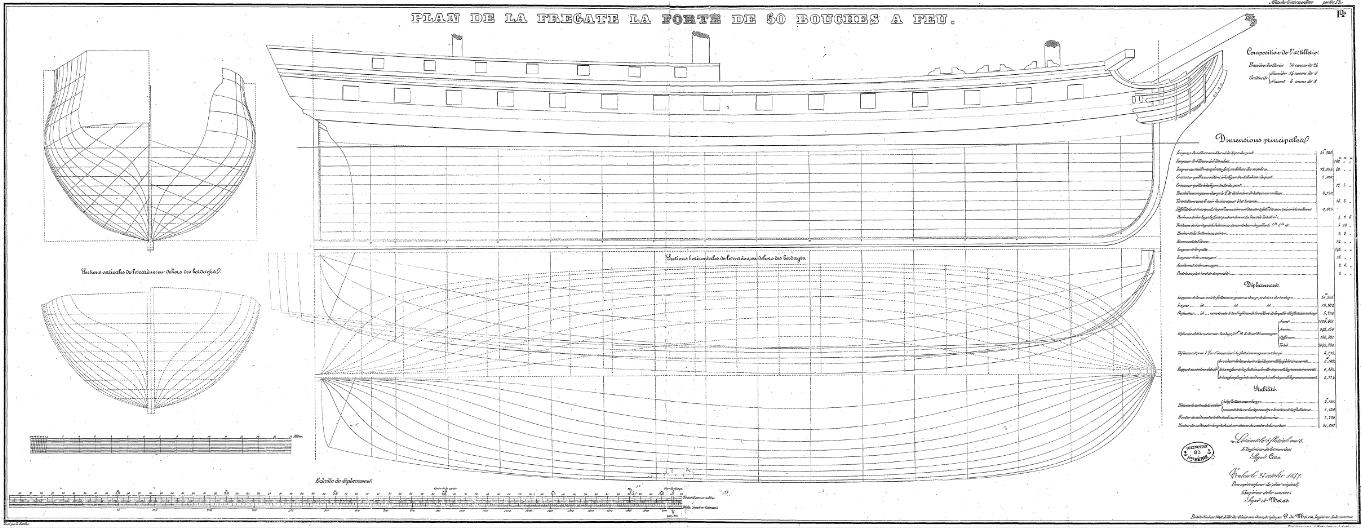
Plans of the hull of Forte
