= Harry Hope (disambiguation) =

Harry Hope was a Scottish politician.

Harry Hope may also refer to:

- Harry Hope, Australian DJ who performs under the alias Odd Mob
- Harry Hope, character in The Iceman Cometh
- Harry Hope, character in Doomsday Machine (film)

== See also ==
- Henry Hope (disambiguation)
