= Bhavani (1797 ship) =

History

Great Britain
- Name: Bhavani
- Namesake: Bhavani
- Builder: Calcutta
- Launched: 1797
- Fate: Wrecked 12 November 1799

General characteristics
- Type: Full-rigged ship
- Tons burthen: 650 (bm)
- Propulsion: Sail

Bhavani, also known as Bhavanie (Hindi: भवानी, بھوانی), was a ship launched at Calcutta in 1797. She was under the command of Captain John Carse when she was wrecked on 12 November 1799, on the coast of France 3 miles (4.8 km) east of Boulogne-sur-Mer in a gale during a voyage from Calcutta to London. On 6 December 1799, Lloyds List reported that "The Bhavanie, Carse, from Bengal to London, is lost near Boulogne." The War of the Second Coalition was raging at the time, and the French took her officers and crew prisoner.

Bhavani was part of a convoy under the escort of the Royal Navy frigate HMS Endymion at the time she was wrecked. French forts had initially fired on Bhavani but ceased when it became clear that she was a merchantman in distress. Twenty-four of her crew died, most of whom were Europeans; the rest were lascars. The French were solicitous of the survivors and took them to Valenciennes. The survivors left France on 10 January 1800, and arrived at London in the night of 12 January 1800.

She may have been carrying cargo on behalf of the British East India Company.

== Bibliography ==
- Hackman, Rowan (2001). Ships of the East India Company. Gravesend, Kent: World Ship Society. ISBN 0-905617-96-7.
- Hardy, Charles (1800). A Register of Ships, Employed in the Service of the Hon. the United East India Company, from the Union of the Two Companies, in 1707, to the Year 1760: Specifying the Number of Voyages, Tonnage, Commanders, and Stations. To which is Added, from the Latter Period to the Present Time, the Managing Owners, Principal Officers, Surgeons, and Pursers; with the Dates of Their Sailing and Arrival: Also, an Appendix, Containing Many Particulars, Interesting to Those Concerned in the East India Commerce. Charles Hardy.
- Phipps, John, (of the Master Attendant's Office, Calcutta) (1840). A Collection of Papers Relative to Ship Building in India ...: Also a Register Comprehending All the Ships ... Built in India to the Present Time ... Scott.
