= HMS Espoir (1804) =

Brig-sloop of the Royal Navy

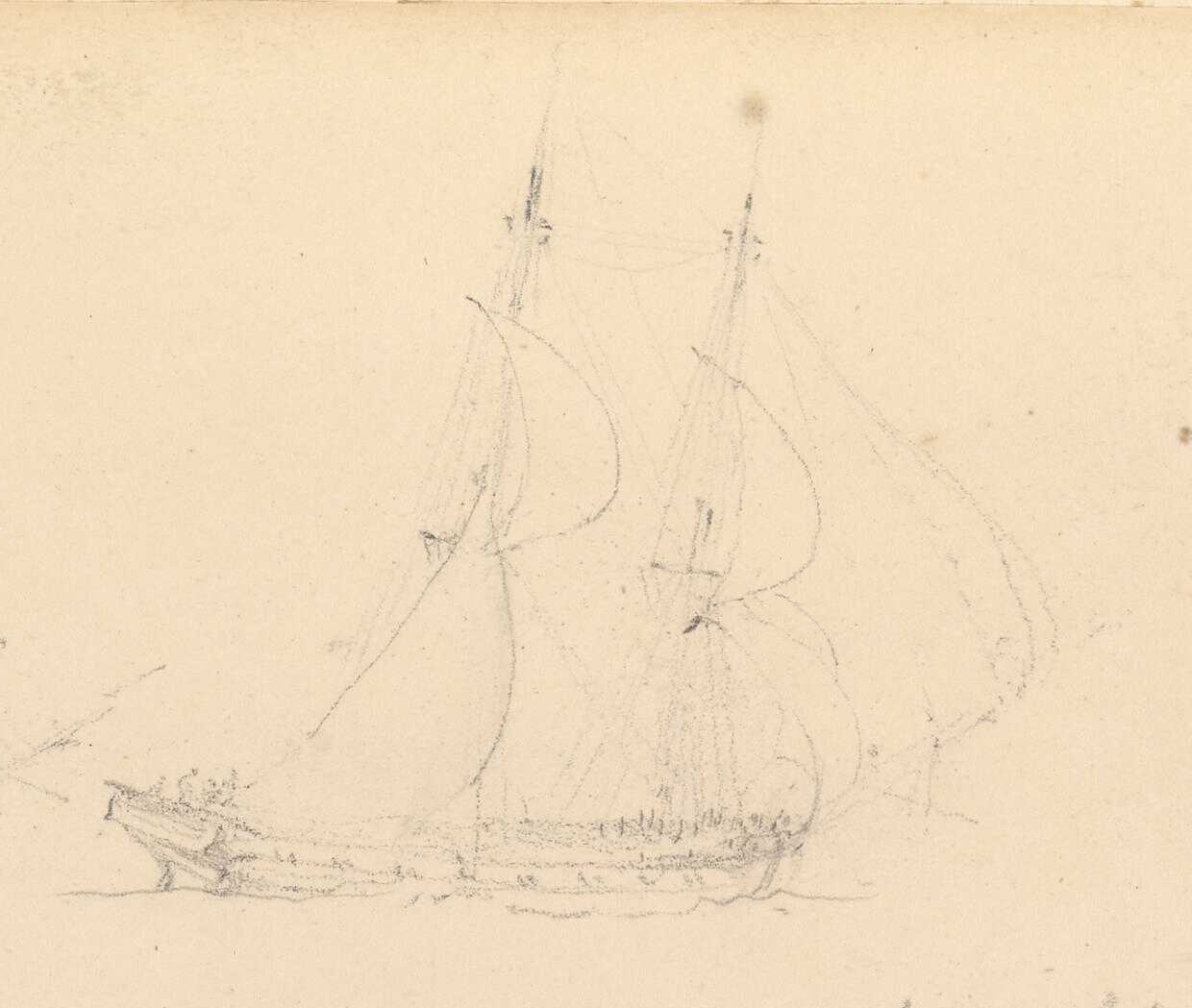
- Espoir going into Portsmouth harbour, sketched by John Christian Schetky 1813

History

United Kingdom
- Name: HMS Espoir
- Ordered: 7 November 1803
- Builder: John King, Dover
- Laid down: February 1804
- Launched: 22 September 1804
- Commissioned: October 1804
- Out of service: Paid off in October 1816
- Fate: Broken up 1821

General characteristics
- Type: Cruizer-class brig-sloop
- Tons burthen: 385 (bm)
- Length: 100 ft 1 1/2 in (30.5 m) (gundeck); 77 ft 6 in (23.6 m) (keel)
- Beam: 30 ft 7 in (9.3 m)
- Depth of hold: 12 ft 9 in (3.9 m)
- Sail plan: Brig rigged
- Complement: 121
- Armament: 16 × 32-pounder carronades + 2 × 6-pounder bow guns

HMS Espoir was a Cruizer-class brig-sloop of the Royal Navy, launched in 1804. She served during the Napoleonic Wars, primarily in the Mediterranean, and then briefly on the North American station. She was broken up in April 1821.

== Career ==
Commander Joseph Edmonds commissioned Espoir in October 1804. On 22 June 1805 she recaptured Hannah. Hannah, of Greenock, had been returning to Britain when the privateer Alcide, of Bordeaux, had captured her on 7 June. Hannah arrived at Plymouth on 9 July. (Note: Edmond's share of the salvage money was £101 0s 7½d; a seaman's share was worth 15s 7½d.)

In the autumn of 1805 Espoir was part of Commodore Home Popham and General Sir David Baird's expedition to capture the Cape of Good Hope. The fleet sailed to Madeira and San Salvador. On 5 October Edmonds transferred to command Diomede and Home Popham transferred Lieutenant William King, first lieutenant on Diadem, to (acting) command of Espoir. The fleet reached Robben Island on 4 January 1806. On 5 January Home Popham used Espoir to conduct a reconnaissance of the coast to attempt to find an alternate landing place for the troops than Saldanha Bay. The reconnaissance was unfruitful and the next day Espoir supported the landing there. Commander Henry Hope replaced King later that month, with King assuming command of Diadem. (Note: The Admiralty disapproved Home Popham's rapid promotion of King and he did not receive promotion to commander until 13 October 1807.)

Because Espoir was part of the squadron, she shared in the proceeds of the vessels the expedition captured, which included the French frigate Volontaire. The Royal Navy took Volontaire into service under her existing name.

Espoir returned to Britain and on 12 April captured the Prussian brig Charlotte Sophia. (Note: A first-class share of the prize money was worth £80 0s 6d; a fifth-class share was worth 17s 4¾d.)

By June 1807 Espoir was in Britain, fitting out for the Mediterranean. She sailed for the Mediterranean on the 29th.

On 24 April 1808 Hope received a promotion to post captain. Two days later Admiral Lord Collingwood, Commander-in-Chief Mediterranean Fleet, appointed Lieutenant Henry Higgs, Espoir's first lieutenant, as her captain (acting).

In 1809 Commander Robert Mitford superseded Higgs. Espoir came under the command of Rear Admiral George Martin, who was in command of British naval forces on the Naples station.

On 26 May Milazzo Admiral Martin in HMS Canopus (1798), was gathering a fleet at Milazzo. The whole force, including Canopus, Spartiate, Warrior, Cyane, and Espoir, together with transports and the like, some 133 vessels in all, sailed from there on 11 June to the coast of Calabria. On 15 June, Alceste, two Sicilian frigates, and some 90 or so transports from Palermo joined them. The aim of the expedition was to attack the islands of Ischia and Procida.

On 20 June Cyane sailed south with Espoir and 12 Sicilian gunboats to patrol between Procida and Cape Miseno. Their assignment was to intercept French reinforcements attempting to reach the islands.

At daylight on 26 June, the British spotted 47 enemy vessels and Martin sent Cyane, Espoir, and a flotilla of gunboats to block them from entering the harbour at Naples. They were able to capture 18 heavy gunboats, destroy four, and dispose of 15 other armed vessels, forcing the remainder to turn away. In all, Cyane and her Anglo-Sicilian force cost the French 37 vessels.

The next day Cyane and Espoir were in company when Cyane engaged the French 42-gun frigate (Cérès), the 28-gun corvette (Fama), and French gunboats for one and a half hours before having to break off the fight as she was running out of powder and both Cyane and Cérès were getting too close to the mole at Naples. (Fama took the opportunity to escape to Naples.) Cyane bore the entire brunt of the action, with Espoir too far away to assist.

Espoir and Success were off Castiglone on 4 April 1810 when they observed three vessels being loaded on the beach. Success sent in two boats and Espoir sent in one, all three of which were swamped on a sunken reef about a musket-shot offshore. (Two seamen from Espoir drowned, and later a marine was killed.) Because the swamping had wet all their ammunition, the British swam to the beach with cutlasses in their mouths. There they drove off the enemy, who were firing on them with two long 6-pounders and four wall guns. The British spiked the guns, set fire to two vessels on the shore, and stove in the barrels holding their cargoes of oil. The landing party retrieved the swamped boats, with great difficulty, and returned aboard. In all five British sailors and marines died in the attack.

Within a few days, Espoir and Success destroyed two sloops, each of 60 tons, in the Bay of Naples. One, Santa Rosa, was carrying a cargo of grass rope; the other was carrying herring.

On 25 April 1810 Spartan, Success and Espoir discovered four square-rigged vessels and a number of feluccas anchored under a castle at Terracino. Espoir went in to take soundings before the frigates closed and commenced a cannonade. Then the boats of the squadron boarded and brought out a ship of six guns, whose crew defended her strongly, and three barks. British casualties consisted of one man killed and two wounded.

In 1812 Espoir was part of a light squadron in the Archipelago. The squadron's objective was two-fold: maintain the then existing good relations between Great Britain and the Sublime Porte, and protect British commercial interests (trade) in the area.

Mitford received promotion to post captain on 31 March 1813, and Higgs again assumed the role of acting captain between 14 April and 7 July 1813. Commander the Honourable Sir Robert Cavendish Spencer then assumed command. Under Spencer Espoir participated in the attack on 8 August on Cassis. The attack resulted in the destruction of five shore batteries, and the capture of destruction of three gunboats and 25 merchant vessels.

On 18 August, a landing party from Espoir, the frigate Undaunted, and Redwing stormed shore batteries at Cassis and captured three pinnaces and 83 men.

On 19 January 1814 Spencer transferred to Carron. Commander Robert Russell replaced Spencer. Commander Norwich Duff replaced Russell and under his command Espoir took part in operations against Washington, Baltimore, and New Orleans.

Between 21 and 26 August 1814, Espoir captured three American sloops (Pilot, Mary Ann, and one with an indecipherable name) and two American schooners (William and Hornet). These captures occurred while Espoir participated in Admiral Alexander Cochrane's expedition in the Patuxent River, at Fort Washington, and Alexandria, between 22 and 29 August. (Note: A first-class share was worth £183 9s 1¾d; a sixth-class share, that of an ordinary seaman, was worth £1 9s 3½d. A second and final payment came in May 1819. A first-class share was worth £42 13s 10¾d; a sixth-class share was worth 9s 1¾d.) Espoir shared in the proceeds of goods landed from transport ship Abeona, surgeon's necessaries, schooners Franklin and Saucy Jack, and flour, captured between 21 October and 6 November.

On 2 June 1815, the Bulwark, as flag ship, with the Admiral's tender, and Espoir, arrived at Halifax, 6 days after departing from Bermuda.

She departed Halifax on 28 August 1816, then arrived at Portsmouth on 19 September 1816. Sir James Cockburn, Governor of Bermuda was a passenger on the voyage.

== Fate ==
Espoir was paid off in October 1816. She was broken up at Portsmouth in April 1821.
