= Great Republic (1853 clipper) =

American clipper

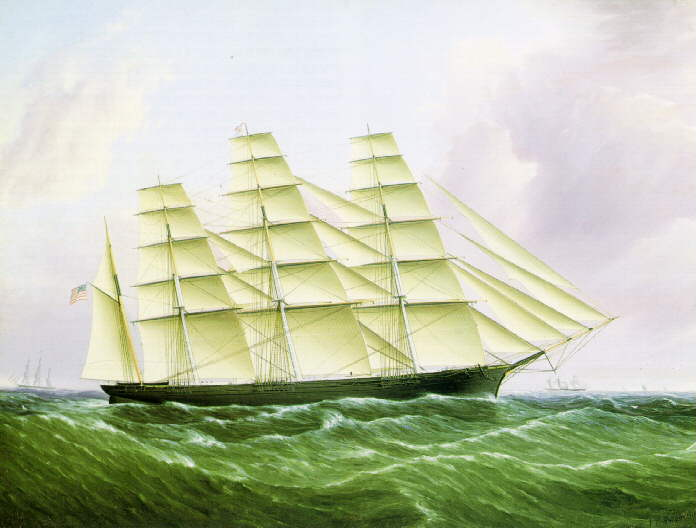
- Clipper barque Great Republic, painting by James E. Buttersworth

History

United States
- Name: Great Republic
- Namesake: Poem by Henry Wadsworth Longfellow
- Owner: Donald McKay (Boston, 1853); A. A. Low & Brothers (New York 1854); Capt. J. S. Hatfield (Yarmouth, N. Scotia) 1866; Merchant's Trading Company (Liverpool 1869)
- Ordered: 1852
- Builder: Donald McKay (designer & builder)
- Cost: $ 450,000.00 (1853)
- Laid down: 1852
- Launched: October 4, 1853
- Christened: October 4, 1853 by Capt. A. Gifford
- Maiden voyage: February 24, 1855 to Liverpool, England
- In service: 1854
- Out of service: 1872
- Renamed: Denmark in 1869
- Home port: Boston (1853); New York (1855); Yarmouth, Nova Scotia (1866), Liverpool (1868)
- Identification: Code letters L 2 T 5
- Fate: Sunk in storm off Bermuda on March 5, 1872
- Badge: figurehead: gilded eagle and a second gilded eagle with outstretched wings across the stern board

General characteristics
- Class & type: four-masted medium Clipper barque; three-masted full-rigged ship from 1862
- Tonnage: 4,555 GRT, 4,100 NRT; 3,357 GRT, 3,100 NRT, from 1855
- Displacement: ~6,600 tons (5,000 tons cargo plus 1,600 tons ship's mass)
- Length: 334 ft (102 m); 400 ft (122 m) over all length
- Beam: 53 ft (16 m)
- Height: 247 ft (75 m) keel to masthead truck, 216 ft (66 m) deck to masthead truck (original measures)
- Draught: 25 ft (7.6 m)
- Decks: 4 continuous wooden decks, after rebuilt: 3 (with additional poop and forecastle decks)
- Deck clearance: 8 ft
- Propulsion: Sails
- Sail plan: Original plan: 50 sails (6,400 m²): 17 square, 10 stay sails, 5 jibs, spanker & spanker top sail, 16 studding sails; Reduced sail plan: 42 sails (5,400 m²): 15 square, 8 stay sails, 5 jibs, spanker & spanker top sail, 12 studding sails; sail area (full-rigged ship): 29 sails (5,200 m²): 18 square, 5 stay sails, 5 jibs, 1 spanker sail, 12 studding sails
- Speed: 19 kn (35.2 km/h)
- Capacity: 5,000 tons max.
- Complement: 60; originally planned: 120

When launched in 1853, Great Republic was the largest wooden ship in the world. She shared this title with another American-built ship, the steamship Adriatic. She was also the largest full-rigged ship ever built in the United States. She was built by Donald McKay for trade on his own account to Australia.

Just as she was completing loading in New York for her first commercial trip, she was involved in a disastrous fire. She was scuttled to try to save the hull, with only limited success. McKay decided to abandon the wreck to his insurers, who sold the damaged hull to new owners, who rebuilt her with three decks instead of four. She was employed on trans-Atlantic and California routes, with a period under contract to the French government for the Crimean War. She was never used on Australian routes.

Even in her rebuilt form, Great Republic had difficulty accessing many ports when fully loaded, due to her great size. She regularly had to partially unload into lighters so that she could then enter locked basins to finish unloading. She did make the fast passages expected of her by McKay – so vindicating the design concept.

== Construction ==
Great Republic, as originally built in 1853

Designed by naval architect and shipbuilder Donald McKay as a four-deck four-masted medium clipper barque, Great Republic—at 4,555 tons registry—was intended to be the most profitable wooden sailing ship ever to ply the Australian gold rush and southern oceans merchant trade. The ship's launch was planned for September 4, 1853—builder Donald McKay's birthday—but it was postponed to October 4 due to problems with the timber supplies. The City of Boston made the launch a public holiday. Between 30,000 and 50,000 spectators attended, among them Ferdinand Laeisz of the Flying P-Line of Hamburg. The ship was christened by Captain Alden Gifford using a bottle of pure Cochituate water. The ship's name was drawn from the title of a poem by Henry Wadsworth Longfellow. After outfitting, Great Republic sailed in ballast from Boston to New York, where in December 1853 her first cargo was loaded.

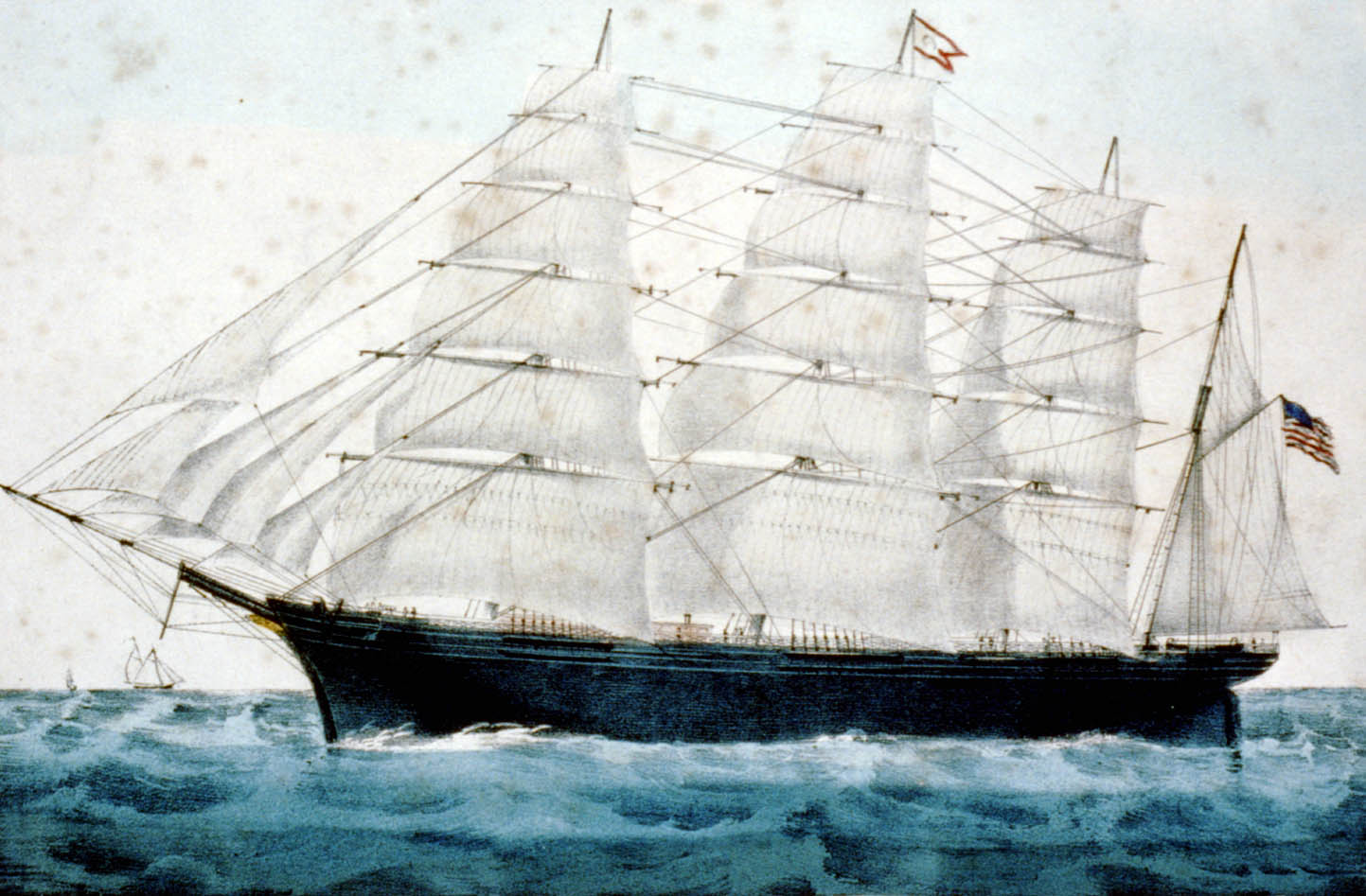
Currier and Ives print of Great Republic

Great Republic (sailing ship), c. 1865,

Great Republic required "1,500,000 feet of pine ... 2,056 tons of white oak, 336½ tons of iron, and 56 tons of copper" - about three times as much pine as was typically required for a large clipper ship.

The Essex Institute Historical Collections provide a very detailed description of Great Republic in Volume LXIII, published in 1927.

== Fire and re-building ==
On December 26, 1853 a fire broke out in the buildings of the Novelty Baking Company on Front Street near the piers where Great Republic and several other wooden merchant vessels were moored. The fire quickly spread to the packet ship Joseph Walker, and to the clippers White Squall, Whirlwind, and Red Rover, with sparks from the fire showering onto the deck of the Great Republic, whose crew was mustered shortly after midnight to unsuccessfully dowse the sails. The first three ships were destroyed; Red Rover was damaged, and Great Republic burnt to near the waterline and was scuttled at dawn to save her hull at dock. Bloated by grain which burst her seams, Great Republic was declared a total loss, and Donald McKay, who was said never to have gotten over the tragic event, was compensated by insurers. The sunken hulk was sold by the insurance underwriters to Captain Nathaniel Palmer, working on behalf of A. A. Low and Bro., who salvaged and rebuilt it as a three-deck vessel with reduced masts.

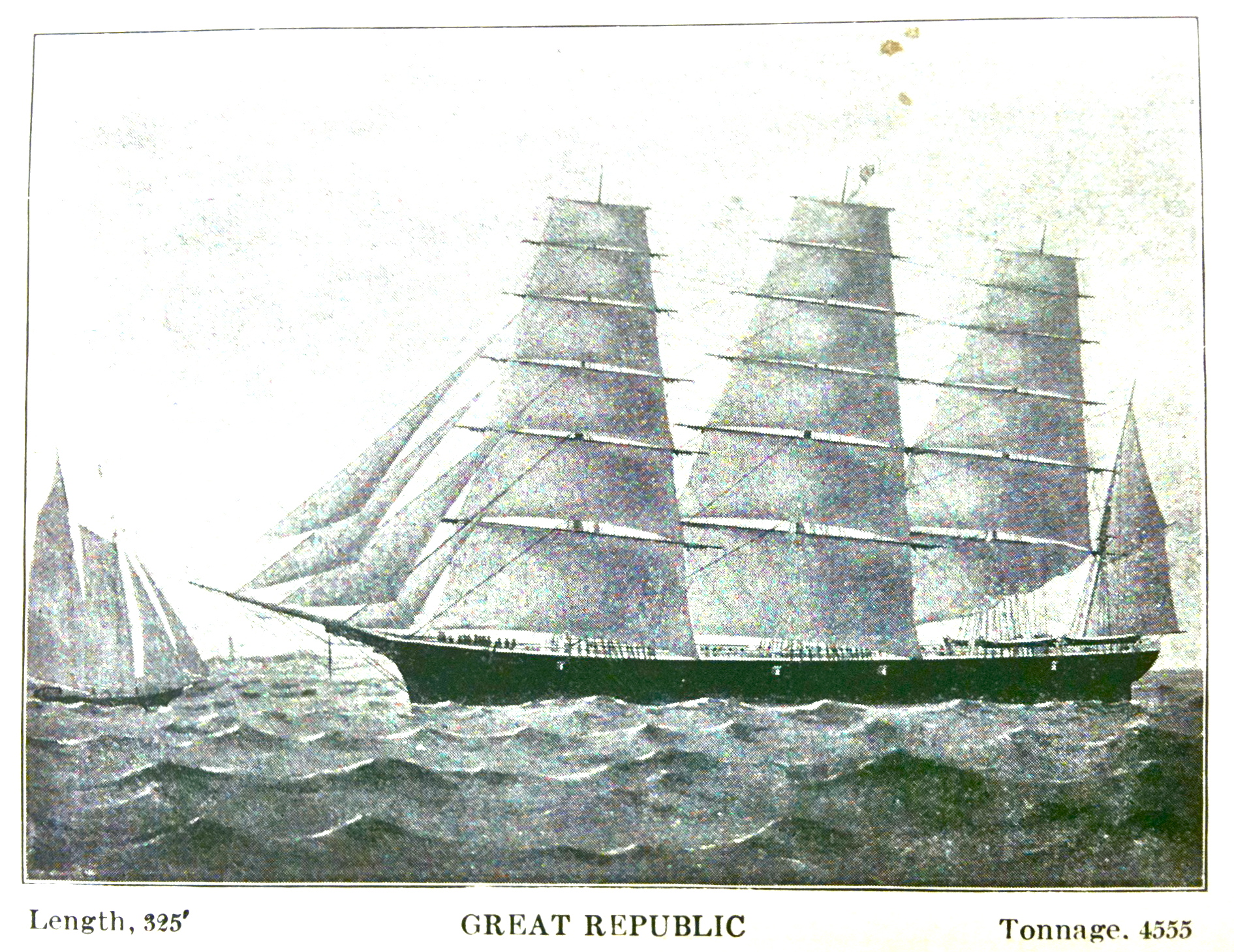

== Voyages ==
Still the largest clipper ship in the world at 3,357 tons registry, Great Republic, under command of Captain Joseph Lymburner, started back in merchant service on February 24, 1855. Her maiden voyage brought her to Liverpool in 13 days.

Great Republic was "chartered by the French Government to bring munitions and troops to the Crimea," and served in the general cargo and guano trades. In 1862 the fourth mast was removed and the others re-rigged, and the clipper became a three-masted full-rigged ship, a so-called three-skysail-yarder. In 1864 Captain Lymburner retired and the ship's registry moved to Yarmouth, Nova Scotia. In 1869 she was sold to the Merchants' Trading Company of Liverpool and renamed Denmark. She continued sailing until March 5, 1872, when a hurricane off Bermuda caused the ship to leak badly and she was abandoned.

== Records set ==
During her 19-year merchant career, Great Republic proved to be very fast under leading breeze conditions and often out-distanced the fastest merchant steamers on Mediterranean routes. Sailing around Cape Horn, Great Republic averaged 17 knots (31 km/h) to set a record by logging 413 nautical miles (765 km) in a single day.

== Comparison to other large wooden sailing ships ==
A wooden sailing vessel larger than Great Republic was launched nearly three decades earlier in June 1825: the 5,294-ton Baron of Renfrew was a disposable ship built for a single voyage from Quebec to London. There it would be dismantled and sold piecemeal to English shipbuilders at premium prices since large timbers were in short supply. The vessel itself was exempt from British taxes imposed on "oak and square pine timber cargoes" and thus gained an economic advantage. Unfortunately, Baron of Renfrew was wrecked as it was being towed toward London in a storm. Although reports differ, most indicate the timbers were recovered and sold, and the venture was ultimately successful. Nevertheless, when the British tax on timber cargoes was changed shortly afterwards, the economic advantage disappeared and disposable ship construction ceased.

Great Republic was the largest, but not the longest wooden sailing ship ever built. Despite her 400 ft length overall, the record of being the longest wooden ship is held by the six-masted schooner Wyoming built at the Percy & Small shipyard, Bath, Maine, in 1909. Her overall length including her 86 ft (26 m)-long jibboom and her protruding spanker boom was 450 ft (140 m), 334 ft (102 m) on deck.

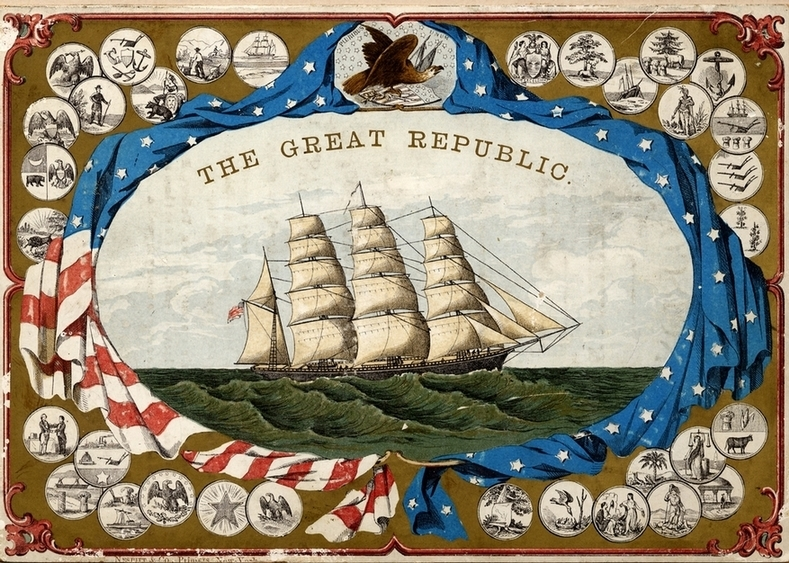
Sailing card
