= French ship Sophie (1790) =

History

France
- Name: Sophie
- Builder: Nantes
- Launched: 1790

Great Britain
- Name: HMS Sophie
- Acquired: September 1798 by capture
- Fate: Broken up June 1809

General characteristics
- Displacement: 500 tons (French)
- Tons burthen: 38838/94 (bm)
- Length: Overall: 108 ft 8 in (33.1 m); Keel: 37 ft 3 7/8 in (11.4 m)
- Beam: 28 ft 11 in (8.8 m)
- Depth of hold: 13 ft 11 1/2 in (4.3 m)
- Complement: French service:148; 130 at capture; British service:121
- Armament: French service: 20 × 8-pounder guns; British service: 16 × 24-pounder carronades + 2 × 6-pounder chase guns

The French ship Sophie was a slave vessel launched at Nantes in May 1790. Her owners commissioned her there as a privateer in 1793, after the outbreak of the French Revolutionary Wars. The French Navy, desperate for escort vessels, requisitioned her on 21 April 1794. In May 1795, the French Navy returned the ship to her owners for use as a privateer. HMS Endymion captured her off the Irish Coast in September 1798. (Note: Some British sources state that Sophie had been renamed Premier Consul, or that HMS Sophie had been Premier Consul. This is incorrect. Sophie was never Premier Consul as General Napoleon did not appoint himself Premier Consul/First Consul until 1799. The only letter in the London Gazette mentioning the capture of a Premier Consul was by HMS Dryad in 1801. It appears that a clerk in the Navy Records Office made a careless mistake.) The Royal Navy took Sophie into service. She then served in the North Sea, Baltic, Mediterranean, and East Indies until she was broken up in 1809.

== Capture ==
When Endymion captured Sophie in September 1798, Sophie had been out 82 days, but had taken nothing. She was armed with 22 guns and had a crew of 130 men. Captain Thomas Williams, of Endymion, described Sophie as:

... a very fine Ship, quite new, and well adapted for His Majesty's Service, being an extraordinary fast Sailer; she having been chased Eight different Times during her last Cruize by our Ships of War, and each time escaped by superior Sailing.

== HMS Sophie ==
Endymion brought Sophie and two merchant prizes into Spithead on 5 September 1798. She arrived at Portsmouth on 12 September 1798, but was not fitted there until July–September 1799. The Royal Navy took her into service as HMS Sophie, registering and establishing her on 5 October 1798.

Commander George Burdett commissioned Sophie in September 1799. On 3 December, she returned to Portsmouth from a cruise to Bilbao. On 9 May 1800, she convoyed transports from Portsmouth to Guernsey. nO 22 July, Sophie arrived at Portsmouth with the navy transports Sea Nymph, Howard, Huddleton, and Diligence, which she had convoyed from Ireland.

In 1801, she was on the Newfoundland station.

In April 1802, Commander Philip Lewis Rosenhagen took command for the Downs station, and then the North Sea. He recommissioned her in April 1803. Sophie shared with Penelope, Fortunee, and Ambuscade in the capture of the Twee Gebroeders, Post, master. However, the proceeds were only £38 17s and were to be shared with over 800 men. The prize agents therefore bought 17/16 lottery tickets. Unfortunately, there was no announcement of the proceeds of the lottery tickets.

In July 1802, Sophie was sailing to and from Jersey. At the end of the month she and several other naval vessels sailed there to convoy transports that were taking Dutch troops from Jersey to Cuxhaven. she returned to Portsmouth from Cuxhaven on 2 September.

Between 8 August and 14 September 1803, and perhaps longer, Sophie maintained a blockade on the Weser river.

Sophie then shared with the same three vessels in the proceeds of the capture on 11 August of the Vyf Gebroeders, Lintz, master; Vier Gesusters, Hacrna, master; Jonge Jan, Dick, master; Jonge Rocloss, Groot, master; and Vrow Sevantye, Janiz, master. On 27 August, Clyde detained the Hendrick and Jan. Fortunee; Penelope, Ambuscade, Sophie, and Beaver were in company.

In 1804, Sophie transferred to the Gibraltar station and the Mediterranean. By February, she was convoying transports between Gibraltar and Lisbon. On 19 March, Lord Nelson wrote to Rosenhagen, ordering him to take a "most secret" letter to "Rendezvous 97, under Cape Sebastians" where he was to deliver it to the captain of Juno.

On 17 January 1805, Sophie captured the Greek ship San Nicholai. She shared the prize money with Fisgard and Beaver, Beaver sharing by agreement with Sophie.

On 6 May, Sophie captured Dolphin. Then, on 5 July, Sophie captured the Spanish zebec Francisco de Assis (or St Francis d'Assis). Alcyon was in company.

In March 1806, Commander William Mansell replaced Rosenhagen. Sophie sailed to the East Indies in 1808.

== Fate ==
The "Principal Officers and Commissioners of His Majesty's Navy" offered the sloops "Sophie, Echo, and Cerf, lying at Deptford" for sale on 12 January 1809. Sophie docked at Deptford on 29 June, 1809, to be broken up.
