= Prince de Neufchatel =

American privateer brig (1813–14)

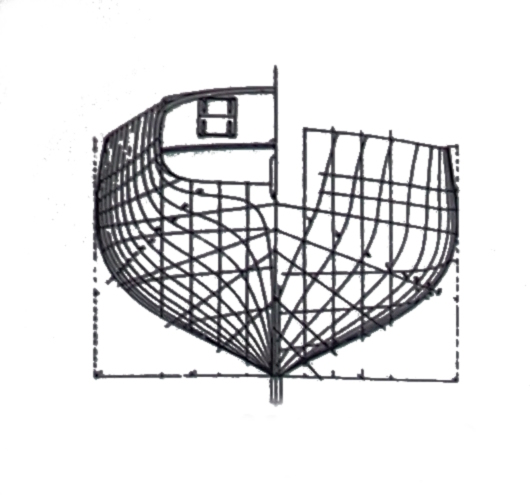
- Body Plan of Prince de Neufchatel, as recorded by her British captors in 1814.

History

United States
- Name: Prince de Neufchatel
- Builder: Adam and Noah Brown
- Launched: 1813
- Fate: Captured, December 1814; broken up 1815

General characteristics
- Tons burthen: 32822/94 (bm)
- Length: 110 ft 8 in (33.7 m) (overall); 93 ft 8 1/4 in (28.6 m) (keel)
- Beam: 25 ft 8 in (7.8 m)
- Depth of hold: 11 ft 6 in (3.5 m)
- Armament: Privateer: 18 guns*; British service: 16 × 12-pounder carronades + 2 × 6-pounder bow chasers

Prince de Neufchatel was a fast sailing United States schooner-rigged privateer, built in New York by Adam and Noah Brown circa 1812. She is a fine example of the peak of development of the armed schooner. During the War of 1812, Neufchatel operated mainly in European waters, preying on British merchant shipping. Noted for her speed, at one time she outran seventeen men-of-war. In 1813, operating in the English Channel, she took nine British prizes in quick succession. On 11 October 1814, Prince de Neufchatel repelled a cutting-out party from HMS Endymion that attempted to capture her. The British finally captured her in December 1814; she was broken up in 1815.

== Construction ==
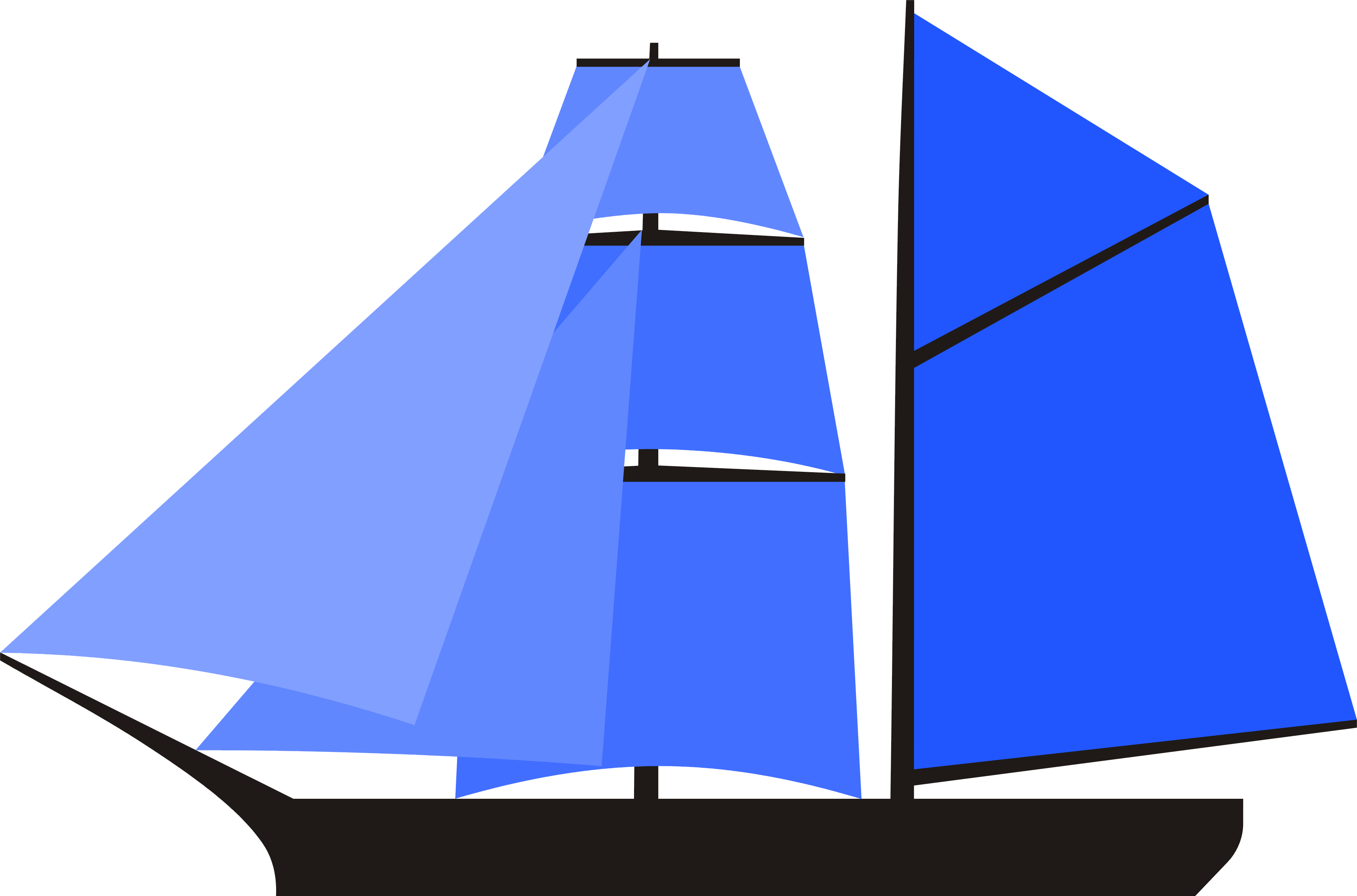
A hermaphrodite brig design

Her design is believed to be due to Christian Bergh. She had a hermaphrodite rig, i.e., she combined the rigs of a schooner and a brigantine. "She carried four sails on the foremast, one square sail on the main, and a large fore-and-aft sail with gaff abaft the fore, with large staysails over and three jibs. Her spanker boom projected far beyond the stern."( Prince of Neuchatel)

After her capture, her design caught the Navy Board's interest and on 10 April 1815, it ordered Woolwich Dock to build a copy. However, with the end of the War of 1812 and the Napoleonic Wars, the copy was never built.

== Career ==
On 11 October 1814, under Captain John Ordronaux, Prince de Neufchatel engaged in one of the most violent privateer clashes of the war. Becalmed on the south side of Nantucket, she became vulnerable. Captain Henry Hope of HMS Endymion thereupon sent 111 men in five boats to cut out Prince de Neufchatel, defended by 40 Americans. After 20 minutes of savage fighting, Prince de Neufchatel succeeded in driving off the cutting-out party. British casualties amounted to 28 killed, 37 wounded, and 28 taken prisoner. The Americans reported seven killed and 24 wounded. Ordronaux put most of the wounded and prisoners off at Nantucket, and "limped into Boston".

On 28 December 1814, in the Atlantic, three British frigates, Acasta, Leander, and Newcastle, sighted Prince de Neufchatel and began a pursuit. Under the strain of her large sail area, her masts sprung (cracked; many Baltimore clippers experienced problems due to their extremely large rigs). Unable to outrun the British frigates, Prince de Neufchatel surrendered. John Ordronaux was apparently not her captain at the time; her commander was Nicholas Millin. At the time of her capture, Prince de Neufchatel was armed with 18 guns and had a crew of 129 men. She was eight days out of Boston. (Note: A first-class share of the prize money, that of a captain, was £108 7s 1d; a sixth-class share, that of an ordinary seaman or marine, was 12s 9 3/4d.)

== Fate ==
The British took Prince de Neufchatel back to England. There she was damaged beyond repair on the back of the sill of a dock gate as she was being undocked. As a result, she was never commissioned into the Royal Navy. She was broken up in 1815.

== Legacy ==
The clipper Red Rover, built in 1830, was modeled after Prince de Neufchatel.

Artist Roy Cross painted a 24 in (610 mm) by 36 in (910 mm) oil on canvas of Prince de Neufchatel. The painting is in a private collection.
