= Henry Hope (Quebec lieutenant governor) =

British soldier and colonial administrator

Henry Hope (c. 1746 – 13 April 1789) was a soldier and a colonial administrator in the Province of Quebec (1763–1791). Genealogy references sometimes call him Henry Hope-Vere, but he does not appear to have been called this by his contemporaries.

== Biography ==
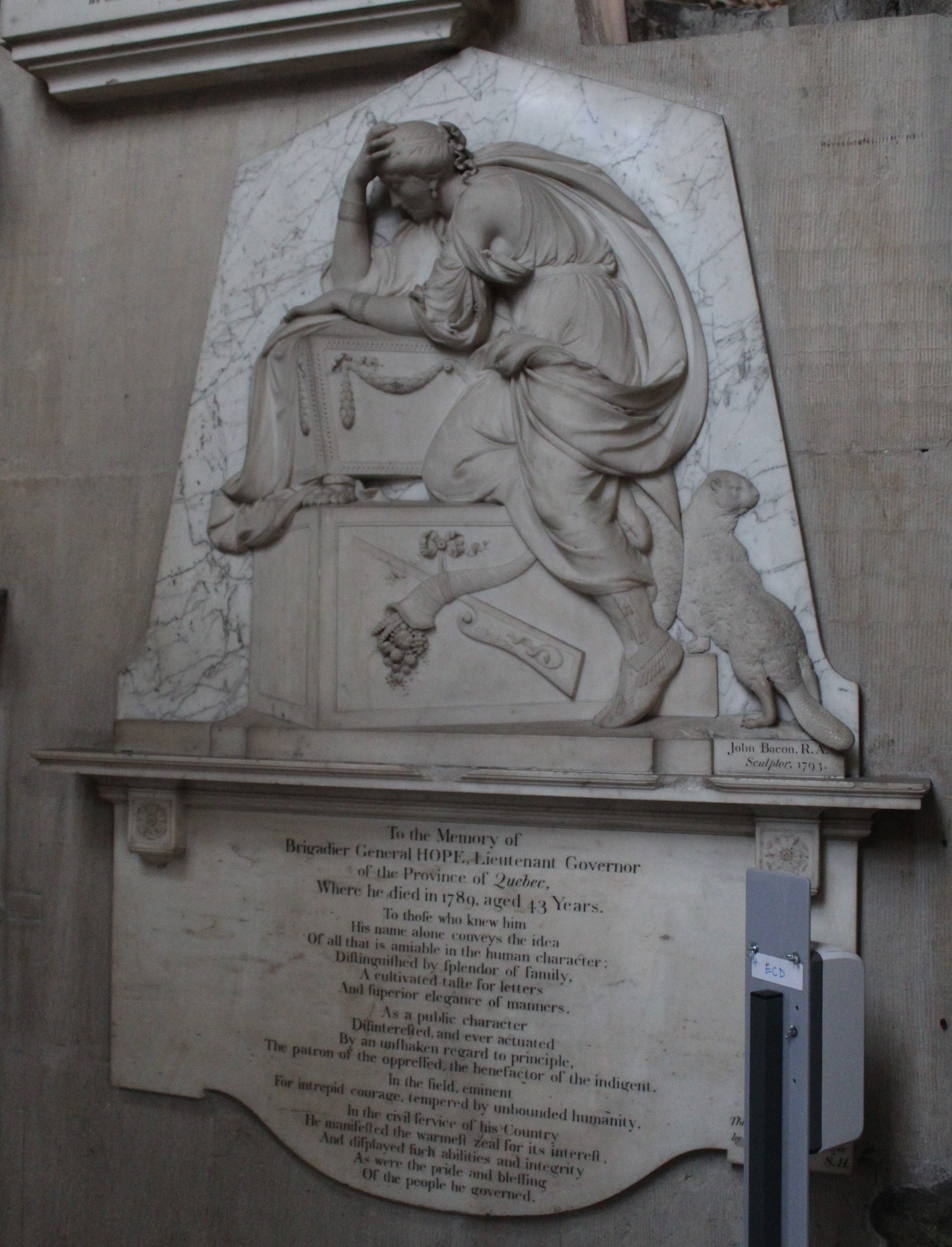
Hope's memorial in Westminster Abbey

Hope was most likely born in Scotland, the son of Charles Hope-Weir (or Hope-Vere) by his second wife Lady Anne Vane, and the grandson of Charles Hope, 1st Earl of Hopetoun. He entered the Army in 1764 as a captain in the 27th Foot. In 1775, the 27th sailed to Boston to fight in the American Revolutionary War, and soon after their arrival, Hope was promoted to major in the 44th Foot soon after arriving. In October 1777, following the death of Brigadier-General Agnew at the Battle of Germantown, Hope was promoted to lieutenant-colonel in the 44th; in 1782 he was again promoted to colonel; and in 1784 to brigadier-general.

He was a lieutenant governor of the Province of Quebec from 1785 to 1788 during the second term of Guy Carleton (Lord Dorchester) as governor. In those days, the "lieutenant governor" simply was the deputy of the governor; there is no connection to the modern-day Lieutenant Governor of Quebec.

The town of Port Hope, Ontario derives its name from him, as do the township municipality of Hope, Quebec and the municipality of Hope Town, Quebec.

Through his brother Charles, he was the uncle of his namesake Henry Hope, a Royal Navy officer.

He has a monument in the north transept of Westminster Abbey, by the sculptor John Bacon.

He married Sarah Jones of Mullaghbrack; there were no children. The fact that he predeceased his father gave rise to the case "Graham against Hope" in the Court of Session of Scotland, over the question of whether his widow's sister's daughter was entitled to the legacy bequeathed by his father.
