= USS Ordronaux =

Benson-class destroyer

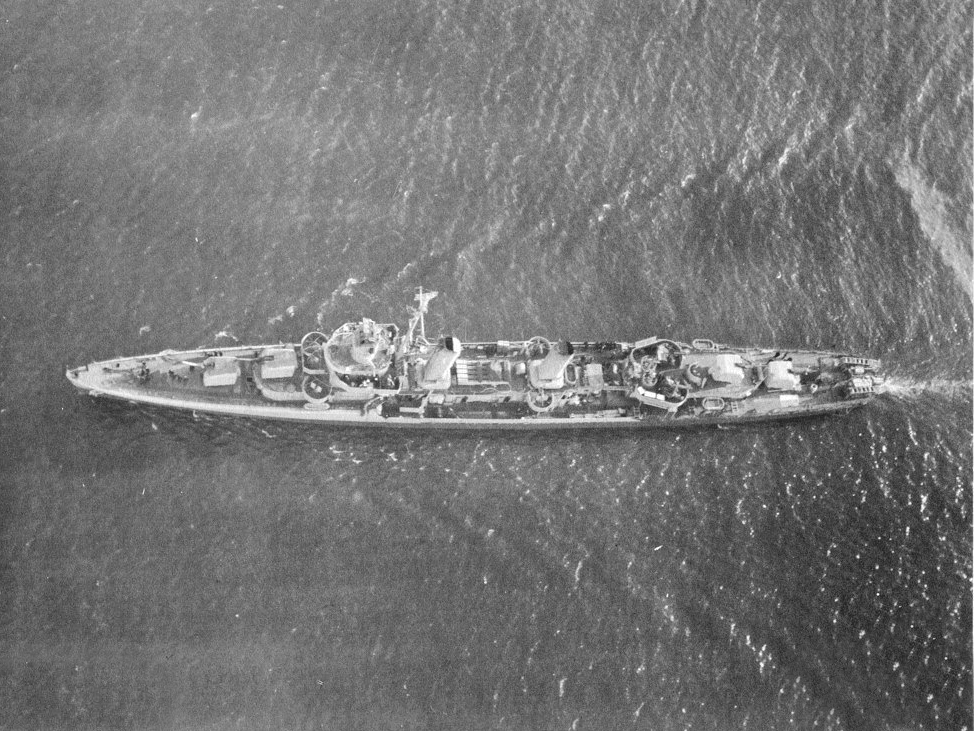
- USS Ordronaux (DD-617) underway off Boston, Massachusetts, on 28 February 1943

History

United States
- Name: USS Ordronaux (DD-617)
- Namesake: John Ordronaux
- Builder: Fore River Shipyard
- Laid down: 25 July 1942
- Launched: 9 November 1942
- Commissioned: 13 February 1943
- Decommissioned: 27 March 1946
- Stricken: 1 July 1971
- Fate: Scrapped in 1973

General characteristics
- Class & type: Benson-class destroyer
- Displacement: 1,620 tons
- Length: 348 ft (106 m)
- Beam: 36 ft (11 m)
- Draught: 13 ft 4 in (4.06 m)
- Speed: 37.6 knots (69.6 km/h)
- Complement: 276
- Armament: 4 × 5 in (130 mm)/38 guns, 4 × 40 mm, 5 × 21" (533 mm) tt.

USS Ordronaux (DD–617) was a Benson-class destroyer in the United States Navy during World War II. She was named for John Ordronaux, the 19th-century privateersman.

Ordronaux was laid down 25 July 1942 by the Bethlehem Steel Corporation, Fore River, Massachusetts; launched 9 November 1942; sponsored by Mrs. J. Henry Judik; and commissioned 13 February 1943.

== Service history ==
After shakedown, Ordronaux departed New York 1 May 1943 en route to Mers-El-Kebir, Algeria, escorting Convoy UGS.4. Her first encounter with the enemy came on 6 July, while at anchor at Bizerte Naval Base. Attacked by German planes, she helped down several.

=== Mediterranean theater ===
In the invasion of Sicily 9 July, Ordronaux was assigned a squadron of torpedo boats to patrol the harbor of Porto Empedocle and force out German E boats and Italian MAS boats, so they could be destroyed. She screened allied ships from Axis submarines and rendered fire support for the invasion until the 21st.

For nearly a year, following the invasion, Ordronaux sailed back and forth across the Atlantic and through the Mediterranean Sea on convoy duty.

=== North Atlantic theater ===
On 7 April 1944, while operating with a hunter-killer task unit composed of DDs and DEs, Ordronaux spotted a German submarine U-856 south of Nova Scotia. USS Champlin made first contact by sounding and with USS Huse made several depth charge attacks, forcing the submarine to surface. Both ships opened fire, and Champlin rammed the sub. Nields and Ordronaux captured 28 survivors.

=== Return to the Mediterranean ===
On 12 May, Ordronaux was back in the Mediterranean with MacKenzie screening Dido while the British cruiser bombarded Terracina and Gaeta on the west coast of Italy in support of the U. S. 5th Army, which was advancing on Rome. For the rest of the month, Ordronaux operated with Dido and Émile Bertin supporting the beachhead at Anzio.

=== Southern France ===
On 9 August, Ordronaux was attached to a fire support force for the invasion of southern France. On the 15th, she operated within 3000 yards of the beach providing "call fire" for Navy liaison officers and Army spotters. Many times she was straddled with 88 min projectiles from enemy shore batteries.

After the invasion of southern France, she returned to convoy duty. On 1 May 1945, after returning to New York for alterations, Ordronaux sailed for the Pacific, via the Panama Canal. On 24 July she arrived in Pearl Harbor and sailed immediately for Wake Island. There on 1 August, Ordronaux conducted close fire support, meeting accurate counter-fire.

=== Pacific theater ===
Ordronaux arrived at Okinawa several days before Japan capitulated. After the surrender, she took part in two occupation landings—at Wakayama and at Nagoya. She made several cruises to ports in Honshū, including two to Tokyo Bay, before sailing for the United States 31 October.

=== Post war ===
Returning to the East Coast, she was assigned local operations off Charleston, South Carolina until she was placed out of commission in reserve January 1947, and attached to the Charleston group of the Atlantic Reserve Fleet. She was later berthed at Orange, Texas. She was struck from the Naval Vessel Register on 1 July 1971 and scrapped in 1973.

== Awards ==
Ordronaux earned three battle stars for service in World War II.

== Notable crew ==
- Tommy Byrne, World War II Gunnery Officer, MLB Pitcher Won 85 Lost 69
