= John Ordronaux (privateer) =

French-born privateer and businessman (1778–1841)

- Born: December 16, 1778; Nantes, Brittany
- Died: August 24, 1841 (aged 62); Cartagena, Colombia
- Occupation: Privateer
- Piratical career
- Type: Privateer
- Allegiance: France; United States
- Commands: Marengo; Prince de Neufchatel
- Battles: War of 1812
- Wealth: $300,000
- Later work: Sugar industry

John Ordronaux (born Jean Ordronaux; December 16, 1778 – August 24, 1841) was a French-born privateer and businessman. Born in Nantes, Brittany, he eventually moved to the United States. During the War of 1812, Ordronaux captained two ships, Marengo and Prince de Neufchatel, and conducted several privateering cruises with both vessels. He captured or burnt approximately 30 British merchantmen and seized a total volume of goods worth between $250,000 and $300,000 during the war. Following the end of the conflict in 1815, Ordronaux settled in New York City in 1816 and married, having five children, including a son named John. After allegedly working in the sugar industry, he died at Cartagena, Colombia, South America in 1841.

== Early life ==
Jean Ordronaux was born on December 16, 1778 at Nantes, Brittany. His father was a French sea captain who was also named Jean and his mother was an Englishwoman from Hull named Joanna Hammond. Ordronaux eventually moved to the United States and anglicized his given name to John. During the outbreak of the War of 1812 on 18 June 1812, he commanded the privateer Marengo which had been outfitted in New York City in November 1811. His patron was a French lady called Florye Charretton, who was allegedly a Parisian woman of considerable wealth.

=== Captured seamen landed at Fayal, Azores ===
On 23 June 1812 Marengo was in New London, Connecticut and being shadowed by the 36-gun frigate HMS Belvidera (Captain Richard Byron). However Belvidera was sighted and chased away by USS President and her squadron (Captain John Rodgers) allowing Marengo to capture the British brigantine Lady Sherbroke from Halifax, Nova Scotia. This prize was sent into New York on 10 August 1812. Marengo then went on to take the brigantines Eliza (Captain Sullivan) of Guernsey, and Lady Provost (Captain Jennings) of Halifax, Nova Scotia. This document suggests that Ordronaux was a gentleman and that he treated his prisoners of war sympathetically. It describes him handing over eighteen named prisoners to the British consul at Fayal in the Azores Islands on 17 August 1812. The prisoners included two masters and three mates and an exchange was made for the same number of American prisoners of war. Jacques Bidois is named as the commander of Marengo in this document but he is thought to have been Ordronaux's mate at this time. In mid October 1812, Bidois is listed as master of Marengo in a book which also records her as having only six guns and a crew of fifty men. So her three captured prizes must have seemed a considerable success.

=== Captured passenger landed in Grand Canary boosted the island's economy ===
On 29 August 1812 Marengo captured the British brigantine Concord (Captain Taylor) between Tenerife and Fuerteventura according to Lloyd's List Marine Collection. Some captured passengers from Concord were landed on the island of Grand Canary after being relieved of their money. Amongst these was the 14-year-old Scotsman from Cockburnspath, James Swanston Miller (1798-1855), who went on to found the famous mercantile houses of Swanston and Miller in the island. After being taken in and given a job by a French merchant called Francisco Gourié, he learnt the business of import/export and progressed to starting his own business, Swanston & Co., in 1820. In 1824 his cousin Thomas Miller Swanston (1805-1885) joined him in the business. The business was renamed Thomas Miller & Co. when James Swanston Miller retired to Scotland, a rich man, in about 1846. The Miller dynasty remained in the islands for four generations during which time they established many companies including a bank, general store, insurance company and car dealership at Calle de Triana, 46, and the shipping agency Miller y Cia., S.A. on the Muelle de Santa Catalina. They were also responsible, with their Swanston cousins, for building the beginnings of the modern port of Las Palmas (the Puerto de La Luz) between 1883 and 1903. With others, they also built the Santa Catalina Hotel, the English Church and established the British cemetery and other institutions. James Miller (1839-1915) and his brother Joseph Miller (1840-1920) were awarded the Spanish decoration of Caballo de la Real Orden de Isabel la Catolica for their contribution to the development of the island's economy by constructing the Port and its facilities, the Santa Catalina Hotel and for supporting Spanish institutions such as the Chamber of Commerce. Thomas Miller's son James Miller (1839-1915) and grandson Gerald Miller (1889-1982) both became honorary British vice-consuls, and both entertained royalty and other vip's in the island, including the British Prime Minister, Harold MacMillan in 1960.

=== Rescue of stranded passengers thwarted by US Navy ===
It is possible that the Royal Navy made an attempt to rescue James Swanston Miller and his fellow captured passengers with the 38-gun frigate, HMS Macedonian. This ship had been ordered to escort an East Indiaman to Madeira and then hunt for prizes. She left Madeira to carry out this latter order on 22 October. News of the recent visit of Marengo to Fayal in the Azores, or of the capture of Concord near the Canary Islands, is likely to have reached Madeira by that time, because the news reached Lloyd's of London on 24 October. This means that the news is likely to have reached the atlantic islands about three weeks earlier. Such news would have been likely to entice Macedonian to give chase. However, only a few days later, on 25 October, Macedonian was dismasted and captured by the much larger 44-gun heavy American frigate, USS United States. So if this was a rescue attempt it failed almost before it began.

After departing from Grand Canary in August 1812, Concord was taken to New York to auction as a prize Captain Taylor said in court evidence that he was allowed to mess with Marengo's officers on this trans-Atlantic voyage providing further evidence that her crew acted in a gentlemanly way to her prisoners. On arrival in New York the neutral Spanish owners of part of Concord's cargo of wine (destined for delivery to James Miller, merchant in Fuerteventura) sued Florye Charretton and Ordronaux for the loss of their property and the 190 or so pages of court documents that have survived in the US archives provide much information about the effect of privateering on mercantile trade in this period. Because of his involvement in this litigation and in arranging for the sale by auction of his prizes and their cargoes, Ordronaux was inactive as a privateer for approximately the next twelve months. The sale of Concord alone raised the sum of $24,409. This was shared between her owners and each named member of her crew in proportions given in the surviving court documents. But most significantly, Ordronaux now had sufficient funds to buy a ship of his own.

== Second command: Prince de Neufchatel ==
The response of the British to the successes of the small, early American privateers was to defend their ships more heavily. So during 1813 a number of ship builders on the East coast of the US built larger, faster, more heavily armed privateering vessels. Now enriched by his prize winnings and supported by his patron, Mme Charretton, Ordronaux purchased one of this new breed of ships, the Prince de Neufchatel, which was constructed in New York between 1812 and 1813 by the firm of Adam and Noah Brown to a design attributed to Christian Bergh. On 28 October 1813, he took command of the Prince de Neufchatel, and showing considerable skill, sailed her to Cherbourg virtually unarmed, arriving there on 27 January 1814 for fitting out. Showing further panache, Ordronaux managed to capture his next prize Hazard (Captain John Anderson) on 18 January, before his ship was properly fitted out.

After fitting out and arming with eighteen guns (compared to Marengo's six) Ordronaux undertook his first cruise from Cherbourg into the English Channel in early March 1814. Incurring the fury of Lloyd's List Ordronaux captured six British vessels sending the valuable ones into French ports and burning the rest, despite constant harassment by the Royal Navy ships HMS Achille and HMS Sybille.

Ordronaux's next cruise was his most successful taking him along the coast of Portugal and back to the English Channel from July 1814. On returning to Baltimore, USA in October 1814 the Baltimore Patriot of the 24th of that month printed an extract of Ordronaux's log which showed that he had captured no less than twenty prizes since July.

=== Battle with HMS Endymion ===
Ordronaux's most famous accomplishment took place in the fall of 1814. The Prince de Neufchatel was making her first privateering cruise out of a U.S. port with a very small crew of 33 men. Four days out of Boston, she captured the British merchantmen Douglass and took it under tow. On 11 October, and with Douglass still under tow, Prince de Neufchatel met the British 40 gun frigate HMS Endymion off the southeastern tip of Martha's Vineyard. Of this battle, Captain Henry Hope of the HMS Endymion said, "the extraordinary feature of this affair lies in the fact that a vessel fitted out at private expense actually frustrated the utmost endeavours of an English frigate, of vastly superior force in guns and men, to capture the privateer. We lost as many men in our efforts to seize the Prince de Neufchâtel as we would have done had my ship engaged a regular man-or-war of equal force. The people in the privateer conducted their defence in the most heroic and skilful manner."

== Capture of Prince de Neufchatel ==
Prince de Neufchatel was eventually captured by the British frigate HMS Leander on 28 December 1814, having brought to the United States goods worth between $250,000 and $300,000, and having escaped 17 Royal Navy ships. The vessel's Letter of Marque (from the US Government), Registry Certificate and Muster Roll were found on board and are now held by the UK National Archives. These name Ordronaux as one of the owners and Captain Nicholas Millin as master of the vessel since 12 December 1814. These records suggest that Ordronaux was not on board when Prince de Neufchatel was captured, and cannot be held responsible for its loss. Other documents in the UK National Archives relate to the interrogation of Benjamin Wells, a sailmaker on Prince, the consideration of the British Admiralty to take Prince into service with the Royal Navy, details of the sale of Prince as a prize, the captain's log of HMS Leander, and the "Head Money" papers of Prince de Neufchatel.

== Late life and death ==
After the war, and now a rich man, Ordronaux settled in New York City in 1816 and married Jean Marie Elizabeth Charretton the daughter of his former patron. They had four daughters, all of whom married, and an unmarried son, John. After allegedly enjoying a second career in the sugar industry, he died at Cartagena, Colombia, South America in 1841. His body, while being transported home, is thought to have been thrown overboard by superstitious sailors when their ship nearly sank in a storm. In honor of the man, the World War II U.S. warship, USS Ordronaux (DD-617), was named after him.
