= John Ordronaux (doctor) =

American physician

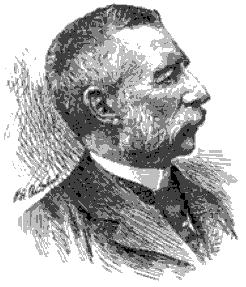
- Born: August 3, 1830; New York City, United States
- Died: January 20, 1908 (aged 77); Roslyn, New York, United States
- Education: Dartmouth College; Harvard Law School; National Medical School
- Occupations: U.S. Army surgeon, Professor of medical jurisprudence, mental health Commissioner
- Employer(s): Columbia Law School; Dartmouth College; The University of Vermont; Boston University; U.S. Army; New York State
- Known for: Expertise in medical jurisprudence, mental healthcare, United States constitutional law. Civil War surgery, donating $1 million to charity

John Ordronaux (August 3, 1830 – January 20, 1908) was an American Civil War army surgeon, a professor of medical jurisprudence, a pioneering mental health commissioner and a generous patron of university endowments. Between 1859 and 1901 Ordronaux published at least fifteen books and articles about subjects as diverse as heroes of the American Revolution of 1776, military medicine, medical jurisprudence, mental health, United States constitutional law and historical treatises. He left an estate worth $2,757,000 much of which he gave in endowments to several US universities and other institutions.

== Early life ==
Johh Ordronaux was born in New York City on August 3, 1830. He was the only son of Captain John Ordronaux (a notable privateer of the War of 1812), and his wife Jean Marie Elizabeth Ordronaux (née Charretton). This is supported by the younger Ordronaux's will which mentions a bequest to his sister Florine, and to his nieces Clara and May Molan, matching genealogical information prepared by an Ordronaux family member.

He graduated from Dartmouth College in 1850, from Harvard Law School in 1852, and from the National Medical School in 1859. In 1859 he published his first book, a Eulogy on the life and character of Rev. Zachariah Greene, who, before taking Holy Orders, had fought under Washington in the revolution of 1776 at the age of seventeen. In 1860 Ordronaux became a Professor of medical jurisprudence at Columbia Law School, a post that he held until 1887. Since 1861 he had also been a lecturer at Dartmouth College, The University of Vermont and Boston University.

== American Civil War ==
During the American Civil War Ordronaux served as an army surgeon stationed in New York. He also acted as a military medical advisor and between 1861 and 1863 he published two textbooks on the health of armies, and an instruction manual of medical criteria for examining recruits. In the introduction to the latter, which was written for the United States Sanitary Commission, he said,

The preservation of health in armies, is everywhere a subject of recognized importance. So much, in fact, depends upon it, that precautionary measures in this behalf can never be exaggerated. All that can be done, should be done to protect troops against preventable disease. It seems to have been formerly believed, that the presence of a surgeon in each regiment was all sufficient for this purpose; and that officers and men could go their way free from any responsibility or apprehension on that score. But experience has proved that the preservation of health, in either one man, or many, is not purely objective with surgeons. Too much, in this particular, is expected from them, and too little is done by officers to cooperate with them. Armies, like patients, must act in concert with their medical advisers, and make the matter of health subjective as well as objective. Officers and men need an insight into the general principles of hygiene, in order to be able to assist, themselves, in furthering prophylactic measures. To supply them with the requisite amount of information, the accompanying popular manual has therefore been prepared.

In 1863 he wrote a historical treatise in French (with Reinaud) on the commercial and political relations between the Roman Empire and the countries of Oriental Asia. In 1864 he wrote a second report for the United States Sanitary Commission. This concerned pensions for the war wounded and was subtitled, "On a system for the economical relief of disabled soldiers, and on certain proposed amendments to our present pension laws".

== After the war ==
After the war he returned to Columbia Law School and began writing again. Between 1867 and 1871 he produced a book on preventative medicine and two textbooks on medical jurisprudence. He also translated into English verse the medieval Latin text of Regimen sanitatis Salernitanum, the medical encyclopedia of the Scuola Medica Salernitana. This school in Salerno, Italy was the pre-eminent medical school in Europe in the 11th century. This was not the first English translation but an attempt to make a medically accurate one. He appears to have done this as a tribute to former members of his profession and in an introduction to his work he said,

Regimen Sanitatis Salerni was a work of transcendent merit. Though written in the early twilight of the Middle Ages and in inferior Latin, it at once took its place alongside of such classic productions as the Aphorisms of Hippocrates. No secular work, indeed, ever met with more popular favor, nor infused its canons so radically into the dogmas of any science. It was for ages the medical Bible of all Western Europe, and held undisputed sway over the teachings of its schools, next to the writings of Hippocrates and Galen.

== Work on mental health ==
Ordronaux developed an interest in mental health and between 1872 and 1882 he was a member of the New York State Commission in Lunacy writing two books on the subject. The second of these books mentions the opening of a ground breaking mental hospital and in his preface to the book he says,

The recent establishment of a department of Lunacy supervision by the State of New York, has turned public attention to it as a source for consultation, in the application of our Statute and Common Law to the legal relations of the insane......Insanity is a subject which touches our civil rights at so many different points, that it may be said to have a place in every problem involving human responsibility. It begins with man in the cradle, and follows him to the grave. It is often part of his physical heritage, and may become a qualifying element in all his civil acts. To collect and embody in one treatise the principles of law by which courts govern their adjudications in questions of mental incapacity, and to expound through commentaries both the philosophy of these decisions and the rules of procedure under which they are rendered, is the object aimed at in this manual of Lunacy practice.

Ordronaux's activity as a Commissioner was frequently mentioned in the press. In 1875, he was called in to adjudicate whether a man, who was under sentence of death for murder, was insane. The same newspaper reported again on January 7, 1876, how Ordronaux had found that Kings County Lunatic Asylum was being mismanaged by the charity commissioners (17). He also investigated complaints from two inmates in Buffalo asylum of abusive behaviour by their carers. In his report Ordronaux upheld the complaints and recommended the discharge of the two staff involved. By 1882 his forward thinking and outspokenness had made him some enemies and in 1882 his salary of $4000 as Commissioner in Lunacy was temporarily opposed in debate in the finance committee of the New York State Senate.

== U.S. Constitution ==
Ordronaux's work on State law in New York led him to consider its relationship with Federal law, and in 1891 he published what may be his most important book, on the relationship between the powers of Congress and State legislatures. About this book of more than 600 pages, Ordonaux said in the preface,

The accompanying work is an attempt to present in a concrete form the entire system of Federal and State legislation, as practised under a written Constitution in the United States. Its object is to expound those administrative powers which, in our dual form of representative government, are sovereign within their several spheres of action.....A written Constitution is a political grammar to whose rules administrative laws must conform, in order to give them judicial validity.....The government of forty four independent States, dwelling in harmonious relations under a supervisory Federal sovereignty, would seem, therefore, to justify the treatment of Legislation as a department of jurisprudence meriting more textual consideration than it has yet received.....the present treatise has been prepared to meet the wants of those who, desiring to practise or interpret the canons of representative government in the United States, may seek to master the secrets of its architecture through a study of the labors of its founders, and to trace its genesis and development to a providential origin in the Spartan Commonwealths of our colonial period.

== Later life ==
In 1898 Ordronaux wrote a biography of a Leonice Sampson Moulton, a presumed relative of his foster father, possibly his foster mother. She was born in 1811 and descended from the original Mayflower settlers to America. As Miss Sampson, she was sent on a secret mission to the US embassy in Buenos Aires to enquire into the sovereignty dispute between Great Britain and Argentina over the Falkland Islands. She is interesting according to Ordronaux for, among other things, keeping a very detailed diary which was far more comprehensive than the logs of the ships upon which she travelled.

On June 27, 1901, Ordronaux addressed the graduate students of The University of Vermont. Reading like a tribute to his own life's work he says,

A strange feeling possesses me as I rise to address you......I am here to perform, with much surprise to myself, the same duty which devolved upon me, on a similar occasion, thirty six years ago.......I stand in the presence of two distinct periods with all their differing and startling results. In this long interval, too long to be measured by the standard of months, and falling more properly in the category of cycles, the drama of human society has moved with accelerated pace. A generation has acted its part of good and evil, then passed to its final account. Science, the industrial art, Education, Commerce, Navigation, have all spread their wings as never before. Our country has added nine states to the framework of our Federal Union, and buttressed its Constitution with armor plated Amendments whose necessity had never been contemplated. Our very name, the United States, has changed its former significance and been adjudicated by our highest Appellate Tribunal to be no longer a plural substantive, but a noun in the singular number describing a nation of political equals, and not a league or partnership of States.

Ordronaux died of "apoplexy" at his home, Glen Head, in Roslyn, New York on January 20, 1908. His estate was initially valued at nearly $1,000,000. A large part of his bequests were to hospitals, universities, churches and other public institutions. These included $30,000 to Dartmouth College and $10,000 each to Trinity College, Hartford, Connecticut, The University of Vermont and the Episcopal Diocese of Long Island. However, the New York Times reported on 8 August 1908 that Ordronaux's total estate amounted to $2,757,000, the bulk of which was left to his three surviving sisters.
