= HMS Tenedos (1812) =

HMS Tenedos was a 38-gun fifth rate launched in 1812 and saw action on the eastern American coast during the War of 1812.

== Service ==
Tenedos, part of a fleet under the command of Sir Philip Broke, was assigned to patrol of the coast near Boston Harbor in April 1812. In August of the same year, the Tenedos lost seven men in an engagement with irregular forces off Mount Desert Island, Maine.

While harbored at Halifax, Nova Scotia Tenedos during a severe winter storm on 12 November, broke free of her moorings and almost collided with two ships nearby.

The brig Sarah, R.Pendergrast, master, which had been sailing from New York to Amsterdam when Tenedos captured her on 19 February 1813. Sarah had been carrying a cargo of 425 bales of cotton, 186 barrels of post ashes, and 3000 pipe staves.

Tenedos was part of a fleet that captured USS President on 15 January 1815, just outside New York Harbor.

On 17 February 1815 the War of 1812 ended when the US Congress ratified the Treaty of Ghent and Tenedos returned one month later from patrolling the Eastern seaboard to Halifax in Nova Scotia for the final time. In August 1815, Tenedos returned home to Chatham. She was used as a convict hulk at the Royal Naval Dockyard in the Imperial fortress colony of Bermuda from 1843 and was broken up in 1875.

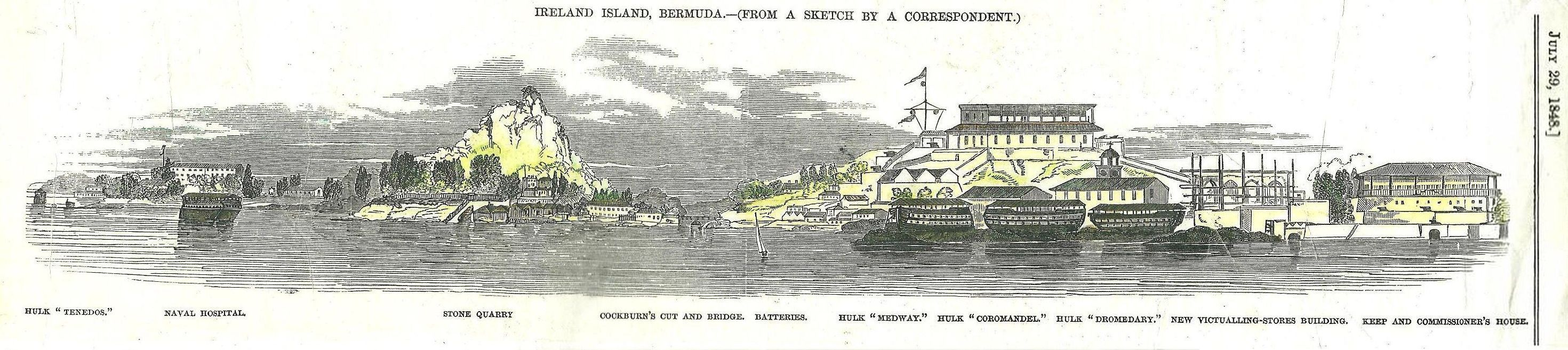
1848 Woodcut of HMD Bermuda, Ireland Island, Bermuda. Tenedos is at far left.

== See also ==
- Stephen Decatur, Commodore in command of USS President at the time of its capture.
