= Capture of HMS Cyane and HMS Levant =

- Part of the War of 1812
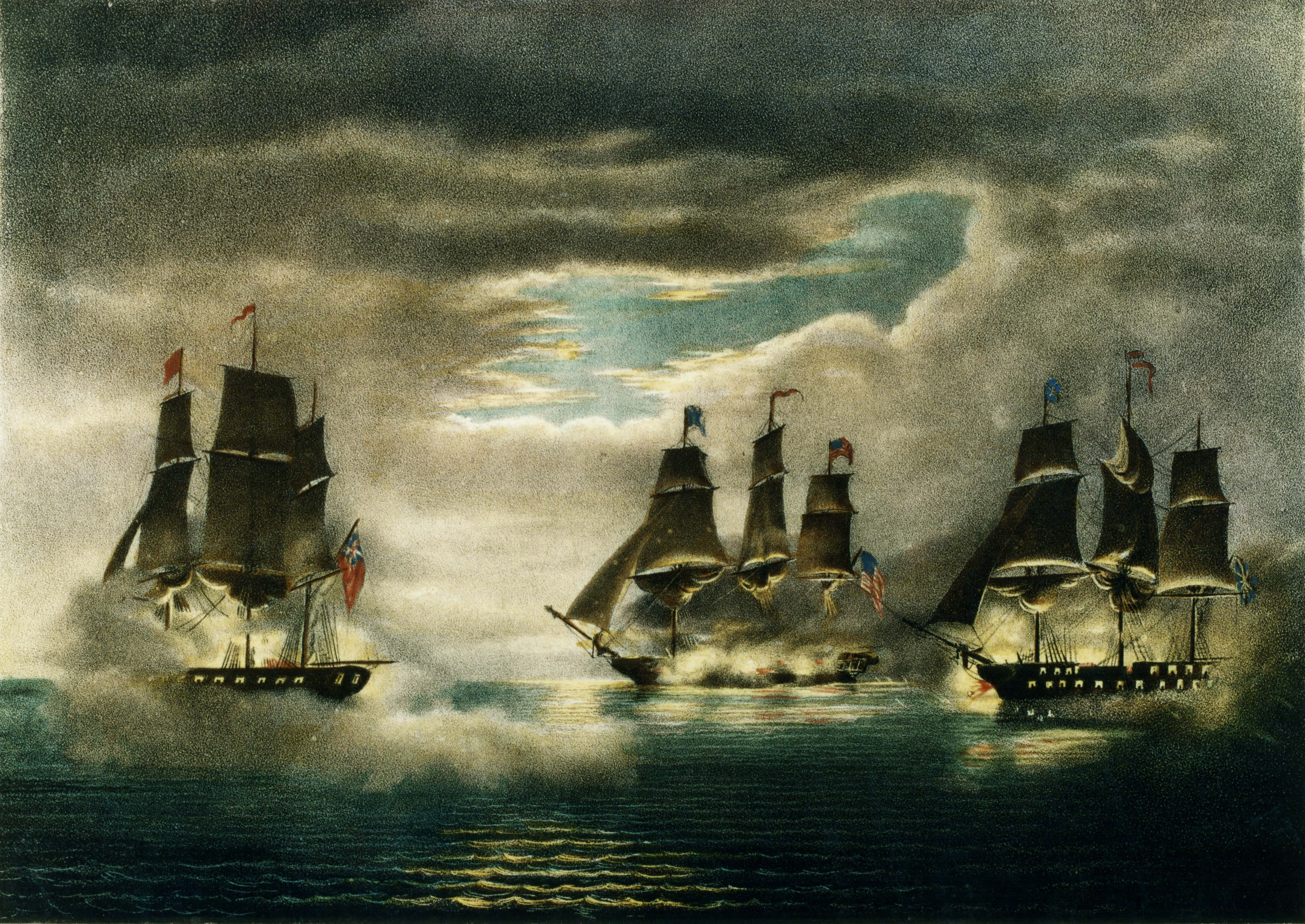
- USS Constitution captures HMS Cyane and HMS Levant
Date	February 20, 1815
Location	mid-Atlantic; Porto Praya, Cape Verde Islands
Result	American victory

Belligerents
United States	(United Kingdom of Great Britain and Ireland) United Kingdom

Commanders and leaders
Charles Stewart; Archibald Henderson	(United Kingdom of Great Britain and Ireland) Gordon Falcon (POW) (United Kingdom of Great Britain and Ireland) George Douglas (POW)

Strength
Frigate Constitution; 450 crew	2 sixth-rates 175 men on Cyane; 135 men on Levant; 310 in total

Casualties and losses
6 killed 9 wounded	19 killed 42 wounded 249 prisoners Cyane captured Levant captured (later recaptured)

The capture of HMS Cyane and HMS Levant was an action which took place at the end of the Anglo-US portion of the War of 1812. The two British warships HMS Cyane and HMS Levant fought USS Constitution on 20 February 1815, about 100 miles east of Madeira. Following exchanges of broadsides and musket fire, both Cyane and Levant surrendered. The war had actually finished a few days before the action with the ratification of the Treaty of Ghent by both sides, but the combatants were not aware of this.

Constitution and the two prizes anchored in Porto Praya in the Cape Verde islands. Levant failed to escape when a British squadron appeared, and was recaptured.

== Prelude ==
The US frigate Constitution, commanded by Captain Charles Stewart, had broken out of Boston late in 1814 in a westerly gale which blew the British blockading squadron under Captain Sir George Collier off station. Stewart then embarked on a commerce-raiding cruise which took Constitution to Bermuda, Madeira, the coast of Portugal and finally back towards Madeira.

At 1:00 pm on 20 February 1815, two ships were sighted to the south, and Stewart set all sail in chase, in an easterly wind. The two ships were the sixth-rate Banterer-class post ship HMS Cyane (sometimes referred to as a "corvette"), commanded by Captain Gordon Thomas Falcon, and the Cyrus class ship-sloop (also a sixth-rate) HMS Levant, commanded by Captain the Honourable George Douglass. Cyane was armed with 22 32-pounder carronades, 10 18-pounder carronades, and two 12-pounder long guns, the slightly lighter Levant had 18 32-pounder carronades, 2 6-pounder long guns, and a shifting 12-pounder. The crews of the two British vessels totaled 310.

Constitution carried a main battery of 30 24-pounder long guns, and 20 or 22 32-pounder carronades and two long bow-chasers Having earlier detached 20 men to a prize, she had a crew of 410 officers and seamen and 41 Marines.

Comparison of force (English measurement methods used for the three ships)

	HMS Levant	HMS Cyane	USS Constitution
Length (gundeck)	116 ft 0 in (35.36 m)	118 ft 2 in (36.02 m)	175 ft 0 in (53.34 m)
Beam	29 ft 10 in (9.09 m)	32 ft 1 in (9.78 m)	43 ft 6 in (13.26 m)
Tonnage	464 tons (bm)	540 tons (bm)	1576 tons (bm)
Complement	135 men	175 men	450 men
Armament	20 × 32-pounder carronades 2 × 9-pounder chase guns 1 × 12-pounder boat gun	22 × 32-pounder carronades 10 × 18-pounder carronades 2 × 12-pounder chase guns	30 × 24-pounder long guns, 22 × 32-pounder carronades, 2 × 24-pounder chase guns
Broadside weight	320 lb (150 kg)	442 lb (200 kg)	716 lb (325 kg)

== Action ==
The two British ships were at first widely separated. Cyane increased sail to close on the Levant and by 5:30 pm, the two British ships were within hail of each other. The two captains resolved to fight rather than split up and try to escape. They at first tried to delay battle until after nightfall, but Constitution was approaching too rapidly and they formed on the starboard tack in line ahead, with Levant a cable's length (Note: A nautical unit of length equivalent to 720 feet (220 m) in the U.S. Navy and 608 feet (185 m) in the Royal Navy . As the source is American (Roosevelt, p.231), the former measurement is probably closer.) ahead of Cyane. The combined broadsides of the two British ships were slightly heavier than Constitution's, but were fired almost exclusively from short-range carronades, and at the range at which the action commenced, 250 yards (230 m), the effect of Constitution's main deck battery of 24-pounder long guns was decisive against the lighter structure and short range armament of the British vessels.

At 6:10 pm, the action began, with Constitution to windward, Levant on her port bow and Cyane on her port quarter. After broadsides had been exchanged for quarter of an hour, the cloud of smoke from the firing which gathered under Constitution's lee hid the British ships from view. Stewart ordered his crew to cease fire, and the smoke cleared in time to allow the US crewmen to see Cyane attempting to cross their stern and rake Constitution. Stewart ordered the sails to be thrown aback, and Constitution instead raked Cyane. As Levant tried to cross Constitution's bows, Stewart ordered the sails to be filled again, and raked Levant from astern. As Levant drifted downwind with battered rigging, Constitution turned again to engage Cyane. At 6:50, Cyane struck her colours.

Lieutenant Hoffman, the second lieutenant of Constitution, took command of Cyane. At 8:00 pm, Stewart set off to pursue Levant, and at 8:50 discovered the British vessel beating back upwind to re-enter the fight, unaware that Cyane had surrendered. The two vessels exchanged broadsides on opposite tacks. Captain Douglas then attempted to escape upwind but at 9:30, Levant was overtaken and also forced to surrender.

Although it was acknowledged that the crews of both British ships had fought determinedly and skilfully, Stewart's ship-handling had been faultless.

== Casualties ==
The US side lost 6 men killed and 9 wounded. Aboard Cyane, 12 men were killed and 26 wounded, some of whom later died of their injuries. Aboard Levant, 7 men were killed and 16 wounded.

It was stated by the British officers, at the court-martial, that the crews of Cyane and Levant were for three weeks kept constantly in the hold of the Constitution, with both hands and legs in irons, and allowed but three pints of water during twenty-four hours. It was further proved that, after the expiration of three weeks, upon the application of Captain Douglas, one third of the men were allowed to be on deck, four hours out of twenty-four, but did not have the means of walking, being still in leg irons; that on mustering the crews when they landed at Maranham, five of the Levant's boys were missing; that, upon application and search for them, two were found locked up in the cabin of the US Marine captain.

== Recapture of Levant ==
Constitution and the two prizes made for Porto Praya in the Cape Verde islands, which were neutral Portuguese territory. They reached there on 10 March. While repairs were being made to all three ships and Stewart was preparing to send off the prisoners in a neutral cartel, a large ship was sighted making for the anchorage. Stewart was preparing to engage when two more heavy ships were sighted, clearly too powerful a force for Constitution to face. Stewart believed that the Portuguese would be unable to enforce their neutrality and his three ships hastily left the harbour.

The approaching ships were Collier's squadron, which had recrossed the Atlantic once Collier had discovered that Constitution had escaped from Boston. They were Collier's own ship HMS Leander (50 guns), HMS Newcastle (50 guns), and HMS Acasta (40 guns). Leander and Newcastle had been constructed in 1813 with 24-pounder main deck broadsides specifically to match the large US frigates.

As the British pursued, Constitution was forced to cut away the boats which the frigate had been towing. Cyane dropped back and Stewart ordered her to tack. She did so, and escaped, being ignored by Collier's frigates. Levant, commanded by Lieutenant Ballard, first lieutenant of Constitution, also fell back, and turned back for Porto Praya. All three British frigates pursued her into the harbour and opened fire, while the British prisoners from Cyane and Levant seized a Portuguese shore battery and also opened fire on Levant. Although the cannonade was ineffectual, the odds were overwhelming and Ballard surrendered.

After calling at a Brazilian port, where Stewart released his remaining prisoners, Constitution reached Porto Rico where Stewart learned that the war had ended some days before he had fought. Cyane reached New York without incident. The Portuguese later paid compensation to the United States for their failure to enforce their neutrality which allowed the recapture of Levant. Sir George Collier was accused of cowardice or incompetence for his failure to engage Constitution at Porto Praya, and killed himself in 1824.

== Notes ==
Footnotes

Citations

== Sources ==
- Forester, C.S. (1956). The Age of Fighting Sail. New English Library. ISBN 0-939218-06-2.
- Roosevelt, Theodore (1882). The Naval War of 1812 Or the History of the United States Navy during the Last War with Great Britain to Which Is Appended an Account of the Battle of New Orleans. New York: Modern Library. ISBN 0-375-75419-9.
- Indiana University, Lily Library, A.Y. Humphreys journal, Humphreys Manuscripts.
