= Gordon Falcon (Royal Navy officer) =

Rear-Admiral Gordon Falcon
- Died: 11 January 1854; London, England
- Military career
- Allegiance: Kingdom of Great Britain; United Kingdom
- Branch: Royal Navy
- Service years: 1794–1848
- Rank: Rear-Admiral
- Commands: HMS Cyane; HMS Melpomene
- Conflicts: War of the First Coalition; Battle of Camperdown; War of 1812; Capture of HMS Cyane and HMS Levant

Gordon Thomas Falcon (died 11 January 1854) was an officer in the Royal Navy. He first went to sea in 1794 as an able seaman on board HMS Sheerness. Quickly promoted to midshipman, Falcon transferred to HMS Repulse and then HMS Venerable, Admiral Adam Duncan's flagship, in which he served at the Battle of Camperdown.

As a lieutenant, Falcon was aboard HMS Leopard when she fired on the USS Chesapeake, causing an international incident. He was promoted to post-captain on 29 October 1813, and soon after was assigned to the newly built HMS Leander. Falcon was in command of the 22-gun HMS Cyane when she and the 20-gun HMS Levant engaged the American 44-gun super frigate, USS Constitution near Madeira on 20 February 1815. Outgunned, both ships were captured and Falcon was made a prisoner of war. After hostilities, Falcon was released and stood trial for the loss of his ship at Halifax, Nova Scotia, where he was honourably acquitted.

Towards the end of his career, Falcon served aboard HMS Royal Adelaide as flag captain to William Hargood, the Commander-in-Chief at Plymouth. He was there in August 1833, during the royal visit of Princess Victoria and her mother, the Duchess of Kent and assisted in their rescue when the royal yacht collided with a hulked ship. On 17 February 1845, Falcon accepted his last position, that of Superintendent at Pembroke Dock and Captain of the Royal Sovereign yacht. He attained flag-rank on 1 August 1848, when he was promoted to rear-admiral, at which point, he retired. He died at his home in London on 11 January 1854.

== Early service ==
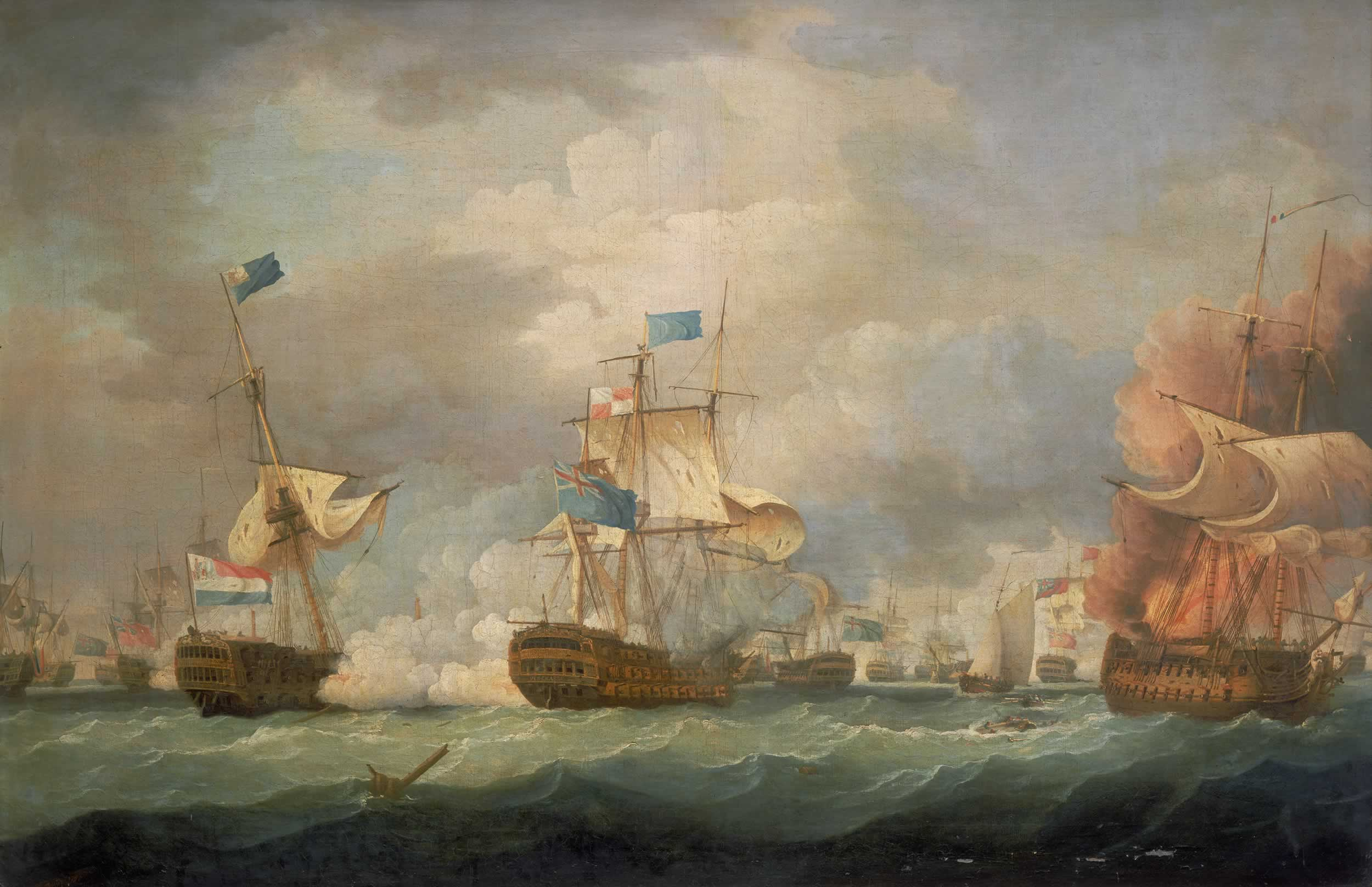
The Battle of Camperdown, where Falcon served as a midshipman aboard HMS Venerable.

Gordon Thomas Falcon joined the Royal Navy as an able seaman in 1794. He first served under William George Fairfax, on board the fifth-rate frigate, HMS Sheerness, Rear-admiral Henry Harvey's flagship, in the English Channel. Falcon was quickly promoted to midshipman and followed Fairfax, first into HMS Repulse, and then HMS Venerable, Admiral Adam Duncan's flagship. Falcon was on board the latter when she fought at the Battle of Camperdown shortly after which, in 1798, he transferred to the newly constructed HMS Kent. That year, he also spent three months as Acting-Lieutenant, aboard the 20-gun HMS Champion.

In 1799, still serving in home waters, Falcon was twice more acting-lieutenant; first in the 18-gun HMS Busy, then later in the frigate, HMS Hyaena. He was confirmed as lieutenant on 15 May 1800 and transferred to the armed ship, Wright. Falcon moved to the 32-gun HMS Andromeda on 23 August and in her, sailed for the Leeward Islands that December. He was part of the force that seized Danish and Swedish possessions in the West Indies in retaliation for their part in the League of Armed Neutrality.

On 21 July 1803, Falcon joined HMS Cambrian, then serving as the flagship of Sir Andrew Mitchell, on the North America and West Indies Station. He later followed Mitchell into HMS Leander and while aboard, on 23 February 1805, assisted in the capture of the 46-gun, French frigate, Ville de Milan, and the simultaneous re-capture of her prize, the 32-gun Cleopatra. Ville de Milan, under Captain Pierre Guillet, and Cleopatra, which had been captured the day before, were forced to surrender after a chase of some four hours. Both had been badly damaged in their previous engagement and struck without a fight.

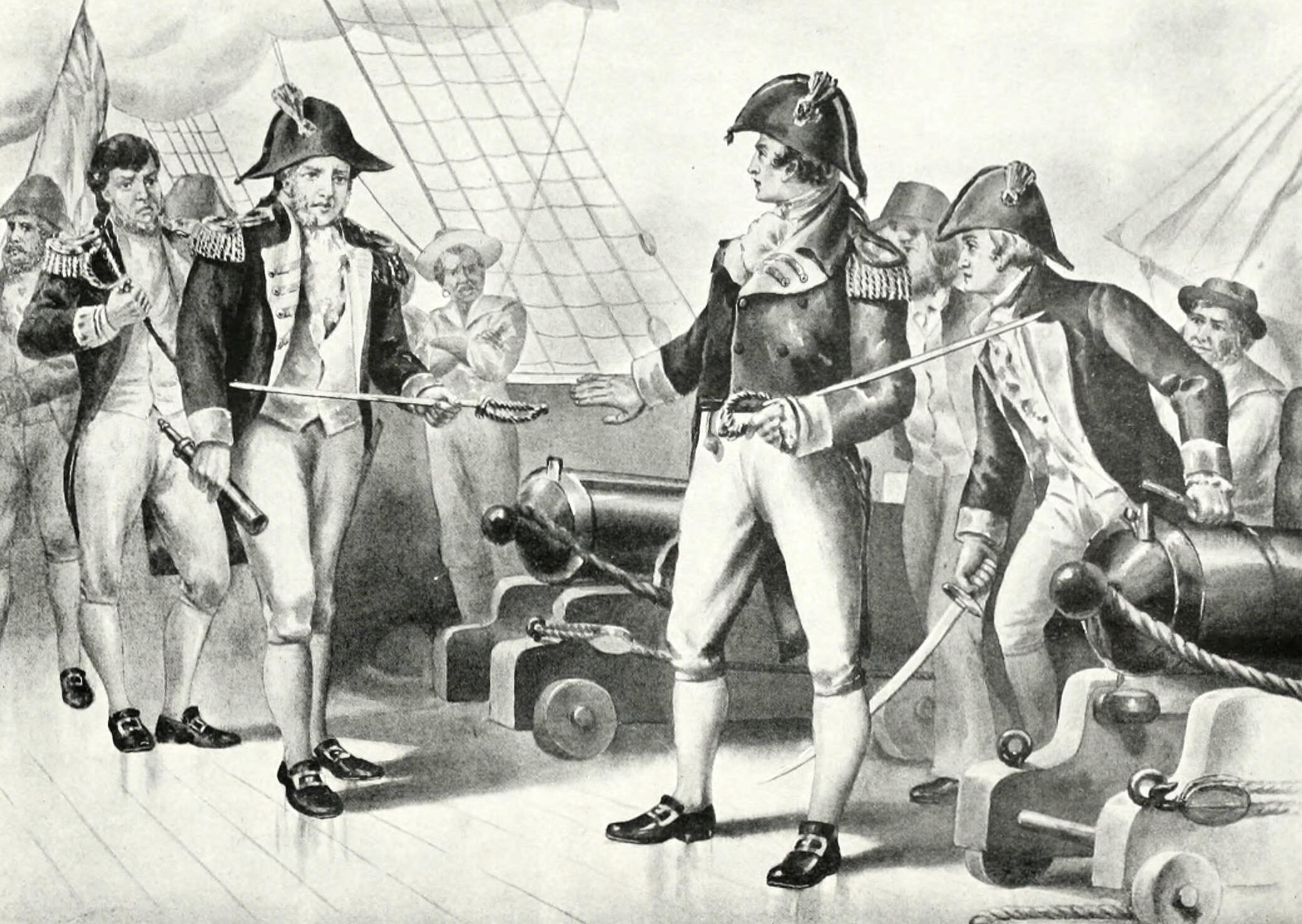
Chesapeake's officers offering their swords to Leopard's officers. Falcon was one of the British officers that boarded.

In 1806, Falcon joined HMS Leopard and was still a member of the crew on 22 June 1807 when the Chesapeake–Leopard affair occurred. Having received intelligence that British deserters were aboard, Leopard had been sent from Halifax, Nova Scotia, with orders to stop and search the American frigate. While anchored off Cape Henry, Chesapeake was spotted putting to sea. Using the ruse of having dispatches, an officer from Leopard boarded the Chesapeake. When the true purpose of the visit was revealed, the American captain pretended not to know of any such men and refused to allow a search of his ship. The British officer returned to his ship, which then opened fire. When Chesapeake surrendered, Falcon, with two other lieutenants and a party of men boarded her and removed four of her crew.

== Command ==
On 8 March 1811, Falcon was given command of the troopship HMS Melpomene. He had been acting-captain of the 38-gun HMS Macedonian. Promoted to post-captain on 29 October 1813, he was soon after assigned to the newly constructed heavy frigate, HMS Leander.

Falcon took command of the 22-gun HMS Cyane on 14 March 1814 and was captured following an enemy action on 20 February 1815. Cyane and the 20-gun Levant were off Porto Santo Island when they ran into the American warship USS Constitution. Falcon seeing the enemy ship off the starboard quarter, correctly identified her and made signals to Levant which hauled up. Although they knew they were outgunned, the British decided to fight in the hope of disabling Constitution sufficiently to save two valuable convoys they had escorted from Gibraltar a few days earlier and that were, at that time, only 30 nautical miles (56 kilometres) to the south.

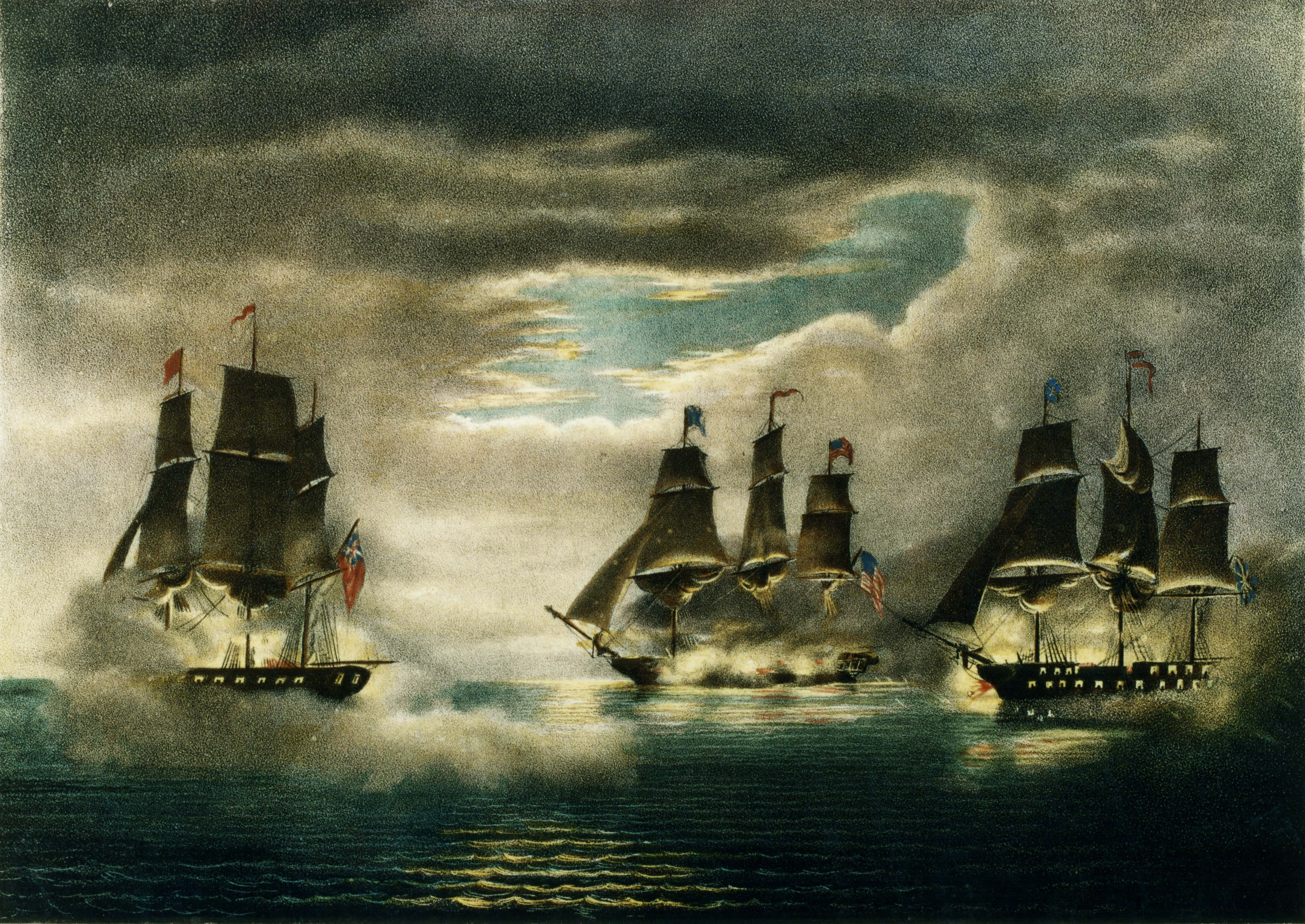
A depiction of the capture of Levant and Cyane by Constitution, painted by Thomas Birch

George Douglas, the commander of Levant and senior officer, proposed to draw Constitution away to the north as far as possible, with Falcon suggesting a line abreast so that both vessels could use their stern chasers at the same time and perhaps cause sufficient damage to slow their pursuer down. It soon became obvious however, that it was not possible for either of them to use stern chasers; the ports on Cyane being too small to accommodate the carronades she carried, and the guns on Levant severely restricting the movement of the tiller.

A running battle proving impossible, and knowing they would soon be overhauled by the much faster ship, the two sloops bore up to engage. When Constitution opened fire on Cyane, twenty minutes later, she was within point-blank range for her long guns but still out of reach of Cyane's carronades. She then engaged Levant, raking her and causing so much damage the latter was obliged to bear away and refit. Falcon attempted to gain position on the American's quarter by bringing his yards hard round but Constitution threw her sails back, bringing Cyane back abeam, and gave her another broadside. With several of her guns dismounted and much of her rigging cut, Cyane endured one more broadside before hauling down her colours. Having undergone repairs, Levant returned 2 hours later to find herself facing the American frigate on her own. Unable to either fight or escape, she too surrendered.

Both Royal Navy vessels were captured and their crews taken prisoner. Released after the war, Falcon and Douglas stood trial for the loss of their ships on board HMS Akbar on 28 June, at Halifax, Nova Scotia. The court martial honourably acquitted them both.

On 24 June 1817, Falcon commissioned HMS Tyne, a sixth-rate of 26-guns in which he served in American waters. In October 1820, he returned to England laden with £700,000 of silver specie. Falcon's next ship was the 50-gun super frigate HMS Isis, which he was assigned to on 1 March 1823. Isis was awaiting completion at Chatham Dock, having been brought from Woolwich, where she was built, in October 1819. On 23 June, he returned to South American waters aboard the 74-gun HMS Spartiate, flagship of Rear-Admiral George Eyre. He transferred with Eyre to HMS Wellesley on 21 August 1825.

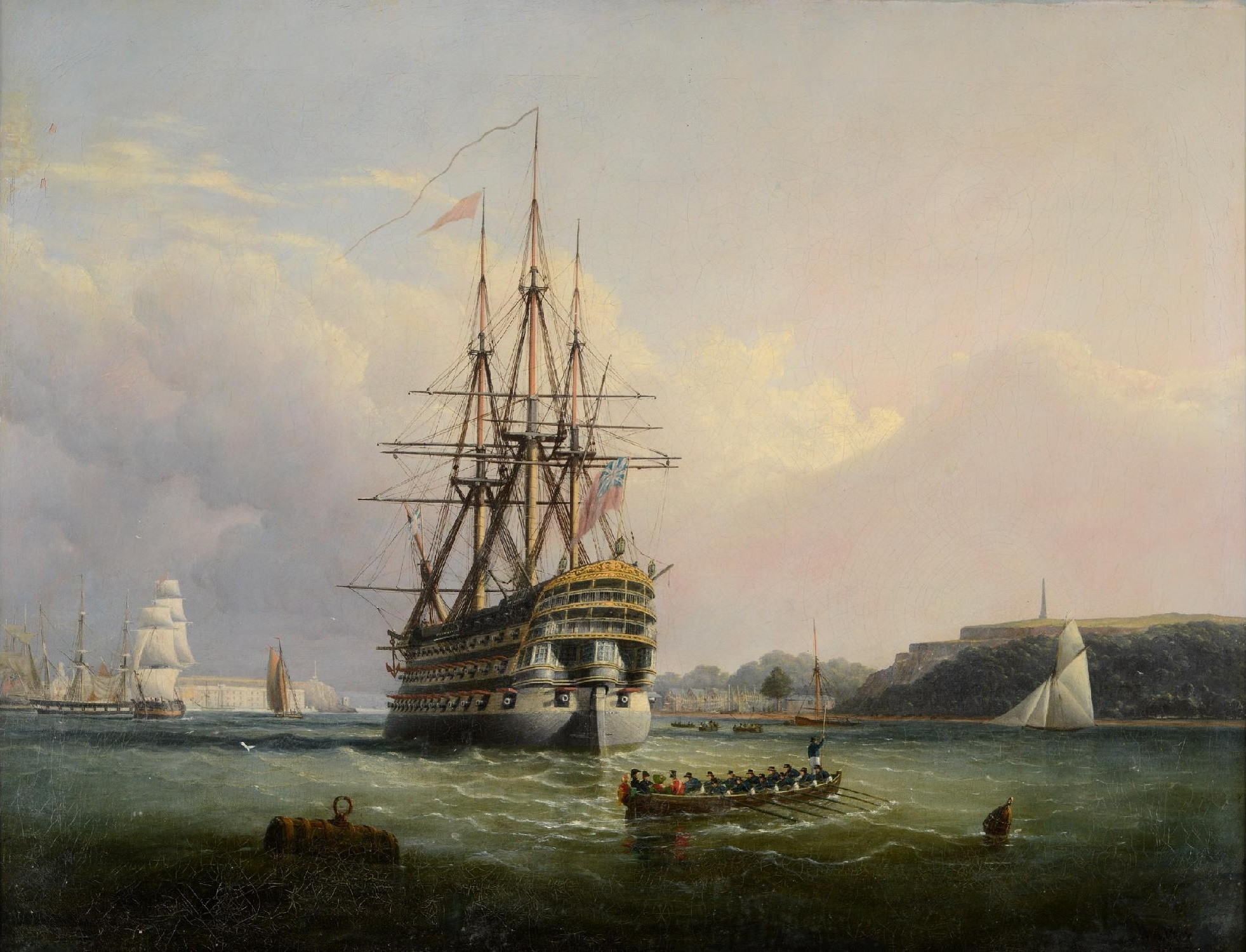
Royal Adelaide at Plymouth, where Falcon served as flag-captain to William Hargood from 1835 to 1845

Falcon moved to the 110-gun HMS San Josef on 1 May 1833 and then, on 5 September 1835, to the 104-gun HMS Royal Adelaide at Plymouth where she was serving as flagship to Admiral William Hargood, the Commander-in-Chief there. In August 1833, Princess Victoria and her mother, the Duchess of Kent, visited Plymouth in the royal yacht Emerald, which because of the light winds was being towed by a steamship. On arriving between St Nicholas Island and the Citadel, a welcoming committee including Falcon, Harwood and the lieutenant-governor of the city, John Cameron went aboard to greet the royal party and provide an escort to the dockyard at Devonport. The route was busy with shipping and Falcon later recounted how he felt the hawser, by which Emerald was being towed, ought to have been shortened to give the steamship greater control. It was not, however, and as the vessels approached their destination, Emerald was swept by a large eddy into a hulk that was moored at the end of the dock. The yacht's mast was put under enormous strain when it became entangled with the hulk's cathead and, fearing it might snap, Falcon, on Hargood's advice, ordered the admiral's barge alongside so that the royal visitors might be evacuated. While the barge was making preparations, Falcon took the added precaution of inviting the princess to stand before the mast so that if it fell she would be in the least danger.

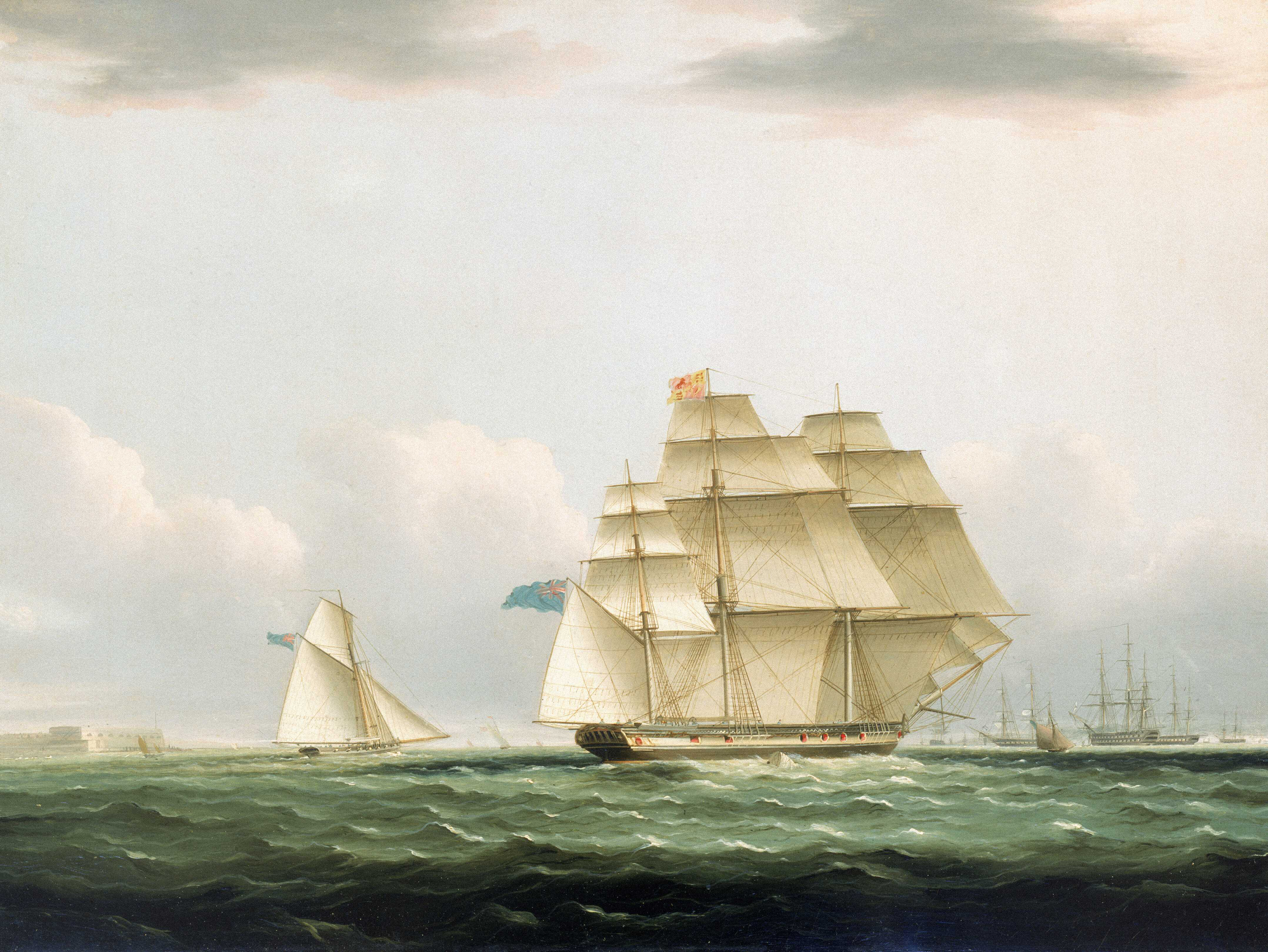
The royal yacht HMS Sovereign, Falcon's last command afloat, pictured at Spithead in 1827.

Falcon remained in his post at Plymouth until 30 April 1836, when he was paid off.

On 17 February 1845, Falcon accepted the position of Superintendent at Pembroke Dock and Captain aboard the Royal Sovereign yacht. This was Falcon's last command. He attained flag-rank on 1 August 1848, when he was promoted to rear-admiral, and resigned his position.

== Personal life ==
On 7 October 1834, Falcon married Louisa, the widow of a Captain Cursham, and daughter of the deceased Richard Meyrick of Runkton, Sussex. They later had children.

Falcon died at his home at Westbourne Terrace, London, on 11 January 1854.
