= USS Rattlesnake (1813) =

United States
- Name: Rambler
- Owner: Benjamin Rich
- Builder: Charles Turner, Medford, Massachusetts (S.Lapham's yard)
- Launched: 1812
- Fate: Sold 1813

United States
- Name: USS Rattlesnake
- Namesake: Rattlesnake
- Operator: U.S.Navy
- Acquired: 1813 by purchase
- Captured: 22 June or 11 July 1814

General characteristics
- Tons burthen: 26824/94, or 278 (bm)
- Armament: 14 guns

USS Rattlesnake was the brig Rambler built in Medford, Massachusetts, in 1812 that the United States Navy purchased in July 1813. Rattlesnake captured numerous British merchant vessels before HMS Leander captured her in mid-1814. The Royal Navy apparently purchased her at Nova Scotia, but there is no record of her subsequent career.

== Career ==
Captain Benjamin Rich sold his brig Rambler to Amos Binney, the agent for the United States Navy on 3 July 1813 for $18,000, exclusive of armament.

Rattlesnake sailed from Portsmouth, New Hampshire 10 January 1814, under the command of Master Commandant John O. Creighton, and sailed with Enterprise cruising the Caribbean. The two ships took three prizes prior to their separation in response to the appearance of a heavily gunned British ship on 25 February.

Rattlesnake, fleeing back to friendlier waters, put into Wilmington, North Carolina on 9 March. Together, Rattlesnake and Enterprise had taken five prizes:

- Brig Rambler, which had been sailing from Cap-Français to St Thomas with a cargo of coffee before the Americans captured and burnt her;
- A Spanish brig, retaken from HMS Belvidera, that arrived in Wilmington;
- Swedish ship Societe, Martison, master, had been bound to St Amelia and went into St. Marys, Georgia;
- Mars, a privateer, of Nassau, arrived at Wilmington; and
- Schooner Eliza, which had been sailing from Nassau to Pensacola.

Rattlesnake was soon back at sea under the command of Lt. James Renshaw. She apparently captured some eight merchant vessels in the eastern Atlantic, north of the equator. On 31 April she captured Henry Dundas, but released her after having taken off the most valuable part of her cargo. On 31 May Rattlesnake encountered a British frigate, but escaped by throwing all but two of her guns overboard. She then captured two more merchant vessels.

In June she captured and destroyed John, Geddes, master, which had been sailing from Liverpool to Oporto. Before 11 July she captured and destroyed Crown Prince of Poole, Street, master, which had been sailing from Newfoundland to Alicante.

Rattlesnake's depredations ended (arguably) on 22 June when the 50-gun British frigate Leander captured her off Cape Sable, the southern point of the island of the same name which lies off Nova Scotia. Leander was renowned for her speed, especially in the heavy weather conditions on the day of Rattlesnake's capture.

The letter from Captain George Collier of Leander is dated 11 July and states that Rattlesnake was armed with 22 guns, all of which she had thrown overboard during the chase, and that she had a crew of 131 men.

The records of the Vice admiralty court at Halifax give the date of capture as 11 July, which is more consistent with the letter reporting the capture than is 22 June. It is also more consistent with the report in Lloyd's List that Rattlesnake went into Halifax on 13 July.

The Vice admiralty court reported the name of Rattlesnake's master as J. Renshaw, and describes her as a brig of 280 to 300 tons (bm), of 14 guns and 130 men.

In any case, the Halifax Dockyard reported on 31 July 1814 that the Royal Navy had purchased Rattlesnake. However, no further record exists.

== See also ==
- List of ships captured in the 19th century
- Bibliography of early American naval history
