= Henry Dundas (1793 ship) =

History

Great Britain
- Name: Henry Dundas
- Namesake: Henry Dundas, 1st Viscount Melville
- Owner: 1810:Captain & Co.; Thereafter: various
- Builder: Kirkcaldy
- Launched: 1793
- Fate: Foundered 1814

General characteristics
- Tons burthen: 95 (bm)
- Propulsion: Sail
- Armament: 6 × 3&4-pounder guns

Henry Dundas was launched at Kirkcaldy in 1793 but does not appear under that name until 1810. An American privateer captured her but then released her in April 1814. She disappeared, presumed foundered with the loss of all hands, after having been last seen in December.

== Career ==
Henry Dundas was lengthened and rebuilt in 1802. However, she only enters Lloyd's Register in 1810, and the Register of Shipping in 1811. In 1810, her master is J. Brown, and her trade is Lieth—Teneriffe.

Thereafter, Lloyd's Register and the Register of Shipping give not entirely consistent reports of masters, owners, and trades.

Year	Master	Owner	Trade	Source
1811	J.Brown	Fotheringham	Greenock—Gibraltar	Lloyd's Register
1811	J.Brown	Capt. & Co.	Lieth—Teneriffe; London—Madeira	Register of Shipping
1812	J.Brown	Cassell & Co.	Greenock—Malta	Lloyd's Register
1812	Brown	Capt. & Co.	London—Madeira	Register of Shipping
1813	J. Beatson; T. Rockwood	Cassell & Co.	London—Malta	Lloyd's Register
1813	J. Beatson	Capt. & Co.	London—Heligoland	Register of Shipping
1814	Rockwood; T. Davidson	Cassell & Co.	Greenock-Lisbon	Lloyd's Register
1814	Rockwood; T. Davidson	Capt. & Co.	London—Heligoland; London—Madeira	Register of Shipping

The American warship Rattlesnake captured Henry Dundas on 31 April 1814, but released her after Rattlesnake had divested Henry Dundas of the most valuable part of her cargo. Henry Dundas had been on her way to Lisbon.

== Fate ==
Henry Dundas departed on 4 December from Portsmouth, Hampshire, for São Miguel Island, Azores. There was no further trace of her, and she was presumed to have foundered with the loss of all hands.

Lloyd's Register for 1816 still carried her, but with the addendum, "missing". She did not appear in the 1818 volume. The Register of Shipping continued to carry her, with unchanged information, till at least 1820. Still, she did not appear in Lloyd's List after the announcement that she was missing.
