= Fourth-rate =

Historic category for Royal Navy ships

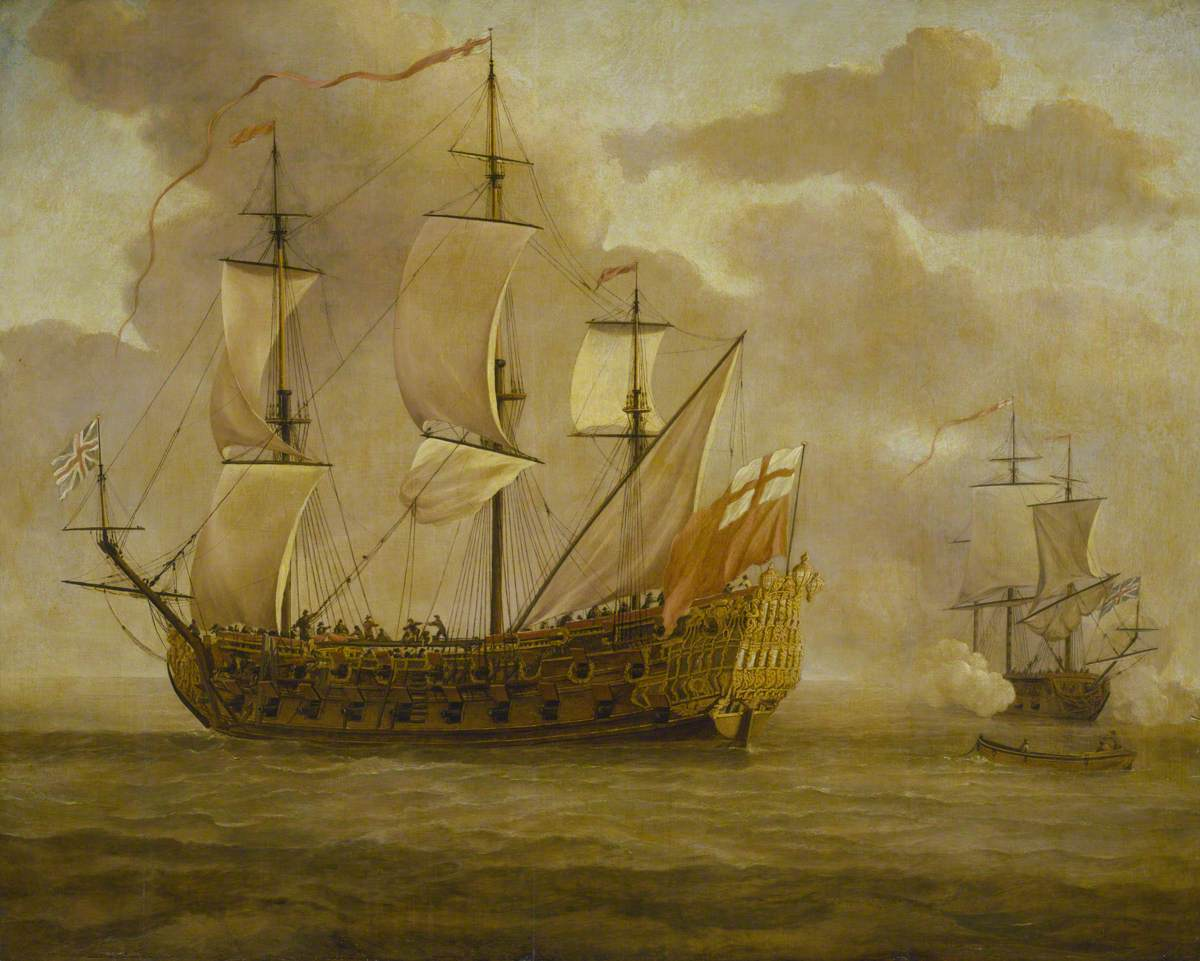
Painting of the fourth-rate HMS Woolwich

In the rating system of the Royal Navy, a fourth-rate was a ship of the line with two gun decks which mounted between 46 and 60 guns. They served in all conflicts the Royal Navy participated in during the early modern period until they were gradually phased out of active service during the French Revolutionary and Napoleonic Wars, as their usefulness was declining. However, fourth-rates often remained in service on distant stations such as the East Indies. Several fourth-rates were created by razeeing larger ships of the line, and occasionally from East Indiamen such as HMS Calcutta.

== Small two decked warships ==
In 1603, all English warships with a complement of fewer than 160 men were categorised as small ships. Between 1625 and 1626, in order to establish pay rates for naval officers, the six-tier rating system of the Royal Navy was introduced. Small ships were divided into three tiers: fourth-, fifth- and sixth-rates. Up to the end of the 17th century, the number of guns and sailors on these tiers were repeatedly adjusted until a definitive system was introduced. A fourth-rate was nominally a ship of over thirty guns with a complement of 140 men.

During the first half of the 18th century, fourth-rates were defined as ships of the line which mounted between 46 and 60 guns. While the number of guns stayed in the same range until 1817, after 1756 the ships of 50 guns and below were considered too weak to stand in the line of battle, although the remaining 60-gun ships were still classed as ships of the line. However, the 50-gun ship continued to be used largely during the Seven Years' War, and during the time of the American Revolution a whole new group of 50-gun ships was constructed, not for the battle fleet, but to meet the needs of combat in the shallow waters off North America where the larger ships found it difficult to sail. 50-gun ships were also suitable as convoy escorts and for service on foreign stations, where larger enemy vessels were unlikely to be encountered. Some fourth-rates saw service as flagships since, as two-deckers, they were able to accommodate a flag officer and his retinue, and they also had the physical presence of a flagship.

Their usefulness was declining, however, and during the French Revolutionary and Napoleonic Wars few 50s were built, although several remained in service, especially on distant stations such as the East Indies. The 60-gun ships were also dying out, superseded initially by the 74-gun third-rates, although by 1793 there were still four 60-gun ships left in harbour service. Some fourth-rates did remain in active service even during the Napoleonic Wars, especially in the shallow North Sea, where the Royal Navy's main opponents were the Baltic powers and the Batavian Republic, whose navies' ships of the lines consisted mainly of 50- to 64-gun ships (e.g. the 56-gun Batavian Navy ship of the line Delft). However, HMS Leander, 50 guns, was with Horatio Nelson at the Battle of the Nile. As late as 1807, fourth-rates were active in combat zones, illustrated by the fatal incident between HMS Leopard (50 guns), and the US frigate Chesapeake (38 guns), an incident which nearly led to war.

== Large frigates and spar-decked frigates ==
American 44-gun frigates Constitution, United States and President were never in operational use armed with fewer than 50 guns including carronades, and were generally seen as equivalent to fourth-rates. The larger British 24-pounder frigates such as the later 1813 Leander and Newcastle, were of similar firepower to those big American 44s. The latter were launched (or razéed – i.e. converted by cutting down by one deck from existing smaller third-rate 74-gun two-deckers) during the last years of the Napoleonic War and the War of 1812 and were classed as fourth-rates in Royal Naval service under the revised rating system. This convention continued into the 19th century. Any of these later large fourth-rate frigates threw a close-range broadside (including from their heavy carronades) far superior to the earlier two-decker 50s or even to third-rate 64s.

== Merchant conversions ==
Some ships of commerce such as the East Indiamen were heavily armed to protect themselves from pirates and privateers, effectively making them equivalent to fourth-rate ships of the line. The Royal Navy also converted some East Indiamen into fourth-rates for convoy duty, such as HMS Calcutta.

== Bibliography ==
- Archibald, E. H. H. (1987) [1971, 1972]. The Fighting Ship of the Royal Navy, 897–1984 (revised ed.). Military Press. ISBN 0517633329.
- Bennett, G. (2004). The Battle of Trafalgar. ISBN 1-84415-107-7.
- Rodger, N. A. M. (2004). The Command of the Ocean, a Naval History of Britain 1649–1815. ISBN 0-7139-9411-8.
- Winfield, Rif (1997). The 50-gun Ship. Chatham Publishing. ISBN 1-86176-025-6.
- Winfield, Rif (2009). British Warships in the Age of Sail 1603–1714: Design, Construction, Careers and Fates. Seaforth Publishing. ISBN 978-1-84832-040-6.
- Winfield, Rif (2007). British Warships in the Age of Sail 1714–1792: Design, Construction, Careers and Fates. Seaforth Publishing. ISBN 978-1-84415-700-6.
- Winfield, Rif (2008) [2005]. British Warships in the Age of Sail 1793–1817: Design, Construction, Careers and Fates (2nd, revised ed.). Seaforth. ISBN 978-1-84415-717-4.
- Winfield, Rif (2014). British Warships in the Age of Sail 1817–1863: Design, Construction, Careers and Fates. Seaforth Publishing. ISBN 978-1-84832-169-4.
