= Adventure (1804 ship) =

History

France
- Captured: 1803

United Kingdom
- Name: Adventure
- Acquired: 1804 by purchase of a prize
- Fate: Wrecked 28 April 1808

General characteristics
- Tons burthen: 294 (bm)
- Length: 97 ft 6 in (29.7 m)
- Beam: 26 ft 7 in (8.1 m)
- Armament: 12 × 6-pounder guns
- Notes: Two decks and three masts

Adventure was a French privateer captured in 1803. She became a whaler that made two voyages to the Southern Whale Fishery. She was wrecked in April 1808 as she set out on her third.

== Capture ==
On 2 October 1803 HMS Acasta captured the French privateer Adventure. Adventure was out of Bordeaux and carried 20 guns and a crew of 144 men. Acasta pursued her in the mid-Atlantic for 45 hours, finally bringing her to action and capturing her. Acasta also recaptured two prizes, Royal Edward and St. Mary's Planter, that Adventure had taken from the Jamaican convoy and whose captains were aboard Adventure. When Acasta intercepted Adventure, she had been about to take possession of Jane, before going after a fourth ship of the convoy. Acasta sent Venturé, Royal Edward, and St. Mary's Planter into Plymouth.

== Whaler ==
The London-based shipowner Daniel Bennett purchased a French prize that Acasta had captured, and renamed her Adventure. At the time Bennett was the most important ship-owner in the Fishery and had some 17 vessels out whale hunting.

Adventure first appeared in the Register of Shipping for 1805 with J. Page, master, Bennett, owner, and trade London–Southern Fishery.

1st whaling voyage (1804-1806): Captain John Page (or Paget) sailed from England on 3 September 1804, bound for Peru. Adventure was at Easter Island at some point in 1805 and may have brought a young Easter Islander to England when she returned on 28 April 1806.

2nd whaling voyage (1806-1808): Captain Page sailed on 20 June 1806, bound for Delagoa Bay. A report on 15 January 1808 stated that Adventure was at Delagoa Bay on 1 August 1807, but that Page had died. Captain William Parker (or Barker) returned to England on 6 March 1808.

== Fate ==
Captain William Parker sailed in April 1808. Lloyd's List reported on 3 May 1808 that Adventure, Parker, master, had become a total loss on 28 April 1808 on the North Sand Head, near Deal, Kent, while sailing from London for the South Seas. The pilot and one crewman had drowned. Adventure drifted off and had been towed on shore near Margate.
