= HMS Newcastle (1813) =

UK naval frigate (1814–1850)

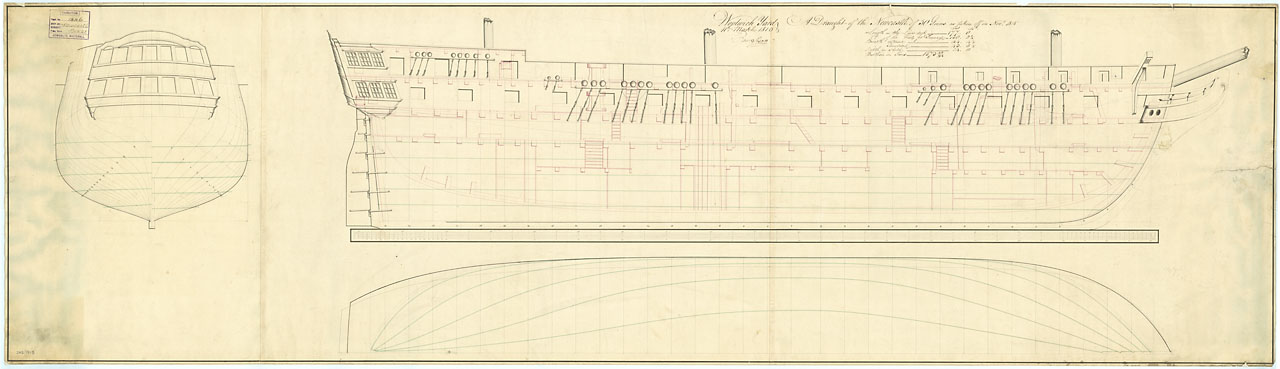
- Newcastle

History

United Kingdom
- Name: HMS Newcastle
- Ordered: 6 May 1813
- Builder: Wigram, Wells & Green, Blackwall
- Laid down: June 1813
- Launched: 10 November 1813
- Completed: By 23 March 1814
- Fate: Broken up in June 1850

General characteristics
- Class & type: 50-gun fourth rate
- Tons burthen: 1,556 bm
- Length: 176 ft 5 in (53.8 m) (gundeck); 149 ft 5 3/4 in (45.6 m) (keel)
- Beam: 44 ft 8 in (13.6 m)
- Depth of hold: 15 ft 1 1/2 in (4.6 m)
- Sail plan: Full-rigged ship
- Crew: 450
- Armament: Upper deck: 30 × 24-pounder guns; Spar deck: 24 × 42-pounder carronades; Fc: 4 × 24-pounder guns

HMS Newcastle was a 50-gun fourth rate of the Royal Navy which saw service in the Napoleonic Wars and the War of 1812.

A new type of warship, a large spar-decked frigate, Newcastle and her near sister HMS Leander were a response to the threat the heavy American spar-decked frigates posed during the War of 1812. Newcastle proved a successful ship and operated in squadrons that chased the American frigates, but ultimately failed to catch them before the war ended. She spent some time as the flagship on the North American Station before returning to Britain in 1822 and being laid up. She was later converted to a lazarette. She spent the rest of her career in this role, until she was sold in 1850 for breaking up.

== Construction ==
HMS Newcastle was ordered from the Blackwall-based firm of Wigram, Wells & Green on 6 May 1813. She was laid down in June 1813 and built of pitch pine to a design by émigré designer Jean-Louis Barrallier. Built of softwood to get her into service as quickly as possible, Leander was launched on 10 November 1813, less than five months after laying down. She was moved to Woolwich Dockyard and completed there by 23 March 1814. The construction of fourth rates, a type that had fallen out of favour prior to the French Revolutionary Wars, was a response to the American spar-decked frigates, like USS Constitution and USS President. Ordered alongside Newcastle was the similar 50-gun HMS Leander. (Note: Though similar in concept, Newcastle and Leander were not sister ships, Newcastle having been designed by émigré shipwright Jean-Louis Barrallier.)

Newcastle was a spar-deck frigate, designed to carry thirty 24-pounders on her main deck, and twenty-four 42-pounder carronades on her spar deck (two fewer carronades than her half-sister), with four 24-pounders on her forecastle. In 1815, after the War of 1812 and Napoleonic Wars, Newcastle and Leander were fitted with accommodation for a flag officer with a poop deck built over the quarterdeck, and were mostly used as flagships on foreign stations, replacing older 50-gun ships that had previously filled this role. Both ships were re-rated as 60-gun fourth rates in February 1817.

== Career ==
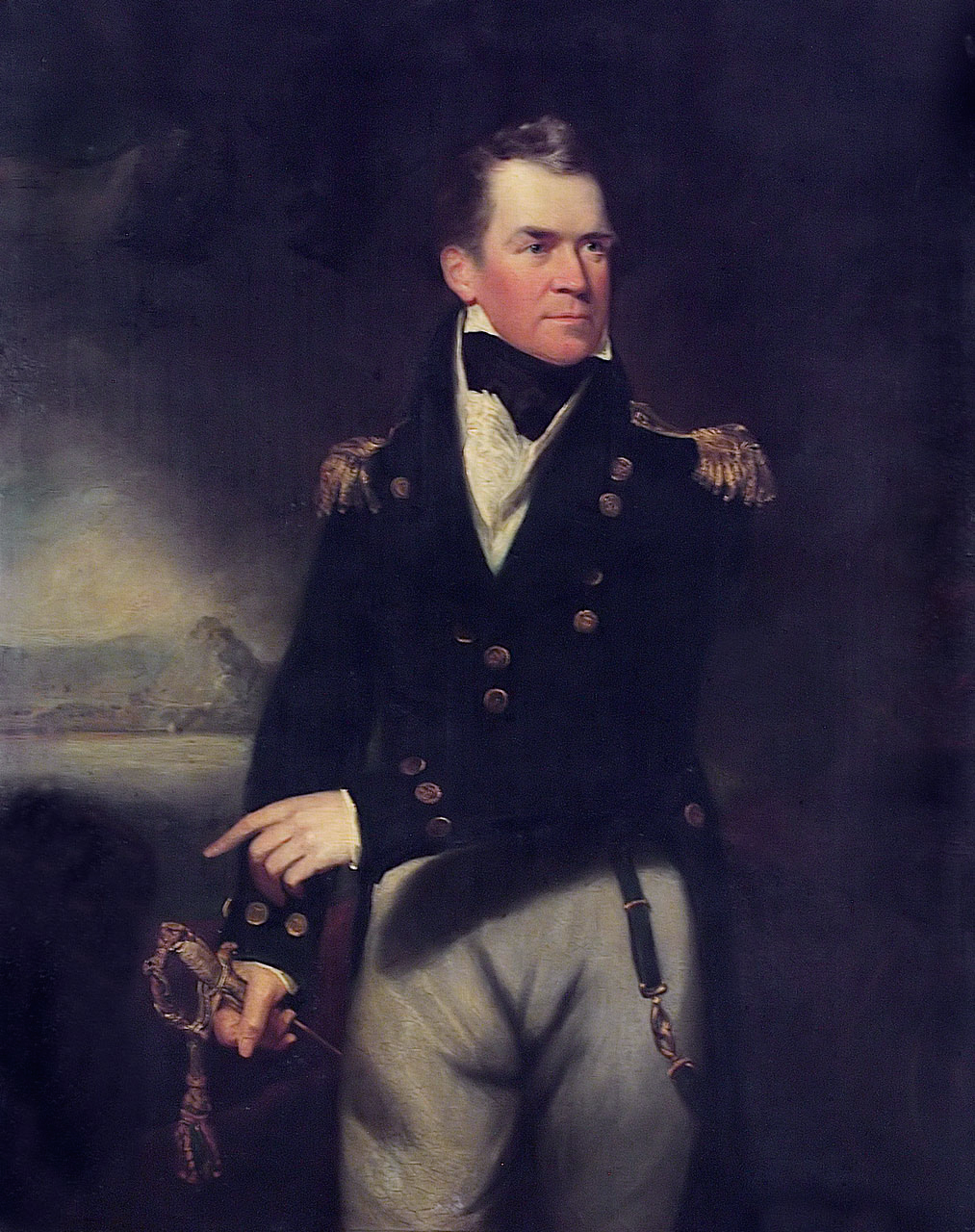
George Collier, Newcastle's first commander, by William Beechey. A star frigate captain with distinguished service off the Spanish coast to his credit, Collier's failure to catch a fleeing American frigate during his time in command of Leander was ultimately his downfall.

Newcastle was commissioned under her first commander, Captain George Collier, in November 1813, but Collier was moved to command of the Leander a month later, and was replaced as commander by Captain Lord George Stuart.

On 23 May 1814 Newcastle ran down Diligence, Grant, master, which was sailing from Southampton to Guernsey with 40 passengers. The passengers were all saved but the mate on Diligence drowned. Diligence was towed back to Southampton and Newcastle had to put back to Portsmouth for repairs.

Newcastle, Leander, and Acasta shared the proceeds of the capture on 28 December 1814 of the notorious American privateer Prince de Neufchatel. Her most famous captain, John Ordronaux, who was also one of her three owners and who had inflicted massive casualties on the boats of Endymion, was apparently not her captain at the time; her commander was Nicholas Millin. At the time of her capture, Prince de Neufchatel was armed with 18 guns and had a crew of 129 men. She was eight days out of Boston. (Note: A first-class share of the prize money was £108 7s 1d; a sixth-class share was 12s 9¾d.)

On 4 January 1815, Acasta, Leander and Newcastle recaptured John. (Note: A first-class share was worth £32 11s 6d; a sixth-class share was worth 4s 4¾d.)

=== Chasing the USS Constitution ===
Leander, under Sir George Collier, had been watching Constitution, then in harbour at Boston. When Collier had to interrupt his surveillance in order to take Leander to Halifax to resupply, he left Acasta and Newcastle off the port. Whilst Collier was away, Constitution and two other heavy frigates left Boston. On his return, Collier prepared to pursue, but had orders to send Acasta into Halifax for a refit. Captain Kerr of Acasta pleaded to be allowed to join the chase; Collier relented and allowed Acasta to remain. The British squadron eventually sighted Constitution in heavy weather off Porto Praya on 11 March 1815. She was proceeding with two prizes, the sloops Levant and Cyane. Due to the weather and some confusion, Constitution eluded the British.

Fire from Newcastle led Levant's crew to run her ashore, where Acasta then captured her. (Note: A first-class share of the prize money for Levant was worth £496 15s 4d, or several years' pay; a sixth-class share was worth £3 5s 4¼d, or about three months' pay.) Collier eventually left Acasta and Newcastle windward of Barbados while he searched for Constitution. However, she had returned to port, thus avoiding an engagement.

== Fate ==
Newcastle was paid off at Portsmouth in January 1822. Between April and June 1824 she underwent fitting there as a lazaretto. She then moved to Liverpool in September 1827. The Navy sold her on 12 June 1850 to John Brown for £2,500.
