= HMS Acasta (1797) =

40-gun Royal Navy fifth-rate frigate

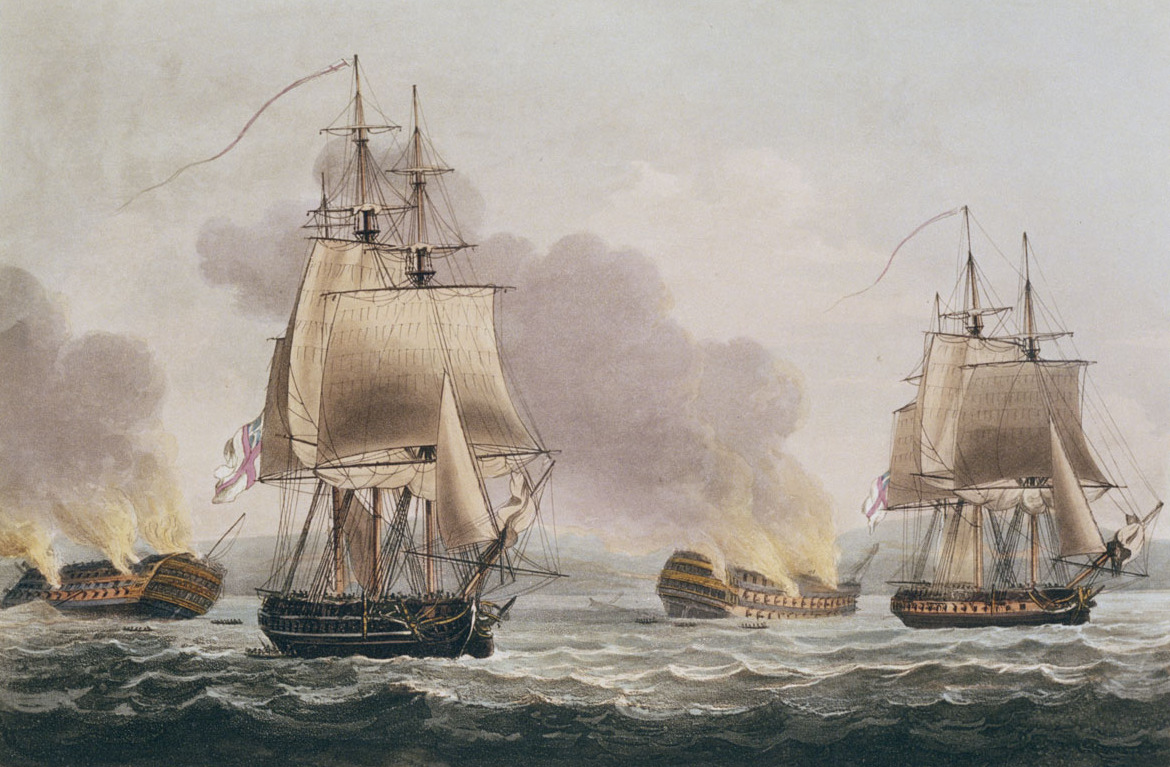
- Acasta and HMS Magicienne at the Battle of San Domingo

History

Great Britain
- Name: HMS Acasta
- Builder: John Randall & Co, Rotherhithe
- Launched: 14 March 1797
- Honours and awards: Naval General Service Medal with clasp: * "St. Domingo"; * "Martinique"
- Fate: Broken up on 1 January 1821

General characteristics
- Class & type: Acasta-class fifth-rate frigate
- Tons burthen: 112722/94> (bm)
- Length: 154 ft (46.9 m)
- Beam: 40 ft 9 1/2 in (12.4 m)
- Depth of hold: 14 ft 3 in (4.3 m)
- Sail plan: Full-rigged ship
- Complement: 320
- Armament: 40 guns: Upper deck:30 × 18-pounder guns; QD: 8 × 9-pounder guns; 4 × 32-pounder carronades (later); Fc: 2 × 9-pounder guns; 4 × 32-pounder carronades (later)

HMS Acasta was a 40-gun Royal Navy fifth-rate frigate. She saw service in the French Revolutionary and Napoleonic Wars, as well as the War of 1812. Although she never took part in any notable single-ship actions nor saw action in a major battle though she was at the Battle of San Domingo, she captured numerous prizes and rid the seas of many Spanish, French, and American privateers. She was finally broken up in 1821.

== Design ==
Sir William Rule designed her to develop a frigate to replace the 44-gun ships that carried their armament on two decks. Consequently, she was one of the largest frigates built in England, mounting forty guns: thirty 18-pounders on one main gun deck, with another ten 9-pounder long guns on the quarterdeck and forecastle. Later eight 32-pounder carronades replaced the 9-pounder guns. She was launched at the yard of John Randall & Co., of Rotherhithe on 14 March 1797.

== French Revolutionary Wars ==
Acasta's first captain was Richard Lane, who took command in February 1797 and oversaw her launch and commissioning. He sailed her to Jamaica in February 1798.

She took numerous prizes in the Caribbean.

- Santa Maria or St. Mary, of four guns and 28 men (1 May);
- San Antonio, pierced for 14 guns (12 May);
- Vengeance, 71 men, and pierced for ten guns but carrying six (20 May);
- Trompe or Trumpe, pierced for ten guns but carrying two and ten men (30 June);
- San Josef de Victorio, pierced for 16 guns but carrying eight, as well as 50 men (2 July); and
- San Miguel y Acandoa (St. Michael Acandoa), of six guns and 28 men (13 July).

In May or thereabouts, Acasta also captured Herondelle, of 10 guns, another privateer of six guns, and a third privateer, pierced for 10 but carrying six and a crew of 40 men. Acasta and Ceres captured St Mary de Louvaine, which was carrying two guns and had a crew of 25 men. On 2 July Acasta and Ceres chased San Josef de Victorio (or San Josef de Victorioso, which had been sailing from Europe, ashore six leagues to windward of San Juan. Acasta sent in her boats to try to get the privateer off, but when they were unable to do so, they burnt her.

On 20 July, Acasta and Ceres destroyed Mutine, Va Tout and Marie. Lane and Captain Otway of Ceres had received intelligence that a French navy brig of 16 guns, two privateer schooners and several other vessels were anchored in Aguada Bay, under the guns of a Spanish fort. The British sent in a cutting out party in boats that according to the account in the Naval Chronicle brought out all the vessels. Mutine carried sixteen 6-pounder guns and one 12-pounder chase gun, all manned with 90 men. The two privateers had four guns each and 45 men as crew. Lastly, there were four schooners that the French had taken as prizes. The British had no casualties though the French may have lost more than 40 men killed and drowned.

In April 1827, i.e., some 29 years later, head money was payable for all four French "vessels of war": San Josef de Victoire, Mutine, Va Tout and Marie. (Note: A first-class share was worth £126 6s 5 1/2d; a fifth-class share, that of a seaman, was worth 8s 10 3/4d.)

In October 1798 Acasta was in company with Trent as they cruised off Puerto Cabello. In late 1798 or early 1799 Acasta captured the French privateer brig Actif (Active), of eight guns and 36 men and the Spanish armed schooner Cincinnatus, of two guns and 33 men. Acasta also burnt a French privateer schooner whose name was not recorded, of six guns and 60 men. With Trent, Acasta captured the Spanish armed ship Penada of 14 guns and 40 men.

Acasta also captured three merchant vessels and destroyed three. With Trent she captured four and destroyed seven.

On 24 May 1799 Lane died suddenly at Jamaica. Captain Edward Fellowes replaced Lane and continued sailing her in the Caribbean. Between May and July, Acasta, in company with Acquilon and Squirrel, captured a Danish schooner that had been sailing from Jacquemel to St. Thomas with a cargo of coffee and dollars.

On 22 May 1799, Acasta captured the Antoine, Desiree, and Lukas. Prize money was due in January 1802.

On 10 November 1799 she recaptured American commissioned the private armed schooner Endeavor, captured by the privateer La Victoire on 6 November.

Acasta captured the Spanish ship Juno, of 130 tons burthen. She was pierced for 16 guns but carried eight and had a crew of 22 men. She was sailing from La Guaira to Cádiz with a cargo of cocoa and indigo. Acasta also captured a polacca of 130 tons and two guns, which was sailing from St. Juan, Puerto Rico, to La Vera Cruz carrying brandy, wine and dry goods. Acasta's boats took the French schooner the Aimable Eustatie, of 20 tons, one gun and 16 men, which was carrying 268 bags of coffee from Cape Francois to St. Thomas. Lastly, Acasta destroyed two French schooner-rigged rowboats and two sloop-rigged Spanish doggers.

In addition to these larger prizes, Acasta or her boats also:

- broke up a Spanish sloop carrying plantains;
- took but then cut adrift the Spanish sloop Nostra Senora del Carmen, which was carrying plantains;
- took, off Ocoa Point, the French Schooner Capricieuse, which had been sailing from Jeremie to St. Thomas with a cargo of 115 bags of coffee;
- took another Spanish sloop off Ocoa Point that was carrying a cargo of sugar;
- cut out from a small bay, 10 leagues leeward of San Juan, Puerto Rico, a Danish ship that had been sailing from San Juan to St. Thomas with a cargo of 30 tons of fustick:
- burnt the Spanish schooner Polly, of 70 tons, in ballast;
- took, but cast adrift, the Spanish sloop Magicienne, which was carrying plantains, corn and stock; and
- took the schooner Lucas, which was sailing under the Danish flag from Mayaguave to St. Thomas with 78 bags of coffee.

Later, Acasta captured a 16-gun xebec carrying wine, brandy and dry goods. She had no papers and so the endpoints of her voyage were unknown. She ran onshore off of the east end of Puerto Rico where Acasta's boats got her off. Next, Acasta took the Spanish felucca Jesus Maria y San Josef, which was sailing from Cádiz bound to San Juan with dry goods, steel and paper.

The capture or destruction of two more armed vessels and several merchantmen followed. One armed vessel was a Spanish schooner of 20 tons that carried four swivel guns. Acasta cut her out of Cape Codera, Venezuela, where she was anchored with her cargo of indigo and cotton. The other was also a Spanish schooner, this of 35 tons, armed with six guns. She was out of New Barcelona and too carried indigo and cotton, as well as hides.

Acasta took or sank numerous small, unarmed merchantmen as well. These were:

- French schooner of 15 tons sunk at anchor near Porto Gravois;
- French schooner Patriotte, of five men and 15 tons, sailing from Baynette to Jacquemel (a distance of about 15 miles), with a cargo 15,500 pounds of coffee, sunk;
- Spanish schooner, of 15 tons, taken off Saona Island, with her cargo of plantains and timber;
- Spanish schooner Saint Jos de las Animas, of 25 tons with a cargo of rum and corn, sunk in Mayaguave Bay;
- Spanish launch, of eight tons, laden with dry goods, sunk at anchor in Cape Codera
- Spanish launch, of nine men and five tons, carrying wine and indigo from La Guaza to Camana, given to the prisoners;
- Spanish schooner Santo Domingo, of 18 tons, sailing from Saint Domingo to La Guira with a cargo of rum and 14,000 dollars, given to the prisoners;
- Danish brig Sally, of 120 tons, taken while sailing from Saint-Bartholomew to Aquada with a cargo of sugar, salt and rum;
- American schooner Betsey, of 90 tons, sailing from Desmara to Saint Juan, laden with molasses and run on shore by the French, burnt;
- French ship Huntress, of 180 tons with a cargo of plank, cut out from Aquada; and
- French schooner Patriote, of 16 men and 40 tons, taken while sailing from Cape Francois bound to St. with a cargo of tobacco.

Around the middle of 1800, Acasta was in company with Amphion when they captured a Spanish brig laden with Tortula (Tortola) sugar, logwood, cotton, cochineal, etc. Acasta was in company with Queen, Brunswick, and Aquilon when they took the Spanish schooner San Pablos del Mundo and her cargo of jerk beef. Lastly, Acasta and Queen took the Spanish schooner General Massaredo, which had been sailing from Havana to Campeche with dry goods.

Prize money for the Diana, Fortuna, Les Animas, and the cochineal taken in the Aimable Maria between May and June 1801 was due in July 1802. Apollo shared with Acasta in the capture of the Aimable Maria and her 42 seroons of cochineal. On 27 July 1801 Acasta captured the Spanish vessel Jupiter.

After these successes, Fellowes took Acasta back to England. On 4 January 1802 one of Acasta's marines came before a court martial on Gladiator. The charges were mutinous conduct, throwing a bottle at his corporal, and disorderly conduct. The court martial found him guilty and shortly thereafter he was hanged on Acasta.

In spring 1802 James Athol Wood replaced Fellowes. Acasta spent some time the Mediterranean before returning to Portsmouth on 8 July 1802. She then sailed again for the Mediterranean on 8 November carrying dispatches relating to the Treaty of Amiens. After her return to England Wood again recommissioned her. From January 1803 she was on the North Sea station, based at Lieth.

On 16 February 1803 Acasta was off Ostend. A boat from Acasta with a lieutenant and 13 men was making observations and taking soundings when it foundered. All 14 on board drowned.

Acasta next sailed to Guernsey on 7 March 1803. She was based there until the renewal of hostilities with the French.

== Napoleonic Wars ==
From April Acasta was under the command of Captain James Oswald (temporary). In May Acasta picked up Admiral the Honourable William Cornwallis in Lymington and took him to Torbay where he was to take command of the Channel Fleet. Acasta then joined him in patrolling off Ushant, watching the French fleet in harbour at Brest.

Under Oswald Acasta captured several prizes. First, on 24 May 1803, Acasta was in company with Port Mahon and the sloop Gannet when they captured the Batavian ship Berbice. On 28 May Acasta captured the French brig Margaretta, which had been carrying brandy, wine and the like from Sète to Antwerp.

Then Acasta captured the Batavian ship Zorgwyk on 30 May. The next day Acasta captured the Swedish brig Gustava. That same day Acasta captured the Dutch ship Planter's Lust.

In June Acasta captured the:

- Concorde (1 June);
- Jonge Barends (1 June, in company with Doris);
- Batavian ship Vrou Jantze (1 June, in company with Doris);
- Mère de Famille (2 June);
- La Double Alliance (2 June); and
- Batavian ship Sara Maria.

By 4 July 1803, Acasta, again under the command of Wood, recaptured Caerwent. Then on 2 October, Acasta captured the French privateer Aventure. Aventure was out of Bordeaux and carried 20 guns and a crew of 144 men. Acasta pursued her in the mid-Atlantic for 45 hours, finally bringing her to action and capturing her. Acasta also recaptured two prizes, Royal Edward and St. Mary's Planter, that Aventure had taken from the Jamaican convoy and whose captains were aboard Aventure. When Acasta intercepted Aventure, she had been about to take possession of Jane, before going after a fourth ship of the convoy.

In late Acasta escorted a convoy to the West Indies. When she arrived at Jamaica, Sir John Duckworth ordered Wood to assume command of Hercule, which was then at sea and which, on its return, would not be available. Duckworth then would return to England in Acasta under a new captain. However, even though Hercule was not in fact available, Duckworth refused to rescind his appointment of Captain Richard Dunn, with the result that Wood returned to England as a passenger in his own ship. On his return to England, Wood demanded a court martial of Duckworth on charges, inter alia, of tyranny and oppression. The court martial board ruled that Duckworth was within his rights and dismissed the charges. The Admiralty re-appointed Wood to Acasta, but he was unable to take up the appointment. The Admiralty then appointed Wood to Uranie. Also, the Admiralty passed a regulation barring an admiral on a foreign station from copying Duckworth's example.

Acasta, under the command of Dunn, next saw action under Duckworth in the Battle of San Domingo on 6 February 1806. Duckworth sent Acasta and Magicienne to reconnoitre, and it was they that signaled that the French were at anchor, but getting under way. Duckworth formed up the smaller ships, Acasta, Magicienne, Kingfisher and Epervier windward of the line-of-battle ships to keep them out of the action.

Donegal forced the surrender of the Brave and directed Acasta to take possession of her, whilst the Donegal moved on to engage the other French ships. Brave This was one of the three that the British captured, the other two being the Jupiter and the Alexandre. To prevent the capture of their vessels, the captains of the flagship, Impérial, and the Diomède, drove them on shore between Nizao and Point Catalan, their hulls broadside to the beach and their bottoms stove in by the reefs. On 8 February Duckworth sent boats from Acasta and Magicienne to the wrecks. Boarding unopposed, the boat parties removed the remaining French crewmen as prisoners and set both ships on fire. (Note: At the second and final distribution of prize money for the battle, a seaman on Acasta received £2 14s 2d.) Lastly, in 1847 the Admiralty awarded the surviving claimants from the action the Naval General Service Medal with clasp "St. Domingo".

On 8 June 1806, Acasta captured the Spanish Prize money droits Fortunata. (Note: In October 1818 prize money was paid in the amount of £155 1s 8 1/4d for a first-class share; a fifth-class share, that of a seaman, was worth 11s 4 1/4d.)

=== Commanding the assaults in the Caribbean ===
In 1807, whilst Acasta was serving in the Channel, Captain Philip Beaver replaced Wood. She escorted a convoy back to Britain from the Leeward Islands in December, and performed the same duty again in 1808. Acasta then returned to the Leeward Islands.

On 17 July 1808 she captured the French navy's corvette Serpent at La Guaira. Serpent was armed with sixteen 24-pounder carronades and two long 6-pounder guns. She had a crew of 104 men under the command of Enseigne de Vaisseau Mons. Paul de Lamanon. Rear-Admiral the Honourable Sir Alexander Cochrane provisionally named her Pert, but as there was already a brig by that name, the Admiralty named her Asp. (Note: Beaver's first-class share of the prize money was worth £276 3s 1d; a sixth-class share, such as would accrue to an ordinary seaman, was worth £2 12s 10 1/2d.)

In 1809 Cochrane decided to attack Martinique. Beaver's role, on Acasta, would be to organize the landing of the troops. Lieutenant-General Beckwith, the commander of the land forces, therefore sailed on her too. The fleet sailed from Carlisle Bay, Barbados on 28 January. On at dawn on 30 January Acasta and the transports were four leagues windward of Carvel Rock. She then led the fleet into Bay Robert, being joined by Ethalion, Forester, Ringdove, Haughty and Eclair; Eurydice had joined the previous evening.

The weather made anchoring off Loup Garou, an islet ten miles from Martinique, too difficult. Beaver decided instead to take his flotilla into the Cul de Sac, with the warships leading to protect the landing. He prepared carefully, sending boats to place flags to mark the shoals. Then Acasta led in Penelope and the transports. The flotilla successfully negotiated the passage with the result that all the vessels were at anchor by noon. The landing commenced and by sunset the first and second brigades, some 4,500 men, and some of the artillery and horses were on shore. By 7am the next morning even the reserve was on shore. On 24 February the French called for a truce after a magazine in the fort blew up as a result of the British artillery bombardment. In 1847 the Admiralty awarded the Naval General Service Medal with clasp "Martinique" to all surviving claimants from the action.

In April, Cochrane was blockading a French squadron consisting of three ships of the line and two frigates that had taken shelter in the Îles des Saintes near Guadeloupe. Beckwith decided to send troops under General Maitland to take the islands and the ships, or at least force them out to sea. Cochrane then appointed Beaver, still in Acasta, as commodore of the division. The fleet sailed from Fort Royal Bay, Martinique, on 12 April with two or three thousand troops. By 10 o'clock on the morning of 14 April the ships were in place and Acasta led Gloire, Narcissus, Circe and Intrepid into the channel and anchored opposite the Bois Joly bay. The frigates covered the landings; the only opposition was fire from guns on the Islet of Cabrit, which fired at the ships from over a ridge. Three days of fighting followed, which resulted in the reduction of the French forts and the capture of the French troops. However, the French squadron had already escaped on 14 April. Acasta was among the naval vessels that shared in the proceeds of the capture of the islands. (Note: The prize agent for a number of the vessels involved, Henry Abbott, went bankrupt. In May 1835 there was a final payment of a dividend from his estate. A first-class share was worth 10s 2 3/4d; a sixth-class share, that of an ordinary seaman, was worth 1d. Seventh-class (landsmen) and eighth-class (boys) shares were fractions of a penny, too small to pay.)

Next, Acasta shared in the prize money for French ship D'Hautpoul, which Pompée, Recruit and Neptune had captured on 17 April 1809. (Note: A first-class share was worth £44 1s 7 1/2d; a sixth-class share was worth 6s 6d.)

Acasta then returned to England and was under repair in Plymouth in 1811, with Captain Alexander Robert Kerr taking over command in April 1811. On 28 August, Acasta was in company with the gun-brig Piercer when they captured Catharina Augusta. Then Acasta was in company with Armide when on 19 October they took the schooner Trojan, which was wrecked. Three days later they captured the schooner Henry.

== War of 1812 ==
On the outbreak of the War of 1812, Acasta was assigned to operate off the coast of America. On 24 July 1812 she captured the privateer Curlew, of 240 tons. Curlew was pierced for 18 guns but carried only sixteen, and had a complement of 172 men. (Note: A first-class share of some gunpowder and other stores aboard her was worth £11 5s 0 1/4d; a sixth-class share was worth 2s.) The Royal Navy took her into service as HMS Columbia.

On 20 August Acasta captured the schooner Patriot, of 140 tons. She was sailing from Norfolk to Lisbon with a cargo of flour, peas, and beans. Ten days later Acasta captured the schooner Betsey, of 127 tons. She was sailing from Naples to Boston with brandy. (Note: A first-class share of the prize money for Curlew and Betsey together was worth £797 19s 6 1/4d; a sixth-class share was worth £7 4s 3 3/4d.)

Acasta then captured the brig Federal on 17 September. Federal was bound for Boston from Prince's Island. (Note: The first-class share of the prize money for Federal was worth £178 9s 9 3/4d; a sixth-class share was worth £1 11s 7 1/4d. A further distribution of the American droit occurred in October 1818. A first-class share was worth £24 16s 4 1/2d; a sixth-class share was worth 4s 4 3/4d.) Acasta also retook the schooner Blonde on 17 October, which had been on passage from Martinique to Newfoundland.

Further success followed on 3 November when Acasta, Maidstone, Aeolus and Childers captured the privateer schooner Snapper of Philadelphia. Snapper was armed with ten guns and had a crew of 90 men. (Note: A first-class share of the prize money was worth £20 8s 11d; a sixth-class share was worth 2s 11d.)

On 10 December Acasta, Poictiers and Maidstone captured the letter of marque brig Herald, bound from Bordeaux to Baltimore. The British took Herald into service as the sloop-of-war Barbadoes. The next day Acasta took the schooner Farmer's Fancy, en route from Charlestown to Philadelphia. Around the 16th, Acasta and Poictiers captured the ship Pekin, sailing from Boston to Alexandria.

Poictiers and Acasta captured the privateer Highflyer on 9 January 1813. Highflyer was armed with five guns and had a crew of 72 men. She was returning from the West Indies, where she had made several captures. The Royal Navy took Highflyer into service under her existing name. (Note: The head money and final payment for hull and stores for the Herald and Highflyer, together, was £52 6s 4d for a first-class share. For a sixth-class share it was 5s 3d.)

Acasta, Poictiers and Maidstone captured the Lydia, out of Rhode Island, on 17 January. Also in January, Acasta and Poictiers captured the schooner Rhoda.

Acasta was one of six vessels that shared in the capture of the American brigs Gustavus and Staunch on 24 February 1813. She was one of 12 sharing in the capture of the American brigs Christina and Massasoit on 3 and 14 March 1813. (Note: A first-class share for some molasses from Gustavus and Staunch was worth £6 7s 6d; a sixth-class share was worth 9d. A first-class share "of a compromise" for Christina and Massasoit was worth £37 9s 3d; a sixth-class share was worth 5s 5d.) Acasta was one of eight vessels sharing in the capture of General Knox on 17 March. (Note: A first-class share of a compromise regarding the vessel was worth £22 6s 8d; a sixth-class share was worth 3s 4d.)

On 17 June 1813, Valiant was in company with Acasta when they came upon Wasp in pursuit of an American brig off Cape Sable. The three British ships continued the chase for another 100 miles before they finally were able to capture the brig. She was the letter of marque Porcupine, of more than 300 tons, and was carrying a valuable cargo from Bayonne to Boston. Captain Robert Dudley Oliver of Vollant described Porcupine as being only eight months old and an uncommonly fast sailer. After the capture, Wasp, which had recaptured a prize that the privateer Young Teazer had taken, sailed in search of the privateer. In October 1830 head money was paid for the capture of Porcupine. (Note: A first-class share was worth £22 10s 8d; a sixth-class share was worth 2s 5 1/4d.)

On 6 September, Captain Oliver of Valiant sent Acasta and Atalante up Long Island Sound "to endeavour to annoy the enemy". They returned five days later, having taken and destroyed fifteen small vessels, most of which they burnt as they were in ballast.

Further captures followed. She sent the American schooner Prudence, of four men and 17 tons, and the sloop Diana into Halifax in July 1814. Then on 2 August she took another two schooners, the Stephanie and the Hazard, and two sloops, the Jane and the Hazard.

On 2 July 1814, Acasta was among the vessels sharing in the capture of the schooner Little Tom and her cargo of lumber, plank, and shingles. (Note: Because eight ships shared the prize money, each captain's first-class share of her cargo was worth £6 17s 3d; a sixth-class share was worth 11 1/2d.)

On 28 December 1814, Acasta, Leander and Newcastle captured the notorious American privateer Prince de Neufchatel. Her most famous captain, John Ordronaux, who was also one of her three owners and who had inflicted massive casualties on the boats of Endymion, was apparently not her captain at the time; her commander was Nicholas Millin. At the time of her capture, Prince de Neufchatel was armed with 18 guns and had a crew of 129 men. She was eight days out of Boston. (Note: A first-class share of the prize money was £108 7s 1d; a sixth-class share was 12s 9 3/4d.)

On 4 January 1815, Acasta, Leander and Newcastle recaptured the John. (Note: A first-class share was worth £32 11s 6d; a sixth-class share was worth 4s 4 3/4d.)

=== Chasing the Constitution ===
Leander, under Sir George Collier, had been watching the USS Constitution, then in harbour at Boston. When Collier had to interrupt his surveillance in order to take Leander to Halifax to resupply, he left Acasta and Newcastle off the port. Whilst Collier was away, Constitution and two other heavy frigates left Boston. Collier prepared to pursue, but had orders to send Acasta into Halifax for a refit. Captain Kerr pleaded to be allowed to join the chase; Collier relented and allowed Acasta to remain. The British squadron eventually sighted Constitution in heavy weather off Porto Praya on 11 March 1815. She was proceeding with two prizes, the sloops Levant and Cyane. Due to the weather and some confusion, Constitution eluded the British.

Fire from Leander led Levant's crew to run her ashore, where Acasta then captured her. Collier eventually left Acasta and Newcastle windward of Barbados while he searched for Constitution. However, she had returned to port, thus avoiding an engagement. (Note: Kerr's first-class share of the prize money for Levant was worth £496 15s 4d, or several years' pay; a sixth-class share was worth £3 5s 4 1/4d, or about two months' pay.)

That same month, Acasta recaptured St Lawrence.

== Fate ==
Acasta returned to England in 1815 where she was paid off to ordinary on 12 September. She was broken up at Woolwich on 1 January 1821.

== In literature ==
In the 1979 Patrick O'Brian novel The Fortune of War, Capt. Jack Aubrey is said to have been assigned to command HMS Acasta, but does not actually meet up with the ship in the book.
