= HMS Levant (1813) =

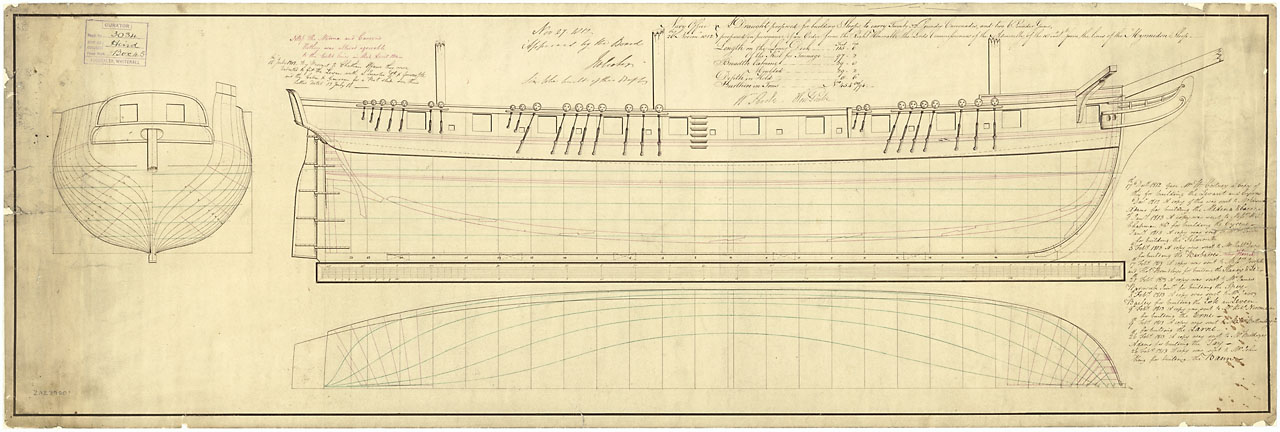
- Levant

History

United Kingdom
- Name: HMS Levant
- Ordered: 18 November 1812
- Builder: William Courtney, Chester
- Laid down: January 1813
- Launched: 8 December 1813
- Completed: By 22 April 1814
- Fate: Broken up by 9 October 1820

General characteristics
- Class & type: Rated 20-gun Cyrus-class sixth rate
- Tons burthen: 464 42/94 bm
- Length: 116 ft (35 m) (overall); 98 ft 1 1/4 in (29.9 m) (keel)
- Beam: 29 ft 10 in (9.09 m)
- Draught: 9 ft 6 in (2.90 m)
- Depth of hold: 8 ft 6 in (2.59 m)
- Sail plan: Full-rigged ship
- Complement: 135
- Armament: 2 × 6-pounders bow chasers + 20 × 32-pounder carronades

HMS Levant was a 20-gun Cyrus-class sixth rate of the Royal Navy built by William Courtney, of Chester. She was captured by USS Constitution on 20 February 1815 during War of 1812. Levant was recaptured on 11 March 1815 in Cape Verde. After 1817, she was reclassified as a sloop-of-war. She was broken up in 1820.

== Career ==
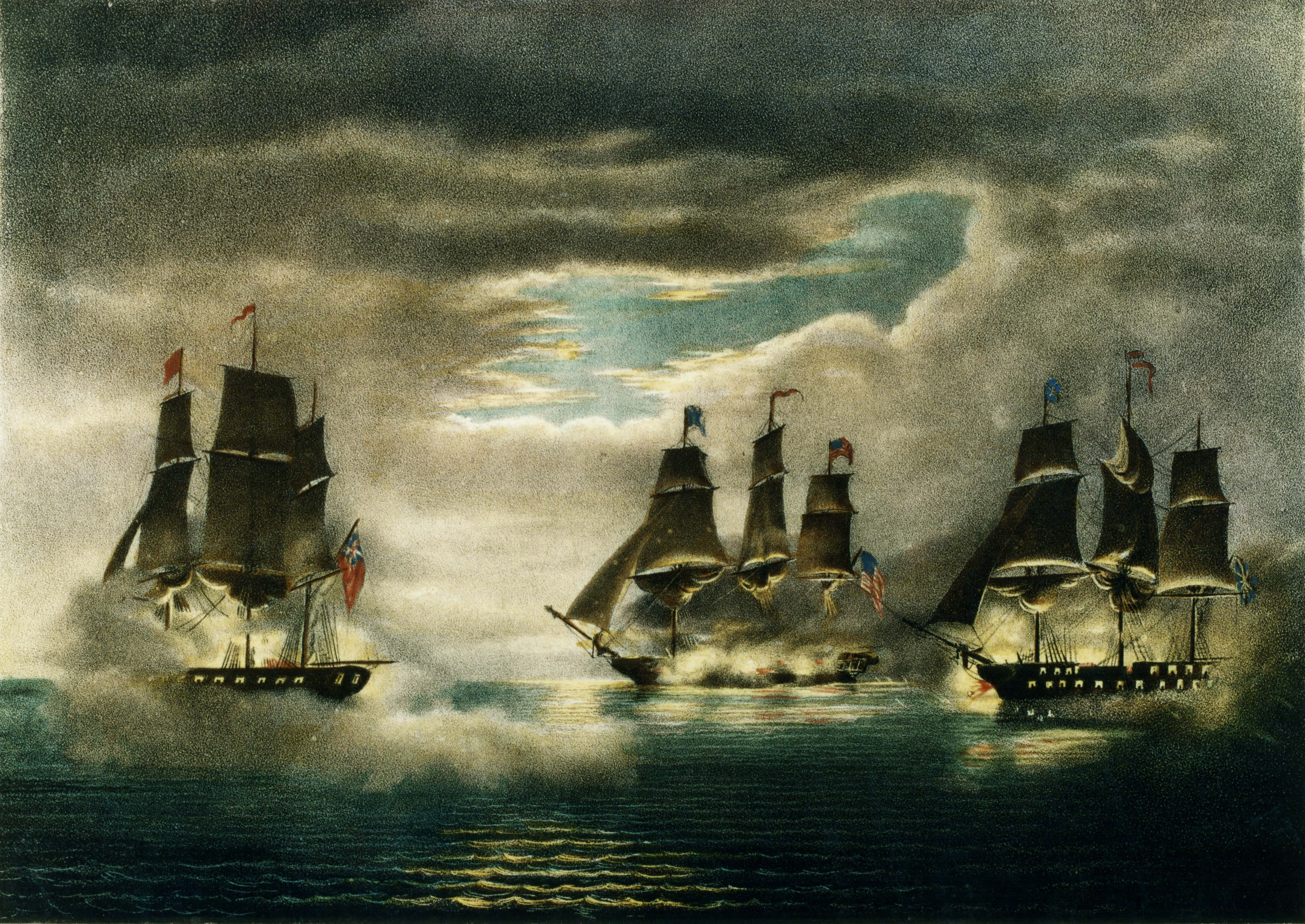
A lithograph showing the capture of Cyane and Levant by Constitution

Levant was one of 16 ships of the Cyrus class that had the underwater lines of the French prize Bonne Citoyenne (though slightly reduced). Levant was launched in December 1813. Her first commander was Captain Alexander Jones (younger brother of Captain Charles Jones) who was replaced by George Douglas on 28 April 1814. Under Douglas, Levant travelled from England to Quebec and then to Gibraltar.

While escorting two British convoys together with HMS Cyane, a Banterer-class sixth-rate vessel, the two warships were attacked by USS Constitution under Captain Charles Stewart on 20 February 1815. Although peace had already been declared Constitution had not received official information about the Treaty of Ghent. Cyane and Levant were able to fire heavier broadsides than Constitution but were still outgunned by range and gun power by the American vessel. With excellent seamanship Constitution outmanoeuvred both ships and forced Cyane to surrender first. After placing a prize crew on board Cyane, Stewart chased Levant down. The sloop surrendered after two broadsides fired by the American vessel and was also taken a prize. With the help of the British prisoners all three ships set course for the Cape Verde Islands.

A British squadron, comprising HMS Leander (50 guns), HMS Newcastle (50 guns), and HMS Acasta (40 guns), under Commodore George Collier eventually sighted Constitution in heavy weather off Porto Praya on 11 March 1815. She was proceeding with her two prizes. Due to the weather and some confusion, Constitution eluded the British.

Fire from HMS Leander led Levant's crew to run her ashore, where HMS Acasta then recaptured her. Collier eventually left Acasta and HMS Newcastle windward of Barbados while he searched for Constitution. However, she had returned to port, thus avoiding an engagement. (Note: A first-class share of the prize money for Levant was worth £496 15ss 4d; a sixth-class share, that of an ordinary seaman, was worth £3 5s 4¼d, or about two months' pay.)

Captain Sir George Collier in Leander caught sight of them off Porto Praya on 11 March and succeeded in recapturing Levant. Cyane successfully escaped recapture; she arrived in the North River on 10 April and anchored near USS Constellation.

Because Portugal was unable to maintain its neutrality on its (former) soil the Portuguese government compensated the United States for the loss of Levant.

The Levant was mentioned as having conveyed fugitive slaves to be resettled on Trinidad. (Note: Within Enclosure 8 to Erving. Memorandum of a gentleman of respectability at Bermuda, dated 21 May 1815 "a few that were shipped to the island of Trinidad, in His Majesty's Ship, The Levant; and such as have enlisted in the Colonial Marines.") They were disembarked on 27 May 1815. (Note: 'The initial Merikins arrived in Trinidad on May 27, 1815 (88 on the HMS Levant) and July 5, 1815 (and 58 on the HMS Carron)... November 27, 1815 [saw the] arrival of [the third group, via HMS Carron again, of] 65 ... The fourth and largest group of settlers arrived on August 20, 1816 with 411 men.')

A court martial was held on board the Akbar at Halifax, Nova Scotia, on 28 June 1815. The officers and men of the Cyane and Levant were acquitted for the surrender of their ships, and were praised for their gallant defence.

The Levant arrived in Plymouth on 23 August 1815.

Captain John Sheridan commanded Levant from June 1815 until she was laid up in Chatham in November that year.

== Fate ==
Levant was intended to be repaired and returned to service in August 1820, but this was not carried out and she was broken up by 9 October 1820. Her captured ensign was on display at Mahan Hall at the U.S. Naval Academy, but was removed on 27 February 2018 for preservation.
