= Sir George Collier, 1st Baronet =

British naval officer (1772–1824)

Captain Sir George Collier Bt KCB
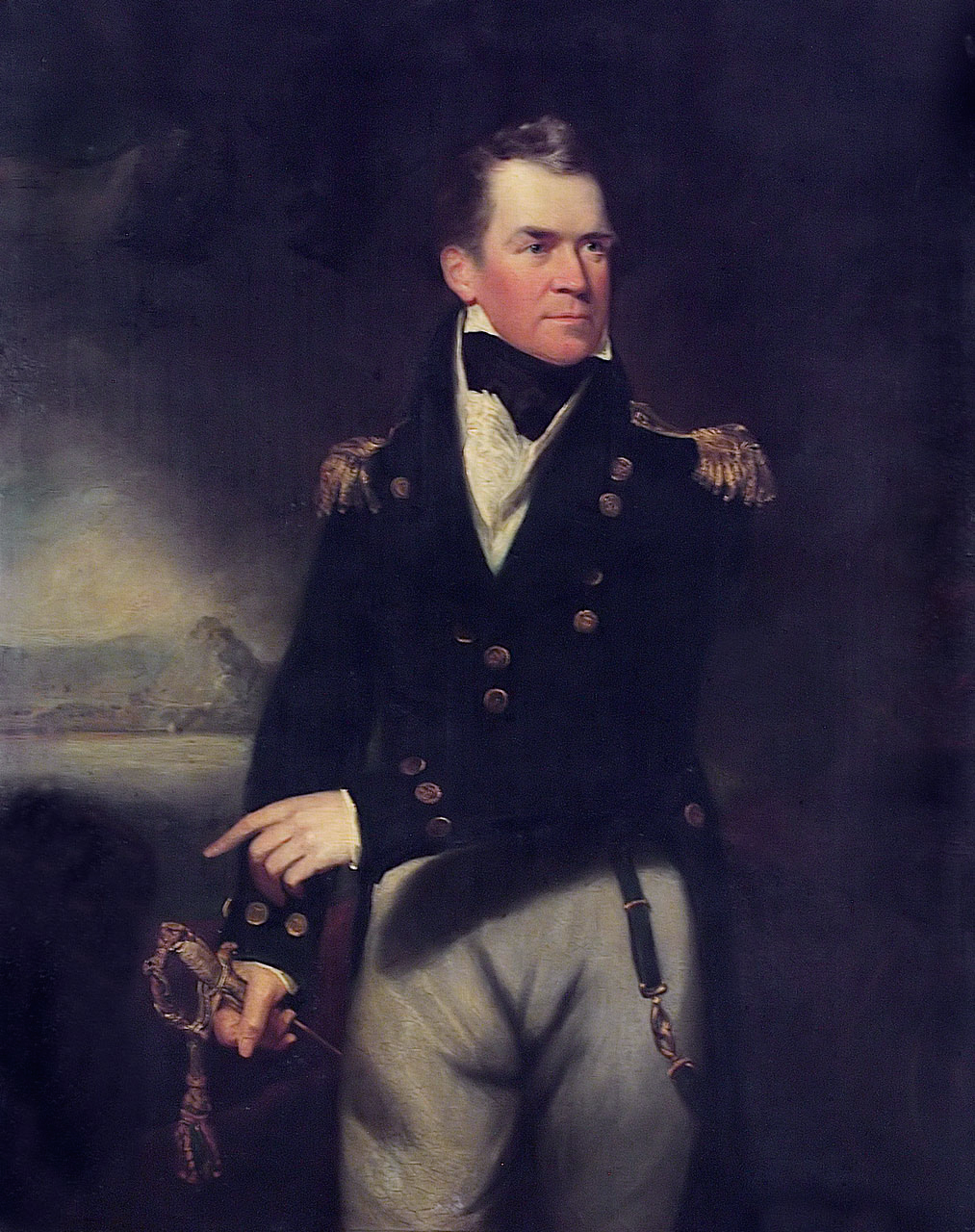
- Born: George Ralph Collier; 1772; London, England
- Died: 24 March 1824 (aged 51); London, England
- Military career
- Allegiance: United Kingdom of Great Britain and Ireland
- Branch: Royal Navy
- Service years: 1787–1824
- Rank: Captain
- Commands: HMS Victor; HMS Leopard; HMS Minerva; HMS Surveillante; HMS Leander; HMS Creole
- Conflicts: French Revolutionary Wars; Napoleonic Wars; War of 1812
- Awards: Knight Commander of the Order of the Bath

Sir George Ralph Collier, 1st Baronet, KCB (bapt. 4 June 1772 – 24 March 1824) was an officer of the Royal Navy during the French Revolutionary and Napoleonic Wars, and the War of 1812. He had an eventful early life, being shipwrecked early in his career and later captured by the French. Nevertheless, he saw enough service to attract the attention of powerful patrons that secured his rise through the ranks. An officer of considerable ability, he won a noteworthy victory against a stronger French opponent, before embarking on a period of distinguished service off the Spanish and Portuguese coasts, working closely with the British generals fighting the Peninsular War, and markedly contributing to their success. His good service led to a prime posting in command of a squadron despatched to hunt down and neutralise the American super frigates during the War of 1812. He came close to capturing the USS Constitution, but lost her in circumstances that were unclear and would later return to haunt him. The years of peace that followed the end of the Napoleonic Wars saw him rewarded with a baronetcy, and he continued to serve in the navy where he was tasked with the suppression of the slave trade. The publishing of William James's account of the War of 1812, which lambasted him for incompetence and cowardice in his failure to catch the Constitution, broke his personal peace. Having failed to clear his name, and increasingly depressed by the accusations, Collier killed himself.

== Family and early life ==
Collier was born in London in 1774, the second son of the chief clerk of the Victualling Board Ralph Collier, and his wife Henrietta Maria. He began his education at the Chelsea Maritime Academy, but by January 1784 his name appeared in the books of the 74-gun third rate HMS Triumph as a captain's servant to the Triumph's commander, Captain Robert Faulknor. This was likely to have been only a nominal entry to gain seniority, and Collier's naval service probably actually began three years later in January 1787, when he joined the 28-gun frigate HMS Carysfort at the rank of midshipman. He moved in June 1790 to take up a position aboard Captain Edward Pellew's 50-gun HMS Salisbury and spent the rest of that year serving on the Newfoundland station. Collier transferred again in December 1790, joining the 100-gun first rate HMS Victory, then under Captain John Knight in the English Channel.

Collier's next ship was Captain Samuel Hood's 32-gun HMS Juno, which he joined in March 1791. He remained with the Juno until she was paid off. On being discharged he took passage aboard the East Indiaman Winchelsea, bound for the East India station. The Winchelsea ran onto a reef in the Mozambique Channel on 3 September 1792 and was wrecked. Collier and the other survivors were able to reach Madagascar, where they remained until being picked up by a Portuguese brig in May the following year. Before they could reach friendly soil the Portuguese ship was captured by a French privateer and Collier and his fellow survivors were sent to Île de France as prisoners. He remained in captivity there until being released in late 1794, whereupon he sailed to the British-held port of Madras.

== French Revolutionary Wars ==
By now the French Revolutionary Wars had broken out, and after a period spent recuperating from his several ordeals, Collier joined Commodore Peter Rainier's flagship HMS Suffolk in June 1795. Collier had passed his lieutenant's examination in 1790, but only now did he receive his commission, when he was appointed lieutenant and commander of the Suffolk Tender on 31 July 1795. Rainer sent him to the Cape of Good Hope, but shortly after his arrival, the commander of the station, Admiral Thomas Pringle ordered that Suffolk Tender be surveyed. She was subsequently condemned as unseaworthy, and Collier returned to Rainer at Madras without a ship. Rainer recommended that he return to Britain, where the good report of his service would assure him further employment and promotion. Collier duly arrived in England in May 1799, and on 2 July that year received an appointment to the 64-gun HMS Zealand, which was then under the command of Captain Thomas Parr. A further advance came shortly afterwards, when he made first lieutenant on 29 July aboard Vice-Admiral Andrew Mitchell's flagship, the 50-gun HMS Isis. He was present at the capture of the Dutch squadron in the Vlieter Incident in August, and was chosen by Mitchell to carry the despatches back to Britain.

=== Battle with the Flèche ===
As was customary Collier received a promotion, to master and commander on 3 September 1799, and a command, the 18-gun sloop HMS Victor, on 21 October. Collier commanded the Victor for the next couple of years, escorting convoys and on one occasion a convoy of troop transports to the Red Sea, bringing troops to defeat the French forces in Egypt. He stopped briefly at Diego Garcia to take on supplies, whereupon he fell in with the 22-gun French corvette Flèche. The two ships fought a brief engagement on 1 September 1801, during which the Flèche damaged the Victor's rigging and managed to escape. After repairing the damage, Collier searched the surrounding area before coming across his opponent on 5 September, sheltering in Mahé Roads. The channel was very narrow, and the wind unfavourable, but Collier managed to warp the Victor into the harbour, and with the aid of her staysails, closed on the French ship. After enduring raking fire for some time, he was finally able to haul his ship around and the two vessels exchanged broadsides for over two hours. By then the Flèche was observed to be in a sinking condition, and her captain ran her aground. A party of men were sent over from the Victor, but having boarded the French vessel, found her crew had set her on fire and then abandoned ship. The men were temporarily evacuated while further assistance was sent across, after which they re-boarded and managed to extinguish the fire. Just as this had been achieved, the Flèche slipped off the reef into deeper water and sank.

Collier therefore came away without his prize, but his exploit came to the attention of the First Lord of the Admiralty Earl St Vincent. Impressed by Collier's daring, St Vincent promoted him to post-captain, with the 50-gun HMS Leopard as his command. As a further mark of favour, St Vincent antedated his commission to 22 April 1802, giving him greater seniority over the officers promoted a week later in the general promotion that followed the Peace of Amiens. With the paying off of the Leopard in 1803 Collier moved ashore, spending until 20 January 1806 in command of the Sea Fencibles at Liverpool. On 18 May 1805 he married Maria Lyon, a resident of the city. The couple did not have any children. It was during this period ashore that Collier devised and presented the plans for a blockade of the Texel, in the hopes of being appointed to lead the expedition. Nothing had come of the scheme by the time he received his next sea-going command, that of the 32-gun HMS Minerva in February 1806.

== Napoleonic Wars ==
The Minerva was sent south to the Spanish and Portuguese coasts, where Collier found himself busy suppressing privateering, and the Spanish coastal forts. He was moved on 22 April 1807 to take up command of the 38-gun HMS Surveillante, and duly took part in the expedition to Copenhagen. He received approbation for his services, and the British commander, Admiral James Gambier sent him back to Britain with his despatches. Collier received a knighthood on 19 September 1807, and by 1812 was back in the Bay of Biscay. He was active off the coast of Spain that year, supporting the guerrillas in the countryside under Admiral Sir Home Popham, and was personally involved in some of the land-based operations of the Peninsular War. He was wounded on 1 August 1812 in an attack on the castle at Santander, but though the attack failed, it led to the French withdrawing from the castle, considering it too exposed. Collier's raids were particularly useful in forcing the French forces in the north of the county to attempt to fortify and defend hundreds of small coastal creeks and villages, instead of supporting the forces in the south, allowing Wellington to defeat them.

It was while operating off the Iberian Peninsula that Collier devised a need for an improved type of ships' boat. He developed a design based on elements of both a whaleboat and a jolly boat, and had one built for him at Plymouth Dockyard. The boat proved extremely useful after tests aboard the Surveillante, especially at being able to land safely on a flat beach to give close support. Collier further modified it by installing a howitzer in the bows, and soon boats of its type were being requested by other captains for their ships. In 1813 Collier succeeded Sir Home Popham in commanding the north coast squadron, Spain. He and a small squadron supported General Arthur Wellesley and General Sir Thomas Graham in the capture of San Sebastián and the siege of Bayonne.

== War of 1812 ==
On 15 March 1814 Collier received command of the 50-gun HMS Leander and was sent to North America to deal with the American super frigates that were causing losses to British merchant shipping. It was a highly sought after posting, and reflected the Admiralty's approval of his efforts off Spain. Collier sought battle with the USS Constitution, but the American ship escaped from Boston and evaded him. He gathered a squadron consisting of the Leander, the 60-gun HMS Newcastle and the 40-gun HMS Acasta, and set off in pursuit. He almost caught up with the Constitution off St Jago, but weather prevented Leander from closing on her. The Constitution was at the time sailing with two captured British prizes, the former HMS Levant and HMS Cyane. Collier's three ships gave chase and were overhauling the Constitution, when, having allowed the Cyane to escape, the Levant broke away and Collier followed her. In doing so he retook the Levant, but allowed Constitution to escape. Collier continued to cruise in the area, but before he had another opportunity to pursue the Constitution, news reached him that the Treaty of Ghent had been signed and that the war was over.

== Years of peace ==
Collier returned to Britain, and on 20 September 1814 he was created a baronet. He was invested as a Knight Commander of the Order of the Bath on 2 January 1815. He was also appointed groom of the bedchamber to the Duke of Gloucester that day.

== West Africa Squadron ==
In 1818, he continued to see active service at sea, being appointed the first Commodore of the West Africa Squadron, with the 36-gun HMS Creole as his flagship. On 19 September 1818, the navy sent him to the Gulf of Guinea with the orders: "You are to use every means in your power to prevent a continuance of the traffic in slaves." Unfortunately, however, the squadron initially had only six ships with which to patrol over 5,000 kilometres (3,000 mi) of coast. Collier served in this post from 1818 to 1821. His distinguished role in anti-slavery efforts led to his election as an honorary life member of the African Institution on 17 May 1820.

== James's account and death ==
Collier's life was disturbed by the publication of William James's Naval History in 1823. James paid particular attention to the escape of the Constitution, and lamented Collier's failure to bring her to action and capture her. James claimed Collier's incompetence had allowed the Constitution to escape from Boston, while his failure to bring her to action when his squadron later sighted her was attributed to what amounted to cowardice on his part. James summed up the episode with

Most sincerely do we regret...that this last and most triumphant escape of the Constitution, the first frigate of the United States that had humbled the proud flag of Britain, had, not long ago, been brought under the scrutiny of a court-martial. The blame would then have fallen where it ought to have fallen...The more it is investigated, the more it will show itself to be, the most blundering piece of business recorded in these six volumes.

Collier applied to the Admiralty for the opportunity to clear his name, but this was not satisfied. Friends and relations had become increasingly concerned about his mental state as a result. His brother took the precaution of removing the razors from his home, but Collier appears to have smuggled one to his room, and used it to cut his own throat early in the morning on 24 March 1824. His servant who was sleeping in the same room immediately brought help, but nothing could be done and Collier died less than five minutes after inflicting the injury, aged 51. The inquest later determined that 'The deceased destroyed himself, being in a state of temporary mental derangement.' The baronetcy became extinct upon his death.

== Notes ==
Baronetage of the United Kingdom
New creation	Baronet (of the Navy); 1814–1824	Extinct
Preceded by Dunbar baronets	Collier baronets of the Navy; 20 September 1814	Succeeded by Hoste baronets
