= HMS Leander (1813) =

Frigate of the Royal Navy

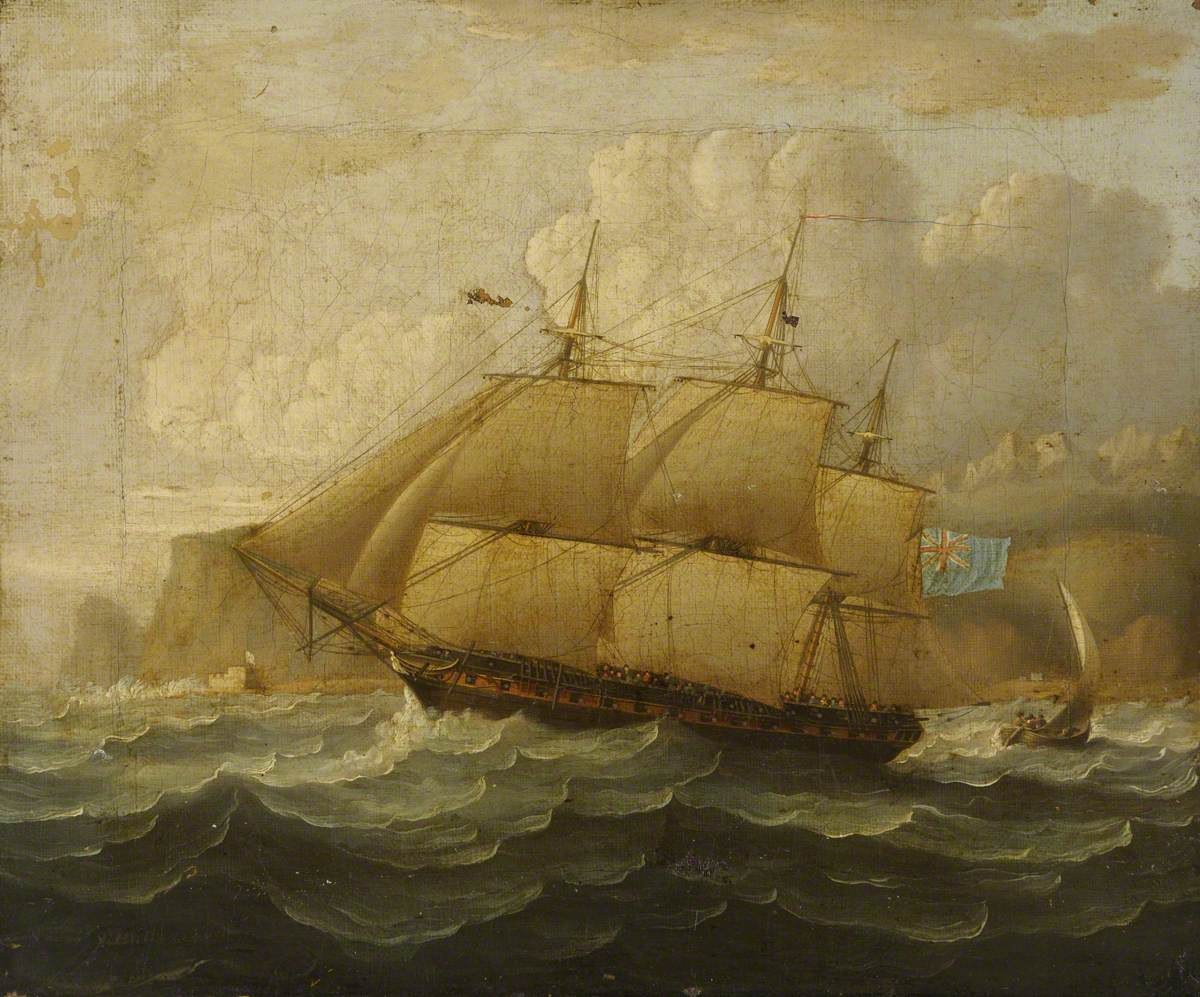
- HMS Leander at Sea, Thomas Buttersworth

History

United Kingdom
- Name: HMS Leander
- Ordered: 6 May 1813
- Builder: Wigram, Wells & Green, Blackwall
- Laid down: June 1813
- Launched: 10 November 1813
- Completed: By 18 February 1814
- Fate: Broken up in March 1830

General characteristics
- Class & type: 50-gun fourth rate
- Tons burthen: 1,57210/94 bm
- Length: 174 ft (53 m) (gundeck); 145 ft 1 3/4 in (44.240 m) (keel)
- Beam: 45 ft 1 1/2 in (13.754 m)
- Depth of hold: 14 ft 4 in (4.37 m)
- Sail plan: Full-rigged ship
- Crew: 450
- Armament: Upper deck: 30 × 24-pounder guns; Spar deck: 26 × 42-pounder carronades; Fc: 4 × 24-pounder guns

HMS Leander was a 50-gun spar-decked frigate (rated in the fourth rate) of the Royal Navy which saw service in the Napoleonic Wars, the War of 1812, and the Second Barbary War.

Leander and her near sister HMS Newcastle were a new type of ship in the Royal Navy, being exceptionally large and powerful frigates. They were ordered in response to the threat posed by the heavy American spar-decked frigates, during the War of 1812. Leander proved a successful ship, which operated in squadrons which chased the American frigates, but ultimately failed to catch them before the war ended. Refitted to serve as flagships for admirals on foreign stations, Leander saw action with Admiral Edward Pellew's fleet at the bombardment of Algiers in 1816, firing over 3,000 round shot and sustaining severe casualties. She spent some time as the flagship on the North American Station, followed by in the East Indies, before returning to Britain in 1822 and being laid up the following year as a receiving ship. She spent the rest of her career in this role, until being broken up in 1830.

== Construction and commissioning ==
HMS Leander was ordered from the Blackwall-based firm of Wigram, Wells & Green on 6 May 1813. She was laid down in June 1813 and built of pitch pine to a design by William Rule. Built of softwood to get her into service as quickly as possible, Leander was launched on 10 November 1813, less than five months after laying down. She was moved to Woolwich Dockyard and completed there by 18 February 1814. The construction of fourth rates, a type that had fallen out of favour prior to the French Revolutionary Wars, was a response to the American spar-decked frigates, like USS Constitution. A spar-decked frigate was one with a continuous row of cannon on the uppermost deck, conventional frigates had an open waist amidships where no guns were mounted. Ordered alongside Leander was the similar 50-gun HMS Newcastle. (Note: Though similar in concept, Newcastle and Leander were not sister ships. Newcastle's designer was the émigré shipwright Jean-Louis Barrallier.)

Leander was a spar-deck frigate, designed to carry thirty 24-pounder guns on her main deck, and twenty-six 42-pounder carronades on her spar deck, with four 24-pounders on her forecastle. This nominal armament was slightly altered during her 1813–18 commission, when two extra 24-pounders replaced two of the carronades on the spar deck. Unusually, the ship was designed with her upper gun ports directly above the lower, instead of offset. She was reported to be fast, exceeding 13 knots, but had a reputation for heavy and violent movements, probably due to poor stowage; this was fixed in her 1820 commission. In 1815, after the War of 1812 and Napoleonic Wars, Newcastle and Leander were fitted with accommodation for a flag officer with a poop deck built over the quarterdeck, and were mostly used as flagships on foreign stations, replacing older 50-gun ships that had previously filled this role. Both ships were re-rated as 60-gun fourth rates in February 1817.

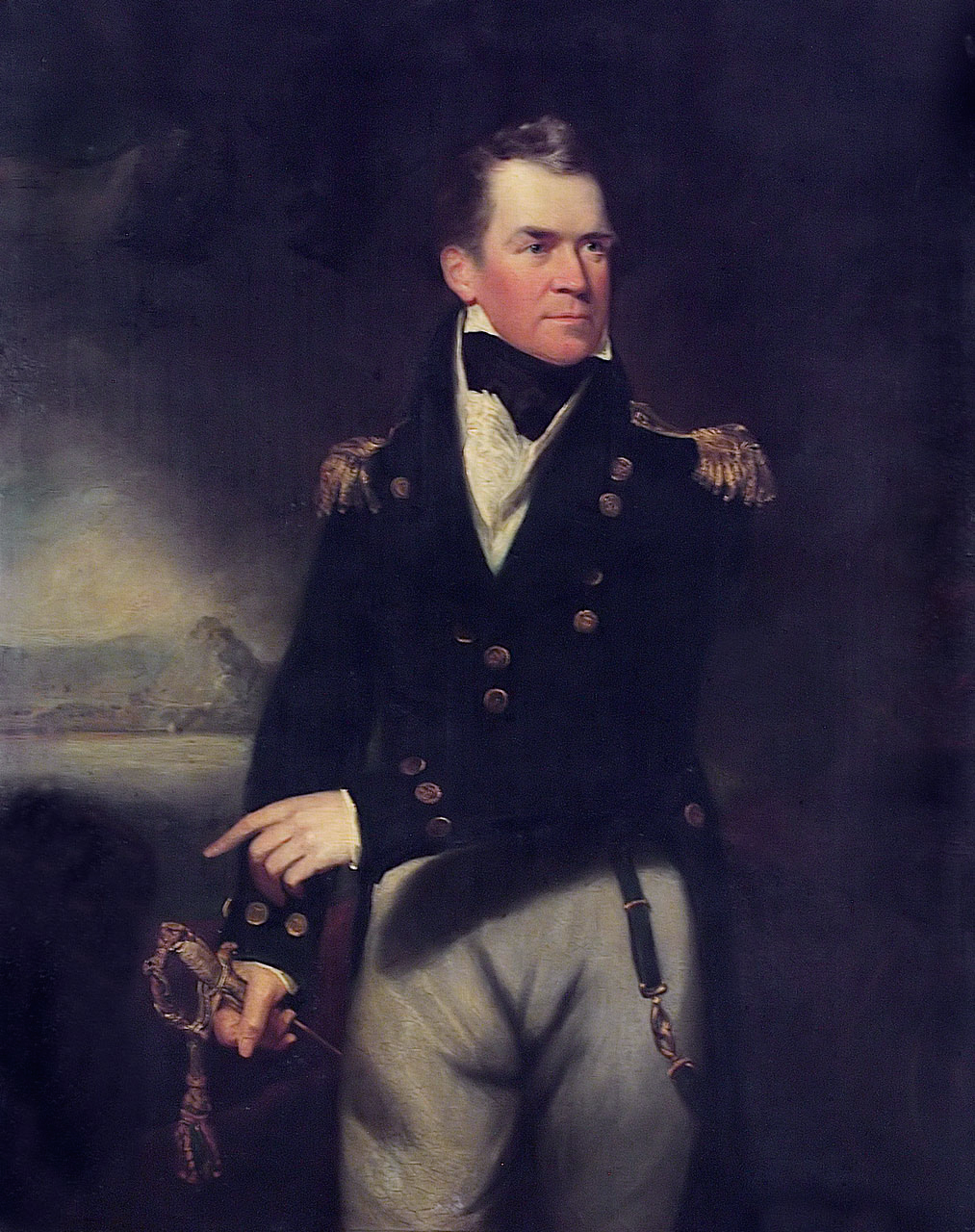
George Collier, Leander's first commander, by William Beechey. A star frigate captain with distinguished service off the Spanish coast to his credit, Collier's failure to catch a fleeing American frigate was criticized.

Leander was commissioned under her first commander, Captain George Collier, in December 1813. Collier had commissioned Newcastle the previous month, but then moved to Leander.

== Service off America ==
Leander went out to North America under Collier's command, and formed part of a powerful squadron assigned to deal with the American super-frigates. Collier had previously served with distinction off the Spanish coast during the Peninsular War, and the highly sought-after posting reflected the Admiralty's approval of these efforts. He captured the USS Rattlesnake on 22 June 1814. Collier sought battle with the USS Constitution, but the American ship escaped from Boston and evaded him. He gathered a squadron consisting of the Leander, Newcastle and the 40-gun HMS Acasta, and set off in pursuit. He almost caught up with the Constitution off St Jago, but was unable to close on her due to the weather. The Constitution was at the time sailing with two captured British prizes, the former HMS Levant and HMS Cyane. Collier's three ships gave chase and were overhauling the Constitution, when, having allowed the Cyane to escape, the Levant broke away and Collier followed her. In doing so he retook the Levant, but allowed Constitution to escape. Collier continued to cruise in the area, but before he had another opportunity to pursue the Constitution, news reached him that the Treaty of Ghent had been signed and that the war was over. (Note: The naval historian William James heavily criticized Collier's failure to capture Constitution in James's 1823 Naval History. Collier tried to clear his name by asking for a court-martial. When the Admiralty denied the request, Collier killed himself on 24 March 1824.)

Leander recaptured the British merchant vessel John on 4 January 1815, just before the end of the war. (Note: A first-class share of the salvage money was worth £9 9s 17d; a sixth-class share, that of an ordinary seaman, was worth 4s 4 3/4d.)

== Later service ==
The bombardment of Algiers, on the far left is HMS Leander, stationed ahead of the flagship HMS Queen Charlotte, painting by Thomas Luny

Leander's next commander, from August 1815, was Captain William Skipsey. She underwent a repair and refit at Woolwich between August 1815 and February 1816, after which she went out to the Mediterranean under Captain Edward Chetham. She was active in the Second Barbary War, as part of the British fleet under Admiral Edward Pellew. She took part in the bombardment of Algiers on 27 August 1816, firing 3,680 round shot and sustaining casualties of 17 men killed and 118 wounded.

Leander then became the flagship of the commander of the North American Station, Rear-Admiral Sir David Milne in 1817, and was based at Halifax. She was repaired at Portsmouth between July and November 1819, and recommissioned that year under Captain Charles Richardson. Richardson took her out to the East Indies as the flagship of Rear-Admiral Sir Henry Blackwood. Leander came briefly under the temporary command of Captain Price Blackwood between February and May 1822, and returned to England later that year. HMS Leander spent her final years as a receiving ship at Portsmouth between 1823 and 1830, and was broken up there in March 1830.
